= 2022 Indiana House of Representatives election =

- November 8, 2022

All 100 seats in the Indiana House of Representatives 51 seats needed for a majority
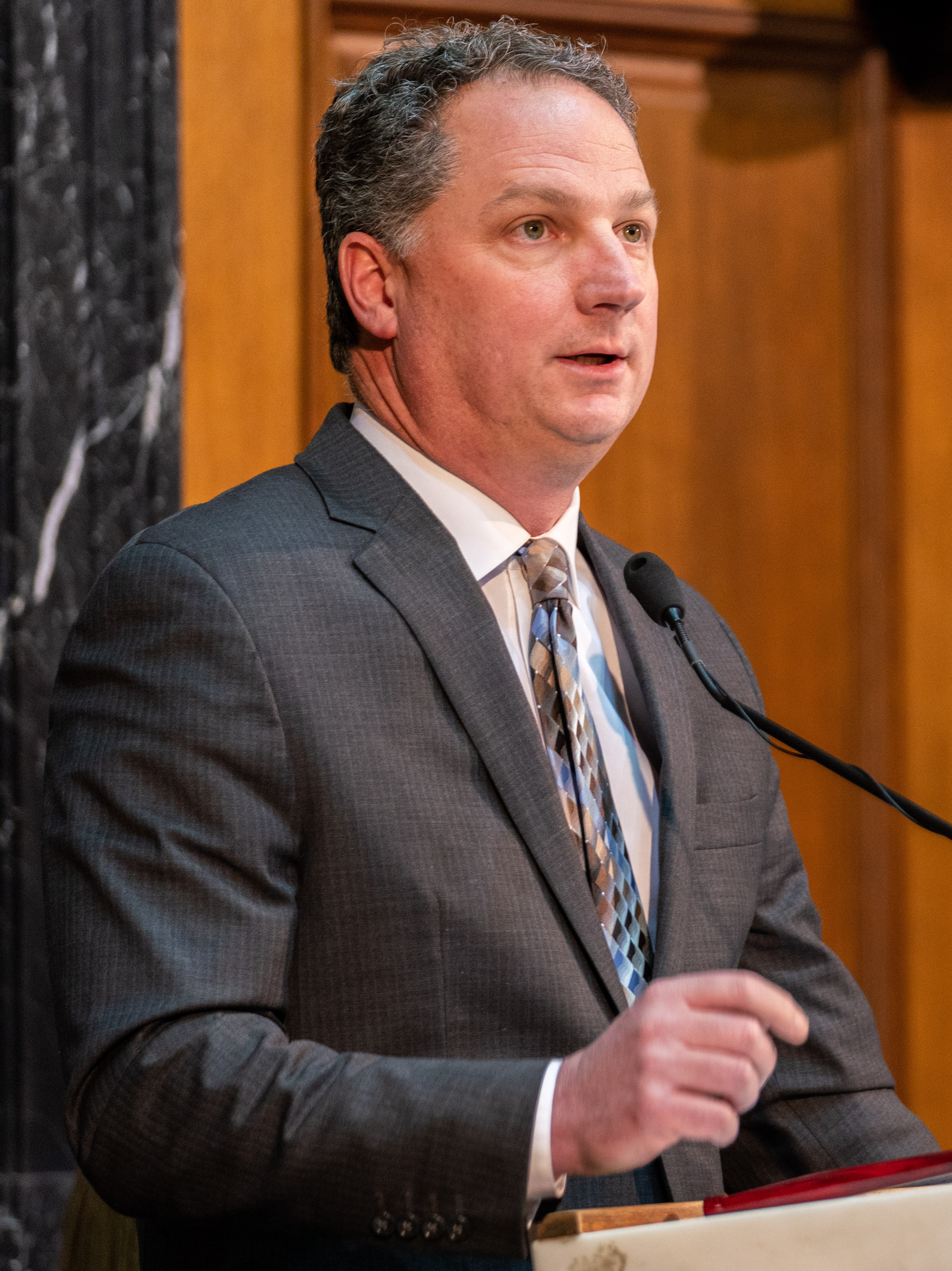

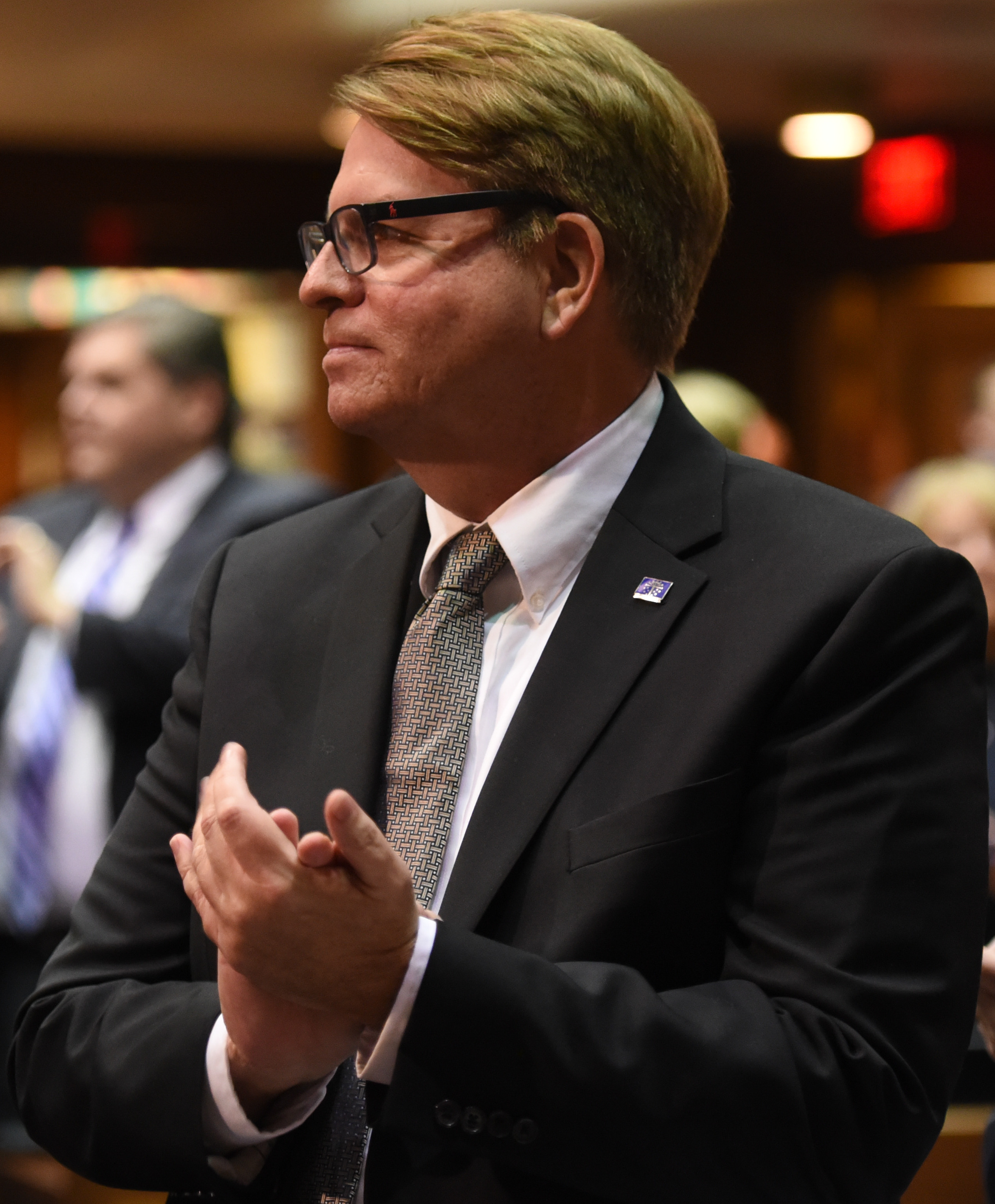
	Majority party	Minority party
Leader	Todd Huston	Phil GiaQuinta
Party	Republican	Democratic
Leader's seat	37th-Fishers	80th-Fort Wayne
Last election	71	29
Seats won	70	30
Seat change	▼1	▲1
Popular vote	1,108,854	554,181
Percentage	66.04%	33.01%
Swing	▲6.35%	▼6.76%
- Republican gain Democratic gain Republican hold Democratic hold 50–60% 60–70% 70–80% 80–90% >90% 50–60% 60–70% 70–80% 80–90% >90%
Speaker before election
Todd Huston
Republican
Elected Speaker
Todd Huston
Republican

The 2022 elections for the Indiana House of Representatives took place on Tuesday November 8, 2022, to elect representatives from all 100 districts in the Indiana House of Representatives. The primary election took place on Tuesday May 3, 2022. The Republican Party had held a House majority since 2011.

The elections for Indiana United States Senator, Indiana's nine congressional districts, and the Indiana Senate were also held on this date.

Democrats gained one seat (Carmel and Fort Wayne), decreasing the Republican supermajority to 70 out of 100 seats.

== Overview ==
2022 Indiana State House general election
Party	Votes	Percentage	% change	Seats before	Candidates	Seats after	+/–
Republican	1,108,621	66.04%	▲6.35%	71	86	70	▼1
Democratic	554,181	33.01%	▼6.76%	29	67	30	▲1
Independent	9,497	0.57%	▲0.42%	0	6	0	Steady
Libertarian	6,520	0.39%	Steady	0	4	0	Steady
Totals	1,678,819	100.00%	—	100	163	100	—

== Background ==
In the 2020 United States Presidential election, Republican Donald Trump won the most votes in 70 Indiana House of Representatives Districts and Democrat Joe Biden won the most votes in 30 districts. Heading into the 2022 Indiana House of Representatives election, Democrats hold two districts where Trump won in 2020: District 36, located in Anderson (Trump +2%) and District 43, located in Terre Haute (Trump +3%) while Republicans hold three districts where Biden won in 2020: District 32, located in Fishers (Biden +2%), District 62, which includes parts of Monroe, Brown, and Jackson counties (Biden +0.3%), and District 82, located in Fort Wayne (Biden +5%).

Biden 40–50% 50–60% 60–70% 70–80% 80–90% 90–100% / Trump 40–50% 50–60% 60–70% 70–80% 80–90% 90–100%

== Predictions ==
Source	Ranking	As of
Sabato's Crystal Ball	Safe R	May 19, 2022

== Incumbents defeated in primaries ==
=== Republicans ===
1. District 22: Curt Nisly lost renomination to fellow incumbent Craig Snow in a redistricting race.
2. District 45: Jeff Ellington lost renomination to fellow incumbent Bruce Borders in a redistricting race.
3. District 47: John Young lost renomination to Robb Greene.
4. District 50: Dan Leonard lost renomination to Lorissa Sweet.
5. District 93: John Jacob lost renomination to Julie McGuire.

== Districts 1–25 ==
=== District 1 ===
The district had been represented by Democrat Carolyn Jackson since 2018. Jackson was re-elected unopposed in 2020.

==== Democratic primary ====
===== Candidates =====
====== Declared ======
- Carolyn Jackson, incumbent state representative

===== Results =====
Democratic primary
Party	Candidate	Votes	%
Democratic	Carolyn Jackson (incumbent)	Unopposed	100
Total votes			100.0

==== General election ====
===== Results =====
General election
Party	Candidate	Votes	%	±%
Democratic	Carolyn Jackson (incumbent)	Unopposed	100	
Total votes		8,833	100.0	
Democratic hold				

=== District 2 ===
The district had been represented by Democrat Earl Harris Jr. since 2016. Harris Jr. was re-elected unopposed in 2020.

==== Democratic primary ====
===== Candidates =====
====== Declared ======
- Earl Harris Jr., incumbent state representative

===== Results =====
Democratic primary
Party	Candidate	Votes	%
Democratic	Earl Harris Jr. (incumbent)	Unopposed	100
Total votes			100.0

==== General election ====
===== Results =====
General election
Party	Candidate	Votes	%	±%
Democratic	Earl Harris Jr. (incumbent)	Unopposed	100	
Total votes		10,116	100.0	
Democratic hold				

=== District 3 ===
The district had been represented by Democrat Ragen Hatcher since 2018. Hatcher was re-elected unopposed in 2020.

==== Democratic primary ====
===== Candidates =====
====== Declared ======
- Ragen Hatcher, incumbent state representative

===== Results =====
Democratic primary
Party	Candidate	Votes	%
Democratic	Ragen Hatcher (incumbent)	Unopposed	100
Total votes			100.0

==== General election ====
===== Results =====
General election
Party	Candidate	Votes	%	±%
Democratic	Ragen Hatcher (incumbent)	Unopposed	100	
Total votes		10,551	100.0	
Democratic hold				

=== District 4 ===
The district had been represented by Republican Edmond Soliday since 2006. Soliday was re-elected with 54.6% of the vote in 2020.

==== Republican primary ====
===== Candidates =====
====== Declared ======
- Edmond Soliday, incumbent state representative

===== Results =====
Republican primary
Party	Candidate	Votes	%
Republican	Edmond Soliday (incumbent)	Unopposed	100
Total votes			100.0

==== General election ====
===== Results =====
General election
Party	Candidate	Votes	%	±%
Republican	Edmond Soliday (incumbent)	Unopposed	100	
Total votes		19,293	100.0	
Republican hold				

=== District 5 ===
The district had been represented by Republican Dale DeVon since 2012. DeVon was re-elected with 50.7% of the vote in 2020.

==== Republican primary ====
===== Candidates =====
====== Declared ======
- Dale DeVon, incumbent state representative

===== Results =====
Republican primary
Party	Candidate	Votes	%
Republican	Dale DeVon (incumbent)	Unopposed	100
Total votes			100.0

==== General election ====
===== Results =====
General election
Party	Candidate	Votes	%	±%
Republican	Dale DeVon (incumbent)	11,738	56.7	
Democratic	Heidi Beidinger	8,966	43.3	
Total votes		20,704	100.0	
Republican hold				

=== District 6 ===
The district had been represented by Democrat Maureen Bauer since 2020. Bauer was first elected unopposed in 2020.

==== Democratic primary ====
===== Candidates =====
====== Declared ======
- Maureen Bauer, incumbent state representative

===== Results =====
Democratic primary
Party	Candidate	Votes	%
Democratic	Maureen Bauer (incumbent)	Unopposed	100
Total votes			100.0

==== General election ====
===== Results =====
General election
Party	Candidate	Votes	%	±%
Democratic	Maureen Bauer (incumbent)	Unopposed	100	
Total votes		9,165	100.0	
Democratic hold				

=== District 7 ===
The district had been represented by Republican Jake Teshka since 2020. Teshka was first elected with 54.0% of the vote in 2020.

==== Republican primary ====
===== Candidates =====
====== Declared ======
- Timothy Jaycox, nominee for Indiana's 8th Senate district in 2020
- Jake Teshka, incumbent state representative
- Sarina Williams

===== Results =====
Republican primary
Party	Candidate	Votes	%
Republican	Jake Teshka (incumbent)	2,138	69.2
Republican	Sarina Williams	792	25.6
Republican	Timothy Jaycox	161	5.2
Total votes		3,091	100.0

==== Democratic primary ====
===== Candidates =====
====== Declared ======
- Ross Deal, former state representative for this seat

===== Results =====
Democratic primary
Party	Candidate	Votes	%
Democratic	Ross Deal	Unopposed	100
Total votes			100.0

==== General election ====
===== Results =====
General election
Party	Candidate	Votes	%	±%
Republican	Jake Teshka (incumbent)	11,969	60.8	
Democratic	Ross Deal	7,702	39.2	
Total votes		19,671	100.0	
Republican hold				

=== District 8 ===
The district had been represented by Democrat Ryan Dvorak since 2002. Dvorak was re-elected with 56.8% of the vote in 2020.

==== Democratic primary ====
===== Candidates =====
====== Declared ======
- Ryan Dvorak, incumbent state representative

===== Results =====
Democratic primary
Party	Candidate	Votes	%
Democratic	Ryan Dvorak (incumbent)	Unopposed	100
Total votes			100.0

==== General election ====
===== Results =====
General election
Party	Candidate	Votes	%	±%
Democratic	Ryan Dvorak (incumbent)	Unopposed	100.0	
Total votes		11,325	100.0	
Democratic hold				

=== District 9 ===
The district had been represented by Democrat Patricia Boy since 2018. Boy was elected with 56.6% of the vote in 2020.

==== Republican primary ====
===== Candidates =====
====== Declared ======
- Dion Bergeron, real estate broker, nominee for this district in 2020, and candidate for Indiana's 1st congressional district in 2020

===== Results =====
Republican primary
Party	Candidate	Votes	%
Republican	Dion Bergeron	Unopposed	100
Total votes			100.0

==== Democratic primary ====
===== Candidates =====
====== Declared ======
- Patricia Boy, incumbent state representative

===== Results =====
Democratic primary
Party	Candidate	Votes	%
Democratic	Patricia Boy (incumbent)	Unopposed	100
Total votes			100.0

==== General election ====
===== Results =====
General election
Party	Candidate	Votes	%	±%
Democratic	Patricia Boy (incumbent)	11,645	54.9	
Republican	Dion Bergeron	9,576	45.1	
Total votes		21,221	100.0	
Democratic hold				

=== District 10 ===
The district had been represented by Democrat Charles Moseley since 2008. Moseley was re-elected unopposed in 2020.

==== Republican primary ====
===== Candidates =====
====== Declared ======
- Manuel Maldonaldo

===== Results =====
Republican primary
Party	Candidate	Votes	%
Republican	Manuel Maldonaldo	Unopposed	100
Total votes			100.0

==== Democratic primary ====
===== Candidates =====
====== Declared ======
- Charles Moseley, incumbent state representative

===== Results =====
Democratic primary
Party	Candidate	Votes	%
Democratic	Charles Moseley (incumbent)	Unopposed	100
Total votes			100.0

==== General election ====
===== Results =====
General election
Party	Candidate	Votes	%	±%
Democratic	Charles Moseley (incumbent)	10,043	52.8	
Republican	Manuel Maldonaldo	8,977	47.2	
Total votes		19,020	100.0	
Democratic hold				

=== District 11 ===
The district had been represented by Republican Michael Aylesworth since 2014. Aylesworth was re-elected with 68.8% of the vote in 2020.

==== Republican primary ====
===== Candidates =====
====== Declared ======
- Michael Aylesworth, incumbent state representative
- Andrew Boersma
- Pierce Fischer

===== Results =====
Republican primary
Party	Candidate	Votes	%
Republican	Michael Aylesworth (incumbent)	3,226	58.2
Republican	Andrew Boersma	1,882	34.0
Republican	Pierce Fischer	433	7.8
Total votes		5,541	100.0

==== General election ====
===== Results =====
General election
Party	Candidate	Votes	%	±%
Republican	Michael Aylesworth (incumbent)	Unopposed		
Total votes		16,332	100.0	
Republican hold				

=== District 12 ===
The district had been represented by Democrat Mike Andrade since 2020. Andrade was first elected with 57.7% of the vote in 2020.

==== Democratic primary ====
===== Candidates =====
====== Declared ======
- Mike Andrade, incumbent state representative

===== Results =====
Democratic primary
Party	Candidate	Votes	%
Democratic	Mike Andrade (incumbent)	Unopposed	100
Total votes			100.0

==== General election ====
===== Results =====
General election
Party	Candidate	Votes	%	±%
Democratic	Mike Andrade (incumbent)	12,556	55.6	
Republican	Charles Kallas	10,031	44.4	
Total votes		22,587	100.0	
Democratic hold				

=== District 13 ===
The district had been represented by Republican Sharon Negele since 2012. Negele was re-elected with 72.8% of the vote in 2020.

==== Republican primary ====
===== Candidates =====
====== Declared ======
- Sharon Negele, incumbent state representative

===== Results =====
Republican primary
Party	Candidate	Votes	%
Republican	Sharon Negele (incumbent)	Unopposed	100
Total votes			100.0

==== General election ====
===== Results =====
General election
Party	Candidate	Votes	%	±%
Republican	Sharon Negele (incumbent)	Unopposed	100.0	
Total votes		15,312	100.0	
Republican hold				

=== District 14 ===
The district had been represented by Democrat Vernon Smith since 1990. Smith was re-elected unopposed in 2020.

==== Democratic primary ====
===== Candidates =====
====== Declared ======
- Vernon Smith, incumbent state representative

===== Results =====
Democratic primary
Party	Candidate	Votes	%
Democratic	Vernon Smith (incumbent)	Unopposed	100
Total votes			100.0

==== General election ====
===== Results =====
General election
Party	Candidate	Votes	%	±%
Democratic	Vernon Smith (incumbent)	Unopposed	100.0	
Total votes		11,848	100.0	
Democratic hold				

=== District 15 ===
The district had been represented by Republican Hal Slager since 2020, but previously held office from 2012 to 2018. Slager was elected with 51.5% of the vote in 2020.

==== Republican primary ====
===== Candidates =====
====== Declared ======
- Hal Slager, incumbent state representative

===== Results =====
Republican primary
Party	Candidate	Votes	%
Republican	Hal Slager (incumbent)	Unopposed	100
Total votes			100.0

==== Democratic primary ====
===== Candidates =====
====== Declared ======
- Chris Kukuch, candidate for Indiana's 1st Senate district in 2018

===== Results =====
Democratic primary
Party	Candidate	Votes	%
Democratic	Chris Kukuch	Unopposed	100
Total votes			100.0

==== General election ====
===== Results =====
General election
Party	Candidate	Votes	%	±%
Republican	Hal Slager (incumbent)	16,291	63.2	
Democratic	Chris Kukuch	9,468	36.8	
Total votes		25,759	100.0	
Republican hold				

=== District 16 ===
The district had been represented by Republican Douglas Gutwein since 2008. Gutwein was re-elected with 74.1% of the vote in 2020. Gutewin announced he would not run for re-election and was retiring.

==== Republican primary ====
===== Candidates =====
====== Declared ======
- Kendell Culp, Jasper County commissioner
- Barbara Neihouser
- Bryan Washburn

====== Declined ======
- Douglas Gutwein, incumbent state representative

===== Results =====
Republican primary
Party	Candidate	Votes	%
Republican	Kendell Culp	3,833	47.7
Republican	Barbara Neihouser	2,794	34.8
Republican	Bryan Washburn	1,410	17.5
Total votes		8,037	100.0

==== General election ====
===== Results =====
General election
Party	Candidate	Votes	%	±%
Republican	Kendell Culp	Unopposed	100.0	
Total votes		15,546	100.0	
Republican hold				

=== District 17 ===
The district had been represented by Republican Jack Jordan since 2016. Jordan was re-elected with 74.7% of the vote in 2020.

==== Republican primary ====
===== Candidates =====
====== Declared ======
- Jack Jordan, incumbent state representative

===== Results =====
Republican primary
Party	Candidate	Votes	%
Republican	Jack Jordan (incumbent)	Unopposed	100
Total votes			100.0

==== General election ====
===== Results =====
General election
Party	Candidate	Votes	%	±%
Republican	Jack Jordan (incumbent)	13,863	74.8	
Democratic	Jim White	4,673	25.2	
Total votes		18,536	100.0	
Republican hold				

=== District 18 ===
The district had been represented by Republican Craig Snow since 2020. He was first elected with 78.1% of the vote in 2020. He was now running in the 22nd district due to redistricting.

==== Republican primary ====
===== Candidates =====
====== Declared ======
- David Abbott, incumbent state representative from District 82

====== Declined ======
- Craig Snow, incumbent state representative (running in 22nd district)

===== Results =====
Republican primary
Party	Candidate	Votes	%
Republican	David Abbott (incumbent)	Unopposed	100
Total votes			100.0

==== General election ====
===== Results =====
General election
Party	Candidate	Votes	%	±%
Republican	David Abbott (incumbent)	Unopposed	100.0	
Total votes		17,081	100.0	
Republican hold				

=== District 19 ===
The district had been represented by Republican Julie Olthoff since 2020, but she previously represented it from 2014 to 2018. Olthoff was first elected with 51.8% of the vote in 2020.

==== Republican primary ====
===== Candidates =====
====== Declared ======
- Julie Olthoff, incumbent state representative

===== Results =====
Republican primary
Party	Candidate	Votes	%
Republican	Julie Olthoff (incumbent)	Unopposed	100
Total votes			100.0

==== Democratic primary ====
===== Candidates =====
====== Declared ======
- Lisa Beck, former state representative for 19th district (2018–2020)

===== Results =====
Democratic primary
Party	Candidate	Votes	%
Democratic	Lisa Beck	Unopposed	100
Total votes			100.0

==== General election ====
===== Results =====
General election
Party	Candidate	Votes	%	±%
Republican	Julie Olthoff (incumbent)	13,662	58.7	
Democratic	Lisa Beck	9,605	41.3	
Total votes		23,267	100.0	
Republican hold				

=== District 20 ===
The district had been represented by Republican Jim Pressel since 2016. Pressel was re-elected with 68.2% of the vote in 2020.

==== Republican primary ====
===== Candidates =====
====== Declared ======
- Heather Oake
- Jim Pressel, incumbent state representative

===== Results =====
Republican primary
Party	Candidate	Votes	%
Republican	Jim Pressel (incumbent)	3,495	65.5
Republican	Heather Oake	1,840	34.5
Total votes		5,335	100.0

==== General election ====
===== Results =====
General election
Party	Candidate	Votes	%	±%
Republican	Jim Pressel (incumbent)	Unopposed	100.0	
Total votes		15,197	100.0	
Republican hold				

=== District 21 ===
The district had been represented by Republican Timothy Wesco since 2010. Wesco was re-elected with 64.5% of the vote in 2020.

==== Republican primary ====
===== Candidates =====
====== Declared ======
- Timothy Wesco, incumbent state representative
- Stephen Gray

===== Results =====
Republican primary
Party	Candidate	Votes	%
Republican	Timothy Wesco (incumbent)	2,297	84.0
Republican	Stephen Gray	436	16.0
Total votes		2,733	100.0

==== General election ====
===== Results =====
General election
Party	Candidate	Votes	%	±%
Republican	Timothy Wesco (incumbent)	9,466	73.8	
Democratic	Camden Chaffee	3,367	26.2	
Total votes		12,833	100.0	
Republican hold				

=== District 22 ===
The district had been represented by Republican Curt Nisly since 2014. Nisly was re-elected with 72.1% of the vote in 2020. Due to redistricting, Craig Snow from the 18th district was now included as a representative for this district, triggering a primary.

==== Republican primary ====
===== Candidates =====
====== Declared ======
- Curt Nisly, incumbent state representative
- Craig Snow, incumbent state representative for the 18th district

===== Results =====
Republican primary
Party	Candidate	Votes	%
Republican	Craig Snow	6,634	73.1
Republican	Curt Nisly (incumbent)	2,445	26.9
Total votes		9,079	100.0

==== Democratic primary ====
===== Candidates =====
====== Declared ======
- Dee Moore, nominee for this district in 2016 and 2018

===== Results =====
Democratic primary
Party	Candidate	Votes	%
Democratic	Dee Moore	Unopposed	100
Total votes			100.0

==== Libertarian convention ====
===== Candidates =====
====== Declared ======
- Josh Vergiels

==== General election ====
===== Results =====
General election
Party	Candidate	Votes	%	±%
Republican	Craig Snow	14,745	79.4	
Democratic	Dee Moore	3,053	16.4	
Libertarian	Josh Vergiels	784	4.2	
Total votes		18,582	100.0	
Republican hold				

=== District 23 ===
The district had been represented by Republican Ethan Manning since 2018. Manning was re-elected unopposed in 2020.

==== Republican primary ====
===== Candidates =====
====== Declared ======
- Ethan Manning, incumbent state representative

===== Results =====
Republican primary
Party	Candidate	Votes	%
Republican	Ethan Manning (incumbent)	Unopposed	100
Total votes			100.0

==== General election ====
===== Results =====
General election
Party	Candidate	Votes	%	±%
Republican	Ethan Manning (incumbent)	Unopposed	100.0	
Total votes		12,346	100.0	
Republican hold				

=== District 24 ===
The district had been represented by Republican Donna Schaibley since 2014. Schaibley was re-elected with 58.1% of the vote in 2020.

==== Republican primary ====
===== Candidates =====
====== Declared ======
- Donna Schaibley, incumbent state representative

===== Results =====
Republican primary
Party	Candidate	Votes	%
Republican	Donna Schaibley (incumbent)	Unopposed	100
Total votes			100.0

==== Democratic primary ====
===== Candidates =====
====== Declared ======
- Joellyn Mayer

===== Results =====
Democratic primary
Party	Candidate	Votes	%
Democratic	Joellyn Mayer	Unopposed	100
Total votes			100.0

==== General election ====
===== Results =====
General election
Party	Candidate	Votes	%	±%
Republican	Donna Schaibley (incumbent)	14,674	56.6	
Democratic	Joellyn Mayer	10,571	40.8	
Independent	Ken Tucker	660	2.5	
Total votes		25,905	100.0	
Republican hold				

=== District 25 ===
The district had been represented by Republican Donald Lehe since 2002. Lehe was re-elected with 70.3% of the vote in 2020. Lehe announced he would not run for re-election and would be retiring. The old district was based in rural north central Indiana. After redistricting, District 25 became a suburban district based on the towns of Zionsville and Whitestown in Boone County, as well as part of the Town of Brownsburg in Hendricks County.

==== Republican primary ====
===== Candidates =====
====== Declared ======
- Kent Abernathy, former commissioner of Indiana's Bureau of Motor Vehicles
- Becky Cash, small business owner
- Douglas Rapp
- Matthew Whetstone, lobbyist and former state representative

====== Declined ======
- Donald Lehe, incumbent state representative

===== Results =====
Republican primary
Party	Candidate	Votes	%
Republican	Becky Cash	2,075	39.4
Republican	Kent Abernathy	1,426	27.1
Republican	Matthew Whetstone	1,368	25.9
Republican	Douglas Rapp	399	7.6
Total votes		5,268	100.0

==== Democratic primary ====
===== Candidates =====
====== Declared ======
- Jen Bass-Patino

====== Disqualified/withdrew ======
- Maurice Fuller, nominee for this district in 2014, 2016, and 2018, and candidate for this district in 2020

==== General election ====
===== Results =====
General election
Party	Candidate	Votes	%	±%
Republican	Becky Cash	12,370	52.7	
Democratic	Jen Bass-Patino	11,097	47.3	
Total votes		23,467	100.0	
Republican hold				

== Districts 26–50 ==
=== District 26 ===
The district had been represented by Democrat Chris Campbell since 2018. Campbell was re-elected unopposed in 2020.

==== Democratic primary ====
===== Candidates =====
====== Declared ======
- Chris Campbell, incumbent state representative

===== Results =====
Democratic primary
Party	Candidate	Votes	%
Democratic	Chris Campbell (incumbent)	Unopposed	100
Total votes			100.0

==== General election ====
===== Results =====
General election
Party	Candidate	Votes	%	±%
Democratic	Chris Campbell (incumbent)	7,201	59.9	
Republican	Fred Duttlinger	4,828	40.1	
Total votes		12,029	100.0	
Democratic hold				

=== District 27 ===
The district had been represented by Democrat Sheila Klinker since 1982. Klinker was re-elected with 62.1% of the vote in 2020.

==== Republican primary ====
===== Candidates =====
====== Declared ======
- James Hass, nominee for this district in 2010 and 2020
- Tim Radice, candidate for Indiana's 4th congressional district in 2018

===== Results =====
Republican primary
Party	Candidate	Votes	%
Republican	James Hass	888	62.7
Republican	Tim Radice	528	37.3
Total votes		1,416	100.0

==== Democratic primary ====
===== Candidates =====
====== Declared ======
- Sheila Klinker, incumbent state representative

===== Results =====
Democratic primary
Party	Candidate	Votes	%
Democratic	Sheila Klinker (incumbent)	Unopposed	100
Total votes			100.0

==== General election ====
===== Results =====
General election
Party	Candidate	Votes	%	±%
Democratic	Sheila Klinker (incumbent)	7,453	60.1	
Republican	James Hass	4,948	39.9	
Total votes		12,401	100.0	
Democratic hold				

=== District 28 ===
The district had been represented by Republican Jeff Thompson since 1998. Thompson was re-elected with 71.5% of the vote in 2020.

==== Republican primary ====
===== Candidates =====
====== Declared ======
- Jeff Thompson, incumbent state representative

===== Results =====
Republican primary
Party	Candidate	Votes	%
Republican	Jeff Thompson (incumbent)	Unopposed	100
Total votes			100.0

==== Democratic primary ====
===== Candidates =====
====== Declared ======
- John Futrell, candidate for Indiana's 4th congressional district in 2014
- Eric Shotwell, nominee for this district in 2020

===== Results =====
Democratic primary
Party	Candidate	Votes	%
Democratic	Eric Shotwell	400	67.8
Democratic	John Futrell	190	32.2
Total votes		590	100.0

==== General election ====
===== Results =====
General election
Party	Candidate	Votes	%	±%
Republican	Jeff Thompson (incumbent)	Unopposed	100.0	
Total votes		16,267	100.0	
Republican hold				

=== District 29 ===
The district had been represented by Republican Chuck Goodrich since 2018. Goodrich was re-elected with 66% of the vote in 2020.

==== Republican primary ====
===== Candidates =====
====== Declared ======
- Chuck Goodrich, incumbent state representative

===== Results =====
Republican primary
Party	Candidate	Votes	%
Republican	Chuck Goodrich (incumbent)	Unopposed	100
Total votes			100.0

==== General election ====
===== Results =====
General election
Party	Candidate	Votes	%	±%
Republican	Chuck Goodrich (incumbent)	Unopposed	100.0	
Total votes		17,082	100.0	
Republican hold				

=== District 30 ===
The district had been represented by Republican Michael Karickhoff since 2010. Karickhoff was re-elected with 66.1% of the vote in 2020.

==== Republican primary ====
===== Candidates =====
====== Declared ======
- Michael Karickhoff, incumbent state representative

===== Results =====
Republican primary
Party	Candidate	Votes	%
Republican	Michael Karickhoff (incumbent)	Unopposed	100
Total votes			100.0

==== Democratic primary ====
===== Candidates =====
====== Declared ======
- Robin Williams

===== Results =====
Democratic primary
Party	Candidate	Votes	%
Democratic	Robin Williams	Unopposed	100.0
Total votes			100.0

==== General election ====
===== Results =====
General election
Party	Candidate	Votes	%	±%
Republican	Michael Karickhoff (incumbent)	12,235	67.5	
Democratic	Robin Williams	5,885	32.5	
Total votes		18,120	100.0	
Republican hold				

=== District 31 ===
The district had been represented by Republican Ann Vermilion since her appointment in 2019. Vermilion was re-elected unopposed in 2020.

==== Republican primary ====
===== Candidates =====
====== Declared ======
- Andy Lyons, retired teacher
- Ann Vermilion, incumbent state representative

===== Results =====
Republican primary
Party	Candidate	Votes	%
Republican	Ann Vermilion (incumbent)	4,623	73.9
Republican	Andy Lyons	1,632	26.1
Total votes		6,255	100.0

==== General election ====
===== Results =====
General election
Party	Candidate	Votes	%	±%
Republican	Ann Vermilion (incumbent)	Unopposed		
Total votes		13,165	100.0	
Republican hold				

=== District 32 ===
The district had been represented by Republican Tony Cook since 2014. Cook was re-elected with 75.4% of the vote in 2020. The previous district was a rural district stretching from northern Hamilton County to Grant County, and picked up parts of Howard, Tipton, and Madison counties. After redistricting, HD32 was relocated to the suburban southern Hamilton County, picking up parts of Carmel and Fishers, as well as a small portion of northern Marion County.

==== Republican primary ====
===== Candidates =====
====== Declared ======
- Fred Glynn, Hamilton County Councilman
- Suzie Jaworowski, former chief of staff of the Office of Nuclear Energy
- Paul Nix

====== Declined ======
- Tony Cook, incumbent state representative

===== Results =====
Republican primary
Party	Candidate	Votes	%
Republican	Fred Glynn	1,844	44.3
Republican	Suzie Jaworowski	1,838	44.2
Republican	Paul Nix	479	11.5
Total votes		4,161	100.0

==== Democratic primary ====
===== Candidates =====
====== Declared ======
- Victoria Wilburn

===== Results =====
Democratic primary
Party	Candidate	Votes	%
Democratic	Victoria Wilburn	Unopposed	100.0
Total votes			100.0

==== General election ====
===== Results =====
General election
Party	Candidate	Votes	%	±%
Democratic	Victoria Wilburn	12,508	50.5	
Republican	Fred Glynn	12,235	49.5	
Total votes		24,768	100.0	
Democratic gain from Republican				

=== District 33 ===
The district had been represented by Republican John Prescott since 2018. Prescott was re-elected with 72.5% of the vote in 2020.

==== Republican primary ====
===== Candidates =====
====== Declared ======
- Brittany Kloer, candidate for this district in 2020
- John Prescott, incumbent state representative

===== Results =====
Republican primary
Party	Candidate	Votes	%
Republican	John Prescott (incumbent)	4,722	58.0
Republican	Brittany Kloer	3,421	42.0
Total votes		8,143	100.0

==== Democratic primary ====
===== Candidates =====
====== Declared ======
- John E. Bartlett

===== Results =====
Democratic primary
Party	Candidate	Votes	%
Democratic	John E. Bartlett	Unopposed	100.0
Total votes			100.0

==== General election ====
===== Results =====
General election
Party	Candidate	Votes	%	±%
Republican	John Prescott (incumbent)	13,979	70.4	
Democratic	John E. Bartlett	5,882	29.6	
Total votes		19,861	100.0	
Republican hold				

=== District 34 ===
The district had been represented by Democrat Sue Errington since 2012. Errington was re-elected with 56.4% of the vote in 2020.

==== Republican primary ====
===== Candidates =====
====== Declared ======
- Dale Basham, retired teacher and nominee for this district in 2020
- Susan Dillion

===== Results =====
Republican primary
Party	Candidate	Votes	%
Republican	Dale Basham	1,620	61.0
Republican	Susan Dillion	1,036	39.0
Total votes		2,654	100.0

==== Democratic primary ====
===== Candidates =====
====== Declared ======
- Sue Errington, incumbent state representative

===== Results =====
Democratic primary
Party	Candidate	Votes	%
Democratic	Sue Errington (incumbent)	Unopposed	100.0
Total votes			100.0

==== General election ====
===== Results =====
General election
Party	Candidate	Votes	%	±%
Democratic	Sue Errington (incumbent)	7,659	52.8	
Republican	Dale Basham	6,849	47.2	
Total votes		14,508	100.0	
Democratic hold				

=== District 35 ===
The district had been represented by Republican Elizabeth Rowray since 2020. Rowray was first elected with 55.3% of the vote in 2020.

==== Republican primary ====
===== Candidates =====
====== Declared ======
- Elizabeth Rowray, incumbent state representative

===== Results =====
Republican primary
Party	Candidate	Votes	%
Republican	Elizabeth Rowray (incumbent)	Unopposed	100.0
Total votes			100.0

==== Democratic primary ====
===== Candidates =====
====== Declared ======
- Brad Sowinski

===== Results =====
Democratic primary
Party	Candidate	Votes	%
Democratic	Brad Sowinski	Unopposed	100.0
Total votes			100.0

==== General election ====
===== Results =====
General election
Party	Candidate	Votes	%	±%
Republican	Elizabeth Rowray (incumbent)	14,948	70.0	
Democratic	Brad Sowinski	6,393	30.0	
Total votes		21,341	100.0	
Republican hold				

=== District 36 ===
The district had been represented by Democrat Terri Austin since 2002. Austin was re-elected with 53% of the vote in 2020.

==== Republican primary ====
===== Candidates =====
====== Declared ======
- Kyle Pierce, nominee for this district in 2020

===== Results =====
Republican primary
Party	Candidate	Votes	%
Republican	Kyle Pierce	Unopposed	100.0
Total votes			100.0

==== Democratic primary ====
===== Candidates =====
====== Declared ======
- Terri Austin, incumbent state representative

===== Results =====
Democratic primary
Party	Candidate	Votes	%
Democratic	Terri Austin (incumbent)	Unopposed	100.0
Total votes			100.0

==== General election ====
===== Results =====
General election
Party	Candidate	Votes	%	±%
Republican	Kyle Pierce	8,904	50.9	
Democratic	Terri Austin (incumbent)	8,581	49.1	
Total votes		17,485	100.0	
Republican gain from Democratic				

=== District 37 ===
The district had been represented by Republican Todd Huston since 2012. Huston was re-elected with 56.2% of the vote in 2020.

==== Republican primary ====
===== Candidates =====
====== Declared ======
- Todd Huston, incumbent state representative

===== Results =====
Republican primary
Party	Candidate	Votes	%
Republican	Todd Huston (incumbent)	Unopposed	100.0
Total votes			100.0

==== General election ====
===== Results =====
General election
Party	Candidate	Votes	%	±%
Republican	Todd Huston (incumbent)	Unopposed	10.0	
Total votes		16,069	100.0	
Republican hold				

=== District 38 ===
The district had been represented by Republican Heath VanNatter since 2010. VanNatter was re-elected with 71.5% of the vote in 2020.

==== Republican primary ====
===== Candidates =====
====== Declared ======
- Heath VanNatter, incumbent state representative

===== Results =====
Republican primary
Party	Candidate	Votes	%
Republican	Heath VanNatter (incumbent)	Unopposed	100.0
Total votes			100.0

==== General election ====
===== Results =====
General election
Party	Candidate	Votes	%	±%
Republican	Heath VanNatter (incumbent)	Unopposed	100.0	
Total votes		19,183	100.0	
Republican hold				

=== District 39 ===
The district had been represented by Republican Jerry Torr since 1996. Torr was re-elected with 53.6% of the vote in 2020.

==== Republican primary ====
===== Candidates =====
====== Declared ======
- Jerry Torr, incumbent state representative

===== Results =====
Republican primary
Party	Candidate	Votes	%
Republican	Jerry Torr (incumbent)	Unopposed	100.0
Total votes			100.0

==== General election ====
===== Results =====
General election
Party	Candidate	Votes	%	±%
Republican	Jerry Torr (incumbent)	14,757	52.4	
Democratic	Matt McNally	13,430	47.6	
Total votes		28,187	100.0	
Republican hold				

=== District 40 ===
The district had been represented by Republican Greg Steuerwald since his appointment in 2007. Steuerwald was re-elected with 60% of the vote in 2020.

==== Republican primary ====
===== Candidates =====
====== Declared ======
- Greg Steuerwald, incumbent state representative

===== Results =====
Republican primary
Party	Candidate	Votes	%
Republican	Greg Steuerwald (incumbent)	Unopposed	100.0
Total votes			100.0

==== General election ====
===== Results =====
General election
Party	Candidate	Votes	%	±%
Republican	Greg Steuerwald (incumbent)	Unopposed	100.0	
Total votes		12,883	100.0	
Republican hold				

=== District 41 ===
The district had been represented by Republican Tim Brown since 1994. Brown was re-elected with 75.3% of the vote in 2020. He did not file to run for another term.

==== Republican primary ====
===== Candidates =====
====== Declared ======
- Richard Bagsby, pastor
- Mark Genda, funeral home owner
- Shane Weist, sales manager

===== Results =====
Republican primary
Party	Candidate	Votes	%
Republican	Mark Genda	3,326	42.6
Republican	Shane Weist	2,298	29.4
Republican	Richard Bagsby	2,189	28.0
Total votes		7,813	100.0

==== Democratic primary ====
===== Candidates =====
====== Declared ======
- Greg A. Woods, nominee for this district in 2020

===== Results =====
Democratic primary
Party	Candidate	Votes	%
Democratic	Greg A. Woods	Unopposed	100.0
Total votes			100.0

==== General election ====
===== Results =====
General election
Party	Candidate	Votes	%	±%
Republican	Mark Genda	12,813	75.3	
Democratic	Greg A. Woods	4,212	24.7	
Total votes		17,025	100.0	
Republican hold				

=== District 42 ===
The district had been represented by Republican Alan Morrison since 2012. Morrison was re-elected with 66.8% of the vote in 2020.

==== Republican primary ====
===== Candidates =====
====== Declared ======
- Alan Morrison, incumbent state representative

===== Results =====
Republican primary
Party	Candidate	Votes	%
Republican	Alan Morrison (incumbent)	Unopposed	100.0
Total votes			100.0

==== General election ====
===== Results =====
General election
Party	Candidate	Votes	%	±%
Republican	Alan Morrison (incumbent)	13,800	68.4	
Democratic	Mark Spelbring	6,379	31.6	
Total votes		20,179	100.0	
Republican hold				

=== District 43 ===
The district had been represented by Democrat Tonya Pfaff since 2018. Pfaff was re-elected with 57.5% of the vote in 2020.

==== Republican primary ====
===== Candidates =====
====== Declared ======
- Andrew McNeil

===== Results =====
Republican primary
Party	Candidate	Votes	%
Republican	Andrew McNeil	Unopposed	100.0
Total votes			100.0

==== Democratic primary ====
===== Candidates =====
====== Declared ======
- Tonya Pfaff, incumbent state representative

===== Results =====
Democratic primary
Party	Candidate	Votes	%
Democratic	Tonya Pfaff (incumbent)	Unopposed	100.0
Total votes			100.0

==== General election ====
===== Results =====
General election
Party	Candidate	Votes	%	±%
Democratic	Tonya Pfaff (incumbent)	8,893	58.4	
Republican	Andrew McNeil	6,336	41.6	
Total votes		15,229	100.0	
Democratic hold				

=== District 44 ===
The district had been represented by Republican Beau Baird since 2018. Baird was re-elected unopposed in 2020.

==== Republican primary ====
===== Candidates =====
====== Declared ======
- Beau Baird, incumbent state representative

===== Results =====
Republican primary
Party	Candidate	Votes	%
Republican	Beau Baird (incumbent)	Unopposed	100.0
Total votes			100.0

==== General election ====
===== Results =====
General election
Party	Candidate	Votes	%	±%
Republican	Beau Baird (incumbent)	Unopposed	100.0	
Total votes		14,229	100.0	
Republican hold				

=== District 45 ===
The district had been represented by Republican Bruce Borders since 2014, and he had previously held the office from 2004 to 2012. Borders was re-elected unopposed in 2020. Jeff Ellington from the 62nd district was redistricted into this district, triggering a primary.

==== Republican primary ====
===== Candidates =====
====== Declared ======
- Bruce Borders, incumbent state representative
- Jeff Ellington, incumbent state representative for the 62nd district

===== Results =====
Republican primary
Party	Candidate	Votes	%
Republican	Bruce Borders (incumbent)	4,443	53.3
Republican	Jeff Ellington	3,899	46.7
Total votes		8,342	100.0

==== General election ====
===== Results =====
General election
Party	Candidate	Votes	%	±%
Republican	Bruce Borders (incumbent)	13,413	69.8	
Independent	Cody Alsman	5,805	30.2	
Total votes		19,218	100.0	
Republican hold				

=== District 46 ===
The district had been represented by Republican Bob Heaton since 2010. Heaton was re-elected unopposed in 2020.

==== Republican primary ====
===== Candidates =====
====== Declared ======
- Bob Heaton, incumbent state representative

===== Results =====
Republican primary
Party	Candidate	Votes	%
Republican	Bob Heaton (incumbent)	Unopposed	100.0
Total votes			100.0

==== Democratic primary ====
===== Candidates =====
====== Declared ======
- Kurtis Cummings

===== Results =====
Democratic primary
Party	Candidate	Votes	%
Democratic	Kurtis Cummings	Unopposed	100.0
Total votes			100.0

==== General election ====
===== Results =====
General election
Party	Candidate	Votes	%	±%
Republican	Bob Heaton (incumbent)	13,420	66.7	
Democratic	Kurtis Cummings	6,686	33.3	
Total votes		20,106	100.0	
Republican hold				

=== District 47 ===
The district had been represented by Republican John Young since 2016. Young was re-elected unopposed in 2020.

==== Republican primary ====
===== Candidates =====
====== Declared ======
- Luke Campbell, U.S. Army veteran, evangelist, and candidate for the 57th district in 2018
- Robb Greene
- Scott Strother
- John Young, incumbent state representative

===== Results =====
Republican primary
Party	Candidate	Votes	%
Republican	Robb Greene	3,456	47.9
Republican	John Young (incumbent)	2,153	29.9
Republican	Luke Campbell	1,400	19.4
Republican	Scott Strother	204	2.8
Total votes		7,213	100.0

==== General election ====
===== Results =====
General election
Party	Candidate	Votes	%	±%
Republican	Robb Greene	Unopposed	100	
Total votes		15,803	100.0	
Republican hold				

=== District 48 ===
The district had been represented by Republican Doug Miller since 2014. Miller was re-elected with 64.3% of the vote in 2020.

==== Republican primary ====
===== Candidates =====
====== Declared ======
- Doug Miller, incumbent state representative

===== Results =====
Republican primary
Party	Candidate	Votes	%
Republican	Doug Miller (incumbent)	Unopposed	100.0
Total votes			100.0

==== General election ====
===== Results =====
General election
Party	Candidate	Votes	%	±%
Republican	Doug Miller (incumbent)	Unopposed	100.0	
Total votes		11,950	100.0	
Republican hold				

=== District 49 ===
The district had been represented by Republican Joanna King since her appointment in 2020.

==== Republican primary ====
===== Candidates =====
====== Declared ======
- Joanna King, incumbent state representative

===== Results =====
Republican primary
Party	Candidate	Votes	%
Republican	Joanna King (incumbent)	Unopposed	100.0
Total votes			100.0

==== General election ====
===== Results =====
General election
Party	Candidate	Votes	%	±%
Republican	Joanna King (incumbent)	10,422	67.2	
Democratic	Amanda Qualls	5,095	22.4	
Total votes		15,517	100.0	
Republican hold				

=== District 50 ===
The district had been represented by Republican Dan Leonard since 2002. Leonard was re-elected with 71.5% of the vote in 2020.

==== Republican primary ====
===== Candidates =====
====== Declared ======
- Dan Leonard, incumbent state representative
- Lorissa Sweet, Wabash County, Indiana councilwoman

===== Results =====
Republican primary
Party	Candidate	Votes	%
Republican	Lorissa Sweet	4,091	56.6
Republican	Dan Leonard (incumbent)	3,140	43.4
Total votes		7,231	100.0

==== Democratic primary ====
===== Candidates =====
====== Declared ======
- Tammari Ingalls

===== Results =====
Democratic primary
Party	Candidate	Votes	%
Democratic	Tammari Ingalls	Unopposed	100.0
Total votes			100.0

==== General election ====
===== Results =====
General election
Party	Candidate	Votes	%	±%
Republican	Lorissa Sweet	16,417	77.6	
Democratic	Tammari Ingalls	4,739	22.4	
Total votes		21,156	100.0	
Republican hold				

== Districts 51–75 ==
=== District 51 ===
The district had been represented by Republican Dennis Zent since 2012. Zent was re-elected with 77.1% of the vote in 2020.

==== Republican primary ====
===== Candidates =====
====== Declared ======
- Dennis Zent, incumbent state representative

===== Results =====
Republican primary
Party	Candidate	Votes	%
Republican	Dennis Zent (incumbent)	Unopposed	100
Total votes			100.0

==== Democratic primary ====
===== Candidates =====
====== Declared ======
- Jestin Coler
- Michael Travis

===== Results =====
Democratic primary
Party	Candidate	Votes	%
Democratic	Michael Travis	422	67.5
Democratic	Jestin Coler	203	32.5
Total votes		625	100.0

==== General election ====
===== Results =====
General election
Party	Candidate	Votes	%	±%
Republican	Dennis Zent (incumbent)	10,758	75.6	
Democratic	Michael Travis	3,469	24.4	
Total votes		14,222	100.0	
Republican hold				

=== District 52 ===
The district had been represented by Republican Ben Smaltz since 2012. Smaltz was re-elected with 72% of the vote in 2020.

==== Republican primary ====
===== Candidates =====
====== Declared ======
- Ben Smaltz, incumbent state representative

===== Results =====
Republican primary
Party	Candidate	Votes	%
Republican	Ben Smaltz (incumbent)	Unopposed	100
Total votes			100.0

==== Libertarian convention ====
===== Candidates =====
====== Declared ======
- Morgan Rigg

==== General election ====
===== Results =====
General election
Party	Candidate	Votes	%	±%
Republican	Ben Smaltz (incumbent)	13,386	81.7	
Libertarian	Morgan Rigg	3,000	18.3	
Total votes		16,386	100.0	
Republican hold				

=== District 53 ===
The district had been represented by Republican Bob Cherry since 1998. Cherry was re-elected unopposed in 2020.

==== Republican primary ====
===== Candidates =====
====== Declared ======
- Bob Cherry, incumbent state representative

===== Results =====
Republican primary
Party	Candidate	Votes	%
Republican	Bob Cherry (incumbent)	Unopposed	100
Total votes			100.0

==== General election ====
===== Results =====
General election
Party	Candidate	Votes	%	±%
Republican	Bob Cherry (incumbent)	Unopposed	100.0	
Total votes		15,978	100.0	
Republican hold				

=== District 54 ===
The district had been represented by Republican Tom Saunders since 1996. Saunders was re-elected unopposed in 2020. He did not file to run for another term. He announced he would be retiring in 2022 after serving the district for 25 years.

==== Republican primary ====
===== Candidates =====
====== Declared ======
- Cory Criswell, small business owner
- Nansi Custer
- Joshua Gillmore
- Melissa Meltzer
- Betsy Mills, Henry County Council member
- Bobbi Plummer, Henry County Commissioner
- Gayla Taylor, communications and marketing specialist

====== Declined ======
- Tom Saunders, incumbent state representative

===== Results =====
Republican primary
Party	Candidate	Votes	%
Republican	Cory Criswell	3,420	39.6
Republican	Betsy Mills	1,388	16.1
Republican	Bobbi Plummer	1,005	11.6
Republican	Melissa Meltzer	977	11.3
Republican	Joshua Gillmore	669	7.8
Republican	Nansi Custer	543	6.3
Republican	Heather Carie	457	5.3
Republican	Gayla Taylor	168	1.9
Total votes		8,627	100.0

==== Democratic primary ====
===== Candidates =====
====== Declared ======
- Nan Polk, New Castle School Board Member

===== Results =====
Democratic primary
Party	Candidate	Votes	%
Democratic	Nan Polk	Unopposed	100
Total votes			100.0

==== General election ====
===== Results =====
General election
Party	Candidate	Votes	%	±%
Republican	Cory Criswell	13,886	73.7	
Democratic	Nan Polk	4,955	26.3	
Total votes		18,841	100.0	
Republican hold				

=== District 55 ===
The district had been represented by Republican Cindy Ziemke since 2012. Ziemke was re-elected unopposed in 2020. She did not file to run for another term. She announced she would be retiring in 2022.

==== Republican primary ====
===== Candidates =====
====== Declared ======
- John Moton
- Lindsay Patterson
- Curtis Ward
- Dave Welsh

====== Declined ======
- Cindy Ziemke, incumbent state representative

===== Results =====
Republican primary
Party	Candidate	Votes	%
Republican	Lindsay Patterson	3,166	39.2
Republican	Curtis Ward	2,041	25.3
Republican	Dave Welsh	1,583	19.6
Republican	John Moton	1,277	15.8
Total votes		8,067	100.0

==== General election ====
===== Results =====
General election
Party	Candidate	Votes	%	±%
Republican	Lindsay Patterson	Unopposed	100.0	
Total votes		17,233	100.0	
Republican hold				

=== District 56 ===
The district had been represented by Republican Brad Barrett since 2018. Barrett was re-elected unopposed in 2020.

==== Republican primary ====
===== Candidates =====
====== Declared ======
- Brad Barrett, incumbent state representative
- Mark Pierce

===== Results =====
Republican primary
Party	Candidate	Votes	%
Republican	Brad Barrett (incumbent)	3,534	73.9
Republican	Mark Pierce	1,245	26.1
Total votes		4,779	100.0

==== General election ====
===== Results =====
General election
Party	Candidate	Votes	%	±%
Republican	Brad Barrett (incumbent)	11,764	69.9	
Democratic	C. Yvonne Washington	5,057	30.1	
Total votes		16,821	100.0	
Republican hold				

=== District 57 ===
The district had been represented by Republican Sean Eberhart since 2006. Eberhart was re-elected unopposed in 2020. Eberhart did not file to run for another term.

==== Republican primary ====
===== Candidates =====
====== Declared ======
- Melinda Griesemer
- Craig Haggard

===== Results =====
Republican primary
Party	Candidate	Votes	%
Republican	Craig Haggard	3,315	66.7
Republican	Melinda Griesemer	1,658	33.3
Total votes		4,973	100.0

==== General election ====
===== Results =====
General election
Party	Candidate	Votes	%	±%
Republican	Craig Haggard	Unopposed	100.0	
Total votes		14,055	100.0	
Republican hold				

=== District 58 ===
The district had been represented by Republican Michelle Davis since 2020. Davis was first elected with 67.6% of the vote in 2020.

==== Republican primary ====
===== Candidates =====
====== Declared ======
- Michelle Davis, incumbent state representative

===== Results =====
Republican primary
Party	Candidate	Votes	%
Republican	Michelle Davis (incumbent)	Unopposed	100.0
Total votes			100.0

==== General election ====
===== Results =====
General election
Party	Candidate	Votes	%	±%
Republican	Michelle Davis (incumbent)	Unopposed	100.0	
Total votes		12,112	100.0	
Republican hold				

=== District 59 ===
The district had been represented by Republican Ryan Lauer since 2018. Lauer was re-elected with 59.9% of the vote in 2020.

==== Republican primary ====
===== Candidates =====
====== Declared ======
- Ryan Lauer, incumbent state representative
- William Nash

===== Results =====
Republican primary
Party	Candidate	Votes	%
Republican	Ryan Lauer (incumbent)	3,751	68.1
Republican	William Nash	1,760	31.9
Total votes		5,511	100.0

==== Democratic primary ====
===== Candidates =====
====== Declared ======
- Ross Thomas, nominee for Indiana State Senate District 41 in 2018

===== Results =====
Democratic primary
Party	Candidate	Votes	%
Democratic	Ross Thomas	Unopposed	100.0
Total votes			100.0

==== General election ====
===== Results =====
General election
Party	Candidate	Votes	%	±%
Republican	Ryan Lauer (incumbent)	11,019	61.3	
Democratic	Ross Thomas	6,949	38.7	
Total votes		17,968	100.0	
Republican hold				

=== District 60 ===
The district had been represented by Republican Peggy Mayfield since 2012. Mayfield was re-elected with 63.5% of the vote in 2020.

==== Republican primary ====
===== Candidates =====
====== Declared ======
- Brittany Caroll, attorney
- Peggy Mayfield, incumbent state representative

===== Results =====
Republican primary
Party	Candidate	Votes	%
Republican	Peggy Mayfield (incumbent)	4,365	64.2
Republican	Brittany Carroll	2,438	35.8
Total votes		6,803	100.0

==== General election ====
===== Results =====
General election
Party	Candidate	Votes	%	±%
Republican	Peggy Mayfield (incumbent)	16,633	75.4	
Democratic	Kathy Thorpe	5,415	24.6	
Total votes		22,048	100.0	
Republican hold				

=== District 61 ===
The district had been represented by Democrat Matt Pierce since 2002. Pierce was re-elected unopposed in 2020.

==== Democratic primary ====
===== Candidates =====
====== Declared ======
- Matt Pierce, incumbent state representative

===== Results =====
Democratic primary
Party	Candidate	Votes	%
Democratic	Matt Pierce (incumbent)	Unopposed	100.0
Total votes			100.0

==== General election ====
===== Results =====
General election
Party	Candidate	Votes	%	±%
Democratic	Matt Pierce (incumbent)	Unopposed	100.0	
Total votes		11,698	100.0	
Democratic hold				

=== District 62 ===
The district had been represented by Republican Jeff Ellington since his appointment in 2015. Ellington was re-elected with 60.4% of the vote in 2020. He was redistricted to the 45th district.

==== Republican primary ====
===== Candidates =====
====== Declared ======
- Dave Hall, Jackson County councilman
- Greg Knott, IT technician

====== Declined ======
- Jeff Ellington, incumbent state representative (running in 45th district)

===== Results =====
Republican primary
Party	Candidate	Votes	%
Republican	Dave Hall	2,896	56.7
Republican	Greg Knott	2,212	43.3
Total votes		5,108	100.0

==== Democratic primary ====
===== Candidates =====
====== Declared ======
- Penny Githens, Monroe County commissioner
- Brad Swain, Monroe County sheriff

===== Results =====
Democratic primary
Party	Candidate	Votes	%
Democratic	Penny Githens	2,892	68.2
Democratic	Brad Swain	1,349	31.8
Total votes		4,241	100.0

==== General election ====
===== Results =====
General election
Party	Candidate	Votes	%	±%
Republican	Dave Hall	13,037	50.1	
Democratic	Penny Githens	12,963	49.9	
Total votes		26,000	100.0	
Republican hold				

=== District 63 ===
The district had been represented by Republican Shane Lindauer since his appointment in 2017. Lindauer was re-elected with 73.8% of the vote in 2020.

==== Republican primary ====
===== Candidates =====
====== Declared ======
- Shane Lindauer, incumbent state representative

===== Results =====
Republican primary
Party	Candidate	Votes	%
Republican	Shane Lindauer (incumbent)	Unopposed	100.0
Total votes			100.0

==== Democratic primary ====
===== Candidates =====
====== Declared ======
- Teresa Kendall

===== Results =====
Democratic primary
Party	Candidate	Votes	%
Democratic	Teresa Kendall	Unopposed	100.0
Total votes			100.0

==== General election ====
===== Results =====
General election
Party	Candidate	Votes	%	±%
Republican	Shane Lindauer (incumbent)	14,558	76.9	
Democratic	Teresa Kendall	4,364	23.1	
Total votes		18,922	100.0	
Republican hold				

=== District 64 ===
The district had been represented by Republican Matt Hostettler since 2018. Hostettler was re-elected with 75.9% of the vote in 2020.

==== Republican primary ====
===== Candidates =====
====== Declared ======
- Matt Hostettler, incumbent state representative

===== Results =====
Republican primary
Party	Candidate	Votes	%
Republican	Matt Hostettler (incumbent)	Unopposed	100.0
Total votes			100.0

==== General election ====
===== Results =====
General election
Party	Candidate	Votes	%	±%
Republican	Matt Hostettler (incumbent)	Unopposed	100.0	
Total votes		17,048	100.0	
Republican hold				

=== District 65 ===
The district had been represented by Republican Christopher May since 2016. May was re-elected with 72.9% of the vote in 2020.

==== Republican primary ====
===== Candidates =====
====== Declared ======
- John Lee
- Christopher May, incumbent state representative

===== Results =====
Republican primary
Party	Candidate	Votes	%
Republican	Christopher May (incumbent)	5,962	76.9
Republican	John Lee	1,786	23.1
Total votes		7,748	100.0

==== Democratic primary ====
===== Candidates =====
====== Declared ======
- Kevin Goodman, child protection investigator

===== Results =====
Democratic primary
Party	Candidate	Votes	%
Democratic	Kevin Goodman	Unopposed	100.0
Total votes			100.0

==== General election ====
===== Results =====
General election
Party	Candidate	Votes	%	±%
Republican	Christopher May (incumbent)	14,648	77.7	
Democratic	Kevin Goodman	4,198	22.3	
Total votes		18,846	100.0	
Republican hold				

=== District 66 ===
The district had been represented by Republican Zach Payne since 2020. Payne was first elected with 55.8% of the vote in 2020.

==== Republican primary ====
===== Candidates =====
====== Declared ======
- Zach Payne, incumbent state representative

===== Results =====
Republican primary
Party	Candidate	Votes	%
Republican	Zach Payne (incumbent)	Unopposed	100.0
Total votes			100.0

==== General election ====
===== Results =====
General election
Party	Candidate	Votes	%	±%
Republican	Zach Payne (incumbent)	14,565	69.9	
Democratic	Nancy McDevitt	6,260	30.1	
Total votes		20,825	100.0	
Republican hold				

=== District 67 ===
The district had been represented by Republican Randy Frye since 2010. Frye was re-elected unopposed in 2020.

==== Republican primary ====
===== Candidates =====
====== Declared ======
- Randy Frye, incumbent state representative

===== Results =====
Republican primary
Party	Candidate	Votes	%
Republican	Randy Frye (incumbent)	Unopposed	100.0
Total votes			100.0

==== General election ====
===== Results =====
General election
Party	Candidate	Votes	%	±%
Republican	Randy Frye (incumbent)	Unopposed	100.0	
Total votes		16,855	100.0	
Republican hold				

=== District 68 ===
The district had been represented by Republican Randy Lyness since his appointment in 2015. Lyness was re-elected unopposed in 2020.

==== Republican primary ====
===== Candidates =====
====== Declared ======
- Randy Lyness, incumbent state representative

===== Results =====
Republican primary
Party	Candidate	Votes	%
Republican	Randy Lyness (incumbent)	Unopposed	100.0
Total votes			100.0

==== General election ====
===== Results =====
General election
Party	Candidate	Votes	%	±%
Republican	Randy Lyness (incumbent)	Unopposed	100.0	
Total votes		16,543	100.0	
Republican hold				

=== District 69 ===
The district had been represented by Republican Jim Lucas since 2012. Lucas was re-elected with 67.3% of the vote in 2020.

==== Republican primary ====
===== Candidates =====
====== Declared ======
- Jim Lucas, incumbent state representative

====== Declined ======
- Steve Davisson, incumbent state representative for the 73rd district

===== Results =====
Republican primary
Party	Candidate	Votes	%
Republican	Jim Lucas (incumbent)	Unopposed	100.0
Total votes			100.0

==== Democratic primary ====
===== Candidates =====
====== Declared ======
- Chad Harmon, subcontract manager

===== Results =====
Democratic primary
Party	Candidate	Votes	%
Democratic	Chad Harmon	Unopposed	100.0
Total votes			100.0

==== General election ====
===== Results =====
General election
Party	Candidate	Votes	%	±%
Republican	Jim Lucas (incumbent)	12,526	73.7	
Democratic	Chad Harmon	4,475	26.3	
Total votes		17,001	100.0	
Republican hold				

=== District 70 ===
The district had been represented by Republican Karen Engleman since 2016. Engleman was re-elected with 70.7% of the vote in 2020.

==== Republican primary ====
===== Candidates =====
====== Declared ======
- Karen Engleman, incumbent state representative

===== Results =====
Republican primary
Party	Candidate	Votes	%
Republican	Karen Engleman (incumbent)	Unopposed	100.0
Total votes			100.0

==== Democratic primary ====
===== Candidates =====
====== Declared ======
- Jason Shemanski

===== Results =====
Democratic primary
Party	Candidate	Votes	%
Democratic	Jason Shemanski	Unopposed	100.0
Total votes			100.0

==== General election ====
===== Results =====
General election
Party	Candidate	Votes	%	±%
Republican	Karen Engleman (incumbent)	18,018	75.0	
Democratic	Jason Shemanski	6,014	25.0	
Total votes		24,032	100.0	
Republican hold				

=== District 71 ===
The district had been represented by Democrat Rita Fleming since 2018. Fleming was re-elected with 77.6% of the vote in 2020.

==== Republican primary ====
===== Candidates =====
====== Declared ======
- Scott Hawkins, Jeffersonville City Councilman at-large

===== Results =====
Republican primary
Party	Candidate	Votes	%
Republican	Scott Hawkins	Unopposed	100.0
Total votes			100.0

==== Democratic primary ====
===== Candidates =====
====== Declared ======
- Rita Fleming, incumbent state representative

===== Results =====
Democratic primary
Party	Candidate	Votes	%
Democratic	Rita Fleming (incumbent)	Unopposed	100.0
Total votes			100.0

==== General election ====
===== Results =====
General election
Party	Candidate	Votes	%	±%
Democratic	Rita Fleming (incumbent)	9,302	50.6	
Republican	Scott Hawkins	9,076	49.4	
Total votes		18,378	100.0	
Democratic hold				

=== District 72 ===
The district had been represented by Republican Edward Clere since 2008. Clere was re-elected with 59.4% of the vote in 2020.

==== Republican primary ====
===== Candidates =====
====== Declared ======
- Edward Clere, incumbent state representative
- Jacqueline Grubbs
- Tom Jones

===== Results =====
Republican primary
Party	Candidate	Votes	%
Republican	Edward Clere (incumbent)	3,021	50.2
Republican	Jacqueline Grubbs	2,208	36.7
Republican	Tom Jones	786	13.1
Total votes		6,015	100.0

==== Democratic primary ====
===== Candidates =====
====== Declared ======
- Keil Roark

===== Results =====
Democratic primary
Party	Candidate	Votes	%
Democratic	Keil Roark	Unopposed	100.0
Total votes			100.0

==== General election ====
===== Results =====
General election
Party	Candidate	Votes	%	±%
Republican	Edward Clere (incumbent)	13,386	60.4	
Democratic	Keil Roark	8,773	39.6	
Total votes		22,159	100.0	
Republican hold				

=== District 73 ===
The district had been represented by Republican Steve Davisson since 2010. Davisson was re-elected unopposed in 2020. Davisson was redistricted to the 68th district and was also running as a candidate for Indiana's 9th congressional district. Davisson died from cancer in September 2021.

==== Republican primary ====
===== Candidates =====
====== Declared ======
- Bob Carmony
- Edward Comstock II, candidate for the 57th district in 2020
- Jennifer Meltzer, Shelbyville attorney

===== Results =====
Republican primary
Party	Candidate	Votes	%
Republican	Jennifer Meltzer	3,679	56.7
Republican	Bob Carmony	2,108	32.5
Republican	Edward Comstock II	698	10.8
Total votes		6,485	100.0

==== General election ====
===== Results =====
General election
Party	Candidate	Votes	%	±%
Republican	Jennifer Meltzer	13,437	77.1	
Democratic	Mimi Pruett	3,988	22.9	
Total votes		17,425	100.0	
Republican hold				

=== District 74 ===
The district had been represented by Republican Stephen Bartels since his appointment in 2017. Bartels was re-elected unopposed in 2020.

==== Republican primary ====
===== Candidates =====
====== Declared ======
- Stephen Bartels, incumbent state representative

===== Results =====
Republican primary
Party	Candidate	Votes	%
Republican	Stephen Bartels (incumbent)	Unopposed	100.0
Total votes			100.0

==== General election ====
===== Results =====
General election
Party	Candidate	Votes	%	±%
Republican	Stephen Bartels (incumbent)	Unopposed	100.0	
Total votes		17,973	100.0	
Republican hold				

=== District 75 ===
The district had been represented by Republican Cindy Ledbetter since 2020. Ledbetter was first elected with 61.2% of the vote in 2020.

==== Republican primary ====
===== Candidates =====
====== Declared ======
- Cindy Ledbetter, incumbent state representative

===== Results =====
Republican primary
Party	Candidate	Votes	%
Republican	Cindy Ledbetter (incumbent)	Unopposed	100.0
Total votes			100.0

==== General election ====
===== Results =====
General election
Party	Candidate	Votes	%	±%
Republican	Cindy Ledbetter (incumbent)	14,841	70.5	
Democratic	Zack Davis	6,201	29.5	
Total votes		21,042	100.0	
Republican hold				

== Districts 76–100 ==
=== District 76 ===
The district had been represented by Republican Wendy McNamara since 2010. McNamara was re-elected with 64% of the vote in 2020.

==== Republican primary ====
===== Candidates =====
====== Declared ======
- Wendy McNamara, incumbent state representative

===== Results =====
Republican primary
Party	Candidate	Votes	%
Republican	Wendy McNamara (incumbent)	Unopposed	100.0
Total votes			100.0

==== Democratic primary ====
===== Candidates =====
====== Declared ======
- Katherine Rybak

===== Results =====
Democratic primary
Party	Candidate	Votes	%
Democratic	Katherine Rybak	Unopposed	100.0
Total votes			100.0

==== General election ====
===== Results =====
General election
Party	Candidate	Votes	%	±%
Republican	Wendy McNamara (incumbent)	12,577	60.2	
Democratic	Katherine Rybak	6,460	30.9	
Independent	Cheryl Batteiger-Smith	1,860	8.9	
Total votes		20,897	100.0	
Republican hold				

=== District 77 ===
The district had. been represented by Democrat Ryan Hatfield since 2016. Hatfield was re-elected with 61.2% of the vote in 2020.

==== Democratic primary ====
===== Candidates =====
====== Declared ======
- Ryan Hatfield, incumbent state representative

===== Results =====
Democratic primary
Party	Candidate	Votes	%
Democratic	Ryan Hatfield (incumbent)	Unopposed	100.0
Total votes			100.0

==== Libertarian convention ====
===== Candidates =====
====== Declared ======
- Jada Burton, student

==== General election ====
===== Results =====
General election
Party	Candidate	Votes	%	±%
Democratic	Ryan Hatfield (incumbent)	8,237	76.7	
Libertarian	Jada Burton	2,508	23.3	
Total votes		10,745	100.0	
Democratic hold				

=== District 78 ===
The district had been represented by Republican Tim O'Brien since his appointment in 2021.

==== Republican primary ====
===== Candidates =====
====== Declared ======
- Tim O'Brien, incumbent state representative
- Sean Selby

===== Results =====
Republican primary
Party	Candidate	Votes	%
Republican	Tim O'Brien (incumbent)	2,228	65.9
Republican	Sean Selby	1,151	34.1
Total votes		3,379	100.0

==== Democratic primary ====
===== Candidates =====
====== Declared ======
- Jason Salstrom

===== Results =====
Democratic primary
Party	Candidate	Votes	%
Democratic	Jason Salstrom	Unopposed	100.0
Total votes			100.0

==== General election ====
===== Results =====
General election
Party	Candidate	Votes	%	±%
Republican	Tim O'Brien (incumbent)	13,143	62.7	
Democratic	Jason Salstrom	7,818	37.3	
Total votes		20,961	100.0	
Republican hold				

=== District 79 ===
The district had been represented by Republican Matt Lehman since 2008. Lehman was re-elected unopposed in 2020.

==== Republican primary ====
===== Candidates =====
====== Declared ======
- Matt Lehman, incumbent state representative
- Russ Mounsey, police officer

===== Results =====
Republican primary
Party	Candidate	Votes	%
Republican	Matt Lehman (incumbent)	5,268	67.0
Republican	Russ Mounsey	2,596	33.0
Total votes		7,864	100.0

==== General election ====
===== Results =====
General election
Party	Candidate	Votes	%	±%
Republican	Matt Lehman (incumbent)	Unopposed	100.0	
Total votes		15,679	100.0	
Republican hold				

=== District 80 ===
The district had been represented by Democrat Phil GiaQuinta since 2006. GiaQuinta was re-elected unopposed in 2020.

==== Democratic primary ====
===== Candidates =====
====== Declared ======
- Phil GiaQuinta, incumbent state representative

===== Results =====
Democratic primary
Party	Candidate	Votes	%
Democratic	Phil GiaQuinta (incumbent)	Unopposed	100.0
Total votes			100.0

==== General election ====
===== Results =====
General election
Party	Candidate	Votes	%	±%
Democratic	Phil GiaQuinta (incumbent)	Unopposed	100.0	
Total votes		7,697	100.0	
Democratic hold				

=== District 81 ===
The district had been represented by Republican Martin Carbaugh since 2012. Carbaugh was re-elected with 61.2% of the vote in 2020.

==== Republican primary ====
===== Candidates =====
====== Declared ======
- Martin Carbaugh, incumbent state representative
- David Mervar

===== Results =====
Republican primary
Party	Candidate	Votes	%
Republican	Martin Carbaugh (incumbent)	3,378	65.3
Republican	David Mervar	1,793	34.7
Total votes		5,171	100.0

==== General election ====
===== Results =====
General election
Party	Candidate	Votes	%	±%
Republican	Martin Carbaugh (incumbent)	1,143	99.7	
Independent	Abby Norden (write-in)	38	0.3	
Total votes			100.0	
Republican hold				

=== District 82 ===
The district had been represented by Republican David Abbott since his appointment in 2018. Abbott was re-elected unopposed in 2020. He was re-districted to District 18.

==== Republican primary ====
===== Candidates =====
====== Declared ======
- Davyd Jones

====== Declined ======
- David Abbott, incumbent state representative (running in district 18)

===== Results =====
Republican primary
Party	Candidate	Votes	%
Republican	Davyd Jones	Unopposed	100.0
Total votes			100.0

==== Democratic primary ====
===== Candidates =====
====== Declared ======
- Kyle Miller, small business owner and nominee for the 81st district in 2018 and 2020
- Melissa Rinehart, non-profit executive director
- Kathy Zoucha, nominee for the 85th district in 2016 and the 15th State Senate district in 2018

===== Results =====
Democratic primary
Party	Candidate	Votes	%
Democratic	Kyle Miller	990	49.0
Democratic	Melissa Rinehart	733	36.3
Democratic	Kathy Zoucha	296	14.7
Total votes		2,019	100.0

==== General election ====
===== Results =====
General election
Party	Candidate	Votes	%	±%
Democratic	Kyle Miller	7,270	56.4	
Republican	Davyd Jones	5,625	43.6	
Total votes		12,895	100.0	
Democratic gain from Republican				

=== District 83 ===
The district had been represented by Republican Christopher Judy since 2014. Judy was re-elected with 64.7% of the vote in 2020.

==== Republican primary ====
===== Candidates =====
====== Declared ======
- Christopher Judy, incumbent state representative

===== Results =====
Republican primary
Party	Candidate	Votes	%
Republican	Christopher Judy (incumbent)	Unopposed	100.0
Total votes			100.0

==== General election ====
===== Results =====
General election
Party	Candidate	Votes	%	±%
Republican	Christopher Judy (incumbent)	Unopposed	100.0	
Total votes		17,676	100.0	
Republican hold				

=== District 84 ===
The district had been represented by Republican Bob Morris since 2010. Morris was re-elected with 61.1% of the vote in 2020.

==== Republican primary ====
===== Candidates =====
====== Declared ======
- Bob Morris, incumbent state representative

===== Results =====
Republican primary
Party	Candidate	Votes	%
Republican	Bob Morris (incumbent)	Unopposed	100.0
Total votes			100.0

==== General election ====
===== Results =====
General election
Party	Candidate	Votes	%	±%
Republican	Bob Morris (incumbent)	Unopposed	100.0	
Total votes		13,824	100.0	
Republican hold				

=== District 85 ===
The district had been represented by Republican Dave Heine since 2016. Heine was re-elected with 71.8% of the vote in 2020.

==== Republican primary ====
===== Candidates =====
====== Declared ======
- Dave Heine, incumbent state representative
- Stan Jones
- Chris Pence

===== Results =====
Republican primary
Party	Candidate	Votes	%
Republican	Dave Heine (incumbent)	5,067	77.4
Republican	Stan Jones	760	11.6
Republican	Chris Pence	721	11.0
Total votes		6,548	100.0

==== General election ====
===== Results =====
General election
Party	Candidate	Votes	%	±%
Republican	Dave Heine (incumbent)	Unopposed	100.0	
Total votes		16,131	100.0	
Republican hold				

=== District 86 ===
The district had been represented by Democrat Ed DeLaney since 2008. DeLaney was re-elected with 70% of the vote in 2020.

==== Republican primary ====
===== Candidates =====
====== Declared ======
- Mark Small, lawyer and candidate for Indiana's 5th congressional district in 2020

===== Results =====
Republican primary
Party	Candidate	Votes	%
Republican	Mark Small	Unopposed	100.0
Total votes			100.0

==== Democratic primary ====
===== Candidates =====
====== Declared ======
- Ed DeLaney, incumbent state representative

===== Results =====
Democratic primary
Party	Candidate	Votes	%
Democratic	Ed DeLaney (incumbent)	Unopposed	100.0
Total votes			100.0

==== General election ====
===== Results =====
General election
Party	Candidate	Votes	%	±%
Democratic	Ed DeLaney (incumbent)	19,191	71.3	
Republican	Mark Small	7,709	28.7	
Total votes		26,900	100.0	
Democratic hold				

=== District 87 ===
The district had been represented by Democrat Carey Hamilton since 2016. Hamilton was re-elected with 62.7% of the vote in 2020.

==== Republican primary ====
===== Candidates =====
====== Declared ======
- Jordan Davis

===== Results =====
Republican primary
Party	Candidate	Votes	%
Republican	Jordan Davis	Unopposed	100.0
Total votes			100.0

==== Democratic primary ====
===== Candidates =====
====== Declared ======
- Carey Hamilton, incumbent state representative

===== Results =====
Democratic primary
Party	Candidate	Votes	%
Democratic	Carey Hamilton (incumbent)	Unopposed	100.0
Total votes			100.0

==== General election ====
===== Results =====
General election
Party	Candidate	Votes	%	±%
Democratic	Carey Hamilton (incumbent)	15,477	62.9	
Republican	Jordan Davis	9,124	37.1	
Total votes		24,601	100.0	
Democratic hold				

=== District 88 ===
The district had been represented by Republican Chris Jeter since 2020. Jeter was re-elected with 59.3% of the vote in 2020.

==== Republican primary ====
===== Candidates =====
====== Declared ======
- Chris Jeter, incumbent state representative
- Chrystal Sisson

===== Results =====
Republican primary
Party	Candidate	Votes	%
Republican	Chris Jeter (incumbent)	3,642	74.9
Republican	Chrystal Sisson	1,218	25.1
Total votes		4,860	100.0

==== Democratic primary ====
===== Candidates =====
====== Declared ======
- Donna Griffin
- Craig Hirsty

===== Results =====
Democratic primary
Party	Candidate	Votes	%
Democratic	Donna Griffin	1,467	88.4
Democratic	Craig Hirsty	192	11.6
Total votes		1,659	100.0

==== General election ====
===== Results =====
General election
Party	Candidate	Votes	%	±%
Republican	Chris Jeter (incumbent)	14,707	59.9	
Democratic	Donna Griffin	9,866	40.1	
Total votes		24,573	100.0	
Republican hold				

=== District 89 ===
The district had been represented by Democrat Mitch Gore since 2020. Gore was first elected with 51.3% of the vote in 2020.

==== Republican primary ====
===== Candidates =====
====== Declared ======
- Michael-Paul Hart, Indianapolis City-County Council member for the 18th district

===== Results =====
Republican primary
Party	Candidate	Votes	%
Republican	Michael-Paul Hart	Unopposed	100
Total votes			100.0

==== Democratic primary ====
===== Candidates =====
====== Declared ======
- Mitch Gore, incumbent state representative

===== Results =====
Democratic primary
Party	Candidate	Votes	%
Democratic	Mitch Gore (incumbent)	Unopposed	100
Total votes			100.0

==== General election ====
===== Results =====
General election
Party	Candidate	Votes	%	±%
Democratic	Mitch Gore (incumbent)	6,960	51.0	
Republican	Michael-Paul Hart	6,695	49.0	
Total votes		13,655	100.0	
Democratic hold				

=== District 90 ===
The district had been represented by Republican Mike Speedy since 2010. Speedy was re-elected with 63.9% of the vote in 2020.

==== Republican primary ====
===== Candidates =====
====== Declared ======
- Mike Speedy, incumbent state representative
- David Waters

===== Results =====
Republican primary
Party	Candidate	Votes	%
Republican	Mike Speedy (incumbent)	4,318	82.0
Republican	David Waters	945	18.0
Total votes		5,263	100.0

==== Socialism and Liberation ====
===== Candidates =====
====== Declared ======
- Noah Leininger

==== General election ====
===== Results =====
General election
Party	Candidate	Votes	%	±%
Republican	Mike Speedy (incumbent)	13,610	98.1	
Socialism and Liberation	Noah Leininger (write-in)	259	1.9	
Total votes		13,869	100.0	
Republican hold				

=== District 91 ===
The district had been represented by Republican Robert Behning since 1992. Behning was re-elected with 59.5% of the vote in 2020.

==== Republican primary ====
===== Candidates =====
====== Declared ======
- Robert Behning, incumbent state representative
- David Hewitt

===== Results =====
Republican primary
Party	Candidate	Votes	%
Republican	Robert Behning (incumbent)	1,906	61.8
Republican	David Hewitt	1,178	38.2
Total votes		3,084	100.0

==== General election ====
===== Results =====
General election
Party	Candidate	Votes	%	±%
Republican	Robert Behning (incumbent)	Unopposed	100.0	
Total votes		9,556	100.0	
Republican hold				

=== District 92 ===
The district had been represented by Democrat Renee Pack since 2020. Pack was first elected unopposed in 2020.

==== Republican primary ====
===== Candidates =====
====== Declared ======
- John Couch, candidate for this district in 2014 and for Indiana's 7th congressional district in 2018

===== Results =====
Republican primary
Party	Candidate	Votes	%
Republican	John Couch	Unopposed	100
Total votes			100.0

==== Democratic primary ====
===== Candidates =====
====== Declared ======
- Renee Pack, incumbent state representative

===== Results =====
Democratic primary
Party	Candidate	Votes	%
Democratic	Renee Pack (incumbent)	Unopposed	100
Total votes			100.0

==== General election ====
===== Results =====
General election
Party	Candidate	Votes	%	±%
Democratic	Renee Pack (incumbent)	7,824	56.0	
Republican	John Couch	6,135	44.0	
Total votes		13,959	100.0	
Democratic hold				

=== District 93 ===
The district had been represented by Republican John Jacob since 2020. Jacob was first elected with 61% of the vote in 2020.

==== Republican primary ====
===== Candidates =====
====== Declared ======
- John Jacob, incumbent state representative
- Julie McGuire

===== Results =====
Republican primary
Party	Candidate	Votes	%
Republican	Julie McGuire	2,291	61.1
Republican	John Jacob (incumbent)	1,461	38.9
Total votes		3,752	100.0

==== Democratic primary ====
===== Candidates =====
====== Declared ======
- Andy Miller, electrician and candidate for this district in 2020

===== Results =====
Democratic primary
Party	Candidate	Votes	%
Democratic	Andy Miller	Unopposed	100
Total votes			100.0

==== General election ====
===== Results =====
General election
Party	Candidate	Votes	%	±%
Republican	Julie McGuire	7,959	57.7	
Democratic	Andy Miller	4,965	36.0	
Independent	Karl Knable	875	6.3	
Total votes		13,799	100.0	
Republican hold				

=== District 94 ===
The district had been represented by Democrat Cherrish Pryor since 2008. Pryor was re-elected with 85.5% of the vote in 2020.

==== Democratic primary ====
===== Candidates =====
====== Declared ======
- Cherrish Pryor, incumbent state representative

===== Results =====
Democratic primary
Party	Candidate	Votes	%
Democratic	Cherrish Pryor (incumbent)	Unopposed	100
Total votes			100.0

==== General election ====
===== Results =====
General election
Party	Candidate	Votes	%	±%
Democratic	Cherrish Pryor (incumbent)	Unopposed	100.0	
Total votes		11,206	100.0	
Democratic hold				

=== District 95 ===
The district had been represented by Democrat John Bartlett since 2008. Bartlett was re-elected unopposed in 2020.

==== Democratic primary ====
===== Candidates =====
====== Declared ======
- John Bartlett, incumbent state representative

===== Results =====
Democratic primary
Party	Candidate	Votes	%
Democratic	John Bartlett (incumbent)	Unopposed	100
Total votes			100.0

==== General election ====
===== Results =====
General election
Party	Candidate	Votes	%	±%
Democratic	John Bartlett (incumbent)	Unopposed	100.0	
Total votes		10,597	100.0	
Democratic hold				

=== District 96 ===
The district had been represented by Democrat Greg Porter since 1992. Porter was first re-elected unopposed in 2020.

==== Democratic primary ====
===== Candidates =====
====== Declared ======
- Greg Porter, incumbent state representative

===== Results =====
Democratic primary
Party	Candidate	Votes	%
Democratic	Greg Porter (incumbent)	Unopposed	100
Total votes			100.0

==== General election ====
===== Results =====
General election
Party	Candidate	Votes	%	±%
Democratic	Greg Porter (incumbent)	Unopposed	100.0	
Total votes		17,468	100.0	
Democratic hold				

=== District 97 ===
The district had been represented by Democrat Justin Moed since 2012. Moed was re-elected with 55.5% of the vote in 2020.

==== Republican primary ====
===== Candidates =====
====== Declared ======
- John Schmitz, construction company owner, candidate for mayor of Indianapolis in 2019 and for this district in 2020

===== Results =====
Republican primary
Party	Candidate	Votes	%
Republican	John Schmitz	Unopposed	100
Total votes			100.0

==== Democratic primary ====
===== Candidates =====
====== Declared ======
- Justin Moed, incumbent state representative

==== Libertarian convention ====
===== Candidates =====
====== Declared ======
- Edgar Villegas

===== Results =====
Democratic primary
Party	Candidate	Votes	%
Democratic	Justin Moed (incumbent)	Unopposed	100.0
Total votes			100.0

==== General election ====
===== Results =====
General election
Party	Candidate	Votes	%	±%
Democratic	Justin Moed (incumbent)	5,103	58.8	
Republican	John Schmitz	3,333	38.4	
Libertarian	Edgar Villegas	238	2.7	
Total votes		8,642	100.0	
Democratic hold				

=== District 98 ===
The district had been represented by Democrat Robin Shackleford since 2012. Shackleford was re-elected unopposed in 2020.

==== Democratic primary ====
===== Candidates =====
====== Declared ======
- Robin Shackleford, incumbent state representative

===== Results =====
Democratic primary
Party	Candidate	Votes	%
Democratic	Robin Shackleford (incumbent)	Unopposed	100
Total votes			100.0

==== General election ====
===== Results =====
General election
Party	Candidate	Votes	%	±%
Democratic	Robin Shackleford (incumbent)	Unopposed	100.0	
Total votes		8,359	100.0	
Democratic hold				

=== District 99 ===
The district had been represented by Democrat Vanessa Summers since her appointment in 1991. Summers was re-elected unopposed in 2020.

==== Republican primary ====
===== Candidates =====
====== Declared ======
- Felipe Rios, minister, candidate for mayor of Indianapolis in 2019 and for the 97th district in 2020

===== Results =====
Republican primary
Party	Candidate	Votes	%
Republican	Felipe Rios	Unopposed	100
Total votes			100.0

==== Democratic primary ====
===== Candidates =====
====== Declared ======
- Vanessa Summers, incumbent state representative

===== Results =====
Democratic primary
Party	Candidate	Votes	%
Democratic	Vanessa Summers (incumbent)	Unopposed	100
Total votes			100.0

==== General election ====
===== Results =====
General election
Party	Candidate	Votes	%	±%
Democratic	Vanessa Summers (incumbent)	8,539	82.6	
Republican	Felipe Rios	1,800	17.4	
Total votes		10,339	100.0	
Democratic hold				

=== District 100 ===
The district had been represented by Democrat Blake Johnson since his appointment 2020. Johnson was re-elected with 67% of the vote in 2020.

==== Democratic primary ====
===== Candidates =====
====== Declared ======
- Blake Johnson, incumbent state representative

===== Results =====
Democratic primary
Party	Candidate	Votes	%
Democratic	Blake Johnson (incumbent)	Unopposed	100
Total votes			100.0

==== General election ====
===== Results =====
General election
Party	Candidate	Votes	%	±%
Democratic	Blake Johnson (incumbent)	Unopposed	100.0	
Total votes		11,558	100.0	
Democratic hold				
