= Kubacki =

Kubacki (feminine Kubacka) is a Polish surname. Notable people with the surname include:

- Dawid Kubacki (born 1990), Polish ski jumper
- Rafał Kubacki (born 1967), Polish judoka
- Rebecca Kubacki, American politician
