= Charles Mosley =

Charles Mosley may refer to:

- Charles Mosley (coach) (1888–1968), American football, basketball, and baseball player and coach
- Charles Mosley (genealogist) (1948–2013), British author and editor of genealogies
- Chuck Mosley (1959–2017), American singer-songwriter

== See also ==
- Charles Moseley, Indiana politician
- Charles Mozley, British artist
