= Robert Cherry =

Robert Cherry may refer to:

- Robert D. Cherry, professor emeritus in the Department of Economics at Brooklyn College
- R. Gregg Cherry (1891–1957), Democratic governor of North Carolina, 1945–1949
- Bobby Frank Cherry (1930–2004), murderer
- Bob Cherry (politician) (born 1947), member of the Indiana House of Representatives
- Bob Cherry, a fictional character, see Greyfriars School
