= Kyle Pierce (politician) =

American politician

Member of the Indiana House of Representatives from the 36th district
- In office November 22, 2022 – November 4, 2026
- Preceded by: Terri Austin
- Succeeded by: Kimberly Townsend

Personal details
- Born: Anderson, Indiana, U.S.
- Party: Republican
- Education: Ball State University (BS); Indiana University (JD)

Kyle Pierce is an American politician who formerly served as a member of the Indiana House of Representatives from the 36th district. He assumed office on November 22, 2022.

== Career ==
Pierce earned a bachelor's degree from Ball State University in political science and a Juris Doctor from Indiana University. Pierce defeated Terri Austin, who was seeking her eleventh term, in the 2022 Indiana House of Representatives election. He defeated Thonja Nicholson in the 2024 general election by 59-41%. He was one of 15 Republican state representatives to lose reelection in 2026, being defeated by Democrat Kimberly Townsend by a margin of 55-45%.

Pierce serves as the vice chair of the Financial Institutions committee, and serves on the Elections and Apportionment committee and Environmental Affairs committee.

== Electoral history ==
2022 Indiana House of Representatives election
Party	Candidate	Votes	%	±%
Republican	Kyle Pierce	8,904	50.9	
Democratic	Terri Austin (incumbent)	8,581	49.1	
Total votes		17,485	100.0	
Republican gain from Democratic				

2024 Indiana House of Representatives election
Party	Candidate	Votes	%	±%
Republican	Kyle Pierce (incumbent)	15,310	59.00	+8.1%
Democratic	Thonja Nicholson	10,623	41.0	−8.1%
Total votes		25,933	100.0	
