= Greg Simms =

American politician

Member of the Indiana House of Representatives from the 10th district
- In office October 27, 2007 – November 5, 2008
- Preceded by: Jack Clem
- Succeeded by: Charles Moseley

Personal details
- Party: Democratic
- Spouse: Pam
- Profession: Educator / Council Member

Greg Simms is a former Democratic member of the Indiana House of Representatives, he represented the 10th District from 2007 to 2008. Valparaiso, Indiana. Simms was elected to the Porter County Council District 3 seat in November 2018. Simms retired from teaching at Washington Township High School in the Fall of 2023 after several years of teaching US History and Government. Simms also has a radio show on WVLP 103.1 FM Valparaiso, Indiana. He also has a promotional business: Simms Enterprises Inc.
