= Carey Hamilton =

American politician from Indiana

Chair of the Indiana House Democratic Caucus
- Incumbent
- Assumed office November 8, 2022
- Preceded by: Terri Austin

Member of the Indiana House of Representatives from the 87th district
- Incumbent
- Assumed office November 22, 2016
- Preceded by: Christina Hale

Personal details
- Born: 1971 or 1972 (age 53–54)
- Party: Democratic

Carey Hamilton (born 1971/1972) is an American politician who has served in the Indiana House of Representatives from the 87th district since 2016.

== Personal life ==
Hamilton has a degree from Indiana University Bloomington. She is married to Derek Hamilton and has two children.

== Electoral history ==
Indiana State House District 87 election, 2016
Party	Candidate	Votes	%	±%
Democratic	Carey Hamilton	17,485	52.25%	+0.75%
Republican	Connie Eckert	15,982	47.75%	−0.75%
Total votes		33,467	100.00%	

Indiana State House District 87 election, 2018
Party	Candidate	Votes	%	±%
Democratic	Carey Hamilton (incumbent)	18,650	62.2%	+9.95%
Republican	Paula Finch	11,338	37.8%	−9.95%
Total votes		29,988	100.00%	

Indiana State House District 87 election, 2020
Party	Candidate	Votes	%	±%
Democratic	Carey Hamilton (incumbent)	22,729	62.7%	+0.5%
Republican	Ryan Royer	13,549	37.3%	−0.5%
Total votes		36,278	100.00%	

Indiana State House District 87 election, 2022
Party	Candidate	Votes	%	±%
Democratic	Carey Hamilton (incumbent)	15,477	62.9%	+0.2%
Republican	Jordan Davis	9,124	37.1%	−0.2%
Total votes		24,601	100.00%	

Indiana State House District 87 election, 2024
Party	Candidate	Votes	%	±%
Democratic	Carey Hamilton (incumbent)	25,517	100.0%	+37.1%
Total votes		25,517	100.00%	
