= Dave Hall (Indiana politician) =

American politician

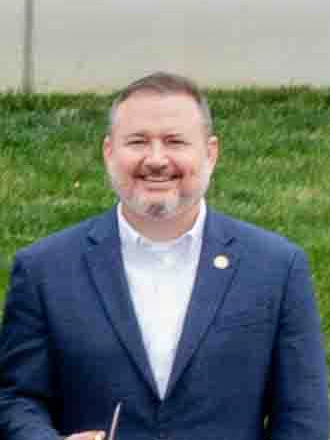

Member of the Indiana House of Representatives from the 62nd district
- In office November 22, 2022 – November 4, 2026
- Preceded by: Jeff Ellington
- Succeeded by: Amy Huffman Oliver

Personal details
- Party: Republican

Dave Hall is an American politician who formerly served as a member of the Indiana House of Representatives from the 62nd district. He is a member of the Republican Party.

== Career ==
Hall's political career began as a Jackson County council member. Hall faced Penny Githens, a Democrat, in the 2022 Indiana House of Representatives election. The election was very tight with the original tally being 12,975 votes to 12,938 in Hall's favor (a difference of 37 votes or 0.1%). A recount took place and showed that Hall retained his victory and increased his vote tally to 13,037 votes compared to Githens' 12,963 (a difference of 74 votes or 0.3%). Seventeen paper ballots were lost between the initial count and the recount, but were counted based on their scans in the initial count.

Hall lost reelection to Democrat Amy Huffman Oliver in the November 3, 2026 general election.

== Personal life ==
Hall lives in Norman with his wife, Bradie. They have three daughters Hayden and Sydney, who are twins, and Gabby. They are members of Restoration Church of the Nazarene in Bedford.

== Electoral history ==
2022 Indiana House of Representatives election, District 62 Republican Primary
Party	Candidate	Votes	%	±%
Republican	Dave Hall	2,896	56.7	
Republican	Greg Knott	2,212	43.3	
Total votes		5,108	100.0	

2022 Indiana House of Representatives election, District 62
Party	Candidate	Votes	%	±%
Republican	Dave Hall	13,037	50.1	
Democratic	Penny Githens	12,963	49.9	
Total votes		26,000	100.0	
Republican hold				

2024 Indiana House of Representatives election, District 62 Republican Primary
Party	Candidate	Votes	%	±%
Republican	Dave Hall	5,513	100.0	
Total votes		5,513	100.0	

2024 Indiana House of Representatives election, District 62
Party	Candidate	Votes	%	±%
Republican	Dave Hall	18,395	51.1	
Democratic	Thomas Horrocks	17,586	48.9	
Total votes		35,981	100.0	
Republican hold				
