= Curt Nisly =

American politician from Indiana

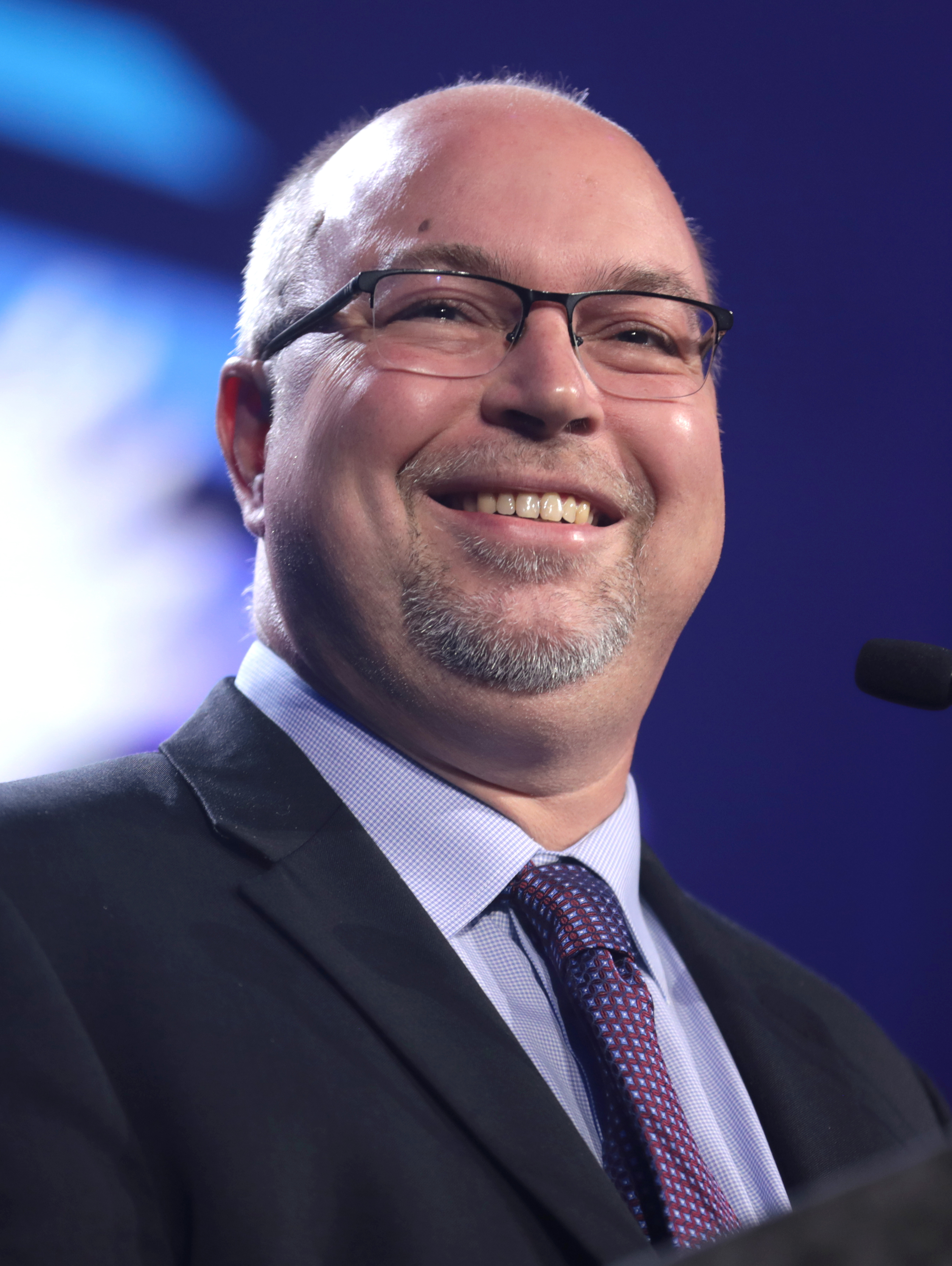
- Nisly in 2022

Member of the Indiana House of Representatives from the 22nd district
- In office November 18, 2014 – November 22, 2022
- Preceded by: Rebecca Kubacki
- Succeeded by: Craig Snow

Personal details
- Born: June 11, 1972 (age 54) Goshen, Indiana, U.S.
- Party: Republican
- Spouse: Mary
- Children: 4

Curt Nisly (born June 11, 1972) is an American politician who served in the Indiana House of Representatives from the 22nd district from 2014 until 2022.

== Early life ==
Nisly was born in Goshen, Indiana.

== Career ==
From 1998 to 2005, Nisly worked as a design engineer for Honeyville Metal. He later co-founded C-Tech Solutions, a company that provides sheet metal product development and consulting services.

Nisly was elected to the Indiana House of Representatives in 2014. In the 2022 Republican primary for re-election to the 22nd district, Nisly was defeated by Craig Snow. In August 2022, Nisly declared his candidacy for the 2022 Indiana's 2nd congressional district special election.

== Personal life ==
Nisly and his wife, Mary, have four children. Mary is a registered nurse who worked as chair of the Elkhart County Republican Party.
