= David Wolkins =

American politician

Member of the Indiana House of Representatives from the 18th district
- In office 1988 – November 4, 2020
- Preceded by: Thames L. Mauzy
- Succeeded by: Craig Snow

Personal details
- Born: June 2, 1943 (age 83) Warsaw, Indiana
- Party: Republican
- Spouse: Candace
- Education: Greenville College; Saint Francis College
- Occupation: Politician

David Alan Wolkins (born June 2, 1943) is a Republican member of the Indiana House of Representatives, representing the 18th District since 1988. He has consistently supported legislation that would raise Indiana's speed limit. Wolkins is a member of the American Legislative Exchange Council (ALEC), serving as Indiana State Chair.
