= Jeff Thompson (Indiana politician) =

American politician from Indiana

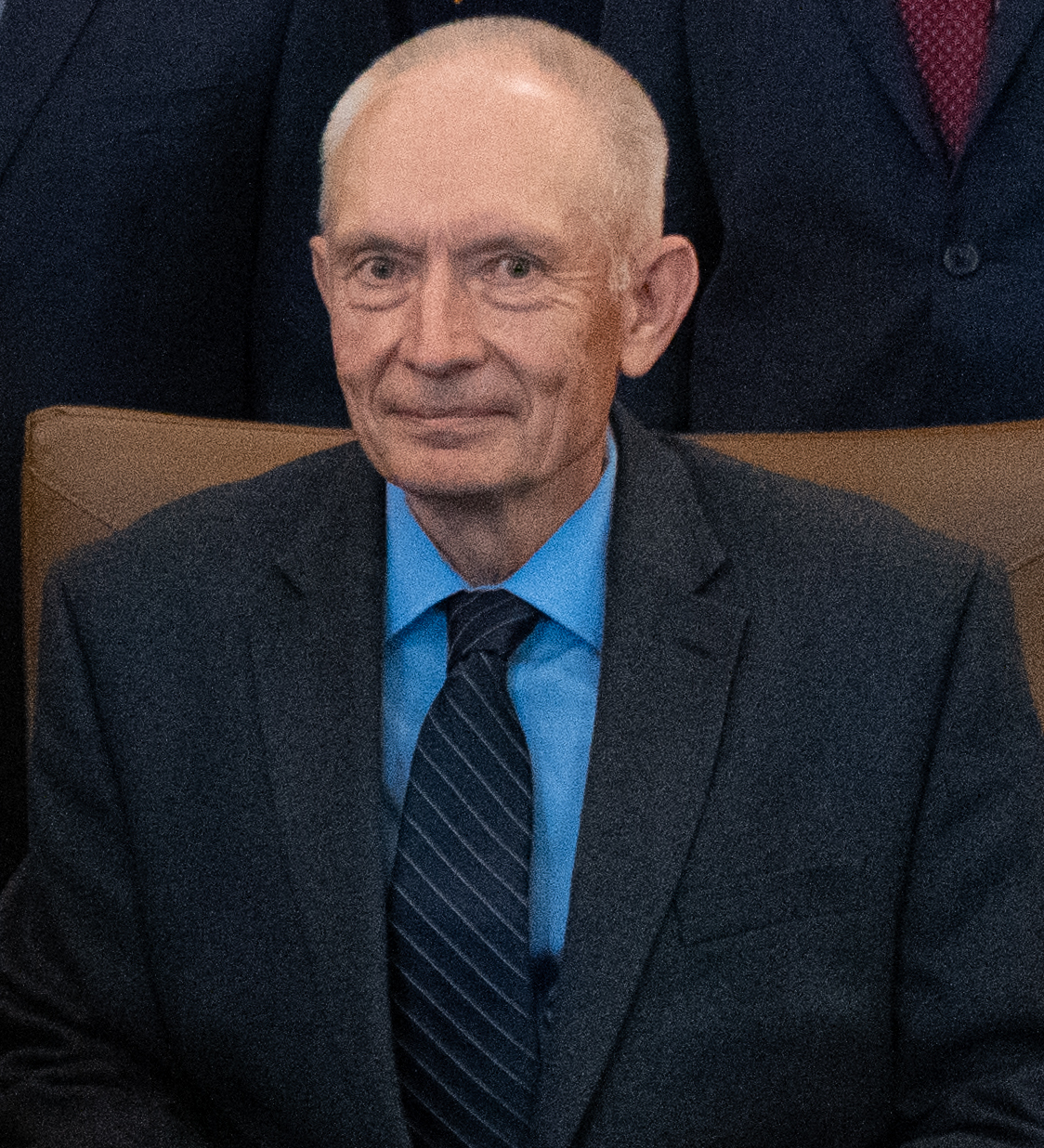

Member of the Indiana House of Representatives from the 28th district
- Incumbent
- Assumed office 1998
- Preceded by: James Davis

Personal details
- Party: Republican
- Spouse: Michelle
- Children: 6
- Education: Purdue University
- Occupation: Politician

Jeffrey A. Thompson is a Republican member of the Indiana House of Representatives, representing the 28th District since 1998. He attempted to amend three different measures in the Indiana House to include a ban on specialty plates for an Indiana Youth Group license plate in 2012. He previously served on the Indiana State Fair Board from 1991 to 1998 and as its president from 1995 to 1998.
