= Cindy Ledbetter =

American politician and a psychiatric nurse practitioner

Member of the Indiana House of Representatives from the 75th district
- Incumbent
- Assumed office November 4, 2020
- Preceded by: Ronald Bacon

Personal details
- Born: Cindy Evans
- Party: Republican
- Children: 2
- Education: Ivy Tech Community College of Indiana (ASN); University of Southern Indiana (BSN, MSN)Doctorate of Nursing Practice, DNP

Cindy Ledbetter is an American politician and psychiatric nurse practitioner serving as a member of the Indiana House of Representatives from the 75th district. She assumed office on November 4, 2020.

== Education ==
Ledbetter earned an associate degree from Ivy Tech Community College of Indiana, followed by a Bachelor of Science in Nursing a Master of Science in Nursing from the University of Southern Indiana and a Doctorate of Nursing Practice from the University of Southern Indiana.

== Career ==
Cindy, a psychiatric nurse practitioner has over 34 years of medical, business, and administrative experience. She has managed both for-profit and not-for-profit organizations, has worked in retail management, and has had ownership of a small manufacturing firm and a restaurant. She also served as a member of the Warrick County Council. Ledbetter was elected to the Indiana House of Representatives in November 2020.
