= Edmond Soliday =

American politician

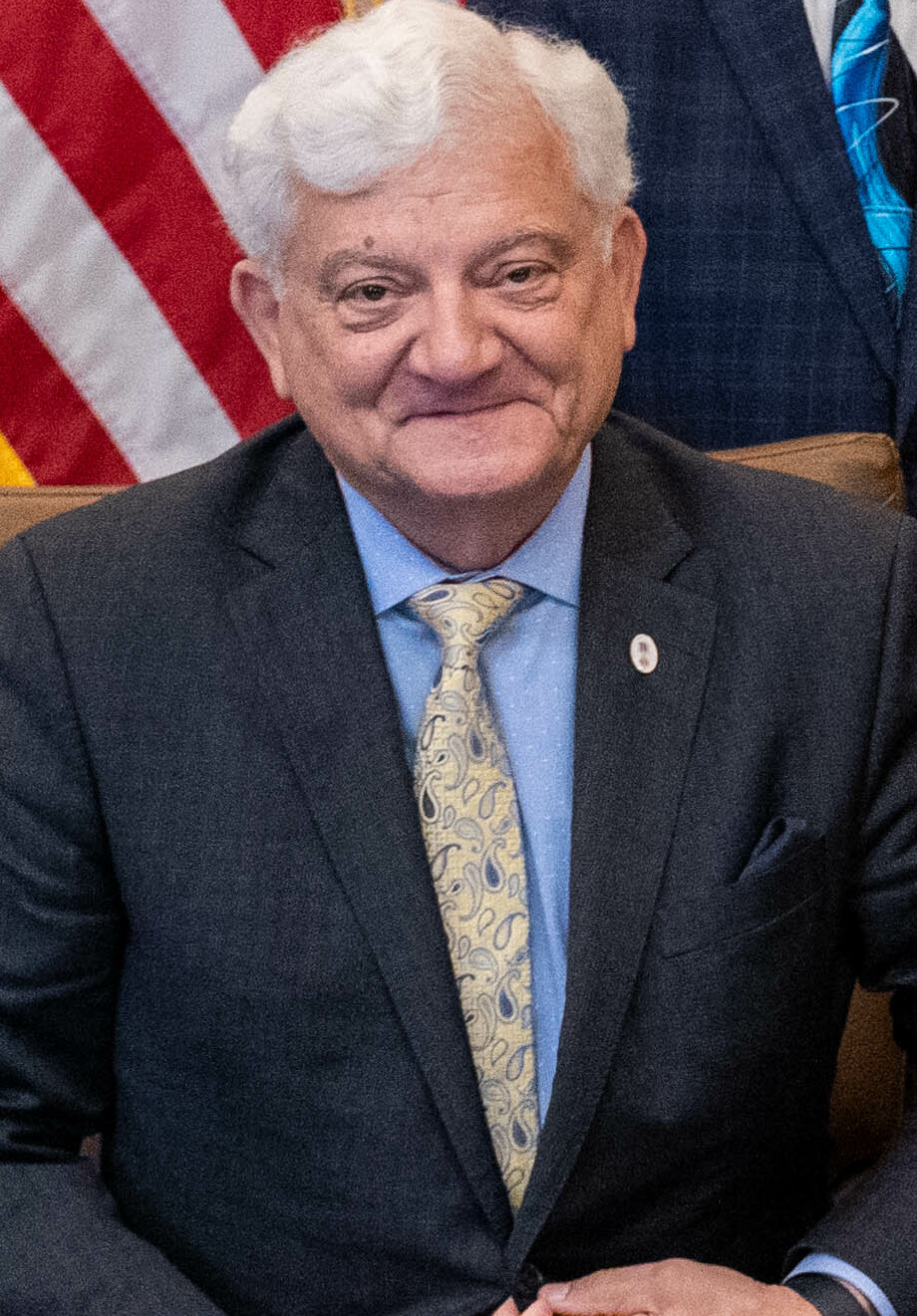

Member of the Indiana House of Representatives from the 4th district
- In office November 8, 2006 – November 3, 2026
- Preceded by: Ralph Donald Ayres

Personal details
- Born: April 3, 1945 (age 81) Valparaiso, Indiana, U.S.
- Party: Republican
- Spouse: Mary
- Education: Indiana University Bloomington
- Occupation: Politician

Edmond L. Soliday (born April 3, 1945) is a Republican member of the Indiana House of Representatives, representing the 4th District.

== Early life and education ==
Soliday graduated from Valparaiso High School in 1963 and Indiana University Bloomington.

== Career ==
He served in the United States Army from 1968 to 1970 where he became a warrant officer and flew helicopters in Vietnam during the Vietnam War. He became a captain at United Airlines where he worked for 35 years as a pilot and an executive.

=== Tenure as State Representative ===
In 2025, Soliday texted the mayor of Portage, Austin Bonta, saying he will "work hard to make sure your city never gets any revenue increases!!!", after Bonta expressing support for elected members to be included on the Indiana Utility Regulatory Commission. Soliday accused the mayor of making it harder for Northern Indiana Public Service Co (NIPSCO) to provide pay increases to its employees and to maintain its infrastructure. He said in a statement that his text to the mayor was "offhand and not intended literally."

Soliday lost his reelection to Democrat Ryan Kominakis in the November 3, 2026 general election.
