= Robert Morris (Indiana politician) =

American politician

Bob Morris
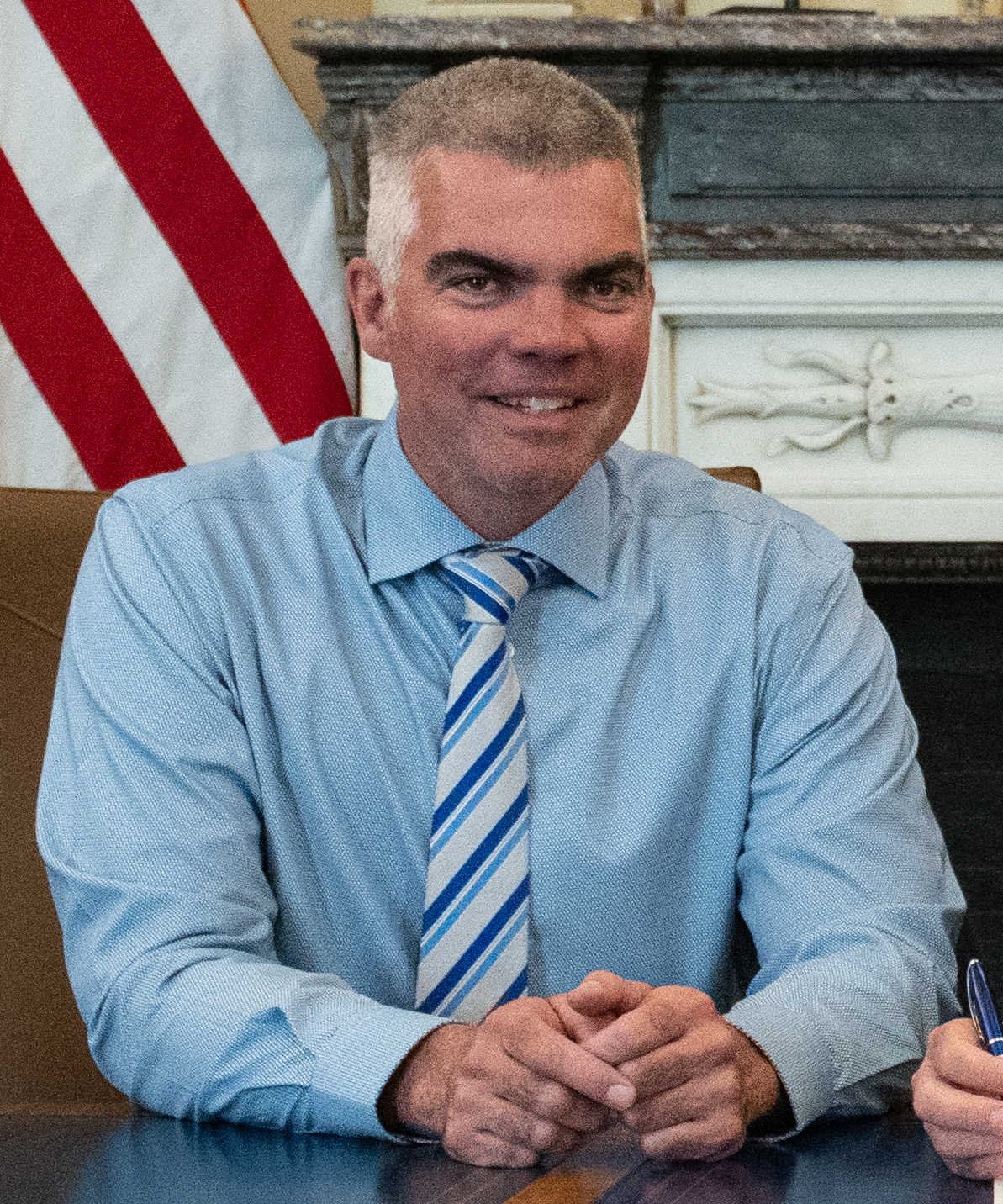

Member of the Indiana House of Representatives from the 84th district
- In office November 3, 2010 – November 3, 2026

Personal details
- Born: Robert Morris Streator, Illinois, U.S.
- Party: Republican
- Spouse: Erin
- Children: 7
- Education: Indiana University; Bloomington (BS)

Robert "Bob" Morris is an American politician serving as a member of the Indiana House of Representatives from the 84th district. He assumed office on November 3, 2010.

== Early life and education ==
Morris was born in Streator, Illinois and moved to Fort Wayne, Indiana in 1976. He attended the Saint Charles Borromeo School and graduated from Bishop Dwenger High School. Morris earned a Bachelor of Science degree from the Indiana University Bloomington.

== Career ==
Morris owns Healthkick Nutrition Centers. In 2005 and 2006, he served as an officer in the New Haven, Indiana Police Department. He was also president of Georgetown Merchant Association. Morris was elected to the Indiana House of Representatives in November 2010. Ahead of the 2022 general election, he was one of several Republican politicians and media personalities spreading the litter boxes in schools hoax.

Morris lost his reelection to Democrat Misti Meehan in the November 3, 2026 general election.
