= Donna Schaibley =

American politician from Indiana

Member of the Indiana House of Representatives from the 24th district
- In office December 23, 2014 – November 18, 2024
- Preceded by: Steve Braun
- Succeeded by: Hunter Smith

Personal details
- Born: November 15, 1953 (age 72) Floyds Knobs, Indiana, U.S.
- Party: Republican

Donna Schaibley (born November 15, 1953) is an American politician who served in the Indiana House of Representatives from the 24th district from 2014 to 2024.
