= John Bartlett (Indiana politician) =

American politician from Indiana

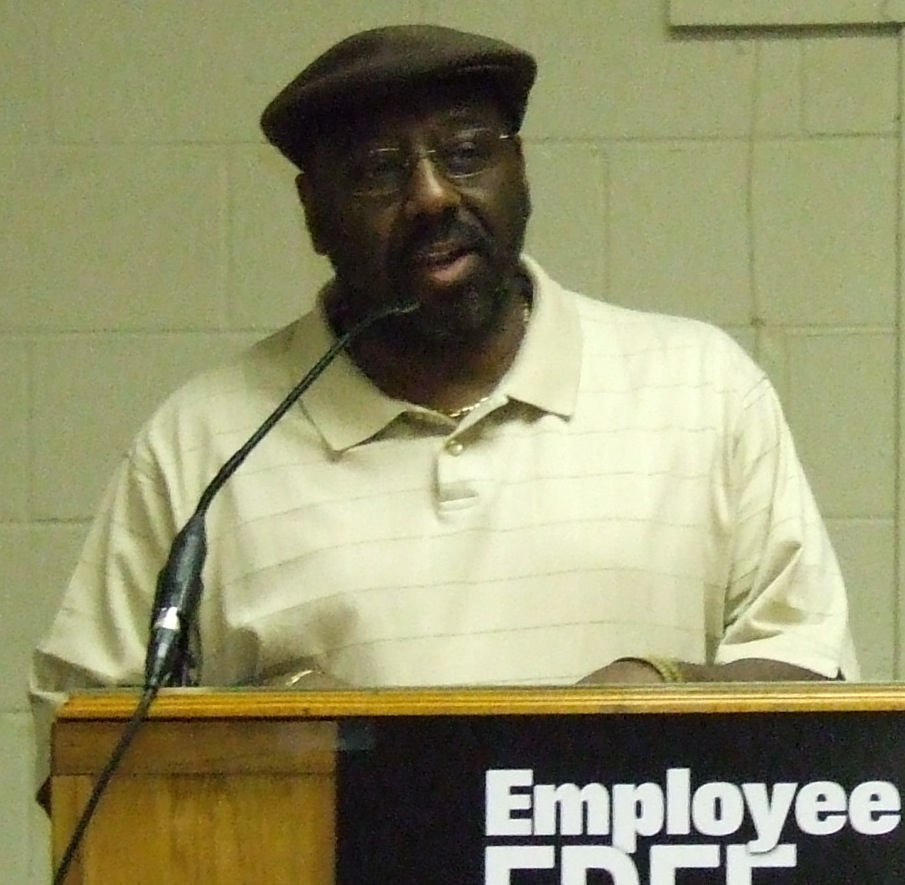
- Bartlett in 2009

Member of the Indiana House of Representatives from the 95th district
- Incumbent
- Assumed office December 17, 2007
- Preceded by: Mae Dickinson

Personal details
- Born: 1948 or 1949 (age 76–77)
- Party: Democratic
- Spouse: Lillie
- Education: Martin University

John L. Bartlett (born 1948/1949) is a Democratic member of the Indiana House of Representatives, representing the 95th District since 2007.

In 2015, at age 66, Barrlett earned a bachelor's degree from Martin University.
