= Elizabeth Rowray =

American politician

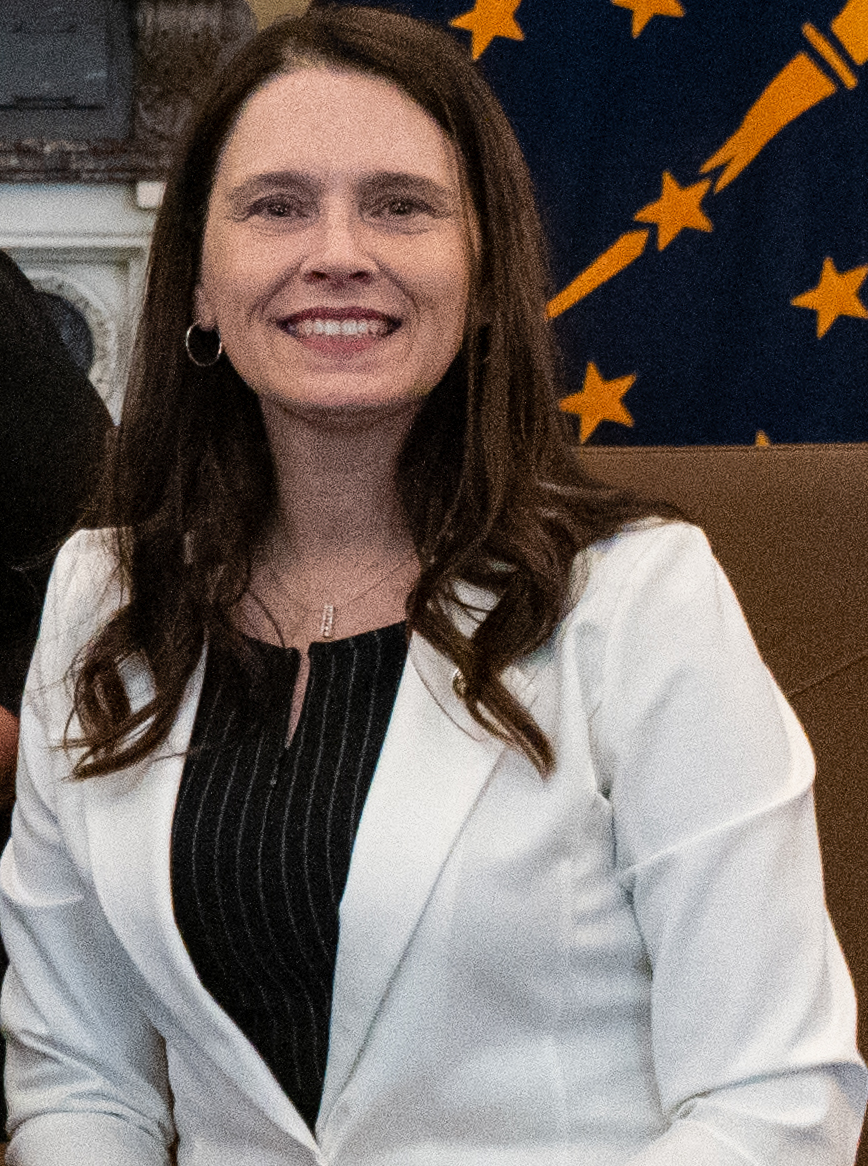

Member of the Indiana House of Representatives from the 35th district
- Incumbent
- Assumed office November 4, 2020
- Preceded by: Melanie Wright

Personal details
- Born: Delaware County, Indiana, U.S.
- Party: Republican
- Children: 3
- Education: Ball State University (BA)

Elizabeth Rowray is an American politician serving as a member of the Indiana House of Representatives from the 35th district. She assumed office on November 4, 2020.

== Early life and education ==
Born and raised in Delaware County, Indiana, Rowray graduated from Muncie Burris High School. She earned a Bachelor of Arts degree in English from Ball State University.

== Career ==
Rowray served as the legislative director for Congressman Mark Souder. She later worked for the Muncie-Delaware County Economic Development Alliance. Rowray was elected to the Indiana House of Representatives in November 2020, defeating incumbent Democrat Melanie Wright. She is also a consultant in the non-profit sector.
