= Carolyn Jackson =

American politician

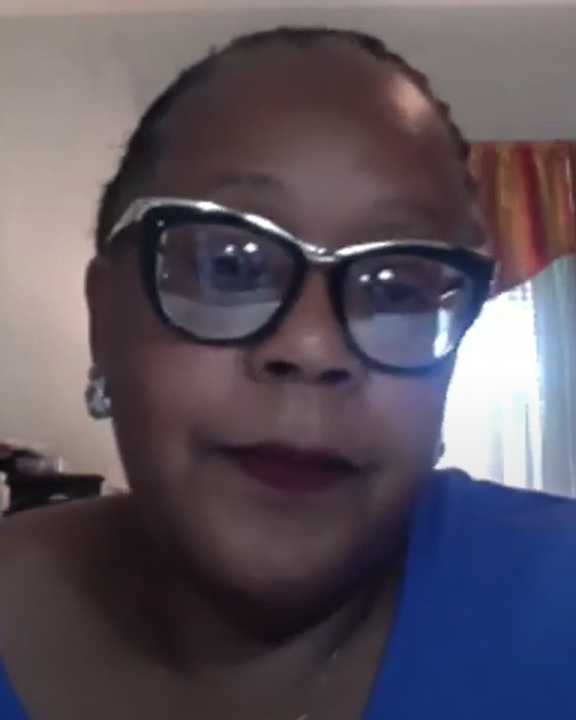
- Jackson in 2020

Member of the Indiana House of Representatives from the 1st district
- Incumbent
- Assumed office November 7, 2018
- Preceded by: Linda Lawson

Personal details
- Born: Chicago, Illinois, U.S.
- Political party: Democratic
- Education: Lincoln University (BA, MA)

Carolyn B. Jackson is an American politician and retired counselor serving as a member of the Indiana House of Representatives from the 1st district. She assumed office on November 7, 2018.

== Early life and education ==
Jackson was born and raised on the South Side of Chicago, Illinois. She earned a Bachelor of Arts degree in sociology and Master of Arts in counseling from Lincoln University in St. Louis.

== Career ==
Jackson worked for the Cole County Juvenile Attention Center during her master's degree program. She then worked as a sociologist and counselor for the Cook County Adult Probation Department for 30 years before retiring. She was elected to the Indiana House of Representatives in November 2018. During the 2019–2020 legislative session, Jackson served as ranking minority member of the House Select Committee on Government Reduction.
