= Greg Porter =

American politician from Indiana

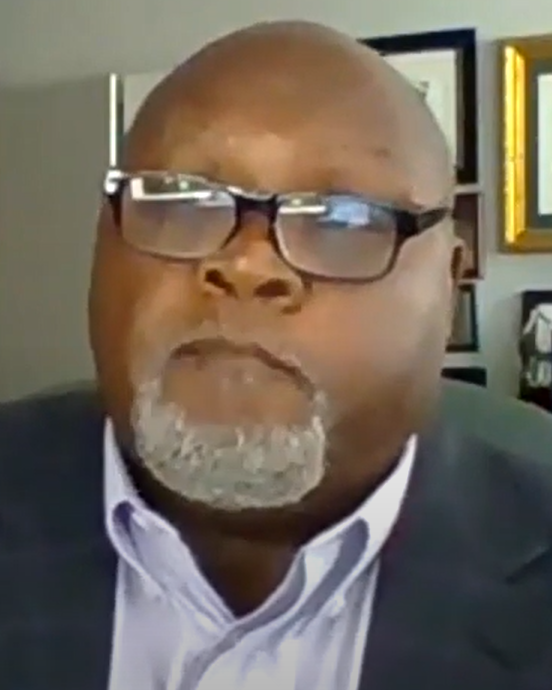
- Porter in 2020

Member of the Indiana House of Representatives from the 96th district
- Incumbent
- Assumed office November 4, 1992
- Preceded by: Constituency established

Personal details
- Born: May 14, 1955 (age 71) Indianapolis, Indiana
- Party: Democratic
- Spouse: Yvette
- Education: Earlham College (BA); Harvard University
- Occupation: Hospital administration

Greg Porter is a Democratic member of the Indiana House of Representatives, representing the 96th District since 1992. He is a member of the Indiana Black Legislative Caucus.
