= Blake Johnson =

American politician

Member of the Indiana House of Representatives from the 100th district
- Incumbent
- Assumed office July 10, 2020
- Preceded by: Dan Forestal

Member of the Indianapolis City-County Council from the 12th district
- In office January 1, 2016 – July 10, 2020
- Preceded by: Michael McQuillen
- Succeeded by: Jason Larrison

Personal details
- Born: Robert Blake Johnson
- Party: Democratic
- Education: Eckerd College (BA); Marian University (MA)

Robert Blake Johnson is an American politician serving as a member of the Indiana House of Representatives from the 100th district. He was appointed to the House on July 10, 2020.

== Early life and education ==
Johnson earned a Bachelor of Arts degree in political science and communications from Eckerd College and a Master of Arts in teaching from Marian University.

== Career ==
In 2009 and 2010, Johnson worked as a communications advisor and speechwriter for Sue Errington's successful state senate campaign. From 2009 to 2011, he worked as a teacher with Teach For America. In 2011, he was the director of communications for the Marion County Democratic Party. From 2011 to 2013, he served as communications director and senior advisor for Congressman André Carson. He joined Complete College America in 2013, working as the organization's communications director until 2017 and vice president of strategy until 2018. He represented the 12th district on the Indianapolis City-County Council from 2016 to 2020. He is the interim CEO of The Parks Alliance of Indianapolis. Johnson was appointed to the Indiana House of Representatives in July 2020. He also serves as ranking member of the House Local Government Committee.

== Electoral history ==
Indianapolis City-County Council District 12, 2015
Party	Candidate	Votes	%	
Democratic	Blake Johnson	3,298	59.6%	New District
Republican	Susan Marie Smith	1,909	34.5%	New District
Libertarian	Michael Gunyon	324	5.9%	New District
Total votes		5,531	100.00%	

Indianapolis City-County Council District 12, 2019
Party	Candidate	Votes	%	±%
Democratic	Blake Johnson (incumbent)	4,050	72.5%	+12.9%
Republican	Jerry Mahshie	1,338	24.0%	−10.5%
Libertarian	Justin Harter	195	3.5%	−2.4%
Total votes		5,583	100.00%	

Indiana State House District 100 Democratic primary election, 2020
Party	Candidate	Votes	%
Democratic	Blake Johnson	4,677	74.7%
Democratic	Clif Marsiglio	1,585	25.3%
Total votes		6,262	100.00%

Indiana State House District 100 election, 2020
Party	Candidate	Votes	%	±%
Democratic	Blake Johnson (incumbent)	16,353	67.0%	−33.0%
Republican	Wayne Harmon	8,037	33.0%	+33.0%
Total votes		24,390	100.00%	

Indiana State House District 100 election, 2022
Party	Candidate	Votes	%	±%
Democratic	Blake Johnson (incumbent)	11,558	100.0%	+33.0%
Total votes		11,558	100.00	

Indiana State House District 100 election, 2024
Party	Candidate	Votes	%	±%
Democratic	Blake Johnson (incumbent)	16,653	71.7%	−28.3%
Republican	Joseph Bortka	6,577	28.3%	+28.3%
Total votes		23,230	100.00	
