= Christopher May =

American politician from Indiana

Chris May

Member of the Indiana House of Representatives from the 65th district
- Incumbent
- Assumed office November 9, 2016
- Preceded by: Eric Koch

Personal details
- Born: Christopher May Oolitic, Indiana, U.S.
- Party: Republican
- Spouse: Amanda May
- Children: 2
- Education: Vincennes University (BS)

Christopher D. "Chris" May is an American politician serving as a member of the Indiana House of Representatives from the 65th district. He assumed office on November 9, 2016.

== Early life and education ==
Born and raised in Oolitic, Indiana, May graduated from Bedford North Lawrence High School. He earned a Bachelor of Science degree in industrial and product design from Vincennes University in 1995.

== Career ==
Prior to entering politics, May worked in design and engineering positions at Ford Motor Company, Cook Group, General Motors, Otis Worldwide, and Whitney Tool Company. He later founded Hoosier Tech Properties. May also served as a member of the Lawrence County Board of Commissioners for three terms. He was elected to the Indiana House of Representatives in November 2016. Since 2019, he has served as vice chair of the House Local Government Committee.
