= Sheila Klinker =

American educator and politician from Indiana

Member of the Indiana House of Representatives from the 27th district
- Incumbent
- Assumed office November 3, 1982
- Preceded by: Richard Olin Regnier

Personal details
- Born: December 20, 1938 (age 87) Indianapolis, Indiana, U.S.
- Party: Democratic
- Spouse: Victor Klinker (m. 1962; died 2024)
- Education: Purdue University (B.Ed., MS)
- Occupation: Educator, politician

Sheila Ann Klinker (born December 20, 1938) is a Democratic politician who is currently a member of the Indiana House of Representatives, representing House District 27 since 1982.

Born in Indianapolis, Indiana, Klinker graduated from Purdue University with her Bachelor of Education in elementary education in 1961. Klinker later received her Master of Science from Purdue in 1970. Klinker worked her entire teaching career for the Lafayette School Corporation. She began her teaching career in 1961 at Klondike Elementary School in West Lafayette, Indiana while also teaching at Edgelea Elementary School. In 1963, Klinker began teaching at Miami Elementary School in Lafayette, Indiana, until 1985. Klinker was also the outreach liaison at the Purdue University College of Education.

Klinker currently serves on the House Committees for Agriculture and Rural Development, Education, and Ways and Means.
