= Rebecca Kubacki =

American politician

Member of the Indiana House of Representatives from the 22nd district
- In office November 3, 2010 – November 5, 2014
- Preceded by: William J. Ruppell
- Succeeded by: Curt Nisly

Personal details
- Born: Rebecca (née Espinoza) Kubacki Immokalee, Florida
- Party: Republican
- Spouse: Michael
- Education: Indiana University
- Occupation: Politician

Rebecca Kubacki is an American politician and former Republican member of the Indiana House of Representatives. Kubacki represented the 22nd District for two terms from 2010 to 2014.

== Early life and education ==
Born to parents Christina and Raul Espinoza, Kubacki was born in a migrant workers camp in Immokalee, Florida. Kubacki, who is the middle child of her parents' seven children, grew up in Texas before her parents found work as tomato farmers and settled in Oswego, Indiana when she was young. She graduated from Pierceton High School in Pierceton, Indiana, where she met her future husband, Michael Kubacki. She went on to attend Indiana University's Kelley School of Business.

== Indiana House of Representatives ==
In 2010, Kubacki launched a primary challenge to nine-term Republican incumbent William Rupple and defeated him 53.8% to 46.1%. In the general election, Kubacki faced Democratic opponent Allen Lee Dunnagan and won with 66% of the vote. Kubacki was sworn in on November 16, 2010, and became the first Hispanic Republican to serve in the Indiana House. She was subsequently elected to a second term after defeating Kosciusko County Democratic Party Treasurer John Bonitati with over 75% of the vote. In the 2014 Republican primary Kubacki was challenged by business owner Curt Nisly, who attacked her primarily on her position against amending the Indiana Constitution to define "marriage." On May 6, 2014, Kubacki lost to Nisly 2,541 votes to 4,624, or 35.2% to 64.7%. Throughout the entire campaign, Kubacki stood strong in her position that proposed legislation should be for the betterment of the State and did not give in to the pressures of interest groups within her party.

== Personal life ==
Kubacki lives with her husband Michael in Carmel, Indiana, they have two adult children, Katherine “Katie” Kitson (Teacher in Warsaw) mother to Isabella "Isa" Silva and Roman Silva and Matthew Kubacki (Deputy Prosecuting Attorney in Indianapolis) father to Grayson Kubacki. Michael is the Chairman of Lakeland Financial Corp in Warsaw, Indiana and is a former member of the board of directors at the Federal Reserve Bank of Chicago. Kubacki is a practicing Roman Catholic and attends St Martin De Porres Parish in Syracuse.
