= Renee Pack =

American politician (born 1962)

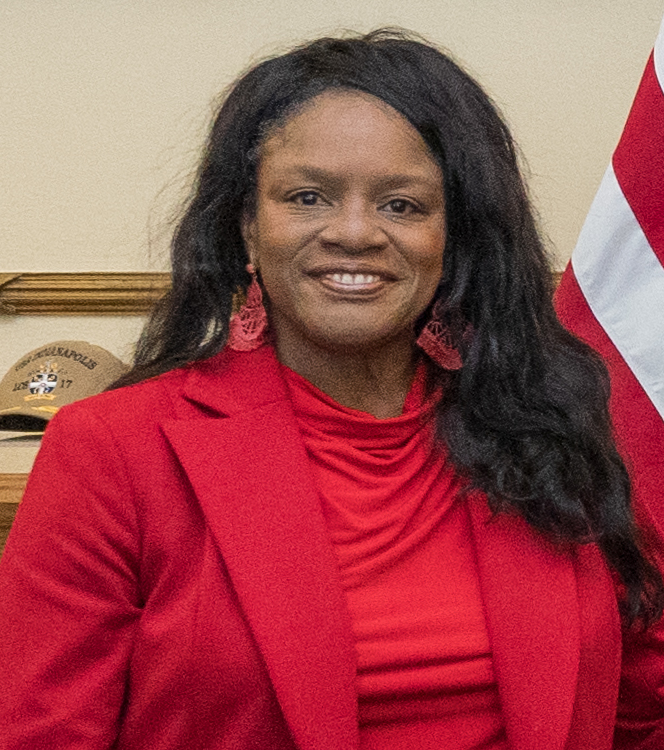

Member of the Indiana House of Representatives from the 92nd district
- Incumbent
- Assumed office November 4, 2020
- Preceded by: Karlee Macer

Personal details
- Born: June 14, 1962 (age 64) Nashville, Tennessee, U.S.
- Party: Democratic
- Spouse: Sean Pack Sr.
- Children: 4
- Education: Indiana Wesleyan University (BBA); Indiana University–Purdue University Indianapolis (MA)

Military service
- Branch/service: United States Army
- Years of service: 1986–1991

Renee Pack (born June 14, 1962) is an American politician serving as a member of the Indiana House of Representatives from the 92nd district. She assumed office on November 4, 2020.

== Early life and education ==
Pack was born in Nashville, Tennessee and graduated from Whites Creek High School. She earned a Bachelor of Business Administration from Indiana Wesleyan University and a Master of Arts in educational leadership from Indiana University–Purdue University Indianapolis.

== Career ==
Pack served in the United States Army from 1986 to 1991. Since 2005, she has worked as a community liaison for the Metropolitan School District of Wayne Township. She also worked as a behavioral specialist and drug and alcohol counselor. She was elected to the Indiana House of Representatives in November 2020. She is the ranking member of the House Veterans Affairs and Public Safety Committee.
