= Craig Snow =

American politician

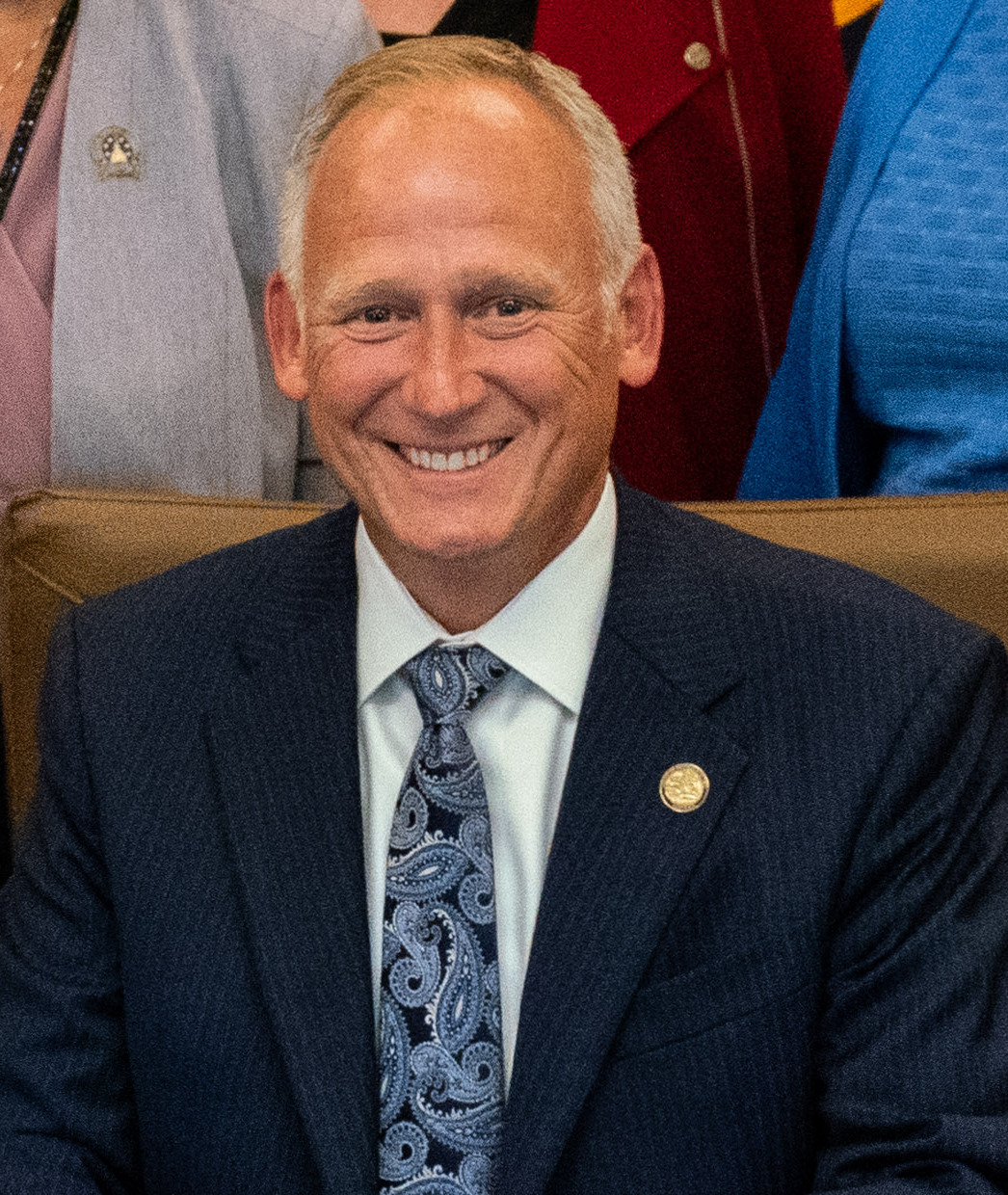

Member of the Indiana House of Representatives from the 22nd district
- Incumbent
- Assumed office November 23, 2022
- Preceded by: Curt Nisly

Member of the Indiana House of Representatives from the 18th district
- In office November 4, 2020 – November 22, 2022
- Preceded by: David Wolkins
- Succeeded by: David Abbott

Personal details
- Party: Republican
- Education: Grace College & Seminary

Craig Snow is an American politician. He serves as a Republican member for the 22nd district of the Indiana House of Representatives.

Snow attended Warsaw Community High School and Grace College & Seminary, where he earned a Bachelor of Science in business administration. In 2020, Snow was elected for the 18th district of the Indiana House of Representatives. He succeeded David Wolkins. Snow assumed his office on November 4, 2020.
