= David Abbott (Indiana politician) =

American politician

Member of the Indiana House of Representatives
- Incumbent
- Assumed office November 23, 2022
- Preceded by: Craig Snow
- In office May 2, 2018 – November 22, 2022
- Preceded by: David Ober
- Succeeded by: Kyle Miller
- Constituency: 18th district (2022–present); 82nd district (2018–2022)

Personal details
- Born: Fort Wayne, Indiana, U.S.
- Party: Republican
- Children: 5
- Education: Indiana University

David H. Abbott is an American politician serving as a member of the Indiana House of Representatives from the 18th district. He assumed office on May 2, 2018.

== Early life and education ==
Abbott was born and raised in Fort Wayne, Indiana. After graduating from Elmhurst High School, he attended Indiana University Bloomington.

== Career ==
Abbott served as a member of the Rome City Town Council for 27 years and the Noble County Board of Commissioners for three years. From 2007 to 2017, he was a design engineer at Luttman Precision Mold. Abbott was appointed to the Indiana House of Representatives in April 2018 and assumed office in May. Abbott also serves as vice chair of the House Natural Resources Committee.
