= Shane Lindauer =

American chiropractor and politician from Indiana

Member of the Indiana House of Representatives from the 63rd district
- Incumbent
- Assumed office November 1, 2017
- Preceded by: Mike Braun

Personal details
- Party: Republican
- Spouse: Stacy
- Children: 2
- Education: Indiana State University (BS); Logan College of Chiropractic

Shane Lindauer is an American chiropractor, businessman, and politician from the state of Indiana. He represents the 63rd district in the Indiana House of Representatives.

Lindauer graduated from Jasper High School in Jasper, Indiana, in 1992. He earned a Bachelor of Science from Indiana State University and graduated from the Logan College of Chiropractic in 2004. He served in the Indiana Army National Guard and Missouri Army National Guard from 1997 through 2005.

Lindauer worked as a chiropractor and became a small business owner. He won an election to the Dubois County Council in 2010. He served on the County Council until 2014.

Following Mike Braun's resignation from the Indiana House to run for the United States Senate, Lindauer was appointed to the seat to fill the remainder of the term, effective November 1, 2017.

Lindauer and his wife, Stacy, have two children and live in Jasper.
