= Terri Austin =

American educator and politician from Indiana

Member of the Indiana House of Representatives from the 36th district
- In office January 2003 – November 2022
- Preceded by: L. Jack Lutz
- Succeeded by: Kyle Pierce

Personal details
- Born: May 17, 1955 (age 71) Elwood, Indiana, U.S.
- Party: Democratic
- Spouse: Michael
- Education: Ball State University (BS); Butler University
- Occupation: Educator, politician

Terri Jo Austin is an American educator and politician from Indiana. Austin is a Democratic member of the Indiana House of Representatives, and last represented the 36th District from January 2003 to November 2022.

== Early life ==
On May 17, 1955, Austin was born in Elwood, Indiana.

== Education ==
In 1977, Austin earned a Bachelor of Science degree in Elementary Education from Ball State University. In 1981, Austin earned a MAE degree in Elementary Education from Ball State University. In 1996, Austin earned an Educational Administration and Supervision Certificate from Butler University.

== Career ==
In 1983, Austin became a teacher and Administrator at Anderson Community School Corporation in Indiana, until 2001.

On November 5, 2002, Austin won the election and became a Democratic member of Indiana House of Representatives for District 36. Austin defeated Andy Kincaid with 52.18% of the votes.

In 2003, Austin became an adjunct professor at Anderson University's School of Education.

On November 2, 2004, as an incumbent, Austin won the election and continued serving District 36. Austin defeated Ronald B. Carrell with 62.04% of the votes. On November 7, 2006, as an incumbent, Austin won the election and continued serving District 36. Austin defeated Francie Pyburn Metzger with 63.43% of the votes. On November 4, 2008, as an incumbent, Austin won the election and continued serving District 36. Austin defeated Frank Burrows and Greg Noland with 60.73% of the votes.

On November 6, 2018, as an incumbent, Austin won the election and continued serving District 36. Austin defeated Jennifer Culp with 55.41% of the votes.

== Awards ==
- 2004 Legislator of the Year. Presented by Indiana Chiropractors Association.
- 2005 Legislator of the Year. Presented by Indiana Petroleum and Convenience Store Association.
- 2006 Guardian of Small Business. Presented by National Federation of Independent Business (NFIB).
- 2007 Legislator of the Year. Presented by Indiana Trial Lawyers Association.
- 2014 Torchbearer Award. Presented by Indiana Commission for Women (ICW). March 5, 2014.
- 2014 Athena award. Athena and Community Shining Star Awards Gala.
- 2019 Guardian of Small Business Award. Presented by National Federation of Independent Business (NFIB).

== Personal life ==
Austin's husband is Michael Austin. They have two children. Austin and her family live in Anderson, Indiana.
