= Charles Moseley =

American politician from Indiana

Chuck Moseley

Member of the Indiana House of Representatives from the 10th district
- Incumbent
- Assumed office January 2009
- Preceded by: Greg Simms

Personal details
- Party: Democratic
- Spouse: Monica
- Occupation: Public relations

Charles A. "Chuck" Moseley is a Democratic member of the Indiana House of Representatives, representing the 10th District since 2009.
