= Bob Cherry (politician) =

American politician (born 1947)

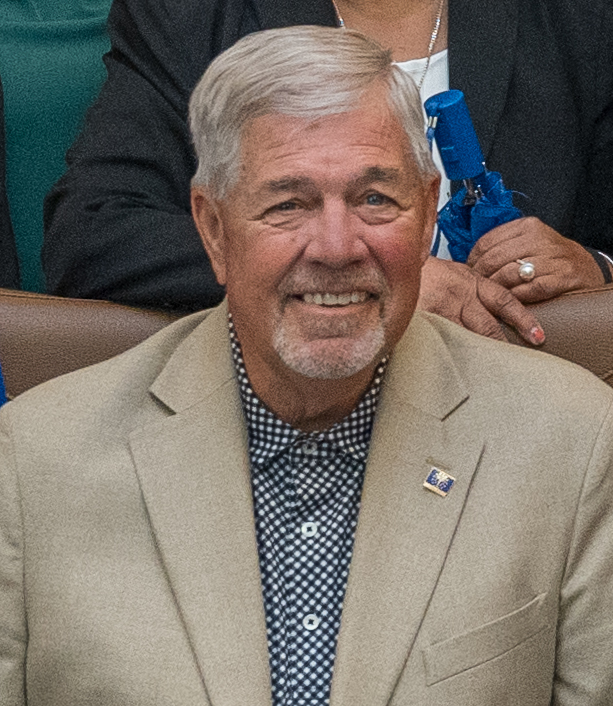

Member of the Indiana House of Representatives from the 53rd district
- In office November 4, 1998 – November 18, 2024
- Preceded by: Nick Gulling
- Succeeded by: Ethan Lawson

Personal details
- Born: October 22, 1947 (age 78) Shelbyville, Indiana
- Party: Republican
- Profession: Teacher

Robert W. Cherry (born October 22, 1947) is an American politician. He was a member of the Indiana House of Representatives from the 53rd District, serving from 1998 to 2024. He is a member of the Republican party. He previously served on the Hancock County Council from 1992 to 1996.

In November, 2023, Cherry announced he would not be seeking re-election in 2024.
