= 2020 United States House of Representatives elections in Indiana =

- November 3, 2020

All 9 Indiana seats to the United States House of Representatives
	Majority party	Minority party
Party	Republican	Democratic
Last election	7	2
Seats won	7	2
Seat change	Steady	Steady
Popular vote	1,738,744	1,194,901
Percentage	58.03%	39.88%
Swing	▲2.72%	▼4.45%

Republican
40–50%
50–60%
60–70%
70–80%
80–90%
Democratic
50–60%
60–70%

The 2020 United States House of Representatives elections in Indiana were held on November 3, 2020, to elect the nine U.S. representatives from the state of Indiana, one from each of the state's nine congressional districts. The elections coincided with the 2020 U.S. presidential election, as well as other elections to the House of Representatives, elections to the United States Senate and various state and local elections.

== Results ==
2020 United States House of Representatives general election in Indiana
Party	Votes	Percentage	% Change	Candidates	Seats before	Seats after	+/–
Republican	1,731,098	58.03%	▲2.72%	9	7	7	Steady
Democratic	1,194,901	39.88%	▼4.45%	9	2	2	Steady
Libertarian	62,798	2.10%	▲1.74%	5	0	0	Steady

District	Republican		Democratic		Others		Total		Result
District	Votes	%	Votes	%	Votes	%	Votes	%	Result
District 1	132,247	40.45%	185,180	56.64%	9,521	2.91%	326,948	100.0%	Democratic hold
District 2	183,601	61.49%	114,967	38.51%	0	0.00%	298,568	100.0%	Republican hold
District 3	220,989	67.84%	104,762	32.16%	0	0.00%	325,751	100.0%	Republican hold
District 4	225,531	66.62%	112,984	33.38%	0	0.00%	338,515	100.0%	Republican hold
District 5	208,212	50.02%	191,226	45.94%	16,788	4.03%	416,226	100.0%	Republican hold
District 6	225,318	68.65%	91,103	27.76%	11,791	3.59%	328,212	100.0%	Republican hold
District 7	106,146	37.56%	176,422	62.44%	0	0.00%	282,568	100.0%	Democratic hold
District 8	214,643	66.95%	95,691	29.85%	10,283	3.21%	320,617	100.0%	Republican hold
District 9	222,057	61.85%	122,566	34.14%	14,415	4.01%	359,038	100.0%	Republican hold
Total	1,738,744	58.03%	1,194,901	39.88%	62,798	2.10%	2,996,443	100.0%	

Popular vote
Republican	58.03%
Democratic	39.88%
Others	2.10%

House seats
Republican	77.78%
Democratic	22.22%

== District 1 ==
2020 Indiana's 1st congressional district election
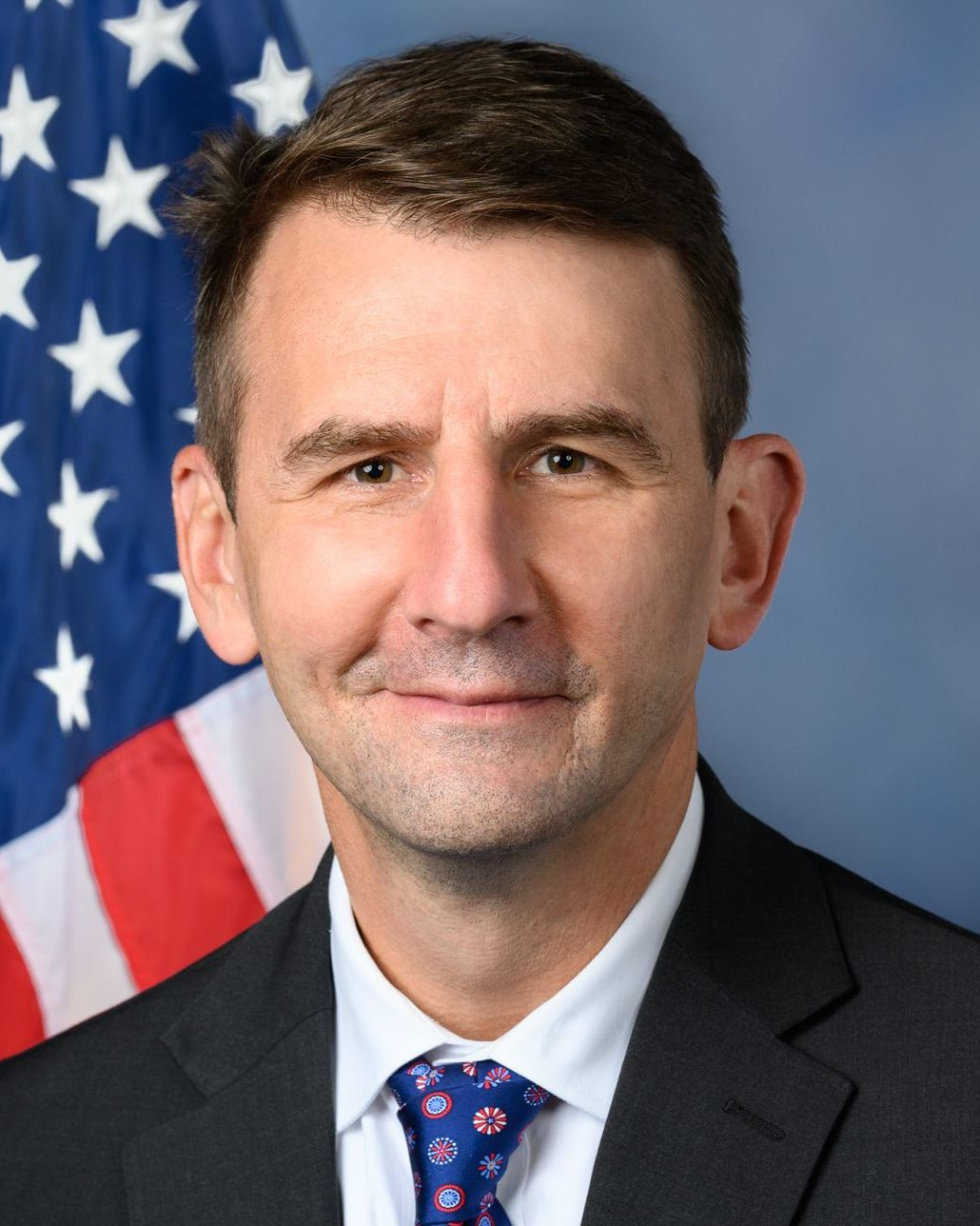

Nominee	Frank J. Mrvan	Mark Leyva
Party	Democratic	Republican
Popular vote	185,180	132,247
Percentage	56.6%	40.4%
- County results Mrvan: 50–60% 60–70% Leyva: 40–50%
U.S. Representative before election
Pete Visclosky
Democratic
Elected U.S. Representative
Frank J. Mrvan
Democratic

The 1st district encompasses Northwest Indiana, taking in the eastern Chicago metropolitan area, including Hammond and Gary, as well as Lake County, Porter County and western LaPorte County. The incumbent was Democrat Pete Visclosky, who was re-elected with 65.1% of the vote in 2018. On November 6, 2019, Visclosky announced he would retire and not run for re-election.

=== Democratic primary ===
==== Candidates ====
===== Nominee =====
- Frank J. Mrvan, North Township trustee and son of Frank Mrvan

===== Eliminated in primary =====
- Melissa Borom, former staffer to Pete Visclosky
- Carrie Castro, attorney
- Scott Costello, hospital behavioral health director
- Tony Daggett, U.S. Army veteran
- Ryan Farrar, former teacher
- Sabrina Haake, founder of the Gary Animal Welfare Coalition
- John Henry Hall, attorney and widower of former U.S. Representative Katie Hall
- Jim Harper, attorney and nominee for Indiana Secretary of State in 2018
- Thomas McDermott Jr., mayor of Hammond
- Wendell Mosby, former Prairie State Community College trustee
- Mara Candelaria Reardon, state representative
- Jayson Reeves, engineer
- Andrew Sylwestrowicz, former Merrillville town councilman

===== Declined =====
- Karen Freeman-Wilson, mayor of Gary
- Ragen Hatcher, state representative
- Eddie Melton, state senator
- Pete Visclosky, incumbent U.S. representative

==== Endorsements ====
Melissa Borom

U.S. representatives

- Jim Clyburn, House Majority Whip (2007–2011, 2019–2023) from SC-06 (1993–present)
- Marcia Fudge, OH-11 (2008–2021)
- Barbara Lee, CA-13 (1998–2025)
- Cedric Richmond, LA-02 (2011–2021)
- Bennie Thompson, MS-02 (1993–present)
- Frederica Wilson, FL-24 (2011–present)

Local officials

- Karen Freeman-Wilson, former mayor of Gary (2012–2019) and former attorney general of Indiana (2000–2001)
Sabrina Haake

U.S. representatives

- David Cicilline, RI-01 (2011–2023)
- Mark Takano, CA-41 (2013–present)
Jim Harper

Individuals

- Marianne Williamson, activist and Democratic candidate for president in 2020

Organizations

- Blue America
- Brand New Congress
- Democracy for America
- Indivisible Northwest Indiana
- Medicare for All PAC
- Our Michigan City
- Our Revolution
- Progressive Democrats of America
Thomas McDermott Jr.

U.S. senators

- Joe Donnelly, former Indiana (2013–2019)

U.S. representatives

- Seth Moulton, MA-06 (2015–2027)

Local officials

- Pete Buttigieg, former mayor of South Bend (2012–2020) and Democratic candidate for president in 2020

Organizations

- Indiana Chamber of Commerce
- VoteVets
Frank J. Mrvan

U.S. representatives

- Pete Visclosky, IN-01 (1985–2021)

Labor unions

- American Federation of Teachers Indiana
- United Steelworkers Local 6787
Mara Candelaria Reardon

U.S. representatives

- Chuy García, IL-04 (2019–present)
- Luis Gutiérrez, former IL-04 (1993–2019)
- Katie Hill, former CA-25 (2019)

Individuals

- Marie Newman, businesswoman and 2020 Democratic nominee for IL-03

Organizations

- Congressional Hispanic Caucus BOLD PAC

==== Primary results ====
Results by county Mrvan: 30–40%; McDermott: 20–30%; Harper: 20–30%

Results by precinct Mrvan: 20–30%; 30–40%; 40–50%; 50–60%; 60–70%; McDermott: 20–30%; 30–40%; 40–50%; 50–60%; 60–70%; Harper: 20–30%; 30–40%; 40–50%; 50–60%; 60–70%; Borom: 20–30%; 30–40%; 40–50%; Reardon: 20–30%; 30–40%; 40–50%; Haake: 30–40%; Tie: 20–30%; 30–40%; 40–50%

Democratic primary results
Party	Candidate	Votes	%
Democratic	Frank J. Mrvan	29,575	32.8
Democratic	Thomas McDermott Jr.	25,426	28.2
Democratic	Jim Harper	9,133	10.1
Democratic	Melissa Borom	7,792	8.7
Democratic	Mara Candelaria Reardon	6,997	7.8
Democratic	Sabrina Haake	4,365	4.8
Democratic	Carrie Castro	1,330	1.5
Democratic	John Hall	1,223	1.4
Democratic	Scott Costello	1,126	1.3
Democratic	Tony Daggett	965	1.1
Democratic	Wendell Mosby	893	1.0
Democratic	Jayson Reeves	526	0.6
Democratic	Andrew Sylwestrowicz	396	0.4
Democratic	Ryan Farrar	297	0.3
Total votes		90,044	100.0

=== Republican primary ===
==== Candidates ====
===== Nominee =====
- Mark Leyva, perennial candidate

===== Eliminated in primary =====
- Dion Bergeron, real estate broker
- Mont Handley, businessman
- Spencer Lemmons, police officer
- Bill Powers
- Delano Scaife, police officer

===== Declined =====
- Jon Costas, former mayor of Valparaiso
- Bill Hanna, CEO of Northwest Indiana Regional Development Authority

==== Primary results ====
Republican primary results
Party	Candidate	Votes	%
Republican	Mark Leyva	10,799	34.9
Republican	Bill Powers	7,073	22.9
Republican	Spencer Lemmons	4,748	15.4
Republican	Mont Handley	3,625	11.7
Republican	Dion Bergeron	3,127	10.1
Republican	Delano Scaife	1,552	5.0
Total votes		30,924	100.0

=== Libertarian primary ===
==== Candidates ====
===== Nominee =====
- Edward Strauss

=== General election ===
==== Predictions ====
Source	Ranking	As of
The Cook Political Report	Safe D	July 2, 2020
Inside Elections	Safe D	June 2, 2020
Sabato's Crystal Ball	Safe D	July 2, 2020
Politico	Likely D	April 19, 2020
Daily Kos	Safe D	June 3, 2020
RCP	Safe D	June 9, 2020
Niskanen	Safe D	June 7, 2020

==== Results ====
Indiana's 1st congressional district, 2020
Party	Candidate	Votes	%
Democratic	Frank J. Mrvan	185,180	56.6
Republican	Mark Leyva	132,247	40.4
Libertarian	Edward Michael Strauss	9,521	2.9
Total votes		326,948	100.0
Democratic hold			

== District 2 ==
2020 Indiana's 2nd congressional district election
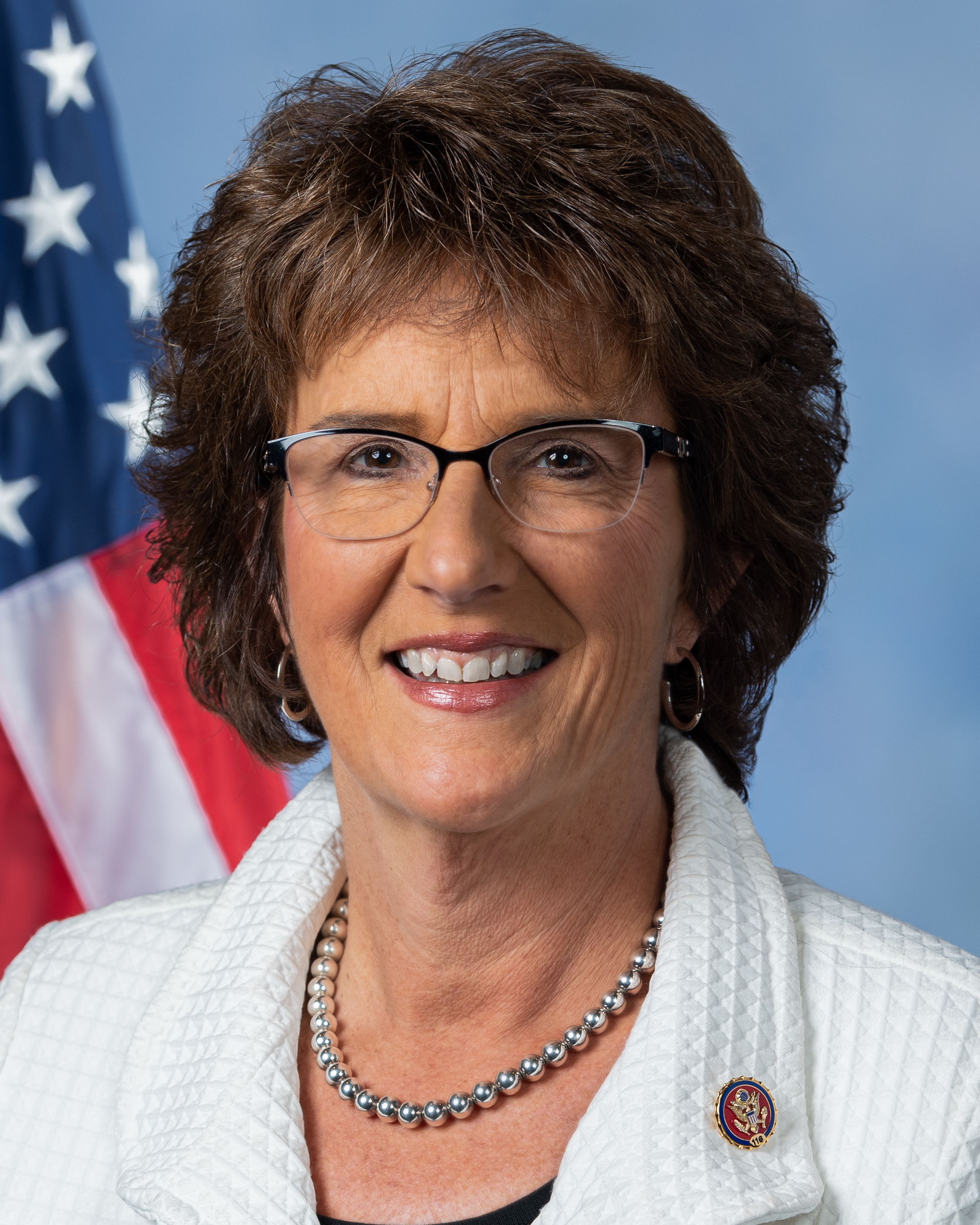

Nominee	Jackie Walorski	Pat Hackett
Party	Republican	Democratic
Popular vote	183,601	114,967
Percentage	61.5%	38.5%
- County results Walorski: 50–60% 60–70% 70–80% 80–90% Hackett: 50–60%
U.S. Representative before election
Jackie Walorski
Republican
Elected U.S. Representative
Jackie Walorski
Republican

The 2nd district is located in north central Indiana taking in Michiana including South Bend, Mishawaka, and Elkhart. The incumbent was Republican Jackie Walorski, who was re-elected with 54.8% of the vote in 2018.

=== Republican primary ===
==== Candidates ====
===== Nominee =====
- Jackie Walorski, incumbent U.S. Representative

===== Eliminated in primary =====
- Christopher Davis

==== Endorsements ====
Jackie Walorski

Organizations

- Maggie's List

==== Primary results ====
Republican primary results
Party	Candidate	Votes	%
Republican	Jackie Walorski (incumbent)	39,628	78.9
Republican	Christopher Davis	10,609	21.1
Total votes		50,237	100.0

=== Democratic primary ===
==== Candidates ====
===== Nominee =====
- Pat Hackett, attorney and candidate for Indiana's 2nd congressional district in 2018

===== Eliminated in primary =====
- Ellen Marks, attorney

===== Endorsements =====
Pat Hackett

Organizations

- LGBTQ Victory Fund

==== Primary results ====
Democratic primary results
Party	Candidate	Votes	%
Democratic	Patricia Hackett	32,708	77.8
Democratic	Ellen Marks	9,319	22.2
Total votes		42,027	100.0

=== General election ===
==== Predictions ====
Source	Ranking	As of
The Cook Political Report	Safe R	July 2, 2020
Inside Elections	Safe R	June 2, 2020
Sabato's Crystal Ball	Safe R	July 2, 2020
Politico	Likely R	April 19, 2020
Daily Kos	Safe R	June 3, 2020
RCP	Safe R	June 9, 2020
Niskanen	Safe R	June 7, 2020

==== Post-primary endorsements ====
Pat Hackett (D)

Vice Presidents

- Joe Biden, Vice President of the United States (2009 to 2017), Senator from Delaware (1973 to 2009) and Democratic Party nominee for President of the United States (2020)

Senators

- Joe Donnelly, Senator from Indiana (2013 to 2019) and Representative from Indiana (2007 to 2013)

Mayors

- Pete Buttigieg, Mayor of South Bend, Indiana (2012 to 2020) and Democratic Party candidate for President of the United States (2020)
- Allan Kauffman, Mayor of Goshen, Indiana (1986 to 2015)
- Steve Luecke, Mayor of South Bend, Indiana (1997 to 2012)
- James Mueller, Mayor of South Bend, Indiana (since 2020)

Individuals

- Cynthia Nixon, actress, activist and Democratic Party candidate for Governor of New York (2018)

Organizations

- Equality PAC
- End Citizens United
- Indiana State AFL-CIO
- Indiana Stonewall Democrats
- International Association of Bridge, Structural, Ornamental and Reinforcing Iron Workers
- International Brotherhood of Teamsters Local 364
- International Union of Operating Engineers Local 150
- Let America Vote
- LPAC
- National Education Association
- United Association Local 172
- United Steelworkers Local 12,775
Jackie Walorski (R)

Presidents

- Donald Trump, President of the United States (since 2017)

Organizations

- Indiana Farm Bureau
- National Federation of Independent Business
- National Right to Life Committee
- Right to Life Indiana

==== Results ====
Indiana's 2nd congressional district, 2020
Party	Candidate	Votes	%
Republican	Jackie Walorski (incumbent)	183,601	61.5
Democratic	Pat Hackett	114,967	38.5
Total votes		298,568	100.0
Republican hold			

== District 3 ==
2020 Indiana's 3rd congressional district election
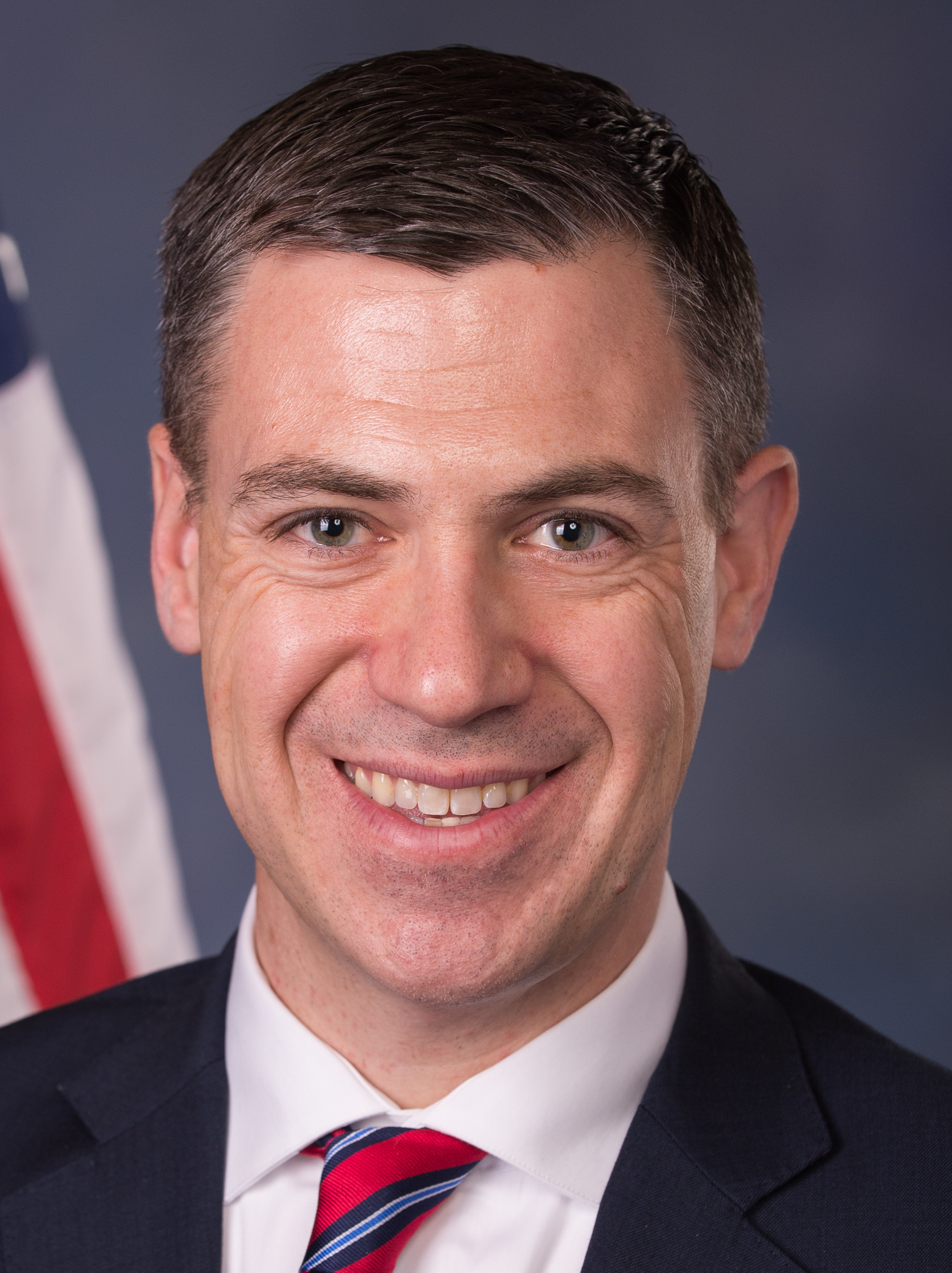

Nominee	Jim Banks	Chip Coldiron
Party	Republican	Democratic
Popular vote	220,989	104,762
Percentage	67.8%	32.2%
- County results Banks: 50–60% 70–80%
U.S. Representative before election
Jim Banks
Republican
Elected U.S. Representative
Jim Banks
Republican

The 3rd district is based in northeastern Indiana, taking in Fort Wayne and the surrounding areas. The incumbent was Republican Jim Banks, who was re-elected with 64.7% of the vote in 2018.

=== Republican primary ===
==== Candidates ====
===== Nominee =====
- Jim Banks, incumbent U.S. representative

===== Eliminated in primary =====
- Chris Magiera, physician

==== Primary results ====
Republican primary results
Party	Candidate	Votes	%
Republican	Jim Banks (incumbent)	64,574	85.2
Republican	Chris Magiera	11,200	14.8
Total votes		75,774	100.0

=== Democratic primary ===
==== Candidates ====
===== Nominee =====
- Chip Coldiron, teacher

===== Eliminated in primary =====
- Jean-Paul Kalonji, truck driver
- Carlos Marcano, tiling contractor
- Thomas Schrader, perennial candidate

==== Endorsements ====
Carlos Marcano

Organizations

- Rose Caucus

==== Primary results ====
Democratic primary results
Party	Candidate	Votes	%
Democratic	Chip Coldiron	13,545	38.9
Democratic	Carlos Marcano	10,759	30.9
Democratic	Thomas Schrader	5,570	16.0
Democratic	Jean-Paul Kalonji	4,954	14.2
Total votes		34,828	100.0

=== General election ===
==== Predictions ====
Source	Ranking	As of
The Cook Political Report	Safe R	July 2, 2020
Inside Elections	Safe R	June 2, 2020
Sabato's Crystal Ball	Safe R	July 2, 2020
Politico	Safe R	April 19, 2020
Daily Kos	Safe R	June 3, 2020
RCP	Safe R	June 9, 2020
Niskanen	Safe R	June 7, 2020

==== Results ====
Indiana's 3rd congressional district, 2020
Party	Candidate	Votes	%
Republican	Jim Banks (incumbent)	220,989	67.8
Democratic	Chip Coldiron	104,762	32.2
Total votes		325,751	100.0
Republican hold			

== District 4 ==
2020 Indiana's 4th congressional district election
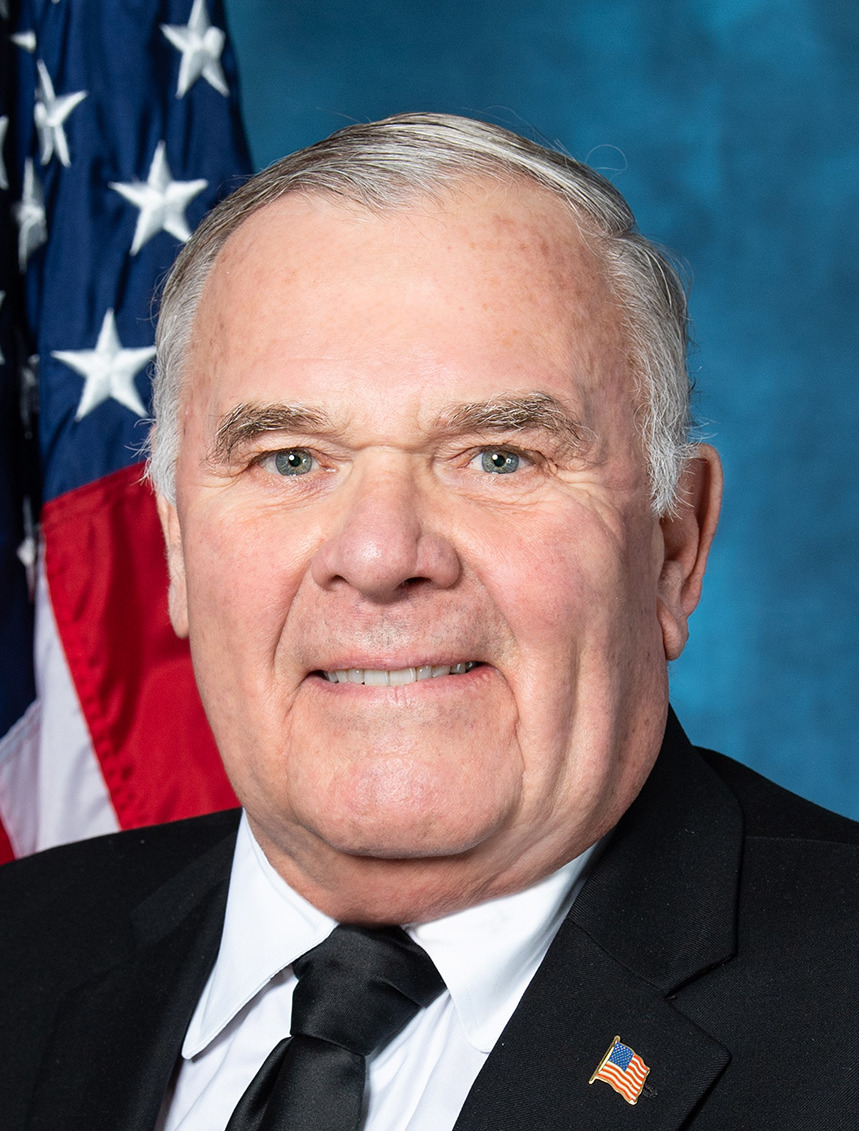

Nominee	Jim Baird	Joe Mackey
Party	Republican	Democratic
Popular vote	225,531	112,984
Percentage	66.6%	33.4%
- County results Baird: 50–60% 60–70% 70–80%
U.S. Representative before election
Jim Baird
Republican
Elected U.S. Representative
Jim Baird
Republican

The 4th district is located in west-central Indiana taking in Lafayette, Kokomo, and the western suburbs of Indianapolis. The incumbent was Republican Jim Baird, who was elected with 64.1% of the vote in 2018.

=== Republican primary ===
==== Candidates ====
===== Nominee =====
- Jim Baird, incumbent U.S. Representative

==== Primary results ====
Republican primary results
Party	Candidate	Votes	%
Republican	Jim Baird (incumbent)	65,806	100.0
Total votes		65,806	100.0

=== Democratic primary ===
==== Candidates ====
===== Nominee =====
- Joe Mackey, retired machinist

===== Eliminated in primary =====
- Ben Frederick
- Howard Pollchik
- Veronikka Ziol, transgender rights activist

==== Primary results ====
Democratic primary results
Party	Candidate	Votes	%
Democratic	Joe Mackey	18,086	53.9
Democratic	Veronikka Ziol	9,630	28.7
Democratic	Ben Frederick	4,484	13.4
Democratic	Howard Pollchik	1,328	4.0
Total votes		33,528	100.0

=== General election ===
==== Predictions ====
Source	Ranking	As of
The Cook Political Report	Safe R	July 2, 2020
Inside Elections	Safe R	June 2, 2020
Sabato's Crystal Ball	Safe R	July 2, 2020
Politico	Safe R	April 19, 2020
Daily Kos	Safe R	June 3, 2020
RCP	Safe R	June 9, 2020
Niskanen	Safe R	June 7, 2020

==== Results ====
Indiana's 4th congressional district, 2020
Party	Candidate	Votes	%
Republican	Jim Baird (incumbent)	225,531	66.6
Democratic	Joe Mackey	112,984	33.4
Total votes		338,515	100.0
Republican hold			

== District 5 ==
2020 Indiana's 5th congressional district election
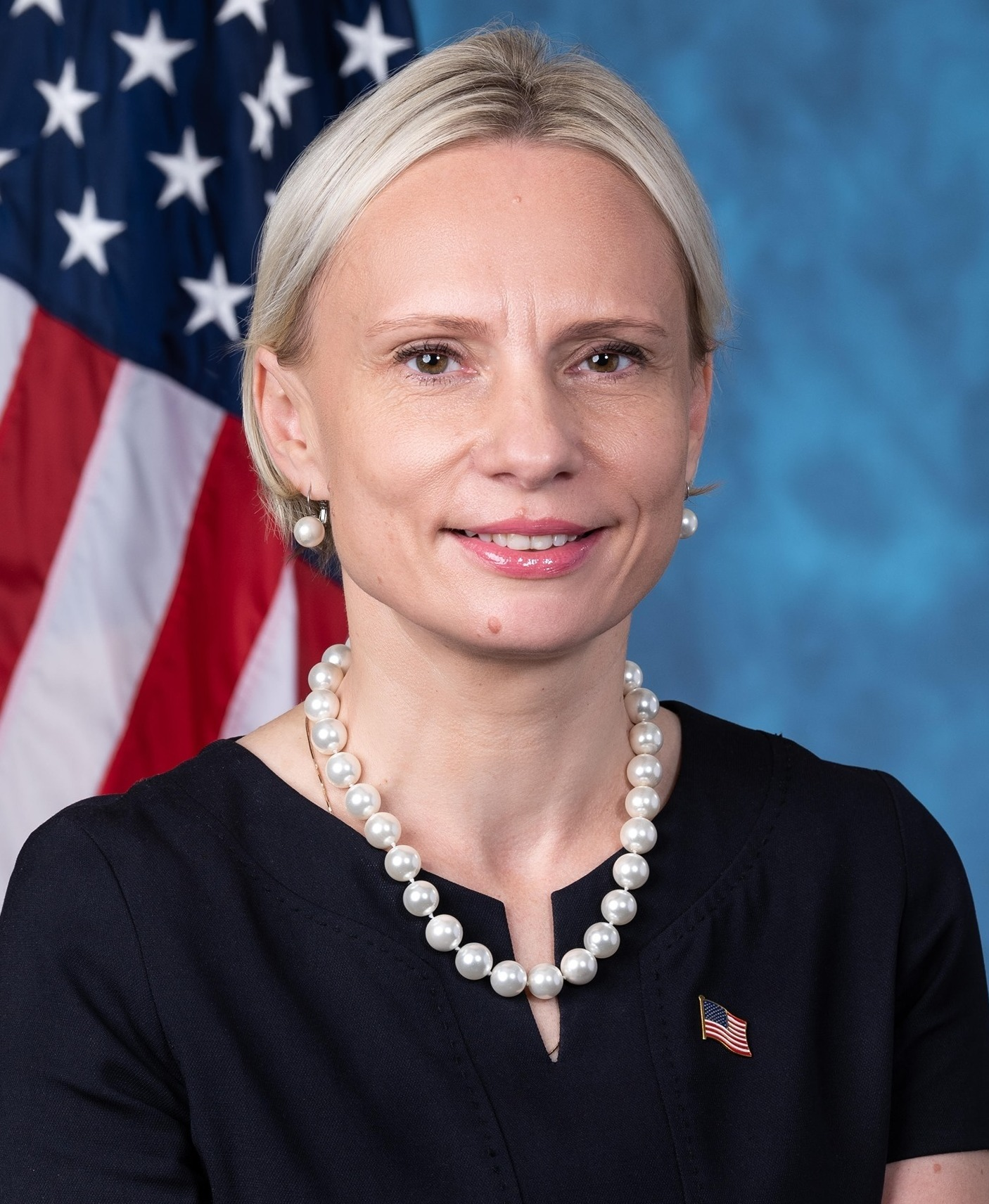

Nominee	Victoria Spartz	Christina Hale
Party	Republican	Democratic
Popular vote	208,212	191,226
Percentage	50.0%	46.0%
- County results Spartz: 50–60% 60–70% Hale: 60–70%
U.S. Representative before election
Susan Brooks
Republican
Elected U.S. Representative
Victoria Spartz
Republican

The 5th district encompasses northern Indianapolis and its eastern and northern suburbs, including Marion, Carmel, Anderson, Noblesville, Fishers, and parts of Kokomo. The incumbent was Republican Susan Brooks, who was re-elected with 56.8% of the vote in 2018, and announced on June 14, 2019, that she would not seek re-election to a 5th term in Congress.

=== Republican primary ===
==== Nominee ====
- Victoria Spartz, State Senator

===== Eliminated in primary =====
- Kent W. Abernathy, former commissioner of Indiana's Bureau of Motor Vehicles
- Andrew Bales, retired teacher
- Micah Beckwith, pastor
- Carl Brizzi, former Marion County prosecutor
- Allen Davidson, highway engineer
- Chuck Dietzen, physician and founder of Timmy Global Health
- Beth Henderson, nurse
- Matt Hook, retired accountant and attorney
- Matthew Hullinger
- Kelly Mitchell, Indiana State Treasurer
- Danny Niederberger, accountant
- Mark Small, attorney and progressive activist
- Russell Stwalley
- Victor Wakley, executive director of Save Our Veterans, Inc.

==== Withdrawn ====
- Steve Braun, former commissioner of the Indiana Department of Workforce Development, candidate for Indiana's 4th congressional district in 2018 and brother of U.S. Senator Mike Braun (suspended campaign due to health issues)

==== Declined ====
- Jerome Adams, Surgeon General and former Indiana Health Commissioner
- Greg Ballard, former mayor of Indianapolis
- Brian Bosma, Speaker of the Indiana House of Representatives
- James Brainard, mayor of Carmel
- Susan Brooks, incumbent U.S. representative
- Suzanne Crouch, Lieutenant Governor of Indiana (running for re-election)
- Mike Delph, former state senator
- Scott Fadness, mayor of Fishers
- Mitch Frazier, businessman
- Jennifer Hallowell, political consultant
- Kyle Hupfer, chairman of the Indiana Republican Party
- Todd Huston, state representative
- Leah McGrath, deputy mayor of Fishers and Vice Chair of the Indiana Republican Party
- Michael McQuillen, Minority Leader of the Indianapolis City-County Council
- Todd Rokita, former U.S. representative for Indiana's 4th congressional district and candidate for U.S. Senate in 2018 (endorsed Delph)
- John Ruckelshaus, state senator
- Megan Savage, Chief of Staff to Susan Brooks
- Pete Seat, executive director of the Indiana Republican Party and former White House spokesman

==== Endorsements ====
Victoria Spartz

Organizations

- Club for Growth
- Indiana Right to Life PAC (co-endorsed with Beth Henderson)
- NRA Political Victory Fund
Beth Henderson

U.S. senators

- Mike Braun, U.S. senator from Indiana

U.S. representatives

- Dan Burton, former U.S. representative (IN-05, IN-06) (1983–2013)

Organizations

- Indiana Right to Life PAC (co-endorsed with Victoria Spartz)

==== Polling ====
Poll source	Date(s) administered	Sample size (Note: Key: A – all adults RV – registered voters LV – likely voters V – unclear)	Margin of error	Micah Beckwith	Carl Brizzi	Beth Henderson	Victoria Spartz	Other	Undecided
WPA Intelligence (R) (Note: Poll sponsored by the Club for Growth, a PAC which has endorsed Victoria Spartz.)	May 11–13, 2020	409 (LV)	± 4.9%	8%	14%	13%	32%	18% (Note: Mitchell with 5%; Dietzen with 3%; "other candidates total" with 10%)	21%

==== Primary results ====
Republican primary results
Party	Candidate	Votes	%
Republican	Victoria Spartz	34,526	39.7
Republican	Beth Henderson	15,343	17.6
Republican	Micah Beckwith	11,063	12.7
Republican	Carl Brizzi	5,619	6.5
Republican	Kent W. Abernathy	4,901	5.6
Republican	Kelly Mitchell	4,643	5.3
Republican	Chuck Dietzen	4,071	4.7
Republican	Matt Hook	2,147	2.5
Republican	Andrew Bales	1,329	1.5
Republican	Mark Small	1,057	1.2
Republican	Danny Niederberger	675	0.8
Republican	Victor Wakley	465	0.5
Republican	Allen Davidson	411	0.5
Republican	Russell Stwalley	379	0.4
Republican	Matthew Hullinger	333	0.4
Total votes		86,962	100.0

=== Democratic primary ===
==== Candidates ====
===== Nominee =====
- Christina Hale, former state representative and nominee for Lieutenant Governor of Indiana in 2016

===== Eliminated in primary =====
- Jennifer Christie, environmental chemist
- Andy Jacobs Jr., Marion County deputy prosecutor and son of Andrew Jacobs Jr.
- Ralph Spelbring, perennial candidate
- Dee Thornton, corporate consultant and nominee for Indiana's 5th congressional district in 2018

===== Declined =====
- Carey Hamilton, state representative

==== Endorsements ====
Christina Hale

Federal officials

- Seth Moulton, U.S. representative (MA-06)

Labor unions

- Brotherhood of Locomotive Engineers and Trainmen
- Indiana/Kentucky/Ohio Regional Council of Carpenters
- International Brotherhood of Boilermakers, Iron Ship Builders, Blacksmiths, Forgers and Helpers
- International Brotherhood of Electrical Workers
- International Brotherhood of Teamsters
- International Union of Operating Engineers
- SMART
- United Food and Commercial Workers Local 700
- United Steelworkers

Organizations

- American Association for Justice PAC
- Democratic Congressional Campaign Committee
- EMILY's List
- Everytown for Gun Safety
- Human Rights Campaign
- NARAL Pro-Choice America
- New Democrat Coalition
- Planned Parenthood Action Fund
- Serve America PAC

==== Primary results ====
Democratic primary results
Party	Candidate	Votes	%
Democratic	Christina Hale	30,123	40.8
Democratic	Dee Thornton	20,049	27.1
Democratic	Jennifer Christie	13,345	18.1
Democratic	Andy Jacobs Jr.	9,817	13.3
Democratic	Ralph Spelbring	575	0.8
Total votes		73,909	100.0

=== Libertarian primary ===
==== Candidates ====
===== Nominee =====
- Ken Tucker

=== General election ===
==== Debates ====
- Complete video of debate, September 22, 2020

==== Predictions ====
Source	Ranking	As of
The Cook Political Report	Tossup	August 21, 2020
Inside Elections	Tilt D (flip)	October 29, 2020
Sabato's Crystal Ball	Lean D (flip)	November 2, 2020
Politico	Tossup	September 9, 2020
Daily Kos	Tossup	August 31, 2020
RCP	Tossup	October 24, 2020
Niskanen	Lean D (flip)	July 26, 2020

==== Post-primary endorsements ====
Christina Hale (D)

US presidents

- Barack Obama, 44th president of the United States

State officials

- Jennifer McCormick, Indiana Superintendent of Public Instruction (Republican)

Local officials

- Pete Buttigieg, former mayor of South Bend and former 2020 presidential candidate

Organizations

- BOLD PAC
- Giffords
- League of Conservation Voters
Victoria Spartz (R)

U.S. Executive Branch officials

- Mike Pence, 48th vice president of the United States
- Donald Trump, 45th president of the United States

U.S. representatives

- Susan Brooks, U.S. representative from Indiana's 5th congressional district
- Kevin McCarthy, House Minority Leader and U.S. Representative from California's 23rd congressional district
- Steve Scalise, House Minority Whip and U.S. Representative from Louisiana's 1st congressional district

State legislators

- Ron Alting, state senator from Indiana's 22nd district
- Eric Bassler, state senator from Indiana's 39th district
- Phil Boots, state senator from Indiana's 23rd district
- Liz Brown, state senator from Indiana's 15th district
- Brian Buchanan, state senator from Indiana's 7th district
- Jim Buck, state senator from Indiana's 21st district
- Tony Cook, state representative from Indiana's 32nd district
- Chuck Goodrich, state representative from Indiana's 29th district
- Mike Karickhoff, state representative from Indiana's 30th district
- Mark Messmer, state senator from Indiana's 48th district
- Chip Perfect, state senator from Indiana's 43rd district
- Jeff Raatz, state senator from Indiana's 27th district
- David Wolkins, state representative from Indiana's 18th district
- Andy Zay, state senator from Indiana's 17th district

Organizations

- Maggie's List
- National Federation of Independent Business
- Susan B. Anthony List
- Tea Party Express

==== Polling ====
Poll source	Date(s) administered	Sample size	Margin of error	Victoria Spartz (R)	Christina Hale (D)	Other/ Undecided
Change Research	October 29 – November 1, 2020	596 (LV)	± 4.1%	46%	46%	9% (Note: Tucker (L) with 5%; "Don't recall" with 2%; Did not vote with 1%; Would not vote with 0%; Undecided with 1%)
Global Strategy Group (D) (Note: Poll sponsored by The House Majority PAC, which exclusively supports Democratic candidates for Congress.)	August 17–19, 2020	400 (LV)	± 4.9%	40%	47%	13% (Note: "Undecided/Refused" with 9%; Tucker (L) with 4%)
Tulchin Research (D) (Note: Poll sponsored by the DCCC.)	August 5–10, 2020	400 (LV)	± 4.9%	45%	50%	–
WPA Intelligence (R) (Note: Poll sponsored by Club for Growth.)	August 4–6, 2020	400 (LV)	± 4.9%	47%	40%	13% (Note: Tucker (L) with 5%; Undecided with 8%)
GBAO Strategies (D) (Note: Poll sponsored by Hale's campaign.)	June 25–28, 2020	500 (LV)	± 4.4%	45%	51%	–

Hypothetical polling

with Generic Republican and Generic Democrat

Poll source	Date(s) administered	Sample size	Margin of error	Generic Republican	Generic Democrat	Other/ Undecided
Global Strategy Group/House Majority PAC	August 17–19, 2020	400 (LV)	± 4.9%	44%	47%	9% (Note: Undecided with 8%; "Refused" with 1%)

==== Results ====
Indiana's 5th congressional district, 2020
Party	Candidate	Votes	%
Republican	Victoria Spartz	208,212	50.0
Democratic	Christina Hale	191,226	46.0
Libertarian	Ken Tucker	16,788	4.0
Total votes		416,226	100.0
Republican hold			

== District 6 ==
2020 Indiana's 6th congressional district election
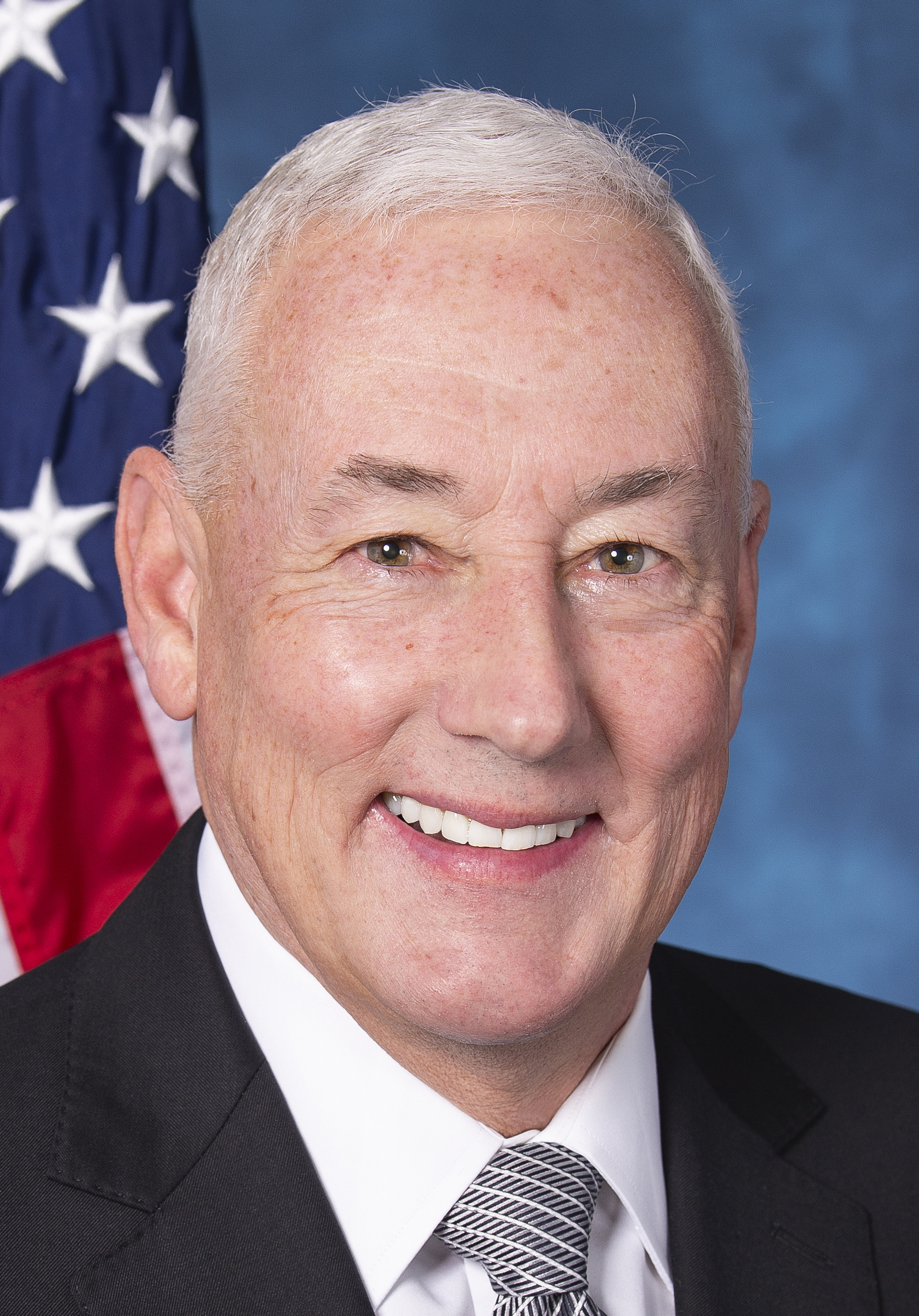

Nominee	Greg Pence	Jeannine Lake
Party	Republican	Democratic
Popular vote	225,318	91,103
Percentage	68.6%	27.8%
- County results Pence: 50–60% 60–70% 70–80%
U.S. Representative before election
Greg Pence
Republican
Elected U.S. Representative
Greg Pence
Republican

The 6th district is located in southeastern Indiana, taking in Muncie, Columbus, Richmond and the eastern exurbs of Indianapolis. The incumbent was Republican Greg Pence, who was elected with 63.8% of the vote in 2018.

=== Republican primary ===
==== Candidates ====
===== Nominee =====
- Greg Pence, incumbent U.S. Representative

===== Eliminated in primary =====
- Mike Campbell

==== Primary results ====
Republican primary results
Party	Candidate	Votes	%
Republican	Greg Pence (incumbent)	62,346	83.6
Republican	Mike Campbell	12,234	16.4
Total votes		74,580	100.0

=== Democratic primary ===
==== Candidates ====
===== Nominee =====
- Jeannine Lee Lake, journalist and nominee for Indiana's 6th congressional district in 2018

===== Eliminated in primary =====
- George Holland
- Barry Welsh, minister

==== Primary results ====
Democratic primary results
Party	Candidate	Votes	%
Democratic	Jeannine Lee Lake	23,900	70.3
Democratic	Barry Welsh	5,163	15.2
Democratic	George Holland	4,923	14.5
Total votes		33,986	100.0

=== Libertarian primary ===
==== Candidates ====
===== Nominee =====
- Tom Ferkinhoff

=== General election ===
==== Predictions ====
Source	Ranking	As of
The Cook Political Report	Safe R	July 2, 2020
Inside Elections	Safe R	June 2, 2020
Sabato's Crystal Ball	Safe R	July 2, 2020
Politico	Safe R	April 19, 2020
Daily Kos	Safe R	June 3, 2020
RCP	Safe R	June 9, 2020
Niskanen	Safe R	June 7, 2020

==== Results ====
Indiana's 6th congressional district, 2020
Party	Candidate	Votes	%
Republican	Greg Pence (incumbent)	225,318	68.6
Democratic	Jeannine Lee Lake	91,103	27.8
Libertarian	Tom Ferkinhoff	11,791	3.6
Total votes		328,212	100.0
Republican hold			

== District 7 ==
2020 Indiana's 7th congressional district election
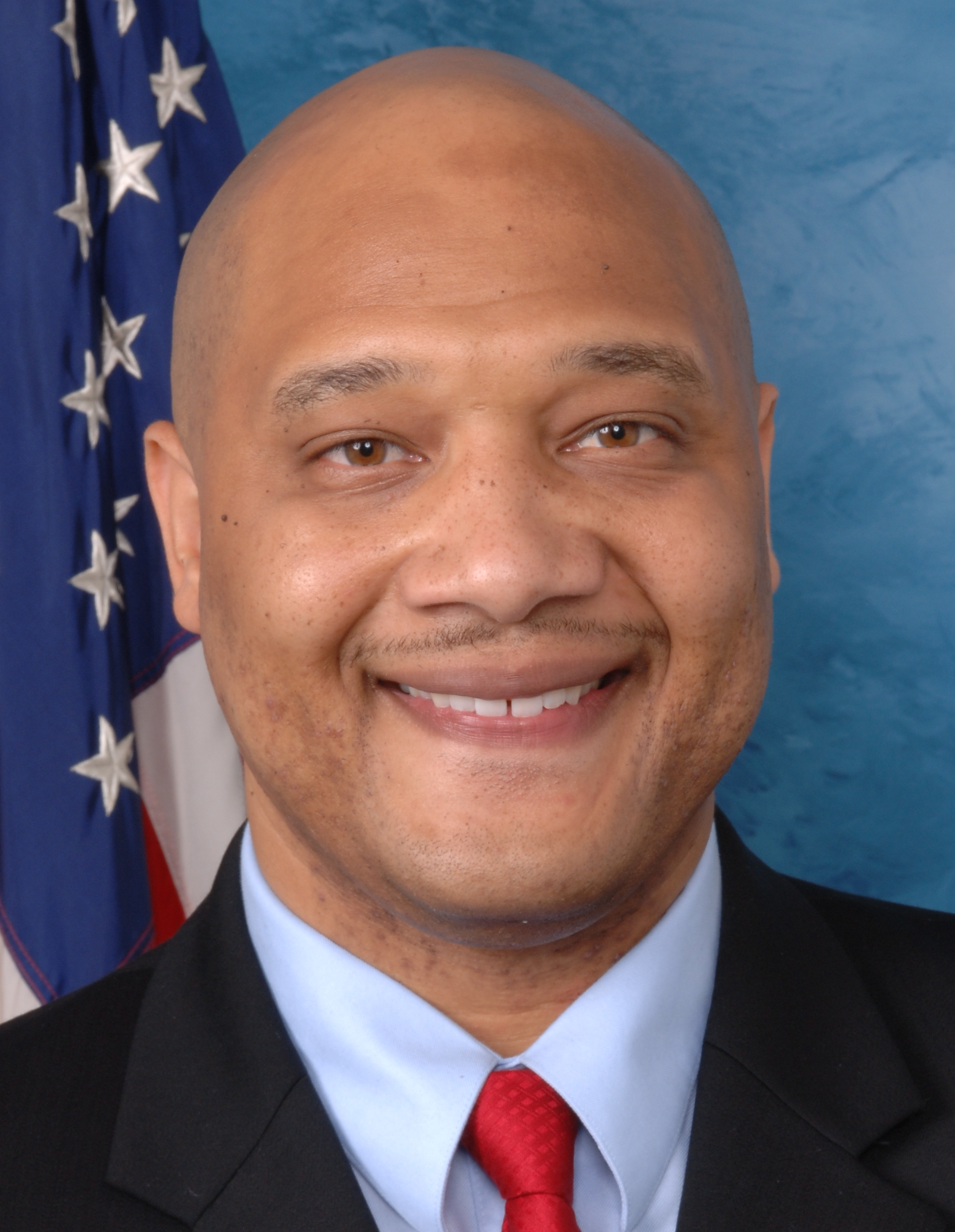

Nominee	André Carson	Susan Marie Smith
Party	Democratic	Republican
Popular vote	176,422	106,146
Percentage	62.4%	37.6%
- County result Carson: 60–70%
U.S. Representative before election
André Carson
Democratic
Elected U.S. Representative
André Carson
Democratic

The 7th district is centered around Indianapolis and the surrounding suburbs. The incumbent was Democrat André Carson, who was re-elected with 64.9% of the vote in 2018.

=== Democratic primary ===
==== Candidates ====
===== Nominee =====
- André Carson, incumbent U.S. Representative

===== Eliminated in primary =====
- Pierre Quincy Pullins, U.S. Army veteran

==== Primary results ====
Democratic primary results
Party	Candidate	Votes	%
Democratic	André Carson (incumbent)	62,117	91.8
Democratic	Pierre Quincy Pullins	5,572	8.2
Total votes		67,689	100.0

=== Republican primary ===
==== Candidates ====
===== Nominee =====
- Susan Marie Smith

===== Eliminated in primary =====
- Jon J. Davis
- Douglas L. Merrill
- JD Miniear
- Martin Ramey
- Gerald Walters

==== Primary results ====
Republican primary results
Party	Candidate	Votes	%
Republican	Susan Marie Smith	10,705	43.1
Republican	Douglas L. Merrill	3,519	14.2
Republican	JD Miniear	3,517	14.2
Republican	Jon J. Davis	2,712	10.9
Republican	Martin Ramey	2,209	8.9
Republican	Gerald Walters	2,189	8.8
Total votes		24,851	100.0

=== General election ===
==== Predictions ====
Source	Ranking	As of
The Cook Political Report	Safe D	July 2, 2020
Inside Elections	Safe D	June 2, 2020
Sabato's Crystal Ball	Safe D	July 2, 2020
Politico	Safe D	April 19, 2020
Daily Kos	Safe D	June 3, 2020
RCP	Safe D	June 9, 2020
Niskanen	Safe D	June 7, 2020

==== Results ====
Indiana's 7th congressional district, 2020
Party	Candidate	Votes	%
Democratic	André Carson (incumbent)	176,422	62.4
Republican	Susan Marie Smith	106,146	37.6
Total votes		282,568	100.0
Democratic hold			

== District 8 ==
2020 Indiana's 8th congressional district election
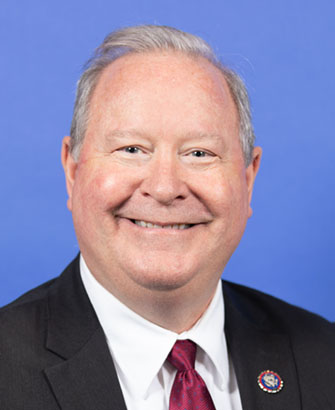

Nominee	Larry Bucshon	Thomasina Marsili
Party	Republican	Democratic
Popular vote	214,643	95,691
Percentage	66.9%	29.8%
- County results Bucshon: 50–60% 60–70% 70–80% 80–90%
U.S. Representative before election
Larry Bucshon
Republican
Elected U.S. Representative
Larry Bucshon
Republican

The 8th district is based in southwestern and west central Indiana, and includes the cities of Evansville and Terre Haute. The incumbent was Republican Larry Bucshon, who was re-elected with 64.4% of the vote in 2018.

=== Republican primary ===
==== Candidates ====
===== Nominee =====
- Larry Bucshon, incumbent U.S. representative

==== Primary results ====
Republican primary results
Party	Candidate	Votes	%
Republican	Larry Bucshon (incumbent)	51,343	100.0
Total votes		51,343	100.0

=== Democratic primary ===
==== Candidates ====
===== Nominee =====
- Thomasina Marsili, registered emergency medical technician

===== Eliminated in primary =====
- Ron Drake, attorney and former state legislator
- Mike Webster, computer distributions manager for SABIC

===== Declined =====
- John R. Gregg, former speaker of the Indiana House of Representatives (1996–2003) from the 45th district (1987–2003) and nominee for Governor of Indiana in 2012 and 2016
- Jonathan Weinzapfel, former mayor of Evansville (running for Attorney General)
- Charlie Wyatt, mayor of Boonville

==== Endorsements ====
E. Thomasina Marsili

Organizations

- Indivisible movement

==== Primary results ====
Democratic primary results
Party	Candidate	Votes	%
Democratic	Thomasina Marsili	15,097	36.3
Democratic	Mike Webster	13,550	32.6
Democratic	Ron Drake	12,973	30.2
Total votes		41,620	100.0

=== Libertarian primary ===
==== Candidates ====
===== Nominee =====
- James D. Rodenberger

=== General election ===
==== Predictions ====
Source	Ranking	As of
The Cook Political Report	Safe R	July 2, 2020
Inside Elections	Safe R	June 2, 2020
Sabato's Crystal Ball	Safe R	July 2, 2020
Politico	Safe R	April 19, 2020
Daily Kos	Safe R	June 3, 2020
RCP	Safe R	June 9, 2020
Niskanen	Safe R	June 7, 2020

==== Results ====
Indiana's 8th congressional district, 2020
Party	Candidate	Votes	%
Republican	Larry Bucshon (incumbent)	214,643	66.9
Democratic	Thomasina Marsili	95,691	29.8
Libertarian	James D. Rodenberger	10,283	3.2
Total votes		320,617	100.0
Republican hold			

== District 9 ==
2020 Indiana's 9th congressional district election
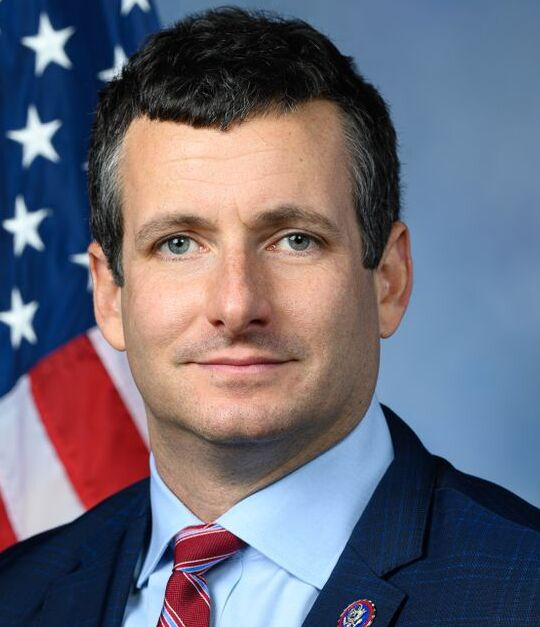

Nominee	Trey Hollingsworth	Andy Ruff
Party	Republican	Democratic
Popular vote	222,057	122,566
Percentage	61.8%	34.1%
- County results Hollingsworth: 50–60% 60–70% 70–80% Ruff: 60–70%
U.S. Representative before election
Trey Hollingsworth
Republican
Elected U.S. Representative
Trey Hollingsworth
Republican

The 9th district is based in south central Indiana, and includes the cities of Bloomington and Jeffersonville. The incumbent was Republican Trey Hollingsworth, who was re-elected with 56.5% of the vote in 2018.

=== Republican primary ===
==== Candidates ====
===== Nominee =====
- Trey Hollingsworth, incumbent U.S. representative

==== Endorsements ====
Trey Hollingsworth

Organizations

- National Right to Life Committee
- NRA Political Victory Fund

==== Primary results ====
Republican primary results
Party	Candidate	Votes	%
Republican	Trey Hollingsworth (incumbent)	62,962	100.0
Total votes		62,962	100.0

=== Democratic primary ===
==== Candidates ====
===== Nominee =====
- Andy Ruff, former Bloomington city councilman

===== Eliminated in primary =====
- D. Liam Dorris, U.S. Marine Corps veteran
- Brandon Hood, progressive activist
- James O’Gabhann, teacher
- Mark Powell, Lutheran pastor

==== Endorsements ====
Brandon Wesley Hood

Organizations

- Rose Caucus (retracted)
Andy Ruff

Federal politicians

- Baron Hill, former U.S. representative from Indiana's 9th congressional district

State politicians

- Terry Goodin, state representative
- John R. Gregg, former Speaker of the Indiana House of Representatives and nominee for Governor of Indiana in 2012 and 2016
- Mark Kruzan, former Majority Leader of the Indiana House of Representatives and former mayor of Bloomington
- Matt Pierce, state representative

Individuals

- Dan Cannon, civil rights lawyer and candidate for Indiana's 9th congressional district in 2018
- Liz Watson, Executive Director of the Congressional Progressive Caucus and nominee for Indiana's 9th congressional district in 2018

Organizations

- Our Revolution Southern Indiana

==== Primary results ====
Democratic primary results
Party	Candidate	Votes	%
Democratic	Andy Ruff	21,626	43.7
Democratic	Mark Powell	9,872	19.9
Democratic	D. Liam Dorris	7,813	15.8
Democratic	Brandon Hood	6,899	13.9
Democratic	James O’Gabhann	3,306	6.7
Total votes		49,516	100.0

=== Libertarian primary ===
==== Candidates ====
===== Nominee =====
- Tonya Lynn Millis

=== General election ===
==== Post-primary endorsements ====
Andy Ruff

Organizations

- Indiana AFL-CIO
- Indiana-Kentucky AFSCME

==== Predictions ====
Source	Ranking	As of
The Cook Political Report	Safe R	July 2, 2020
Inside Elections	Safe R	June 2, 2020
Sabato's Crystal Ball	Safe R	July 2, 2020
Politico	Likely R	April 19, 2020
Daily Kos	Safe R	June 3, 2020
RCP	Safe R	June 9, 2020
Niskanen	Safe R	June 7, 2020

==== Results ====
Indiana's 9th congressional district, 2020
Party	Candidate	Votes	%
Republican	Trey Hollingsworth (incumbent)	222,057	61.8
Democratic	Andy Ruff	122,566	34.1
Libertarian	Tonya Lynn Millis	14,415	4.0
Total votes		359,038	100.0
Republican hold			

== See also ==
- 2020 Indiana elections

== Notes ==
Partisan clients
