= Vi Simpson =

American politician (born 1946)

Member of the Indiana Senate from the 40th district
- In office November 7, 1984 – November 7, 2012
- Preceded by: Farrell N. Duckworth
- Succeeded by: Mark Stoops

Personal details
- Born: Viola Simpson; March 18, 1946 (age 80) Los Angeles, California, U.S.
- Party: Democratic
- Spouse: Bill McCarty
- Education: California State University, East Bay; Indiana University, Indianapolis

Vi Simpson (born March 18, 1946) is an American politician who is a former Democratic member of the Indiana Senate, representing the 40th District from 1984 to 2012. She was the Minority Leader of the Indiana Senate.

She was also the Democratic nominee for lieutenant governor, in the 2012 Indiana Gubernatorial Election, running with the former Speaker of the Indiana House of Representatives John R. Gregg. The Gregg/Simpson ticket lost in a narrow election to Mike Pence and Sue Ellspermann.

== Political career ==
Simpson was first elected to the office of Monroe County Auditor in 1981. In 1984, Simpson was elected to the Indiana Senate.

=== Committee assignments ===
- Rules & Legislative Procedure (Ranking Minority Member)
- Health & Provider Services
  - Provider Services Subcommittee
- Insurance & Financial Institutions
  - Insurance Subcommittee
- Joint Rules

Party political offices
Preceded by Dennie Oxley	Democratic nominee for Lieutenant Governor of Indiana; 2012	Succeeded by Christina Hale
