= Paul Mannweiler =

American politician (born 1949)

Paul Steven Mannweiler

Speaker of the Indiana House of Representatives
- In office November 9, 1994 – November 6, 1996
- Preceded by: Michael K. Phillips
- Succeeded by: John R. Gregg
- In office November 5, 1986 – November 7, 1990 Serving with Michael K. Phillips (1988–1990)
- Preceded by: J. Roberts Dailey
- Succeeded by: Michael K. Phillips

Member of the Indiana House of Representatives
- In office May 24, 1979 – November 30, 2001
- Preceded by: Robert Lambert Jones Jr. (Note: Jones was his predecessor in the 43rd district. William D. Roach Sr. was his predecessor in representing the 49th-numbered seat; while the 87th district was newly-established for 1992)
- Succeeded by: Cindy Noe (Note: Noe was his successor in the 87th district. Philip Tipton Warner was his successor in representing the 49th-numbered seat, and Robert F. Hellmann was his successor in representing the 43rd-numbered seat)
- Constituency: 87th (1992–2001); 49th (1982–1992); 43rd (1979–1982)

President of the National Conference of State Legislatures
- In office 1999–2000
- Preceded by: Dan Blue
- Succeeded by: Jim Costa

Personal details
- Born: July 20, 1949 (age 77)
- Party: Republican
- Education: Indiana University, Bloomington (BA); Indiana University, Indianapolis (JD)

Paul Steven Mannweiler (born July 20, 1949) is an American politician and attorney who served as a member of the Indiana House of Representatives serving from 1979 to 2001.

== Education ==
He received his undergraduate degree from Indiana University Bloomington and Juris Doctor degree from Indiana University, Indianapolis.

== Career ==
He served as Speaker of the Indiana House of Representatives from 1986 to 1990 and again from 1994 to 1996. He previously served as a political aide to Indiana Governor Otis Bowen.

From 1999 to 2000, Mannweiler served as president of the National Conference of State Legislatures.

== Notes ==
Indiana House of Representatives
Preceded by Robert Lambert Jones, Jr.	Member of the Indiana House of Representatives from the 43rd district 1979–1982	Succeeded by Robert F. Hellmann
Preceded by William D. Roach, Sr.	Member of the Indiana House of Representatives from the 49th district 1982–1992	Succeeded by Philip Tipton Warner
Preceded by Constituency established	Member of the Indiana House of Representatives from the 87th district 1992–2001	Succeeded by Cindy Noe
Political offices
Preceded by James R. Dailey	Speaker of the Indiana House of Representatives; 1986–1990	Succeeded by Michael K. Phillips
Preceded by Michael K. Phillips	Speaker of the Indiana House of Representatives; 1994–1996	Succeeded by John R. Gregg
