= 2016 Indiana gubernatorial election =

- November 8, 2016
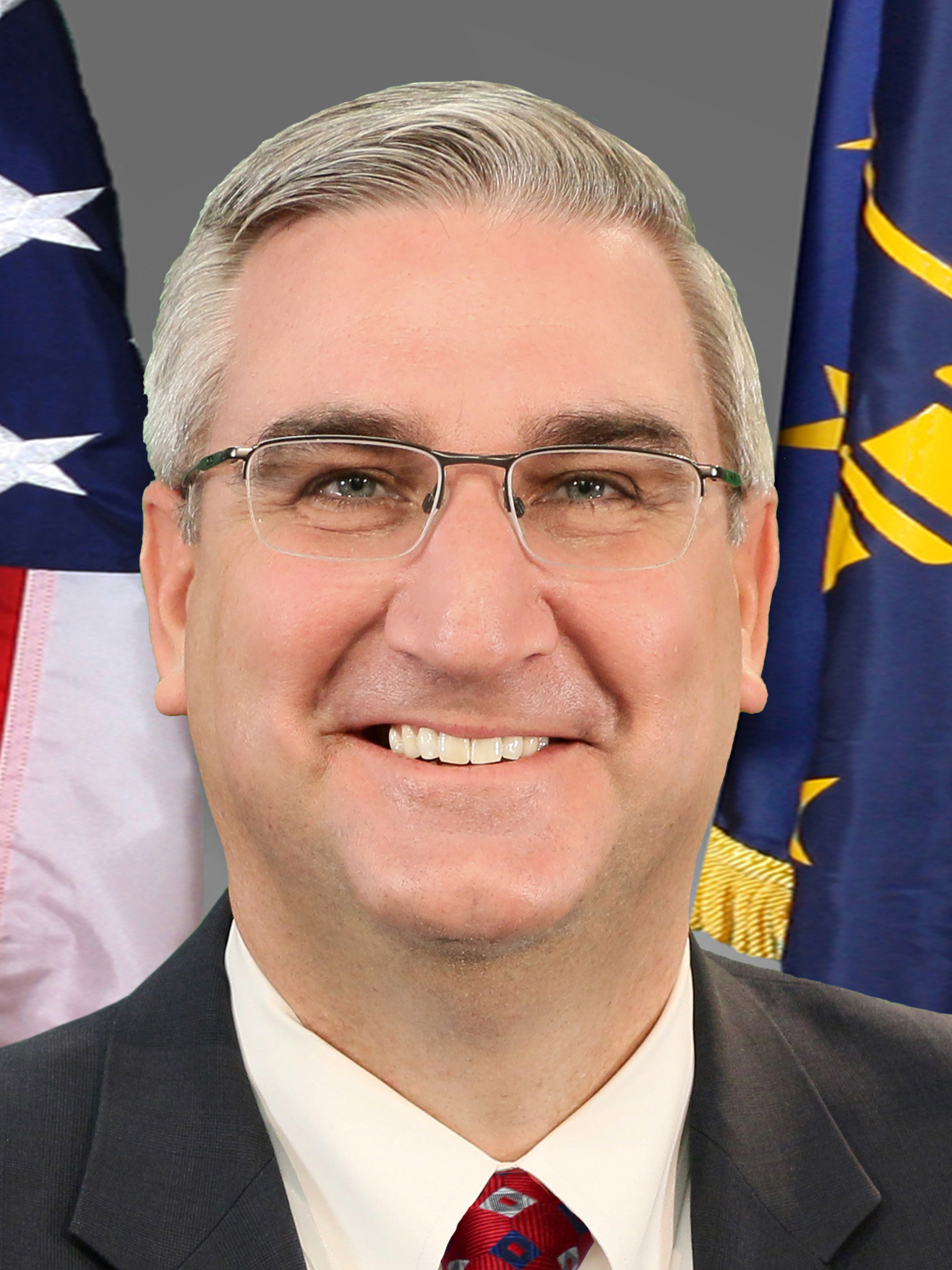

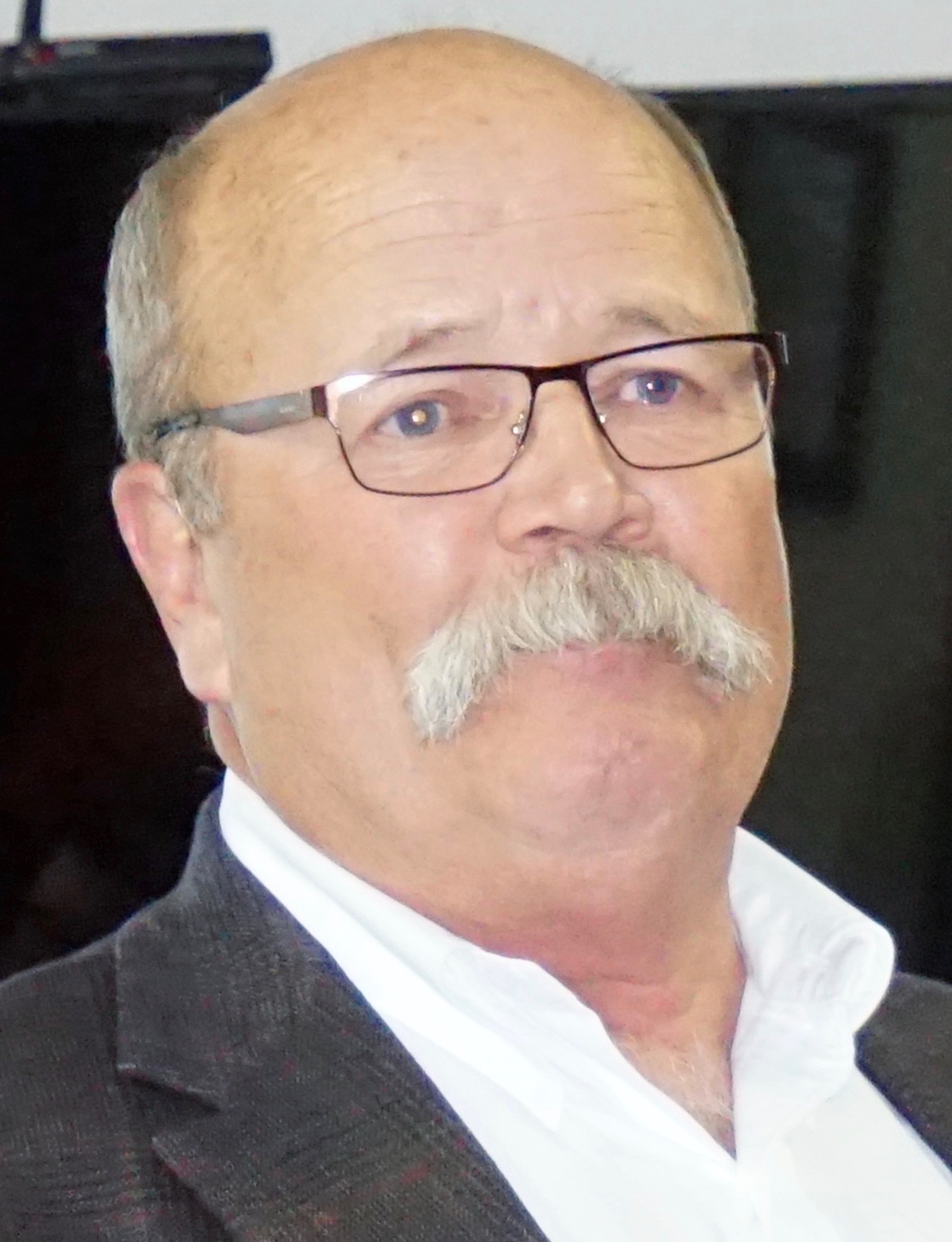
Nominee	Eric Holcomb (Note: Mike Pence was originally the Republican nominee, but withdrew after being chosen as the Republican vice presidential nominee in the 2016 presidential election, and was replaced by incumbent Lieutenant Governor Holcomb.)	John R. Gregg
Party	Republican	Democratic
Running mate	Suzanne Crouch	Christina Hale
Popular vote	1,397,396	1,235,503
Percentage	51.38%	45.42%
- Holcomb: 30–40% 40–50% 50–60% 60–70% 70–80% 80–90% >90% Gregg: 40–50% 50–60% 60–70% 70–80% 80–90% >90% Tie: 40–50% 50% No data
Governor before election
Mike Pence
Republican
Elected Governor
Eric Holcomb
Republican

The 2016 Indiana gubernatorial election was held on November 8, 2016, to elect the governor and lieutenant governor of Indiana, concurrently with the 2016 U.S. presidential election as well as elections to the United States Senate and elections to the United States House of Representatives and various state and local elections. The primaries were held on May 3, 2016. Republican lieutenant governor Eric Holcomb won the race with 51.4% of the vote.

Incumbent Republican Governor Mike Pence was running for reelection to a second term in office until July 15, 2016, when then-Republican presidential nominee Donald Trump selected Pence as his vice presidential running mate. As Pence was barred by Indiana law from simultaneously running for both offices, he subsequently withdrew from the gubernatorial election. Pence went on to be elected Vice President of the United States. He was replaced on the ballot for governor by his former running mate, incumbent lieutenant governor Eric Holcomb, who was selected by the Indiana Republican State Committee as the nominee on July 26, 2016. Holcomb later selected State Auditor Suzanne Crouch on August 1, 2016, to be his running mate as the nomination for lieutenant governor was made vacant by the decision of Holcomb to seek the gubernatorial nomination; she was confirmed at a subsequent meeting of the Indiana Republican State Committee later that day.

John Gregg, the former Speaker of the Indiana House of Representatives, was the Democratic nominee. Gregg previously ran for governor in 2012 but was defeated by Pence. As of 2026, this is the last time an Indiana gubernatorial election was decided by single digits.

== Republican primary ==
=== Candidates ===
==== Withdrew after nomination ====
- Mike Pence, incumbent governor (withdrew after primary to run for Vice President of the United States as the running mate of Donald Trump)

==== Declined ====
- Greg Ballard, former mayor of Indianapolis
- Susan Brooks, U.S. Representative from Indiana's 5th congressional district and former United States Attorney for the Southern District of Indiana (ran for re-election)
- Luke Messer, U.S. Representative from Indiana's 6th congressional district (ran for re-election)
- Todd Young, U.S. Representative from Indiana's 9th congressional district (ran for U.S. Senate)

=== Results ===
Republican primary results
Party	Candidate	Votes	%
Republican	Mike Pence (incumbent)	815,699	100.00%
Total votes		815,699	100.00%

== Republican State Committee selection ==
On July 15, 2016, Donald Trump announced that Pence would be his running mate as vice president in the 2016 presidential election. Under Indiana law, Pence was unable to run for both governor and vice president simultaneously; he therefore withdrew from the gubernatorial election, creating a vacancy on the Republican ticket. On July 26, the chairman of the Indiana Republican Party, Jeff Cardwell, announced that Eric Holcomb had been nominated by the Indiana Republican State Committee to replace Pence on the ballot for governor. The vote totals were not released. Holcomb later selected Suzanne Crouch on August 1, 2016, to be his running mate as the nomination for lieutenant governor was made vacant by the decision of Holcomb to seek the gubernatorial nomination; she was then confirmed by the Committee at a meeting later that day.

=== Candidates ===
==== Replacement nominee ====
- Eric Holcomb, Lieutenant Governor of Indiana
  - Running mate: Suzanne Crouch, Indiana State Auditor

==== Eliminated at state committee selection ====
- Susan Brooks, U.S. Representative and former United States Attorney for the Southern District of Indiana
- Todd Rokita, U.S. Representative and former Indiana Secretary of State
- Jim Tomes, state senator

==== Declined ====
- Brian Bosma, Speaker of the Indiana House of Representatives
- Mitch Daniels, former governor of Indiana
- Lloyd Winnecke, Mayor of Evansville

== Democratic primary ==
=== Candidates ===
==== Declared ====
- John R. Gregg, former Speaker of the Indiana House of Representatives and nominee for Governor in 2012
  - Running mate: Christina Hale, state representative

==== Withdrawn ====
- Glenda Ritz, Indiana Superintendent of Public Instruction (ran for re-election)
- Karen Tallian, state senator

==== Declined ====
- Evan Bayh, former U.S. Senator and former governor of Indiana (ran for U.S. Senate)
- Pete Buttigieg, Mayor of South Bend
- Greg Goodnight, Mayor of Kokomo
- Baron Hill, former U.S. Representative from Indiana's 9th congressional district and nominee for the U.S. Senate in 1990
- Scott Pelath, Minority Leader of the Indiana House of Representatives
- Tony Roswarski, Mayor of Lafayette
- Tom Sugar, vice president of Complete College America and former aide to Evan Bayh

=== Endorsements ===
John Gregg

Politicians

- Dennis Buckley, Mayor of Beech Grove
- Doug Campbell, Mayor of Austin
- Harold "Soup" Campbell, Mayor of North Vernon
- Dennis Carr, Mayor of Lawrenceburg
- Anthony Copeland, Mayor of East Chicago
- Collin Czilli, City Councilman, Portage
- Tom DeBaun, Mayor of Shelbyville
- Ted Ellis, Mayor of Bluffton
- Jon Flickinger, Mayor of Bicknell
- Randy Geesaman, Mayor of Portland
- Jack Gilfoy, Mayor of Clinton
- Greg Goodnight, Mayor of Kokomo
- Noel Harty, Mayor of Loogootee
- Pam Hendrickson, Mayor of Boonville
- Tom Henry, Mayor of Fort Wayne
- Dick Hickman, Mayor of Angola
- Robert Hurst, Mayor of Princeton
- Sally Hutton, Mayor of Richmond
- Dean Jessup, Mayor of Lawrence
- Mark Kruzan, Mayor of Bloomington
- Clint Lamb, Mayor of Sullivan
- Sue Murray, Mayor of Greencastle
- Gary Pruett, Mayor of Mitchell
- Glenda Ritz, Indiana Superintendent of Public Instruction
- Tony Roswarski, Mayor of Lafayette
- John Schultz, Mayor of Decatur
- Brian Snedecor, Mayor of Hobart
- Joe Stahura, Mayor of Whiting
- Randy Strasser, Mayor of Delphi
- Roy Terrell Jr., Mayor of Jasonville
- John Tucker, Mayor of Mount Vernon
- Dennis Tyler, Mayor of Muncie
- David Uran, Mayor of Crown Point
- John Wilkes, Mayor of Linton
- Hugh Wirth, Mayor of Oakland City
- Brian Wyndham, Mayor of Brazil
- Joe Yochum, Mayor of Vincennes
- Greg York, Mayor of New Castle

Organizations

- Indiana State AFL–CIO

=== Results ===
Democratic primary results
Party	Candidate	Votes	%
Democratic	John R. Gregg	547,375	100.00
Total votes		547,375	100.00

== Libertarian Party convention ==
=== Candidates ===
==== Declared ====
- Rex Bell, businessman
- Jim Wallace

==== Nominated ====
- Rex Bell, businessman
  - Running mate: Karl Tatgenhorst

== General election ==
=== Candidates ===
- Democratic: John R. Gregg, former Speaker of the Indiana House of Representatives and nominee for Governor in 2012
  - Running mate: Christina Hale, state representative
- Libertarian: Rex Bell, businessman
  - Running mate: Karl Tatgenhorst
- Republican: Eric Holcomb, Lieutenant Governor of Indiana
  - Running mate: Suzanne Crouch, Indiana State Auditor

=== Debates ===
- Governor:
  - Complete video of debate, September 27, 2016 - C-SPAN
  - Complete video of debate, October 3, 2016 - C-SPAN
  - Complete video of debate, October 25, 2016 - C-SPAN
- Lt. Governor:
  - Complete video of debate, August 9, 2016 - Hoosier Ag Today

=== Predictions ===
Source	Ranking	As of
The Cook Political Report	Tossup	August 12, 2016
Daily Kos	Tossup	October 14, 2016
Rothenberg Political Report	Tilt R	November 3, 2016
Sabato's Crystal Ball	Lean D (flip)	November 7, 2016
Real Clear Politics	Tossup	November 1, 2016
Governing	Tossup	October 27, 2016

=== Polling ===
Aggregate polls

Source of poll aggregation	Dates administered	Dates updated	Eric Holcomb (R)	John Gregg (D)	Other/Undecided (Note: Calculated by taking the difference of 100% and all other candidates combined.)	Margin
Real Clear Politics	October 27 – November 3, 2016	November 3, 2016	40.7%	44.0%	15.3%	Gregg +3.3%

Graphical summary

View source data.

Poll source	Date(s) administered	Sample size	Margin of error	Eric Holcomb (R)	John Gregg (D)	Rex Bell (L)	Undecided
SurveyMonkey	November 1–7, 2016	1,700	± 4.6%	47%	49%	–	4%
SurveyMonkey	October 31 – November 6, 2016	1,383	± 4.6%	46%	49%	–	5%
WTHR/Howey	November 1–3, 2016	600	± 4.0%	42%	42%	5%	11%
SurveyMonkey	October 28 – November 3, 2016	923	± 4.6%	47%	47%	–	6%
SurveyMonkey	October 27 – November 2, 2016	790	± 4.6%	48%	47%	–	5%
Gravis Marketing	October 30 – November 1, 2016	399	± 4.9%	38%	42%	4%	16%
SurveyMonkey	October 26 – November 1, 2016	638	± 4.6%	49%	47%	–	4%
SurveyMonkey	October 25–31, 2016	674	± 4.6%	47%	48%	–	5%
Monmouth University	October 27–30, 2016	402	± 4.9%	42%	48%	4%	5%
Gravis Marketing	October 22–24, 2016	596	± 2.3%	38%	42%	4%	16%
Ball State University (PSRAI)	October 10–16, 2016	544	± 4.8%	43%	48%	–	–
Monmouth University	October 11–13, 2016	402	± 4.9%	38%	50%	4%	7%
BK Strategies (R-Holcomb)	October 11–13, 2016	800	± 3.5%	42%	42%	3%	13%
WTHR/Howey	October 3–5, 2016	600	± 4.0%	39%	41%	5%	15%
WTHR/Howey	September 6–8, 2016	600	± 4.0%	35%	40%	6%	19%
Monmouth University	August 13–16, 2016	403	± 4.9%	42%	41%	4%	13%
Expedition Strategies (D-Gregg)	August 1–3, 2016	600	± 4.0%	39%	46%	6%	9%
The Tarrance Group	July 20–21, 2016	503	± 4.4%	34%	42%	–	24%

Hypothetical polling

with Mike Pence

Poll source	Date(s) administered	Sample size	Margin of error	Mike Pence (R)	John Gregg (D)	Other	Undecided
Bellwether Research	May 11–15, 2016	600	± 4.0%	40%	36%	—	24%
WTHR/Howey	April 18–21, 2016	500	± 4.3%	49%	45%	1%	5%
Bellwether Research	May 29–June 3, 2015	800	± 3.5%	40%	41%	—	19%
Bellwether Research	April 12–14, 2015	607	± 4.0%	43%	37%	—	21%
GQR Research	April 7–9, 2015	500	± 4.4%	47%	47%	—	6%

with Susan Brooks

Poll source	Date(s) administered	Sample size	Margin of error	Susan Brooks (R)	John Gregg (D)	Other	Undecided
The Tarrance Group	July 20–21, 2016	503	± 4.4%	36%	41%	—	23%

with Todd Rokita

Poll source	Date(s) administered	Sample size	Margin of error	Todd Rokita (R)	John Gregg (D)	Other	Undecided
The Tarrance Group	July 20–21, 2016	503	± 4.4%	36%	41%	—	23%
Public Opinion Strategies	July 16–18, 2016	600	± 4.0%	45%	43%	—	12%

with Baron Hill

Poll source	Date(s) administered	Sample size	Margin of error	Mike Pence (R)	Baron Hill (D)	Undecided
Bellwether Research	April 12–14, 2015	607	± 4%	43%	36%	21%

with Glenda Ritz

Poll source	Date(s) administered	Sample size	Margin of error	Mike Pence (R)	Glenda Ritz (D)	Other	Undecided
Bellwether Research	May 29–June 3, 2015	800	± 3.5%	42%	42%	—	16%
Bellwether Research	April 12–14, 2015	607	± 4%	42%	39%	—	18%

=== Results ===
2016 Indiana gubernatorial election
Party	Candidate	Votes	%	±%
Republican	Eric Holcomb/Suzanne Crouch	1,397,396	51.38%	+1.89%
Democratic	John R. Gregg/Christina Hale	1,235,503	45.42%	−1.14%
Libertarian	Rex Bell	87,025	3.20%	−0.75%
Write-in		44	0.00%	0.00%
Total votes		2,719,968	100.00%	N/A
Republican hold				

==== By county ====
County	Eric Holcomb Republican		John Gregg Democratic		Various candidates Other parties		Margin		Total
County	#	%	#	%	#	%	#	%	Total
Adams	8,408	64.4%	4,272	32.7%	371	2.8%	4,136	31.7%	13,051
Allen	80,458	54.8%	61,879	42.1%	4,482	3.1%	18,579	12.7%	146,819
Bartholomew	19,063	59.5%	11,869	37.0%	1,122	3.5%	7,194	22.5%	32,054
Benton	2,318	63.2%	1,201	32.7%	150	4.1%	1,117	30.5%	3,669
Blackford	2,719	56.8%	1,857	38.8%	213	4.4%	862	18.0%	4,789
Boone	19,269	59.9%	11,868	36.9%	1,009	3.1%	7,401	23.0%	32,146
Brown	4,488	56.4%	3,201	40.2%	272	3.4%	1,287	16.2%	7,961
Carroll	5,381	62.2%	2,923	33.8%	353	4.1%	2,458	28.4%	8,657
Cass	8,059	56.6%	5,662	39.8%	511	3.6%	2,397	16.8%	14,232
Clark	28,440	56.5%	20,293	40.3%	1,597	3.2%	8,147	16.2%	50,330
Clay	6,457	58.4%	4,260	38.5%	339	3.1%	2,197	19.9%	11,056
Clinton	7,126	61.1%	4,120	35.3%	423	3.6%	3,006	25.8%	11,669
Crawford	2,381	53.4%	1,924	43.1%	156	3.5%	457	10.3%	4,461
Daviess	6,460	60.2%	4,049	37.7%	217	2.0%	2,411	22.5%	10,726
Dearborn	16,606	71.5%	5,936	25.6%	670	2.9%	10,670	45.9%	23,212
Decatur	7,231	66.8%	3,291	30.4%	310	2.9%	3,940	36.4%	10,832
DeKalb	10,501	63.4%	5,340	32.2%	718	4.3%	5,161	31.2%	16,559
Delaware	20,777	46.6%	22,195	49.7%	1,653	3.7%	-1,418	-3.1%	44,625
Dubois	10,821	54.2%	8,171	40.9%	962	4.8%	2,650	13.3%	19,954
Elkhart	40,161	61.0%	23,749	36.1%	1,935	2.9%	16,412	23.9%	65,845
Fayette	5,485	59.0%	3,369	36.2%	441	4.7%	2,116	22.8%	9,295
Floyd	20,783	56.2%	15,176	41.0%	1,042	2.8%	5,607	15.2%	37,001
Fountain	4,792	64.1%	2,404	32.2%	277	3.7%	2,388	31.9%	7,473
Franklin	7,795	72.5%	2,697	25.1%	254	2.4%	5,098	48.4%	10,746
Fulton	5,142	61.1%	2,977	35.4%	291	3.5%	2,165	25.7%	8,410
Gibson	9,203	59.3%	5,969	38.5%	344	2.2%	3,234	20.8%	15,516
Grant	14,928	59.6%	9,257	36.9%	876	3.5%	5,671	22.7%	25,061
Greene	6,834	49.7%	6,610	48.1%	310	2.3%	224	1.6%	13,754
Hamilton	90,381	58.4%	60,176	38.9%	4,148	2.7%	30,205	19.5%	154,705
Hancock	22,681	62.5%	12,350	34.0%	1,271	3.5%	10,331	28.5%	36,302
Harrison	11,690	63.5%	6,303	34.2%	418	2.3%	5,837	29.3%	18,411
Hendricks	45,207	60.6%	27,180	36.4%	2,228	3.0%	18,027	24.2%	74,615
Henry	10,769	53.6%	7,551	37.6%	1,786	8.9%	3,218	16.0%	20,106
Howard	19,903	53.8%	15,812	42.7%	1,290	3.5%	4,091	11.1%	37,005
Huntington	10,092	64.2%	4,941	31.4%	679	4.3%	5,151	32.8%	15,712
Jackson	11,320	65.1%	5,613	32.3%	466	2.7%	5,707	32.8%	17,399
Jasper	8,086	61.3%	4,730	35.8%	378	2.9%	3,356	25.5%	13,194
Jay	4,603	58.9%	2,935	37.6%	276	3.5%	1,668	21.3%	7,814
Jefferson	7,505	56.8%	5,373	40.6%	344	2.6%	2,132	16.2%	13,222
Jennings	7,089	64.2%	3,609	32.7%	341	3.1%	3,480	31.5%	11,039
Johnson	42,465	63.6%	22,263	33.4%	1,994	3.0%	20,202	30.2%	66,722
Knox	6,511	42.3%	8,597	55.8%	292	1.9%	-2,086	-13.5%	15,400
Kosciusko	22,296	69.6%	8,454	26.4%	1,267	4.0%	13,842	43.2%	32,017
LaGrange	6,316	65.7%	2,951	30.7%	345	3.6%	3,365	35.0%	9,612
Lake	64,997	33.0%	127,491	64.7%	4,640	2.5%	-62,494	-31.7%	197,128
LaPorte	18,465	41.7%	24,139	54.5%	1,668	3.8%	-5,674	-12.8%	44,272
Lawrence	11,683	62.6%	6,402	34.3%	576	3.1%	5,281	28.3%	18,661
Madison	27,579	51.4%	24,041	44.8%	2,063	3.8%	3,538	6.6%	53,683
Marion	127,462	35.0%	226,116	62.1%	10,718	2.9%	-98,654	-27.1%	364,296
Marshall	10,481	58.8%	6,772	38.0%	577	3.2%	3,709	20.8%	17,830
Martin	2,829	59.3%	1,823	38.2%	120	2.5%	1,006	21.1%	4,772
Miami	8,094	61.1%	4,596	34.7%	549	4.1%	3,498	26.4%	13,239
Monroe	19,915	34.3%	36,304	62.4%	1,919	3.3%	-16,389	-28.1%	58,138
Montgomery	9,412	62.1%	5,201	34.3%	551	3.6%	4,211	27.8%	15,164
Morgan	20,430	66.1%	9,356	30.3%	1,128	3.6%	11,074	35.8%	30,914
Newton	3,484	60.5%	2,066	35.9%	205	3.6%	1,418	24.6%	5,755
Noble	10,475	63.0%	5,512	33.2%	637	3.8%	4,963	29.8%	16,624
Ohio	1,805	63.1%	996	34.8%	60	2.1%	809	28.3%	2,861
Orange	4,827	60.1%	2,971	37.0%	229	2.9%	1,856	23.1%	8,027
Owen	5,085	59.9%	3,073	36.2%	334	3.9%	2,012	23.7%	8,492
Parke	3,824	57.6%	2,608	39.3%	207	3.1%	1,216	18.3%	6,639
Perry	3,520	44.4%	4,222	53.2%	193	2.4%	-702	-8.8%	7,935
Pike	3,114	52.6%	2,671	45.2%	130	2.2%	443	7.4%	5,915
Porter	32,913	42.8%	41,563	54.1%	2,392	3.1%	-8,650	-11.3%	76,868
Posey	7,202	57.7%	5,028	40.3%	250	2.0%	2,174	17.4%	12,480
Pulaski	3,001	57.1%	2,069	39.4%	185	3.5%	932	17.7%	5,255
Putnam	9,094	62.1%	5,049	34.5%	490	3.3%	4,045	27.6%	14,633
Randolph	6,094	59.8%	3,621	35.5%	482	4.7%	2,473	24.3%	10,197
Ripley	8,948	70.0%	3,540	27.7%	291	2.3%	5,408	42.3%	12,779
Rush	4,393	61.5%	2,440	34.2%	306	4.3%	1,953	27.3%	7,139
Scott	4,869	54.4%	3,830	42.8%	245	2.7%	1,039	11.6%	8,944
Shelby	10,998	61.6%	6,162	34.5%	691	3.9%	4,836	27.1%	17,851
Spencer	5,511	56.4%	4,030	41.2%	233	2.4%	1,481	15.2%	9,774
St. Joseph	48,839	44.4%	57,835	52.5%	3,421	3.1%	-8,996	-8.1%	110,095
Starke	4,694	52.4%	3,903	43.5%	368	4.1%	791	8.9%	8,965
Steuben	9,180	62.9%	4,917	33.7%	507	3.5%	4,263	29.2%	14,604
Sullivan	3,623	42.5%	4,720	55.4%	176	2.1%	-1,097	-12.9%	8,519
Switzerland	2,116	58.9%	1,379	38.4%	100	2.8%	737	20.5%	3,595
Tippecanoe	30,141	48.1%	30,234	48.2%	2,302	3.7%	-93	-0.1%	62,677
Tipton	4,712	63.1%	2,492	33.4%	259	3.5%	2,220	29.7%	7,463
Union	2,179	66.8%	936	28.7%	147	4.5%	1,243	38.1%	3,262
Vanderburgh	38,188	52.7%	32,370	44.7%	1,903	2.6%	5,818	8.0%	72,461
Vermillion	3,279	47.7%	3,339	48.6%	257	3.7%	-60	-0.9%	6,875
Vigo	16,772	42.2%	21,841	55.0%	1,096	2.8%	-5,069	-12.8%	39,709
Wabash	8,636	64.9%	4,262	32.0%	416	3.1%	4,374	32.9%	13,314
Warren	2,538	64.7%	1,260	32.1%	126	3.2%	1,278	32.6%	3,924
Warrick	17,418	59.1%	11,434	38.8%	627	2.1%	5,984	20.3%	29,479
Washington	7,293	65.0%	3,593	32.0%	341	3.0%	3,700	33.0%	11,227
Wayne	13,472	52.4%	9,518	37.0%	2,704	10.5%	3,954	15.4%	25,694
Wells	8,766	66.9%	3,902	29.8%	428	3.3%	4,864	37.1%	13,096
White	6,074	60.5%	3,586	35.7%	385	3.8%	2,488	24.8%	10,045
Whitley	9,972	64.2%	4,933	31.8%	616	3.9%	5,039	32.4%	15,521
Totals	1,397,396	51.4%	1,235,503	45.4%	87,069	3.2%	161,893	6.0%	2,719,968

Counties that flipped from Democratic to Republican

- Crawford (largest city: Marengo)
- Greene (largest city: Linton)
- Madison (largest city: Anderson)
- Pike (largest city: Petersburg)
- Scott (largest city: Scottsburg)
- Starke (largest city: Knox)

==== By congressional district ====
Holcomb won seven of nine congressional districts.

District	Holcomb	Gregg	Representative
1st	36%	62%	Pete Visclosky
2nd	53%	43%	Jackie Walorski
3rd	60%	37%	Marlin Stutzman
4th	58%	39%	Todd Rokita
5th	52%	45%	Susan Brooks
6th	59%	36%	Luke Messer
7th	34%	63%	André Carson
8th	52%	45%	Larry Bucshon
9th	56%	41%	Todd Young
