= Mark Stoops (politician) =

American politician

Member of the Indiana Senate from the 40th district
- In office November 19, 2012 – November 17, 2020
- Preceded by: Vi Simpson
- Succeeded by: Shelli Yoder

Personal details
- Party: Democratic
- Spouse: Kara Reagan Stoops
- Profession: Businessman, Rental Property Owner and Manager

Mark Stoops is a former Democratic member of the Indiana Senate who represented the 40th District from 2012 to 2020. He decided not to run for re-election to a third term. He was succeeded by fellow Democrat Shelli Yoder. Before being elected to the Indiana Senate, Stoops served as a Monroe County Commissioner. Stoops served on the commission from 1999 to 2006 and from 2008 to 2012, becoming a well-known opponent of Interstate 69. Stoops succeeded Vi Simpson, the former minority leader of the Democrats in the Indiana Senate. Stoops continues to oppose Interstate 69, and supports raising funding for public education.
