= Cindy Noe =

American politician

Member of the Indiana House of Representatives from the 87th district
- In office December 22, 2001 – November 7, 2012
- Preceded by: Paul Mannweiler
- Succeeded by: Christina Hale

Personal details
- Born: August 23, 1947 (age 79) St. Louis, Missouri, U.S.
- Party: Republican
- Spouse: John
- Children: 2, including Elise
- Education: Indiana University School of Business (BS)

Cindy J. Noe is an American politician who served as a member of the Indiana House of Representatives for the 87th District from 2002 to 2012. She served on the Education, Family, Children and Human Affairs committees.

== Early life and education ==
Noe was born in St. Louis, Missouri and raised in Indianapolis, Indiana. She earned a Bachelor of Science degree in business from Indiana University School of Business in 1969.

== Career ==
Representative Noe is the founder and CEO of IHM Facility Services, Inc., located in Fishers, Indiana. She graduated from the Indiana University School of Business and became the first Lugar Series and Indiana Leadership Forum graduate to serve in the House of Representatives. She has been elected Republican Precinct Committeewoman for Washington Township #36, 1996 – present. Rep. Noe also serves on the National Federation of Independent Business, Leadership Council; the Character Council of Indiana, Board of Directors; and as a member of Grace Community Church in Noblesville, Indiana.

== Personal life ==
Noe and her husband, John, have two children. She is a longtime resident of Marion County, Indiana. Cindy and John had two kids, including future state comptroller Elise Nieshalla.
