= Christina Hale =

American politician (born 1971)

Member of the Indiana House of Representatives from the 87th district
- In office November 20, 2012 – November 22, 2016
- Preceded by: Cindy Noe
- Succeeded by: Carey Hamilton

Personal details
- Born: July 17, 1971 (age 55) Long Beach, Indiana, U.S.
- Party: Democratic
- Spouse: Chris
- Children: 1
- Education: Purdue University (BS)
- Website: Campaign website

Christina Hale (born July 17, 1971) is an American politician and former State Representative of the 87th District in the Indiana House of Representatives, serving from 2012 to 2016. She previously worked as an executive at Kiwanis. In 2020, she was the Democratic nominee for U.S. Representative for Indiana's 5th congressional district, losing to Victoria Spartz by around 4 points.

== Early life and education ==
Hale was born and raised in Michigan City, Indiana. She is of partial Cuban descent. Hale earned a Bachelor of Science degree from Purdue University.

== Career ==
While studying at Purdue University, Hale worked various odd jobs to support her son. She later worked as a reporter for The La Porte County Herald-Argus until earning a scholarship to study abroad. After returning to the United States, she worked in the Indiana Department of Commerce and Indiana Professional Standards Board. She later served as an assistant to Governor Frank O'Bannon, where she was tasked with managing state regulatory boards and commissions. In 2004, she joined Kiwanis as a communications officer.

On May 25, 2016, John R. Gregg, the Democratic nominee for governor of Indiana, named Hale as his running mate for lieutenant governor in the 2016 election. In the general election on November 8, Gregg and Hale lost to Indiana Lieutenant Governor Eric Holcomb and State Auditor Suzanne Crouch.

In July 2019, Hale announced her intention to run for Congress in Indiana's 5th congressional district. In June 2019, incumbent Republican Susan Brooks announced that she would not seek reelection. On June 2, 2020, Hale won the Democratic primary for the 5th congressional district against State Senator Victoria Spartz. She lost to Spartz in the general election, taking 46% of the vote to Spartz's 50%. This was the closest race in the district since it was reconfigured as a northern suburban district in 1983 (it had been numbered as the 6th until 2003), and only the second time in that period that a Democrat managed 40% of the vote. Hale lost seven of the district's eight counties, but was able to keep the race close with a strong showing in her base in Indianapolis; her state house district included much of the district's share of Indianapolis.

== Personal life ==
Hale lives in Indianapolis with her husband Chris. She has one adult son from a previous relationship.

Party political offices
| Preceded by Vi Simpson | Democratic nominee for Lieutenant Governor of Indiana; 2016 | Succeeded by Linda Lawson |
Indiana House of Representatives
| Preceded by Cindy Noe | Member of the Indiana House of Representatives from the 87th district 2012–2016 | Succeeded by Carey Hamilton |
