= John R. Gregg =

American politician

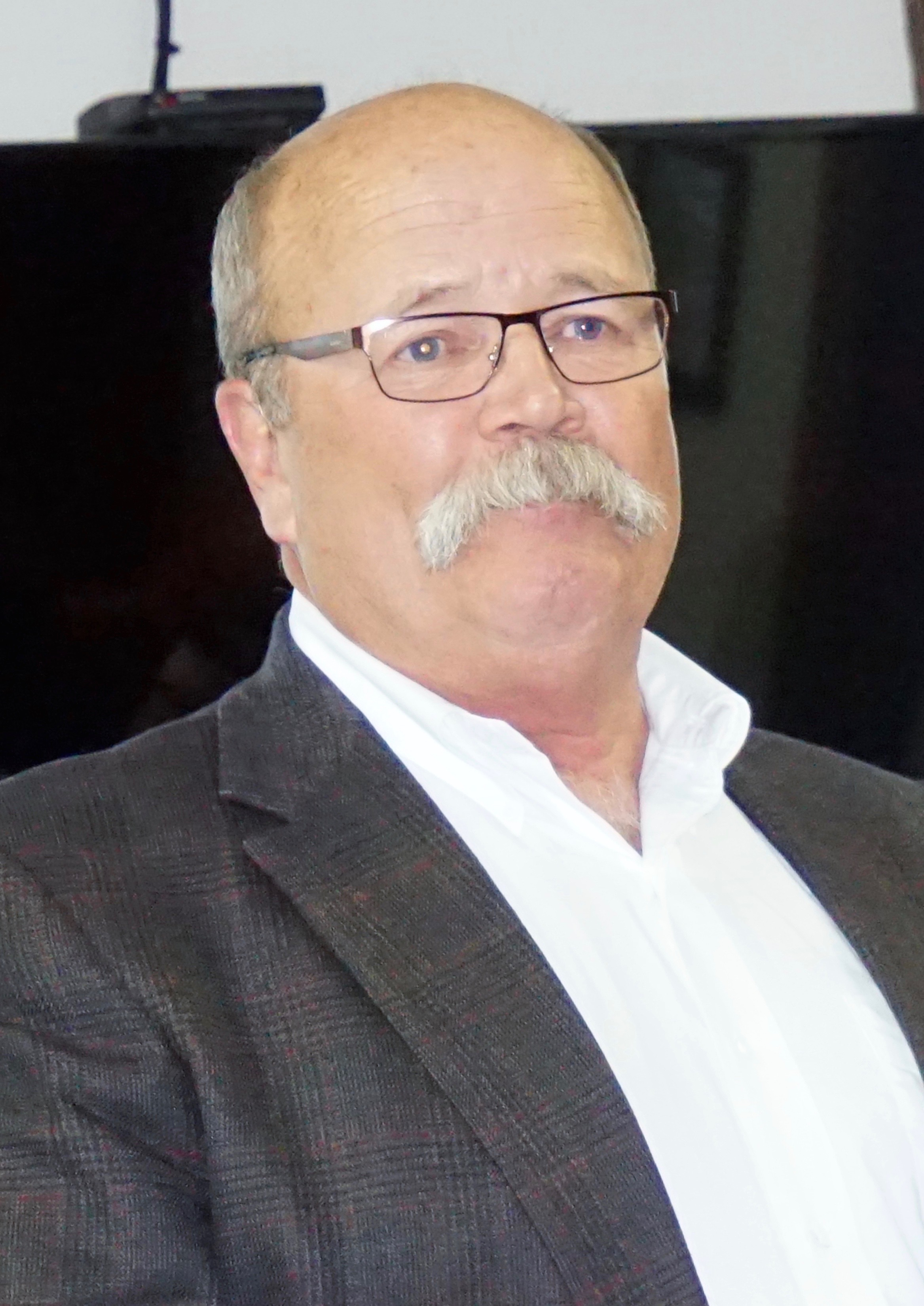
- Gregg in 2015

President of Vincennes University Acting
- In office August 2003 – July 2004
- Preceded by: Bryan Blanchard
- Succeeded by: Richard Helton

Speaker of the Indiana House of Representatives
- In office November 17, 1996 – January 3, 2003
- Preceded by: Paul Mannweiler
- Succeeded by: Patrick Bauer

Member of the Indiana House of Representatives from the 45th district
- In office January 3, 1987 – January 3, 2003
- Preceded by: Bill Roach
- Succeeded by: Alan Chowning

Personal details
- Born: John Richard Gregg; September 6, 1954 (age 72) Linton, Indiana, U.S.
- Party: Democratic
- Spouse: Lisa Kelly
- Education: Vincennes University (AS); Indiana University, Bloomington (BA); Indiana State University (MPA); Indiana University, Indianapolis (JD)

John Richard Gregg (born September 6, 1954) is an American politician, businessman, and attorney who served as the 85th and longest-serving Democratic speaker of the Indiana House of Representatives from 1996 to 2003. He served in the Indiana House of Representatives from 1987 to 2003.

Gregg served as majority leader from 1990 to 1994 and minority leader from 1994 to 1996. He was Indiana House speaker from 1996 to 2003. Gregg was the Democratic nominee for governor of Indiana in the 2012 election. He lost to then-Representative Mike Pence in the closest gubernatorial election in 52 years.

Gregg won the Democratic nomination for governor again in 2016. He was critical of Pence's emphasis on social issues, such as his signing of the controversial Religious Freedom Restoration Act, and his policies on public education and Hoosier workers. Pence withdrew from the election after Donald Trump chose him as his running mate in the 2016 presidential election. The state Republican party then nominated Lieutenant Governor Eric Holcomb for governor. Holcomb defeated Gregg, 51.4% to 45.4%.

== Early life and education ==
Gregg was born on September 6, 1954, to Donald R. and Beverly "June" (née Blackwood) Gregg in Linton, Greene County, Indiana. His father operated a union construction and hauling business. John Gregg was the oldest of his parents' three sons. He grew up in small, rural Sandborn, Knox County, Indiana.

Gregg was a 1972 graduate of North Knox High School. In 1974 he graduated with an associate degree from Vincennes University, where he was a member of Sigma Pi fraternity. He graduated from Indiana University Bloomington (B.A., political science and history) in 1976; Indiana State University (M.P.A., public administration) in 1978; and the Indiana University School of Law – Indianapolis (now Indiana University Robert H. McKinney School of Law) (J.D.) in 1984.

== Business and legal career ==
From 1978 to 1985 Gregg worked as a land agent for Peabody Coal Company and as a governmental affairs representative for Amax Coal Company. After passing the state bar in 1984, he opened a private practice, Gregg & Brock, in Vincennes, which he led until 2002, when he joined the Indianapolis law firm Sommer Barnard PC. In 2005 Gregg became partner at the Vincennes office of the law firm Bingham McHale, now Bingham Greenebaum Doll LLP. He is a member of the Indiana State Bar Association and the Knox County Bar Association, of which he served as president in 1992.

After his legislative career ended, Gregg served as Interim President of Vincennes University from August 2003 to July 2004, succeeding President Bryan K. Blanchard. Gregg was succeeded by Richard E. Helton.

Gregg is a partner at Ice Miller and an adjunct at the IU Indianapolis McKinney School of Law and IU's O’Neil School of Public Affairs at the main campus in Bloomington.

== Political career ==
Gregg was a Democratic precinct committeeman from 1974 to 1986. He was a delegate to the Democratic National Convention in 1992, 1996, 2000, 2008, 2012, and 2016. During the 2008 primary, Gregg was an honorary chair of the Hillary Clinton for President Indiana Campaign, and he accompanied former President Bill Clinton to events across Indiana.

=== Indiana House of Representatives ===
==== Elections ====
Gregg's legislative career spanned 8 elections. In 1986 he ran against and defeated Democratic incumbent Representative Bill Roach in the primary election to represent District 45 in the Indiana House of Representatives. He was reelected seven times, in 1988, 1990, 1992, 1994, 1996, 1998, and 2000. He represented Sullivan, Daviess, Greene, Knox, and Vigo counties.

==== Tenure ====
Over the span of his 16 years in the Indiana House, Gregg spent a dozen years in the most powerful positions in that chamber, and contributed twice to redistricting process that occurs every decade.

In 1990, Gregg went from a back-bencher in seat number 100 to the first position as House majority leader. He served as majority leader from 1990 to 1994 and as House Democratic leader from 1994 to 1996. As Democratic leader, he is remembered for his leadership of a walkout in 1995.

Gregg was first elected Speaker of the House in 1996, when the general election had left an equally divided House with 50 Democrats and 50 Republicans. For the first time in Indiana history, a single Speaker presided over an equally divided House. (In 1988, Michael K. Phillips (D-Boonville) and Paul S. Mannweiler (R-Indianapolis) shared the Speaker position in the first even-split between the two parties in history.) Gregg was reelected Speaker after the 1998 general election when Democrats took control of the House with a 53–47 majority.

Throughout his legislative career, Gregg was a proponent of tax cuts, including the elimination of the excise and inventory taxes and the reform of property taxes. While in the House, he was an advocate of balanced budgets and opposed gambling expansions, but later modified that stance, noting that gaming is "a business that is heavily regulated. We've not had indictments. We've not had any kind of federal investigations or anything like that [in Indiana]." During his tenure as Speaker, Gregg championed many causes, including reforms in education, campaign finance, lobbying and ethics, and negotiated a compromise between Democrats and Republicans to expand worker's compensation coverage and build Conseco Fieldhouse in downtown Indianapolis. He also implemented changes in House procedures, including on-time convening of sessions, a bipartisan clerk's office, staffing parity for both caucuses, and the prohibition of smoking in the interior hallways and offices surrounding the House chamber. Gregg introduced measures to help streamline the workload of legislators and staff, including reducing the number of standing committees from 21 to 17 and initiating stricter adherence to House rules about how members vote and conduct themselves on the House floor.

A House Resolution to honor Gregg on his retirement in 2002 credited him with returning civility and congeniality to the House chamber. One commentator noted that despite disagreements over policy ideas during his speakership, "it is hard to find an enemy of Gregg's at the Statehouse." Of Gregg's legislative career, former Governor Evan Bayh said, "[if there's] one thing about John Gregg, people on both sides of the aisle think he's a good person and a man of his word."

==== Election history ====
House Representative, District 45, 1986

The incumbent Democrat Bill Roach lost to John Gregg in the primary election.

Candidate	Affiliation	Support	Outcome
John Gregg	Democrat		Won
Bill Roach	Democrat		Lost

House Representative, District 45, 1988

John Gregg, in his first election as the incumbent, defeated opponent David Tatem, a Republican candidate from Terre Haute.

Candidate	Affiliation	Support	Outcome
John Gregg	Democrat		Won
David Tatum	Republican		Lost

House Representative, District 45, 1992

In 1992, Gregg ran unopposed for his fourth term.

Candidate	Affiliation	Support	Outcome
John Gregg	Democrat		Won
---	Republican		N/A

House Representative, District 45, 1994

John Gregg ran unopposed again for his fifth legislative term in 1994.

Candidate	Affiliation	Support	Outcome
John Gregg	Democrat	14,167	Won
---	Republican		N/A

House Representative, District 45, 1996

John Gregg won his sixth term against Republican opponent Julia Johnson Sheffler of Sullivan.

Candidate	Affiliation	Support	Outcome
John Gregg	Democrat	17,104	Won
Julia Johnson Sheffler	Republican	4,183	Lost

House Representative, District 45, 1998

John Gregg ran unopposed for his seventh term in 1998.

Candidate	Affiliation	Support	Outcome
John Gregg	Democrat	14,351	Won
---	Republican		N/A

House Representative, District 45, 2000

John Gregg again successfully defended his seat for his eighth term as state representative and as the incumbent Speaker of the House against his Republican opponent Bud Hood of Shelburn.

Candidate	Affiliation	Support	Outcome
John Gregg	Democrat	16,554	Won
Bud Hood	Republican	5,187	Lost

==== Committee assignments ====
- House County and Township Committee, 1986
- House Natural Resources Committee, 1986
- House Ways and Means Committee, 1988
- House Committee on Joint Rules
- House Committee on Rules & Legislative Procedures

=== 2012 gubernatorial campaign ===
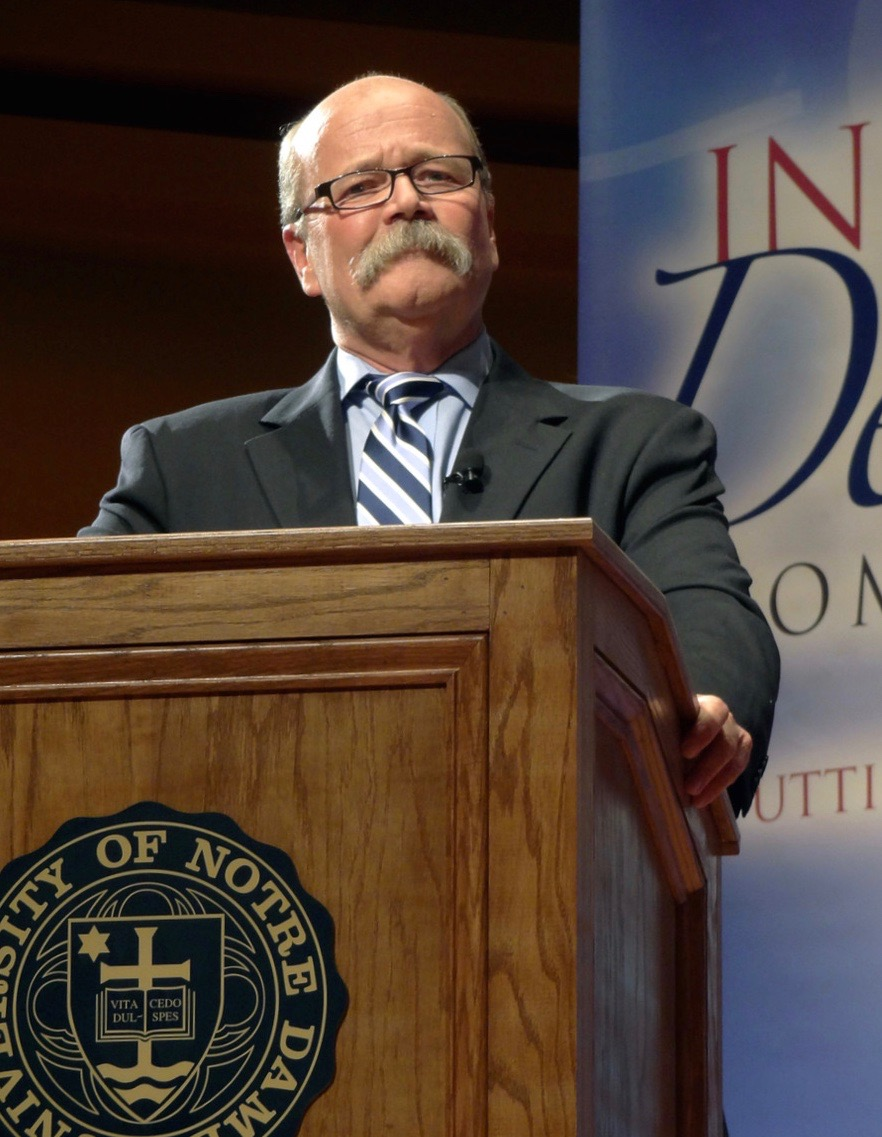
Gregg in 2012, at the gubernatorial debate

Gregg was the Democratic nominee for Governor of Indiana in the 2012 election. He faced Republican Congressman Mike Pence. Although originally predicted to lose decisively to Pence, Gregg closed the gap late in the election, winning 46% of the vote to Pence's 49%. Gregg's campaign was focused on putting Indiana back to work in the midst of the economic recession, and called for an armistice on social issues. He attempted to brand Pence as an extremist Washington politician, which was effective with some demographics, particularly women, but did not carry the election.

Democratic Indiana gubernatorial election primary in Indiana, 2012
Party	Candidate	Votes	%
Democratic	John Gregg	207,365	100
Total votes		207,365	100

2012 Indiana gubernatorial election
Party	Candidate	Votes	%	±%
Republican	Mike Pence / Sue Ellspermann	1,264,877	49.62%	−8.22%
Democratic	John Gregg / Vi Simpson	1,183,213	46.42%	+6.38%
Libertarian	Rupert Boneham / Brad Klopfenstein	101,028	3.96%	+1.84%
No party	Donnie Harold Harris / George Fish (write-in)	34	0%	—
Margin of victory		81,664	3.20%	−14.61%
Turnout		2,549,152	57.81%	−2.08%
Republican hold		Swing		

=== 2016 gubernatorial campaign ===
On April 30, 2015, Gregg launched his second campaign, which originally was to be a rematch against Gov. Pence, who was perceived as politically weakened after signing the Religious Freedom Restoration Act. Gregg entered the 2016 race for Governor before other Democrats announced their presumed candidacies, including Indiana state Sen. Karen Tallian and state superintendent of schools Glenda Ritz, who withdrew. In July, after Pence dropped out of the race to become Republican presidential nominee Donald Trump's vice presidential running mate in the 2016 presidential election, Lieutenant Governor Eric Holcomb ended his candidacy to retain his seat in order to seek the gubernatorial nomination. The Indiana State Republican Committee selected Holcomb to replace Pence as their gubernatorial nominee. Gregg was defeated by Holcomb in the general election for the governorship.

2016 Indiana gubernatorial election
Party	Candidate	Votes	%	±%
Republican	Eric Holcomb / Suzanne Crouch	1,397,396	51.38	+1.71%
Democratic	John R. Gregg / Christina Hale	1,235,503	45.42	−1.04%
Libertarian	Rex Bell / Karl (K-Tat) Tatgenhorst	87,025	3.20	−0.75%
Write-in	Jack Adam Adkins	41	0	—
Write-in	Christopher Stried	3	0	—
Plurality		161,893	5.96	+2.76%
Total votes		2,719,968	100	
Republican hold		Swing		

== Awards and honors ==
Gregg has been honored with a Hoosier Hero Award (1996). He received an honorary doctorate from Vincennes University in 2002. He is a four-time recipient of the Sagamore of the Wabash award (awarded by Governors Robert D. Orr, 1989; Evan Bayh, 1996; Frank O'Bannon, 2002; and Joe Kernan, 2003).

In 2002, Gregg was named "Public Official of the Year" in 2002 by Governing magazine.

== Books and other writings ==
Gregg's book, From Sandborn to the Statehouse, was published in 2008. He is writing a second book about growing up in a small town.

Gregg wrote at least one op-ed article, "Leave common construction wage law in place," in the Chicago Tribune on February 27, 2015.

== Radio show ==
Gregg hosted a radio call-in show in Vincennes and in Washington, Indiana. He hosted the early morning talk show, "Indiana Open Phones," on WIBC (FM), an Indianapolis radio station from 1999 to 2007. The forum covered topics from Indiana politics to folksy western Indiana cuisine.

== Television show ==
Starting in 2022, Gregg hosts a weekly television program on PBS entitled "On the Porch with John Gregg." The program is filmed at and produced by Vincennes PBS and features Indiana artists, craftspeople, musicians, historians and storytellers. The series is available on YouTube at "On the Porch with John Gregg"

== Personal life ==
Gregg has been married three times. He is married to Lisa Kelly. The couple wed in 2012, after the November election, and live in Sandborn, Indiana. Gregg and his second wife, Sherry (née Biddinger) Gregg Gilmore, met while at law school at Indiana University and married two years later in 1989. They were married for 16 years, divorced in 2006, and have two sons, John Blackwood Gregg and Hunter Gregg. Their children were both adults when Gregg first ran for governor in 2012. Gregg's first marriage was to Kim (née Reichman) Kirkwood in 1978 and it lasted one year.

He is a member of Sandborn First Christian Church. He is a member of the Sandborn Masonic Lodge #647, where he is a 33rd Degree Mason and past Master.

Gregg once pulled a man from a car wreck near Marco, Indiana, on Highway 67 and although the man lost his leg, the car was on fire, and Gregg's assistance on site was considered a possible life-saving action. A nurse traveling on the highway that Saturday then came to the Michigan man's assistance.

In 2004, Gregg announced he had been diagnosed with prostate cancer, as had his father before him. At age 49, he was treated and later pronounced clean of cancer.

== See also ==
- Indiana gubernatorial election, 2012
- Indiana gubernatorial election, 2016

Party political offices
Preceded by Jill Long Thompson	Democratic nominee for Governor of Indiana; 2012, 2016	Succeeded by Woody Myers
