= 2012 Indiana gubernatorial election =

- November 6, 2012
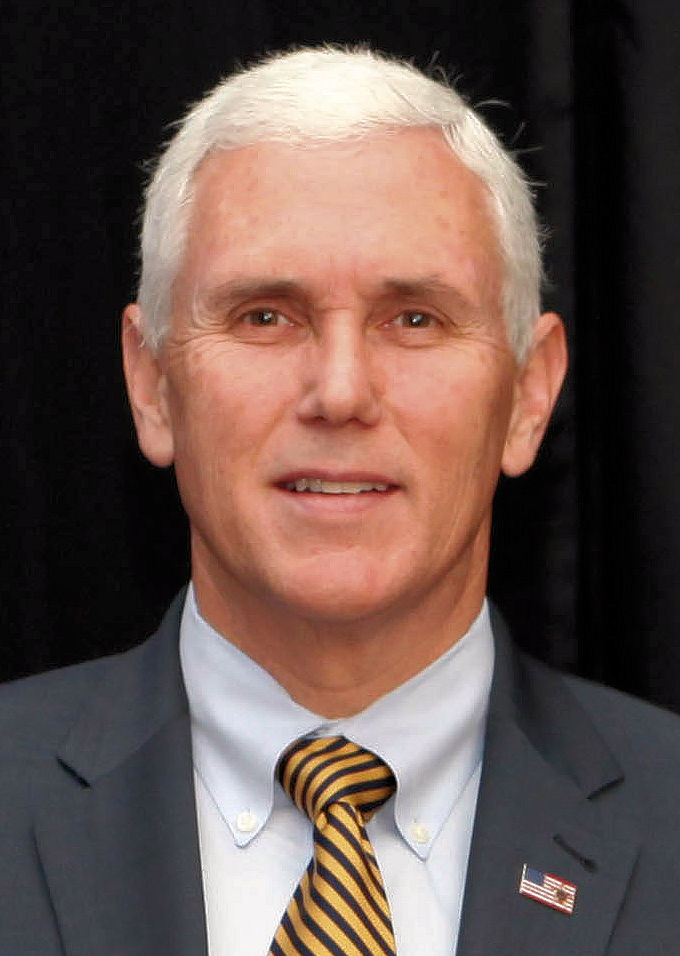

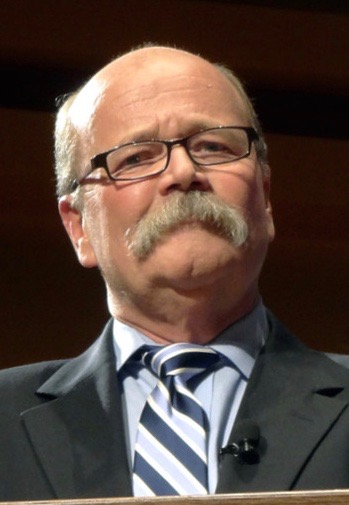
| Nominee | Mike Pence | John R. Gregg |
| Party | Republican | Democratic |
| Running mate | Sue Ellspermann | Vi Simpson |
| Popular vote | 1,275,424 | 1,200,016 |
| Percentage | 49.49% | 46.56% |
- Pence: 40–50% 50–60% 60–70% Gregg: 40–50% 50–60% 60–70%
Governor before election
Mitch Daniels
Republican
Elected Governor
Mike Pence
Republican

The 2012 Indiana gubernatorial election took place on November 6, 2012. Incumbent governor Mitch Daniels was term-limited and unable to seek a third term. The Republican candidate, Congressman Mike Pence; the Democratic candidate, former Speaker of the Indiana House of Representatives John R. Gregg; and the Libertarian candidate, youth mentor, small business owner and reality TV personality, Rupert Boneham, were all unopposed in their respective primaries or conventions, and contested the general election. This is the first open Indiana gubernatorial election since 1996 and the first gubernatorial election since 1972 without the incumbent governor or lieutenant governor as a nominee.

When the polls closed, the election was very close, and continued to stay close throughout the night. Gregg performed well in Marion County (Indianapolis) and Lake County (Gary), which were Democratic strongholds. Pence performed well in the Indianapolis suburbs and the Fort Wayne area. At 12:34 am EST, the Associated Press called the race for Pence. At 1:06 am, Gregg called Pence to concede, realizing there were not enough votes left to overtake him. Pence ultimately won the election and took office on January 14, 2013. This was the closest race for governor since 1960.

== Primaries ==
=== Democratic ===
- John R. Gregg, former speaker of the Indiana House of Representatives

=== Results ===
Democratic Indiana gubernatorial election primary in Indiana, 2012
| Party | Candidate | Votes | % |
|---|---|---|---|
| Democratic | John R. Gregg | 207,365 | 100 |
| Total votes | | 207,365 | 100 |

=== Libertarian ===
- Rupert Boneham, four-time contestant on Survivor and founder of Rupert's Kids. Boneham was nominated by delegates at his party's state convention.

== General election ==
=== Candidates ===
- Rupert Boneham (Libertarian), four-time contestant on Survivor and founder of Rupert's Kids

- Running mate: Brad Klopfenstein, former executive director of the Libertarian Party of Indiana

- John Gregg (Democratic), former speaker of the Indiana House of Representatives

- Running mate: Vi Simpson, state senate minority leader

- Donnie Harold Harris (Public Party) (write-in)

- Running mate: George Fish

- Mike Pence (Republican), U.S. representative

- Running mate: Sue Ellspermann, state representative

=== Debates ===
The Indiana Debate Commission organized three televised debates between Indiana Gubernatorial candidates Republican Mike Pence, Democrat John R. Gregg and Libertarian Rupert Boneham.

Debate schedule
The first debate was held on Wednesday, October 10, 2012, at the Zionsville Performing Arts Center in Zionsville, Indiana and was moderated by former Indianapolis Star editor Dennis Ryerson.

- Complete video of debate, October 10, 2012 - C-SPAN

The second debate was held on Wednesday, October 17, 2012, at the DeBartolo Performing Arts Center in South Bend, Indiana and was moderated by Indiana Fiscal Policy Institute president John Ketzenberger.

- Complete video of debate, October 17, 2012 - C-SPAN

The third debate was held on Thursday, October 25, 2012, at the WFWA PBS 39 studio in Fort Wayne, Indiana and was moderated by DePauw University Executive Director of Media Relations Ken Owen.

- Complete video of debate, October 25, 2012 - YouTube

=== Predictions ===
| Source | Ranking | As of |
|---|---|---|
| The Cook Political Report | Likely R | November 1, 2012 |
| Sabato's Crystal Ball | Likely R | November 5, 2012 |
| Rothenberg Political Report | Likely R | November 2, 2012 |
| Real Clear Politics | Likely R | November 5, 2012 |

=== Polling ===
| Poll source | Date(s) administered | Sample size | Margin of error | Mike Pence (R) | John R. Gregg (D) | Rupert Boneham (L) | Other | Undecided |
|---|---|---|---|---|---|---|---|---|
| Howey Politics/DePauw | October 28–30, 2012 | 800 | ± 3.5% | 47% | 40% | 5% | — | — |
| Benenson Strategy Group | October 18–21, 2012 | 701 | ± 3.7% | 44% | 38% | 6% | — | 12% |
| YouGov | October 4–11, 2012 | 470 | ± 5.6% | 49% | 38% | — | — | 13% |
| Howey Politics/DePauw University | September 19–23, 2012 | 800 | ± 3.5% | 47% | 34% | 5% | — | 14% |
| Market Research Insight | August 6–9, 2012 | 600 | ± 4% | 50% | 32% | 3% | — | 15% |
| Market Research Insight | March 26–27, 2012 | 503 | ± 4.5% | 44% | 31% | 5% | — | 20% |

=== Results ===
State senate district results

Indiana gubernatorial election, 2012
| Party | Candidate | Votes | % | ±% |
|---|---|---|---|---|
| Republican | Mike Pence/Sue Ellspermann | 1,275,424 | 49.49% | −8.35% |
| Democratic | John R. Gregg/Vi Simpson | 1,200,016 | 46.56% | +6.52% |
| Libertarian | Rupert Boneham | 101,868 | 3.95% | +1.83% |
| Independent | Donnie Harold Harris (write-in) | 21 | 0.00% | N/A |
| Total votes | | 2,577,329 | 100.0% | N/A |
| Republican hold | | | | |

==== By county ====
| | Mike Pence Republican | | John R. Gregg Democratic | | Rupert Boneham Libertarian | | Margin | | Total |
| County | Votes | % | Votes | % | Votes | % | Votes | % | Votes |
|---|---|---|---|---|---|---|---|---|---|
| Adams | 8,108 | 62.60% | 4,515 | 34.86% | 329 | 2.54% | 3,593 | 27.74% | 12,952 |
| Allen | 78,657 | 54.69% | 61,365 | 42.67% | 3,790 | 2.64% | 17,292 | 12.02% | 143,812 |
| Bartholomew | 17,414 | 59.74% | 10,607 | 36.39% | 1,130 | 3.88% | 6,807 | 23.35% | 29,151 |
| Benton | 1,944 | 54.81% | 1,374 | 38.74% | 229 | 6.46% | 570 | 16.07% | 3,547 |
| Blackford | 2,432 | 52.23% | 2,012 | 43.21% | 212 | 4.55% | 420 | 9.02% | 4,656 |
| Boone | 17,415 | 56.43% | 8,709 | 31.59% | 1,019 | 3.70% | 8,706 | 31.58% | 27,565 |
| Brown | 3,773 | 40.30% | 3,407 | 44.52% | 455 | 5.95% | 366 | 4.78% | 7,653 |
| Carroll | 4,164 | 53.62% | 3,132 | 40.33% | 470 | 6.05% | 1,032 | 13.29% | 7,766 |
| Cass | 7,104 | 50.19% | 6,246 | 44.13% | 803 | 5.67% | 858 | 6.06% | 14,153 |
| Clark | 24,322 | 52.90% | 20,108 | 43.73% | 1,548 | 3.37% | 4,214 | 9.17% | 45,978 |
| Clay | 5,525 | 50.98% | 4,747 | 43.80% | 565 | 5.21% | 778 | 7.18% | 10,837 |
| Clinton | 5,411 | 54.93% | 3,875 | 39.34% | 565 | 5.74% | 1,536 | 15.59% | 9,851 |
| Crawford | 2,096 | 46.63% | 2,266 | 50.41% | 133 | 2.96% | -170 | -3.78% | 4,495 |
| Daviess | 5,386 | 53.52% | 4,396 | 43.68% | 281 | 2.79% | 990 | 9.84% | 10,063 |
| Dearborn | 14,353 | 66.64% | 6,210 | 28.83% | 974 | 4.52% | 8,143 | 37.81% | 21,537 |
| Decatur | 6,479 | 63.04% | 3,182 | 30.96% | 616 | 5.99% | 3,297 | 32.08% | 10,277 |
| DeKalb | 9,583 | 59.89% | 5,847 | 36.54% | 571 | 3.57% | 3,736 | 23.35% | 16,001 |
| Delaware | 19,978 | 45.56% | 21,901 | 49.95% | 1,967 | 4.49% | -1,923 | -4.39% | 43,846 |
| Dubois | 10,931 | 59.64% | 6,958 | 37.97% | 438 | 2.39% | 3,973 | 21.68% | 18,327 |
| Elkhart | 38,969 | 57.91% | 26,340 | 39.15% | 1,978 | 2.94% | 12,629 | 18.77% | 67,287 |
| Fayette | 4,573 | 52.64% | 3,662 | 42.15% | 452 | 5.20% | 911 | 10.49% | 8,687 |
| Floyd | 18,982 | 54.74% | 14,738 | 42.50% | 954 | 2.75% | 4,244 | 12.24% | 34,674 |
| Fountain | 3,760 | 53.27% | 2,884 | 40.86% | 414 | 5.87% | 876 | 12.41% | 7,058 |
| Franklin | 6,967 | 67.89% | 2,858 | 27.84% | 439 | 4.28% | 4,109 | 40.03% | 10,264 |
| Fulton | 4,532 | 56.03% | 3,194 | 39.49% | 362 | 4.48% | 1,338 | 16.54% | 8,088 |
| Gibson | 7,731 | 52.86% | 6,508 | 44.50% | 387 | 2.65% | 1,223 | 8.36% | 14,626 |
| Grant | 13,824 | 55.15% | 10,313 | 41.14% | 931 | 3.71% | 3,511 | 14.01% | 25,068 |
| Greene | 5,486 | 41.74% | 7,307 | 55.60% | 350 | 2.66% | -1,821 | -13.86% | 13,143 |
| Hamilton | 88,062 | 65.19% | 41,761 | 30.91% | 5,265 | 3.90% | 46,301 | 34.27% | 135,088 |
| Hancock | 20,288 | 62.17% | 10,464 | 32.07% | 1,879 | 5.76% | 9,824 | 30.11% | 32,631 |
| Harrison | 9,987 | 57.07% | 6,959 | 39.77% | 554 | 3.17% | 3,028 | 17.30% | 17,500 |
| Hendricks | 40,242 | 61.33% | 22,115 | 33.70% | 3,257 | 4.96% | 18,127 | 27.63% | 65,614 |
| Henry | 9,437 | 49.63% | 8,277 | 43.53% | 1,301 | 6.84% | 1,160 | 6.10% | 19,015 |
| Howard | 17,768 | 49.24% | 16,515 | 45.77% | 1,802 | 4.99% | 1,253 | 3.47% | 36,085 |
| Huntington | 9,623 | 62.68% | 5,212 | 33.95% | 517 | 3.37% | 4,411 | 28.73% | 15,352 |
| Jackson | 9,613 | 57.78% | 6,377 | 38.33% | 648 | 3.89% | 3,236 | 19.45% | 16,638 |
| Jasper | 6,987 | 56.10% | 5,055 | 40.59% | 412 | 3.31% | 1,932 | 15.51% | 12,454 |
| Jay | 4,324 | 55.05% | 3,183 | 40.52% | 348 | 4.43% | 1,141 | 14.53% | 7,855 |
| Jefferson | 6,715 | 52.76% | 5,610 | 44.08% | 403 | 3.17% | 1,105 | 8.68% | 12,728 |
| Jennings | 5,648 | 55.76% | 4,023 | 39.72% | 458 | 4.52% | 1,625 | 16.04% | 10,129 |
| Johnson | 35,805 | 62.67% | 18,097 | 31.68% | 3,231 | 5.66% | 17,708 | 30.99% | 57,133 |
| Knox | 5,031 | 33.11% | 9,911 | 65.23% | 253 | 1.67% | -4,880 | -32.12% | 15,195 |
| Kosciusko | 20,527 | 69.01% | 8,300 | 27.90% | 919 | 3.09% | 12,227 | 41.10% | 29,746 |
| LaGrange | 5,653 | 61.01% | 3,257 | 35.15% | 355 | 3.83% | 2,396 | 25.86% | 9,265 |
| Lake | 55,750 | 30.70% | 122,251 | 67.32% | 3,584 | 1.97% | -66,501 | -36.62% | 181,585 |
| LaPorte | 16,159 | 38.48% | 24,186 | 57.59% | 1,653 | 3.94% | -8,027 | -19.11% | 41,998 |
| Lawrence | 10,094 | 57.14% | 6,830 | 38.67% | 740 | 4.19% | 3,264 | 18.48% | 17,664 |
| Madison | 24,048 | 46.06% | 25,392 | 48.64% | 2,765 | 5.30% | -1,344 | -2.57% | 52,205 |
| Marion | 129,125 | 36.27% | 209,325 | 58.80% | 17,518 | 4.92% | -80,200 | -22.53% | 355,968 |
| Marshall | 9,900 | 56.22% | 7,112 | 40.39% | 598 | 3.40% | 2,788 | 15.83% | 17,610 |
| Martin | 2,471 | 52.36% | 2,050 | 43.44% | 198 | 4.20% | 421 | 8.92% | 4,719 |
| Miami | 6,882 | 54.48% | 4,982 | 39.28% | 767 | 6.07% | 1,900 | 15.04% | 12,631 |
| Monroe | 14,530 | 36.76% | 22,981 | 58.14% | 2,019 | 5.11% | -8,451 | -21.38% | 39,530 |
| Montgomery | 8,105 | 56.41% | 5,482 | 38.16% | 780 | 5.43% | 2,623 | 18.26% | 14,367 |
| Morgan | 17,079 | 60.81% | 9,295 | 33.10% | 1,711 | 6.09% | 7,784 | 27.72% | 28,085 |
| Newton | 3,015 | 54.28% | 2,287 | 41.17% | 253 | 4.55% | 728 | 13.11% | 5,555 |
| Noble | 9,405 | 58.78% | 6,047 | 37.80% | 547 | 3.42% | 3,358 | 20.99% | 15,999 |
| Ohio | 1,554 | 56.57% | 1,084 | 39.46% | 109 | 3.97% | 470 | 17.11% | 2,747 |
| Orange | 4,112 | 53.85% | 3,273 | 42.86% | 251 | 3.29% | 839 | 10.99% | 7,636 |
| Owen | 4,164 | 51.43% | 3,456 | 42.69% | 476 | 5.88% | 708 | 8.75% | 8,096 |
| Parke | 3,366 | 51.78% | 2,818 | 43.35% | 316 | 4.86% | 548 | 8.43% | 6,500 |
| Perry | 3,132 | 40.04% | 4,523 | 57.82% | 168 | 2.15% | -1,391 | -17.78% | 7,823 |
| Pike | 2,661 | 45.18% | 3,066 | 52.05% | 163 | 2.77% | -405 | -6.88% | 5,890 |
| Porter | 29,321 | 41.06% | 39,893 | 55.86% | 2,198 | 3.08% | -10,572 | -14.80% | 71,412 |
| Posey | 6,455 | 53.30% | 5,340 | 44.10% | 315 | 2.60% | 1,115 | 9.21% | 12,110 |
| Pulaski | 2,809 | 53.88% | 2,189 | 41.99% | 215 | 4.12% | 620 | 11.89% | 5,213 |
| Putnam | 7,550 | 55.03% | 5,307 | 38.68% | 864 | 6.30% | 2,243 | 16.35% | 13,721 |
| Randolph | 5,708 | 56.51% | 3,939 | 39.00% | 454 | 4.49% | 1,769 | 17.51% | 10,101 |
| Ripley | 7,018 | 64.99% | 3,224 | 29.85% | 557 | 5.16% | 3,794 | 35.13% | 10,799 |
| Rush | 4,120 | 59.20% | 2,370 | 34.05% | 470 | 6.75% | 1,750 | 25.14% | 6,960 |
| St. Joseph | 47,208 | 43.11% | 59,410 | 54.25% | 2,897 | 2.65% | -12,202 | -11.14% | 109,515 |
| Scott | 4,069 | 47.26% | 4,287 | 49.79% | 254 | 2.95% | -218 | -2.53% | 8,610 |
| Shelby | 9,643 | 57.70% | 5,994 | 35.87% | 1,084 | 6.49% | 3,649 | 21.83% | 16,712 |
| Spencer | 5,059 | 52.38% | 4,385 | 45.40% | 215 | 2.23% | 674 | 6.98% | 9,659 |
| Starke | 3,828 | 45.27% | 4,291 | 50.75% | 337 | 3.99% | -463 | -5.48% | 8,456 |
| Steuben | 7,772 | 57.19% | 5,308 | 39.06% | 509 | 3.75% | 2,464 | 18.13% | 13,589 |
| Sullivan | 2,948 | 35.33% | 5,179 | 62.06% | 218 | 2.61% | -2,231 | -26.73% | 8,345 |
| Switzerland | 1,666 | 50.73% | 1,489 | 45.34% | 129 | 3.93% | 177 | 5.39% | 3,284 |
| Tippecanoe | 25,709 | 45.70% | 27,615 | 49.09% | 2,929 | 5.21% | -1,906 | -3.39% | 56,253 |
| Tipton | 4,136 | 56.74% | 2,572 | 35.29% | 401 | 5.50% | 1,564 | 21.46% | 7,289 |
| Union | 1,963 | 64.40% | 940 | 30.84% | 145 | 4.76% | 1,023 | 33.56% | 3,048 |
| Vanderburgh | 36,459 | 51.16% | 32,830 | 46.07% | 1,969 | 2.76% | 3,629 | 5.09% | 71,258 |
| Vermillion | 2,617 | 39.76% | 3,639 | 55.29% | 326 | 4.95% | -1,022 | -15.53% | 6,582 |
| Vigo | 15,013 | 37.98% | 22,988 | 58.15% | 1,528 | 3.87% | -7,975 | -20.18% | 39,529 |
| Wabash | 7,524 | 60.41% | 4,459 | 35.80% | 471 | 3.78% | 3,065 | 24.61% | 12,454 |
| Warren | 2,013 | 53.25% | 1,579 | 41.77% | 188 | 4.97% | 434 | 11.48% | 3,780 |
| Warrick | 13,654 | 56.25% | 10,030 | 41.32% | 588 | 2.42% | 3,624 | 14.93% | 24,272 |
| Washington | 6,129 | 57.71% | 4,108 | 38.68% | 383 | 3.61% | 2,021 | 19.03% | 10,620 |
| Wayne | 13,891 | 54.66% | 10,261 | 40.38% | 1,262 | 4.97% | 3,630 | 14.28% | 25,414 |
| Wells | 8,517 | 66.18% | 3,997 | 31.06% | 355 | 2.76% | 4,520 | 35.12% | 12,869 |
| White | 5,032 | 50.93% | 4,279 | 43.31% | 570 | 5.77% | 753 | 7.62% | 9,881 |
| Whitley | 9,084 | 61.44% | 5,209 | 35.23% | 493 | 3.33% | 3,875 | 26.21% | 14,786 |

Counties that flipped from Republican to Democratic

- Delaware (largest city: Muncie)
- Greene (largest city: Linton)
- Madison (largest city: Anderson)
- Marion (largest city: Indianapolis)
- Scott (largest city: Scottsburg)
- Tippecanoe (largest city: Lafayette)
- Vigo (largest city: Terre Haute)

Counties that flipped from Democratic to Republican

- Switzerland (largest city: Vevay)

==== By congressional district ====
Pence won six of nine congressional districts; while Gregg won three, including one, the 8th district, that elected a Republican.

| District | Pence | Gregg | Representative |
|---|---|---|---|
| 1st | 33.61% | 63.98% | Pete Visclosky |
| 2nd | 50.63% | 46.15% | Joe Donnelly (112th Congress) |
| 2nd | 50.63% | 46.15% | Jackie Walorski (113th Congress) |
| 3rd | 58.24% | 38.77% | Marlin Stutzman |
| 4th | 53.82% | 40.87% | Todd Rokita |
| 5th | 55.34% | 40.44% | Dan Burton (112th Congress) |
| 5th | 55.34% | 40.44% | Susan Brooks (113th Congress) |
| 6th | 56.56% | 38.49% | Mike Pence (112th Congress) |
| 6th | 56.56% | 38.49% | Luke Messer (113th Congress) |
| 7th | 33.07% | 61.73% | André Carson |
| 8th | 48.28% | 48.69% | Larry Bucshon |
| 9th | 53.08% | 42.70% | Todd Young |
