= 2011 Indiana legislative walkouts =

- Part of 2011 United States public employee protests
- Date: February 22, 2011 –March 28, 2011
- Location: Indiana
- Methods: Legislative walkout
- Status: over

The 2011 Legislative Walkout in Indiana occurred during February and March when the Democratic minority, inspired by the 2011 Wisconsin protests, fled the state to deny the Indiana House of Representatives quorum needed to pass a controversial right-to-work bill, which would have removed the legal requirement that employees pay union dues. The walkout lasted nearly six weeks, and the majority responded by fining the missing members and withholding their pay. The walkout ended after the majority agreed to table three bills, including the one that sparked the walkout, from the agenda.

== Walkout ==
On February 22, 2011, Democratic legislators in the Indiana House of Representatives staged a legislative walkout. Republican legislators attempted to pass a right to work bill in the Indiana House of Representatives. The bill would have made it illegal for employees to be required to join a workers union. Republicans argued that it would help the state attract new employers. Unable to prevent the measure from passing, all but three Democratic legislators fled the state to neighboring Illinois to deny the body quorum while several hundred protesters staged demonstrations at the capital.

Minority walkouts are common in Indiana, but are typically short in duration. They have occurred as recently as 2005, and as long ago as Civil War era, when at the request of Governor Oliver P. Morton, Republicans fled the capitol to prevent anti-war and pro-Confederate legislation from passing. Republicans last staged a walkout in 2001 to deny quorum on statewide legislative redistricting, and Democrats did the same in 1991.

Governor Mitch Daniels stated that while he supported the legislation, he believed the Republican lawmakers should drop the bill because it was not part of their election platform and deserved a period of public debate. Republicans subsequently dropped the bill, but the Democratic lawmakers still refused to return to the capital, demanding additional bills be tabled, including a bill to create a statewide school voucher program. Their refusal to return left the Indiana General Assembly unable to pass any legislation. Daniels was interviewed in February, 2011, about the similar 2011 Wisconsin labor protests in Madison. He declined to authorize the state police to compel the legislators to return. While supporting the Wisconsin Republicans, he stated that in Indiana "we're not in quite the same position or advocating quite the same things they are up in Madison."

The minority leader, Patrick Bauer, returned to the statehouse March 3 to negotiate the return of the minority members, detailing the list of bills they wanted removed from the agenda. House Speaker Brian Bosma rejected the request, and the House passed a resolution fining the missing members $250 daily until their return; this could exceed the representatives' entire annual salary if they remained away from the capital more than 90 days. On March 9, as it became apparent the Democrats would not return and because a state budget had not yet been approved, an angry Governor Daniels told the minority he would call a special session and keep the General Assembly in session until the end of the year—meaning Democrats could face fines of nearly $100,000 each. On March 13, Speaker Bosma continued negotiation with the minority leader by phone, saying he believed the standoff would soon come to an end.

In addition to the financial pressure on the minority, their walkout was also jeopardizing their chance to impact the statewide Congressional redistricting. If a redistricting plan is not approved by the end of the regular session on April 29, the duty falls to a five-member commission made up of various predetermined elected officials—all of whom are Republican.

On March 28, Bosma and Bauer finally negotiated an end to the walkout. Bosma agreed that the majority would remove three bills of twelve bills the minority opposed, including the one that sparked the walkout, from the legislative calendar. The statewide school voucher bill was not removed. Bosma called the concession minor, while Bauer said the walkout achieved its aim of exposing the Republican agenda to the state. The walkout lasted nearly six weeks and the missing members were fined about $3500 each. Governor Daniels lamented the lost time in the legislative session, but was glad the minority finally returned.

== Aftermath ==
After the walkout, Republican legislators introduced a bill that would make legislative walkouts a criminal offense. A similar 1976 law had been ruled unconstitutional by the state courts previously.
