= B. Patrick Bauer =

American politician from Indiana

Speaker of the Indiana House of Representatives
- In office January 2007 – January 2011
- Preceded by: Brian Bosma
- Succeeded by: Brian Bosma
- In office January 2003 – January 2005
- Preceded by: John R. Gregg
- Succeeded by: Brian Bosma

Member of the Indiana House of Representatives from the 6th district
- In office November 4, 1970 – November 4, 2020
- Preceded by: Redistricted
- Succeeded by: Maureen Bauer

Personal details
- Born: May 25, 1944 (age 82) La Porte, Indiana, U.S.
- Party: Democratic
- Spouse: Karen Bauer
- Education: University of Notre Dame (BA); Indiana University (MA)
- Profession: Educator

B. Patrick Bauer (born May 25, 1944) is an American politician who served as Speaker of the Indiana House of Representatives from 2003 to 2005 and 2007 to 2011. A Democratic member of the Indiana House of Representatives, he has represented the 6th House District since 1970. His district consists primarily of the city of South Bend in St. Joseph County in northern Indiana. On January 28, 2020, Bauer announced that he would not be running for reelection.

== Early life ==
=== Education and Family ===
B. Patrick (Pat) Bauer was born in La Porte, Indiana to Helene and Burnie Bauer. His mother was a professor of speech and drama at Saint Mary's College (Indiana). His father was a small business owner and served as a State Representative and State Senator, first elected in 1964. Here his father authored some of the first environmental legislation. Pat Bauer attended St. Joseph High School, followed by the University of Notre Dame in South Bend, Indiana, where he received a Bachelor of Arts in Communication Studies. He completed a Master of Arts in Education with a concentration in English from Indiana University. Additionally, he completed a post masters certification in School Administration. Pat Bauer met his wife, Karen, while teaching in the South Bend Community School Corporation. They currently reside in South Bend, IN and have three adult children, Bart, Megan and Maureen, and four grandsons.

=== Career ===
Bauer worked for the South Bend Community School Corporation for 33 years including 17 years as an English teacher and 16 as an administrator as the Assistant to the Superintendent for Special Programs. He then moved to serve as the Vice President of External Partnerships for Ivy Tech Community College of Indiana, of which he has since retired in 2016. In this role, he created program relationships with businesses across Indiana, and created articulation agreements with four-year universities.

He is currently a member of the advisory board for Indiana University South Bend (IUSB) and is a member of the Independent College Board. Bauer also serves on the board for the Urban Enterprise Association of South Bend, Incorporated.

Bauer was first elected to the Indiana House of Representatives in 1970. He is the longest serving member of the Indiana House of Representatives, and the first member in The Indiana General Assembly to serve for 50 years. He was re-elected to office in 2018, and completed his 25th and final term on November 4, 2020.

== Legislative career ==
=== Chairman of The House Ways and Means Committee ===
Rep. Bauer held the position of Chairman of the House Ways and Means Committee for multiple years, including twice when the House was split 50–50 between Democrats and Republicans. In this role, he gained recognition as one of the leading fiscal experts in Indiana state government, and influenced negotiations of the state budget.

=== Indiana Speaker of the House ===
Bauer was first nominated as Speaker of the House of Representatives during the 2003 and 2004 sessions with a 51–49 majority in The House. Following the 2003 session, he was named as the Indiana Chamber's Co-Government Leader of the Year for his bipartisan work with Minority Leader Brian Bosma.

Bauer was re-elected to serve as Speaker of the House of Representatives of Indiana on November 7, 2006. The Speaker of the House presides over the Indiana House of Representatives and sets the legislative agenda. The Speaker also assigns other members of the House of Representatives to their respective committees. His term expired at the end of the 2010 session of the Indiana General Assembly.

=== Indiana House of Representatives Minority Leader ===
Following the election of 2010, Rep. Bauer became the Minority Leader of the Indiana House of Representatives for the 2011 Legislative session.

On February 2, 2011, Rep. Bauer led the 2011 Indiana legislative walkouts of 36 Democratic representatives over a right-to-work bill. The bill (House Bill 1468) aimed to prevent union dues from being taken from non-union workers in organized businesses. It was a move viewed by Democrats as anti-union, and they believed it would result in lower employee wages and benefits. Supporters of the bill believed it would attract more businesses to the state.

Democratic legislators fled the state to stall a vote on the bill by denying a two-thirds quorum necessary to take action and move the bill to a vote. While outside the House Chamber, thousands of union workers marched to the Indiana Statehouse in protest of the bill.

On March 28, 2011, after negotiations and compromising on a number of issues, including postponing the controversial right-to-work law, the walk out ended, and Democrats returned to the statehouse.

While some of the Democratic demands were met, including the removal of three out of the twelve bills the minority opposed, a total of twenty-three bills "timed-out" and were killed by the right-to-work dispute, and Democratic lawmakers accrued up to $3,500 in fines, imposed by the House Speaker and Governor as a means to get the legislators to return to the House chamber.

On the first day of the 2012 legislative session, Rep. Bauer led a legislative boycott of the house floor to again prevent a vote on the right-to-work bill (House Bill 1001). His demands were that Speaker Brian Bosma should hold additional hearings and statewide public meetings on the bill as a solution to end the walk out.

The effort failed, and on January 25, 2012, the bill passed (55 to 41) to a Republican controlled House. On February 1, 2012, it was passed by the Republican controlled senate (28 to 22) and signed by governor Mitch Daniels, making Indiana the 23rd state to pass a right-to-work law, and one of the first in the Midwest, considered to be the manufacturing belt of the country. Similar legislation was passed in Indiana in 1957 but later repealed in 1965.

Under new leadership entering the 2012 elections, Indiana House Democrats went from a minority of 60–40 to a super minority of 69–31 which does not require a quorum to conduct House business or votes.

On January 28, 2020, Bauer announced that he would not be running for reelection in 2020, completing 50 years in the Indiana House of Representatives.

== Legislation ==
=== 1970s Phosphate Ban ===
In Rep. Bauer's first term as a State Representative, he introduced HB 1551 during the 1971 legislative session. The bill made it unlawful to “use, sell or otherwise dispose of” phosphate detergents after January 1, 1973, due to the harmful effects it posed to our water supply, including The Great Lakes. The bill was signed into law by Governor Whitcomb in April 1971, which made Indiana the first state to pass a phosphates in detergent ban. The bill won the support of the League of Women Voters who have been fighting pollution of The Great Lakes since the 1950s.

=== Felony Arrest DNA Sampling Law ===
Rep. Bauer played an important role in the passage of the Indiana Felony Arrest DNA Sampling Law SB322 to help solve crimes. As of 2010, all states participate in the national DNA database, Combined DNA Index System CODIS, under a law known nationally as Katie's Law. As of the time the Indiana legislation was introduced in 2015, 28 states had passed individual state legislation to require the collection of a DNA sample by an officer at the time a felony suspect is booked. Those states then store the DNA information into the CODIS database. Building a larger DNA database has shown to reduce crime rates, especially in cases of murder, rape, assault and vehicle theft.

A study which followed eight convicted felons determined that if a DNA sample been taken during each arrest, 53 rapes and murders would have been prevented.

A study at the University of Virginia showed for every $30 invested in DNA collection, states saved $27,000 in taxpayer money.

In 2013, the Supreme Court of the United States ruled that a DNA cheek swab sample upon felony arrest is “a reasonable and legitimate police booking procedure,” much like fingerprinting or photographing.

The legislation also has the benefit of exonerating people who have been falsely accused of crimes.

It look three attempts to bring the bill to a vote, and was successfully passed in 2017 and went into effect January 1, 2018 with Indiana being the 31st state to adopt this legislation. The law received praise from the Indiana Prosecuting Attorneys Council.

=== Microbead Ban ===
Rep. Bauer is also responsible for enacting legislation to ban the sale of products containing plastic micro beads in the state of Indiana. These micro was products are small enough to pass through water treatment systems, and have been found in the Great Lakes at high levels. The plastics are often consumed by fish, and have the potential to be passed onto humans or other animals. The bill proposes use of biodegradable products that do not pollute our water ways. The bill was signed into law by Gov. Mike Pence in April 2015 as House Enrolled Act with the first phase out of plastic products to begin in July of the same year. The legislation received support from Personal Care Products Council, Alliance for the Great Lakes, and other environmental groups.

=== School Bus Safety ===
Following a 2018 tragedy in Northern Indiana, involving a motor vehicle striking and killing three children and injuring one child while exiting a school bus, Rep. Bauer took action by co-sponsoring legislation to impose stricter penalties for stopped bus violations, and increasing school bus safety. Rep. Bauer originally sponsored HB1564 HB1564 which would have prevented public school bus drivers from loading or unloading a student at a location which requires the student to cross a roadway. While this bill did not leave House Committee, language was added to Senate Enrolled Act 2 which limited the number of bus drops offs that require a child to cross lanes of traffic on highways and high speed roadways. Rep. Bauer co-sponsored the bill, and it was signed into law in 2019 by Governor Holcomb.

=== Preserving Indiana's Agriculture Land ===
In support of Indiana's agricultural industry, Rep. Bauer sponsored HB1165, which aims to direct the Indiana State Department of Agriculture (ISDA) to create a program to allow farmers to preserve their agricultural land through agriculture conservation easements, and prevent it from being developed for industrial use or turned into subdivisions. It was reported by The American Farmland Trust that Indiana lost 500,000 acres of fertile farm land to development in the past 30 years. Indiana ranks upon the top three agricultural states in the nation, and this is an attempt to develop land other than fertile soils, and prevent Indiana farm land from disappearing.

The bill is currently assigned to an Interim Study Committee on Agriculture and Natural Resources for further research.

== Committee Membership ==
Rep. Bauer currently serves as the ranking minority member on the Judiciary Committee, and is a member of the Environmental Affairs Committee and the Insurance Committee.

== Awards and recognition ==
In his tenure as a legislator, Rep. Bauer has received a number of awards for legislative excellence at both the state and national level including:

- 2017 Legislative Excellence Award – Indiana Prosecuting Attorneys Council;
- 2003 Government Leader of the Year - Indiana Chamber of Commerce;
- 2001 Welsh-Bowen Distinguished Public Official Award - Hoosiers for Higher Education
