= Broden =

Broden is a surname. Notable people with the surname include:

- Anita Brodén (born 1948), Swedish politician
- Anne Marie Brodén (born 1956), Swedish politician
- Connie Broden (1932–2013), Canadian ice hockey player
- Elizabeth Broden, Mexican beauty pageant winner
- Joakim Brodén (born 1980), Swedish artist
- John Broden (born 1965), American politician
- Mats Brodén, Swedish artist
- Stephen Broden, American politician
- Tyrone Broden (born 2001), American football player
