= Joe Taylor (politician) =

American former politician

Member of the Indiana House of Representatives from the 7th district
- In office 2017–2018
- Preceded by: David L. Niezgodski
- Succeeded by: Ross Deal

Personal details
- Party: Democratic

Joe Taylor is an American politician. He served as a Democratic member for the 7th district of the Indiana House of Representatives.

In 2017, Taylor was elected for the 7th district of the Indiana House of Representatives. He left office in 2018 to work for the United Auto Workers union.
