= David L. Niezgodski =

American politician from Indiana (born 1960)

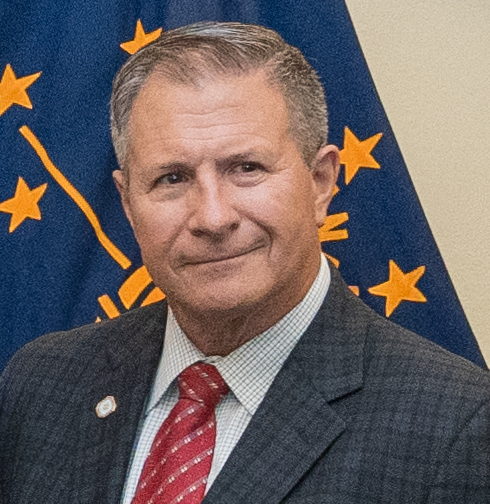

Member of the Indiana Senate from the 10th district
- Incumbent
- Assumed office November 9, 2016
- Preceded by: John Broden

Member of the Indiana House of Representatives from the 7th district
- In office November 8, 2006 – November 9, 2016
- Preceded by: Thomas S. Kromkowski
- Succeeded by: Joe Taylor

Personal details
- Born: August 18, 1960 (age 66) South Bend, Indiana, U.S.
- Party: Democratic
- Occupation: Niezgodski Plumbing, Inc.

David L. Niezgodski (born August 18, 1960) is a Democratic member of the Indiana Senate from the 10th district since 2016. He previously served in the Indiana House of Representatives, representing the 7th District from 2006 to 2016.

== Sexual harassment allegation ==
On April 12, 2024, Redress South Bend first reported the allegations that were then later reported by The Indianapolis Star and the South Bend Tribune, published a story outlining sexual harassment allegations dating back to 2017. The allegations stem from a former employee at Niezgodski's business, Niezgodski Plumbing. Niezgodski repeatedly called and texted the former employee saying he loved her and telling her not to quit. Additionally, he entered the former employee's home uninvited. Niezgodski's company settled with the former employee for $8,000 on the condition that neither Niezgodski or the accuser could publicly discuss the case.

== Personal life ==
Niezgodski is currently married to Shiela Niezgodski, with whom he had an affair with effectively ending his marriage to Diane (Honchell). In 2019, his current spouse, Sheila Niezgodski was elected as a Democrat to South Bend's Common Council, representing the 6th District.
