= Matt Lehman =

Matt Lehman may refer to:

- Matt Lehman (Indiana politician) Majority Leader of the Indiana House of Representatives, Member of the Indiana House of Representatives from the 79th district.
- Matt Lehman (Kentucky politician) (Born 1977), Member of the Kentucky House of Representatives from the 67th district.
