= List of speakers of the Indiana House of Representatives =

Speaker of the Indiana House of Representatives
- Seal of Indiana

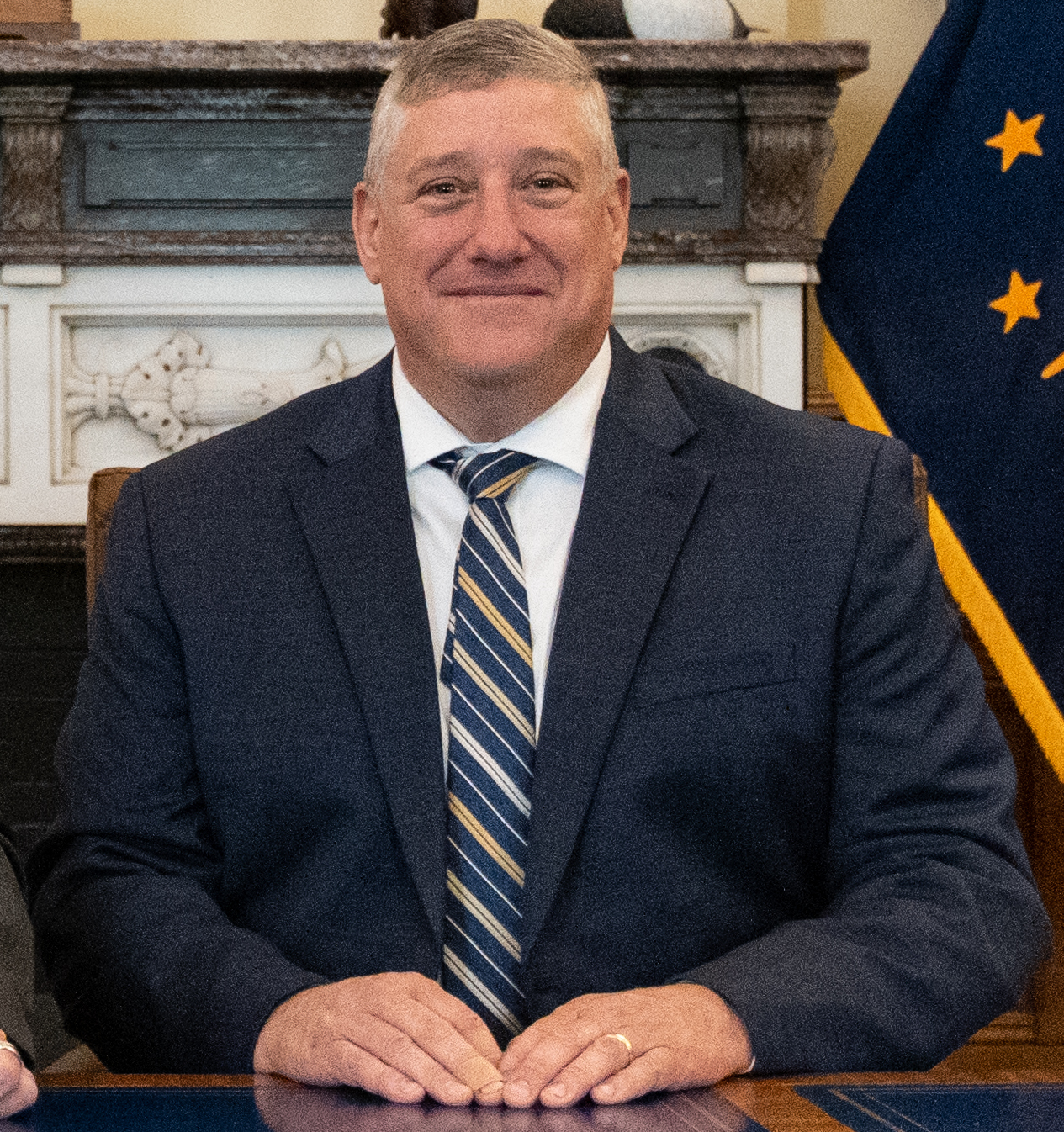
- Incumbent; Ben Smaltz since November 17, 2026
- Style: The Honorable
- Appointer: Elected by the Indiana House of Representatives
- Inaugural holder: Isaac Newton Blackford
- Succession: Second

The speaker of the Indiana State House of Representatives is the highest official in the Indiana House of Representatives, customarily elected from the ranks of the majority party. As in most Anglophone countries and provinces, the speaker presides over the lower house of the legislature.

The current Speaker of the Indiana House of Representatives is Ben Smaltz.

== List of speakers of the Indiana House of Representatives ==
Speakers of the Indiana House of Representatives
Assembly	Term	Name	Party	District
1st	November 4, 1816 – December 1, 1817	Isaac Newton Blackford	Nonpartisan	Knox
2nd	December 1, 1817 – December 7, 1818	Amos Lane	Nonpartisan	Dearborn
3rd	December 7, 1818 – November 19, 1821	Williamson Dunn	Nonpartisan	Jefferson, Jennings, & Ripley
4th	December 7, 1818 – November 19, 1821	Williamson Dunn	Nonpartisan	Jefferson, Jennings, & Ripley
5th	December 7, 1818 – November 19, 1821	Williamson Dunn	Nonpartisan	Jefferson, Jennings, & Ripley
6th	November 19, 1821 – December 2, 1822	Samuel Milroy	Nonpartisan	Washington & Scott
7th	December 2, 1822 – December 1, 1823	General Washington Johnston	Nonpartisan	Knox
8th	December 1, 1823 – January 10, 1824	David Hervey Maxwell	Nonpartisan	Monroe
9th	January 10, 1825 – December 5, 1825	Stephen Stevens	Nonpartisan	Switzerland
10th	December 5, 1825 – December 4, 1826	Robert Morgan Evans	Nonpartisan	Gibson
11th	December 4, 1826 – December 1, 1828	Harbin H. Moore	Nonpartisan	Harrison
12th	December 4, 1826 – December 1, 1828	Harbin H. Moore	Nonpartisan	Harrison
13th	December 1, 1828 – December 7, 1829	Isaac Howk	Nonpartisan	Clark
14th	December 7, 1829 – December 6, 1830	Ross Smiley	Nonpartisan	Union
15th	December 6, 1830 – December 5, 1831	Isaac Howk	Nonpartisan	Clark
16th	December 5, 1831 – December 3, 1832	Harbin H. Moore	Nonpartisan	Floyd
17th	December 3, 1832 – December 2, 1833	John Wesley Davis	Nonpartisan	Sullivan
18th	December 2, 1833 – December 1, 1834	Nathan B. Palmer	Nonpartisan	Jefferson
19th	December 1, 1834 – December 7, 1835	James Gregory	Whig	Warren
20th	December 7, 1835 – December 4, 1837	Caleb Blood Smith	Whig	Fayette
21st	December 7, 1835 – December 4, 1837	Caleb Blood Smith	Whig	Fayette
22nd	December 4, 1837 – December 2, 1839	Thomas Jefferson Evans	Whig	Fountain
23rd	December 4, 1837 – December 2, 1839	Thomas Jefferson Evans	Whig	Fountain
24th	December 2, 1839 – December 7, 1840	James G. Read	Democratic	Clark
25th	December 7, 1840 – December 6, 1841	Samuel Judah	Whig	Knox
26th	December 6, 1841 – December 5, 1842	John Wesley Davis	Democratic	Sullivan
27th	December 5, 1842 – December 4, 1843	Thomas Jefferson Henley	Democratic	Clark
28th	December 4, 1843 – December 2, 1844	Andrew L. Robinson	Democratic	Carroll
29th	December 2, 1844 – December 1, 1845	Alexander Campbell Stevenson	Whig	Putnam
30th	December 1, 1845 – December 7, 1846	John S. Simonson	Democratic	Clark
31st	December 7, 1846 – December 6, 1847	Robert N. Carnan	Whig	Knox
32nd	December 6, 1847 – December 4, 1848	William A. Porter	Whig	Harrison
33rd	December 4, 1848 – December 30, 1850	George W. Carr	Democratic	Lawrence
34th	December 4, 1848 – December 30, 1850	George W. Carr	Democratic	Lawrence
35th	December 30, 1850 – December 1, 1851	Ebenezer Dumont	Democratic	Dearborn
36th	December 1, 1851 – April 6, 1852	John Wesley Davis	Democratic	Sullivan
36th	Vacant (April 6–8, 1852)			
36th	April 8, 1852 – November 3, 1852	William Hayden English	Democratic	Scott
37th	November 3, 1852 – November 8, 1854	Oliver Brooks Torbet	Democratic	Dearborn
38th	November 8, 1854 – November 5, 1856	David Kilgore	People's	Delaware
39th	November 5, 1856 – November 3, 1858	Ballard Smith	Democratic	Perry
40th	November 3, 1858 – November 7, 1860	Jonathan W. Gordon	Republican	Marion
41st	November 7, 1860 – November 5, 1862	Cyrus M. Allen	Republican	Knox
42nd	November 5, 1862 – November 9, 1864	Samuel Hamilton Buskirk	Democratic	Monroe
43rd	November 9, 1864 – November 7, 1866	John Pettit	Republican	Wabash
44th	November 7, 1866 – November 4, 1868	David C. Branham	Republican	Jefferson
45th	November 4, 1868 – April 8, 1869	Ambrose P. Stanton	Republican	Marion
45th	April 8, 1869 – November 9, 1870	George A. Buskirk	Republican	Monroe
46th	November 9, 1870 – November 6, 1872	William G. Mack	Democratic	Vigo
47th	November 6, 1872 – November 4, 1874	William K. Edwards	Republican	Vigo
48th	November 4, 1874 – November 8, 1876	David Turpie	Democratic	Marion
49th	November 8, 1876 – November 6, 1878	John Overmyer	Republican	Jennings
50th	November 6, 1878 – November 3, 1880	Henry Sullivan Cauthorn	Democratic	Knox
51st	November 3, 1880 – November 8, 1882	William Marion Ridpath	Republican	Clay, Hendricks, & Putnam
52nd	November 8, 1882 – November 5, 1884	William D. Bynum	Democratic	Marion
53rd	November 5, 1884 – November 3, 1886	Charles L. Jewett	Democratic	Clark, Floyd, & Scott
54th	November 3, 1886 – November 7, 1888	Warren G. Sayre	Republican	Wabash
55th	November 7, 1888 – November 9, 1892	Mason J. Niblack	Democratic	Knox
56th	November 7, 1888 – November 9, 1892	Mason J. Niblack	Democratic	Knox
57th	November 9, 1892 – November 7, 1894	James B. Curtis	Democratic	Marion & Shelby
58th	November 7, 1894 – November 9, 1896	Justus C. Adams	Republican	Marion
59th	November 9, 1896 – November 9, 1898	Henry C. Petitt	Republican	Wabash
60th	November 9, 1898 – 7, 1900	Frank L. Littleton	Republican	Marion
61st	November 7, 1900 – November 5, 1902	Samuel R. Artman	Republican	Boone, Hamilton, Madison & Montgomery
62nd	November 5, 1902 – November 9, 1904	Henry Wright Marshall, Sr.	Republican	Tippecanoe & Warren
63rd	November 9, 1904 – November 7, 1906	Sidney W. Cantwell	Republican	Blackford, Jay, & Randolph
64th	November 7, 1906 – November 4, 1908	Emmett Forrest Branch	Republican	Morgan
65th	November 4, 1908 – November 9, 1910	Thomas Michael Honan	Democratic	Jackson
66th	November 9, 1910 – November 6, 1912	Albert Julius Veneman	Democratic	Gibson, Knox, & Vanderburgh
67th	November 6, 1912 – November 4, 1914	Homer Livingston Cook	Democratic	Marion
68th	November 4, 1914 – November 8, 1916	Charles Haddon Bedwell	Democratic	Sullivan
69th	November 8, 1916 – November 3, 1920	Jesse E. Eschbach	Republican	Kosciusko
70th	November 8, 1916 – November 3, 1920	Jesse E. Eschbach	Republican	Kosciusko
71st	November 3, 1920 – December 14, 1921 (Note: Died in office.)	John F. McClure	Republican	Madison
71st	December 14, 1921 – November 8, 1922	Claude A. Smith	Republican	Gibson
72nd	November 8, 1922 – November 4, 1924	Raymond C. Morgan	Republican	Henry
73rd	November 5, 1924 – November 7, 1928	Harry G. Leslie	Republican	Tippecanoe & Warren
74th	November 5, 1924 – November 7, 1928	Harry G. Leslie	Republican	Tippecanoe & Warren
75th	November 7, 1928 – November 5, 1930	James Merrill Knapp	Republican	Wayne
76th	November 5, 1930 – November 9, 1932	Walter D. Myers	Democratic	Marion
77th	November 9, 1932 – November 7, 1934	Henry C. Crawford	Democratic	Union & Wayne
78th	November 7, 1934 – November 9, 1938	Edward H. Stein	Democratic	Greene
79th	November 7, 1934 – November 9, 1938	Edward H. Stein	Democratic	Greene
80th	November 9, 1938 – November 4, 1942	James M. Knapp	Republican	Wayne
81st	November 9, 1938 – November 4, 1942	James M. Knapp	Republican	Wayne
82nd	November 4, 1942 – November 3, 1948	William H. Creighton	Republican	Kosciusko
83rd	November 4, 1942 – November 3, 1948	William H. Creighton	Republican	Kosciusko
84th	November 4, 1942 – November 3, 1948	William H. Creighton	Republican	Kosciusko
85th	November 3, 1948 – November 8, 1950	Robert H. Heller	Democratic	Adams & Wells
86th	November 8, 1950 – November 5, 1952	Winfred O. Hughes	Republican	Allen
87th	November 5, 1952 – November 3, 1954	James D. Allen	Republican	Orange & Washington
88th	November 3, 1954 – November 5, 1958	George S. Diener	Republican	Marion
89th	November 3, 1954 – November 5, 1958	George S. Diener	Republican	Marion
90th	November 5, 1958 – November 9, 1960	Birch Bayh	Democratic	Vigo
91st	November 9, 1960 – November 4, 1964	Richard W. Guthrie	Republican	Marion
92nd	November 9, 1960 – November 4, 1964	Richard W. Guthrie	Republican	Marion
93rd	November 4, 1964 – November 9, 1966	Richard C. Bodine	Democratic	St. Joseph
94th	November 9, 1966 – November 8, 1972	Otis Bowen	Republican	8th District
95th	November 9, 1966 – November 8, 1972	Otis Bowen	Republican	8th District
96th	November 9, 1966 – November 8, 1972	Otis Bowen	Republican	8th District
97th	November 8, 1972 – November 6, 1974	Kermit O. Burrous	Republican	22nd District
98th	November 6, 1974 – November 3, 1976	Phillip E. Bainbridge	Democratic	2nd District
99th	November 3, 1976 – November 5, 1980	Kermit O. Burrous	Republican	22nd District
100th	November 3, 1976 – November 5, 1980	Kermit O. Burrous	Republican	22nd District
101st	November 5, 1980 – November 3, 1982	J. Roberts Dailey	Republican	37th District
102nd	November 3, 1982 – November 5, 1986	J. Roberts Dailey	Republican	35th District
103rd	November 3, 1982 – November 5, 1986	J. Roberts Dailey	Republican	35th District
104th	November 5, 1986 – November 9, 1988	Paul S. Mannweiler	Republican	49th District
105th	November 9, 1988 – November 7, 1990 (Note: The House of Representatives evenly divided with 50 Democratic and 50 Republican members, Mannweiler and Phillips served jointly as speaker for the duration of the 105th term.)	Paul S. Mannweiler	Republican	49th District
105th	November 9, 1988 – November 7, 1990	Michael K. Phillips	Democratic	74th District
106th	November 7, 1990 – November 9, 1994	Michael K. Phillips	Democratic	74th District
107th	November 7, 1990 – November 9, 1994	Michael K. Phillips	Democratic	74th District
108th	November 9, 1994 – November 6, 1996	Paul S. Mannweiler	Republican	87th District
109th	November 6, 1996 – November 6, 2002	John R. Gregg	Democratic	45th District
110th	November 6, 1996 – November 6, 2002	John R. Gregg	Democratic	45th District
111th	November 6, 1996 – November 6, 2002	John R. Gregg	Democratic	45th District
112th	November 6, 2002 – November 3, 2004	Pat Bauer	Democratic	6th District
113th	November 3, 2004 – November 8, 2006	Brian Bosma	Republican	88th District
114th	November 8, 2006 – November 3, 2010	Pat Bauer	Democratic	6th District
115th	November 8, 2006 – November 3, 2010	Pat Bauer	Democratic	6th District
116th	November 3, 2010 – March 9, 2020 (Note: Bosma resigned the speakership partway through the 120th Assembly in order to oversee a smooth transition of power to his successor, Huston.)	Brian Bosma	Republican	88th District
117th	November 3, 2010 – March 9, 2020	Brian Bosma	Republican	88th District
118th	November 3, 2010 – March 9, 2020	Brian Bosma	Republican	88th District
119th	November 3, 2010 – March 9, 2020	Brian Bosma	Republican	88th District
120th	November 3, 2010 – March 9, 2020	Brian Bosma	Republican	88th District
120th	March 9, 2020 – November 4, 2026	Todd Huston	Republican	37th District
121st	March 9, 2020 – November 4, 2026	Todd Huston	Republican	37th District
122nd	March 9, 2020 – November 4, 2026	Todd Huston	Republican	37th District
123rd	March 9, 2020 – November 4, 2026	Todd Huston	Republican	37th District
124th	March 9, 2020 – November 4, 2026	Todd Huston	Republican	37th District
125th	November 4, 2026 – incumbent	Ben Smaltz	Republican	52nd District

== See also ==
- Indiana House of Representatives
- Indiana General Assembly
- List of Indiana General Assemblies
