= Ross Deal =

American politician

Member of the Indiana House of Representatives from the 7th district
- In office 2018 – November 4, 2020
- Preceded by: Joe Taylor
- Succeeded by: Jake Teshka

Personal details
- Party: Democratic

Ross Deal is an American politician. He served as a Democratic member for the 7th district of the Indiana House of Representatives from 2018 to 2020

Deal served in the United States Marine Corps. In 2018, he was elected for the 7th district of the Indiana House of Representatives, succeeding Joe Taylor and serving until 2020 when he was defeated by Jake Teshka.
