= Neese =

Neese is a surname. Notable people with the surname include:

- Brian Neese (born 1964), American professional strongman competitor
- Charles Gelbert Neese (1916–1989), American judge
- Frank Neese, German theoretical chemist
- Mike Neese (born 1969), American politician
- Skylar Neese (1996–2012), American murder victim
- Terry Neese, American businesswoman and political candidate
- Tim Neese, American politician

== See also ==
- Meanings of minor planet names: 9001–10000#211
