= Scott Reske =

American politician

Member of the Indiana House of Representatives from the 37th district
- In office December 27, 2001 – November 7, 2012
- Preceded by: Scott Mellinger
- Succeeded by: Todd Huston

Personal details
- Party: Democratic
- Spouse: Jennifer
- Children: 4
- Education: Purdue University; City University of Seattle

Scott E. Reske is a former Democratic member of the Indiana House of Representatives, representing the 37th District. He is a former chair of the Midwestern Legislative Conference, the Midwestern office of The Council of State Governments. Reske was a candidate for United States Representative in Indiana's 5th congressional district. He lost the election to Republican Susan Brooks.

== Early life, education, and military service ==
Scott Reske moved to Indiana with his family in 1964 when his father began work as a plant engineer in Lapel, Indiana. He was raised in Madison County and graduated from Pendleton Heights High School in 1978. He then attended Purdue University studying Engineering. He also volunteered as a firefighter. While in college, he also joined the United States Marine Corps. He also attended Officer Candidate School and was an Honor Graduate from The Basic School in Quantico, Virginia.

After graduating in 1983, Scott was commissioned a second lieutenant in the Marine Corps and became a Marine aviator. He left active duty in 1992 and joined the Marine Corps reserves. While serving in the Marines, he earned a Master of Public Administration from City University of Seattle.

In 2004 Scott was placed on active duty to support the Marine Corps review of the deployment process and in-country use of the Rapid Deployment Force in Haiti. After 60 days of his assignment, he and his team were re-positioned to Iraq in support of a focused collection effort on multiple assigned areas of interest. Mr. Reske only spent 32 days in Iraq.

Scott continued his military service in the Marine Corps Reserve. Serving a total of 28 years, Scott retired as a colonel in 2009. He was a member of the Pendleton Volunteer Fire Department. He's also a reserve deputy with the Madison County Sheriff's Department.

== Business career ==
After leaving active duty in 1992, Scott joined the family business and moved his family back to Pendleton. Scott was a business owner and principal of one of Indiana's major civil engineering firms, which employs over 100 people. He is also involved with construction products companies.

== Indiana House of Representatives ==
=== Elections ===
After redistricting, Reske decided to run for the Indiana House of Representatives in the 37th House District and defeated Republican Rob Steele 51%-49%. In 2004, he won re-election to a second term with 63% of the vote. In 2006, he won re-election to a third term unopposed. In 2008, he won re-election to a fourth term with 51% of the vote. In 2010, he won re-election to a fifth term with 49% of the vote. Reske's term in the Indiana House ended in 2012.

=== Tenure ===
Iraq War

In 2003, he was the only member in the state legislature that had the possibility of being deployed into the Iraq War. This would bring the Democrats majority down to just two seats.

Indiana Pacers NBA team

Reske criticized the City of Indianapolis for pledging to spend $33 million on a new stadium deal for the Indiana Pacers. He said "If they think Madison County taxpayers are going to bail them out, they're wrong. As long as I represent this district, Madison County won't pay for the mismanagement in Indianapolis."

=== Committee assignments ===
- House Committee on Commerce, Small Business, and Economic Development (Ranking Minority leader)
- House Committee on Government and Regulatory Reform
- House Committee on Public Health

== 2012 congressional election ==
In September 2011, Reske announced his plans to run for a seat in the U.S. House of Representatives. He ran in Indiana's 5th congressional district, vacated by retiring Republican U.S. Congressman Dan Burton. Reske lost the election to Republican Susan Brooks, 58%-37%.

== Post-legislative career ==
After retiring from the Indiana legislature in 2012, Reske was hired by the newly elected Indiana Superintendent of Public Instruction, Glenda Ritz. Reske serves as the executive director of government and public affairs for the Indiana Department of Education.

== Personal life ==
Scott is married to Jennifer and has four children.
