= Indiana General Assembly =

Legislative branch of the state government of Indiana

Coordinates: 38°46′07″N 86°9′46″W

Type
- Type: Bicameral
- Houses: Senate; House of Representatives

Leadership
- Senate President: Micah Beckwith (R) since January 13, 2025
- Senate President pro tempore: Rodric Bray (R) since November 20, 2018
- House Speaker: Todd Huston (R) since March 9, 2020

Structure
- Seats: 150
- Senate political groups: Republican (40); Democratic (10)
- House of Representatives political groups: Republican (70); Democratic (30)

Elections
- Last Senate election: November 5, 2024
- Last House of Representatives election: November 5, 2024
- Next Senate election: November 3, 2026
- Next House of Representatives election: November 3, 2026

Meeting place
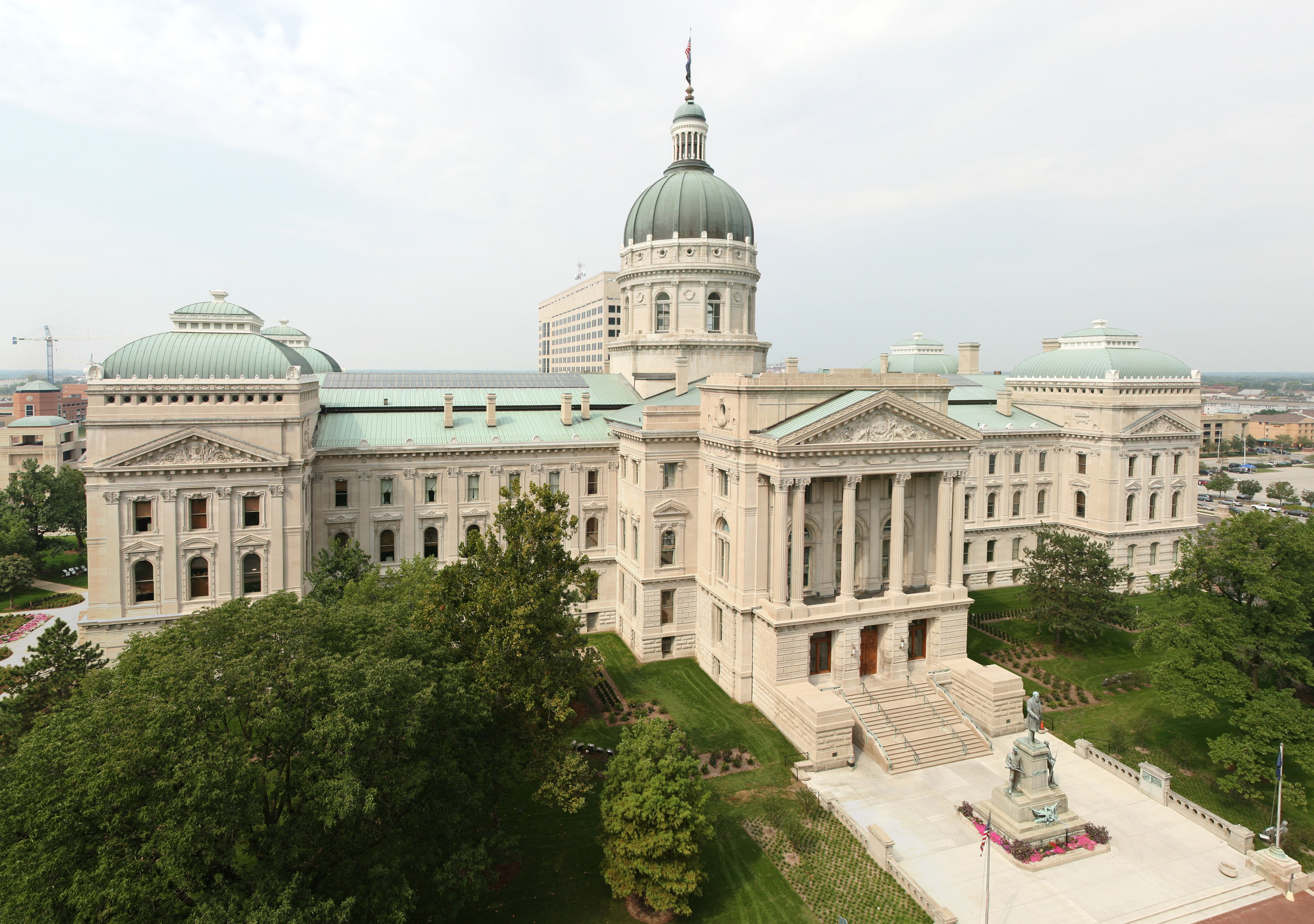
- Indiana State House; Indianapolis
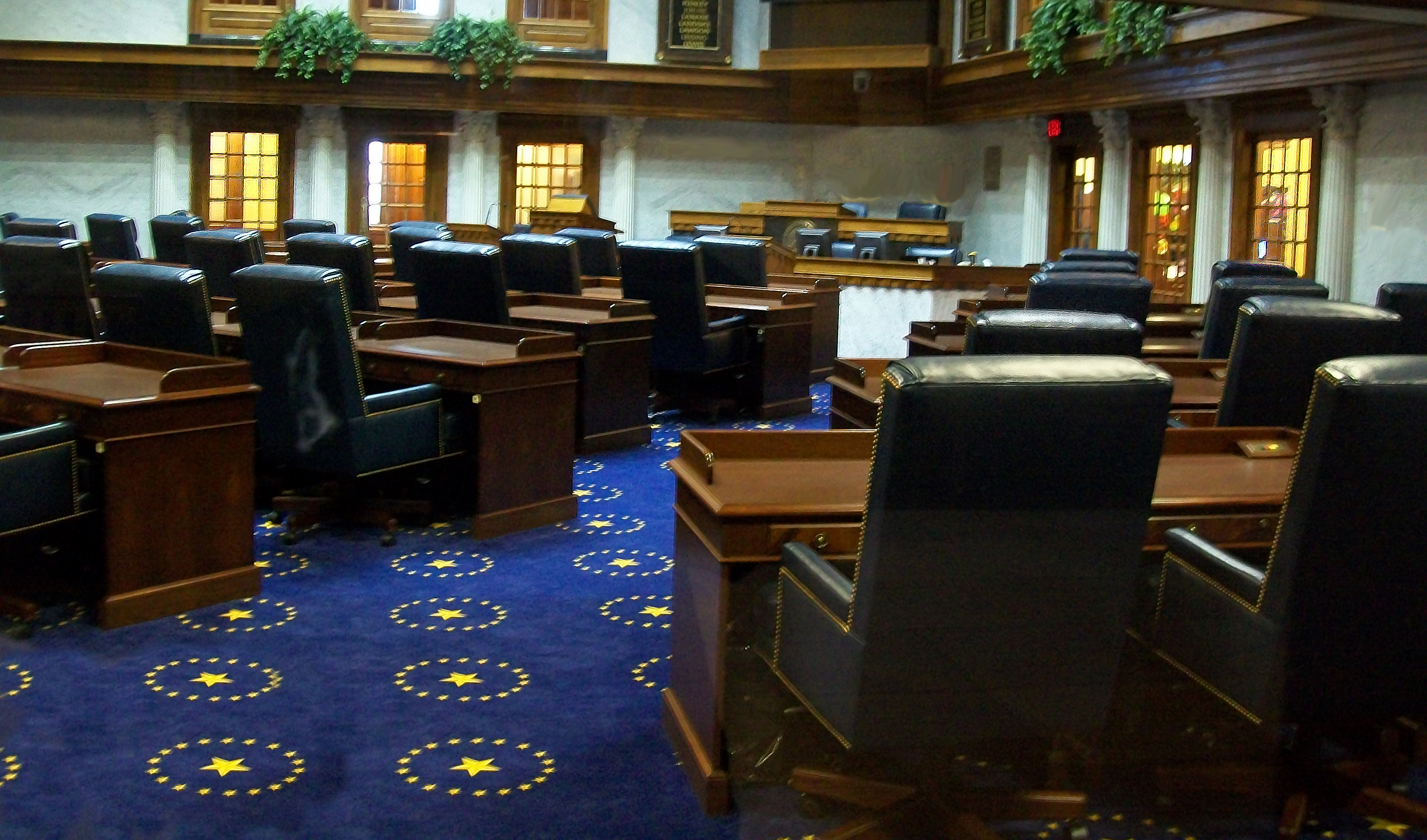
- Senate Chamber
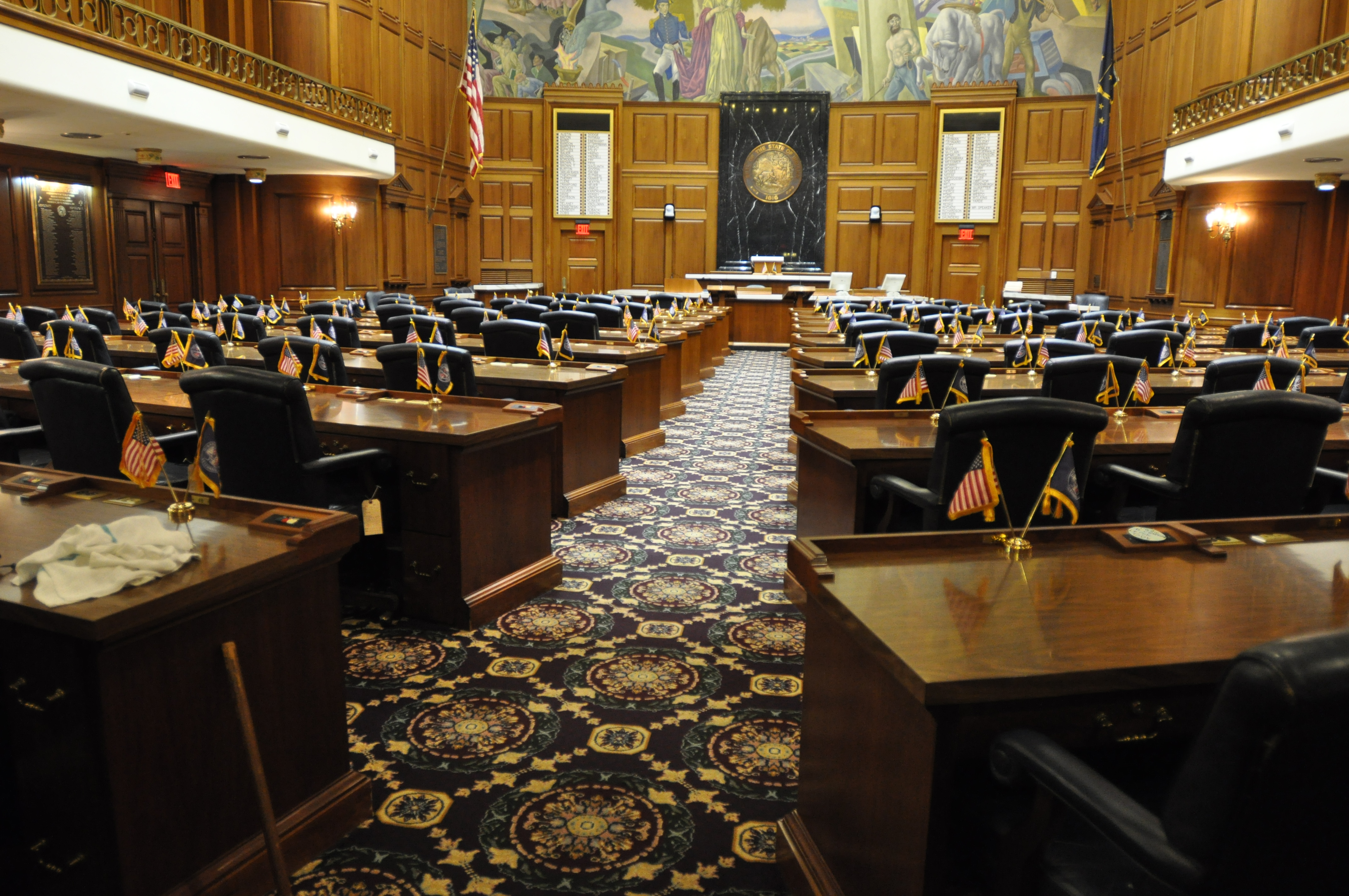
- House of Representatives Chamber

Website
- Indiana General Assembly

Constitution
- Constitution of Indiana

The Indiana General Assembly is the state legislature, or legislative branch, of the U.S. state of Indiana. It is a bicameral legislature that consists of a lower house, the Indiana House of Representatives, and an upper house, the Indiana Senate. The General Assembly meets annually at the Indiana Statehouse in Indianapolis.

Members of the General Assembly are elected from districts that are realigned every ten years. Representatives serve terms of two years and senators serve terms of four years. Both houses can create bills, but bills must pass both houses before they can be submitted to the governor and enacted into law.

As of 2024, the Republican Party holds supermajorities in both chambers of the General Assembly. Republicans outnumber Democrats in the Senate by a 40–10 margin, and in the House of Representatives by a 70–30 margin.

== Structure ==
The Indiana General Assembly is made up of two houses, the House of Representatives and the Senate. Indiana has a part-time legislature that does not meet year-round. The General Assembly convenes on the first Tuesday after the first Monday in January. During odd-numbered years the legislature meets for 61 days (not necessarily consecutively) and must be adjourned by April 30. During even-numbered years the legislature meets for 30 days (not necessarily consecutively) and must be adjourned by March 15. The General Assembly may not adjourn for more than three days without a resolution approving adjournment being passed in both houses. The governor has the authority to call on the General Assembly to convene a special session if legislators are unable to complete necessary work within the time allotted by the regular sessions. Special sessions of the General Assembly were rarely called in the state's early history, but have become more commonplace in modern times.

The General Assembly delegates are elected from districts. Every ten years the districts are realigned by the General Assembly using information from the U.S. Census Bureau to ensure that each district is roughly equal in population. The districting is maintained to comply with the United States Supreme Court ruling in Reynolds v. Sims.

The Indiana Senate and House of Representatives each has several committees charged with overseeing certain areas of the state. Committees vary in size, from three to eleven members. The committees are chaired by senior members of the majority party. Senators and representatives can be members of multiple committees. Most legislation begins within the committees who have responsibility for the area that the bill will affect. Once approved by a committee, a bill can be entered into the agenda for debate and vote in the full chamber. Although not common, bills can be voted on by the full house without going through the committee process.

Indiana legislators make a base annual salary of $33,032, plus $196 for each day in session or at a committee hearing and $62 in expense pay every other day.

=== Terms and qualifications ===
Article 4, Section 7, of the Indiana Constitution states the qualifications to become a Senator or Representative. The candidate must have been a U.S. citizen for a minimum of two years prior to his candidacy and must have been resident of the district that he seeks to represent for one year. Senators must be at least twenty-five years of age and representatives must be twenty-one when sworn into office. The candidate cannot hold any other public office in the state or federal government during their term. The candidate must also be a registered voter within the district they seek to represent. Candidates are required to file papers stating their economic interests.

Article 4, Section 3, of the state constitution places several limitations on the size and composition of the General Assembly. The Senate can contain no more than fifty members, and the senators serve for a term of four years. The House of Representatives can contain no more than one hundred members, and the representatives serve terms of two years. There is no limit to how many terms a state senator or representative may serve.

=== Checks and balances ===
There are several checks and balances built into the state constitution that limit the power of the General Assembly. Other clauses allow the General Assembly to balance and limit the authority of the other branches of the government. Among these checks and balances is the governor's authority to veto any bill passed by the General Assembly. The General Assembly may, in turn, override his veto by simple majority vote in both houses. Bills passed by a supermajority automatically become law without requiring the signature of the governor. Once the bill is made law, it can be challenged in the state courts—which may rule the law to be unconstitutional, effectively repealing the law. The General Assembly could then override the court's decision by amending the state constitution to include the law. The General Assembly has historically been the most powerful branch of the state government, dominating a weak governor's office. Although the governor's office has gained more power since the 1970s, the General Assembly still retains the power to remove much of that authority.

=== Powers ===
The authority and powers of the Indiana General Assembly are established in the state constitution. The General Assembly has sole legislative power within the state government. Each house can initiate legislation, with the exception that the Senate is not permitted to initiate legislation that will affect revenue. Bills are debated and passed separately in each house, but must be passed by both houses before they can submit to the governor. Each law passed by the General Assembly must be applied uniformly to the entire state; the General Assembly has no authority to create legislation that targets only a particular community.

The General Assembly is empowered to regulate the state's judiciary system by setting the size of the courts and the bounds of their districts. The body also has the authority to monitor the activities of the executive branch of the state government, has limited power to regulate the county governments within the state, and has sole power to initiate the process to amend the state constitution.

Under Indiana law, legislators cannot be arrested while the General Assembly is in session unless the crime they commit is treason, a felony, or breach of the peace.

=== Indiana Senate ===
The Indiana Senate consists of 50 members elected to four-year terms. Micah Beckwith, the Lieutenant Governor of Indiana, presides over the Senate while it is in session and casts the deciding vote in the event of a tie. The Senate President Pro Tempore is Senator Rodric D. Bray of Martinsville. The 2025–26 Senate has a Republican super-majority, with Republicans holding 40 out of 50 seats. The Senate offices are located in the west wing of the second floor of the Indiana Statehouse, and the Senate chambers are on the west wing of the third floor.

Position	Name	Party
President/Lieutenant Governor	Micah Beckwith	Republican
President Pro Tempore of the Senate	Rodric Bray	Republican
Majority Leader	Chris Garten	Republican
Majority Whip	Michael Crider	Republican
Minority Leader	Shelli Yoder	Democrat
Assistant Minority Leader	Andrea Hunley	Democrat

=== Indiana House of Representatives ===
The Indiana House of Representatives consists of 100 members elected to two-year terms. The current Speaker of the House as of March 2020 is Representative Todd Huston. The House of Representatives has a Republican majority of 70 seats, while the Democrats have 30 seats. The House offices are located in the east wing of the second floor of the Indiana Statehouse and the House chambers are on the third floor.

Position	Name	Party
Speaker of the House	Todd Huston	Republican
Majority Leader	Matthew Lehman	Republican
Minority Leader	Phil GiaQuinta	Democrat

== History ==
=== 1816 Constitution ===
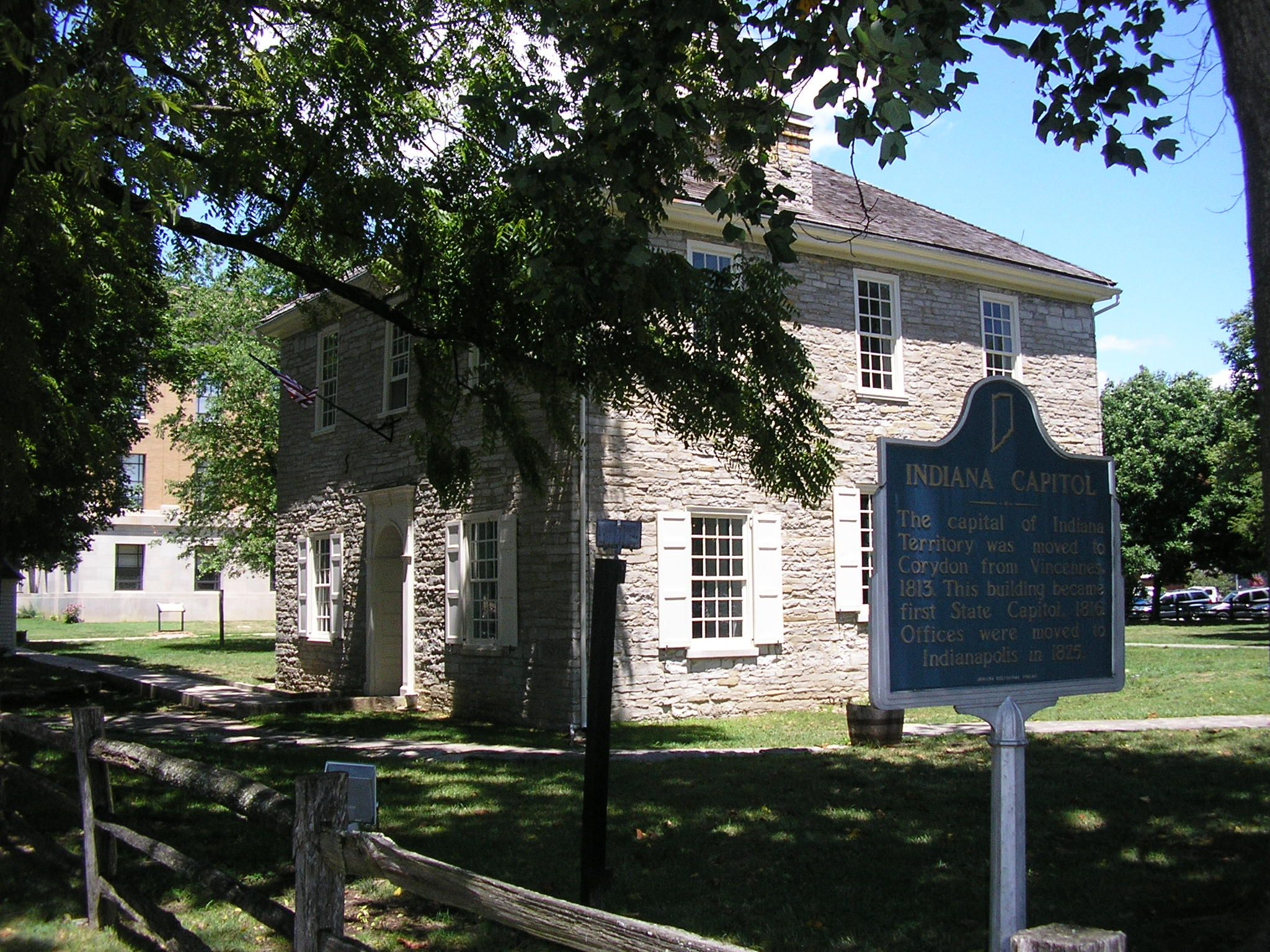
Old Capitol Building in downtown Corydon

Indiana's first constitution was ratified on June 10, 1816, and the election of the first General Assembly took place on August 5 of that year. They convened in the original three-room statehouse located in Corydon. The body consisted of ten senators and twenty-nine representatives, sixteen of whom had been signers of the Indiana state constitution. There, the General Assembly began its development into the institution it is today. The original constitution provided that representatives served terms of one year and senators served terms of three years, and permitted an annual meeting of the assembly from December until March.

At first, there was only one political party of any consequence in Indiana, the Democratic-Republicans. The party was, however, broken into three divisions that would later split off into their own parties. The divisions were mainly over the issue of slavery, but they would develop more differences in later years. The Jennings party, made up of abolitionists, was dominant in the beginning. The Noble party was in favor of slavery, and the Hendricks party was generally neutral, although Hendricks himself was openly anti-slavery. In 1818, the Noble party tried to impeach Governor Jennings over his role in the negotiations of the Treaty of St. Mary's. After two months of debate in the House, and Jennings having destroyed the evidence of his role, the House of Representatives dropped the investigation and issued a resolution that confirmed Jennings in his position as governor.

In its first two decades, the General Assembly laid the foundation of the state. They created the framework for the state's public school system, began construction on the State Seminary and of roads in the southern part of the state. Initially, the General Assembly was faced with low tax revenues. In response to the problem, they created the Bank of Indiana and sold nine million acres (36,000 km^{2}) of public lands to finance their projects. The General Assembly relocated the capital to Indianapolis in 1824, and in 1831 they authorized the construction of the first dedicated statehouse.

In the 1830s, the Whigs split from the Democratic-Republicans in response to national policies. The Whigs held a strong majority in the General Assembly in that decade. In 1843, the remnants of the old slavery party had strengthened into the Democratic Party and swept into power, the Whigs never regained their majority and the Democrats maintained power until the middle of the American Civil War. In 1836 the General Assembly passed the Mammoth Internal Improvement Act and set plans into motion to modernize the state's infrastructure. The wilderness of northern and central Indiana was slowly developed as the General Assembly approved the construction of roads, canals, railroads, and numerous other infrastructure projects. This led the state to near-bankruptcy in the late 1830s, but it was avoided when the General Assembly spun off the failing canals, and half of their debts, to private companies in 1841. The failure of the projects was the main factor in the Whigs' loss of power.

The state constitution had come under considerable criticism beginning in the 1840s because it allowed most government positions to be filled by appointment. The problem with this method of filling positions did not manifest itself until the advent of the state's political parties. Once in power, a party could stack the government with its own members, making it difficult for the minority to regain power. Another problem was that the authority for many trivial issues was not delegated to other authorities. For example, if a man was to divorce his wife, the divorce bill had to be approved by the General Assembly before he could be allowed to legally remarry.

=== 1851 Constitution ===
In 1851, a new state constitution was created and ratified. Among the constitution's new clauses was an extension of the terms of representatives to two years and senators to four years. It also made many of the previously appointed positions open to public election. The new constitution delegated many minor tasks to newly created elected offices. With its workload considerably decreased, instead of meeting annually, the General Assembly only convened a session every two years. The new constitution also placed new limits on the General Assembly's power to create local laws, the General Assembly having become notorious for creating state-level laws that were only applied to one town or county.

The new constitution led to the gradual erosion of the Democratic majority. In 1854, the Republican Party was established and drew in many of the former Whigs. That year the General Assembly was split with no party attaining a majority. The Democrats held the largest number of seats, but the Whigs and Republicans caucused to form a majority and control the assembly. The result was a deadlock on most issues because Republicans and Whigs could not agree on most major issues. By 1858, the Whigs were almost completely disempowered and the Republicans gained enough seats to become the largest party, but not enough to form a majority on their own. That year Governor Ashbel P. Willard called the first special session of the General Assembly because they had been unable to pass an appropriations bill. Democrats regained a small majority by gaining the votes of the disaffected Whigs in the 1860 election.

During the 1860s and the American Civil War, the legislature was the scene of intense debate. At the beginning of the war, the General Assembly was controlled by the South-sympathetic Democrats. Governor Oliver Morton and the Republican minority were able to prevent the General Assembly from meeting in 1862 and 1863 by denying the body quorum. Morton even had some members of the body arrested or detained on suspicions of disloyalty. The lack of funding created by this crisis again led to the near-bankruptcy of the state. In 1864, the Republicans gained a majority and convened the General Assembly to remedy the state's funding problems.

During the 1880s and 1890s, Indiana industry began to grow rapidly because of the Indiana Gas Boom, leading to the creation of many labor unions and a return to Democratic control of the General Assembly. One of the events to occur during the period was the Black Day of the General Assembly, a situation arising from Governor Isaac P. Gray's desire to be elected to the United States Senate. Beginning with the state senate's refusal to seat a new lieutenant governor, fighting broke out in the chamber and spread throughout the statehouse. Shots were fired, and Democrats and Republicans threatened to kill each other before police could bring the situation under control. A second bout of violence broke out in the 1894 regular session when Republicans locked the doors of the House chambers preventing Governor Claude Matthews from delivering a veto of a bill that repealed over a decade of Democratic legislation. The governor personally led fellow party members in beating down the door and unsuccessfully attempting to fight their way to the podium to deliver the vetoed bill; one newspaper said Democrats and Republicans "fought like beasts of the forest". During those decades, the General Assembly enacted a series of laws to protect the rights of workers and encourage more industrial growth. The women's suffrage movement also began in the state and rallies were held in Indianapolis to support the female suffrage legislation that was ultimately voted down in the General Assembly.

During 1907, the General Assembly made Indiana the first state to enact eugenics legislation, and the law remained in effect until 1921. The law led to the forced sterilization of thousands of criminals until it was ruled unconstitutional by the Indiana Supreme Court in 1921.

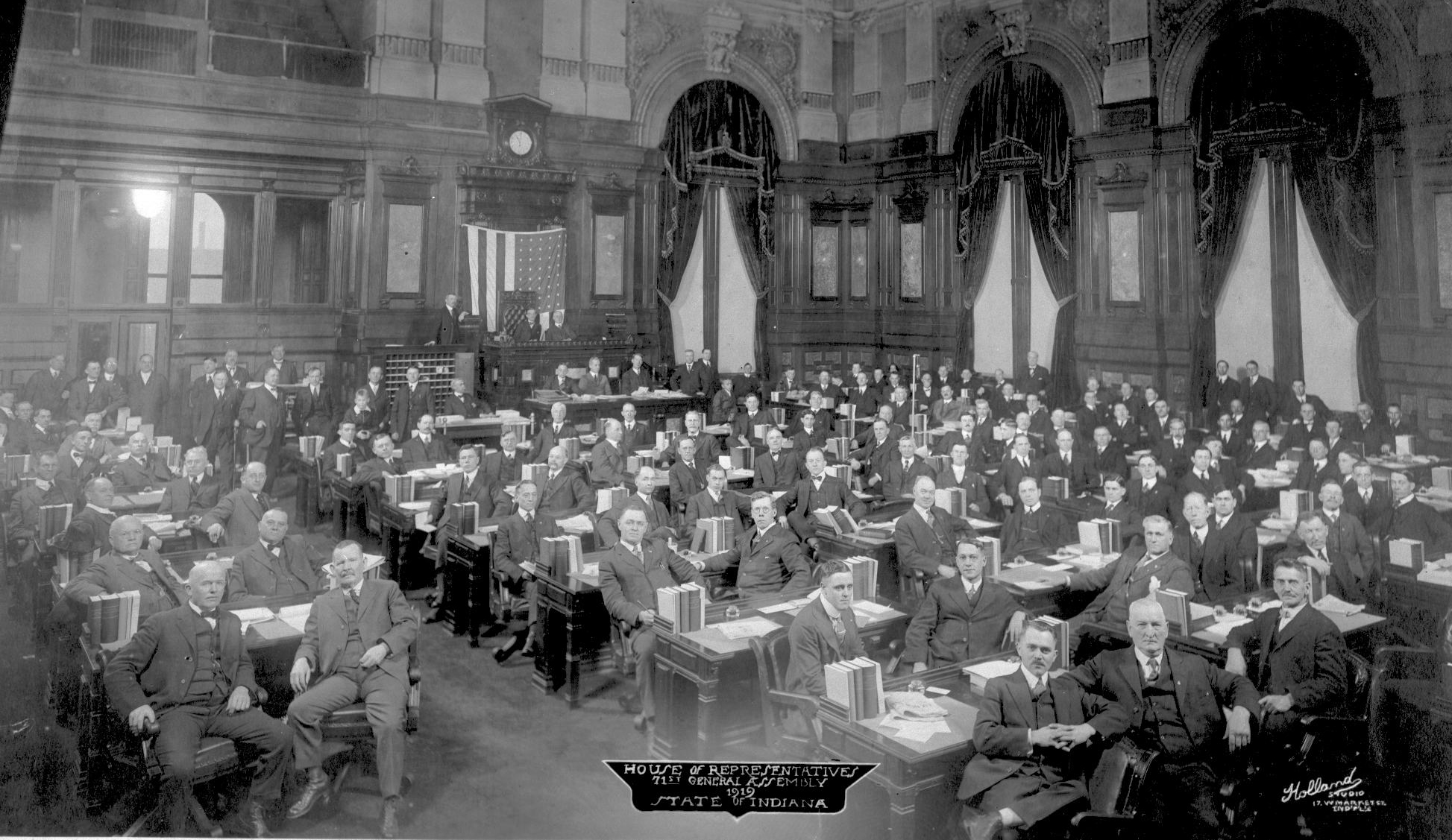
Indiana House of Representatives in special session of the 71st Indiana General Assembly, 1919

In 1919, Indiana suffragists petitioned Governor James P. Goodrich to convene a special session of the Indiana General Assembly to ratify the 19th Amendment to the U.S. Constitution. The state ratified the 19th Amendment on January 16, 1920.

In 1921, Julia Nelson was the first woman elected to the Indiana General Assembly.

Scandal erupted in 1925 when it was discovered that the Indiana Branch of the Ku Klux Klan controlled over half the seats in the General Assembly. During the session, Grand Dragon D. C. Stephenson said "I am the law in Indiana". During the next two years, the federal government intervened, Stephenson was convicted of murder. After the governor refused to pardon him, Stephenson indicted his co-conspirators, leading to many of the state government being charged with various crimes and removing much of the Klan's power.

In the 1930s, the General Assembly established the state's first general welfare programs to help the poor affected by the Great Depression. The General Assembly passed the nation's first DUI laws in 1939, establishing a blood alcohol level of .15 as the legal limit. The 1940s led to the first African American being elected to the Indiana Senate and legislation that desegregated the public schools in 1949.

The General Assembly established the state's first sales tax at two percent in 1962. The revenues from the tax led to a host of new projects across the state. The General Assembly also passed the Indiana Civil Rights bill in 1963, granting equal protection to minorities in seeking employment. In 1970 a series of constitutional amendments were passed. Among them was one that authorized the General Assembly to meet annually instead of biennially.

During the 1988 session, the Indiana House of Representatives was split evenly between both parties for the first time in Indiana's history. After a period of negotiations, both parties agreed to share majority powers, alternating which party controlled the position of speaker each day. The same General Assembly legalized horse racing in the state in 1989.

Governor Evan Bayh called a special session of the General Assembly in 1992 because no budget had been passed in the regular session. During the special session, the General Assembly passed the budget and also legalized the operation of riverboat casinos in the state, overriding the governor's veto to prevent it.

The General Assembly passed property tax reform legislation in 2008, capping property taxes at one percent, making Indiana one of the lowest property tax locations in the nation.

== See also ==
- List of Indiana General Assemblies
- Government of Indiana
- Constitution of Indiana
