= Ben Smaltz =

American politician from Indiana

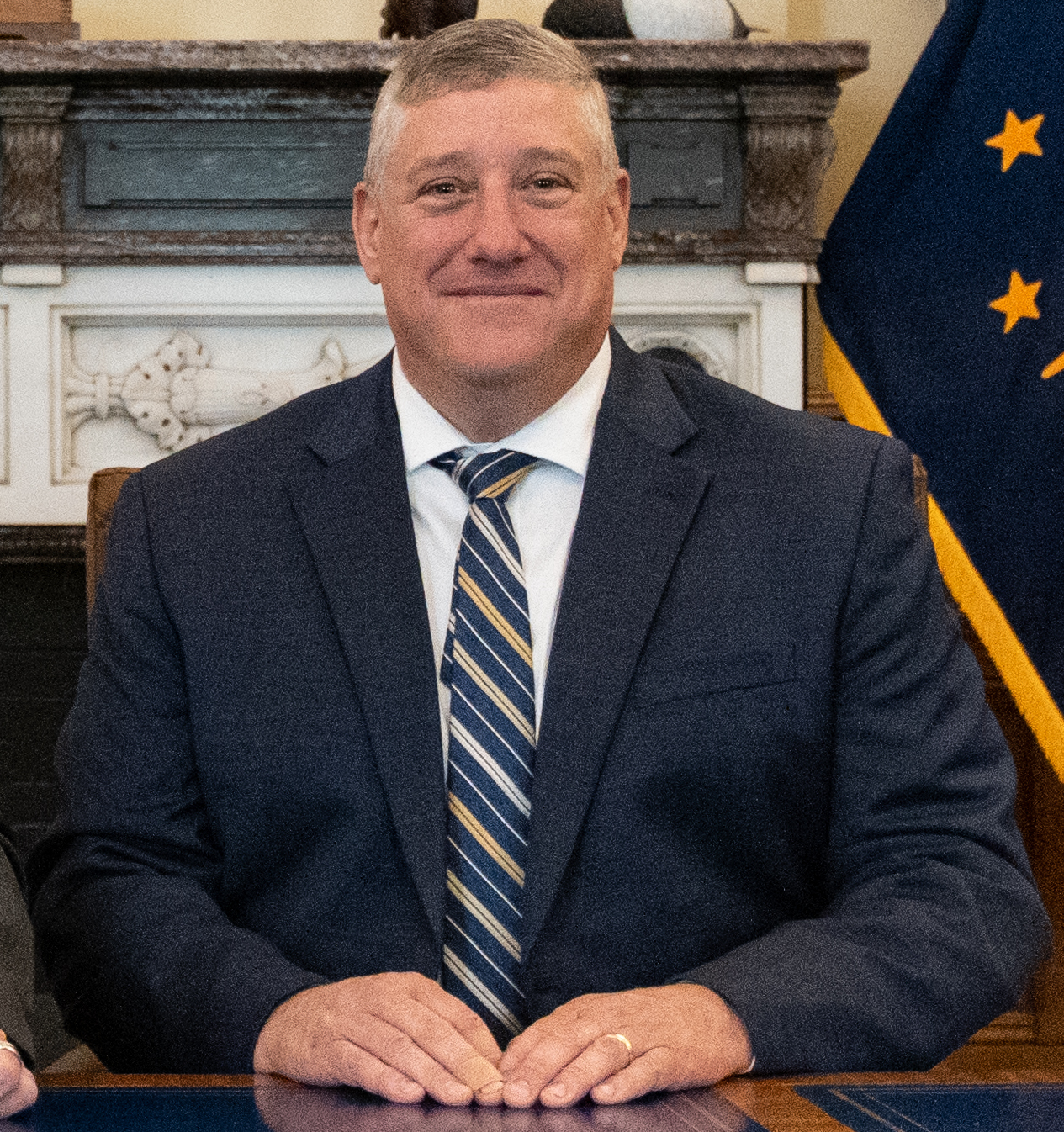

Speaker of the Indiana House of Representatives
- Incumbent
- Assumed office November 17, 2026
- Preceded by: Todd Huston

Member of the Indiana House of Representatives from the 52nd district
- Incumbent
- Assumed office November 20, 2012
- Preceded by: David Yarde

Personal details
- Born: January 17, 1970 (age 56) Auburn, Indiana, U.S.
- Party: Republican
- Education: Ball State University (BA)

Benjamin C. Smaltz (born January 17, 1970) is an American politician who has served in the Indiana House of Representatives from the 52nd district since 2012. In November 2026, Indiana House Republicans chose Smaltz to be the next Speaker of the Indiana House of Representatives after incumbent speaker Todd Huston lost reelection.
