= Chris Jeter =

American attorney and politician

Member of the Indiana House of Representatives from the 88th district
- In office August 26, 2020 – November 3, 2026
- Preceded by: Brian Bosma

Personal details
- Born: 1978 or 1979 (age 46–47) Hamilton County, Indiana, U.S.
- Party: Republican
- Spouse: Karen
- Children: 2
- Education: Oklahoma Baptist University (BA); George Washington University (JD)

Military service
- Branch/service: United States Navy
- Unit: United States Navy Reserve

Chris Jeter (born 1978/1979) is an American attorney and politician serving as a member of the Indiana House of Representatives from the 88th district. He assumed office on August 26, 2020.

== Early life and education ==
Born and raised in Hamilton County, Indiana, Jeter attended Hamilton Southeastern High School. He earned a Bachelor of Arts degree in communication and media studies from Oklahoma Baptist University and a Juris Doctor from the George Washington University Law School.

== Career ==
Jeter served in the United States Navy Reserve for seven years, including as a legal advisor in the United States Navy Judge Advocate General's Corps. He later served as a law clerk in the Delaware Attorney General's Office. Jeter worked as an associate for Barnes & Thornburg and as a founding partner of Massillamany Jeter and Carson. He was elected to the Indiana House of Representatives in 2020.

Jeter lost reelection to Democrat Stephanie Jo Yocum in the November 3, 2026 general election.
