= Jake Teshka =

American politician

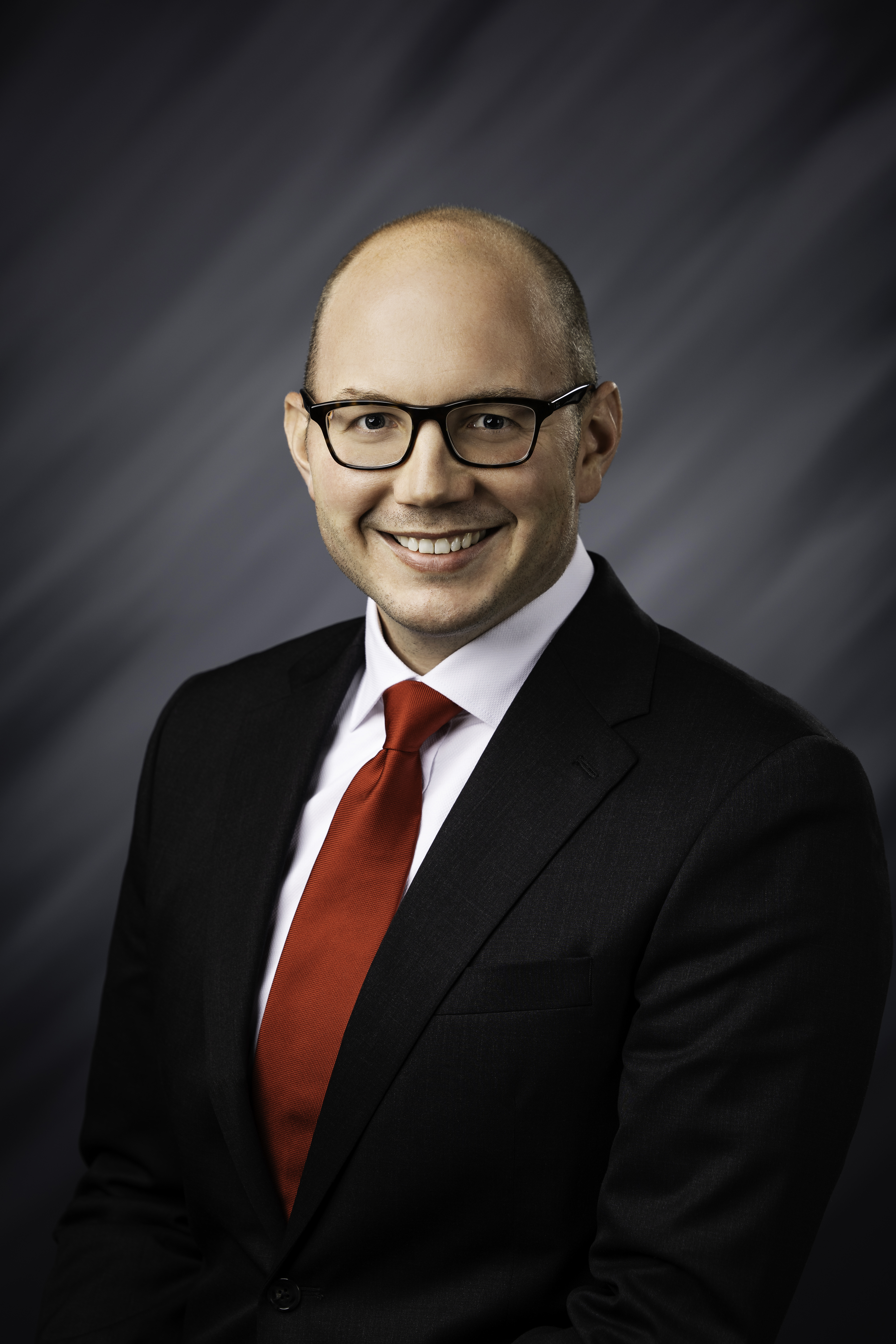

Member of the Indiana House of Representatives from the 7th district
- Incumbent
- Assumed office November 4, 2020
- Preceded by: Ross Deal

Personal details
- Born: South Bend, Indiana, U.S.
- Party: Republican
- Children: 2
- Education: Saint Joseph's College (BA); Indiana University South Bend (MPA)

Jake Teshka is an American politician serving as a member of the Indiana House of Representatives from the 7th district. He assumed office on November 4, 2020.

== Early life and education ==
Teshka was born in South Bend, Indiana and raised in the surrounding region. After graduating from St. Joseph High School, he earned a Bachelor of Arts degree in political science from Saint Joseph's College and a Master of Public Administration from Indiana University South Bend.

== Career ==
In 2008, Teshka worked as a regional political director for the Indiana Republican Party. He then worked as a field representative and executive director of the Saint Joseph County Republican Party. He served as a member of the South Bend Common Council from 2018 to 2020. During his tenure on the council, Teshka was the only Republican member. He was elected to the Indiana House of Representatives in November 2020.

Rep. Teshka has worked on a diverse set of issues including alcohol policy, entrepreneurship, and cryptocurrency. However, he has become most known as a champion of education reform. In November 2024, Teshka was named Chairman of the House Committee on Financial Institutions.

After winning re-election on November 3, 2026, Teshka was elected Majority Caucus Chair by fellow Indiana House Republicans. He was also selected to serve simultaneously as Chairman of the House Education Committee.
