= Tim Neese =

American politician

37th Mayor of Elkhart, Indiana
- In office January 1, 2016 – January 1, 2020
- Preceded by: Dick Moore
- Succeeded by: Rod Roberson

Member of the Indiana House of Representatives from the 48th district
- In office November 6, 2002 – November 5, 2014
- Preceded by: Dean R. Mock
- Succeeded by: Douglas Miller

Personal details
- Party: Republican
- Education: Ball State

Timothy Neese was the 37th mayor of Elkhart, Indiana from 2016 to 2020 after defeating incumbent Mayor Dick Moore in 2015. Neese was succeeded by Rod Roberson after not running for re-election in 2019. Neese is a former Republican member of the Elkhart Common Council representing the 2nd District. He is also a former member of the Indiana House of Representatives, representing the 48th district from 2002 until his retirement from the Legislature in 2014. Neese also previously served as the Director of the Solid Waste Management District of Elkhart County, Indiana.
