= Maureen Bauer =

American politician

Member of the Indiana House of Representatives from the 6th district
- Incumbent
- Assumed office November 16, 2020
- Preceded by: B. Patrick Bauer

Personal details
- Born: South Bend, Indiana, U.S.
- Party: Democratic
- Relations: B. Patrick Bauer (father)
- Education: Indiana University–Purdue University Indianapolis (BS); Lake Michigan College (AA)

Maureen Bauer is an American politician serving as a member of the Indiana House of Representatives from the 6th district. She assumed office on November 4, 2020.

== Early life and education ==
Bauer was born and raised in South Bend, Indiana, where she attended John Adams High School. She earned a Bachelor of Science degree in tourism, conventions, and event management from the School of Health and Human Sciences at Indiana University–Purdue University Indianapolis. Bauer later earned a certificate in wine education and management from the University of California, Los Angeles and an associate degree in viticulture and enology from Lake Michigan College.

== Career ==
Prior to entering politics, Bauer worked as a global accounts manager for HelmsBriscoe. She was elected to the Indiana House of Representatives in November 2020, succeeding her father, former Speaker B. Patrick Bauer. Bauer serves as the ranking member of the House Agriculture and Rural Development Committee.

== Electoral history ==
Indiana State House District 6 Democratic primary election, 2020
Party	Candidate	Votes	%
Democratic	Maureen Bauer	3,383	44.7%
Democratic	Garrett Blad	3,012	39.8%
Democratic	Drew Duncan	1,175	15.5%
Total votes		7,570	100.00%

Indiana State House District 6 election, 2020
Party	Candidate	Votes	%	±%
Democratic	Maureen Bauer	17,693	100.0%	N/A
Total votes		17,693	100.00%	

Indiana State House District 6 election, 2022
Party	Candidate	Votes	%	±%
Democratic	Maureen Bauer (Incumbent)	9,165	100.0%	N/A
Total votes		9,165	100.00%	

Indiana State House District 6 election, 2024
Party	Candidate	Votes	%	±%
Democratic	Maureen Bauer (Incumbent)	14,852	81.0%	−19.0%
Libertarian	Charlie Florance	3,482	19.0%	+19.0%
Total votes		18,334	100.00%	
