= Douglas Miller (Indiana politician) =

American politician

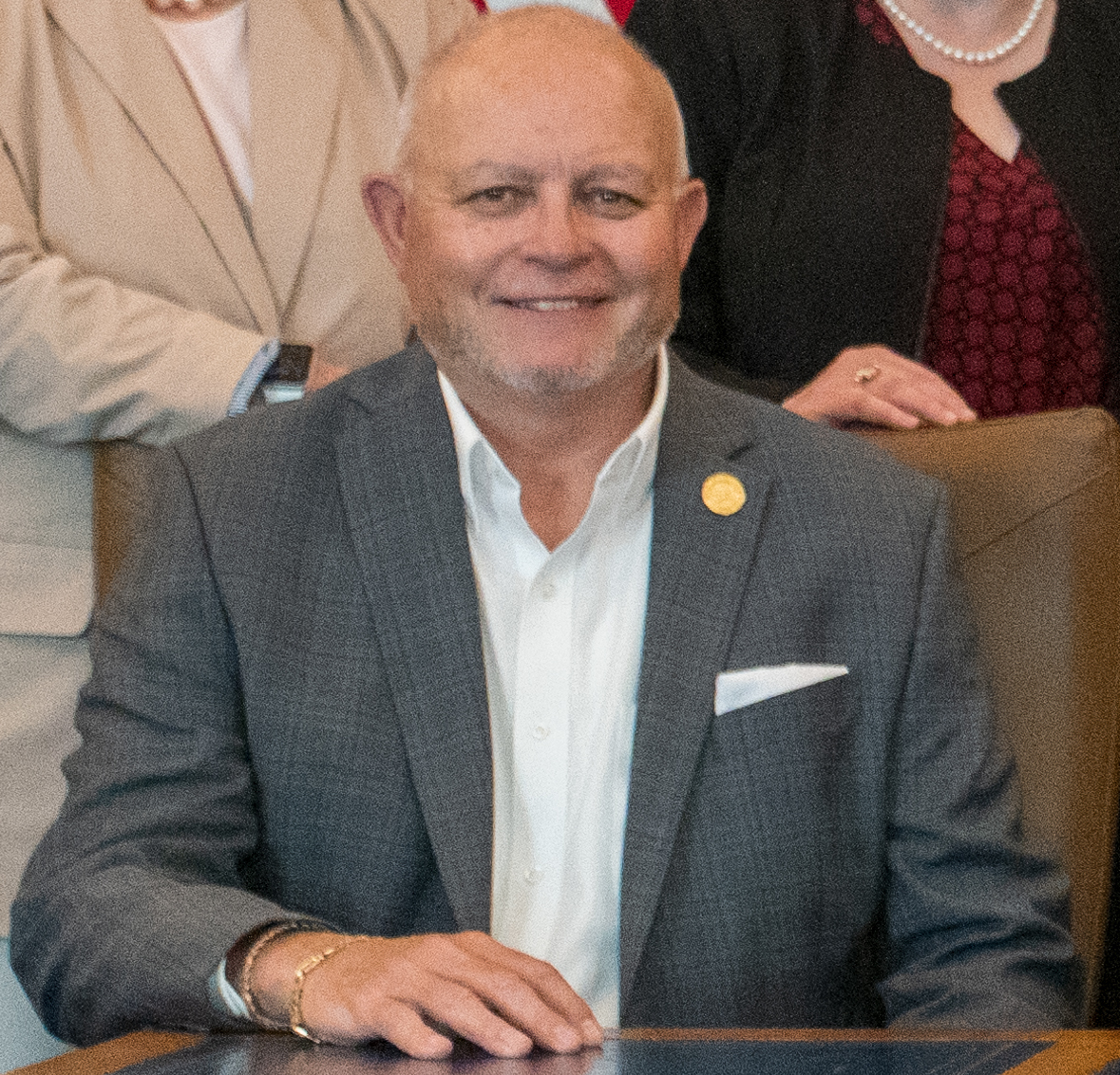

Member of the Indiana House of Representatives from the 48th district
- Incumbent
- Assumed office November 5, 2014
- Preceded by: Timothy Neese

Personal details
- Party: Republican

Douglas Miller is an American politician. He serves as a Republican member for the 48th district of the Indiana House of Representatives.

In 2014, Miller was elected for the 48th district of the Indiana House of Representatives, succeeding Timothy Neese. Miller assumed office on November 5, 2014.
