= Brian Bosma =

American politician

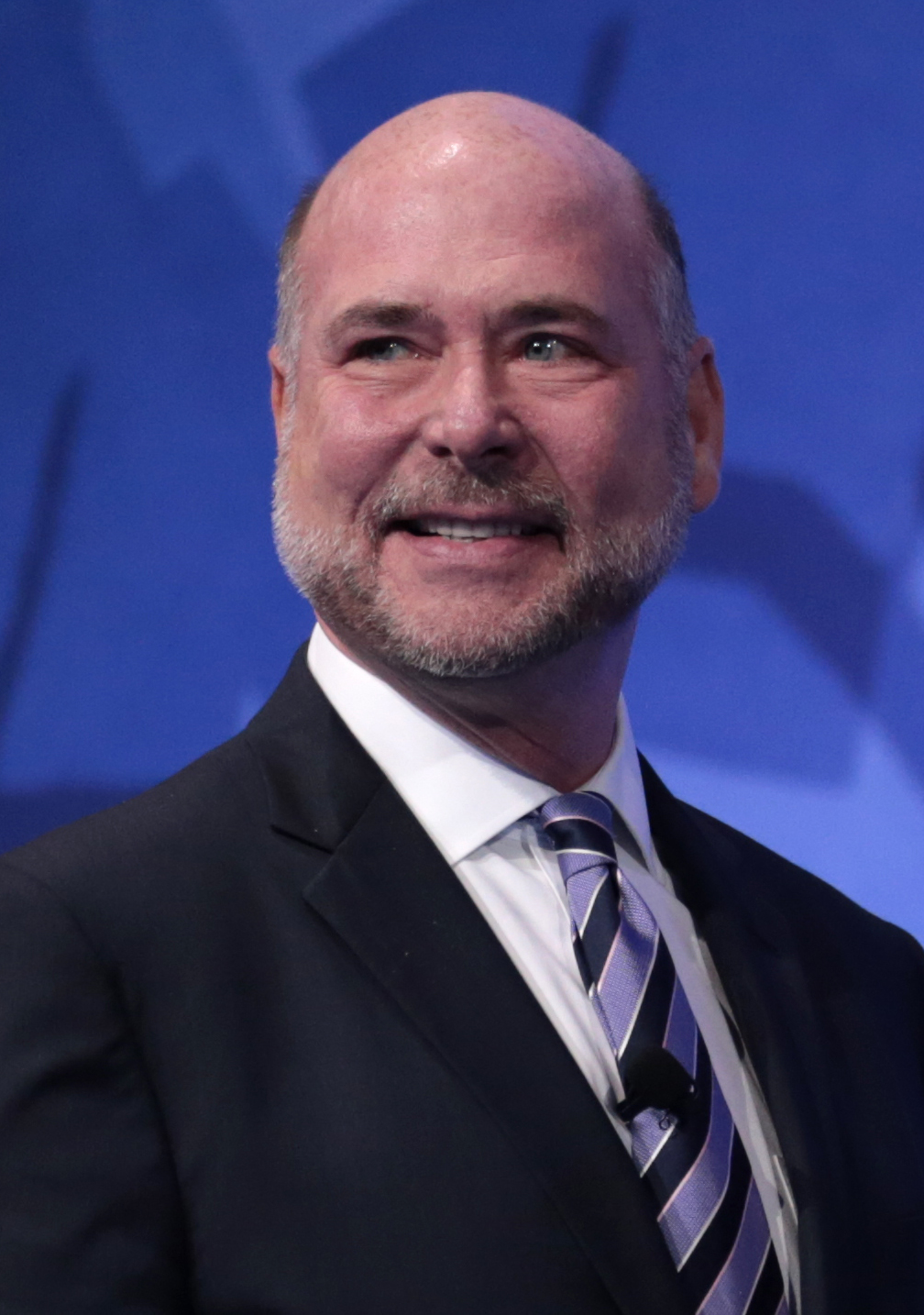

Speaker of the Indiana House of Representatives
- In office November 16, 2010 – March 9, 2020
- Preceded by: Patrick Bauer
- Succeeded by: Todd Huston
- In office November 16, 2004 – November 21, 2006
- Preceded by: Patrick Bauer
- Succeeded by: Patrick Bauer

Member of the Indiana House of Representatives from the 88th district
- In office November 4, 1992 – July 31, 2020
- Preceded by: Constituency established
- Succeeded by: Chris Jeter

Member of the Indiana House of Representatives from the 50th district
- In office May 10, 1986 – November 4, 1992
- Preceded by: Gordon Harper
- Succeeded by: Daniel Leroy Stephan

Personal details
- Born: October 31, 1957 (age 68) Beech Grove, Indiana, U.S.
- Party: Republican
- Spouse: Cheryl Bosma
- Children: 2
- Education: Purdue University, West Lafayette (BS); Indiana University, Indianapolis (JD)

Brian C. Bosma (born October 31, 1957) is an American politician and lawyer who served as speaker of the Indiana House of Representatives from 2004 to 2006 and 2010 to 2020. A member of the Republican Party, Bosma has served in the Indiana House since 1986. He replaced Gordon Harper. He was originally elected in the 50th district, but was redistricted to the 88th district in 1992. The 88th district encompasses northeast Marion County and portions of Hancock and Hamilton County.

Upon Republicans regaining a majority in the Indiana House in 2004, he was elected to his first of six nonconsecutive terms to the speakership. He served his first term as speaker until 2006, when Democrats gained control of the House, and served five more terms as speaker after Republicans won control in the 2010 elections. In the 2012 elections, Republicans obtained a super majority in the House.

Outside of state politics, Bosma is in an attorney in private practice, working as a partner with Kroger, Gardis & Regas and is the founding director of Bosma Industries for the Blind, an Indianapolis-based private non-profit which serves as Indiana's largest employer of legally blind individuals and those with severe visual impairments.

On November 19, 2019, Bosma announced his retirement from the Indiana House of Representatives at the end of the 2020 legislative session. State Representative Todd Huston succeeded Bosma as Speaker in 2020.

== Early life and education ==
Brian Bosma was born in Beech Grove, Indiana to parents Margaret and Charles Bosma. His mother was a kindergarten teacher, while his father, a United States Army officer in World War II and businessman, served in the Indiana State Senate from 1962 to 1980. His grandfather, who immigrated from the Netherlands with his eleven brothers and sisters, was a dairy operator and founded Bosma Dairy Barn, where Brian worked growing up. Bosma graduated from Beech Grove High School, where he played on the school's basketball team, and subsequently attended Purdue University. At Purdue, Bosma received a Bachelor of Science in engineering in 1981 and was a member of Beta Sigma Psi fraternity. He went on to study at Indiana University's Robert H. McKinney School of Law, where graduated with his Juris Doctor in 1984 and was then admitted to the Indiana State Bar Association and became a member of the American Bar Association later that year.

== Career ==
After passing the Indiana Bar, Bosma began working as an associate attorney with Bingham Summers Welsh and Spilman. He worked at the law firm from 1984 to 1985 upon becoming a legislative adviser in the Indiana Department of Education, a position he held from 1985 to 1986, where he served as the legislative liaison to Indiana Superintendent of Public Instruction H. Dean Evans. After leaving the state education department, Bosma reentered private practice and joined as a partner at Indianapolis-based Kroger, Gardis and Regas, LLP in 1986. Bosma has since continued to work as a partner at Kroger, Gardis and Regas outside of his work in the Indiana House's legislative sessions, where he practices governmental law, environmental law, construction law and real estate law and is the chairman of the firms' environmental practice group.

The facility of Bosma Industries was initially a public institution created by the Indiana Legislature in 1915 and was known as the Board of Industrial Aid for the Blind, having also been operated in part by Indiana's Vocational Rehabilitation Services. During his time as a legislator, Bosma's father, Charles, who strongly advocated for the rights of the blind and disabled, was honored by the state via an executive order by then-Governor Robert D. Orr in renaming the board 'Bosma Industries for the Blind'.

A few years after the renaming to Bosma Industries, members of the Indiana Legislature, becoming increasingly concerned with the cost and effectiveness of the program, had ultimately removed all state funding for the facility. This move by the state led Bosma and others to arrange the process of privatizing Bosma Industries. In 1988, Bosma became its founding director under private leadership, while maintaining over $1 million in contracts with the state; providing powdered food and drink mixes to prisons run by the Indiana Department of Corrections.

=== Indiana House of Representatives ===
Bosma was first elected in 1986 to represent House District 88, which today encompasses the northeast portion of Marion County, a portion of southern Hamilton County and the western part of Hancock County. He replaced Gordon Harper. He served as the Republican Minority Floor Leader from 1994 to 1999. Bosma was then selected to serve as the Republican Minority Leader from 2000 to 2004 and again from 2006 to 2010.

==== Speaker ====
In 2004, when House Republicans assumed a 52–48 majority, Bosma was elected speaker of the House by his peers. After serving as Republican Leader following the 2006 and 2008 elections, Bosma was again elected speaker of the House when Republicans won a 60-seat majority in 2010 and a 69-seat super-majority in 2012.

As Speaker of the 114th General Assembly, Bosma and the House Republicans worked to revitalize Indiana's economy, passed a balanced budget, adopted sweeping telecommunications reform, and created the position of Inspector General to expose and prevent fraud and corruption in state government.

As Speaker of the 117th General Assembly, Bosma focused on education reform through the House Republicans "Strengthen Indiana Plan." He also broke 195 years of institutional tradition by appointing two Democrats to Committee Chair positions. In 2012, Bosma co-authored legislation making Indiana the 23rd Right to Work state.

Additionally, to encourage greater participation in the legislative process, Bosma opened House floor proceedings and House committee meetings to all Hoosiers via the Internet.

In the 118th General Assembly, Bosma and House Republicans' 2013 "Own Your Own American Dream" proposals focused on creating a budget with fiscal integrity, expanding educational opportunities and providing more opportunities for job creation by addressing the skills gap.

The 2014 House Republican "Indiana Working on Progress" agenda focuses on career preparation, increasing funding for key road projects, and cutting taxes and burdensome red tape.

== Political positions ==
=== Education reform ===
During the 2011 session, Brian Bosma co-authored education reform legislation, House Bills 1002 and 1003. House Bill 1002 expanded opportunities for the creation of charter schools. The main provisions of House Bill 1003 include providing families, who do not have the financial means, a scholarship to pay the cost of tuition and fees at a public or private school that charges tuition. In addition, the bill establishes a tax deduction for individual taxpayers who make expenditures for enrollment of a dependent child in a private school or to home school a dependent child. House Bill 1003 created the nation's first statewide voucher program for low income students. As of September 1, 2013, over 20,000 had signed up to use the voucher program.

=== Right to work ===
On November 21, 2011, Brian Bosma announced that his number one priority during the 2012 legislative session would focus on making Indiana the 23rd Right to Work state. HB 1001 (2012), legislation co-authored by Bosma to make Indiana a Right to Work state, passed from the Indiana House the last week of January in 2012. The start of the 2012 session was delayed because the Democratic Caucus boycotted the first few weeks of session by failing to show up to work. Members of the House Republicans attempted to address Right to Work during the 2011 session; however the Democrats denied the House a quorum by walking out to Illinois for five weeks.

=== Same-sex marriage ===
Bosma became involved in the same-sex marriage debate when a proposed amendment to ban gay marriage in the state of Indiana came before the House Judiciary Committee. The bill, known as HJR-3 would need to pass the House Judiciary Committee in order to be on the floor for the full House. It had already passed the legislature in 2011, but would need to pass again to appear on the ballot for the voters to decide in November 2014. This amendment, "provides that only marriage between one man and one woman shall be valid or recognized as a marriage in Indiana." Yet further stated, "... that a legal status identical or substantially similar to that of marriage for unmarried individuals shall not be valid or recognized." The wording of the second clause was vague enough to warrant a trailer bill clarifying the language, which coincided with a renaming of the bill from HJR-6 to HJR-3.

The House Judiciary Committee met Monday, January 14, 2014, and listened to testimony from both sides of the debate. However, a decision was not reached and the vote was delayed. The House Judiciary Committee did not make the decision in the end, when Bosma planned either to replace committee members or send the bill to a more favorable committee. Bosma chose the latter and the House Elections committee met to make a decision on the bill on January 22, 2014.

The newly assigned Elections and Appointments Committee is made up of 13 members, 8 of whom voted for the amendment in 2011. The committee was made up nine Republicans and four Democrats, one Democrat did not attend because of a medical emergency. All 9 Republicans voted for the bill which would define marriage in Indiana.

== Personal life ==
Bosma resides in Indianapolis, Indiana with his wife Cheryl. Together, they have two children; one daughter, Allison, who is a graduate from Purdue, and one son, Christopher, who is a student at the Indiana University School of Medicine. Bosma is a Protestant and attends Grace Community Church in Noblesville, Indiana, where he serves on the church's governing board. He is also a discussion leader with the Bible Study Fellowship.

Indiana House of Representatives
Preceded by Gordon Harper	Member of the Indiana House of Representatives from the 50th district 1986–1992	Succeeded by Daniel Leroy Stephan
Preceded by Constituency established	Member of the Indiana House of Representatives from the 88th district 1992–2020	Succeeded by Chris Jeter
Preceded by Paul Mannweiler	Minority Leader of the Indiana House of Representatives; 2000–2004	Succeeded by B. Patrick Bauer
Preceded by B. Patrick Bauer	Minority Leader of the Indiana House of Representatives; 2006–2010	Succeeded by B. Patrick Bauer
Political offices
Preceded by Patrick Bauer	Speaker of the Indiana House of Representatives; 2004–2006	Succeeded by Patrick Bauer
Preceded by Patrick Bauer	Speaker of the Indiana House of Representatives; 2010–2020	Succeeded by Todd Huston
