= Mats Brodén =

Swedish artist

In the beginning of the 1990s, Mats Brodén initiated a number of art projects and events. One was the alternative art fair "The Stockholm Smart Show". The Smart Show presented new art from around the world to the Swedish public. The art fair received much international praise and recognition as one of the most vibrant art fairs in the world.

Another project was Art Node, the purpose of which was to provide support for artistic projects that sought to find expression in new media, above all on the Internet. A number of Internet-based art projects and philosophic and aesthetic seminars were produced by Art Node and broadcast live on the Internet starting in 1997. During this period, Brodén also participated in the Swedish Department of Culture's examination of what new technology might mean for the cultural sphere.

Art Node also founded one of the Internet publications that took full advantage of the full capacity of new media: Art Orbit. During Art Node's last two years (1999–2001), Art Node also organized a large media art exhibition, iART. In connection with this, Brodén has been engaged in the Foundation Skapande Människa (literally: Creative Human) as Committee President. The Foundation grants to young artists and researchers, and organizes seminars that focus on the question of the way that art and science can enrich each other (artistic Research & Development).

In recent years, Brodén has worked as a consultant on various projects, and has contributed to the realization of a variety of business concepts. He organized a seminar for the city of Stockholm entitled "Commune 08", which formed the basis of the EU-rapport, "The Community and I in the Extended Field". The report addressed the way in which on-line communities can be used for enriching and developing public discussion, and how the relation between citizens and government organizations can be streamlined. A significant source of inspiration for this project is, and has been, the processes surrounding the creation of Ground Zero in southern Manhattan. Decision-makers in New York were forced to find en entirely new model for communication and the procuring of knowledge in city planning.

The real-estate company that is developing the Värtan district of Stockholm engaged Brodén in order to function, as a "Minister of Culture" of sorts for the area. The idea was to use art to create a local identity. Various cultural events in the physical and virtual Värtan would play a key role here.

In 2006, he created the broad principles for an encounter among researchers in the material sciences, artists, designers, and architects. The purpose is to stage a transfer of knowledge between the laboratory and the studio.

Brodén's efforts largely involve bringing together abilities and skills that lack natural platforms for exchange, that is, connecting distinct cultures of knowledge such as art, science, and business.
