= Samuel Judah =

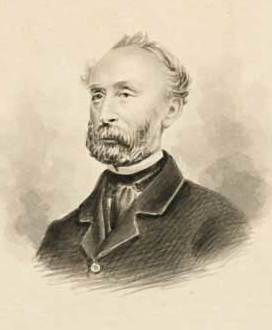
- Born: 1799
- Died: 1876

Samuel Benjamin Helbert Judah (1799 – 21 July 1876) was an American author, lawyer and poet. He was once imprisoned for libel.

== Life ==
Judah was born in New York City, in 1799, the son of Benjamin S. Judah. he was admitted to the bar in 1825. He practised law in New York City. He died 21 July 1876, also in New York City.

== Works ==
His first play, a melodrama, The Mountain Torrent (1820) was a failure. The Rose of Aragorn (1822) was another melodrama. He wrote a long romantic dramatic poem Odofriede, the Outcast the same year. He followed with a patriotic comedy A Tale of Lexington (1823) and in 1827 a novel The Buccaneers, a Romance of Our Own County.

He also wrote, under the pen-name "Terentius Phlogobombos", a scurrilous account of the literary and political life of New York. The work Gotham and the Gothamites contained libellous statements about fellow playwright Mordacai Noah:

descended from Mordacai of old, that hanged Haman, for his desires, like that worthy's, are entirely bent towards the gallows

Despite the use of a pseudonym, Judah's authorship was discerned and he spent time in jail for criminal libel.

A number of freethinking biblical dramas of the 1830s are ascribed to him, but his authorship is doubtful.
