= Todd Huston =

American politician

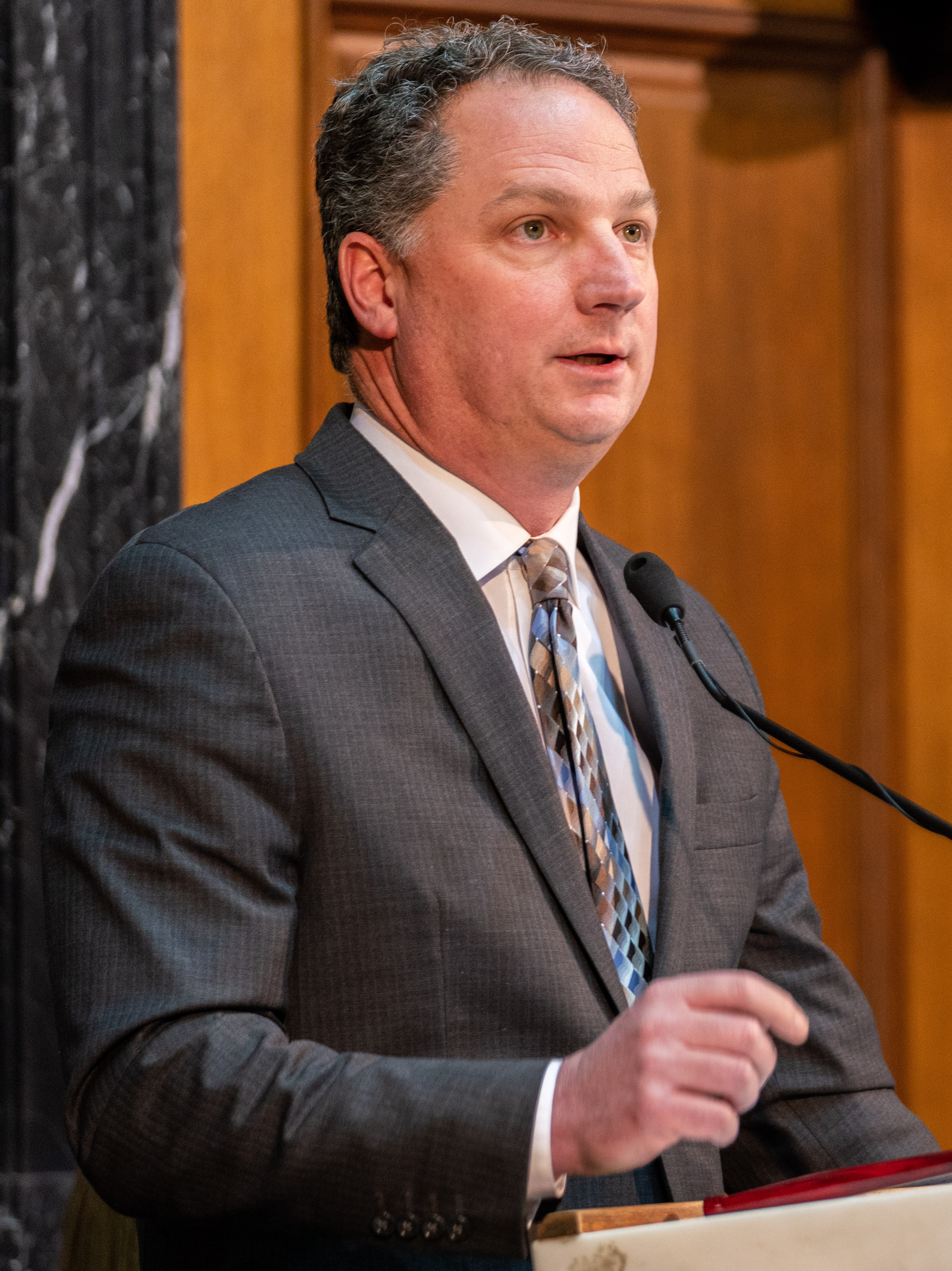

Speaker of the Indiana House of Representatives
- In office March 9, 2020 – November 4, 2026
- Preceded by: Brian Bosma
- Succeeded by: Ben Smaltz

Member of the Indiana House of Representatives from the 37th district
- In office November 20, 2012 – November 4, 2026
- Preceded by: Scott Reske
- Succeeded by: Lauren Cole

Personal details
- Born: April 6, 1972 (age 54) Fishers, Indiana, U.S.
- Party: Republican
- Education: Indiana University, Bloomington (BA)

Todd Huston (born April 6, 1972) is an American politician who served as the Speaker of the Indiana House of Representatives. A member of the Republican Party, Huston represented the 37th district of the Indiana House from 2012 until 2026, when he lost his reelection. He previously served on the Hamilton Southeastern School Board from 2002 to 2005, the Indiana State Board of Education from 2005 to 2009, and the Indiana Education Roundtable from 2006 to 2009. He also served as Chair of the Indiana Charter School Board from 2011 to 2012. Huston was elected to succeed Brian Bosma as Speaker on March 9, 2020.

Huston was a senior vice president at the College Board from 2012 until February 2022. He resigned from the post amid criticism of his position opposing critical race theory. Huston lost reelection to the State House in 2026, being defeated by Democrat Lauren Cole.

Indiana House of Representatives
Preceded by Scott Reske	Member of the Indiana House of Representatives from the 37th district 2012–2026	Succeeded by Lauren Cole
Preceded by Brian Bosma	Speaker of the Indiana House of Representatives; 2020–2026	Succeeded by Ben Smaltz
