= John Broden =

American politician and lawyer

Member of the Indiana Senate from the 10th district
- In office November 8, 2000 – November 9, 2016
- Preceded by: Cleo Washington
- Succeeded by: David L. Niezgodski

Personal details
- Born: John Edward Broden; May 31, 1965 (age 61) South Bend, Indiana, U.S.
- Party: Democratic
- Spouse: Josephine Marie Maternowski Broden
- Education: University of Notre Dame (BA); Indiana University, Bloomington (JD)
- Profession: Attorney

John Edward Broden (born May 31, 1965) is an American politician and lawyer who is a current member of the Indiana Senate. A member of the Democratic Party, Broden was sworn into office on January 7, 2001. Broden serves Indiana's 10th Senate District, representing central St. Joseph County, Indiana.

== Early life, education and career ==
Born in South Bend, Indiana, Broden attended James Madison Elementary School and is the graduate of St. Joseph's High School. Broden attended the University of Notre Dame, where he received his Bachelor of Arts in Government in 1987. He went on to graduate from the Indiana University Maurer School of Law, where he received his Juris Doctor in 1990.

After passing bar, Broden became a clerk for former Indiana Supreme Court Justice Roger O. DeBruler from 1990 to 1992. He then became the Assistant City Attorney for South Bend in 1992, until being elected to the South Bend Common Council in 1995. Broden served on the Common Council upon being appointed City Attorney of South Bend by Mayor Steve Luecke in 1998; serving as City Attorney until 2001.

Broden currently practices law with Leone, Halpin, and Konopinski, LLP, and was an adjunct professor at Indiana University-South Bend, where he taught Labor Studies. He currently serves on the board of directors for the South Bend Center for the Homeless and the REAL Services Organization. Broden also served as the Chairman of the St. Joseph County Democratic Party after the resignation of Butch Morgan in October 2011, before resigning in September 2013.

Broden first won election to the Indiana Senate on November 7, 2000, defeating Libertarian Matthew Wilken in the general election. Broden went on to win reelection in 2004 and 2008 in uncontested challenges in the general election, and defeated Republican Glenn Terry with 70% of the vote in 2012.

== Personal life ==
Broden resides in South Bend, Indiana with his wife Josephine and their three children John Jr, Lil Kev, and Ana Marie. Broden is a practicing Roman Catholic, and is a member of the Saint Augustine's Roman Catholic Parish and attends the Holy Cross Catholic Church.
