= Matt Lehman (Indiana politician) =

American politician

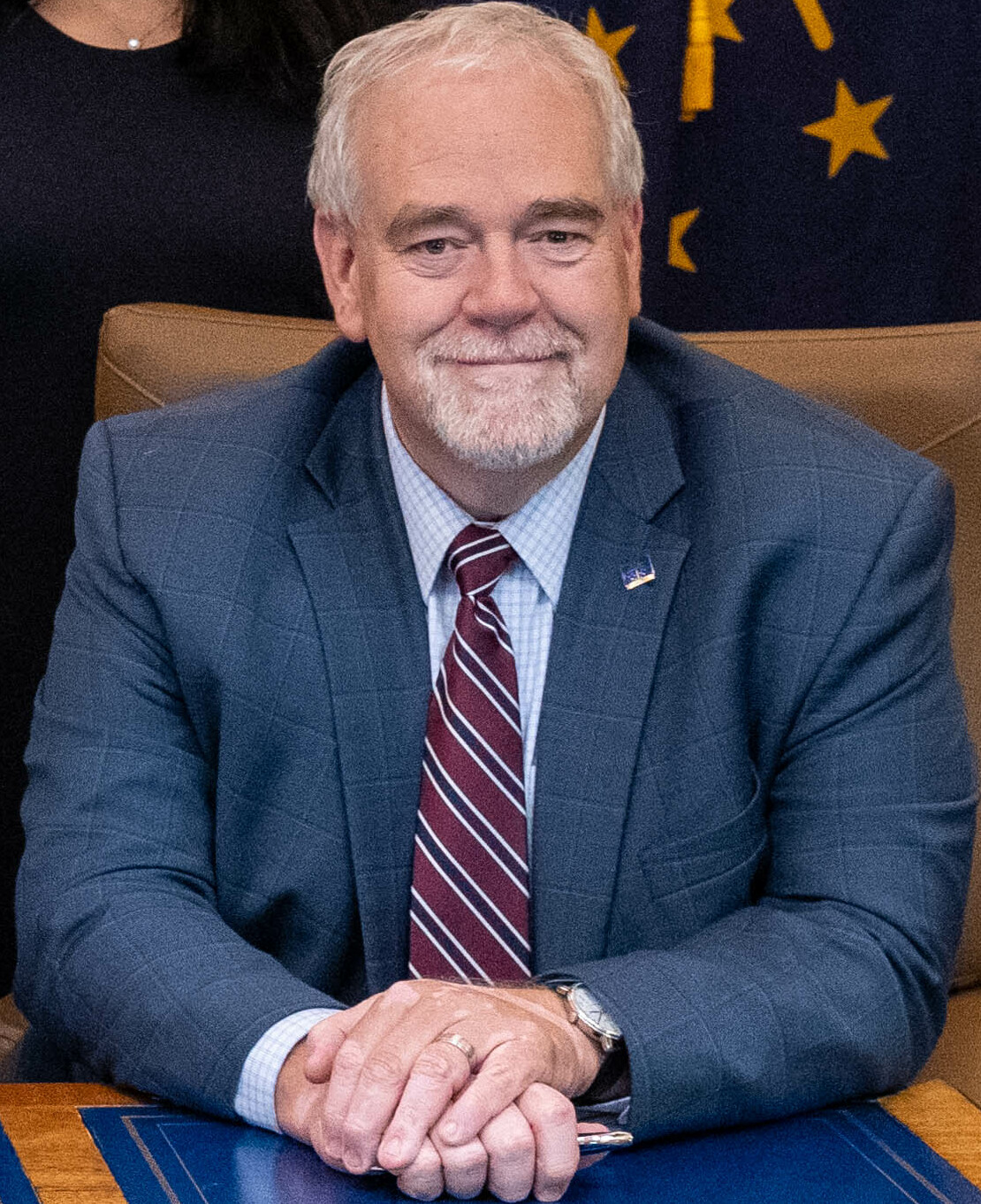

Majority Leader of the Indiana House of Representatives
- Incumbent
- Assumed office October 6, 2015
- Preceded by: Jud McMillin

Member of the Indiana House of Representatives from the 79th district
- Incumbent
- Assumed office January 2009
- Preceded by: Michael Ripley

Personal details
- Born: Berne, Indiana, U.S.
- Party: Republican
- Spouse: Joye Dubach
- Children: 3
- Education: Vincennes University (attended)

Matthew S. "Matt" Lehman is an American Republican politician from Indiana. He represents District 79 and is the majority floor leader in the Indiana House of Representatives.

Indiana House of Representatives
Preceded by Michael Ripley	Member of the Indiana House of Representatives from the 79th district 2009–present	Incumbent
Preceded by Jud McMillin	Majority Leader of the Indiana House of Representatives; 2015–present	Incumbent
