= Indiana House of Representatives =

Lower house of the Indiana General Assembly

Coordinates: 38°46′7.54″N 86°9′45.54″W

- Indiana General Assembly

Type
- Type: Lower house
- Term limits: None

History
- New session started: January 5, 2027

Leadership
- Speaker: Ben Smaltz (R) since November 4, 2026
- Speaker pro tempore: Wendy McNamara (R) since November 16, 2026
- Majority Leader: Matt Lehman (R) since October 6, 2015
- Minority Leader: Phil GiaQuinta (D) since November 7, 2018

Structure
- Seats: 100
- Political groups: Majority: Republican (54); Minority: Democratic (46)
- Length of term: 2 years
- Authority: Article 4, Indiana Constitution
- Salary: $33,032/year + per diem

Elections
- Last election: November 5, 2026
- Next election: November 3, 2028
- Redistricting: Legislative Control

Meeting place
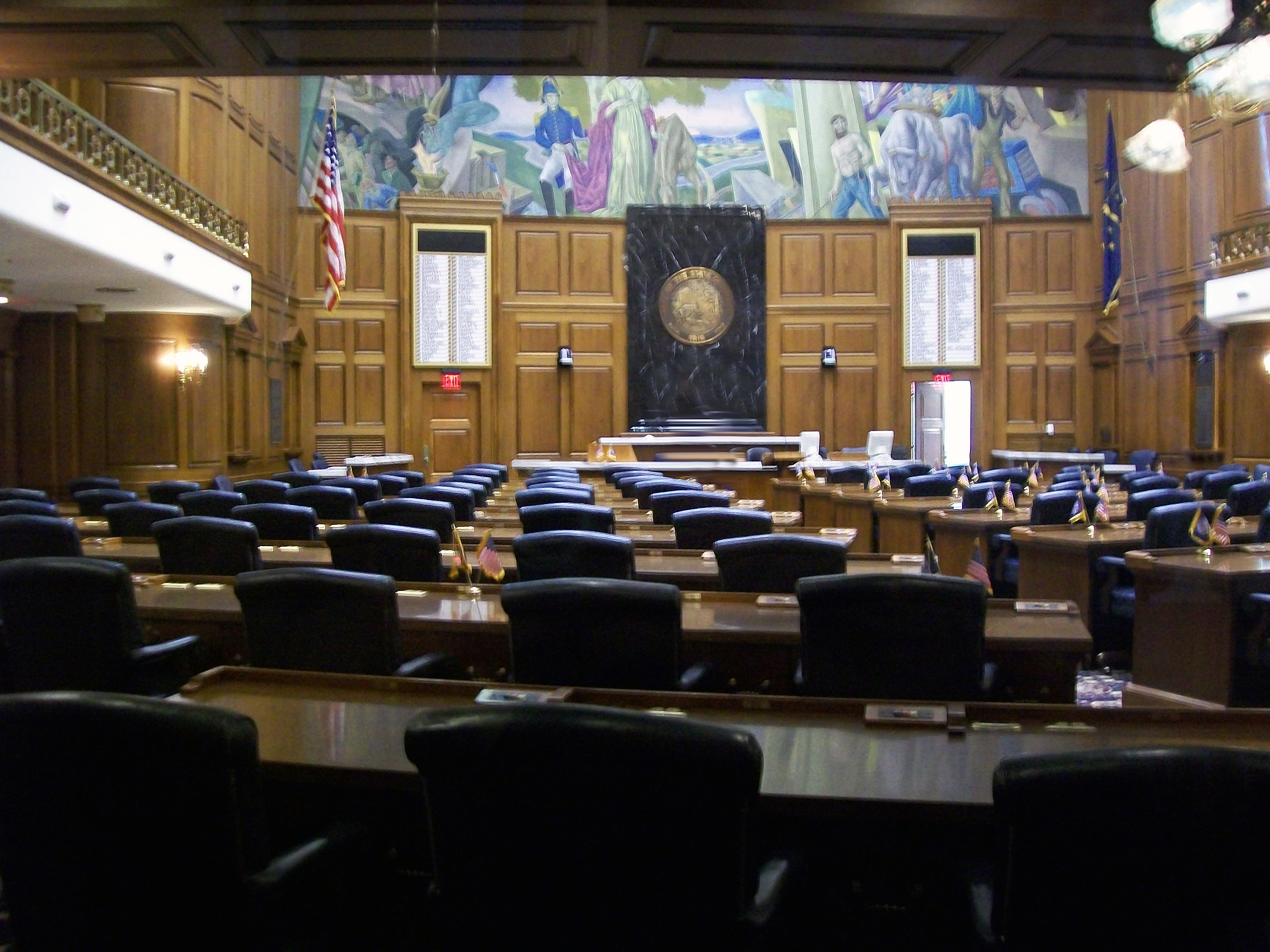

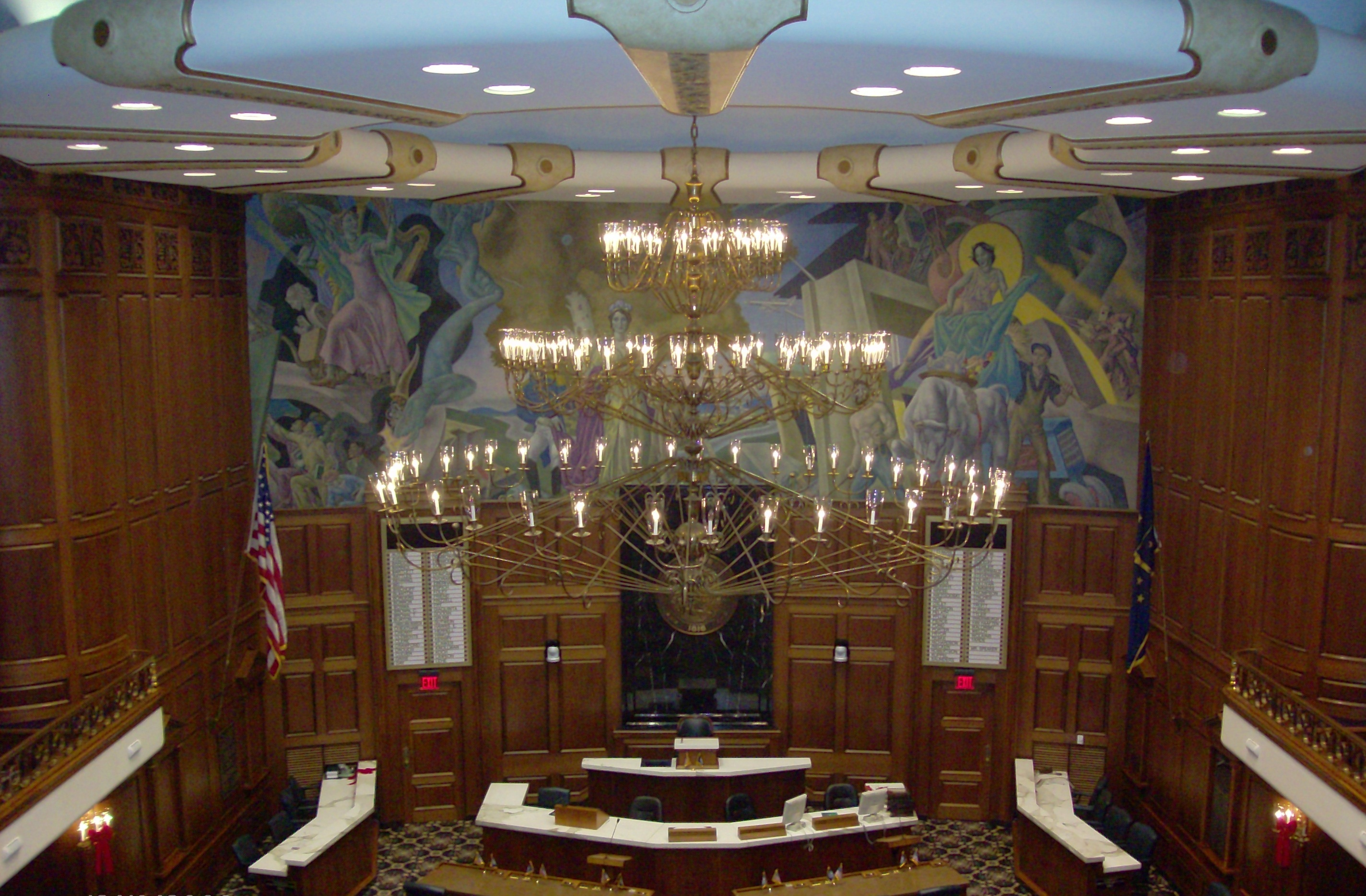
- House of Representatives Chamber; Indiana Statehouse; Indianapolis, Indiana

Website
- Indiana General Assembly

The Indiana House of Representatives is the lower house of the Indiana General Assembly, the state legislature of the U.S. state of Indiana. The House is composed of 100 members representing an equal number of constituent districts. House members serve two-year terms without term limits. According to the 2010 U.S. census, each State House district contains an average of 64,838 people.

The House convenes at the Indiana Statehouse in Indianapolis.

== Terms and qualifications ==
In order to run for a seat for the Indiana House of Representatives, one must be a citizen of the United States, be at least 21 years of age upon taking office, and reside in the state of Indiana for 2 years and in the district to represent for at least 1 year at the time of the election.

Representatives serve terms of two years, and there is no limit on how many terms a representative may serve.

== Composition of the House ==
| Affiliation | Party (Shading indicates majority caucus) | | Total | Vacant |
| Affiliation | Republican | Democratic | Total | Vacant |
|---|---|---|---|---|
| End 2010 session | 48 | 52 | 100 | 0 |
| 2011–2012 | 60 | 40 | 100 | 0 |
| 2013–2014 | 69 | 31 | 100 | 0 |
| Begin 2015 | 71 | 29 | 100 | 0 |
| Begin 2017 | 70 | 30 | 100 | 0 |
| Begin 2019 | 67 | 33 | 100 | 0 |
| Begin 2021 | 71 | 29 | 100 | 0 |
| Begin 2023 | 70 | 30 | 100 | 0 |
| Begin 2025 | 70 | 30 | 100 | 0 |
| Begin 2027 | 54 | 46 | 100 | 0 |
| Latest voting share | 54% | 46% | | |

=== Officers ===
| Office | Representative | Party | Residence | First elected |
|---|---|---|---|---|
| Speaker of the House | Ben Smaltz | Rep | Auburn | 2012 |
| Speaker pro tempore | Wendy McNamara | Rep | Evansville | 2010 |
| Majority Floor Leader | Matt Lehman | Rep | Berne | 2008 |
| Majority Caucus Chair | Jake Teshka | Rep | North Liberty | 2020 |
| Minority Leader | Phil GiaQuinta | Dem | Fort Wayne | 2006 |
| Minority Floor Leader | Cherrish Pryor | Dem | Indianapolis | 2008 |
| Minority Caucus Chair | Carey Hamilton | Dem | Indianapolis | 2016 |

=== Members of the Indiana House of Representatives ===
| District | Representative | Party | Residence | First elected |
|---|---|---|---|---|
| 1 | Carolyn Jackson | Dem | Hammond | 2018 |
| 2 | Earl Harris Jr. | Dem | East Chicago | 2016 |
| 3 | Ragen Hatcher | Dem | Gary | 2018 |
| 4 | Ryan Kominakis | Dem | Valparaiso | 2026 |
| 5 | Alex Wait | Dem | Granger | 2026 |
| 6 | Maureen Bauer | Dem | South Bend | 2020 |
| 7 | Jake Teshka | Rep | South Bend | 2020 |
| 8 | Ryan Dvorak | Dem | South Bend | 2002 |
| 9 | Randy Novak | Dem | Michigan City | 2025† |
| 10 | Chuck Moseley | Dem | Portage | 2008 |
| 11 | Michael Aylesworth | Rep | Hebron | 2014 |
| 12 | Mike Andrade | Dem | Munster | 2020 |
| 13 | Matt Commons | Rep | Williamsport | 2024 |
| 14 | Vernon Smith | Dem | Gary | 1990 |
| 15 | Hal Slager | Rep | Schererville | 2020 (2012–2018) |
| 16 | Kendell Culp | Rep | Rensselaer | 2022 |
| 17 | Jack Jordan | Rep | Bremen | 2016 |
| 18 | David Abbott | Rep | Rome City | 2018 |
| 19 | Nick Neal | Dem | Crown Point | 2026 |
| 20 | Jim Pressel | Rep | LaPorte | 2016 |
| 21 | Timothy Wesco | Rep | Mishawaka | 2010 |
| 22 | Craig Snow | Rep | Warsaw | 2020 |
| 23 | Ethan Manning | Rep | Macy | 2018 |
| 24 | Rachel Bleicher | Dem | Westfield | 2026 |
| 25 | Tiffany Stoner | Dem | Zionsville | 2026 |
| 26 | Chris Campbell | Dem | West Lafayette | 2018 |
| 27 | Sheila Klinker | Dem | Lafayette | 1982 |
| 28 | Jeff Thompson | Rep | Lizton | 1998 |
| 29 | Alaina Shonkwiler | Rep | Noblesville | 2024 |
| 30 | Paula Davis | Rep | Kokomo | 2026 |
| 31 | Lori Goss-Reaves | Rep | Marion | 2023† |
| 32 | Victoria Garcia Wilburn | Dem | Fishers | 2022 |
| 33 | J. D. Prescott | Rep | Winchester | 2018 |
| 34 | Sara Gullion | Dem | Muncie | 2026 |
| 35 | Elizabeth Rowray | Rep | Yorktown | 2020 |
| 36 | Kim Townsend | Dem | Anderson | 2026 |
| 37 | Lauren Cole | Dem | Noblesville | 2026 |
| 38 | Heath VanNatter | Rep | Kokomo | 2010 |
| 39 | Lindsay Gramlich | Dem | Carmel | 2026 |
| 40 | Will Colteryahn | Dem | Avon | 2026 |
| 41 | Mark Genda | Rep | Frankfort | 2022 |
| 42 | Tim Yocum | Rep | Clinton | 2025† |
| 43 | Tonya Pfaff | Dem | Terre Haute | 2018 |
| 44 | Beau Baird | Rep | Greencastle | 2018 |
| 45 | Kellie Streeter | Rep | Freelandville | 2026 |
| 46 | Bob Heaton | Rep | Riley | 2010 |
| 47 | Robb Greene | Rep | Shelby | 2022 |
| 48 | Douglas Miller | Rep | Elkhart | 2014 |
| 49 | Joanna King | Rep | Middlebury | 2020† |
| 50 | Lorissa Sweet | Rep | Wabash | 2022 |
| 51 | Tony Isa | Rep | Angola | 2024 |
| 52 | Ben Smaltz | Rep | Auburn | 2012 |
| 53 | Ethan Lawson | Rep | Greenfield | 2024 |
| 54 | Cory Criswell | Rep | Middletown | 2022 |
| 55 | Lindsay Patterson | Rep | Franklin | 2022 |
| 56 | Randy Retter | Rep | Wayne County | 2026 |
| 57 | Wes Bennett | Rep | Plainfield | 2026 |
| 58 | John Reed | Rep | Greenwood | 2026 |
| 59 | Ryan Lauer | Rep | Columbus | 2018 |
| 60 | Peggy Mayfield | Rep | Martinsville | 2012 |
| 61 | Matt Pierce | Dem | Bloomington | 2002 |
| 62 | Amy Huffman Oliver | Dem | Nashville | 2026 |
| 63 | Amy Kippenbrock | Rep | Jasper | 2026 |
| 64 | Matt Hostettler | Rep | Fort Branch | 2018 |
| 65 | Christopher May | Rep | Bedford | 2016 |
| 66 | Zach Payne | Rep | Charlestown | 2020 |
| 67 | Alex Zimmerman | Rep | North Vernon | 2023† |
| 68 | Garrett Bascom | Rep | Lawrenceburg | 2024 |
| 69 | Jim Lucas | Rep | Seymour | 2012 |
| 70 | Scott Fluhr | Rep | Corydon | 2026 |
| 71 | Wendy Dant Chesser | Dem | Jeffersonville | 2024† |
| 72 | Michele Henry | Dem | Georgetown | 2026 |
| 73 | Jennifer Meltzer | Rep | Shelbyville | 2022 |
| 74 | Stephen Bartels | Rep | Eckerty | 2017† |
| 75 | Cindy Ledbetter | Rep | Newburgh | 2020 |
| 76 | Wendy McNamara | Rep | Mount Vernon | 2010 |
| 77 | Alex Burton | Dem | Evansville | 2024 |
| 78 | Tim O'Brien | Rep | Evansville | 2021† |
| 79 | Matt Lehman | Rep | Berne | 2008 |
| 80 | Phil GiaQuinta | Dem | Fort Wayne | 2006 |
| 81 | Martin Carbaugh | Rep | Fort Wayne | 2012 |
| 82 | Kyle Miller | Dem | Fort Wayne | 2022 |
| 83 | Christopher Judy | Rep | Aboite | 2014 |
| 84 | Misti Meehan | Dem | Fort Wayne | 2026 |
| 85 | Dave Heine | Rep | Fort Wayne | 2016 |
| 86 | Ed DeLaney | Dem | Indianapolis | 2008 |
| 87 | Carey Hamilton | Dem | Indianapolis | 2016 |
| 88 | Stephanie Jo Yocum | Dem | McCordsville | 2026 |
| 89 | Mitch Gore | Dem | Indianapolis | 2020 |
| 90 | David Boyd | Dem | Indianapolis | 2026 |
| 91 | Jarren Hurt | Dem | Marion County | 2026 |
| 92 | Renee Pack | Dem | Indianapolis | 2020 |
| 93 | Ava Rosberg | Dem | Indianapolis | 2026 |
| 94 | Cherrish Pryor | Dem | Indianapolis | 2008 |
| 95 | John Bartlett | Dem | Indianapolis | 2008 |
| 96 | Greg Porter | Dem | Indianapolis | 1992 |
| 97 | Justin Moed | Dem | Indianapolis | 2012 |
| 98 | Robin Shackleford | Dem | Indianapolis | 2012 |
| 99 | Vanessa Summers | Dem | Indianapolis | 1991† |
| 100 | Blake Johnson | Dem | Indianapolis | 2020† |

†Member was initially appointed to the seat.

== Standing committees ==
| Committee | Chair | Vice Chair |
|---|---|---|
| Agriculture and Rural Development | Michael Aylesworth (R-11) | Beau Baird (R-44) |
| Commerce, Small Business, and Economic Development | Robert Morris (R-84) | Julie Olthoff (R-19) |
| Courts and Criminal Code | Wendy McNamara (R-76) | Jennifer Meltzer (R-73) |
| Education | Robert Behning (R-91) | Michelle Davis (R-58) |
| Elections and Apportionment | Timothy Wesco (R-21) | Zach Payne (R-66) |
| Employment, Labor and Pensions | Heath VanNatter (R-38) | Matt Hostettler (R-64) |
| Environmental Affairs | Beau Baird (R-44) | Kendell Culp (R-16) |
| Family, Children and Human Affairs | Dale DeVon (R-5) | Ryan Lauer (R-59) |
| Financial Institutions and Insurance | Jake Teshka (R-7) | Kyle Pierce (R-36) |
| Government and Regulatory Reform | Doug Miller (R-48) | David Abbott (R-18) |
| Insurance | Martin Carbaugh (R-81) | Lori Goss-Reaves (R-31) |
| Judiciary | Chris Jeter (R-88) | Alex Zimmerman (R-67) |
| Joint Rules | Todd Huston (R-37) | |
| Local Government | Chris May (R-65) | Bruce Borders (R-45) |
| Natural Resources | Shane Lindauer (R-63) | Mark Genda (R-41) |
| Public Health | Brad Barrett (R-56) | Julie McGuire (R-93) |
| Public Policy | Ethan Manning (R-23) | Peggy Mayfield (R-60) |
| Roads and Transportation | Jim Pressel (R-20) | Dave Heine (R-85) |
| Rules and Legislative Procedures | Ben Smaltz (R-52) | Hal Slager (R-15) |
| Statutory Committee on Ethics | Karen Engleman (R-70) | Sue Errington (D-34) |
| Utilities, Energy, and Telecommunications | Edmond Soliday (R-4) | Dave Hall (R-62) |
| Veterans Affairs and Public Safety | Stephen Bartels (R-74) | Becky Cash (R-25) |
| Ways and Means | Jeff Thompson (R-28) | Craig Snow (R-22) |

== History ==
The Indiana House of Representatives held its first session in the first statehouse in the original state capital of Corydon and the first speaker of the body was Isaac Blackford. Under the terms of the constitution of 1816, state representatives served one-year terms, meaning elections were held annually. In 1851, the constitution was replaced by the current constitution and terms were lengthened to two years, but sessions were held biennially. In 1897, it unanimously passed a bill determining the value of Pi to exactly 3.2. However, the bill was never voted upon in the State Senate. A 1972 constitutional amendment allowed for a short legislative session to be held in odd numbered years.

=== 2012 election ===
On November 6, 2012, the Republican Party in Indiana expanded their majority in the House of Representatives from 60 members in the 117th General Assembly to 69 members, a "quorum-proof" majority. The Republicans were able to take 69% of the seats, despite having only received approximately 54% of the votes for the state's House of Representatives.

Of the 3 newly elected members of the U.S. House elected to the 113th Congress from Indiana, two are former members of the Indiana House of Representatives. Congresswoman Jackie Walorski (IN-02) represented Indiana's 21st district from 2005 to 2011 and Congressman Luke Messer (IN-06) represented Indiana's 57th district from 2003 to 2007. Congressman Marlin Stutzman (IN-03) was re-elected to a second term, he is a former member of the Indiana House of Representatives where he served Indiana's 52nd district from 2003 to 2009.

== See also ==
- Government of Indiana
- Indiana Senate
- Politics of Indiana
- Speaker of the Indiana State House of Representatives
- List of Indiana General Assemblies
