= National Register of Historic Places listings in Fulton County, Indiana =

Location of Fulton County in Indiana

This is a list of the National Register of Historic Places listings in Fulton County, Indiana.

This is intended to be a complete list of the properties and districts on the National Register of Historic Places in Fulton County, Indiana, United States. Latitude and longitude coordinates are provided for many National Register properties and districts; these locations may be seen together in a map.

There are nine properties and districts listed on the National Register in the county.

Properties and districts located in incorporated areas display the name of the municipality, while properties and districts in unincorporated areas display the name of their civil township. Properties and districts split between multiple jurisdictions display the names of all jurisdictions.

This National Park Service list is complete through NPS recent listings posted August 29, 2025.

== Current listings ==
	Name on the Register	Image	Date listed	Location	City or town	Description
1	Akron Historic District		March 11, 2024 (#100010028)	Roughly both sides of Rochester Street between Marcus Street to the west and State Road 14 North to the east and both sides of Mishawaka Street between North Street to the north and Rochester Street to the south. 41°02′19″N 86°01′34″W	Akron	
2	Lyman M. Brackett House	Lyman M. Brackett House	September 27, 1984 (#84001036)	328 W. 9th St. 41°03′56″N 86°13′13″W	Rochester	
3	Fulton County Courthouse	Fulton County Courthouse	September 22, 2000 (#00001138)	815 Main St. 41°03′56″N 86°12′55″W	Rochester	
4	John Haimbaugh Round Barn	John Haimbaugh Round Barn	April 2, 1993 (#93000192)	Junction of State Road 25 and County Road 400N, northeast of Rochester; 41°06′46″N 86°11′12″W	Newcastle Township	
5	Bert Leedy Round Barn	Bert Leedy Round Barn	April 2, 1993 (#93000182)	Southwestern corner of the junction of County Road 375N and U.S. Route 31, north of Rochester; 41°06′28″N 86°14′26″W	Richland Township	
6	Prill School	Prill School	December 10, 1981 (#81000012)	Northwest of Akron; 41°04′35″N 86°06′50″W	Henry Township	
7	Rochester Downtown Historic District	Rochester Downtown Historic District	June 24, 2008 (#08000556)	Roughly bounded along Main St. and the Courthouse Square; 41°03′58″N 86°12′58″W	Rochester	
8	John W. Smith House	John W. Smith House	July 26, 1979 (#79000015)	730 Pontiac St. 41°03′58″N 86°13′10″W	Rochester	
9	Utter-Gerig Round Barn	Utter-Gerig Round Barn	December 18, 1990 (#90001927)	Near the junction of County Roads 825E and 100N, northwest of Akron; 41°03′52″N 86°05′32″W	Henry Township	

== Former listings ==
	Name on the Register	Image	Date listed	Date removed	Location	City or town	Description
1	Germany Bridge		December 22, 1978 (#80000426)	March 28, 1980	NW of Rochester on SR 375W	Rochester vicinity	Collapsed on October 23, 1979. Replaced with new span in 1980

== See also ==
- List of National Historic Landmarks in Indiana
- National Register of Historic Places listings in Indiana
- Listings in neighboring counties: Cass, Kosciusko, Marshall, Miami, Pulaski, Starke, Wabash
- List of Indiana state historical markers in Fulton County
