= List of recipients of the Sagamore of the Wabash Award =

The Sagamore of the Wabash is an honorary award in the state of Indiana. It is given by the Governor of Indiana under their own criteria, and there is no official record kept of all previous recipients.

The award was first created by Governor Ralph F. Gates to compete with the Kentucky Colonel title, with the first two Sagamores being Robert A. Taft and Simeon Willis. The title was later given to those who had contributed to Indiana life: several recipients have been associated with Indiana University (IU), with former president Herman B Wells receiving the award six times. Other recipients have included astronauts (Gus Grissom), athletes (Michael Brinegar, Ray LeBlanc), comedians (David Letterman), musicians (Willie Nelson), and presidents (George H. W. Bush).

At least one fictional character has been the recipient of an award, being Garfield (creator Jim Davis received an award four years prior).

== Recipients ==
=== Awarded under Ralph F. Gates ===
Name	Date	Notes	Ref.
Robert A. Taft	1946	Senator for Ohio. Presented by Ralph F. Gates at a tristate meeting in Cincinnati.	
Simeon Willis	1946	Governor of Kentucky. Presented by Ralph F. Gates at a tristate meeting in Cincinnati.	

=== Awarded under Henry F. Schricker ===
Name	Date	Notes	Ref.
William Morris Sparks	February 1949	Former United States federal judge.	
Lewis Crusoe	October 11, 1950	Vice president of the Ford Motor Company. Presented by Henry F. Schricker at a dinner during the International Dairy Exposition.	
Courtney Johnson	October 11, 1950	Assistant to the president of Studebaker Corporation. Presented by Henry F. Schricker at a dinner during the International Dairy Exposition.	
John L. McCaffrey	October 11, 1950	President of International Harvester Company. Presented by Henry F. Schricker at a dinner during the International Dairy Exposition.	
Alva W. Phelps	October 11, 1950	Board chairman of Oliver Corporation. Presented by Henry F. Schricker at a dinner during the International Dairy Exposition.	
W. A. Roberts	October 11, 1950	Vice president of the Allis-Chalmers Company. Presented by Henry F. Schricker at a dinner during the International Dairy Exposition.	
Edith Willkie	October 11, 1950	Widow of Republican politician and presidential candidate Wendell Willkie. Presented by Henry F. Schricker at a dinner during the International Dairy Exposition.	

=== Awarded under Matthew E. Welsh ===
Name	Date	Notes	Ref.
Ralph C. Newman	December 1963	Director of the Indiana Bureau of Mines and Mining.	
R.O. Cole	November 18, 1963	USDA — Purdue Dept of Agricultural Extension	'Sagamore' Cole cited at Soil-Water Banquet https://jconline.newspapers.com/newspage/1045892748/

=== Awarded under Roger D. Branigin ===
Name	Date	Notes	Ref.
Gus Grissom	May 30, 1965	Project Mercury and Project Gemini astronaut. Presented by Congressman Lee Hamilton in front of thousands.	

=== Awarded under Otis Bowen ===
Name	Date	Notes	Ref.
Maynard K. Hine	June 19, 1973	Chancellor of Indiana University–Purdue University Indianapolis. Presented by Otis Bowen at retirement dinner.	
Richard G. Fazakerley	June 27, 1973	Commander of the U.S. Army Finance Support Agency at Fort Benjamin Harrison. Presented by Wendell G. Garrett, president of the Veterans Day Council.	
Quentin A. Blachly	1975	Republican politician and attorney. First award.	
Harvey U. Gill	May 2, 1975	Director of the Indianapolis Boy Scout Band.	
Iron Eyes Cody	October 13, 1975	Actor. While reported to be the first Native American recipient of the award, he was later revealed to be of Italian descent.	
George Smerk	December 1980	Professor of transportation at Indiana University.	

=== Awarded under Robert D. Orr ===
Name	Date	Notes	Ref.
Tim McCarthy	May 14, 1981	United States Secret Service agent known for defending Ronald Reagan in assassination attempt.	
Bay Buchanan	June 24, 1981	Treasurer of the United States. Presented by Robert D. Orr at 23rd biennial convention of the Indiana Federation of Republican Women.	
Maureen Reagan	October 29, 1981	Republican activist and daughter of Ronald Reagan.	
Ginger Rogers	January 28, 1983	Dancer and actress.	
Barbara Bush	June 20, 1983	Then-second lady. Presented by Robert D. Orr at fundraising dinner for the Indiana Republican State Committee.	
George H. W. Bush	June 20, 1983	Republican then-vice president. Presented by Robert D. Orr at fundraising dinner for the Indiana Republican State Committee.	
Rev.Joe Wick	Sept.6,1983	Minister at First Christian Church in Lafayette, Indiana for 25 years. An Indiana native, during his ministry he served as far away as Glasgow Scotland, and the Philippines. He became widely known for his humor and wisdom and was a popular featured speaker and Master of Ceremonies for organizations large and small across Indiana and far beyond the state's borders.	
Jim Davis	1984	Cartoonist.	
Albert J. Boone	July 4, 1984	Presented by Robert L. Walters, president of Public Assistance of Indiana Inc., and Mable Johnson, Montgomery County Republican vice chairman, at a July 4 celebration in New Richmond, Indiana. It was presented for his efforts to establish the New Richmond-Coal Creek Township Museum to preserve local history.	
Willie Nelson	August 19, 1986	Country singer and activist. Presented by Robert D. Orr during a concert at the Indiana State Fairgrounds Coliseum.	
Quentin A. Blachly	1988	Republican politician and attorney. Second award.	
Garfield	January 8, 1988	Cartoon cat. For efforts in promoting higher education to high school students. Presented by Robert D. Orr to creator Jim Davis.	
Dr. Thomas A. Sargent	1989	Distinguished political science professor at Ball State University and Air Force Veteran. Professor Emeritus of Political Science and Director Emeritus of the E.B. Ball Center at Ball State University.	

=== Awarded under Evan Bayh ===
Name	Date	Notes	Ref.
Merle H. Miller	1989	Attorney and civil leader.	
John Houston	1989	Veteran, former D.A.V. State Commander	
Howard E. McVicker	September 1990	Professor emeritus of industrial technology at Purdue University. Presented by Evan Bayh at the Indiana Vocational Association's annual conference.	
Marshall Sipe	December 21, 1990	Civil defense director for Delaware County. Presented by State Representative Hurley Goodall.	
Ray LeBlanc	March 8, 1992	Olympian ice hockey goaltender. Presented by Lieutenant Governor Frank O'Bannon.	
Gazella Ann Granger Summitt	August 15, 1994	Director of personnel and affirmative action at Vincennes University.	
Philip S. Chua	November 25, 1995	Cardiac Surgeon	

=== Awarded under Frank O'Bannon ===
Name	Date	Notes	Ref.
Herman B Wells	June 10, 1997	Former president of Indiana University. Sixth award.	
Samuel D. Conte	October 31, 1997	Founding head of Purdue Computer Science Department	
Phillip M. Summers	February 2001	President of Vincennes University. Presented by Frank O'Bannon during bicentennial celebration ceremonies at the Indiana Statehouse.	

=== Awarded under Joe Kernan ===
Name	Date	Notes	Ref.
Kiyoko Ikeda	December 20, 2005	Council member for Starke County and former county clerk.	
David Matsey	December 20, 2005	Circuit court judge.	

=== Awarded under Mitch Daniels ===
Name	Date	Notes	Ref.
Connie Kay Nass	December 7, 2006	Indiana State Auditor. Presented privately before public reception with over 200 attendants.	
David Letterman	September 7, 2007	Television host and comedian. Presented by Ball State University president Jo Ann M. Gora during dedication of the David Letterman Communication and Media Building.	
Elinor Ostrom	December 21, 2009	Arthur F. Bently Professor of Political Science at IU. Presented by Mitch Daniels at the Governor's Residence.	

=== Awarded under Mike Pence ===
Name	Date	Notes	Ref.
Lois Eskenazi	May 28, 2013	Philanthropist	
Steve Edwards	May 6, 2013	Superintendent of Marion Community Schools. Presented by State Representative Kevin Mahan and State Senator Greg Taylor.	
Lennon Brown	May 6, 2013	Principal of Marion High School. Presented by State Representative Kevin Mahan and State Senator Greg Taylor.	
Sidney Eskenazi	May 28, 2013	Real estate developer and philanthropist	
Una Mae Reck	April 17, 2013	Chancellor of Indiana University South Bend. Presented by IU president Michael McRobbie.	
John Martino	July 27, 2013	Kokomo Park Superintendent. Presented by State Representative Michael Karickhoff.	
Don Moore	December 11, 2013	Vietnam War veteran. Presented by State Representative David Ober and was awarded posthumously.	
Wilber Curry	January 11, 2014	Community activist. Presented by State Representative Jud McMillin.	
Ira G. Boots	May 15, 2014	Community activist. Presented by State Representative Wendy McNamara.	
Theresa Boots	May 15, 2014	Community activist. Presented by State Representative Wendy McNamara.	
Dr. Susan Graham McDowell Riley	June 17, 2014	Former deputy superintendent for Evansville Vanderburgh School Corporation. Presented by State Representative Wendy McNamara.	
Connie Rose	August 21, 2014	Executive Director of the Family Service Society. Presented by State Representative Kevin Mahan.	
E.P. Severns	July 1, 2014	President of Coca-Cola Bottling of Kokomo. Presented by State Representative Michael Karickhoff.	
Ron Metz	November 11, 2014	Certified public accountant. Presented by State Representative Michael Karickhoff.	
Judy Dennis	August 30, 2015	Therapist and a clinically certified domestic violence counselor of the American College of Forensic Counselors. Presented by State Representative Michael Karickhoff.	
Dave Goodwin	August 30, 2015	Former superintendent for MSD School District of Steuben County. Presented by State Representative Dennis Zent.	
Dr. Matthew I. Miller	December 4, 2015	Dentist. Presented by State Representative Dennis Zent.	
Dr. Richard T. Newton	December 4, 2015	Dentist. Presented by State Representative Dennis Zent.	
Dr. Charles N. Heape	December 4, 2015	Dentist. Presented by State Representative Dennis Zent.	
Dr. Philip L. Catey	December 4, 2015	Dentist. Presented by State Representative Dennis Zent.	
Dr. Clance LaTurner	December 4, 2015	Dentist. Presented by State Representative Dennis Zent.	
Jack Howey	March 29, 2016	Indiana newspaper editor and journalist. Member of the Indiana Journalism Hall of Fame.	
Donald Davidson	May 20, 2016	Indianapolis Motor Speedway historian	
William Van Deman	June 22, 2016	Banker and 20 year University of Indianapolis Board Member	
Dr. Robert Kopecky	June 22, 2016	MD and longtime University of Indianapolis Board Member	
Michael Scobey	June 24, 2016	Air Force veteran. Presented by State Representative Tim Harman.	
Jean Neel	July 27, 2016	Volunteer. Presented by State Representative Michael Karickhoff.	
Roger Johnson	September 2016	Former firefighter and Indiana state fire marshal. First award.	
Eugene Spafford	November 2016	Purdue University professor and cybersecurity expert. First award.	
Gina Moore	November 1, 2016	Vocalist. Presented by State Representative Wendy McNamara.	
Jerry L. Purcell	November 21, 2016	Fire Chief. Presented by State Senator Jeff Raatz and State Representative Brad Barrett.	
Bill Friend	December 22, 2016	Indiana State Representative	

=== Awarded under Eric Holcomb ===
Name	Date	Notes	Ref.
Adam Vinatieri	February 6, 2017	Former NFL kicker for the Indianapolis Colts	
Roger Johnson	July 5, 2017	Former firefighter and Indiana state fire marshal. Presented by Eric Holcomb in Columbus. Second award.	
Marilyn Morin	December 20, 2017	Founder and former Director of the Foster Grandparent Program, Marilyn received this award for providing the state of Indiana with more than 40 years of volunteer work with the elderly and children. The model Morin established for her volunteer programs and the Foster Grandparent Program are still used by the National Corporation for Community Service, and her Foster Grandparent Program still is thriving in the original south-central Indiana counties. The program is currently functioning in 33 schools.	
Jill Dunn	March 22, 2018	CEO of Bona Vista Programs Inc. Presented by State Representative Michael Karickhoff.	
David Lewis	April 2018	Former Library Dean at Indiana University–Purdue University Indianapolis.	
Maureen McFadden	February 12, 2019	Reporter and anchor for WNDU-TV in South Bend	
David Roth	March 18, 2019	Activisit. Presented by State Representative Mike Speedy.	
Kevin Winton	March 18, 2019	Activisit. Presented by State Representative Mike Speedy.	
John Ditslear	November 9, 2019	Mayor, City of Noblesville, Indiana (2004–2019).	
Bob Vollmer	February 2020	Indiana's oldest employee, who retired in 2020 at age 102	
Don Babcock	February 2021	Former director of NIPSCO's Economic Development team.	
Dave Bangert	February 4, 2021	Former journalist at the Journal & Courier.	
Mary Beth Schultz	March 12, 2021	Former director of The Caring Place domestic violence shelter. Presented by State Senator Ed Charbonneau.	
Randy Kolentus	April 2, 2021	Public safety leader with Richmond Police Department and Reid Health. Presented by State Senator Jeff Raatz and State Representative Brad Barrett.	
Lenore Schwartz	May 27, 2021	Known as Sister M. Lenore Schwartz, nun at St. Boniface Catholic Church in Lafayette. Awarded for "her years of dedication to the education and betterment of Indiana communities". Presented by State Senator Ron Alting.	
Melvin F. Wilhelm	July 24, 2021	Franklin County Prosecuting Attorney for 40 years, making him the longest-tenured elected prosecutor in U.S. history. Indiana Prosecuting Attorneys Association President 2004–06. In 2018, Wilhelm received IPAC's Eugene "Shine" Feller award, the association's highest honor.	
Steve Davisson	August 2021	Republican politician.	
Sarah Hallberg	August 2021	Medical director of Virta Health, for her work in diabetes research.	
Frank Schilling	September 25, 2021	President of the Schilling Home Improvement Center. Presented at St. John's Oktoberfest by State Senator Rick Niemeyer and State Representatives Hal Slager and Michael Aylesworth.	
Kenneth Brock	October 2021	Academic and author of ornithological books. Presented by Eric Holcomb at Indiana Dunes State Park.	
Robin Miller	October 2, 2021	Motorsports Journalist	
Martha Wheeler	October 14, 2021	Former president of the Lake Court House Foundation.	
Michael Brinegar	October 17, 2021	Swimmer at 2020 Summer Olympics. Presented by Eric Holcomb at Lucas Oil Stadium during Indianapolis Colts game against Houston Texans.	
Laurie Burns McRobbie	November 3, 2021	Indiana University's First Lady Emerita and co-founder of the Center of Excellence for Women & Technology.	
Thomas Jones	December 10, 2021	Interim Provost at Taylor University. Presented by Eric Holcomb.	
William P. Wilson	March 16, 2022	Teacher and Educator Leader for Local and State Education Systems.	
Shontrai D. Irving	June 28, 2022	Clinical Associate Professor of Business Law at Purdue University Northwest. Presented by State Representative Vernon Smith.	
James R. Williams	November 15, 2022	Partner at DeFur Voran LLP and President of the Muncie Community Schools Board of Directors. Presented by Ball State University President Geoffrey Mearns and Muncie Community Schools CEO Lee Ann Kwiatkowski.	
Daniel C. Banina	December 16, 2022	Devoted nearly 39 years of service to the people of Indiana. Served 12.8 years as a Chief Deputy Prosecutor and 26 years as Superior Court Judge in Miami County. Created State Pro Bono District. Chaired youth leadership programs for Boys Scouts and Peru Rotary Club. Presented by Ret. State Representative William Friend.	
Dennis Neary	December 21, 2018	Indiana State Senator. Presented by State Representative Michael Aylesworth.	
Robert A. Lee	January 26, 2023	Reverend and public servant. Presented by State Representative Michael Karickhoff.	
Mathew Palakal	April 26, 2023	Former Executive Associate Dean of the Luddy School of Informatics, Computing, and Engineering at IUPUI.	
Byron K. Callahan	September 15, 2023	World War II veteran and retired teacher. Presented by State Representative Kendell Culp.	
Holly M. Davis	October 10, 2023	Vice President of Indiana Philanthropy Alliance, founder of the John M. Mutz Philanthropic Leadership Institute, co-founder of Indiana Leadership Forum, and first executive director of the Richard G. Lugar Excellence in Public Service Series.	
Steve Collier	October 21, 2023	Mayor, City of Lawrence, Indiana (2016–2023)	
Greg Prange	November 4, 2023	Retired Seymour High School principal and Jackson County councilman.	
Paul Halverson	November 6, 2023	Founding dean of the Richard M. Fairbanks School of Public Health	
James Brainard	December 4, 2023	Mayor, City of Carmel, Indiana (1996–2024)	
Timm Schabbel	February 15, 2024	Clay Fire Territory fire chief. Presented by State Representative Timothy Wesco.	
Terry McFadden	February 29, 2024	Reporter and anchor for WNDU-TV and WSBT-TV in South Bend	
Dennis Blaney	March 20, 2024	Founder of the SHARE Foundation in La Porte, which assists mentally handicapped adults	
Craig Allebach	July 18, 2024	Town Manager, Winona Lake, Indiana	
Joseph P. Allen	October 15, 2024	Astronaut. Presented by State Representative Beau Baird and U.S. Representative Jim Baird.	
Dr. John Click	October 28, 2024	Dentist. Presented by State Representatives Stephen Bartels and Karen Engleman and State Senators Gary Byrne and Daryl Schmitt.	
Stephen Hofer	October 29, 2024	Founder and president of Aerlex Law Group. Presented at Indiana University by State Rep. Kyle Pierce.	
Thomas P. Miller	November 6, 2024	Workforce development expert and founder of Indiana-based consulting firm TPMA	
Rick Smith	November 8, 2024	Business owner and volunteer. Presented by State Representative Michael Karickhoff.	
Kelly Stanley	November 13, 2024	Community leader. Presented by State Representative Elizabeth Rowray.	
John S. Pistole	December 6, 2024	President of Anderson University	
Mung Chiang	December 31, 2024	President of Purdue University	
Josh S. Tatum	December 31, 2024	Attorney, constitutional scholar and Wabash College graduate (Class of 2003)	
Jud Fisher	December 31, 2024	President & CEO, Ball Brothers Foundation	
Bruce Schumacher	January 3, 2025	Chairman of the Board of the Indianapolis Indians	
Ed Soliday	January 8, 2025	Indiana State Representative	
Jeff Thompson	January 9, 2025	Indiana State Representative	
John Hall	January 11, 2025	World War II and Korean War veteran. Presented by State Representative Beau Baird and U.S. Representative Jim Baird.	
Pamela Whitten	January 13, 2025	President of Indiana University	
Doug Boles	January 13, 2025	President of the Indianapolis Motor Speedway	
Scott Stewart	January 13, 2025	Civil servant (state and local government), Proctor Gamble executive	
Roger Baylor	January 13, 2025	Brewery owner, craft beer advocate, writer	

=== Awarded under Mike Braun ===
Name	Date	Notes	Ref.
Vernon Smith	July 5, 2025	Indiana State Representative	
Michael and Nancy Uslan	August 11, 2025	Michael is a comics scholar and a film and television producer; he owns the film rights to Batman. Nancy has decades of philanthropy work. Presented by State Representative Martin Carbaugh	
Charlie Garner	October 23, 2025	World War II veteran	
2025 Indiana Hoosiers football team	March 4, 2026	2026 college football national champions	
Rupal Thanawala	July 21, 2026	CEO, Trident Systems LLC	
