= Bernard Clayton Jr. =

American writer

- Born: December 25, 1916; Rochester, Indiana
- Died: March 28, 2011 (aged 94); Bloomington, Indiana
- Occupations: Newspaper reporter, author, editor, photographer
- Known for: Cookbooks

Bernard Clayton Jr. (December 25, 1916 – March 28, 2011) was an American newspaper reporter, and foreign correspondent, author, and baker, who wrote cookbooks on bread, and pastries. Far less well known than his peer, James Beard, Clayton's books were equally regarded by those who baked, and by generations of home chefs who picked up the myriad revised editions of several of his books.

== Life ==
Bernard Clayton Jr.’s life began in the Midwest. He became a photographer, foreign correspondent, then went on to traveling, learning, creating, and writing about baking, then other foods.

== Birth ==
Clayton was born on Dec. 25, 1916, in Rochester, Indiana.

== Early years ==
The newspaper business ran in Clayton's family: his father, Bernard Clayton Sr., was the owner and editor of The Zionsville Times, a weekly newspaper.

== Family ==
His wife, Marjorie, traveled with him extensively. His son, Jeffrey, after two years at Indiana University became a reporter for the Indianapolis News. He had a daughter, Susan Barnato. At the time of his passing, he had three grandchildren, and six great-grandchildren.

== Career ==
As a young man, Clayton became a photographer for Life magazine, and then a photo editor. He was promoted to run the Time Life bureau in Chicago, then in San Francisco.

In World War II, he became a military correspondent for Time magazine, as well as for Life. After the war, he moved to Honolulu, where he ran a magazine-distribution company, Pacific News. He then had a brief career in public relations. He left corporate writing in 1964.

In 1965, Clayton took a bicycle trip across Europe with his wife that would change the direction of his life. He, and his wife, launched a journey by car, bicycle, a canal boat and even a horse-drawn Gypsy wagon, traveling throughout the United States, and Europe.

In 1966, Indiana University's news bureau hired him to run a special project. The job was to last for six months but turned into a fourteen-year-long stint as both writer, and editor. He retired from that job in 1980.

Clayton used his reporting skills to travel, and interview, anyone who baked, with a recipe that impressed him. He then returned to his test kitchen, and tirelessly reproduced all of the breads, muffins, pastries, soups, and stews that he had gathered from the field. The result were cookbooks that provided exhaustive, comprehensive collections of breads, pastries, and soups, that became seminal culinary publications. One, in particular, Bernard Clayton's Complete Book of Breads, was a landmark in baking, a compendium to the equally legendary “James Beard on Bread.”

== Writings ==
=== Bernard Clayton’s Complete Book of Breads ===
Published first in 1972, it was updated again in 1987, in 2003, and in 2006. The 1987 edition became one of the first books to also incorporate multiple recipe instructions for not only manual bread-making, but modern appliances like mixers with dough hooks, and food processors, both gaining space in American kitchens in that year. Clayton would test out all of the recipes that he had gathered, during his travels, in a professional kitchen. He shared his notes, mastering the techniques that he had observed in the field.

=== The Breads of France ===
In 1978, his book The Breads of France was published after he logged 7,000 miles across France, interviewing bakers, innkeepers, and home chefs.

=== The Complete Book of Pastry ===
In 1981, The Complete Book of Pastry did an exhaustive cataloging of global pastries, New York Times writer and chef Craig Claiborne, "one of the most important cookbooks of this year if not of this decade," and established Clayton as one of the seminal forces in writing about baking, noting that he was "perhaps the most industrious specialist in the area of baking."

=== Cooking Across America ===
In the early 1990s Clayton took an extensive trip across the United States, where he met with home cooks to discover their recipes. The book Cooking Across America was published in 1993.

=== Bernard Clayton’s Complete Book of Small Breads ===
In 1998 Clayton did a more exhaustive dive into the small breads, rolls, muffins, etc., that were a part of his bigger compendium on baking, Bernard Clayton’s The Complete Book of Breads.

=== The Complete Book of Soups and Stews ===
His lone deviation from baking, The Complete Book of Soups and Stews, was published in 1984 and then reissued as a revised edition in 2006, alongside Bernard Clayton’s The Complete Book of Breads.

=== Ancillary articles ===
Clayton contributed articles and recipes on food to newspapers, and other publications, including the Chicago Tribune.

== Death ==
Clayton died March 28, 2011, in Bloomington, Indiana, at the age of 94.

== Bibliography ==
- Bernard Clayton's The Complete Book of Breads, by Bernard Clayton Jr. (Simon & Schuster) Eds: 1972; 1987; 2003; 2006.
- Bernard Clayton's The Complete Book of Soups & Stews, by Bernard Clayton Jr. (Simon & Schuster)
- Bernard Clayton's Cooking Across America, by Bernard Clayton Jr.
- The Complete Book of Pastry, by Bernard Clayton Jr., (Simon & Schuster), 1981
- The Breads of France, by Bernard Clayton Jr.
- Bernard Clayton's The Complete Book of Small Breads, by Bernard Clayton Jr. (Simon & Schuster), 1998
