= List of Indiana state historical markers in Fulton County =

Location of Fulton County in Indiana

This is a list of the Indiana state historical markers in Fulton County.

This is intended to be a detailed table of the official state historical marker placed in Fulton County, Indiana, United States by the Indiana Historical Bureau. The location of the historical marker and its latitude and longitude coordinates are included below when available, along with its name, year of placement, and topics as recorded by the Historical Bureau. There is 1 historical marker located in Fulton County.

== Historical marker ==
Marker title	Image	Year placed	Location	Topics
Lake Manitou and Tiptonville.		1964	Ewing Road on the south side of the Lake Manitou dam in Rochester; 41°3′36″N 86°11′42″W	American Indian/Native American
Michigan Road		1949	Southeastern corner of the bridge that carries Old U.S. Route 31 over the Tippecanoe River, 3 miles north of Rochester; 41°6′20″N 86°13′13″W	Transportation, American Indian/Native American

== See also ==
- List of Indiana state historical markers
- National Register of Historic Places listings in Fulton County, Indiana
