= Senator Bowser =

Senator Bowser may refer to:

- Anita Bowser (1920–2007), Indiana State Senate
- Craig Bowser (fl. 2020s), Kansas State Senate
