= Tony Cook (politician) =

American politician

Member of the Indiana House of Representatives from the 32nd district
- In office December 15, 2014 – November 22, 2022
- Preceded by: P. Eric Turner
- Succeeded by: Victoria Wilburn

Personal details
- Party: Republican

Tony Cook is an American politician. He was a Republican member for the 32nd district of the Indiana House of Representatives.

In 2014, Cook won the election for the 32nd district of the Indiana House of Representatives. He succeeded P. Eric Turner. Cook assumed his office on December 15, 2014. He retired as a politician after his term for the 32nd district in 2022.
