= Bill Friend (politician) =

American politician

Speaker pro tempore of the Indiana House of Representatives
- In office November 5, 2014 – November 21, 2018
- Preceded by: P. Eric Turner
- Succeeded by: Michael Karickhoff

Member of the Indiana House of Representatives from the 23rd district
- In office November 4, 1992 – November 21, 2018
- Preceded by: Ray Musselman
- Succeeded by: Ethan Manning

Personal details
- Born: July 14, 1949 (age 77)
- Party: Republican
- Spouse: Ann Friend
- Education: University of Indianapolis (BS)

William C. Friend (born July 14, 1949) is an American politician who served as a member of the Indiana House of Representatives from 1992 to 2018. In January 2018, Friend announced that he would not be running for reelection.

== Education ==
Friend graduated from North Miami High School in 1967. He has a Bachelor of Science degree in biology from the University of Indianapolis.

== Career ==
He previously served as Allen Township Trustee/Assessor, a member of the Miami County Council, and Miami County Auditor.

Friend served in the Indiana House of Representatives since 1992. He was the House Majority Leader. His district included parts of Elkhart, Fulton, Kosciusko, Marshall and Miami Counties. He served on the Agriculture and Rural Development committees.

== Personal life ==
Friend lives in Macy, Indiana with his wife, Ann Friend. They have three children and two grandchildren.

Indiana House of Representatives
Preceded by P. Eric Turner	Speaker pro tempore of the Indiana House of Representatives; 2014–2018	Succeeded by Michael Karickhoff
