= Ron Herrell =

American politician

Member of the Indiana House of Representatives from the 30th district
- In office 2006–2010
- Preceded by: John Smith
- Succeeded by: Michael Karickhoff
- In office 1998–2004
- Preceded by: Karen Buyer Burkhardt
- Succeeded by: John Smith

Personal details
- Born: December 1, 1948 (age 77) Rochester, Indiana
- Party: Democratic
- Spouse: Jan
- Education: Indiana University Kokomo
- Profession: Kokomo Fire Department, retired

Ronald D. Herrell (born December 1, 1948) was a Democratic member of the Indiana House of Representatives, representing the 30th District from 2006 through 2010. He previously served from 1998 through 2004.
