= Michael Karickhoff =

American politician from Indiana

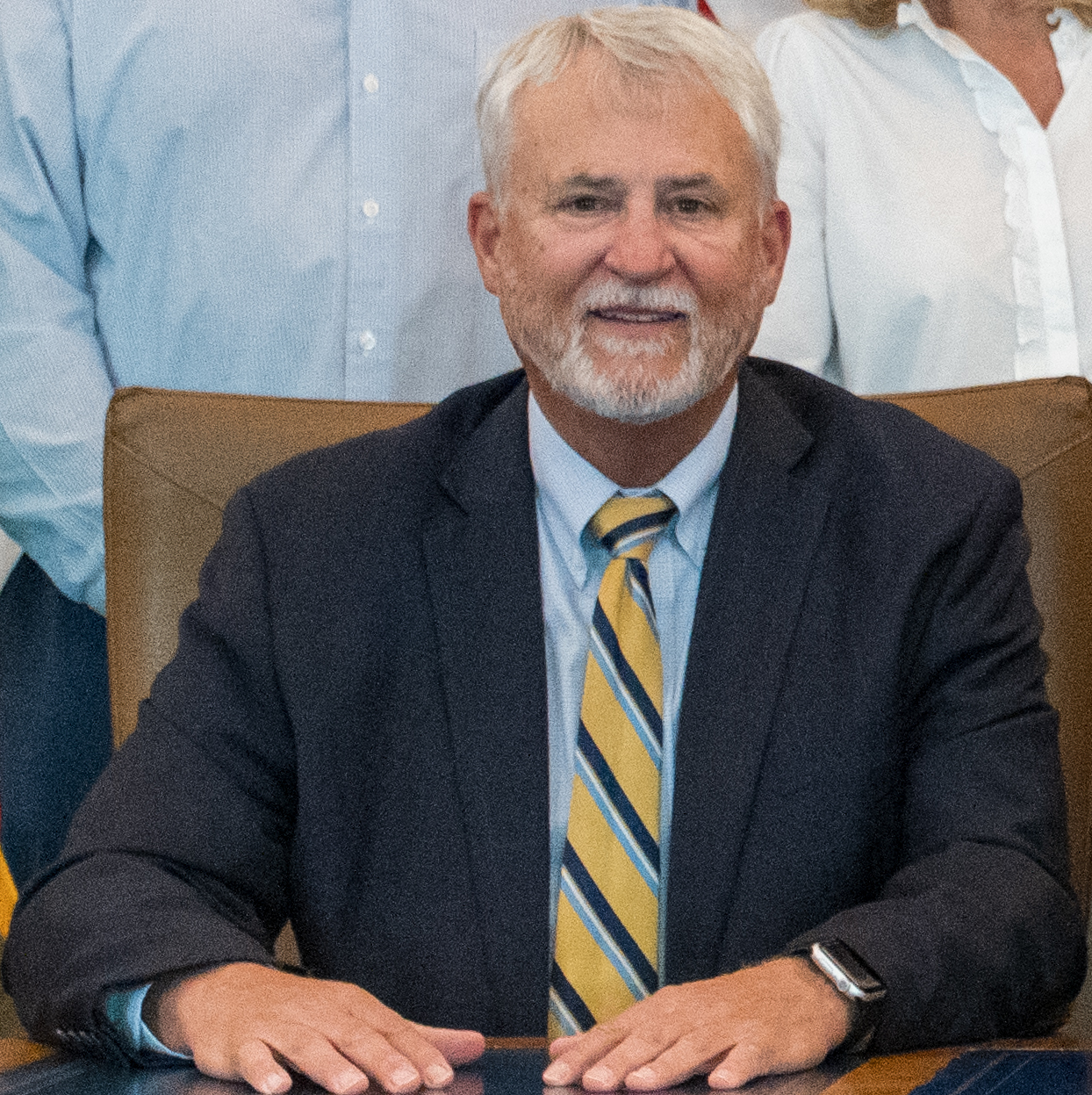

Speaker pro tempore of the Indiana House of Representatives
- Incumbent
- Assumed office January 3, 2019
- Preceded by: Bill Friend

Member of the Indiana House of Representatives from the 30th district
- Incumbent
- Assumed office November 2010
- Preceded by: Ron Herrell

Personal details
- Born: July 1, 1956 (age 70) Lafayette, Indiana, U.S.
- Party: Republican
- Spouse: Kelly
- Education: University of Missouri, Columbia (BS)

Michael Karickhoff (born July 1, 1956) is an American politician and member of the Indiana House of Representatives, representing the 30th District since 2010. Prior to his election to the state legislature, Karickhoff, a member of the Republican Party, was a Kokomo, Indiana Councilman. He was endorsed and recruited by Governor Mitch Daniels to run for Representative in the 2010 Indiana elections. He is not seeking reelection in 2026.

Indiana House of Representatives
| Preceded by P. Eric Turner | Speaker pro tempore of the Indiana House of Representatives; 2019–present | Incumbent |
