= Jim Arnold (Indiana politician) =

American politician (born 1950)

Member of the Indiana Senate from the 8th district
- In office March 25, 2007 – November 9, 2016
- Preceded by: Anita Bowser
- Succeeded by: Mike Bohacek

Personal details
- Born: December 2, 1950 (age 75) Michigan City, Indiana
- Party: Democratic
- Spouse: Lauren Arnold
- Education: Valparaiso University, Indiana University
- Profession: sheriff

Jim Arnold (born December 2, 1950) is a former Democratic member of the Indiana Senate, representing the 8th district between March 2007 and November 2016.

== Early life ==
Arnold grew up in Michigan City, Indiana, and graduated from Elston High School in 1962. He attended Western Michigan University for one semester before joining the U.S. Air Force. He later completed a bachelor's degree in political science at Valparaiso University.

== Career ==
Arnold worked in law enforcement for 32 years, four years in the La Porte County Prosecutor's Office, and eight as LaPort County Sheriff. In January 2007, Arnold retired as LaPorte County Sheriff. In March 2007, he began representing District 8 in the state legislature. In 2012, Arnold was named Legislator of the Year by the Disabled American Veterans.

In January 2016, Arnold announced that he would not seek re-election.

In November 2018, Arnold was nominated to Indiana's Motor Vehicles Sales Advisory Board and was sworn in on December 13, 2018.
