= Margret Holmes Bates =

American poet

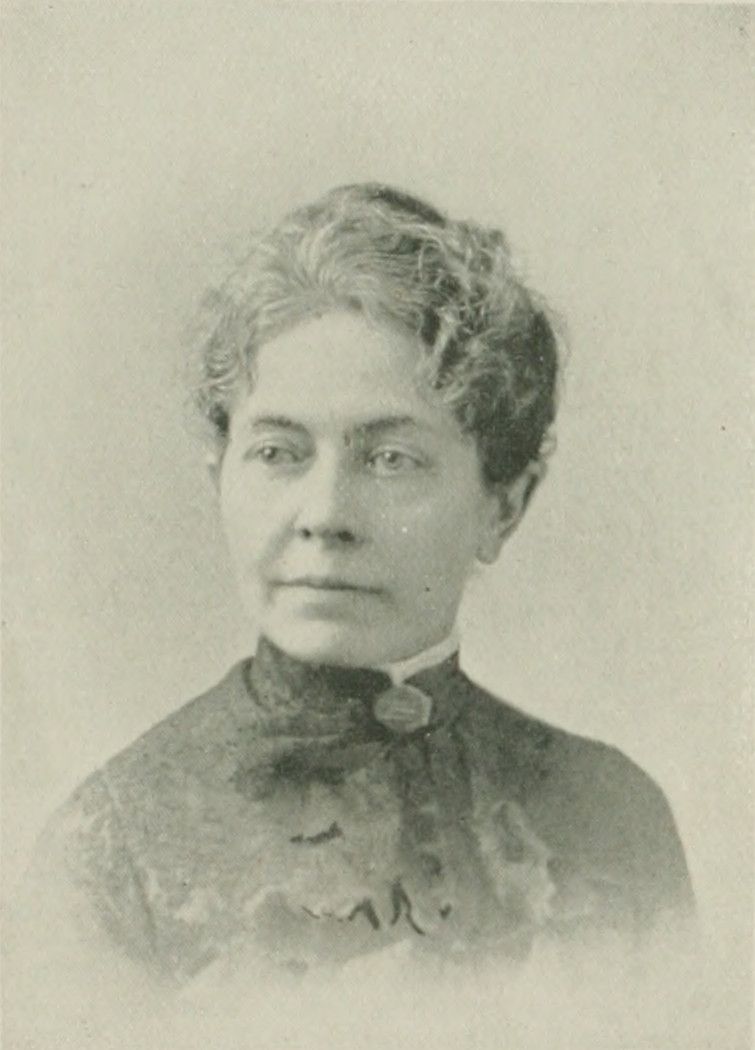
- Photo in A Woman of the Century
- Born: Martha Mary Victoria Ernsperger; October 6, 1844; Fremont, Ohio, U.S.
- Died: January 21, 1927 (aged 82); New York City New York, U.S.
- Occupation: Author
- Spouse: Charles Austin Bates (m. 1865)
- Children: Charles Bates
- Writing career
- Pen name: Mrs M E Holmes; Margret Holmes; Margret Holmes Bates; Margaret Holmes Bates
- Genres: novels; short stories; poetry; business articles; book reviews; school primers
- Notable work: Hildegarde

Margret Holmes Bates (née, Martha Mary Victoria Ernsperger; October 6, 1844 – January 21, 1927) was an American author better known by her pen names, Mrs M E Holmes, Margret Holmes, Margret Holmes Bates, and Margaret Holmes Bates. Her first publication was entitled, Manitou, the plot of which centered around Rochester, Indiana and Indianapolis, Indiana. One of her most noted books, Hildegarde, was a poetry collection, dedicated to her son, Charles.

== Early life and education ==
Martha Mary Victoria Ernsperger was born in Fremont, Ohio on October 6, 1844, a daughter of Christopher, a farmer, and Julia (Ensminger) Ernsperger, both of purely German descent. Her father was born in Baltimore but after he had attained his majority, he settled in northern Ohio. From Ohio, he removed to Rochester, Indiana in 1858. Her mother's family was from Pennsylvania.

During her childhood, she showed great fondness for books, and as a school-girl, the weekly or fortnightly "composition" was to her a pleasant past-time, a respite from the duller, more prosaic studies of mathematics and the rules of grammar. It was her delight to be allowed, when out of school, to put her fancies into form in writing, or to sit surrounded by her young sisters and baby brother and tell them stories as she thought of them. She spent her girlhood in Rochester, Indiana, and was educated in the public schools of Ohio.

== Career ==
Bates taught school in Rochester for many years. In June 1865, she married Charles Austin Bates, a businessman, of Medina, New York. After her marriage, her home was in Indianapolis. Fascinated for several years after her marriage with the idea of becoming a model housekeeper, and conscientious to a painful degree in the discharge of her duties as a mother, she wrote nothing for publication, and but little, even at the solicitations of friends, for special occasions. This way of life, unnatural for her, proved unhealthful. Some of her poems attracted wide attention. The poem, "Nineveh", was an epitome of her life. One of her most noted books, Hildegarde, was a poetry collection, dedicated to her son, Charles.

Her first novel, Manitou (1881), was written at the request of her son. It embodies a legend connected with the lake of that name in northern Indiana, in the vicinity of which Bates lived for several years before her marriage. The Chamber Over the Gate (Indianapolis, 1886) had a wide sale. Other books included, The price of the Ring (1892), Shylock's Daughter (1894), Jasper Fairfax (1897), In the First Degree (1907), Hildegarde and Other Lyrics (1911), and Browning Critiques (1927).

In addition to poetry and novels, she wrote short stories, business articles, book reviews, and school primers. When good health seemed to evade her, she turned to writing for pastime and wrote much for newspapers and periodicals. She was the editor-in-chief of Tatler, a monthly magazine established in Indianapolis in 1887.

Bates served on the executive committee of the Western Association of Writers, before removing to New York City in 1894. She was a charter member of the Browning Society of New York and an honorary member of the Indiana Society of New York. She was a member of Daughters of Ohio in New York, Daughters of Indiana in New York, and the Playgoers Club. In religion, she was Episcopalian. She supported women's suffrage.

== Death ==
After three days of illness, Margret Holmes Bates died of heart disease at her home in New York City on January 21, 1927, aged 82.

== Selected works ==
=== Books ===
==== As Margret Holmes ====
- Manitou (Indianapolis : Carlon & Hollenbeck, Printers and Binders, 1881)
- The Chamber over the Gate (Indianapolis : C.A. Bates, 1886)
- Her fatal sin (Chicago : Laird & Lee, 1886)
- A Heartless Woman; Or, Love and Deceit (Chicago : Laird & Lee, 1886)
- The Tragedy of Redmount (Chicago : Laird & Lee, 1886)
- Dialogues for Christmas (Indianapolis : Charles A. Bates, 1887)
- Recitations for Christmas (New York : The De Witt Publishing House, 1887)
- Little dialogues for little people (New York : De Witt publishing house, 1889)
- Select dialogues for young people (Chicago : Donohue, Henneberry, 1891)
- The price of the Ring (Chicago : F.J. Schulte & Co., 1892)
- Shylock's Daughter (Chicago : C.H. Kerr, 1894)
- Jasper Fairfax, (New York : R. F. Fenno, 1897)

==== As Margret Holmes Bates ====
- Silas Kirkendown's sons (Artwork by R. Stebbins; Boston : The C.M. Clark Publishing Co. 1908) (Note: The author name, Margret H. Bates, is imprinted on the Silas Kirkendown's Sons (1908) book cover, but the author name on the frontispiece is Margret Holmes Bates.)
- Paying the Piper (New York : Broadway Publishing Co., 1910)
- Hildegarde and Other Lyrics (New York : Broadway Publishing Co., 1911)
- Select readings and recitations for all the year round : Labor Day, Thanksgiving Day, Christmas and New Year, Washington's Birthday, Easter, Memorial Day (Lebanon, Ohio : March Bros., 1914)
- Browning critiques (Chicago : The Morris Book Shop, 1921)

==== As Margaret Holmes Bates ====
- In the First Degree (New York, R.G. Cooke, Inc., 1907)

=== Poetry ===
- "My Indian Basket"
- "Nineveh"

== Gallery ==
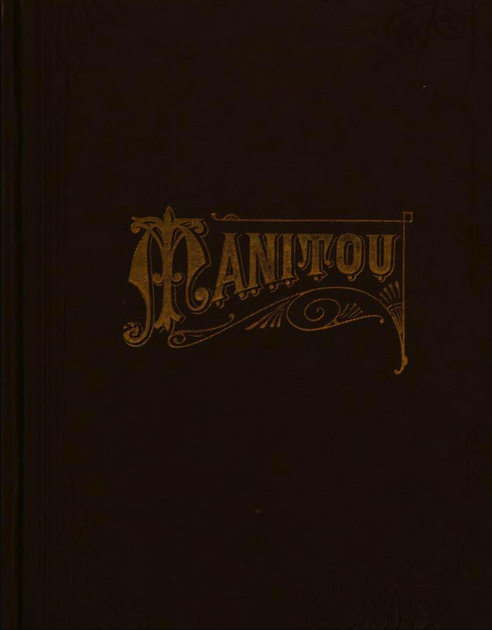
Manitou (1881)

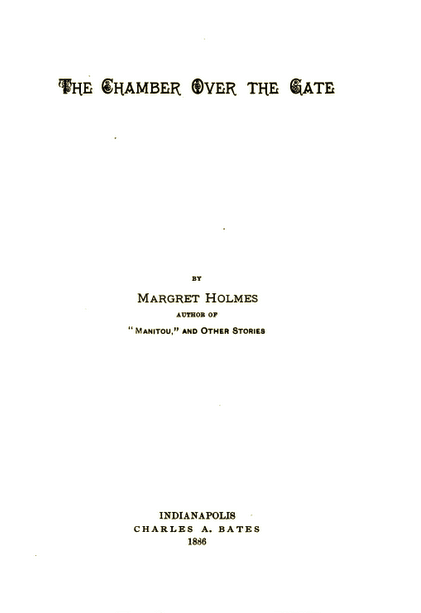
The Chamber over the Gate (1886)

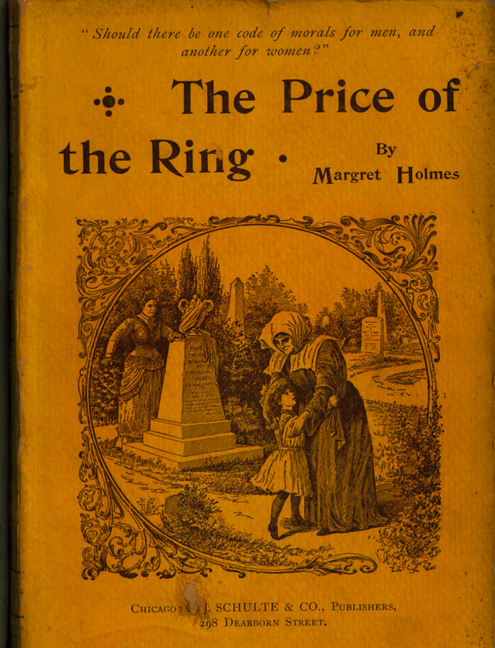
The Price of the Ring (1892)

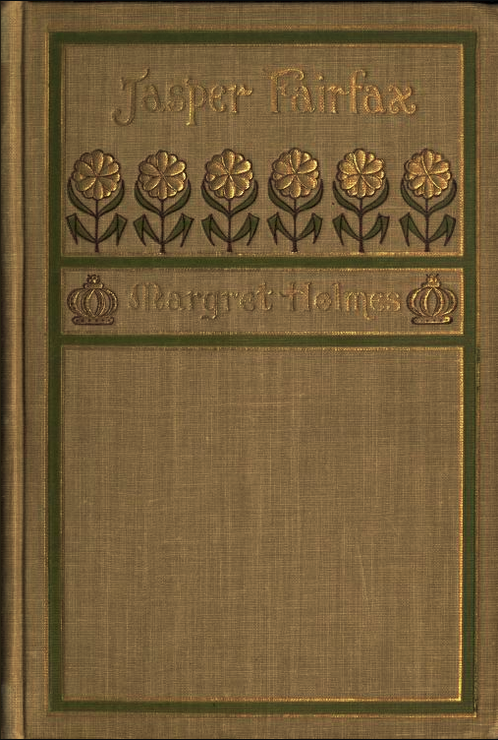
Jasper Fairfax (1897)

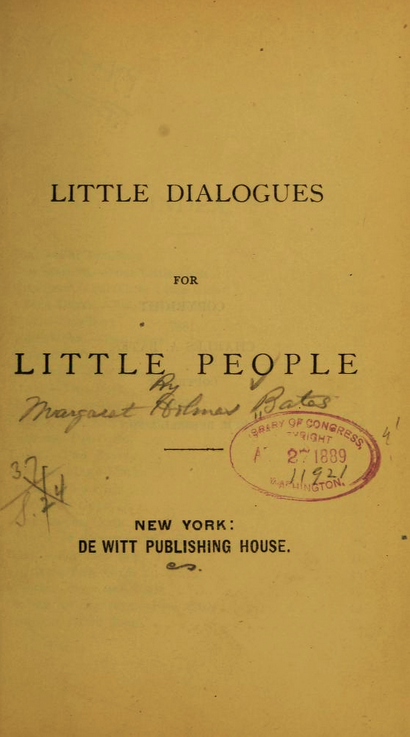
Little dialogues for little people (1889)

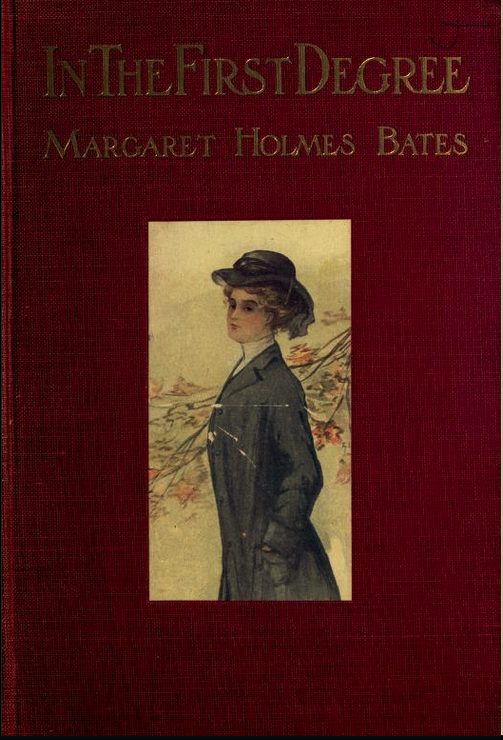
In The First Degree (1907)

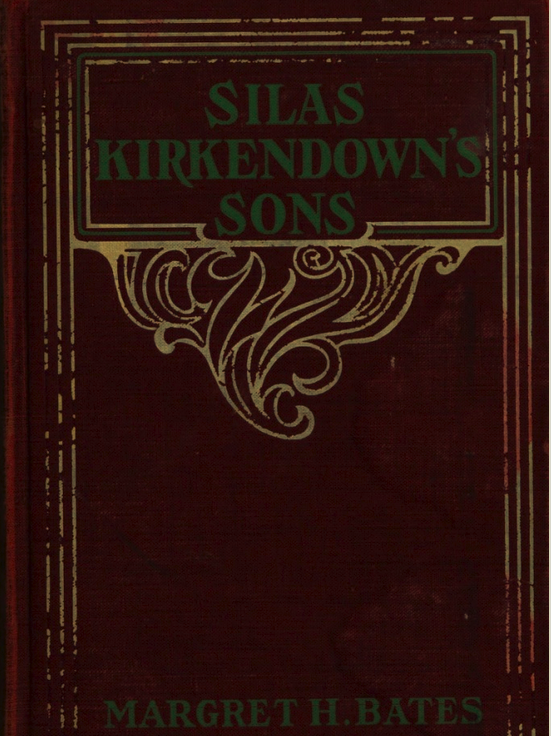
Silas Kirkendown's Sons (1908)

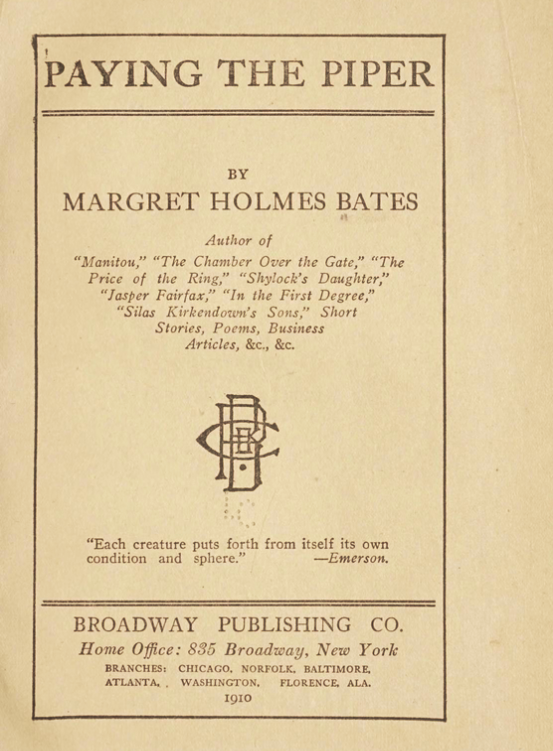
Paying the Piper (1910)

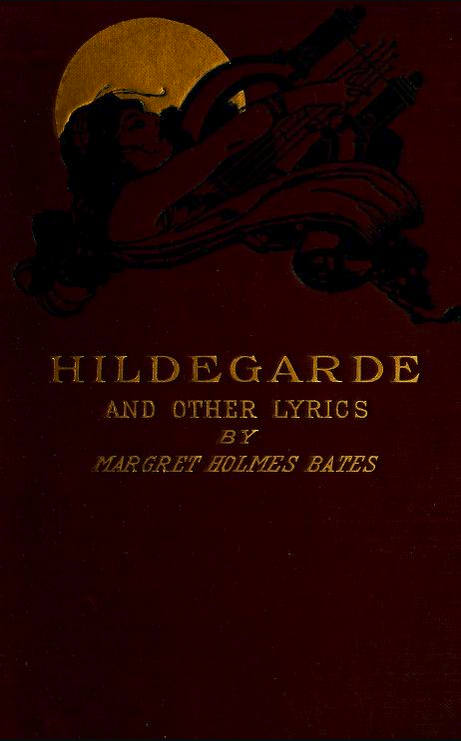
Hildegarde, and other lyrics (1911)

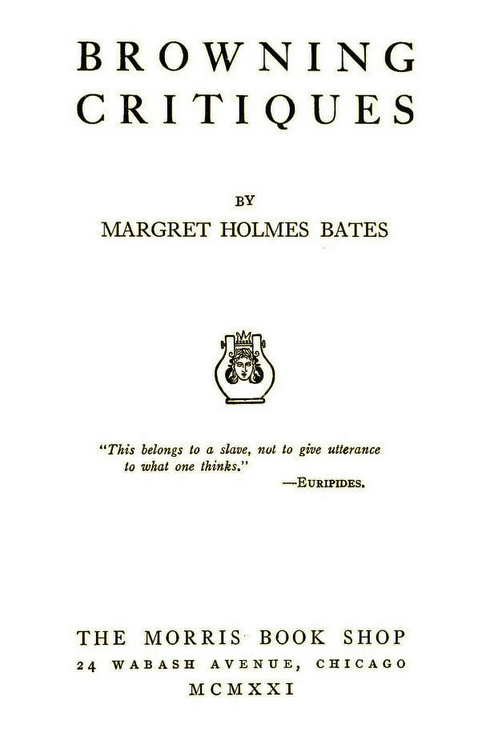
Browning Critiques (1921)
