= Jack Jordan (politician) =

American politician

Member of the Indiana House of Representatives from the 17th district
- Incumbent
- Assumed office November 9, 2016
- Preceded by: Tim Harman

Personal details
- Party: Republican
- Education: Liberty University (BS)

Jack Jordan is an American politician serving as a member of the Indiana House of Representatives for the 17th district. He assumed office on November 9, 2016.

== Education ==
Jordan graduated from Bremen High School in 1979. He studied industrial management at Purdue University for one year and earned a Bachelor of Science from Liberty University in 1984.

== Career ==
In 2016, Jordan was elected for the 17th district of the Indiana House of Representatives, succeeding Tim Harman. He assumed office on November 9, 2016.
