= Ann Vermilion =

American politician and businesswoman

Member of the Indiana House of Representatives from the 31st district
- In office August 14, 2019 – May 1, 2023
- Preceded by: Kevin Mahan
- Succeeded by: Lori Goss-Reaves

Personal details
- Party: Republican
- Spouse: Aaron
- Children: 3
- Education: Indiana University Bloomington (BS); Indiana University Kokomo (MBA)

Ann Vermilion is an American politician and businesswoman who served as a member of the Indiana House of Representatives from the 31st district. She was appointed to the House on August 14, 2019, succeeding Kevin Mahan.

== Education ==
Vermilion graduated from Marion High School. She earned a Bachelor of Science degree in kinesiology and business from Indiana University Bloomington and a Master of Business Administration from Indiana University Kokomo.

== Career ==
Vermilion worked as an administrator at the Marion General Hospital before founding a healthcare consulting business. Vermilion was appointed to the Indiana House of Representatives in August 2019, succeeding Kevin Mahan. She also serves as vice chair of the House Family, Children and Human Affairs Committee. In February 2021, Vermilion was selected as the next president of the Political Organization for Women's Education and Representation (POWER). On April 28, 2023, Vermilion announced she would be resigning from her position effective May 1, 2023.
