= Nancy Dembowski =

American politician (1934–2025)

Member of the Indiana House of Representatives from the 17th district
- In office 2007 - 2013
- Preceded by: Steve Heim
- Succeeded by: Tim Harman

Member of the Indiana Senate from the 5th district
- In office 2002 - 2004
- Preceded by: William E. Alexa
- Succeeded by: Victor R. Heinold

Mayor of Knox, Indiana
- In office 1991 - 2002

Personal details
- Born: Nancy Jo Clabaugh; August 14, 1934 Laporte, Indiana, U.S.
- Died: September 15, 2025 (aged 91) Knox, Indiana, U.S.
- Party: Democratic
- Spouse: Edward Dembowski (m. 1952; died 1995)
- Occupation: Radio

Nancy Jo Dembowski (née Clabaugh; August 14, 1934 – September 15, 2025) was an American Democratic politician who served as a member of the Indiana House of Representatives, representing the 17th District from 2007 to 2013. Her district included Starke County, most of Marshall County and three precincts in LaPorte County.

== Background ==
Born in La Porte, Indiana, Dembowski was a graduate of Knox Community High School. Both of her parents lived in Knox their entire lives, and her grandfather was a County Assessor and the longest-serving Fire Chief in Knox's history. She married her husband Ed (who worked as a union steelworker for 34 years), in Knox, where they raised their family. She had three children and eight grandchildren. She was widowed after 43 years of marriage when her husband Ed died in 1995. Dembowski died at her home in Knox on September 15, 2025, at the age of 91.

== Political career ==
Dembowski worked at WKVI Radio in Knox for 25 years. In 1984, she was elected to the Starke County Council and received the highest number of votes among all county candidates. She was re-elected to serve on the County Council in 1988, again leading the county ticket. The county had a balanced budget all seven years Nancy served on the County Council. In 1990, Nancy Dembowski received the Starke County Citizen of the Year Award. She served on the council until 1991.

In 1991 Nancy Dembowski was elected as the mayor of Knox, and re-elected to two additional terms, serving a total of 11 years. As Mayor, she led the effort to build the Knox Community Center and led the renovation of the Historic Gateway Depot. In addition, during her service as Mayor, the City of Knox received two prestigious Achievement Awards from the Indiana Association of Cities and Towns. Only four Indiana Cities receive these awards annually.

Dembowski was elected to the Indiana Senate in December 2002 by the Democratic precinct committee people to fill the unexpired term of state senator William E. Alexa, who resigned from the senate to fill a seat on the Porter County Superior Court. Dembowski ran unchallenged in the 2004 democratic primary, facing Republican Victor R. Heinold in the general election and losing by less than 500 votes.

She defeated two-term Republican incumbent Steve Heim in 2006. As a member of the Indiana House of Representatives, she served as vice-chair of the Courts and Criminal Code Committee, and was also a member of the Agriculture and Rural Development, Local Government and Roads and Transportation Committees.

She was also a member of the Starke County Economic Development Foundation, having served on that board since it first began and currently serves as its vice president. She served as Chairman of Starke United and President of the Starke County Junior Achievement board and the Chamber of Commerce. She was a past member of the Kiwanis Club and also served as a member of the Knox High School Improvement Plan Committee, the Harvest Festival Committee, and the Starke County Workforce One Advisory Board.

She became a member of the Starke County Community Foundation and was a former member of the Starke County Coalition Against Domestic Abuse where she helped institute a plan to build the Phoenix House, a safe haven for families escaping abuse. She also founded the Candy Cane Committee, a group of volunteers who built and designed Christmas decorations for the City of Knox.
