= Victoria Wilburn =

American therapist and politician

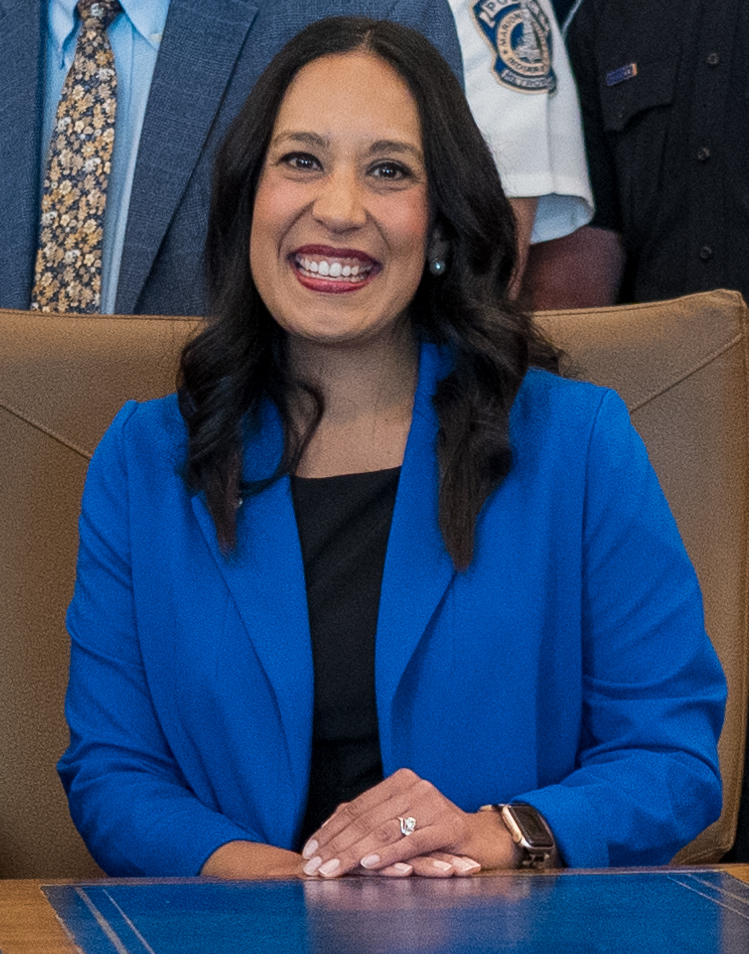

Member of the Indiana House of Representatives from the 32nd district
- Incumbent
- Assumed office November 9, 2022
- Preceded by: Tony Cook

Personal details
- Born: 1981 or 1982 (age 43–44)
- Party: Democratic
- Education: Boston University (BS); University of Indianapolis (MHS, DHS)

Victoria Garcia Wilburn (born 1981/1982) is an American occupational therapist and politician serving as member of the Indiana House of Representatives for the 32nd district. She assumed office on November 9, 2022.

== Education ==
Wilburn earned a Bachelor of Science degree in occupational therapy from Boston University, followed by a Master of Health Science and Doctor of Health Science from the University of Indianapolis.

== Career ==
Wilburn worked as an adjunct professor at the University of Indianapolis from 2012 and 2014 and as an assistant professor and academic fieldwork coordinator from 2014 to 2016. She was a visiting professor in the Department of Occupational Therapy at Indiana University–Purdue University Indianapolis in 2017 and became an assistant professor in 2018. Wilburn was elected to the Indiana House of Representatives in November 2022.

== Electoral history ==
Indiana State House District 32 election, 2022
| Party | Candidate | Votes | % | ±% |
|---|---|---|---|---|
| Democratic | Victoria Garcia Wilburn | 12,508 | 50.5% | New District |
| Republican | Fred Glynn | 12,260 | 49.5% | New District |
| Total votes | | 24,768 | 100.00% | |

Indiana State House District 32 election, 2024
| Party | Candidate | Votes | % | ±% |
|---|---|---|---|---|
| Democratic | Victoria Garcia Wilburn (incumbent) | 17,981 | 52.1% | +1.6% |
| Republican | Patricia Bratton | 16,539 | 47.9% | −1.6% |
| Total votes | | 34,520 | 100.00% | |
