= Lake Manitou (Indiana) =

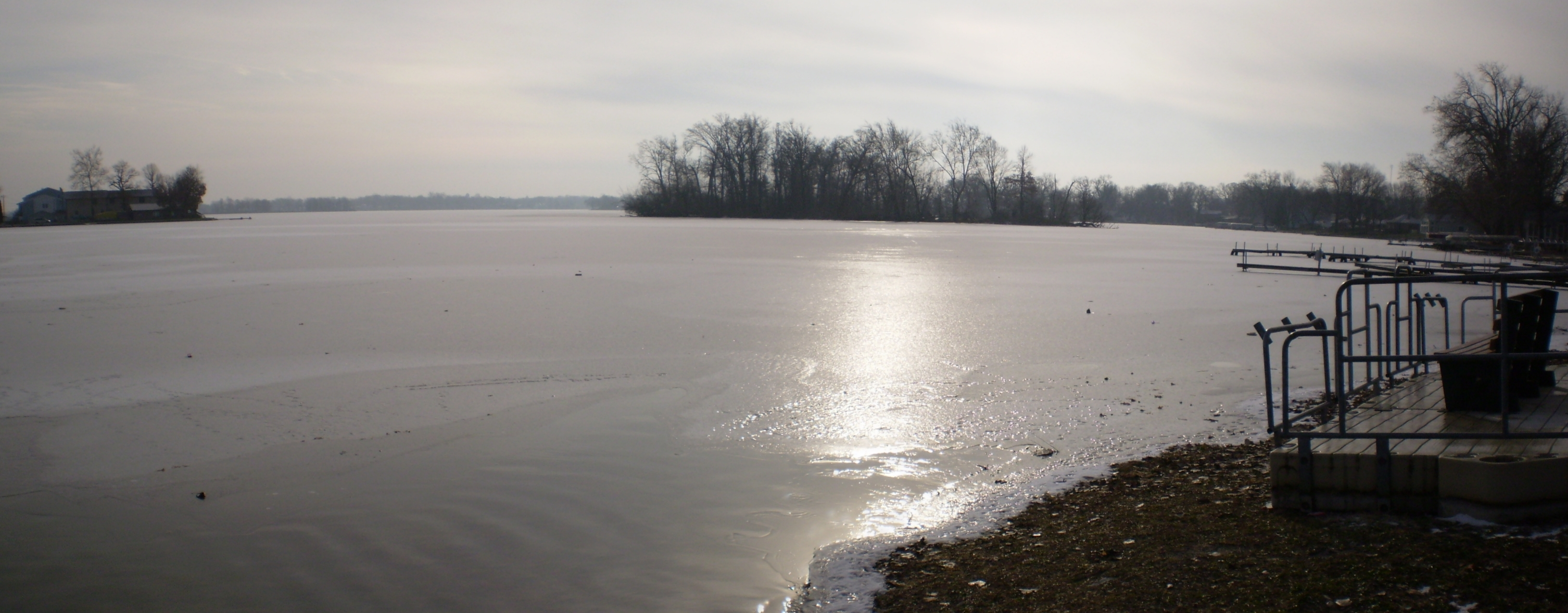

- Location within Indiana Location within the United States
- Location: Rochester, Indiana
- Coordinates: 41°3′35.78″N 86°11′31.94″W
- Type: artificial lake
- Basin countries: United States
- Surface area: 775 acres (314 ha)
- Average depth: 11 ft (3.4 m)
- Max. depth: 55 ft (17 m)
- Shore length^{1}: 8 mi (13 km)
- Surface elevation: 781 ft (238 m)
- ^{1} Shore length is not a well-defined measure.

Lake Manitou is a man-made lake in Rochester, Indiana, created in 1827 by the federal government of the United States for the Potowatomi Native American tribe. The lake was created as a part of the treaty with the Potowatomi that required the U.S. government to create a mill for Potowatomi use. The Potowatomi originally called the lake Man-I-Toe which translated to the Devil's Lake due to the belief that a monster lived in the lake. The lake contains about 775 acres (3.14 km^{2}) of open water, with a maximum depth of 65 feet (20 m).
