= Ethan Manning =

American politician

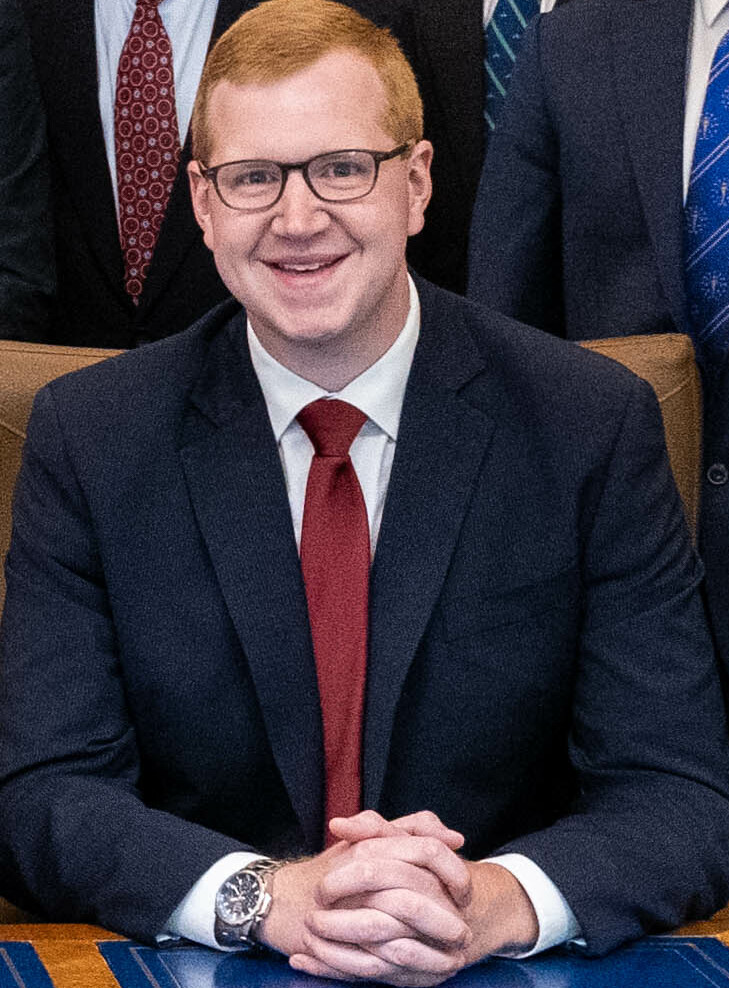

Member of the Indiana House of Representatives from the 23rd district
- Incumbent
- Assumed office November 7, 2018
- Preceded by: Bill Friend

Personal details
- Born: Peru, Indiana, U.S.
- Party: Republican
- Education: Western Governors University (BS)

Ethan Manning is an American politician and businessman serving as a member of the Indiana House of Representatives from the 23rd district. He assumed office on November 7, 2018.

== Early life and education ==
Manning was born in Peru, Indiana and was raised on a farm near Macy. After graduating from North Miami Middle/High School, he studied business management at Purdue University Fort Wayne for two years. He later earned a broker's license from the Real Estate Career Institute and completed his Bachelor of Science degree through Western Governors University.

== Career ==
Manning worked as a broker and auctioneer for Carriger Oldfather Realty and owned Manning Cattle. From 2011 to 2012, he served as the assistant Northeast Indiana political director in the district office of Richard Lugar. In 2012 and 2013, he was the chair of the Indiana Federation of College Republicans. From 2014 to 2018, he served as a member of the Miami County, Indiana Council and later as chair of the Miami County Republican Party. He was elected to the Indiana House of Representatives in 2018.
