= Steve Heim =

American politician

Member of the Indiana House of Representatives from the 17th district
- In office November 6, 2002 – November 8, 2006
- Preceded by: Gary L. Cook
- Succeeded by: Nancy Dembowski

Personal details
- Party: Republican
- Spouse: Karen
- Children: 2
- Education: Vincennes University; Taylor University

Steve Heim was a Republican member of the Indiana House of Representatives representing the 17th district where he served since 2003. Heim served as the Vice Chairman of the House Committee on Environmental Affairs, and also serves on the Education Committee; Commerce, Economic Development & Small Business Committee; and the Family, Children & Human Affairs Committee. On November 7, 2006, Heim lost his reelection bid to former Democratic State Senator Nancy Dembowski.
