= Tim Harman =

American politician

Member of the Indiana House of Representatives from the 17th district
- In office November 7, 2012 – November 9, 2016
- Preceded by: Nancy Dembowski
- Succeeded by: Jack Jordan

Timothy Patrick Harman is a former member of the Indiana House of Representatives representing District 17 from 2012 to 2016. Harman is a Republican. He is the founder and President of Harman Restaurants, Inc.

== Education ==
- High School – Plymouth High School, 1985 graduate
- Bachelor's Degree in Geography – Florida Atlantic University, 1992
- Master's Degree in Education – Florida State University, 1994

== Sources ==
- http://ballotpedia.org/Timothy_Harman
- http://votesmart.org/candidate/34010/timothy-harman#.VBS_8SwtCUk
