= Anita Bowser =

American politician (1920–2007)

Member of the Indiana Senate from the 8th district
- In office May 6, 1992 – March 4, 2007
- Preceded by: Dennis Neary
- Succeeded by: Jim Arnold

Member of the Indiana House of Representatives from the 9th district
- In office November 3, 1982 – November 4, 1992
- Preceded by: Mary Kay Budak
- Succeeded by: Thomas J. Alevizos

Member of the Indiana House of Representatives from the 7th district
- In office December 28, 1979 – November 5, 1980
- Preceded by: Clifford Arnold
- Succeeded by: Mary Kay Budak

Personal details
- Born: August 18, 1920 Canton, Ohio
- Died: March 4, 2007 (aged 86) Indianapolis, Indiana
- Party: Democratic
- Education: Kent State University; Purdue University; University of Notre Dame

Anita Olga Bowser (née Albu; August 18, 1920 – March 4, 2007) was an American politician who served as a member of the Indiana Senate from 1992 until her death in 2007. A Democrat, she was a member of the Indiana House of Representatives for the 7th district from 1979 to 1980 and for the 9th district from 1982 to 1992. She was a state delegate to the Democratic National Convention from 1956 to 1984.

== Early life ==
Bowser was born Anita Olga Albu on August 18, 1920, in Canton, Ohio. Her parents were Nicholas B. Albu and Karoline Albu (née Stobbe). She had a sister, Kay, and a brother Carl. She received a Bachelor of Arts degree from Kent State University in 1945, a bachelor of laws degree from the William McKinley School of Law in 1949, a Master of Arts degree from Purdue University in 1967, and a Master of Arts degree in 1972 and a doctorate of philosophy degree in 1976 from the University of Notre Dame. She married Russell Bowser, a professor, in 1948. The following year, the couple moved to Michigan City, Indiana. Bowser worked as a part-time professor in political science at the Purdue Barker Center, which became the North Central campus of Purdue University, where she taught until retiring in 1991. She helped to found the university and was the first female professor.

Bowser received the Standard Oil Award for Outstanding College Teaching in 1969, the Indiana State Bar Association Award in 1976 and Outstanding Woman from the Business and Professional Women's Association. She was a member of the Business and Professional Women's Association, the American Association of University Women, the League of Women Voters and the Women's Democratic Caucus.

== Political career ==
Bowser was a member of the Democratic Party and from 1956 to 1980, she was an Indiana state delegate at the Democratic National Convention. She was a delegate to the 1984 Democratic National Convention and a member of the Democratic National Platform Committee. She testified before the Judiciary Committee of the state legislature during its hearings on the Equal Rights Amendment.

=== Indiana House of Representatives ===
Bowser was first appointed to the Indiana House of Representatives to represent the 7th district on December 28, 1979, succeeding Clifford Arnold who had resigned to become the mayor of Michigan City. During her freshman legislative session, she sponsored legislation with Michael K. Phillips to empower the state Public Service Commission to prevent utility companies from cutting off people's power over winter. Bowser supported abortion rights, collective bargaining, legislation to combat AIDS and the reduction of prison sentences for non-violent offenders. She served as the representative for the 7th district until November 5, 1980, when she lost re-election.

Bowser was elected in the 1982 general election for the 9th district, acting as representative from November 3, 1982, to November 4, 1992. She was the first woman in Indiana to serve as deputy speaker pro tempore of the state's lower chamber, having been elected in 1990, and the first female speaker of the house. She was the vice-chair of the courts committee in the 1991 legislative session. In 1991, she authored a bill to require health insurance to cover mammograms for women over a certain age, which passed the lower chamber of the legislature in February. The same year, she was appointed vice chair of the House's standing committee on public policy, ethics and veterans affairs.

=== Indiana Senate ===
Bowser was sworn into the Indiana Senate on May 6, 1992, to represent the 8th district after the resignation of Dennis Neary. She challenged Republican Michael Zucker in the election on the same year to retain her seat and on November 4, 1992, she won. Bowser received 26,881 votes to Zucker's 16,449 votes. She remained in this position until her death. In 2002, she sponsored a bill to raise the age for the death penalty from 16 to 18, which passed the senate's judiciary committee on a 7–2 vote. Bowser focused on education, economic development, health care, and the environment, and she was described as "the conscience of the Indiana State Senate". She also worked on issues such as "prescription drug assistance, the protection of Indiana’s telephone privacy list, support for agricultural development, assistance for victims of sexual assault, and tax amnesty for small businesses".

In 2006, Bowser sponsored SB 66, which would have created an exception from the death penalty for defendants suffering from severe mental illness but it was never voted on in the senate. She spoke in front of the state Senate a month from her death, arguing in opposition to a constitutional ban on same-sex marriage. At the time of her death, she was the ranking Democrat of the pensions and labor committee and a member of the judiciary committee, the corrections, criminal and civil matters committee, the ethics committee, and the education and career development committee. Following her death, her position in the senate was filled by Jim Arnold.

== Death and legacy ==
Bowser died on March 4, 2007, in Indianapolis at the age of 86. She died of breast cancer. The Bowser Commission was named in her honor, as she had been interested in examining the death penalty and its suitability for defendants suffering from mental disorders. She was honored in the public record of both the Indiana House of Representatives and the United States Senate. During her career, Bowser received the Louis Ingelhart Award for Freedom of Expression, the Amnesty International Abolitionist of the Year Award, and the Robert Dale Owen Legislator Award from the Indiana Civil Liberties Union.
