= Dennis Neary =

American politician

Member of the Indiana Senate from the 8th district
- In office November 16, 1976 – November 17, 1992
- Preceded by: John F. Shawley
- Succeeded by: Anita Bowser

Personal details
- Born: February 11, 1944 La Porte, Indiana, U.S.
- Died: October 14, 2024 (aged 80) Carmel, Indiana, U.S.
- Party: Democratic

Dennis Neary (February 11, 1944 – October 14, 2024) was an American politician who served in the Indiana Senate from the 8th district from 1976 to 1992.

He died on October 14, 2024, in Carmel, Indiana at age 80.
