= Lyman M. Brackett House =

Historic house in Indiana, United States

- U.S. National Register of Historic Places
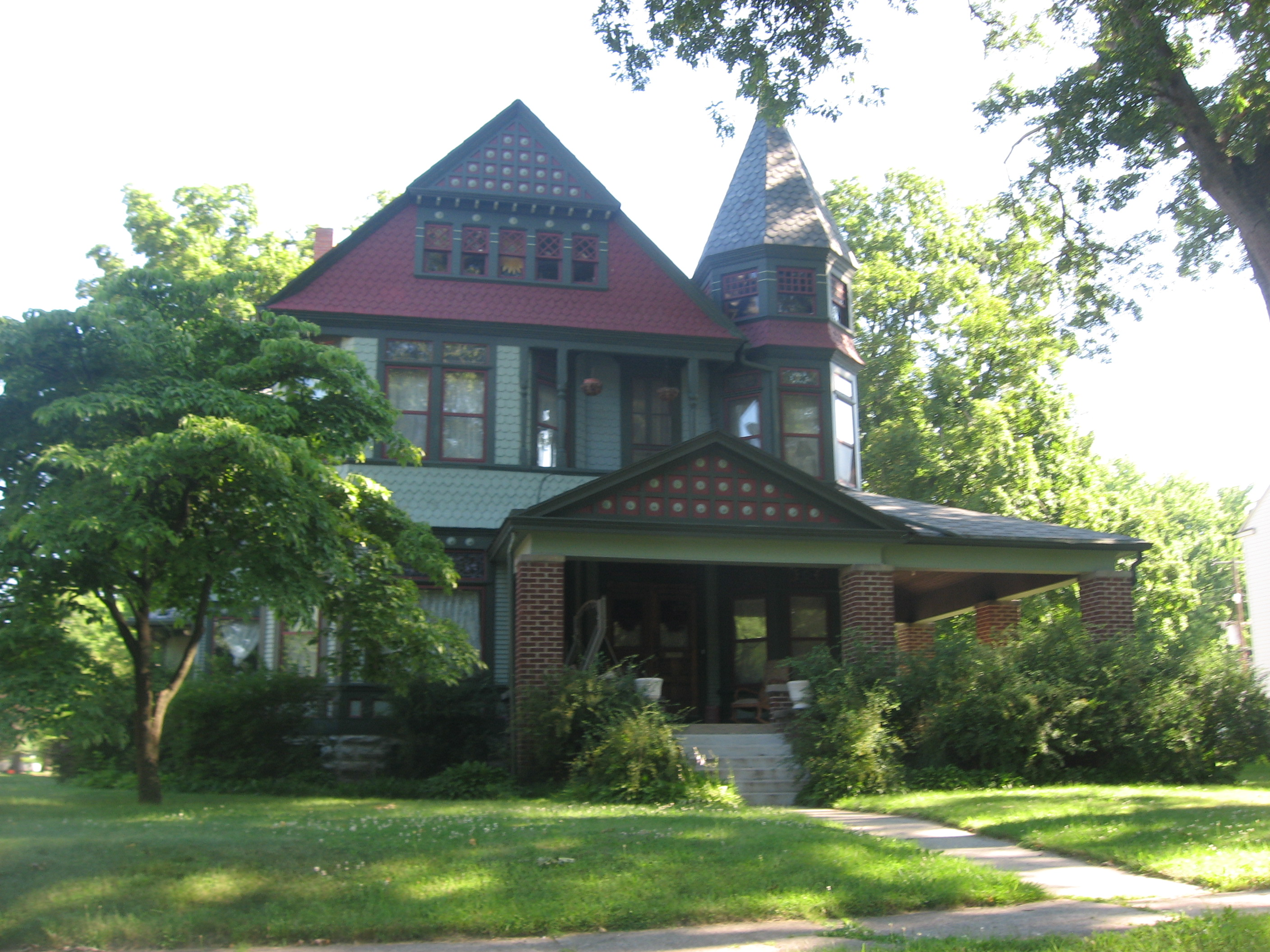
- Lyman M. Brackett House, July 2013

- Location within Indiana Location within the United States
- Location: 328 W. 9th St., Rochester, Indiana
- Coordinates: 41°3′55″N 86°13′8″W
- Area: less than one acre
- Built: 1884-1886
- Architect: Joseph E. Mills
- Architectural style: Queen Anne
- NRHP reference No.: 84001036
- Added to NRHP: September 27, 1984

Lyman M. Brackett House is a historic home located at Rochester, Indiana. It was built in 1884–1886, and is a 2 1/2-story, irregular plan, Queen Anne style frame dwelling topped by a slate gable roof. It features multiple gables, an octagonal tower, and wraparound brick porch. Also on the property is a contributing carriage house.

It was listed on the National Register of Historic Places in 1984.
