= Fulton County Courthouse (Indiana) =

- U.S. National Register of Historic Places
- U.S. Historic district – Contributing property
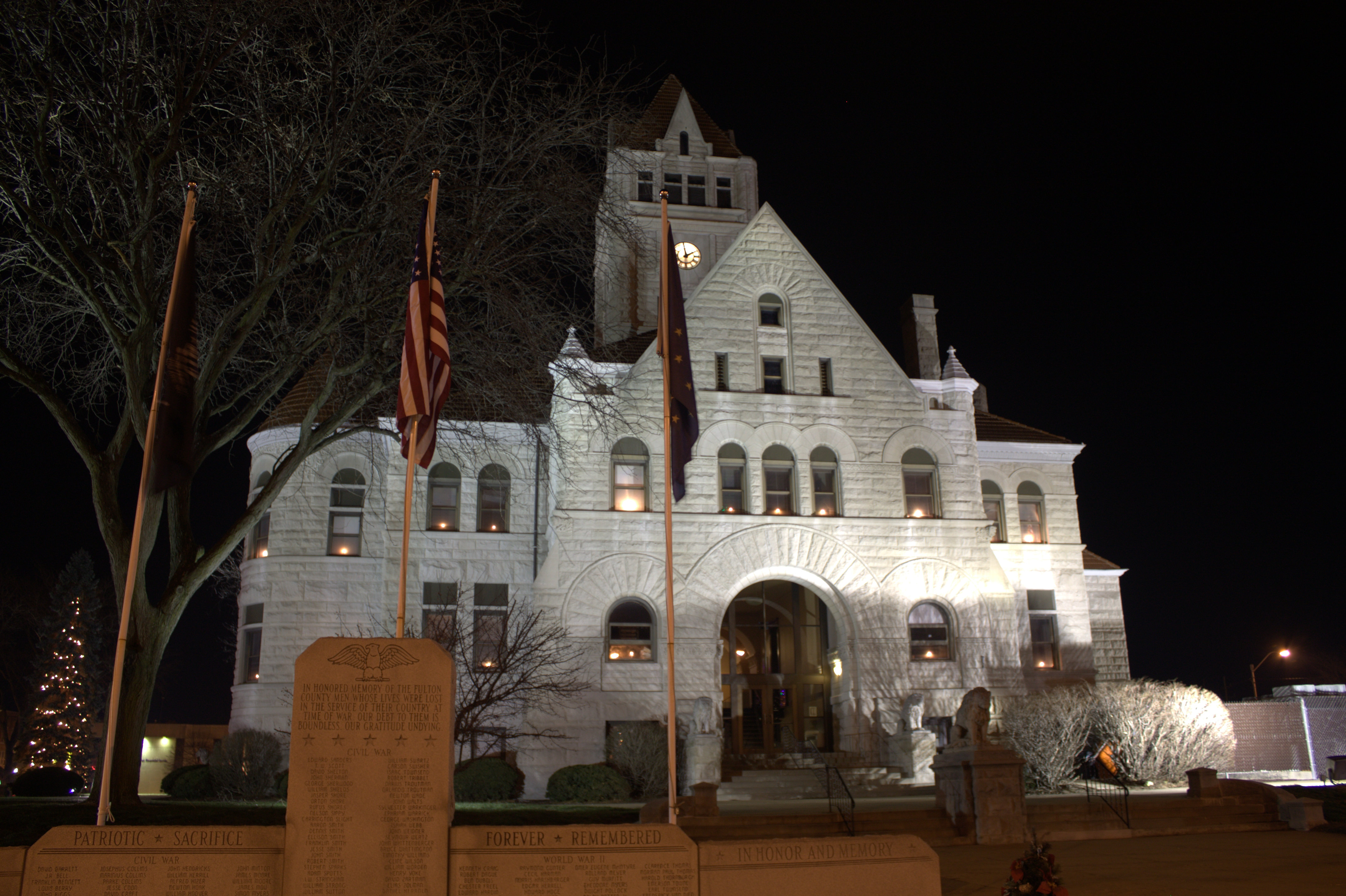
- Fulton County Courthouse

- Location within Indiana Location within the United States
- Location: 815 Main St., Rochester, Indiana
- Coordinates: 41°3′56″N 86°12′55″W
- Built: 1895
- Built by: Gibson, J.P.
- Architect: Rush A.W. & Son
- Architectural style: Romanesque
- NRHP reference No.: 00001138
- Added to NRHP: September 22, 2000

The Fulton County Courthouse is a historic courthouse located at Rochester, Indiana. It was built in 1895–1896, and is a four-story, Richardsonian Romanesque style limestone building. It has a cross-hall plan and features a central bell and clock tower with a pyramidal roof. In addition to the courthouse, the grounds have four memorials: one for the Pottawatomies' Trail of Death, a cornerstone for the Rochester College, and two war memorials.

The current courthouse is the third Fulton County courthouse, preceded by an 1837 log cabin and an 1846 structure.

It was listed on the National Register of Historic Places in 2000. It is a prominent building in the Rochester Downtown Historic District.
