= Kevin Mahan =

American politician from Indiana

Member of the Indiana House of Representatives from the 31st district
- In office November 16, 2010 – July 31, 2019
- Preceded by: Joe Pearson
- Succeeded by: Ann Vermilion

Personal details
- Born: August 3, 1969 (age 56) Blackford County, Indiana, U.S.
- Party: Republican

Kevin Mahan (born August 3, 1969) is an American politician who served in the Indiana House of Representatives for the 31st district from 2010 to 2019.
