= John W. Smith House =

Historic house in Indiana, United States

- U.S. National Register of Historic Places
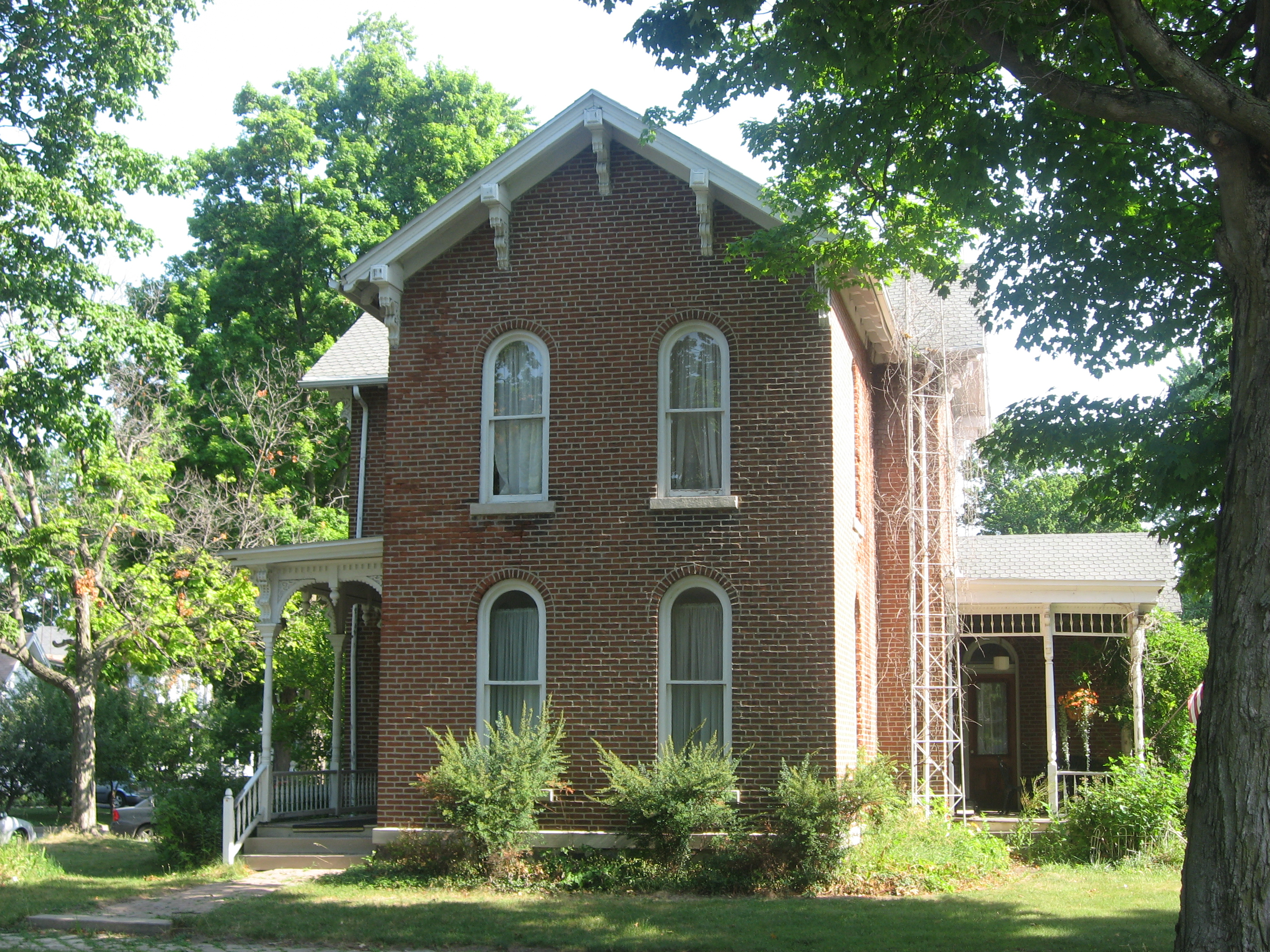

- Location within Indiana Location within the United States
- Location: 730 Pontiac St., Rochester, Indiana
- Coordinates: 41°3′58″N 86°13′10″W
- Area: less than one acre
- Built: 1892
- Architectural style: Neo-Jacobean
- NRHP reference No.: 79000015
- Added to NRHP: July 26, 1979

John W. Smith House, also known as the Roberta Nicholson House, is a historic home located at Rochester, Indiana. It was built in 1892, and is a 2 1/2-story, Neo-Jacobean style frame dwelling on a limestone block foundation. It features a projecting round tower, wraparound porch, and 75 windows of various sizes.

It was listed on the National Register of Historic Places in 1979.
