= Germany Bridge =

- Formerly listed on the U.S. National Register of Historic Places
- Location within Indiana Location within the United States
- Nearest city: Rochester, Indiana
- Area: less than one acre
- Built: 1879
- Built by: Wrought Iron Bridge Co.
- NRHP reference No.: 80000426

Significant dates
- Added to NRHP: December 22, 1978
- Removed from NRHP: March 28, 1980

Germany Bridge was a historic Whipple Truss bridge located near Rochester, Indiana. It was built in 1879 by the Wrought Iron Bridge Co., and spanned the Tippecanoe River. It was a single span iron bridge on cut stone abutments. It collapsed on October 23, 1979, and was replaced with new span in 1980

It was listed on the National Register of Historic Places in 1978 and delisted in 1980.
