= Rochester Downtown Historic District =

Historic district in Indiana, United States

- U.S. National Register of Historic Places
- U.S. Historic district
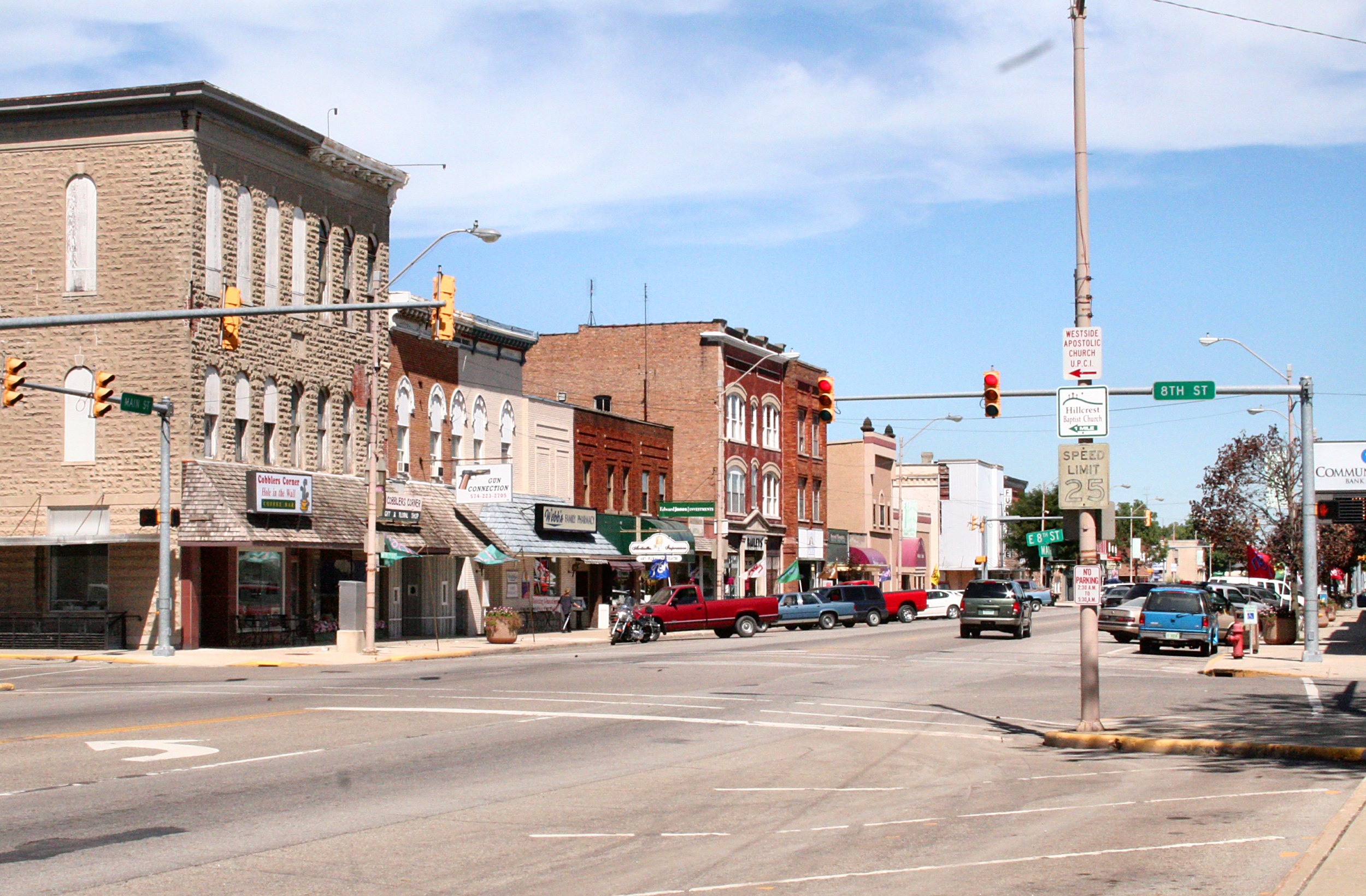
- Intersection in the district

- Location within Indiana Location within the United States
- Location: Roughly bounded along Main St. and the Courthouse Square, Rochester, Indiana
- Coordinates: 41.06721°N 86.21627°W
- Architect: Rush, A.W. & Son; et al.
- Architectural style: Late Victorian, Colonial Revival, Romanesque
- NRHP reference No.: 08000556
- Added to NRHP: June 24, 2008

The Rochester Downtown Historic District is a historic district on the National Register of Historic Places (NRHP) in Rochester, Indiana, United States. It was placed on the Register on June 24, 2008. The majority of buildings in the area are masonry and Italianate while structures outside the district are largely residential frame built structures.

Rochester was founded as a trading post in 1831 between the European settlers and local Native Americans, along the old Michigan Road where it intersected Mill Creek. Most of the contributing buildings lie along the old Michigan Road, now Main Street, in a right-of-way pattern (the newer, non-contributing buildings do not follow this pattern).

Alexander Chamberlain built the first tavern-hotel in Rochester in 1835, the same year, he and Lot Bozarth filed a plat for the town of Rochester. In 1836, Cyrus Taber with William and George Ewing expanded the original plat south one block to include what is now the courthouse square. The first courthouse was built of wood in 1837 along with a jail. Rochester's location on the Michigan Road contributed to continued growth. By 1840, there were several three story buildings and 300 residents.

The current courthouse was built in 1895-1896 and the old jail replaced in 1851. The Indianapolis, Peru and Chicago Railroad arrived in 1869, and brick became the norm for commercial construction.

Prominent buildings in the district include the Fulton County Courthouse (which is a Richardsonian Romanesque building also NRHP-listed), a water tower, Rochester City Hall & Fire Department, post office, and telephone company.

The limestone courthouse, which was already on the National Register as of September 22, 2000, is located on Ninth Street. Four different memorials are on its grounds: one for the Pottawatomies' Trail of Death, a cornerstone for the Rochester College, and two war memorials. Although most of the buildings in the district are constructed of brick, after the construction of the courthouse, with its rusticated limestone construction, it is believed that other buildings were renovated to match the courthouse using faux stone that was cemented to their brick structures; the Masonic Temple is reflective of this. Limestone is also used on the name blocks of buildings. The historic fire department has an engraved limestone name block above its door. The city hall not only has a similar limestone name block, but the right and left bays of the hall have limestone diamonds above them.

== Significant buildings ==
All structures are historically contributing towards the Historic District Status, unless otherwise noted. An ‘O’ rating signifies that the structure had enough historic or architectural significance to be considered for individual listing in the National Register of Historic Places. The ‘N’ rating signifies that the structure is above average and may, with further investigation be eligible for an individual listing. The ‘C’ or contributing rating signifies that the structure meet the basic inventory qualifications, but fails to meet individual merit, but in combination with other closely placed similar structures warrants inclusion in an historic district.
East Eight St

- 118-22 – Centennial Block, Italianate, 1876 (N) Built during the nations centennial year, the Centennial Building was built for Feder and Silberberg clothing. Additionally, the Red Man Lodge met here and the Rochester Sentinel operated from this building from its founding until 1924. The Sentinel is the oldest business operating in the county.

Main St

- 714-12 – Dillon Building, Neo-Classical, c. 1915, (N)
- 730-28 – Mammoth Building, Italianate, 1869, (N) The Mammoth Building was built in 1869 by William Ritters and used by the Mason.
- 800 – J.Dawson Building, Italianate, 1872 (C)
- 800 block – Fulton County Courthouse, Richardsonian Romanesque, 1896; Architect: A.W. Rush & Son; Building: J.E. Gibson (N)
- 802 – Rochester Bank Building, Italianate, 1887 (C)
- 830-28 – I.O.O.F. Block; Indeterminate, 1870 (NC)
- 831 – Historical Marker, Commemorates Founding of Rochester College, 1895, (N) "In 1893 a public spirited group of businessmen and educators decided that Rochester, Indiana was a strategic location for a Normal College. Those who spearheaded the promotion were Dr. W.S. Shafer, Prof. George Suman and Prof. W.H. Banta. The Institution site was at the south end of College Avenue. The Corner stone was laid June 27 and the building dedicated November 29, 1895. It was constructed of brick and stone, of Norman design. It consisted of a full basement and three floors, which accommodated 400 students. Prof. Banta was the first President. In 1908 Prof. F.A. Herrington succeeded him. Miss Flo Delp was long time secretary. The College closed its doors in 1912 because of financial problems."

== Gallery ==
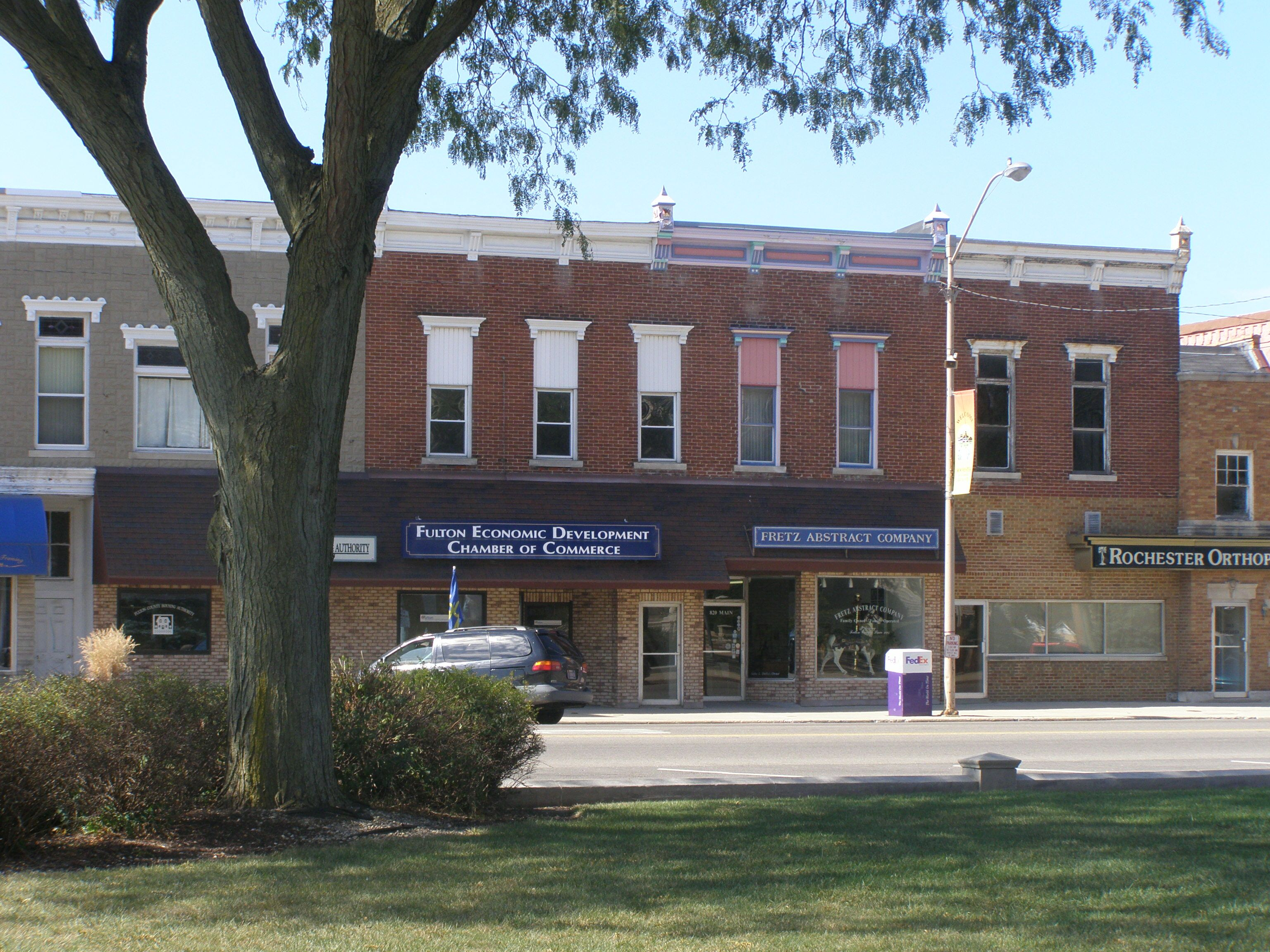
Main Street, west of the courthouse

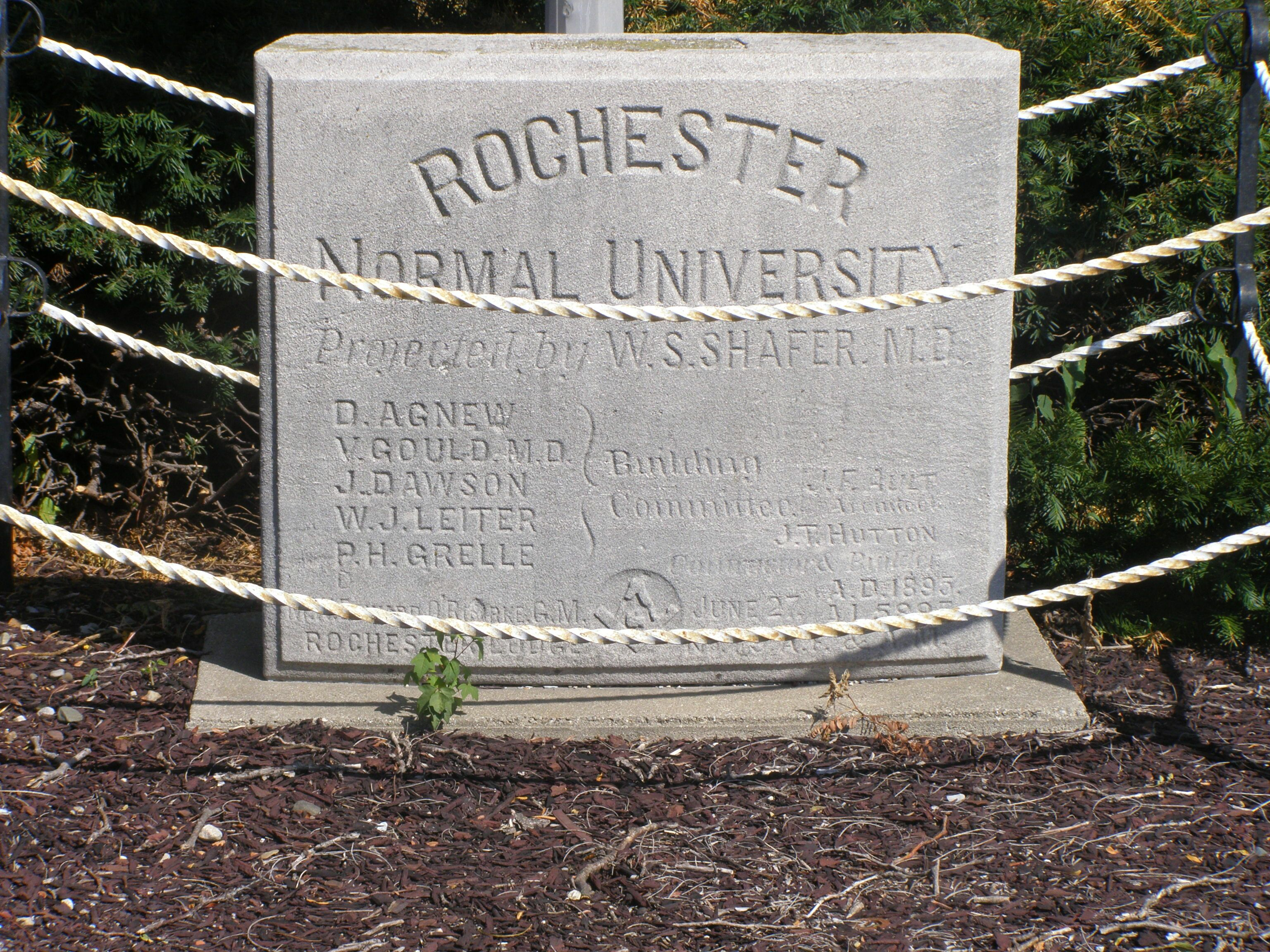
Rochester College Historic Marker

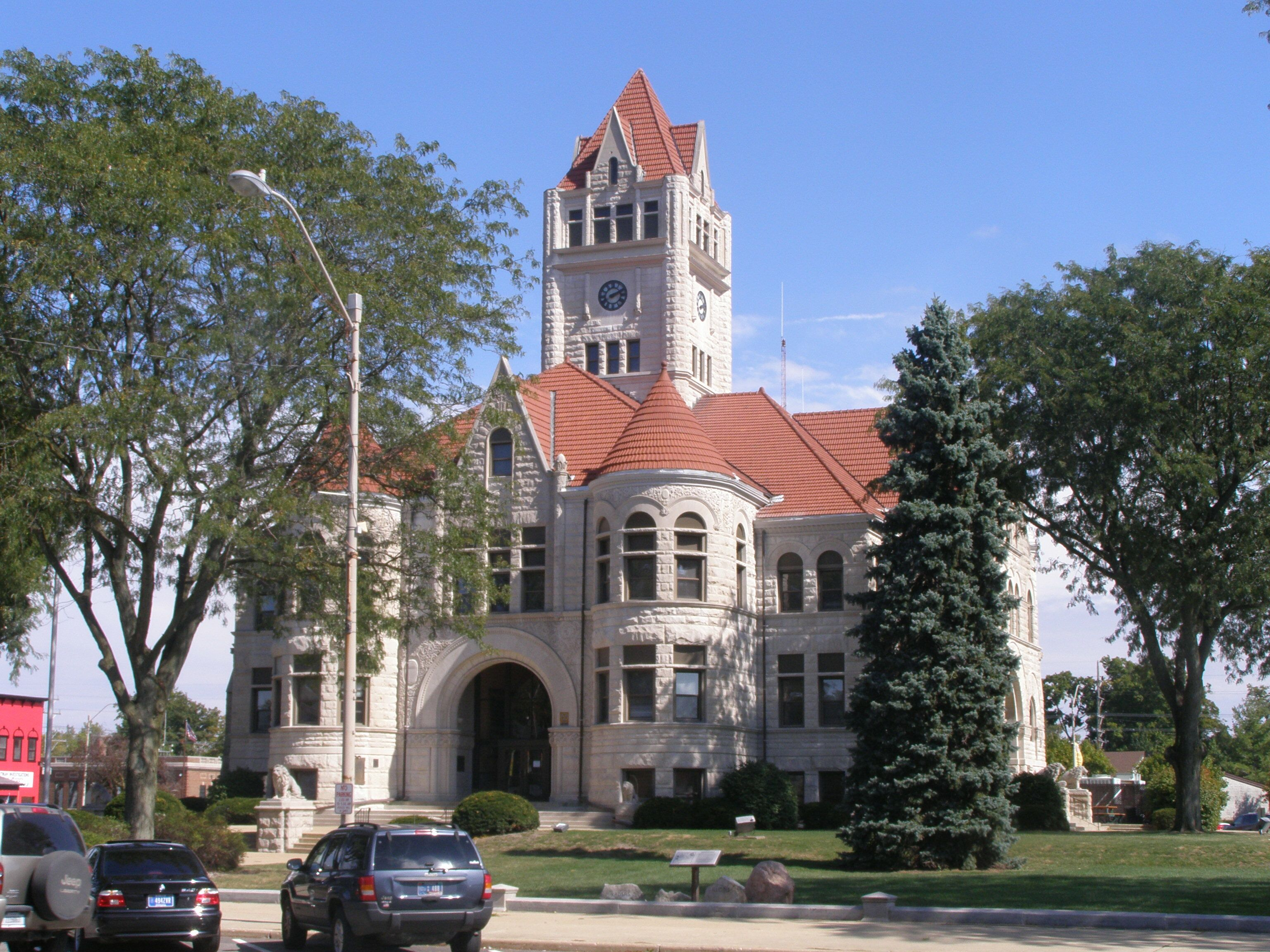
Fulton County Courthouse
