= P. Eric Turner =

American politician

Member of the Indiana House of Representatives from the 32nd district
- In office November 9, 1994 – November 30, 2014
- Preceded by: Richard A. Beck
- Succeeded by: Tony Cook

Member of the Indiana House of Representatives from the 31st district
- In office November 3, 1982 – November 5, 1986
- Preceded by: James Leroy Clingan
- Succeeded by: Richard A. Beck

Personal details
- Born: December 22, 1951 (age 74)
- Party: Republican
- Spouse: Cyndy
- Children: 4
- Education: Taylor University (BS)

Paul Eric Turner is a Republican from Indiana. He served in the Indiana House of Representatives from 1982 to 1986 and again from 1994 to 2014. Turner served on the Mississinewa School Board from 1976 to 1980. He was originally elected as a Democrat, but became a Republican on March 6, 1984. Turner was made Speaker Pro Tempore of the Indiana House of Representatives from 2008 to 2014. Turner previously ran for the State House in 1980, but lost the general election.

In 2014, Turner was the subject of several ethics investigations because of his work on trying to end a construction ban on nursing homes, which would affect his nursing home construction business. Though the investigation showed no wrongdoing, it also said he did not live up to the highest spirit of transparency. As a result, House Speaker and Majority Leader Brian Bosma (R) stripped Turner of his Speaker Pro Tempore title. A month later Turner resigned his position.

He then accepted a position with a Christian leadership ministry in Atlanta.
