= Rochester, Indiana =

City in Fulton County, Indiana

City of Rochester, Indiana
- City
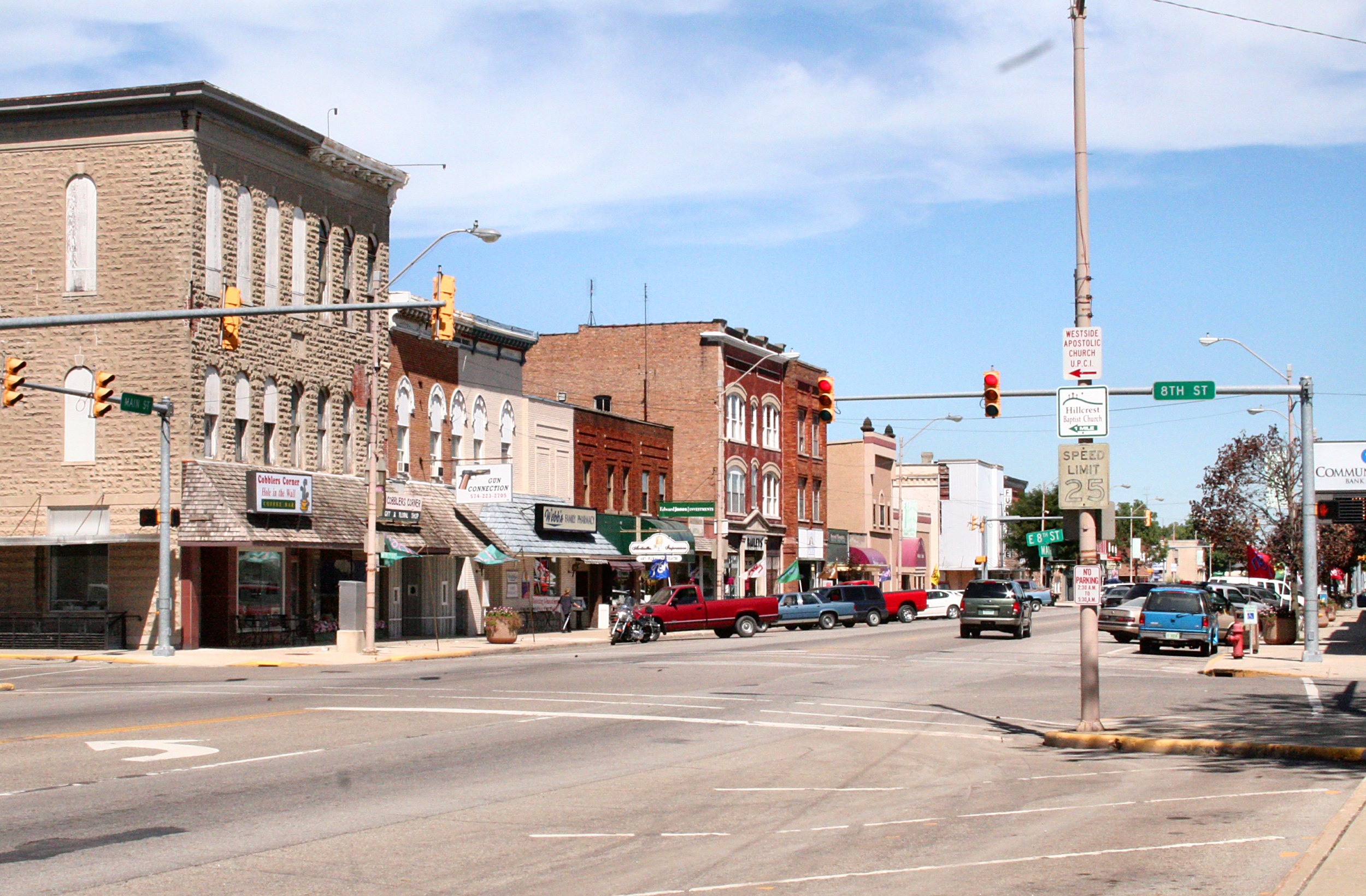
- Rochester business district

- Seal
- Motto: "The City of Friendship and Pride"
- Location of Rochester in Fulton County, Indiana
- Coordinates: 41°03′33″N 86°11′46″W
- Country: United States
- State: Indiana
- County: Fulton
- Settled: 1835; 191 years ago
- Incorporated Town: June 11, 1853; 173 years ago
- Incorporated City: October 11, 1909; 116 years ago

Government
  - Mayor: Trent Odell (R)

Area
  - Total: 5.68 sq mi (14.71 km^{2})
  - Land: 4.57 sq mi (11.84 km^{2})
  - Water: 1.11 sq mi (2.87 km^{2}) 19.14%
- Elevation: 784 ft (239 m)

Population (2020)
  - Total: 6,270
  - Density: 1,311.0/sq mi (506.19/km^{2})
- Time zone: UTC−5 (EST)
  - Summer (DST): UTC−4 (EDT)
- ZIP code: 46975
- Area code: 574
- FIPS code: 18-65214
- GNIS feature ID: 2396394
- Website: www.rochester.in.us

Rochester is a city in and the county seat of Fulton County, Indiana, United States. The population was 6,270 at the 2020 census.

== History ==
Rochester was laid out in 1835. The founder Alexander Chamberlain named it for his former hometown of Rochester, New York. The Rochester post office was established in 1836.

The Potawatomi Trail of Death came through the town in 1838.

Rochester was incorporated as a city in 1853.

The Lyman M. Brackett House, Fulton County Courthouse, Rochester Downtown Historic District, and John W. Smith House are listed on the National Register of Historic Places. The formerly listed Germany Bridge was located nearby. The Wideman-Gerig Round Barn is in use at the Round Barn Golf Club in Rochester.

In 1967, the most complete known specimen of the extinct bear Arctodus was found in a cornfield near Rochester.

In early April 1974, Indiana would be one of the states to be impacted by the super tornado outbreak. On April 3, 1974, an F4 tornado formed a few miles outside of Rochester. The tornado hit multiple houses in Rochester, also damaging Riddle Elementary School. The tornado killed 7 residents in the Rochester area before dissipating.

== Geography ==
According to the 2010 census, Rochester has a total area of 5.801 square miles (15.02 km^{2}), of which 4.69 square miles (12.15 km^{2}) (or 80.85%) is land and 1.111 square miles (2.88 km^{2}) (or 19.15%) is water.

=== Climate ===
Climate data for Rochester, Indiana (1991–2020 normals, extremes 1904–1916, 1924–present)
Month	Jan	Feb	Mar	Apr	May	Jun	Jul	Aug	Sep	Oct	Nov	Dec	Year
Record high °F (°C)	69 (21)	73 (23)	86 (30)	93 (34)	96 (36)	105 (41)	109 (43)	102 (39)	103 (39)	91 (33)	81 (27)	70 (21)	109 (43)
Mean maximum °F (°C)	54.8 (12.7)	57.2 (14.0)	70.7 (21.5)	79.8 (26.6)	87.7 (30.9)	92.2 (33.4)	92.7 (33.7)	91.6 (33.1)	89.8 (32.1)	82.3 (27.9)	68.2 (20.1)	57.3 (14.1)	94.7 (34.8)
Mean daily maximum °F (°C)	31.9 (−0.1)	35.8 (2.1)	47.1 (8.4)	60.0 (15.6)	71.3 (21.8)	80.2 (26.8)	83.2 (28.4)	81.5 (27.5)	76.0 (24.4)	63.5 (17.5)	48.9 (9.4)	37.0 (2.8)	59.7 (15.4)
Daily mean °F (°C)	24.6 (−4.1)	27.7 (−2.4)	37.7 (3.2)	49.3 (9.6)	60.6 (15.9)	70.1 (21.2)	73.0 (22.8)	71.2 (21.8)	64.6 (18.1)	53.0 (11.7)	40.5 (4.7)	30.1 (−1.1)	50.2 (10.1)
Mean daily minimum °F (°C)	17.3 (−8.2)	19.7 (−6.8)	28.3 (−2.1)	38.6 (3.7)	49.9 (9.9)	59.9 (15.5)	62.8 (17.1)	61.0 (16.1)	53.3 (11.8)	42.5 (5.8)	32.2 (0.1)	23.2 (−4.9)	40.7 (4.8)
Mean minimum °F (°C)	−3.8 (−19.9)	1.0 (−17.2)	12.4 (−10.9)	24.6 (−4.1)	35.7 (2.1)	46.0 (7.8)	50.8 (10.4)	50.5 (10.3)	40.1 (4.5)	29.1 (−1.6)	18.8 (−7.3)	5.3 (−14.8)	−7.3 (−21.8)
Record low °F (°C)	−24 (−31)	−21 (−29)	−7 (−22)	8 (−13)	24 (−4)	35 (2)	36 (2)	35 (2)	28 (−2)	14 (−10)	−4 (−20)	−30 (−34)	−30 (−34)
Average precipitation inches (mm)	2.83 (72)	2.28 (58)	2.62 (67)	3.87 (98)	4.40 (112)	4.27 (108)	4.44 (113)	4.13 (105)	3.20 (81)	3.20 (81)	3.08 (78)	2.43 (62)	40.75 (1,035)
Average snowfall inches (cm)	10.7 (27)	8.0 (20)	3.3 (8.4)	0.5 (1.3)	0.0 (0.0)	0.0 (0.0)	0.0 (0.0)	0.0 (0.0)	0.0 (0.0)	0.0 (0.0)	1.3 (3.3)	6.3 (16)	30.1 (76)
Average precipitation days (≥ 0.01 in)	9.7	7.8	9.3	10.7	11.4	10.0	8.7	8.7	7.8	9.4	9.1	9.4	112.0
Average snowy days (≥ 0.1 in)	4.6	3.2	1.4	0.2	0.0	0.0	0.0	0.0	0.0	0.0	0.6	2.7	12.7
Source: NOAA

== Demographics ==
Historical population
Census	Pop.	Note	%±
1850	283		—
1860	651		130.0%
1870	1,528		134.7%
1880	1,869		22.3%
1890	2,467		32.0%
1900	3,421		38.7%
1910	3,364		−1.7%
1920	3,720		10.6%
1930	3,518		−5.4%
1940	3,835		9.0%
1950	4,673		21.9%
1960	4,883		4.5%
1970	4,631		−5.2%
1980	5,050		9.0%
1990	5,969		18.2%
2000	6,414		7.5%
2010	6,218		−3.1%
2020	6,270		0.8%
U.S. Decennial Census

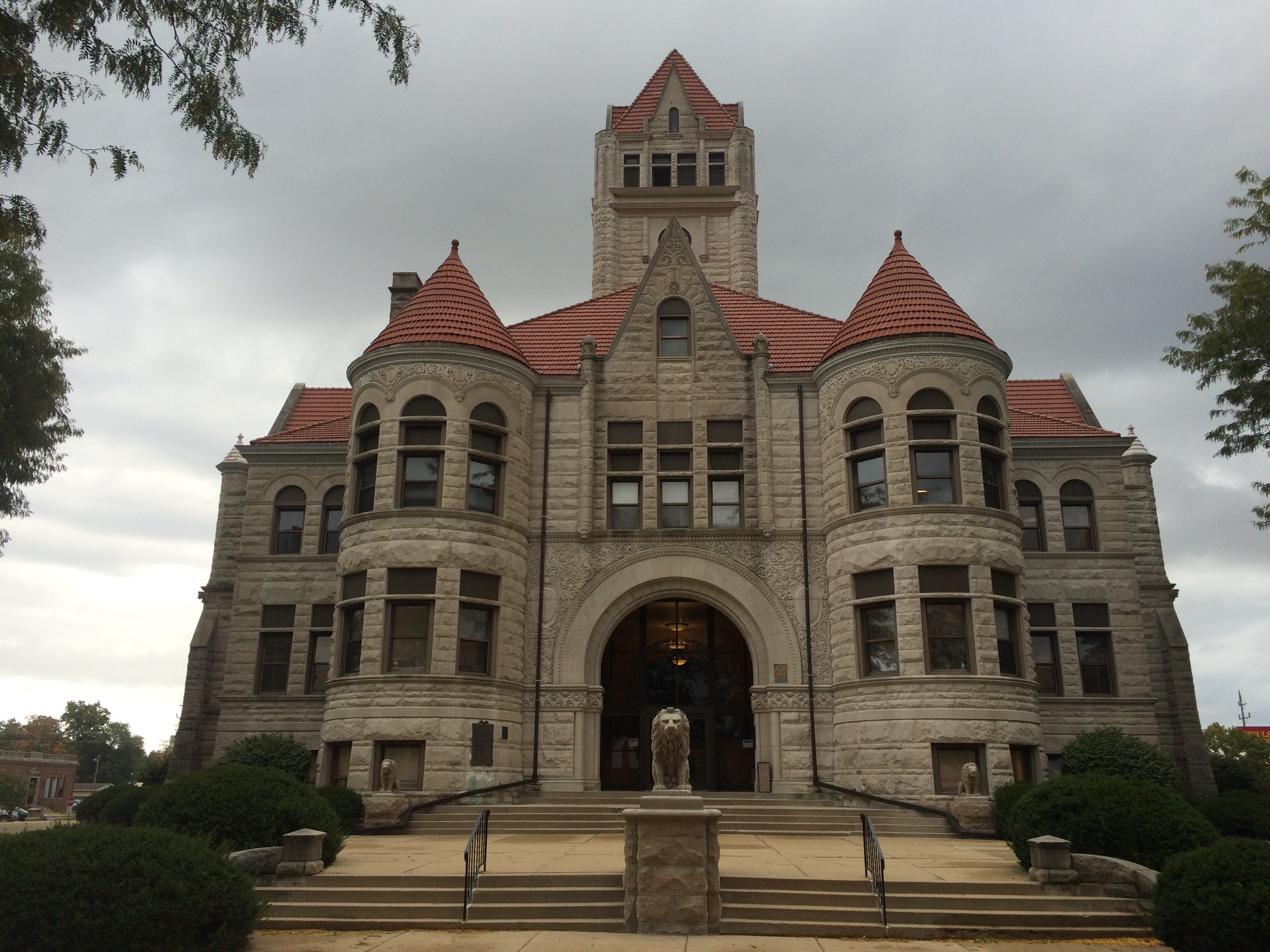

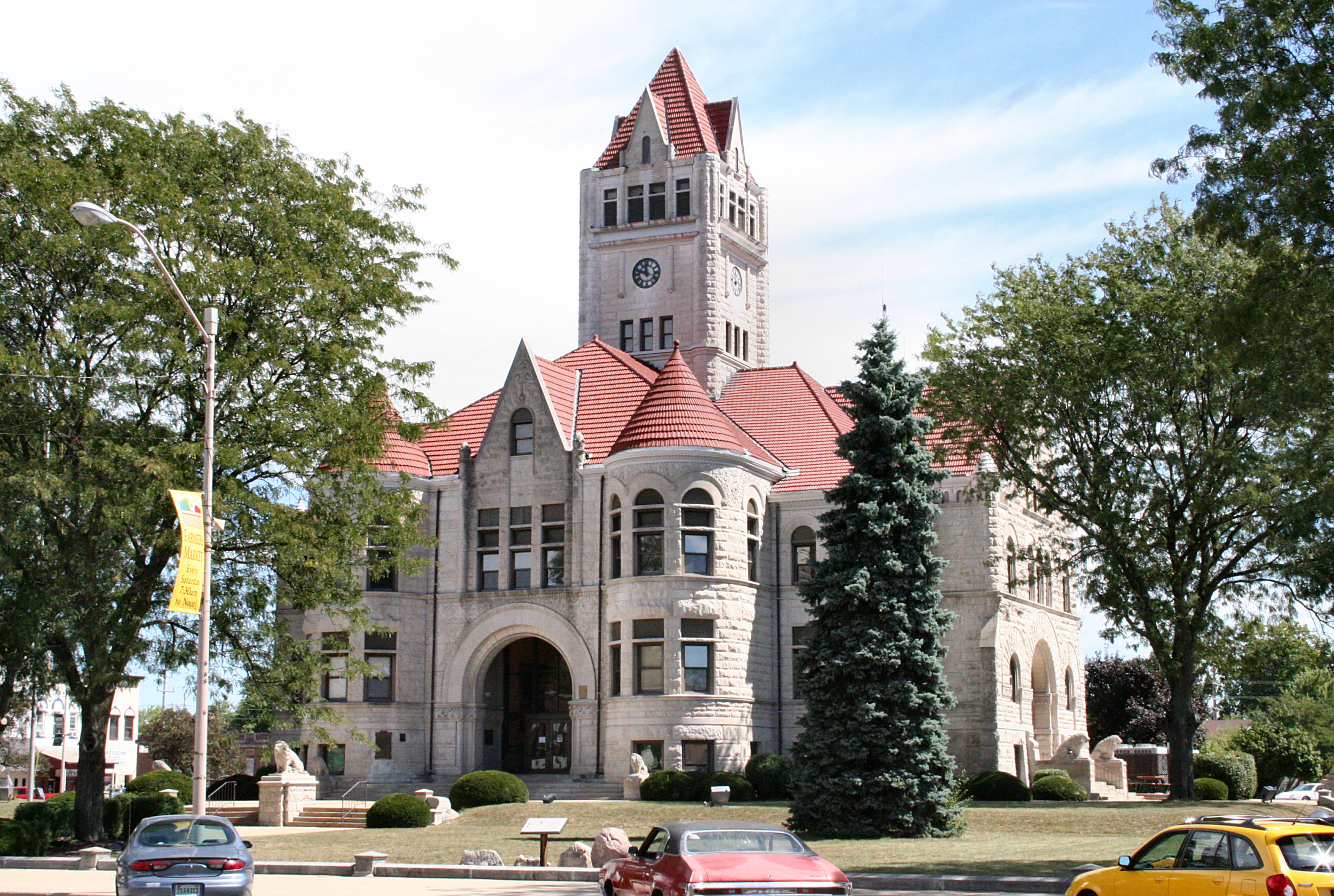
Rochester's Romanesque styled historic courthouse is guarded by stone lions.

=== 2020 census ===
As of the 2020 census, Rochester had a population of 6,270. The median age was 42.9 years. 21.4% of residents were under the age of 18 and 22.2% of residents were 65 years of age or older. For every 100 females there were 94.3 males, and for every 100 females age 18 and over there were 89.3 males age 18 and over.

99.1% of residents lived in urban areas, while 0.9% lived in rural areas.

There were 2,745 households in Rochester, of which 25.8% had children under the age of 18 living in them. Of all households, 41.1% were married-couple households, 18.6% were households with a male householder and no spouse or partner present, and 32.4% were households with a female householder and no spouse or partner present. About 36.2% of all households were made up of individuals and 17.9% had someone living alone who was 65 years of age or older.

There were 3,292 housing units, of which 16.6% were vacant. The homeowner vacancy rate was 2.3% and the rental vacancy rate was 6.9%.

Racial composition as of the 2020 census
Race	Number	Percent
White	5,756	91.8%
Black or African American	49	0.8%
American Indian and Alaska Native	23	0.4%
Asian	47	0.7%
Native Hawaiian and Other Pacific Islander	0	0.0%
Some other race	81	1.3%
Two or more races	314	5.0%
Hispanic or Latino (of any race)	307	4.9%

=== 2010 census ===
As of the census of 2010, there were 6,218 people, 2,702 households, and 1,650 families living in the city. The population density was 1,325.8 inhabitants per square mile (511.9/km^{2}). There were 3,211 housing units at an average density of 684.6 per square mile (264.3/km^{2}). The racial makeup of the city was 95.9% White, 0.6% African American, 0.4% Native American, 0.9% Asian, 1.0% from other races, and 1.2% from two or more races. Hispanic or Latino people of any race were 3.4% of the population.

Of the 2,702 households 28.2% had children under the age of 18 living with them, 43.2% were married couples living together, 13.4% had a female householder with no husband present, 4.5% had a male householder with no wife present, and 38.9% were non-families. 33.8% of households were one person and 16.1% were one person aged 65 or older. The average household size was 2.26 and the average family size was 2.84.

The median age was 41.6 years. 22.5% of residents were under the age of 18; 8.4% were between the ages of 18 and 24; 22.9% were from 25 to 44; 26.6% were from 45 to 64; and 19.5% were 65 or older. The gender makeup of the city was 47.9% male and 52.1% female.

=== 2000 census ===
At the 2000 census there were 6,414 people, 2,757 households, and 1,734 families living in the city. The population density was 1,407.4 inhabitants per square mile (543.4/km^{2}). There were 3,188 housing units at an average density of 699.5 per square mile (270.1/km^{2}). The racial makeup of the city was 96.24% White, 0.59% Native American, 0.45% African American, 0.84% Asian, 0.86% from other races, and 1.01% from two or more races. Hispanic or Latino people of any race were 1.86%.

Of the 2,757 households 26.9% had children under the age of 18 living with them, 49.5% were married couples living together, 9.4% had a female householder with no husband present, and 37.1% were non-families. 32.2% of households were one person and 16.4% were one person aged 65 or older. The average household size was 2.30 and the average family size was 2.90.

The age distribution was 23.6% under the age of 18, 7.8% from 18 to 24, 26.5% from 25 to 44, 22.3% from 45 to 64, and 19.8% 65 or older. The median age was 40 years. For every 100 females, there were 90.2 males. For every 100 females age 18 and over, there were 87.3 males.

The median household income was $33,424 and the median family income was $41,949. Males had a median income of $31,446 versus $20,796 for females. The per capita income for the city was $18,866. About 7.8% of families and 11.9% of the population were below the poverty line, including 20.4% of those under age 18 and 8.2% of those age 65 or over.

== Parks and recreation ==
Located on the east side of Rochester, Lake Manitou is a popular place in the summer for boating and other water-related activities. City Park is located on the western side of Rochester, near the high school.

== Education ==
Rochester has a public library, a branch of the Fulton County Public Library. The Rochester Community School Corporation is housed in Rochester, operating two elementary level schools (Columbia, PK-grade 1 and Riddle, grades 2–4), Rochester Middle School (grades 5–7) and Rochester Community High School (grades 8–12).

== Historic structures ==
- National Register of Historic Places listings in Fulton County, Indiana
- Rochester Downtown Historic District
- Fulton County Courthouse (Indiana)
- Lyman M. Brackett House
- John W. Smith House

== Notable people ==
- Nicole Gale Anderson, actress
- Jorge Argüello, 2011–13 Ambassador of Argentina to the United States
- Margret Holmes Bates (1844–1927), author
- Otis R. Bowen, fourth United States Secretary of Health and Human Services; born nearby
- John Angus Chamberlain, sculptor
- Thurman C. Crook, one-term U.S. congressman
- Gene DeWeese, science fiction writer; born in Rochester
- Ron Herrell, former member of the Indiana House of Representatives
- Elmo Lincoln, film actor and subject of the biography My Father, Elmo Lincoln: The Original Tarzan
- Ray Mowe, shortstop for the 1913 Brooklyn Dodgers
- Clyde Short, Chairman of the Kansas Democratic Party, 1934-1936
