= 2024 Indiana Republican presidential primary =

Party election in the United States

- May 7, 2024

58 Republican National Convention delegates

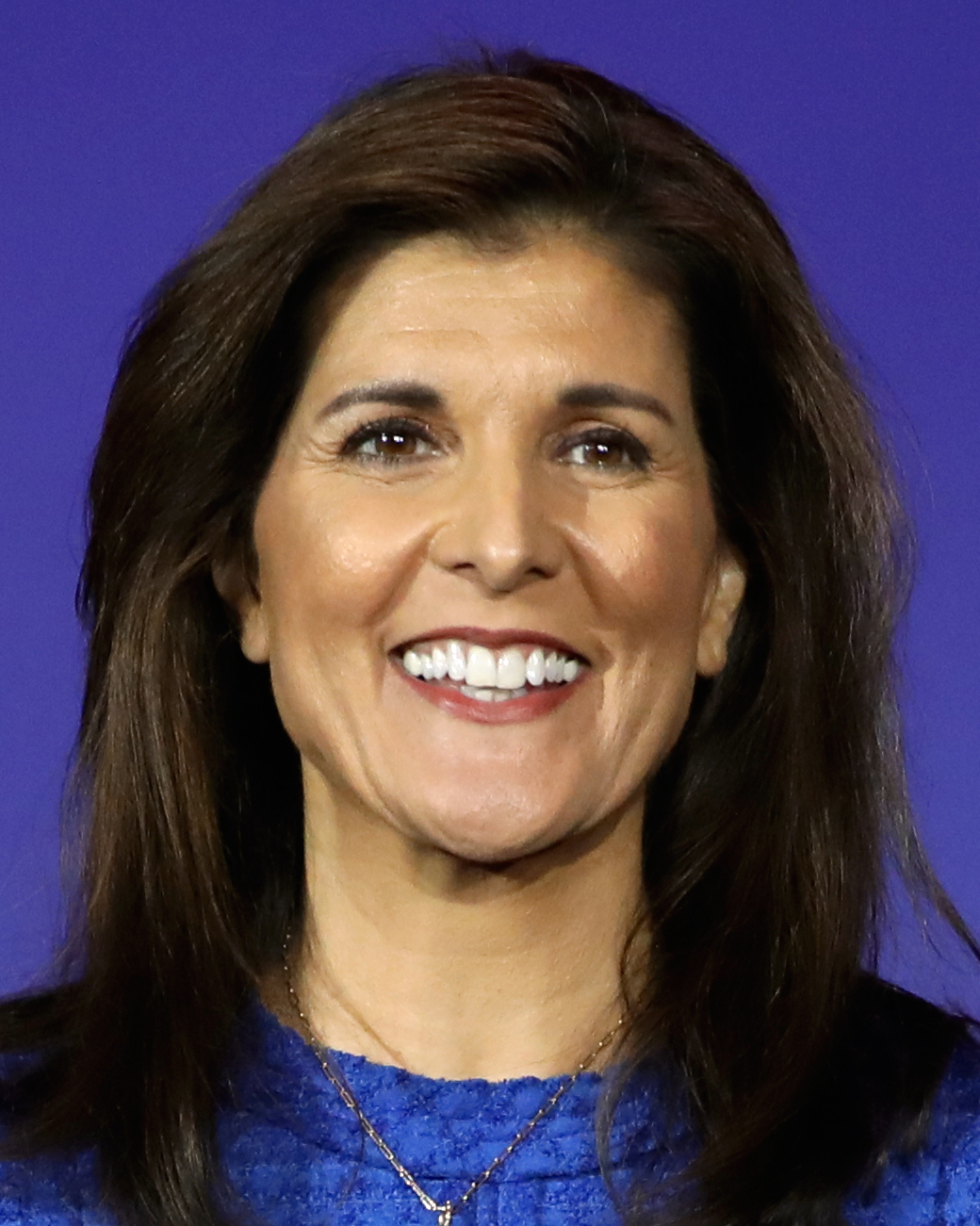
| Candidate | Donald Trump | Nikki Haley (withdrawn) |
| Home state | Florida | South Carolina |
| Delegate count | 58 | 0 |
| Popular vote | 464,399 | 128,812 |
| Percentage | 78.3% | 21.7% |
County results
Trump
60–70%
70–80%
80–90%

The 2024 Indiana Republican presidential primary was held in the US state on May 7, 2024, as part of the Republican Party primaries for the 2024 presidential election. 58 delegates to the 2024 Republican National Convention will be allocated on a winner-take-all basis.

== Endorsements ==
Chris Christie (withdrawn)

Former U.S. representative

- Susan Brooks, IN-05 (2013–2021)
Ron DeSantis (withdrawn)

State senator

- Dan Dernulc, district 1 (2022–present)

State representatives

- Bob Heaton, district 46 (2010–present)
- Chris Jeter, district 88 (2020–present)
- Shane Lindauer, district 63 (2017–present)

Notable individual

- Karen McDougal, model and alleged former mistress of Donald Trump
Mike Pence (withdrawn)

U.S. representatives

- Larry Bucshon, IN-08 (2011–present)
- Greg Pence, IN-06 (2019–present) (candidate's brother)

Governor

- Eric Holcomb (2017–2025)

State representative

- Todd Huston, district 37 (2012–present); speaker (2020–present)
Donald Trump

U.S. senator

- Mike Braun (2019–present)

U.S. representatives

- Jim Banks, IN-03 (2017–present)
- John Hostettler, IN-08 (1995–2007)
- Erin Houchin, IN-09 (2023–present)
- Marlin Stutzman, IN-03 (2010–2017)
- Rudy Yakym, IN-02 (2022–present)

State executive officials

- Diego Morales, Secretary of State of Indiana (2023–present)
- Todd Rokita, Indiana Attorney General (2021–present) and U.S. Representative of IN-04 (2011–2019)
Declined to endorse

U.S. senator

- Todd Young (2017–present)

U.S. vice president

- Mike Pence (2017–2021), Governor of Indiana (2013–2017), Representative from Indiana (2001–2013), and withdrawn candidate in 2024

== Maps ==
Endorsements by incumbent Republicans in the Indiana Senate. Endorsed Donald Trump (2) No endorsement (38)

== Results ==
Indiana Republican primary, May 7, 2024
| Candidate | Votes | Percentage | Actual delegate count | | |
| Candidate | Votes | Percentage | Bound | Unbound | Total |
|---|---|---|---|---|---|
| Donald Trump | 461,678 | 78.3% | 58 | | |
| Nikki Haley (withdrawn) | 128,170 | 21.7% | | | |
| Total: | 589,848 | 100.0% | 58 | | 58 |

== Polling ==
| Poll source | Date(s) administered | Sample size | Margin of error | Ron DeSantis | Nikki Haley | Mike Pence | Donald Trump | Other | Undecided |
|---|---|---|---|---|---|---|---|---|---|
| Bellwether Research & Consulting | Dec 11–17, 2022 | 457 (LV) | – | 28% | 3% | 13% | 39% | 1% (Note: Mike Pompeo with 1%) | 15% |

== See also ==
- 2024 Indiana Democratic presidential primary
- 2024 Republican Party presidential primaries
- 2024 United States presidential election
- 2024 United States presidential election in Indiana
- 2024 United States elections
