= 2026 United States House of Representatives elections in Indiana =

- November 3, 2026

All 9 Indiana seats to the United States House of Representatives
	Majority party	Minority party
Party	Republican	Democratic
Last election	7	2
Seats won	6	3
Seat change	▼1	▲1
Popular vote	926,490	996,768
Percentage	47.78%	51.40%
Swing	▼10.40%	▲12.93%

Republican hold
Democratic hold Democratic gain
Republican
40–50%
50–60%
60–70%
70–80%
Democratic
40–50%
50–60%
60–70%
70–80%

The 2026 United States House of Representatives elections in Indiana were held on November 3, 2026, to elect the nine U.S. representatives from the state of Indiana, one from each of the state's congressional districts. The elections coincided with other elections to the House of Representatives, elections to the United States Senate, and various state and local elections. The primary elections took place on May 5, 2026.

Democrats won a majority of Indiana's U.S. House popular vote again for the first time since 2008. This was first time since 1990 Democrats won the 5th district.

== Failed redistricting attempt ==
In late 2025, as part of the broader 2025 U.S. redistricting cycle, President Donald Trump urged Indiana to redraw its congressional map to unseat Democratic Representatives Frank Mrvan (1st district) and André Carson (7th district). The proposal faced unexpected resistance in the Republican-supermajority Senate, with more than a dozen Republicans opposing it. Trump sought to pressure holdouts by threatening to back primary challengers against those who voted no. Separately, several senators received threats, including bomb threats and swatting calls, ahead of the vote. The measure passed the House 57–41 on December 5, with twelve Republicans joining all Democrats in opposition, but failed in the Senate on December 11 by a 31–19 vote, as 21 Republicans joined all 10 Democrats to defeat it.

== District 1 ==
2026 Indiana's 1st congressional district election
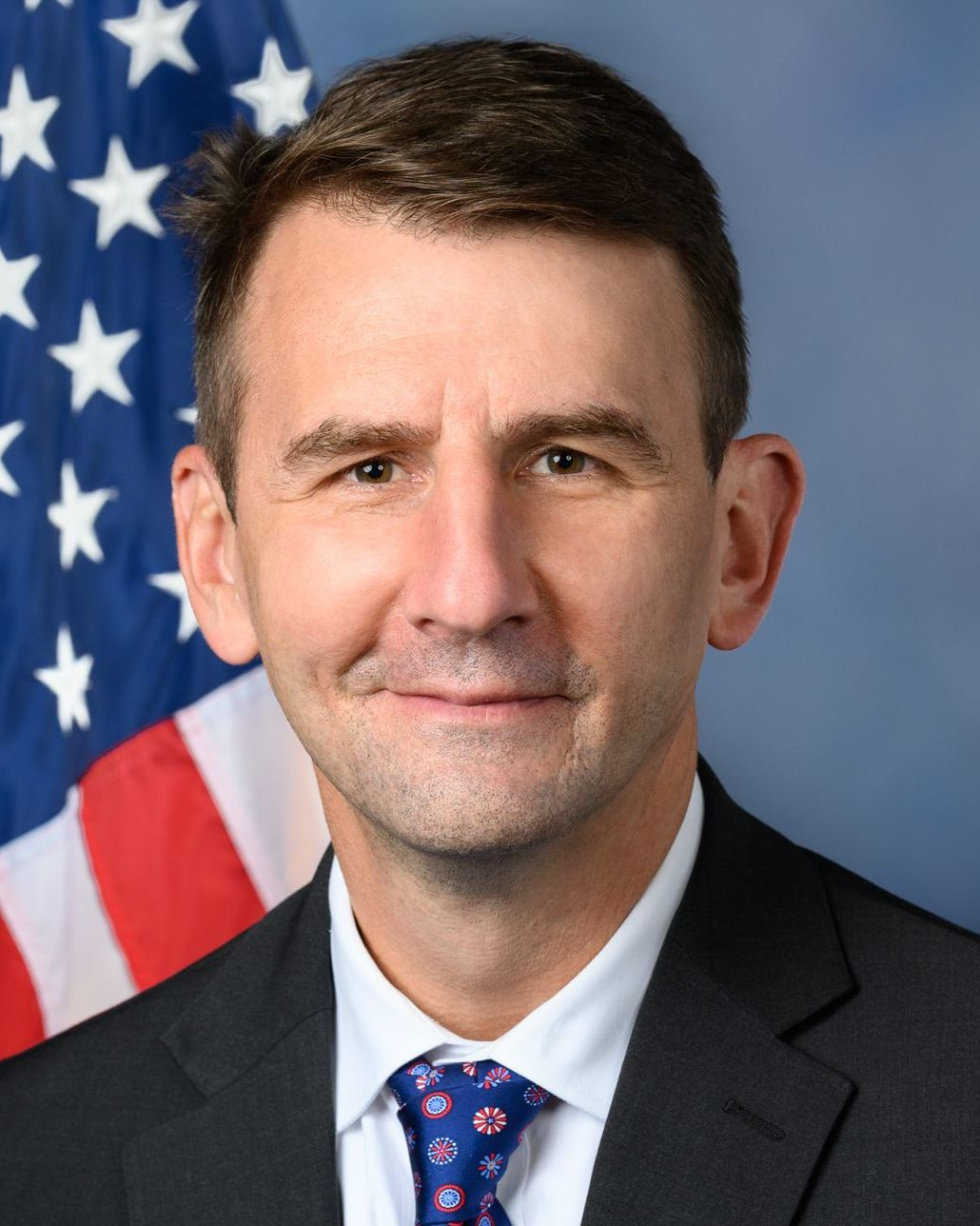

Nominee	Frank Mrvan	Barb Regnitz
Party	Democratic	Republican
Popular vote	142,213	83,468
Percentage	63.0%	37.0%
- Mrvan: 50–60% 60–70% 70–80% 80–90% >90% Regnitz: 50–60% 60–70% 70–80% >90% Tie: 50% No votes
U.S. Representative before election
Frank J. Mrvan
Democratic
Elected U.S. Representative
Frank J. Mrvan
Democratic

The 1st district encompasses Northwest Indiana, taking in the eastern Chicago metropolitan area, including Hammond and Gary, as well as Lake County, Porter County and northwest LaPorte County. The incumbent is Democrat Frank Mrvan, who was re-elected with 53.4% of the vote in 2024.

=== Democratic primary ===
==== Nominee ====
- Frank Mrvan, incumbent U.S. representative

==== Eliminated in primary ====
- LaVetta Sparks-Wade, former Gary city councilor

==== Endorsements ====
Frank Mrvan

Labor Unions

- National Education Association

Organizations

- AIPAC
- Giffords
- Indiana Farm Bureau AgELECT PAC
- Jewish Democratic Council of America
- Joint Action Committee for Political Affairs
- League of Conservation Voters Action Fund
- Planned Parenthood Action Fund
- Population Connection
- Reproductive Freedom for All

==== Fundraising ====
Campaign finance reports as of April 15, 2026
Candidate	Raised	Spent	Cash on hand
Frank Mrvan (D)	$1,873,695	$873,154	$1,088,950
Source: Federal Election Commission

==== Results ====
Results by county: Mrvan: 70–80%; 80–90%

Democratic primary results
Party	Candidate	Votes	%
Democratic	Frank Mrvan (incumbent)	42,519	80.2
Democratic	LaVetta Sparks-Wade	10,467	19.8
Total votes		52,986	100.0

=== Republican primary ===
==== Nominee ====
- Barb Regnitz, Porter County commissioner (2023–present)

==== Eliminated in primary ====
- Ben Ruiz, vice precinct committeeman and candidate for this district in 2022 and 2024
- Jim Schenke, news producer and nominee for HD-26 in 2024

==== Removed from ballot ====
- Richard "Sieg Heil" Mayers, white supremacist and perennial candidate (ran for U.S. Senate in Alaska, as well as Cook County Board of Commissioners President, Treasurer, Assessor, Board of Commissioners, and Governor of Illinois)

==== Withdrawn ====
- Jennifer-Ruth Green, former Indiana Secretary of Public Safety and nominee for this district in 2022

==== Declined ====
- Randy Niemeyer, Lake County councilor, chair of the Lake County Republican Party, and nominee for this district in 2024

==== Endorsements ====
Barb Regnitz

U.S. senators

- Jim Banks, Indiana (2025–present)
- Todd Young, Indiana (2017–present)

U.S. representatives

- Erin Houchin, IN-09 (2023–present)
- Marlin Stutzman, IN-03 (2010–2017, 2025–present)
- Rudy Yakym, IN-02 (2022–present)

Organizations

- Log Cabin Republicans
- Maggie's List

==== Fundraising ====
Campaign finance reports as of April 15, 2026
Candidate	Raised	Spent	Cash on hand
Barb Regnitz (R)	$1,640,600 (Note: 1,500,000 of this total was self-funded by Regnitz.)	$463,688	$1,176,912
Ben Ruiz (R)	$1,252	$1,799	$0
Jim Schenke (R)	$58,804	$52,768	$6,036
Source: Federal Election Commission

==== Results ====
Results by county: Regnitz: 40–50%; 60–70%; Schenke: 30–40%

Republican primary results
Party	Candidate	Votes	%
Republican	Barb Regnitz	13,007	45.8
Republican	James Kent Schenke	8,562	30.1
Republican	Ben Ruiz	6,852	24.1
Total votes		28,421	100.0

=== General election ===
==== Predictions ====
Source	Ranking	As of
Decision Desk HQ	Safe D	September 8, 2026
The Cook Political Report	Likely D	February 6, 2025
Inside Elections	Likely D	June 11, 2026
Sabato's Crystal Ball	Likely D	May 6, 2026
Silver Bulletin	Solid D	August 20, 2026

==== Post-primary endorsements ====
Frank Mrvan (D)

Labor unions

- Indiana State AFL-CIO

Organizations

- J Street

==== Fundraising ====
Campaign finance reports as of October 14, 2026
Candidate	Raised	Spent	Cash on hand
Frank Mrvan (D)	$3,035,422	$2,351,655	$772,227
Barb Regnitz (R)	$2,755,770 (Note: 1,500,000 of this total was self-funded by Regnitz.)	$2,251,535	$504,235
Source: Federal Election Commission

==== Results ====
2026 Indiana's 1st congressional district election
Party	Candidate	Votes	%	±%
Democratic	Frank Mrvan (incumbent)	142,213	63.0	
Republican	Barb Regnitz	83,468	37.0	
Total votes		225,681	100.0	

== District 2 ==
2026 Indiana's 2nd congressional district election
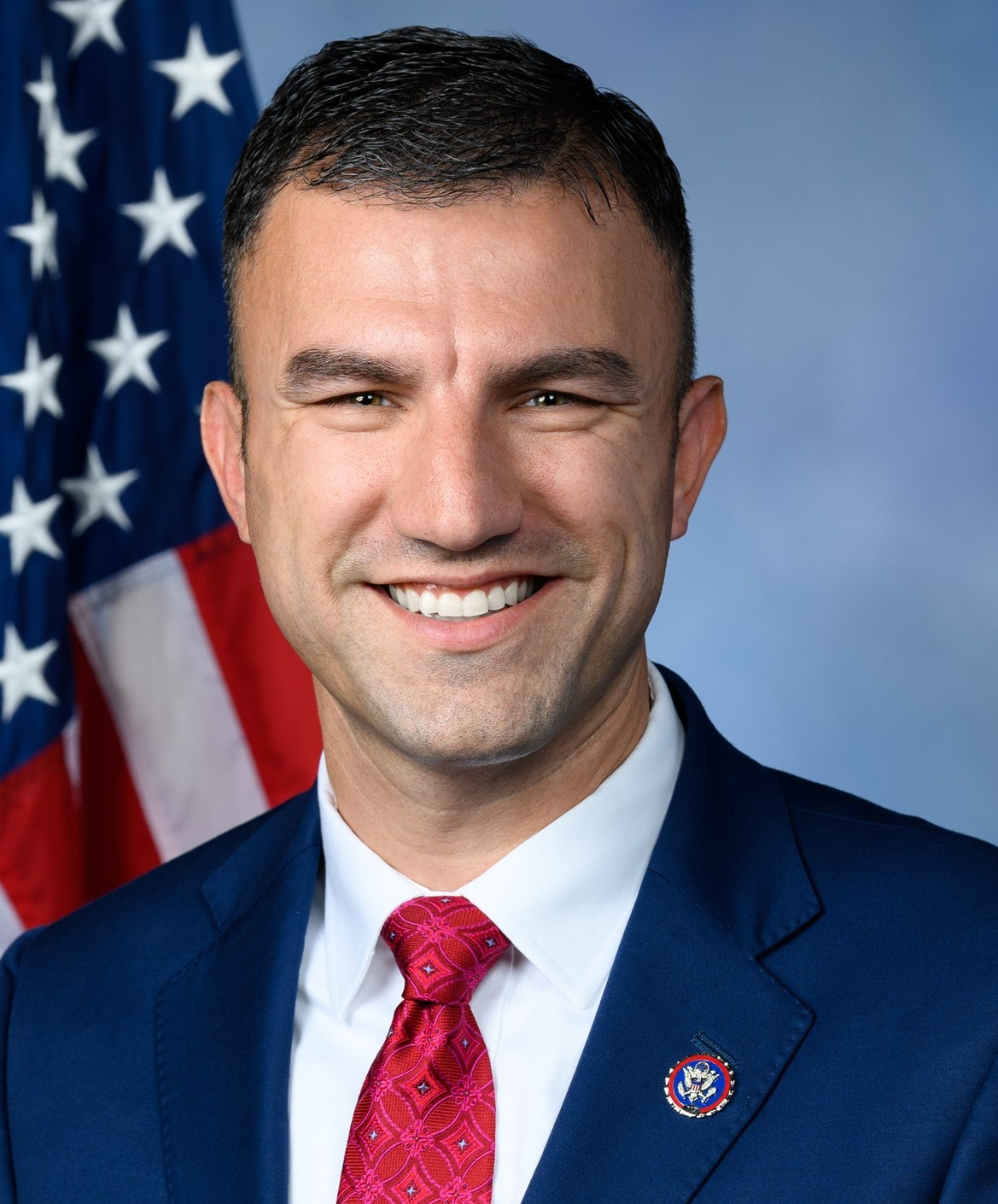

Nominee	Rudy Yakym	Jamee Decio
Party	Republican	Democratic
Popular vote	99,148	89,173
Percentage	51.3%	46.1%
- Yakym: 40–50% 50–60% 60–70% 70–80% 80–90% Decio: 40–50% 50–60% 60–70% 70–80% 80–90% >90% Tie: 40–50% Other No votes
U.S. Representative before election
Rudy Yakym
Republican
Elected U.S. Representative
Rudy Yakym
Republican

The 2nd district is located in north central Indiana taking in Michiana, including South Bend, Mishawaka, Elkhart, and Warsaw. The incumbent is Republican Rudy Yakym, who was re-elected with 62.7% of the vote in 2024.

=== Republican primary ===
==== Nominee ====
- Rudy Yakym, incumbent U.S. representative

==== Endorsements ====
Rudy Yakym

Organizations

- AIPAC

==== Fundraising ====
Campaign finance reports as of April 15, 2026
Candidate	Raised	Spent	Cash on hand
Rudy Yakym (R)	$4,026,298	$3,517,775	$1,118,102
Source: Federal Election Commission

==== Results ====
Republican primary results
Party	Candidate	Votes	%
Republican	Rudy Yakym (incumbent)	41,228	100.0
Total votes		41,228	100.0

=== Democratic primary ===
==== Nominee ====
- Jamee Decio, attorney

==== Eliminated in primary ====
- Shaun Maeyens, middle school teacher

==== Fundraising ====
Campaign finance reports as of April 15, 2026
Candidate	Raised	Spent	Cash on hand
Jamee Decio (D)	$279,879	$141,898	$137,981
Source: Federal Election Commission

==== Results ====
Results by county: Allen: 50–60%; 60–70%; 70–80%; 80–90%

Democratic primary results
Party	Candidate	Votes	%
Democratic	Jamee Decio	18,142	72.1
Democratic	Shaun Maeyens	7,027	27.9
Total votes		25,169	100.0

=== Libertarian convention ===
==== Nominated ====
- William Henry, nominee for this district in 2024

=== General election ===
==== Predictions ====
Source	Ranking	As of
Decision Desk HQ	Safe R	July 14, 2026
The Cook Political Report	Safe R	February 6, 2025
Inside Elections	Safe R	March 7, 2025
Sabato's Crystal Ball	Safe R	July 15, 2025
Silver Bulletin	Solid R	August 20, 2026

==== Fundraising ====
Campaign finance reports as of June 30, 2026
Candidate	Raised	Spent	Cash on hand
Rudy Yakym (R)	$5,246,030	$5,000,296	$855,313
Jamee Decio (D)	$355,589	$251,093	$104,496
William Henry (L)	$0	$0	$0
Source: Federal Election Commission

== District 3 ==
2026 Indiana's 3rd congressional district election
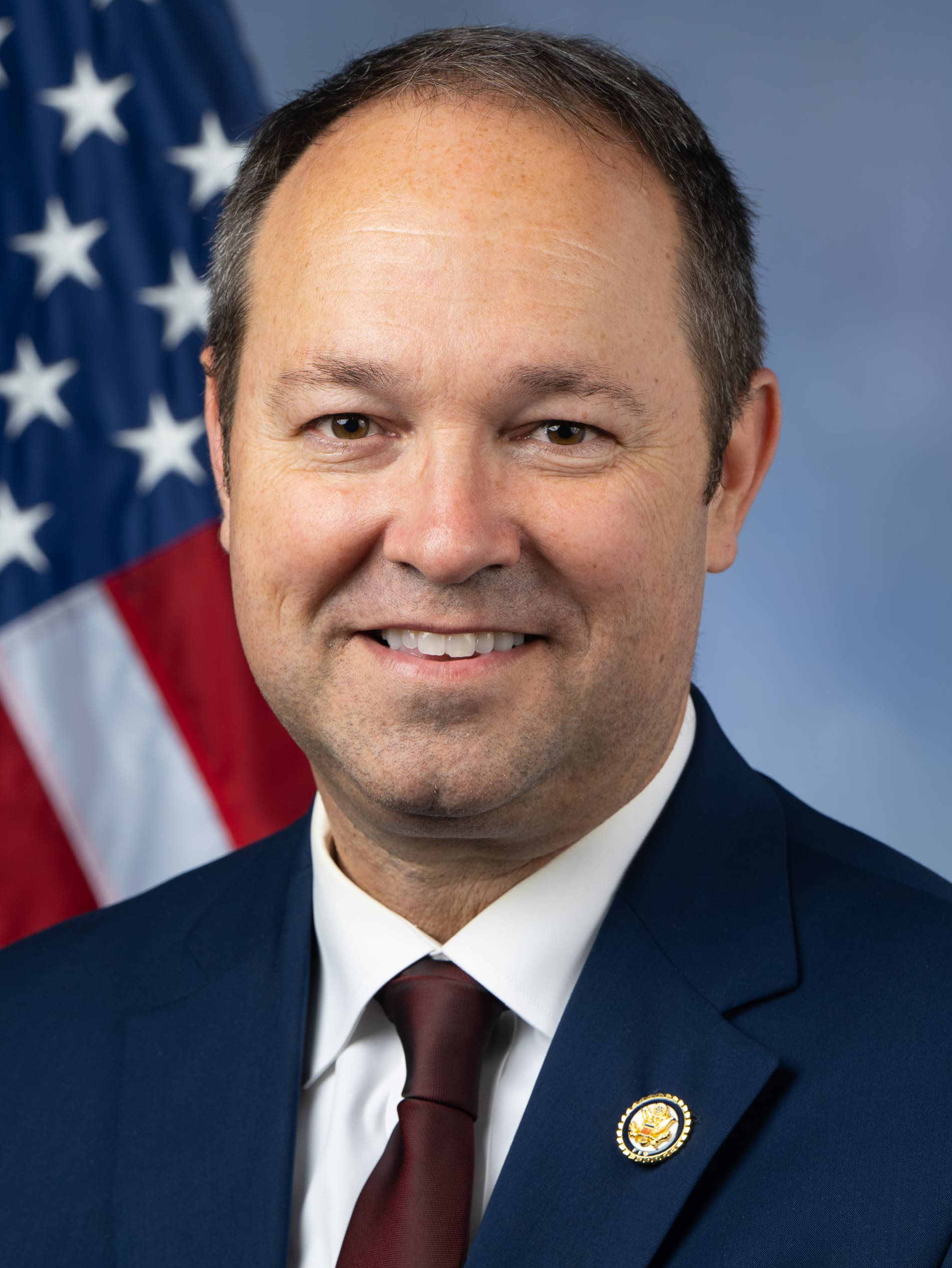

Nominee	Marlin Stutzman	Kelly Thompson
Party	Republican	Democratic
Popular vote	109,692	90,180
Percentage	54.9%	45.1%
- Stutzman: 50–60% 60–70% 70–80% 80–90% >90% Thompson: 50–60% 60–70% 70–80% 80–90% >90% Tie: 50% No votes
U.S. Representative before election
Marlin Stutzman
Republican
Elected U.S. Representative
Marlin Stutzman
Republican

The 3rd District encompasses Northeast Indiana, which is anchored by the Fort Wayne metropolitan area, also includes the cities of Huntington, Auburn, Angola, Bluffton, Decatur, and Kendallville. The incumbent is Republican Marlin Stutzman, who was elected with 65.0% of the vote in 2024.

=== Republican primary ===
==== Nominee ====
- Marlin Stutzman, incumbent U.S. representative

==== Eliminated in primary ====
- Jon Kenworthy, staffer for former Senator Mike Braun and candidate for this district in 2024

==== Endorsements ====
Marlin Stutzman

Executive branch officials

- Donald Trump, 45th and 47th president of the United States (2017–2021, 2025–present)

Organizations

- AIPAC
- Freedom Caucus Fund
- NRA Political Victory Fund

==== Fundraising ====
Campaign finance reports as of December 31, 2025
Candidate	Raised	Spent	Cash on hand
Marlin Stutzman (R)	$618,303	$446,300	$221,320
Source: Federal Election Commission

==== Results ====
Results by county: Stutzman: 50–60%; 60–70%; 70–80%; Kenworthy: 60–70%

Republican primary results
Party	Candidate	Votes	%
Republican	Marlin Stutzman (incumbent)	39,730	68.2
Republican	Jon Kenworthy	18,543	31.8
Total votes		58,273	100.0

=== Democratic primary ===
==== Nominee ====
- Kelly Thompson, nonprofit founder and nominee for Indiana's 22nd House district in 2020

==== Fundraising ====
Campaign finance reports as of December 31, 2025
Candidate	Raised	Spent	Cash on hand
Kelly Thompson (D)	$56,687	$43,633	$13,054
Source: Federal Election Commission

==== Results ====
Democratic primary results
Party	Candidate	Votes	%
Democratic	Kelly Thompson	21,146	100.0
Total votes		21,146	100.0

=== Independent ===
==== Declared ====
- Phillip D. Beachy, semi-retired carpenter and refrigerator technician (write in)

=== General election ===
==== Predictions ====
Source	Ranking	As of
Decision Desk HQ	Safe R	July 14, 2026
The Cook Political Report	Safe R	February 6, 2025
Inside Elections	Safe R	March 7, 2025
Sabato's Crystal Ball	Safe R	July 15, 2025
Silver Bulletin	Solid R	August 20, 2026

==== Post-primary endorsements ====
Marlin Stutzman (R)

Organizations

- U.S. Chamber of Commerce
Kelly Thompson (D)

Labor unions

- Indiana State AFL-CIO

Organizations

- National Organization for Women

==== Fundraising ====
Campaign finance reports as of June 30, 2026
Candidate	Raised	Spent	Cash on hand
Marlin Stutzman (R)	$839,564	$786,959	$101,922
Kelly Thompson (D)	$136,340	$130,300	$6,039
Source: Federal Election Commission

==== Results ====
2026 Indiana's 3rd congressional district election
Party	Candidate	Votes	%	±%
Republican	Marlin Stutzman (incumbent)	109,692	54.9	
Democratic	Kelly Thompson	90,180	45.1	
Total votes		199,872	100.0	

== District 4 ==
2026 Indiana's 4th congressional district election
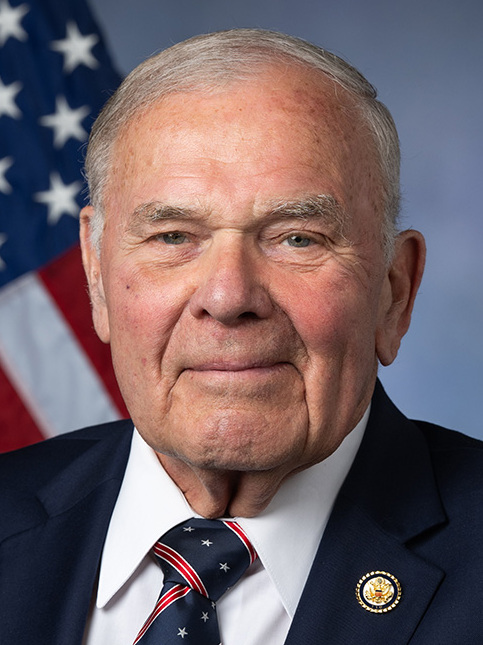

Nominee	Jim Baird	Drew Cox
Party	Republican	Democratic
Popular vote	115,140	97,178
Percentage	54.2%	45.8%
- Baird: 50–60% 60–70% 70–80% 80–90% >90% Cox: 50–60% 60–70% 70–80% 80–90% >90% Tie: 50% No votes
U.S. Representative before election
Jim Baird
Republican
Elected U.S. Representative
Jim Baird
Republican

The 4th district is located in west-central Indiana taking in Lafayette and the western suburbs of Indianapolis. The incumbent is Republican Jim Baird, who was re-elected with 64.8% of the vote in 2024.

=== Republican primary ===
==== Nominee ====
- Jim Baird, incumbent U.S. representative

==== Eliminated in primary ====
- Craig Haggard, state representative for the 57th district (2022–present)
- John Piper, restaurateur and candidate for this district in 2024

==== Endorsements ====
Jim Baird

Executive branch officials

- Donald Trump, president of the United States (2017–2021, 2025–present)

U.S. representatives

- Jim Jordan, OH-04 (2007–present)

Organizations

- AIPAC
- Indiana Farm Bureau AgELECT PAC
- NRA Political Victory Fund
Craig Haggard

Statewide officials

- Todd Rokita, attorney general of Indiana (2021–present) and former IN-04 (2011–2019)

Organizations

- Armenian National Committee of America

==== Fundraising ====
Campaign finance reports as of December 31, 2025
Candidate	Raised	Spent	Cash on hand
Jim Baird (R)	$194,545	$268,477	$140,677
Craig Haggard (R)	$118,710	$57,627	$121,725
Source: Federal Election Commission

==== Results ====
Results by county: Baird: 40–50%; 50–60%; 60–70%; 70–80%

Republican primary results
Party	Candidate	Votes	%
Republican	Jim Baird (incumbent)	37,855	60.5
Republican	Craig Haggard	19,102	30.5
Republican	John Piper	5,596	8.9
Total votes		62,553	100.0

=== Democratic primary ===
==== Nominee ====
- Drew Cox, veteran and instructor at Purdue University

==== Eliminated in primary ====
- Roger Day, retiree and nominee for this district in 2022
- Darin Patrick Griesey, farmer
- Thomas Hall, welder
- Robert Lovely
- Joe Mackey, retired machinist and nominee for this district in 2020
- Jayden McCash, truck driver
- Paul McPherson, engineer and instructor at Purdue University
- John Whetstone, game store owner

==== Endorsements ====
Drew Cox

Organizations

- Track AIPAC

==== Fundraising ====
Campaign finance reports as of December 31, 2025
Candidate	Raised	Spent	Cash on hand
Joe Mackey (D)	$150	$0	$150
Source: Federal Election Commission

==== Results ====
Results by county: Cox: 20–30%; 30–40%; Mackey: 20–30%; 30–40%; McPherson: 30–40%

Democratic primary results
Party	Candidate	Votes	%
Democratic	Drew Cox	7,550	30.4
Democratic	Joe Mackey	5,671	22.8
Democratic	Paul McPherson	3,136	12.6
Democratic	Jayden McCash	1,965	7.9
Democratic	Darin Patrick Griesey	1,711	6.9
Democratic	John Whetstone	1,699	6.8
Democratic	Thomas Hall	1,635	6.6
Democratic	Roger Day	1,507	6.1
Total votes		24,874	100.0

=== General election ===
==== Predictions ====
Source	Ranking	As of
Decision Desk HQ	Safe R	July 14, 2026
The Cook Political Report	Safe R	February 6, 2025
Inside Elections	Safe R	March 7, 2025
Sabato's Crystal Ball	Safe R	July 15, 2025
Silver Bulletin	Solid R	August 20, 2026

==== Post-primary endorsements ====
Drew Cox (D)

Labor unions

- Indiana State AFL-CIO

==== Fundraising ====
Campaign finance reports as of June 30, 2026
Candidate	Raised	Spent	Cash on hand
Jim Baird (R)	$358,292	$481,341	$91,560
Drew Cox (D)	$20,377	$13,514	$6,862
Source: Federal Election Commission

==== Results ====
2026 Indiana's 4th congressional district election
Party	Candidate	Votes	%	±%
Republican	Jim Baird (incumbent)	115,014	54.2	
Democratic	Drew Cox	97,142	45.8	
Total votes		212,156	100.0	

== District 5 ==
2026 Indiana's 5th congressional district election
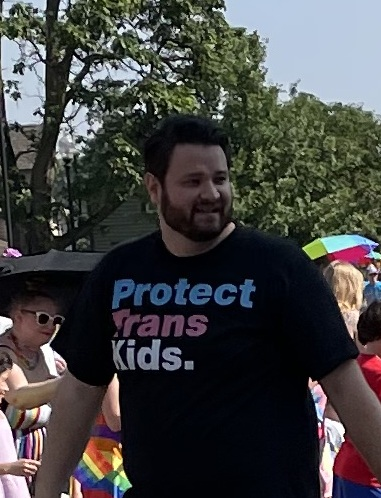

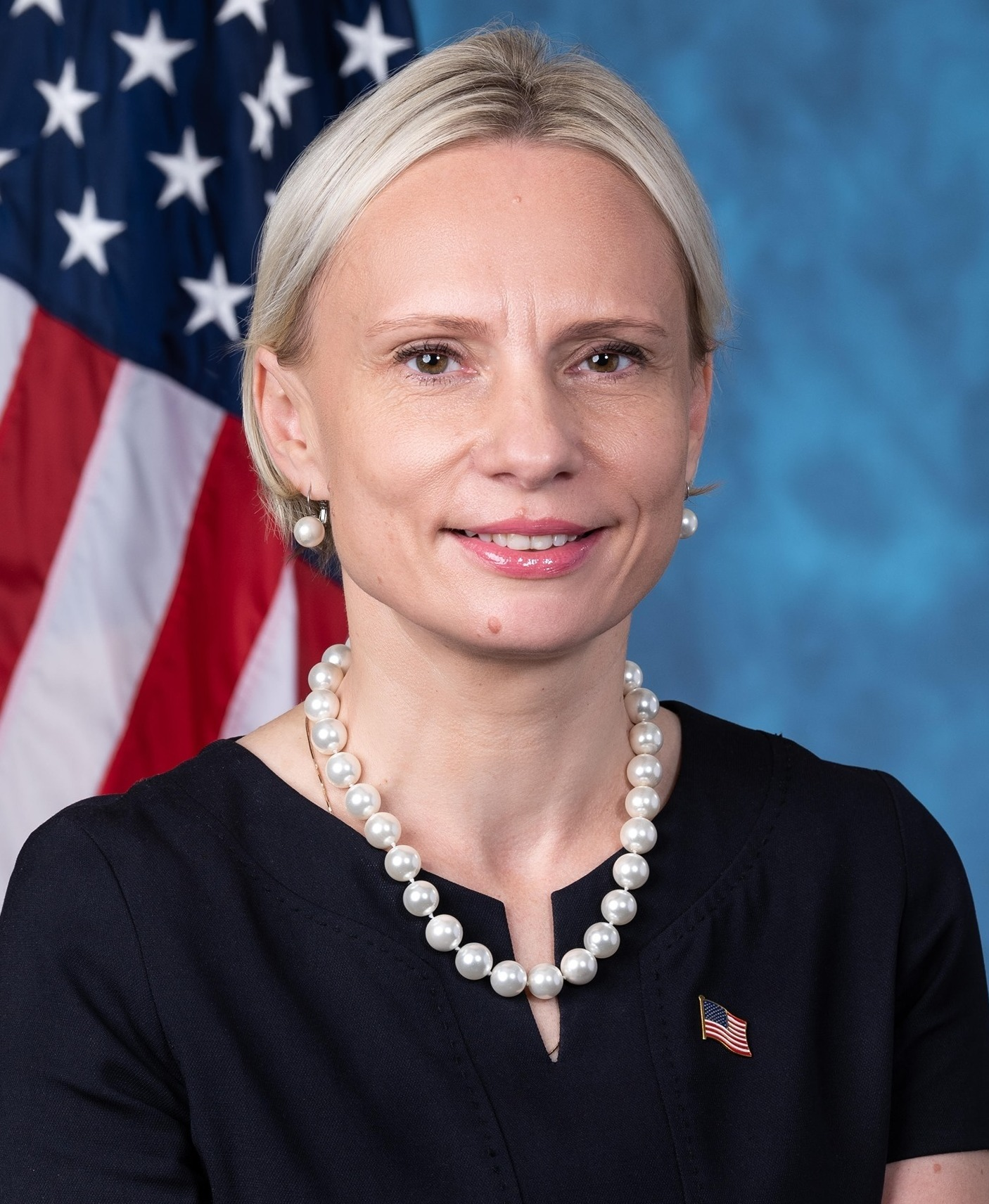
Nominee	J. D. Ford	Victoria Spartz
Party	Democratic	Republican
Popular vote	134,476	125,851
Percentage	51.7%	48.3%
- Ford: 50–60% 60–70% 70–80% 80–90% >90% Spartz: 50–60% 60–70% 70–80% 80–90% >90% Tie: 50% No votes
U.S. Representative before election
Victoria Spartz
Republican
Elected U.S. Representative
J. D. Ford
Democratic

The 5th district encompasses suburbs north of Indianapolis including Carmel, Fishers, and Noblesville, as well as the cities of Muncie, Marion, and parts of Kokomo. The incumbent is Republican Victoria Spartz, who was re-elected with 56.6% of the vote in 2024.

=== Republican primary ===
==== Nominee ====
- Victoria Spartz, incumbent U.S. representative

==== Eliminated in primary ====
- Scott King

==== Endorsements ====
Victoria Spartz

Executive branch officials

- Donald Trump, president of the United States (2017–2021, 2025–present)

Organizations

- AIPAC
- Maggie's List
- NRA Political Victory Fund

==== Fundraising ====
Campaign finance reports as of December 31, 2025
Candidate	Raised	Spent	Cash on hand
Victoria Spartz (R)	$1,012,879	$1,061,417	$209,511
Source: Federal Election Commission

==== Results ====
Results by county: Spartz: 50–60%; 60–70%; King: 50–60%

Republican primary results
Party	Candidate	Votes	%
Republican	Victoria Spartz (incumbent)	33,695	59.9
Republican	Scott King	22,526	40.1
Total votes		56,221	100.0

=== Democratic primary ===
==== Nominee ====
- J. D. Ford, state senator for the 29th district (2018–present)

==== Eliminated in primary ====
- Steve Avit, healthcare professional
- Jackson Franklin, paramedic
- Phil Goss, educator and candidate for the 3rd district in 2024
- Dylan McKenna, technology salesman
- Tara Nelson, information technology professional and nominee for the 4th district in 2012
- Deborah Pickett, teacher and nominee for this district in 2024

==== Endorsements ====
J.D. Ford

State legislators

- Shelli Yoder, minority leader of the Indiana State Senate from district 40 (2020–present)

Labor Unions

- IAFF Local 1262
- SMART
- United Auto Workers Region 2B
Jackson Franklin

Organizations

- Track AIPAC

==== Fundraising ====
Campaign finance reports as of December 31, 2025
Candidate	Raised	Spent	Cash on hand
J. D. Ford (D)	$106,519	$105,060	$2,246
Jackson Franklin (D)	$32,737	$22,340	$10,397
Phil Goss (D)	$76,565	$77,212	$2,684
Deborah Pickett (D)	$8,925	$11,676	$1,517
Source: Federal Election Commission

==== Results ====
Results by county: Ford: 20–30%; 30–40%; 50–60%; Franklin: 20–30%; 30–40%

Democratic primary results
Party	Candidate	Votes	%
Democratic	J.D. Ford	17,608	42.5
Democratic	Jackson Franklin	7,023	17.0
Democratic	Deborah Pickett	5,840	14.1
Democratic	Tara Nelson	5,573	13.5
Democratic	Dylan McKenna	3,098	7.5
Democratic	Phil Goss	1,240	3.0
Democratic	Steven Avit	1,022	2.5
Total votes		41,404	100.0

=== General election ===
==== Predictions ====
Source	Ranking	As of
Decision Desk HQ	Likely R	July 14, 2026
The Cook Political Report	Lean R	October 30, 2026
Inside Elections	Likely R	October 15, 2026
Sabato's Crystal Ball	Likely R	October 20, 2026
Silver Bulletin	Likely R	August 20, 2026

==== Post-primary endorsements ====
J.D. Ford (D)

Labor unions

- Indiana State AFL-CIO
- National Education Association

==== Fundraising ====
Campaign finance reports as of October 14, 2026
Candidate	Raised	Spent	Cash on hand
Victoria Spartz (R)	$2,192,717	$1,935,845	$514,922
J.D. Ford (D)	$1,410,737	$1,086,209	$324,529
Source: Federal Election Commission

==== Polling ====
Poll source	Date(s) administered	Sample size (Note: Key: A – all adults RV – registered voters LV – likely voters V – unclear)	Margin of error	Victoria Spartz (R)	J.D. Ford (D)	Undecided
Quantus Insights (R)	October 21–22, 2026	601 (LV)	± 4.4%	45%	42%	13% (Note: "Someone else" with 2%; "Would not vote in this race" with 1%)
Quantus Insights (R)	October 21–22, 2026	601 (LV)	± 4.4%	47% (Note: With voters who lean towards a given candidate)	45%	8% (Note: "Someone else" with 2%; "Would not vote in this race" with 1%)
Expedition Strategies (D) (Note: Poll sponsored by House Majority PAC, which is focused on electing Democrats to the U.S. House of Representatives)	September 30 – October 4, 2026	600 (LV)	–	48%	47%	5%
Impact Research (D) (Note: Poll sponsored by Ford's campaign)	July 16–20, 2026	400 (LV)	± 4.9%	48%	46%	6%

==== Results ====
2026 Indiana's 5th congressional district election
Party	Candidate	Votes	%	±%
Democratic	J.D. Ford	134,476	51.7	
Republican	Victoria Spartz (incumbent)	125,851	48.3	
Total votes		260,327	100.0	

== District 6 ==
2026 Indiana's 6th congressional district election
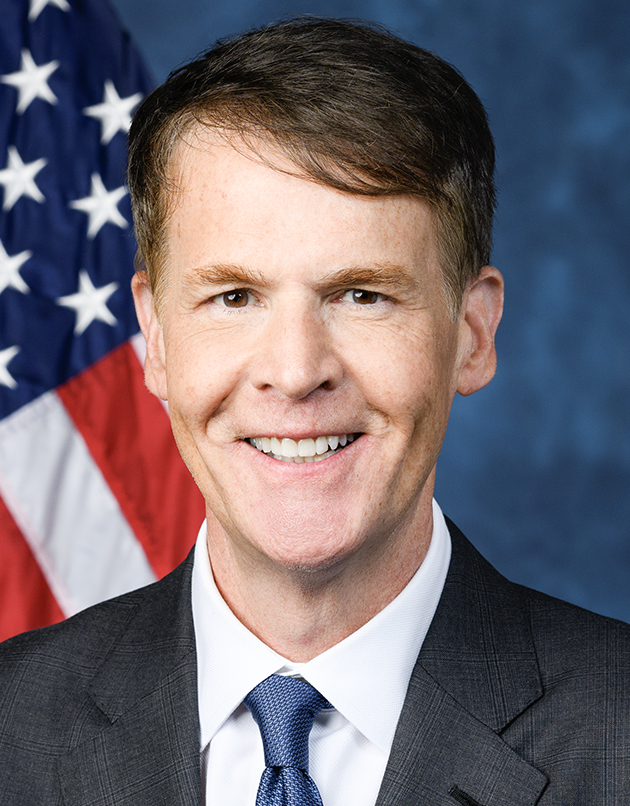

Nominee	Jefferson Shreve	Cynthia Wirth
Party	Republican	Democratic
Popular vote	111,116	90,576
Percentage	55.1%	44.9%
- Shreve: 50–60% 60–70% 70–80% 80–90% Wirth: 50–60% 60–70% 70–80% No votes
U.S. Representative before election
Jefferson Shreve
Republican
Elected U.S. Representative
Jefferson Shreve
Republican

The 6th district is located in eastern and central Indiana including Columbus and Richmond, some of Cincinnati's Indiana suburbs, most of Indianapolis' southern suburbs, and a sliver of Indianapolis itself. The incumbent is Republican Jefferson Shreve, who was elected with 63.9% of the vote in 2024. Shreve was re-elected.

=== Republican primary ===
==== Nominee ====
- Jefferson Shreve, incumbent U.S. representative

==== Eliminated in primary ====
- Sarah Janisse Brown, former Fortville town councilor

==== Endorsements ====
Jefferson Shreve

Executive branch officials

- Donald Trump, president of the United States (2017–2021, 2025–present)

Organizations

- AIPAC
- Indiana Farm Bureau AgELECT PAC
- NRA Political Victory Fund

==== Fundraising ====
Campaign finance reports as of December 31, 2025
Candidate	Raised	Spent	Cash on hand
Jefferson Shreve (R)	$2,296,135	$308,423	$2,119,426
Source: Federal Election Commission

==== Results ====
Results by county: Shreve: 50–60%

Republican primary results
Party	Candidate	Votes	%
Republican	Jefferson Shreve (incumbent)	27,814	53.1
Republican	Sarah Janisse Brown	24,559	46.9
Total votes		52,373	100.0

=== Democratic primary ===
==== Nominee ====
- Cinde Wirth, anthropologist and nominee for this district in 2022 and 2024

==== Eliminated in primary ====
- Kory Amyx, university counselor
- Nick Baker, attorney
- David Boyd, insurance adjuster

==== Results ====
Results by county: Wirth: 40–50%; 50–60%; 60–70%; 70–80%; Amyx: 40–50%

Democratic primary results
Party	Candidate	Votes	%
Democratic	Cinde Wirth	13,656	58.7
Democratic	Kory Amyx	3,659	15.7
Democratic	Nick Baker	3,131	13.5
Democratic	David Boyd	2,831	12.2
Total votes		23,277	100.0

=== General election ===
==== Predictions ====
Source	Ranking	As of
Decision Desk HQ	Safe R	July 14, 2026
The Cook Political Report	Safe R	February 6, 2025
Inside Elections	Safe R	March 7, 2025
Sabato's Crystal Ball	Safe R	July 15, 2025
Silver Bulletin	Solid R	August 20, 2026

==== Post-primary endorsements ====
Jefferson Shreve (R)

Organizations

- U.S. Chamber of Commerce
Cinde Wirth (D)

Labor unions

- Indiana State AFL-CIO

Organizations

- National Women's Political Caucus
- National Organization for Women

==== Fundraising ====
Campaign finance reports as of June 30, 2026
Candidate	Raised	Spent	Cash on hand
Jefferson Shreve (R)	$2,426,804	$950,284	$1,608,234
Cynthia Wirth (D)	$37,046	$30,400	$7,151
Source: Federal Election Commission

==== Results ====
2026 Indiana's 6th congressional district election
Party	Candidate	Votes	%	±%
Republican	Jefferson Shreve (incumbent)	111,116	55.1	
Democratic	Cynthia Wirth	90,576	44.9	
Total votes		201,692	100.0	

== District 7 ==
2026 Indiana's 7th congressional district election
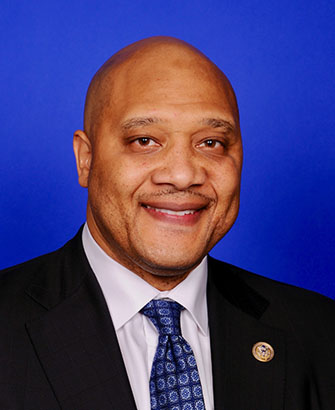

Nominee	André Carson	Patrick McAuley
Party	Democratic	Republican
Popular vote	159,211	42,208
Percentage	77.0%	20.4%
- Carson: 50–60% 60–70% 70–80% 80–90% >90% McAuley: 50–60% No votes
U.S. Representative before election
André Carson
Democratic
Elected U.S. Representative
André Carson
Democratic

The 7th district is entirely located within Marion County and includes most of Indianapolis, except for the southern side. The incumbent is Democrat André Carson, who was re-elected with 68.3% of the vote in 2024. Carson was re-elected here.

=== Democratic primary ===
==== Nominee ====
- André Carson, incumbent U.S. representative

==== Eliminated in primary ====
- Denise Paul Hatch, former Center Township constable
- George Hornedo, former member of the Indiana Democratic Party State Central Committee
- Destiny Wells, lawyer, nominee for Attorney General in 2024, and nominee for Secretary of State in 2022

==== Endorsements ====
André Carson

Organizations

- CAIR Action
- J Street
- Planned Parenthood Action Fund
- Track AIPAC

==== Fundraising ====
Campaign finance reports as of December 31, 2025
Candidate	Raised	Spent	Cash on hand
André Carson (D)	$641,825	$444,952	$646,296
George Hornedo (D)	$203,889	$177,368	$26,520
Source: Federal Election Commission

==== Results ====
Democratic primary results
Party	Candidate	Votes	%
Democratic	André Carson (incumbent)	44,849	62.4
Democratic	Destiny Wells	16,852	23.4
Democratic	George Hornedo	7,517	10.5
Democratic	Denise Paul Hatch	2,646	3.7
Total votes		71,864	100.0

=== Republican primary ===
==== Nominee ====
- Patrick McAuley, real estate associate

==== Eliminated in primary ====
- Felipe Rios, nominee for Indiana's 99th House district in 2024

==== Results ====
Republican primary results
Party	Candidate	Votes	%
Republican	Patrick McAuley	10,357	84.4
Republican	Felipe Rios	1,915	15.6
Total votes		12,272	100.0

=== Libertarian convention ===
==== Nominated ====
- James Sceniak, nominee for the 6th district in 2024

=== General election ===
==== Predictions ====
Source	Ranking	As of
Decision Desk HQ	Safe D	July 14, 2026
The Cook Political Report	Safe D	February 6, 2025
Inside Elections	Safe D	March 7, 2025
Sabato's Crystal Ball	Safe D	July 15, 2025
Silver Bulletin	Solid D	August 20, 2026

==== Post-primary endorsements ====
André Carson (D)

Labor unions

- Indiana State AFL-CIO
- National Education Association

==== Fundraising ====
Campaign finance reports as of June 30, 2026
Candidate	Raised	Spent	Cash on hand
André Carson (D)	$1,006,176	$834,249	$621,350
Patrick McAuley (R)	$0	$0	$0
James Sceniak (L)	$0	$0	$0
Source: Federal Election Commission

==== Results ====
2026 Indiana's 7th congressional district election
Party	Candidate	Votes	%	±%
Democratic	André Carson (incumbent)	159,211	77.0	
Republican	Patrick McAuley	42,208	20.4	
Libertarian	James Sceniak	5,452	2.6	
Total votes		206,871	100.0	

== District 8 ==
2026 Indiana's 8th congressional district election
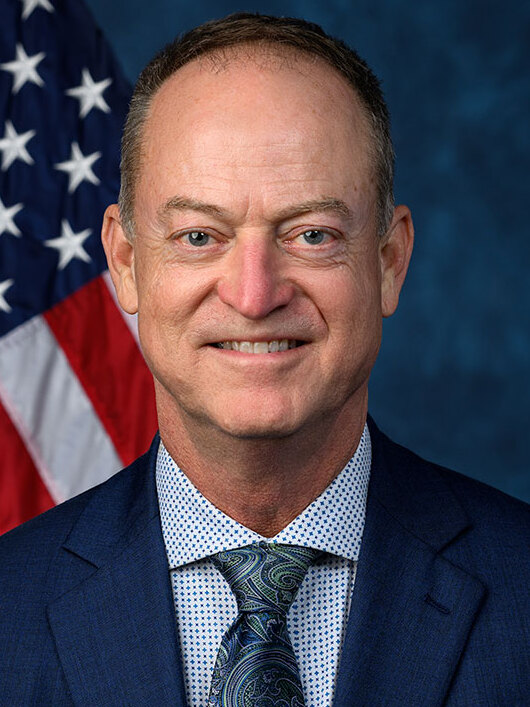

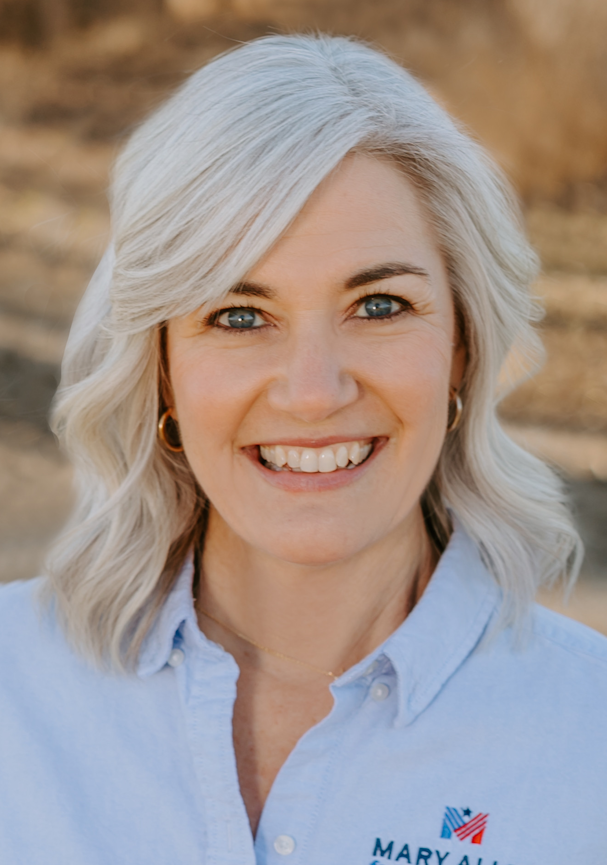
Nominee	Mark Messmer	Mary Allen
Party	Republican	Democratic
Popular vote	117,685	95,476
Percentage	55.2%	44.8%
- Messmer: 50–60% 60–70% 70–80% 80–90% Allen: 50–60% 60–70% 70–80% 80–90% >90% Tie: 50% No votes
U.S. Representative before election
Mark Messmer
Republican
Elected U.S. Representative
Mark Messmer
Republican

The 8th district is located in southwest and west central Indiana, the district is anchored in Evansville and also includes Jasper, Princeton, Terre Haute, Vincennes and Washington. The incumbent is Republican Mark Messmer, who was elected with 68.0% of the vote in 2024. Messmer was re-elected here.

=== Republican primary ===
==== Nominee ====
- Mark Messmer, incumbent U.S. representative

==== Endorsements ====
Mark Messmer

U.S. Executive Branch officials

- Donald Trump, 45th and 47th president of the United States (2017–2021, 2025–present)

Organizations

- AIPAC

==== Fundraising ====
Campaign finance reports as of December 31, 2025
Candidate	Raised	Spent	Cash on hand
Mark Messmer (R)	$701,391	$364,487	$544,009
Source: Federal Election Commission

==== Results ====
Republican primary results
Party	Candidate	Votes	%
Republican	Mark Messmer (incumbent)	52,249	100.0
Total votes		52,249	100.0

=== Democratic primary ===
==== Nominee ====
- Mary Allen, at-large Evansville city councilor (2023–present)

==== Eliminated in primary ====
- Mario Foradori, substitute teacher
- Christopher Rector, retired army veteran
- Tabitha Zeigler, activist

==== Fundraising ====
Campaign finance reports as of December 31, 2025
Candidate	Raised	Spent	Cash on hand
Mary Allen (D)	$119,802	$36,931	$82,871
Source: Federal Election Commission

==== Results ====
Results by county: Allen: 40–50%; 50–60%; 60–70%; 70–80%; 80–90%

Democratic primary results
Party	Candidate	Votes	%
Democratic	Mary Allen	18,816	66.7
Democratic	Tabitha Zeigler	4,308	15.3
Democratic	Christopher Rector	3,321	11.8
Democratic	Mario Foradori	1,758	6.2
Total votes		28,203	100.0

=== General election ===
==== Predictions ====
Source	Ranking	As of
Decision Desk HQ	Safe R	July 14, 2026
The Cook Political Report	Safe R	February 6, 2025
Inside Elections	Safe R	March 7, 2025
Sabato's Crystal Ball	Safe R	July 15, 2025
Silver Bulletin	Solid R	August 20, 2026

==== Fundraising ====
Campaign finance reports as of June 30, 2026
Candidate	Raised	Spent	Cash on hand
Mark Messmer (R)	$1,171,366	$664,971	$713,500
Mary Allen (D)	$294,502	$115,194	$179,307
Source: Federal Election Commission

==== Results ====
2026 Indiana's 8th congressional district election
Party	Candidate	Votes	%	±%
Republican	Mark Messmer (incumbent)	117,667	55.2	
Democratic	Mary Allen	95,317	44.8%	
Total votes		212,984	100.0	

== District 9 ==
2026 Indiana's 9th congressional district election
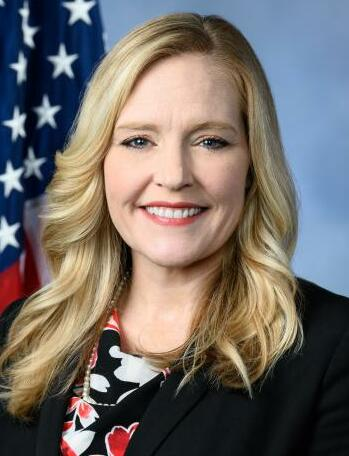

Nominee	Erin Houchin	Brad Meyer
Party	Republican	Democratic
Popular vote	122,326	98,480
Percentage	54.0%	43.5%
- Houchin: 40–50% 50–60% 60–70% 70–80% 80–90% Meyer: 40–50% 50–60% 60–70% 70–80% 80–90% >90% Tie: 40–50% 50% No votes
U.S. Representative before election
Erin Houchin
Republican
Elected U.S. Representative
Erin Houchin
Republican

The 9th district is located in south-central and southeastern Indiana, the district stretches from the south suburbs of Indianapolis to the Indiana side of the Louisville metropolitan area. The incumbent is Republican Erin Houchin, who was re-elected with 64.5% of the vote in 2024. Houchin was re-elected.

=== Republican primary ===
==== Nominee ====
- Erin Houchin, incumbent U.S. representative

==== Endorsements ====
Erin Houchin

Executive branch officials

- Donald Trump, president of the United States (2017–2021, 2025–present)

U.S. representatives

- August Pfluger, TX-11 (2021–present)

Organizations

- AIPAC
- Maggie's List

==== Fundraising ====
Campaign finance reports as of December 31, 2025
Candidate	Raised	Spent	Cash on hand
Erin Houchin (R)	$1,084,190	$681,892	$1,144,341
Source: Federal Election Commission

==== Results ====
Republican primary results
Party	Candidate	Votes	%
Republican	Erin Houchin (incumbent)	51,165	100.0
Total votes		51,165	100.0

=== Democratic primary ===
==== Nominee ====
- Brad Meyer, retired civil engineer

==== Eliminated in primary ====
- Jim Graham, retired college professor
- Tim Peck, doctor and nominee for this district in 2024
- Keil Roark, electrical engineer and nominee for Indiana's 72nd House district in 2022

==== Fundraising ====
Campaign finance reports as of December 31, 2025
Candidate	Raised	Spent	Cash on hand
Jim Graham (D)	$122,547	$117,665	$4,881
Brad Meyer (D)	$39,823	$27,344	$8,835
Tim Peck (D)	$106,519	$105,060	$2,246
Source: Federal Election Commission

==== Results ====
Results by county: Meyer: 20–30%; 30–40%; 40–50%; 50–60%; Peck: 40–50%; Graham: 30–40%

Democratic primary results
Party	Candidate	Votes	%
Democratic	Brad Meyer	12,788	37.9
Democratic	Tim Peck	11,181	33.1
Democratic	James Graham	5,833	17.3
Democratic	Keil Roark	3,935	11.7
Total votes		33,737	100.0

=== Libertarian primary ===
==== Declared ====
- Tonya Hudson, realtor and former vice-chair of the Libertarian Party of Indiana

=== Independent ===
==== Declared ====
- Floyd Taylor, cybersecurity professional

==== Fundraising ====
Campaign finance reports as of December 31, 2025
Candidate	Raised	Spent	Cash on hand
Floyd Taylor (I)	$0	$7,921	$0
Source: Federal Election Commission

=== General election ===
==== Predictions ====
Source	Ranking	As of
Decision Desk HQ	Safe R	July 14, 2026
The Cook Political Report	Safe R	February 6, 2025
Inside Elections	Safe R	March 7, 2025
Sabato's Crystal Ball	Safe R	July 15, 2025
Silver Bulletin	Solid R	August 20, 2026

==== Post-primary endorsements ====
Erin Houchin (R)

Organizations

- U.S. Chamber of Commerce

==== Post-primary endorsements ====
Brad Meyer (D)

Labor unions

- Indiana State AFL-CIO

==== Debates ====
2026 United States House of Representatives elections in Indiana 9th congressional district healthcare debate
No.	Date	Host	Moderator	Link	Participants									
Key: P Participant A Absent N Non-invitee I Invitee W Withdrawn														
Key: P Participant A Absent N Non-invitee I Invitee W Withdrawn					Houchin	Davidson	Graham	McCartney	Meyer	Peck	Roark	Voyles	Hudson	Taylor
1	November 8, 2025	Franklin & Ripley County Democratic Parties	Rachael Chatham	Video	A	P	A	W	P	P	N	N	N	P

==== Fundraising ====
Campaign finance reports as of June 30, 2026
Candidate	Raised	Spent	Cash on hand
Erin Houchin (R)	$1,856,572	$1,415,550	$1,183,065
Brad Meyer (D)	$105,510	$81,900	$17,840
Tonya Hudson (L)	$0	$0	$0
Floyd Taylor (I)	$0	$9,586	$-1,664
Source: Federal Election Commission

==== Results ====
2026 Indiana's 9th congressional district election
Party	Candidate	Votes	%	±%
Republican	Erin Houchin (incumbent)	122,326	54.0	
Democratic	Brad Meyer	98,480	43.5	
Libertarian	Tonya Hudson	5,530	2.4	
Independent	Floyd Taylor			
Total votes				

== Notes ==
Partisan clients
