= Ryan Elijah =

American politician, news anchor (born 1971)

Member-elect of the U.S. House of Representatives from Florida's 7th district
- Assuming office January 3, 2027
- Succeeding: Cory Mills

Personal details
- Born: November 8, 1971 (age 55)
- Party: Republican
- Education: Liberty University (attended); Anderson University (BA)
- Website: Campaign website

Terry Ryan Elijah (born November 8, 1971) is an American politician and former news anchor. A member of the Republican Party, he is a member-elect of the U.S. House of Representatives from Florida's 7th congressional district.

== Early life and education ==
Elijah was born November 8, 1971. He grew up in Fort Wayne, Indiana and attended Blackhawk Christian School. While a high school senior, he worked for the congressional campaign of Republican Rick Hawks.

Elijah attended Liberty University before earning a bachelor's in mass communications and political science from Anderson University in Indiana. He competed in baseball and golf at Anderson.

== News career ==
After college, Elijah began working in the news field in Jacksonville, Florida. In Jacksonville, he served as a sports director at CBS and worked with the Jacksonville Jaguars of the National Football League (NFL). He served as a sideline reporter for the Jaguars radio network and co-hosted a team television program, while also spending time as an NFL sideline reporter for Fox.

He later served as the anchor of Orlando Matters and won an Emmy for his hosting.

== Political career ==
Elijah previously ran for the Republican nomination in the 2010 Indiana's 3rd congressional district special election, losing to state Senator Marlin Stutzman in the second round of the party caucus.

=== 2026 U.S. House campaign ===
In April 2026, Elijah launched his campaign for the United States House of Representatives for Florida's 7th congressional district as a Republican, challenging incumbent Cory Mills. Mills was accused of sexual misconduct and had been under investigation by the House Ethics Committee over allegations of domestic violence and campaign finance violations. Elijah earned the support of several elected Florida Republicans over Mills, including Representatives Mike Haridopolos and Anna Paulina Luna. Elijah won the primary 47–34 over Mills and faced Democratic nominee Bale Dalton in the general election. In the general election, Elijah won by a margin of 0.5% against Dalton.

=== Campaign finance investigation ===
Following a formal complaint to the House Ethics Committee in September 2026, Elijah is under investigation for omitting up to $5 million in assets from his own financial disclosures as a candidate.

== Electoral history ==
2026 Florida 7th congressional district election (Republican primary)
| Party | Candidate | Votes | % |
|---|---|---|---|
| Republican | Ryan Elijah | 31,558 | 47.3 |
| Republican | Cory Mills (incumbent) | 22,753 | 34.1 |
| Republican | Sarah Ulrich | 7,010 | 10.5 |
| Republican | Mike Johnson | 5,411 | 8.1 |
| Total votes | | 66,732 | 100.0 |

Florida's 7th congressional district election, 2026
| Party | Candidate | Votes | % |
|---|---|---|---|
| Republican | Ryan Elijah | 161,303 | 49.71 |
| Democratic | Bale Dalton | 159,689 | 49.21 |
| Libertarian | Christopher Dennison | 3,486 | 1.07 |
| Total votes | | 324,478 | 100.00 |
| Republican hold | | | |

U.S. House of Representatives
| Preceded by Cory Mills | Member of the U.S. House of Representatives from Florida's 7th congressional district Taking office 2027 | Elect |
