= 2010 Indiana's 3rd congressional district special election =

2010 Indiana's 3rd congressional district election
- November 2, 2010
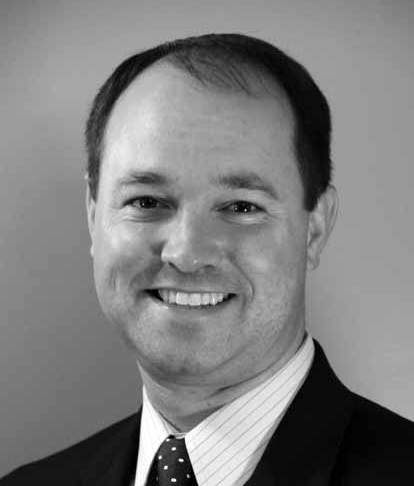

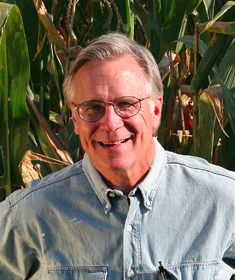
Nominee	Marlin Stutzman	Tom Hayhurst
Party	Republican	Democratic
Popular vote	115,415	60,880
Percentage	63%	33%
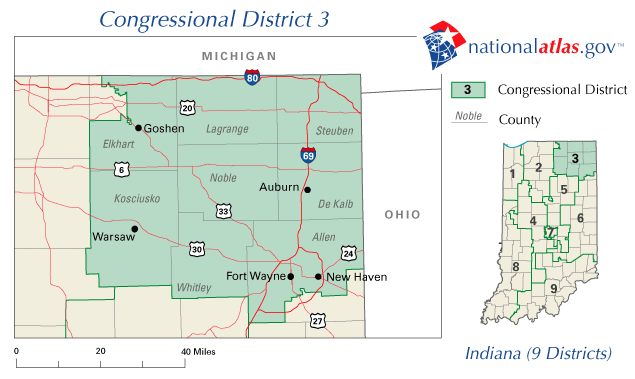
- Indiana's 3rd congressional district at the time of the 2010 elections.
Representative before election
Mark Souder
Republican
Elected Representative
Marlin Stutzman
Republican

The 2010 United States House of Representatives special election for Indiana's Third congressional district occurred on November 2, 2010, to elect the successor to Mark Souder (R) who resigned upon admitting to an extramarital affair. This election coincided with the regularly scheduled election.

== Background ==
Two weeks after winning renomination, Souder resigned both from office as U.S. Representative and as the Republican nominee for the Third district following the revelation of an affair with Tracy Meadows Jackson, a married female staffer. Governor Mitch Daniels (R), in the interest of cutting the costs of holding the election, scheduled the special election to succeed him to occur on the same day as the general election.

== Nominating caucuses ==
As per Indiana state law, the parties held caucuses within thirty days following Souder's resignation to choose their nominees for the special election.

=== Republican ===
Republicans held their caucus on June 12. State Senator Marlin Stutzman, the runner-up in the Republican U.S. Senatorial primary, won the nomination decisively in the second round over state Representative Randy Borror, car salesman Bob Thomas, Fort Wayne City Councilwoman Liz Brown, and Ryan Elijah.

Republican caucus results (round 1)
Party	Candidate	Votes	%
Republican	Marlin Stutzman	180	44.34
Republican	Randy Borror	67	16.5
Republican	Liz Brown	46	11.33
Republican	Ryan Elijah	43	10.59
Republican	Bob Thomas	21	5.17
Republican	Robert Morris	16	3.94
Republican	Wes Culver	11	2.71
Republican	Dennis Wright	11	2.71
Republican	Mike Foster	5	1.23
Republican	Joseph Schomburg	4	.99
Republican	Rachel Grubb	1	.25
Republican	Lonnie Powell	1	.25
Republican	Greg Dickman	0	0
Republican	Richard Thonert	0	0
Republican	Scott Welsh	0	0
Total votes		406	100

Republican caucus results (round 2)
Party	Candidate	Votes	%
Republican	Marlin Stutzman	229	57.25
Republican	Randy Borror	69	17.25
Republican	Ryan Elijah	46	11.5
Republican	Liz Brown	39	9.75
Republican	Bob Thomas	17	4.25
Total votes		400	100

=== Democratic ===
Democrats choose former Fort Wayne city councilman Tom Hayhurst, who had won the Democratic primary for the general election earlier, as their nominee for the special election.

=== Libertarian ===
Tea Party activist and ex-Republican Scott W. Wise, also their nominee for the general election, was chosen as the Libertarian nominee for the special election.

== Polling ==
Poll source	Date(s) administered	Sample size	Margin of error	Marlin Stutzman (R)	Tom Hayhurst (D)	Scott Wise (L)	Undecided
American Viewpoint	July 19–20, 2010	400	±4.9%	56%	29%	2%	n/a
SurveyUSA	October 21–25, 2010	400	±4.9%	57%	32%	7%	2%
Riggs Research	October 27–28, 2010	400	±4.9%	36%	40%	3%	n/a

== Results ==
Given the district's strong conservative bent, which at the time had a Cook Partisan Voting Index of R+14, Stutzman, as predicted by many political prognosticators, handily won the simultaneous special and general elections in November.

2010 US House special election: Indiana 3
Party	Candidate	Votes	%	±%
Republican	Marlin Stutzman	115,415	62.65%	+7.61%
Democratic	Tom Hayhurst	60,880	33.05%	−6.65%
Libertarian	Scott W. Wise	7,914	4.30%	−0.96%
Total votes		184,209	100.00%	
Majority		54,535	29.60%	

=== By county ===
County	Marlin Stutzman Republican		Tom Hayhurst Democratic		Scott Wise Libertarian		Margin		Total
County	Votes	%	Votes	%	Votes	%	Votes	%	Total
Allen	49,971	57.40%	33,664	38.67%	3,415	3.92%	16,307	18.73%	87,050
DeKalb	7,199	62.56%	3,732	32.43%	576	5.01%	3,467	30.13%	11,507
Elkhart	19,212	70.68%	7,171	26.38%	797	2.93%	12,041	44.30%	27,180
Kosciusko	14,731	74.11%	4,223	21.24%	924	4.65%	10,508	52.86%	19,878
LaGrange	4,538	69.36%	1,688	25.80%	317	4.84%	2,850	43.56%	6,543
Noble	7,211	64.23%	3,474	30.81%	592	5.25%	3,737	33.14%	11,277
Steuben	6,017	59.56%	3,537	35.01%	549	5.43%	3,480	34.45%	10,103
Whitley	6,536	61.25%	3,391	31.78%	744	6.97%	3,145	29.47%	10,671
