= 2022 Indiana's 2nd congressional district special election =

- November 8, 2022

Indiana's 2nd congressional district
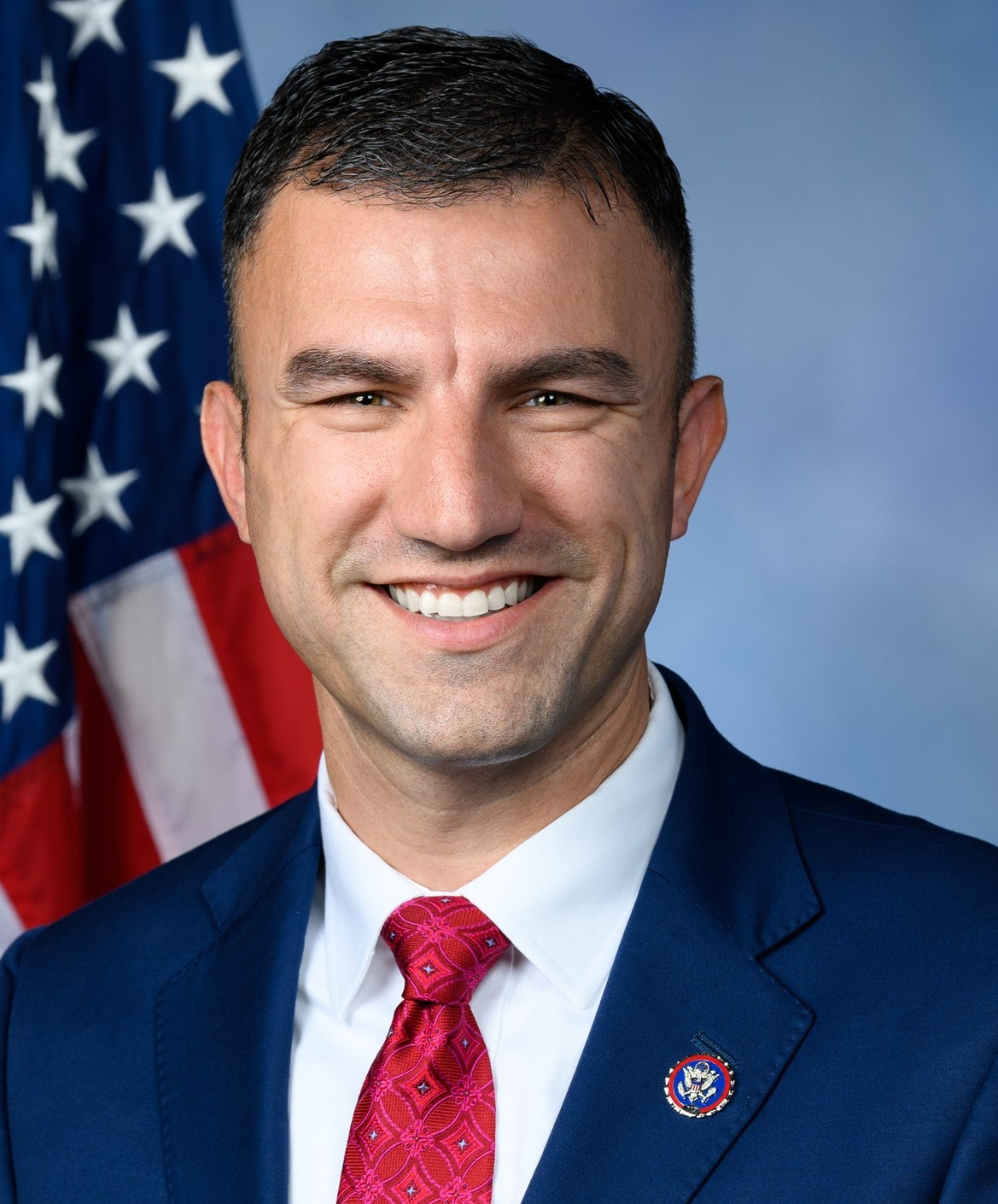

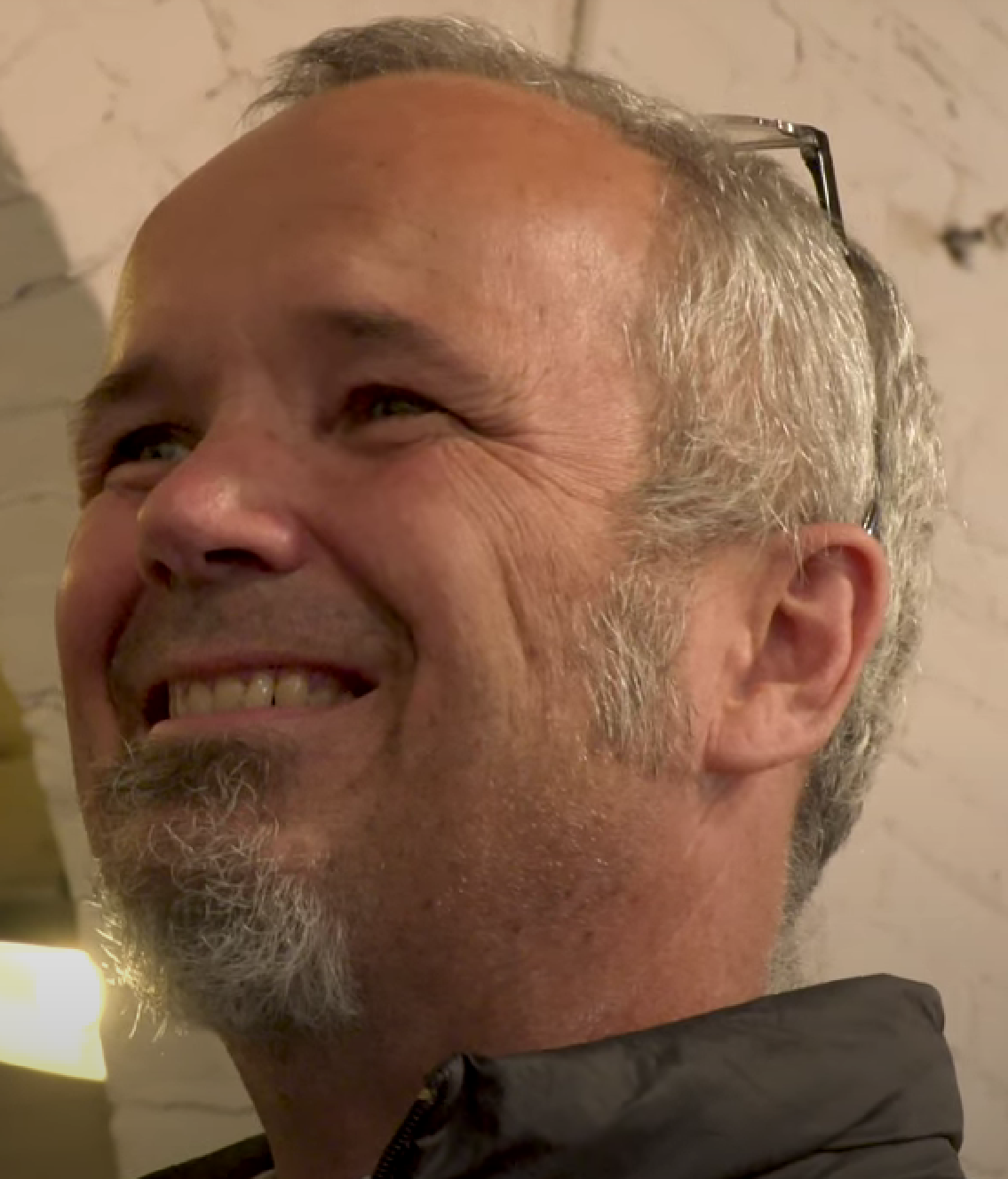
Nominee	Rudy Yakym	Paul Steury
Party	Republican	Democratic
Popular vote	118,997	62,792
Percentage	63.3%	33.4%
- County results Yakym: 50–60% 60–70% 70–80%
U.S. Representative before election
Jackie Walorski
Republican
Elected U.S. Representative
Rudy Yakym
Republican

The 2022 Indiana's 2nd congressional district special election was a special election to choose a new member of the U.S. House of Representatives. The seat became vacant after incumbent Congresswoman Jackie Walorski died in a traffic collision on August 3, 2022.

In accordance with Title 3, Article 10, of the Indiana Code, a special election must be held for any U.S. House vacancy that occurs more than 74 days before the next general election. On August 9, Governor Eric Holcomb announced the special election was to be held concurrently with the general election on November 8. Parties held caucuses to nominate their candidates for the election; they had until August 26 to do so.

Since the congressional district boundaries set in the 2020 redistricting cycle went into effect on January 3, 2023, the special election was conducted under the old district lines whereas the regular election on the same date was conducted under the new district lines.

== Republican caucus ==
The Indiana Republican Party held its nominating caucus in Mishawaka on August 20. Out of approximately 500 precinct committee members who were eligible to vote, about 375 were present at the caucus. The number of votes received by each candidate was not made public; Indiana Republican Party chair Kyle Hupfer said in a statement that Rudy Yakym received a majority of votes in the first round of balloting and was thus selected to replace Walorski as the Republican nominee in the 2022 regular election. Subsequently, Yakym also won the nomination for the special election by voice vote.

=== Candidates ===
==== Nominee ====
- Rudy Yakym, supply chain management executive and former finance director for Jackie Walorski

==== Eliminated at convention ====
- Dallas Barkman
- Terry Harper III
- Curtis Hill, former attorney general of Indiana
- Michael Hogberg, enrolled agent and tax preparer
- Scott Alan Huffman
- Tiernan Kane, attorney
- Daniel Koors
- Marvin Joe Layne
- Curt Nisly, state representative from the 22nd district
- Christy Stutzman, former state representative from the 49th district and wife of former U.S. Representative Marlin Stutzman
- Scott Wise

==== Did not file ====
- Mick Hoeflinger
- Michael Nidiffer

==== Declined ====
- Dean Swihart, Jackie Walorski's widower (endorsed Yakym)

=== Endorsements ===
Rudy Yakym

Individuals

- Dean Swihart, Jackie Walorski's widower

=== Results ===
Republican caucus results
Party	Candidate	Votes	%
Republican	Rudy Yakym	205	56.79
Republican	Curtis Hill	86	23.82
Republican	Curt Nisly	31	8.59
Republican	Christy Stutzman	27	7.48
Republican	Marvin Layne	12	3.32
Republican	Others	0	0.00
Total votes		361	100.00

== Democratic caucus ==
The Indiana Democratic Party held its nominating caucus in Lakeville on August 23.

=== Candidates ===
==== Nominee ====
- Paul Steury, environmental consultant and nominee for this district in the 2022 regular election

== Libertarian caucus ==
=== Candidates ===
==== Nominee ====
- William Henry, communications consultant, nominee for lieutenant governor in 2020, and nominee for this district in the 2022 regular election

== General election ==
=== Results ===
2022 Indiana's 2nd congressional district special election
Party	Candidate	Votes	%	±%
Republican	Rudy Yakym	118,997	63.3	+1.86
Democratic	Paul Steury	62,792	33.4	−5.11
Libertarian	William Henry	6,101	3.2	N/A
Write-in	Marla Godette	143	0.1	N/A
Total votes		188,033	100.00	

By county

County	Rudy Yakym Republican		Paul Steury Democratic		William Henry Libertarian		Marla Godette Write-in		Margin		Total votes
County	#	%	#	%	#	%	#	%	#	%	Total votes
Elkhart	30,859	68.9%	12,845	28.7%	1,065	2.4%	15	0.0%	18,014	40.2%	44,784
Fulton	4,177	75.6%	1,174	21.2%	175	3.2%	1	0.0%	3,003	54.3%	5,527
Kosciusko (part)	6,646	76.2%	1,284	14.7%	792	9.1%	0	0.0%	5,362	61.5%	8,722
LaPorte (part)	9,555	60.1%	5,682	35.8%	654	4.1%	0	0.0%	3,873	24.4%	15,891
Marshall	9,383	73.7%	2,976	23.4%	370	2.9%	1	0.0%	6,407	50.3%	12,730
Miami	6,385	75.7%	1,710	20.3%	337	4.0%	0	0.0%	4,675	55.4%	8,432
Pulaski	2,861	76.9%	740	19.9%	117	3.1%	0	0.0%	2,121	57.0%	3,718
St. Joseph	36,908	51.5%	32,638	45.6%	1,968	2.7%	123	0.2%	4,270	6.0%	71,637
Starke	4,895	71.8%	1,664	24.4%	251	3.7%	3	0.0%	3,231	47.4%	6,813
Wabash	7,328	74.9%	2,079	21.3%	372	3.8%	0	0.0%	5,249	53.7%	9,779
Totals	118,997	63.3%	62,792	33.4%	6,101	3.2%	143	0.1%	56,205	29.9%	188,033

== See also ==
- 2022 United States House of Representatives elections
- 2022 United States elections
- 117th United States Congress
- List of special elections to the United States House of Representatives
