= Frank Mrvan Jr. =

American politician (born 1933)

Frank Mrvan

Member of the Indiana Senate from the 1st district
- In office November 4, 1998 – January 11, 2022
- Preceded by: Sandy Dempsey
- Succeeded by: Michael Griffin
- In office November 8, 1978 – January 19, 1995
- Preceded by: William Christy
- Succeeded by: Sandy Dempsey

Personal details
- Born: Frank Ed Mrvan Jr. April 11, 1933 (age 93) East Chicago, Indiana, U.S.
- Party: Democratic
- Spouse: Jean
- Children: 2, including Frank J. Mrvan
- Education: Indiana University, Northwest

Military service
- Allegiance: United States
- Branch/service: United States Air Force
- Years of service: 1952–1956
- Battles/wars: Korean War

Frank Ed Mrvan Jr. (born April 11, 1933) is an American politician who served as a Democratic member of the Indiana Senate, representing the 1st District from 1979 to 1994 and again from 1998, until his retirement in 2022.

== Early life and education ==
Mrvan was born in East Chicago, Indiana in 1933, the son of the late Frank Edward and the late Antonina (née Spychalski) Mrvan. He is of Polish and Czechoslovak descent. Known as Frank Ed Mrvan Jr., he attended Washington High School in East Chicago. He attended Indiana University Northwest and the American Institute of Banking.

Mrvan enlisted in the United States Air Force, serving from 1952 to 1956. He served in the Korean War. He was an Airman 1st Class (E-3).

== Career ==
Mrvan worked in industry and banking. He worked for the Mobil Oil Company, where he was a union member. He became a Cost Accountant for M and T Chemical Company, and Bank Financial Officer for National City Indiana.

Mrvan entered politics, joining the Democratic Party, which became a force in the region by the 1930s. He was elected to the Indiana Senate in 1978, and, with repeated re-elections, served from 1979 through 1995.

Mrvan was elected again in 1998. Redistricting passed by the Indiana General Assembly in 2011 shifted the State Senate 1st district's boundaries, effective January 2013. The district was changed to include Hammond's 4th, 5th, 6th city districts, the town of Munster, the town of Highland, the west side of the town of Griffith, the north side of the town of Dyer, parts of the town of Schererville, and part of the City of Crown Point.

== Personal life ==
Mrvan married and had two children. His son, Frank J. Mrvan, also entered politics from Lake County. He was elected as a North Township trustee.

In 2019 the younger Frank Mrvan decided to run for the Democratic nomination in Indiana's 1st congressional district to succeed Pete Visclosky, who was retiring after a long tenure in office. Supported by Visclosky as his successor, Frank Mrvan won the Democratic nomination over 13 other candidates, and also defeated his Republican rival in the general election. He was sworn in on January 3, 2021.
