= Michael Griffin (Indiana politician) =

American politician

Member of the Indiana Senate from the 1st district
- In office February 7, 2022 – November 9, 2022
- Preceded by: Frank Ed Mrvan Jr.
- Succeeded by: Dan Dernulc

Personal details
- Party: Democratic
- Education: Indiana University Bloomington; Indiana University Northwest

Michael Griffin is an American politician. He served as a Democratic member for the 1st district of the Indiana Senate.

Griffin attended Indiana University Bloomington where he earned a Bachelor of Arts degree in political science. He then attended Indiana University Northwest, where he earned a Master of Public Administration degree. In 2022, Griffin was appointed for the 1st district of the Indiana Senate. He succeeded Frank Ed Mrvan Jr. Griffin assumed his office on February 7, 2022. In November 2022 he lost the general election to Dan Dernulc, a Lake County Council member.
