= Frank J. Mrvan =

American mortgage broker & politician (born 1969)

Frank Mrvan
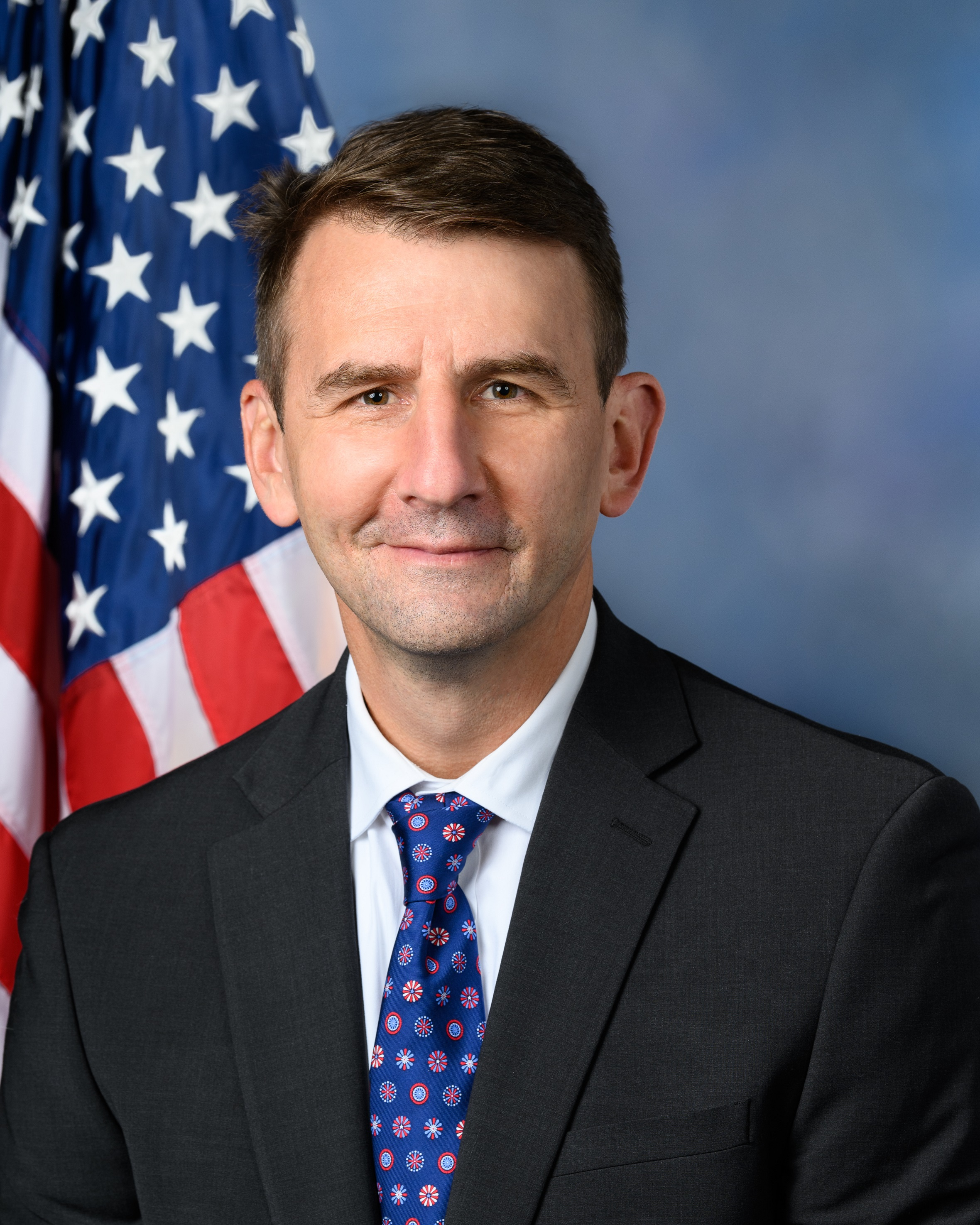
- Official portrait, 2020

Member of the U.S. House of Representatives from Indiana's 1st district
- Incumbent
- Assumed office January 3, 2021
- Preceded by: Pete Visclosky

Personal details
- Born: Frank John Mrvan; April 16, 1969 (age 57) Hammond, Indiana, U.S.
- Party: Democratic
- Spouse: Jane Trimble (m. 1996)
- Children: 2
- Relatives: Frank Mrvan (father)
- Education: Ball State University (BS)
- Website: House website Campaign website

Frank John Mrvan (/mərˈvæn/ mər-VAN; born April 16, 1969) is an American politician who has served as the U.S. representative for Indiana's 1st congressional district since 2021. From 2005 until 2021, he served as the township trustee for North Township, Indiana. Mrvan is a member of the Democratic Party.

== Early life and career ==
Mrvan, who is of Czechoslovak and Polish heritage, was born and raised in Hammond, Indiana. After graduating from Oliver P. Morton High School, he earned a bachelor's degree in journalism from Ball State University.

Mrvan worked as a licensed mortgage broker and pharmaceutical sales representative. In November 2005, he was appointed as the township trustee for North Township, Indiana, when his predecessor resigned.

== U.S. House of Representatives ==
=== Elections ===
==== 2020 ====
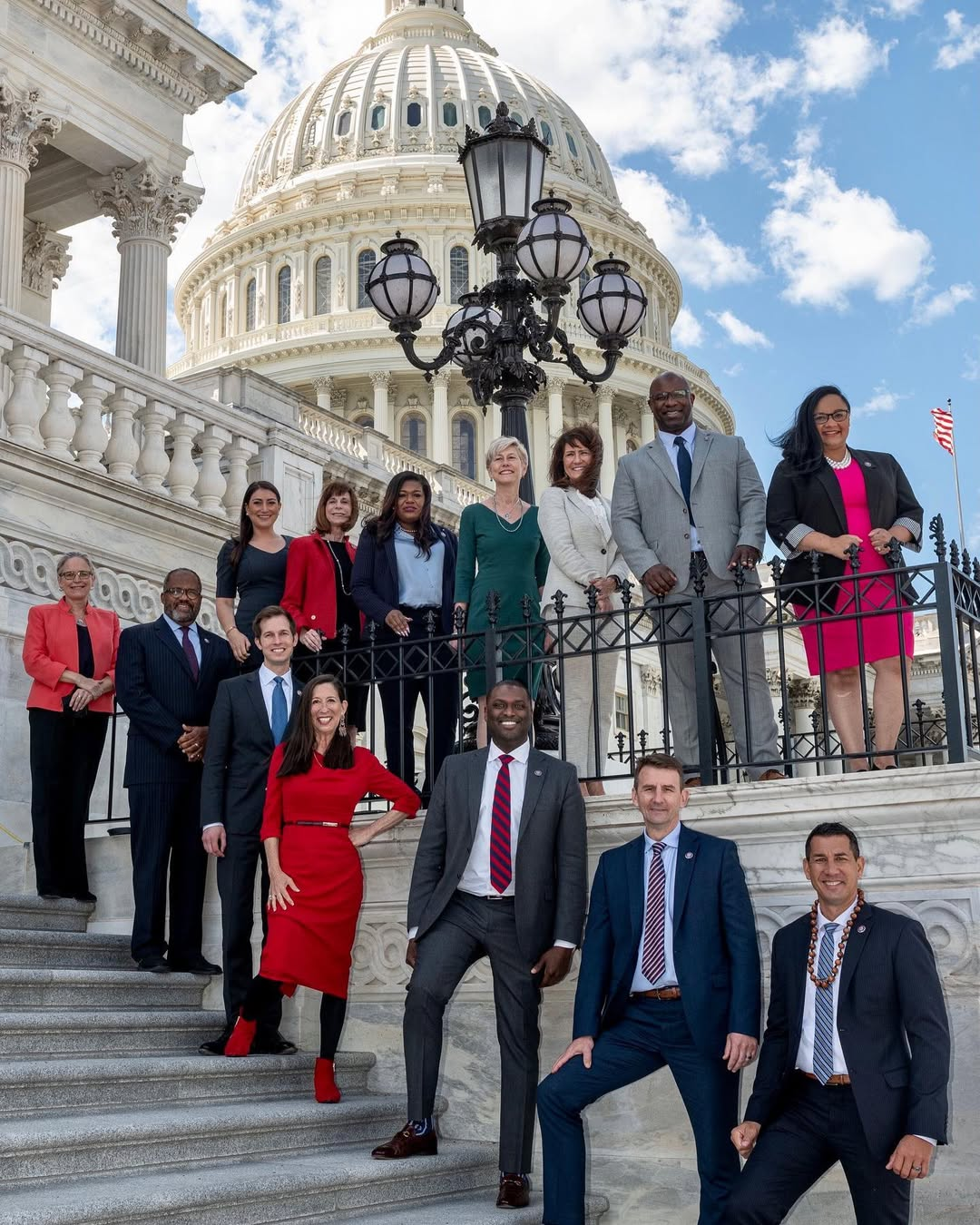
Mrvan and Democratic first-time members of the 117th Congress, 2021

After Pete Visclosky, the incumbent U.S. representative for Indiana's 1st congressional district, decided not to run for reelection in 2020, Mrvan announced his candidacy. He was endorsed by Visclosky and the local chapter of the United Steelworkers. Mrvan won the Democratic nomination with 33% of the vote in a field of 14 candidates, including Hammond Mayor Thomas McDermott Jr. and state Representative Mara Candelaria Reardon. He defeated Republican Mark Leyva in the November general election, 57% to 40%.

==== 2022 ====
Mrvan ran for reelection against Republican nominee Jennifer-Ruth Green. During the campaign, a research firm contracted by the Democratic Congressional Campaign Committee inappropriately obtained the military records of Green. This included her experience of having been sexually assaulted by an Iraqi serviceman. Green stated she was "saddened to have to share publicly one of the most private events of my life". On November 8, Mrvan defeated Green 53% to 47%.

==== 2024 ====
Mrvan was re-elected in 2024 against Republican nominee Randy Niemeyer 53% to 45%.

=== Tenure ===
Mrvan took office on January 3, 2021. He voted in favor of the second impeachment of Donald Trump, the American Rescue Plan Act of 2021, and the Protecting the Right to Organize Act, which he co-sponsored.

=== Committee assignments ===
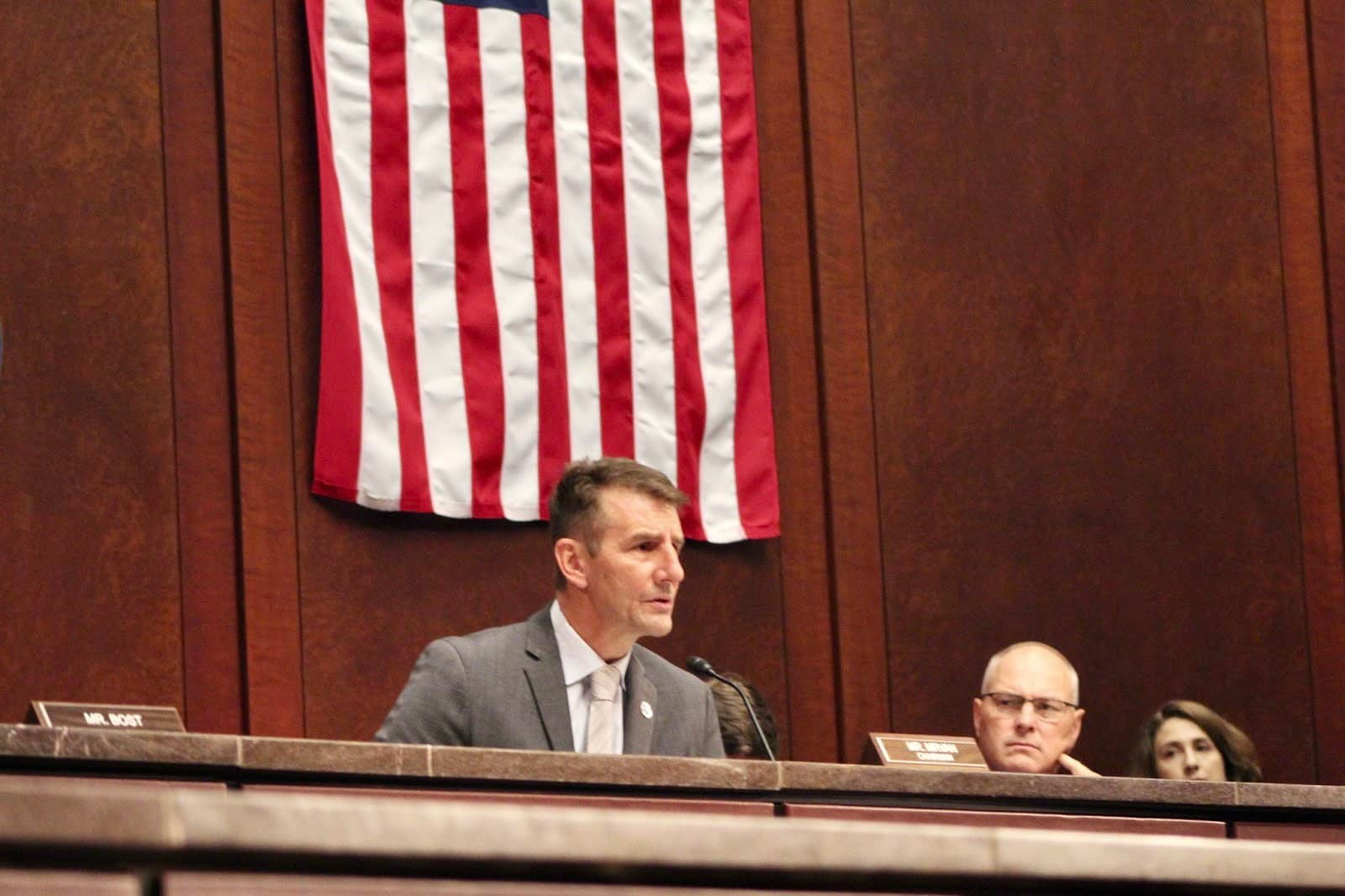
Mrvan chairing a hearing on the U.S. steel industry, 2022

For the 119th Congress:

- Committee on Appropriations
  - Subcommittee on Commerce, Justice, Science, and Related Agencies
  - Subcommittee on Energy and Water Development and Related Agencies

=== Caucuses ===
- Congressional Equality Caucus
- New Democrat Coalition
- Black Maternal Health Caucus
- Congressional Steel Caucus (co-chair)
- Labor Caucus
- Congressional Caucus for the Equal Rights Amendment

== Political positions ==
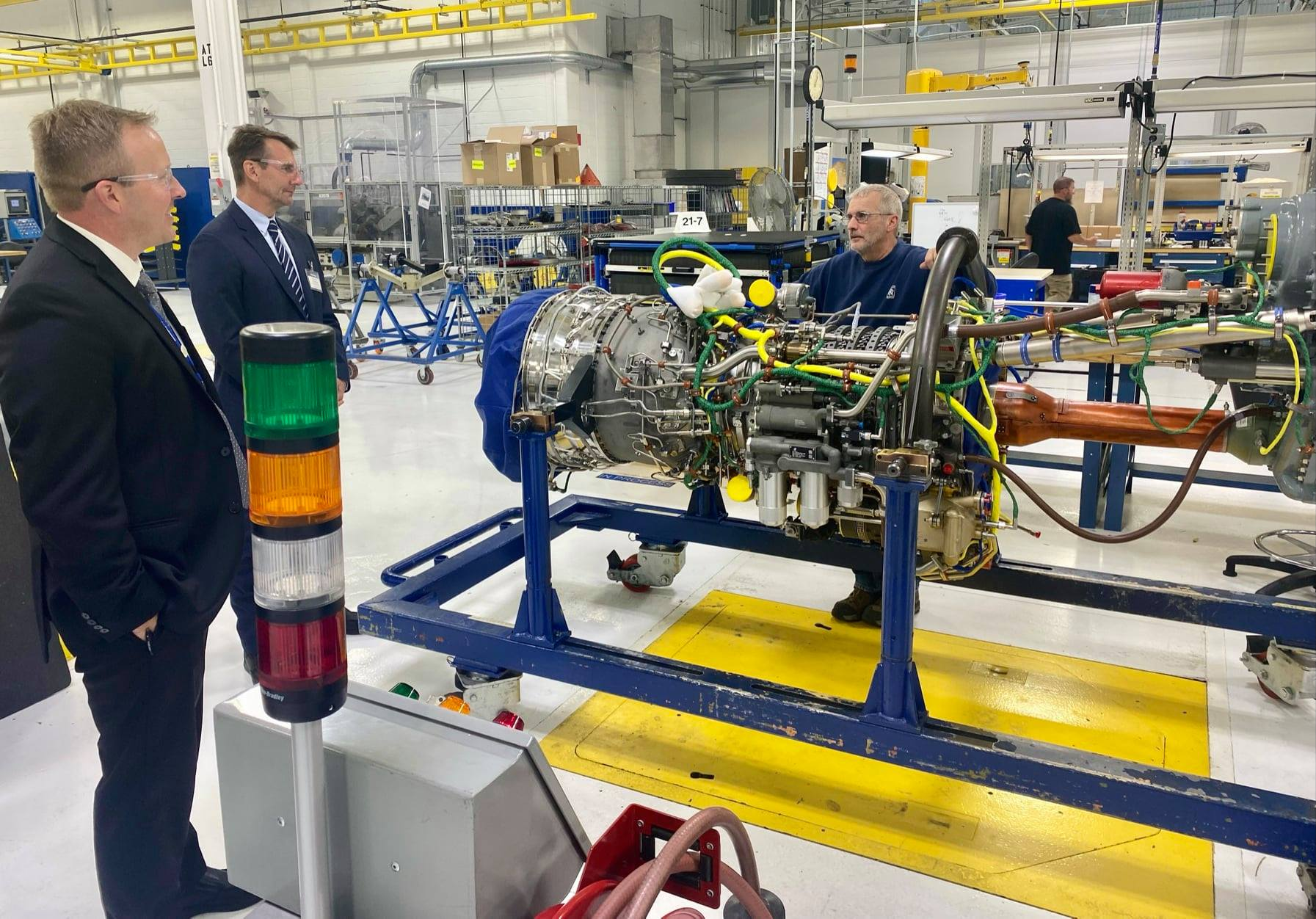
Mrvan visits the Rolls Royce airplane engine manufacturing facility in Indianapolis, 2021

=== Abortion ===
Mrvan supports abortion rights and supports codifying Roe v. Wade. He is an original cosponsor of the Women's Health Protection Act.

=== COVID-19 policy ===
On January 31, 2023, Mrvan voted against H.R.497:Freedom for Health Care Workers Act, a bill which would lift COVID-19 vaccine mandates for healthcare workers.

On February 1, 2023, Mrvan voted against a resolution to end the COVID-19 national emergency.

=== Healthcare ===
Mrvan voted in 2026 to extend the Affordable Care Act enhanced tax credits.

=== Immigration ===
On February 9, 2023, Mrvan voted against H.J.Res. 24: Disapproving the action of the District of Columbia Council in approving the Local Resident Voting Rights Amendment Act of 2022 which condemns the District of Columbia's plan that would allow non-citizens to vote in local elections.

=== Syria ===
In 2023, Mrvan voted against H.Con.Res. 21 which directed President Joe Biden to remove U.S. troops from Syria within 180 days.

== Personal life ==
Mrvan and his wife, Jane (née Trimble), have two children.

His father, Frank E. Mrvan, served in the Indiana state Senate from 1978 to 1995 and 1998 to 2022.

U.S. House of Representatives
Preceded by Pete Visclosky	Member of the U.S. House of Representatives from Indiana's 1st congressional district 2021–present	Incumbent
U.S. order of precedence (ceremonial)
Preceded by Blake Moore	United States representatives by seniority 268th	Succeeded by Troy Nehls
