= Christy Stutzman =

American politician

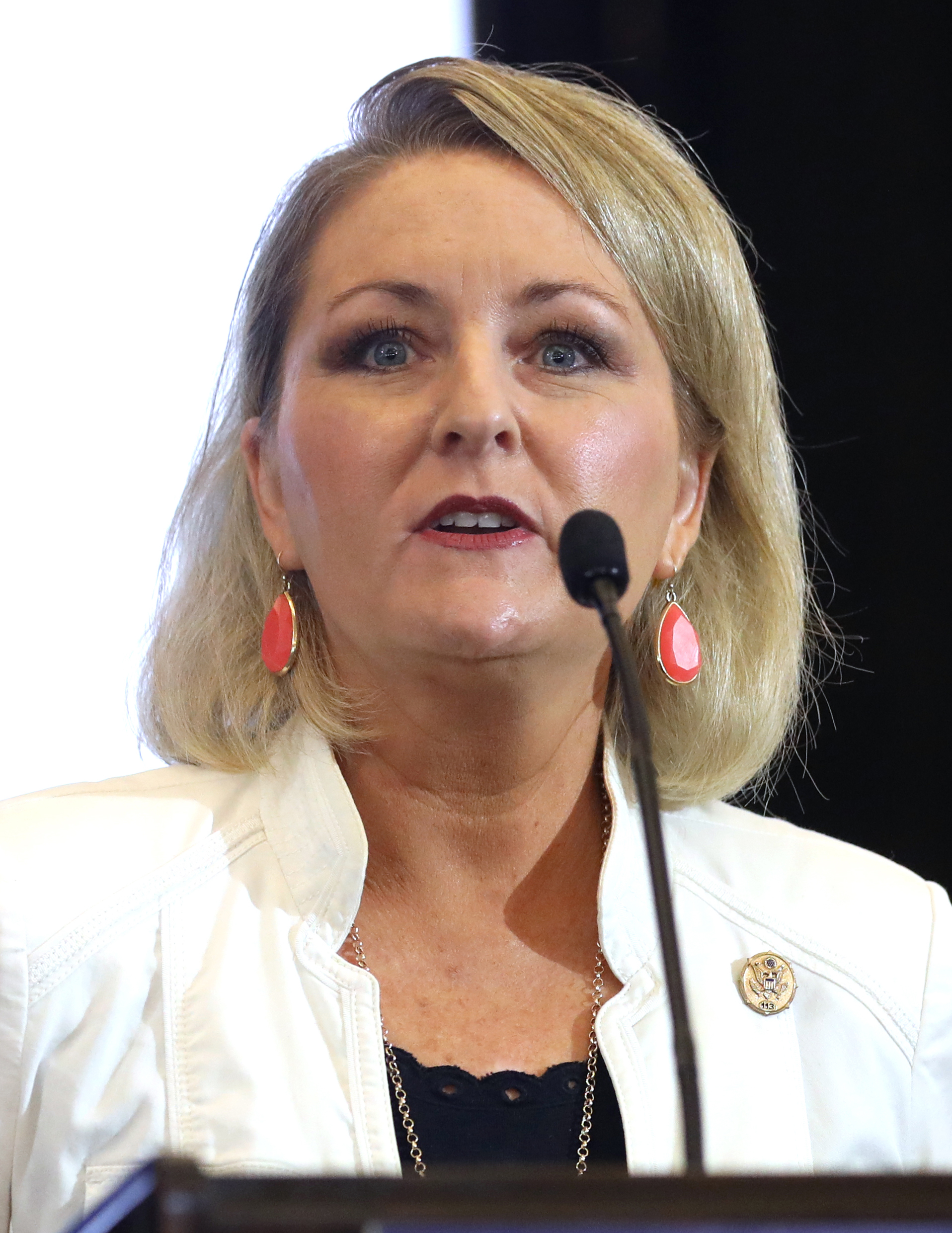

Member of the Indiana House of Representatives from the 49th district
- In office November 20, 2018 – December 14, 2020
- Preceded by: Wes Culver
- Succeeded by: Joanna King

Personal details
- Born: 1973 (age 52–53)
- Party: Republican
- Spouse: Marlin Stutzman
- Children: 2
- Education: Pensacola Christian College (BA)

Christy Stutzman (born 1973) is an American politician, businesswoman, and newspaper columnist. She is a former member of the Indiana House of Representatives.

== Education ==
Stutzman earned a bachelor's degree in music, voice, and opera at Pensacola Christian College in 1995.

== Career ==
Stutzman is a freelance columnist for several Indiana newspapers. She was elected to serve in the Indiana House of Representatives as a Republican in November 2018 and assumed office in January 2019. She was re-elected to the house in 2020. During her tenure, she served as vice chair of the House Public Policy Committee. In late-November 2020, she announced that she would have to step down from the state house seat to devote more time to managing the former Amish Acres tourist attraction that they renamed the Barns at Nappanee. She blamed COVID-19 restrictions ordered by Republican Governor Eric Holcomb for making business difficult to maintain.

Stutzman was a Republican candidate for the 2022 Indiana's 2nd congressional district special election.

== Personal life ==
She is married to Marlin Stutzman, who served in the United States House of Representatives and in the Indiana General Assembly; they co-own Stutzman Power Equipment Company and the Schonbrook Farm and Inn. Stutzman and her husband live with their family in Middlebury, Indiana.
