= Randy Borror =

American politician (born 1957)

Randy L. Borror

Member of the Indiana House of Representatives from the 84th district
- In office November 29, 2001 – July 8, 2010
- Preceded by: Gloria Goeglein
- Succeeded by: Robert D. Morris

Personal details
- Born: July 25, 1957 (age 69) Bluffton, Indiana
- Party: Republican
- Spouse: Kelly
- Education: Indiana University

Randy L. Borror (born 25 July 1957) is a former Republican member of the Indiana House of Representatives, representing the 84th District since 2001.

He grew up in Wells County, graduating from Bluffton High School before completing his bachelor's degree at Indiana University Bloomington.
