= Rudy Yakym =

American politician (born 1984)

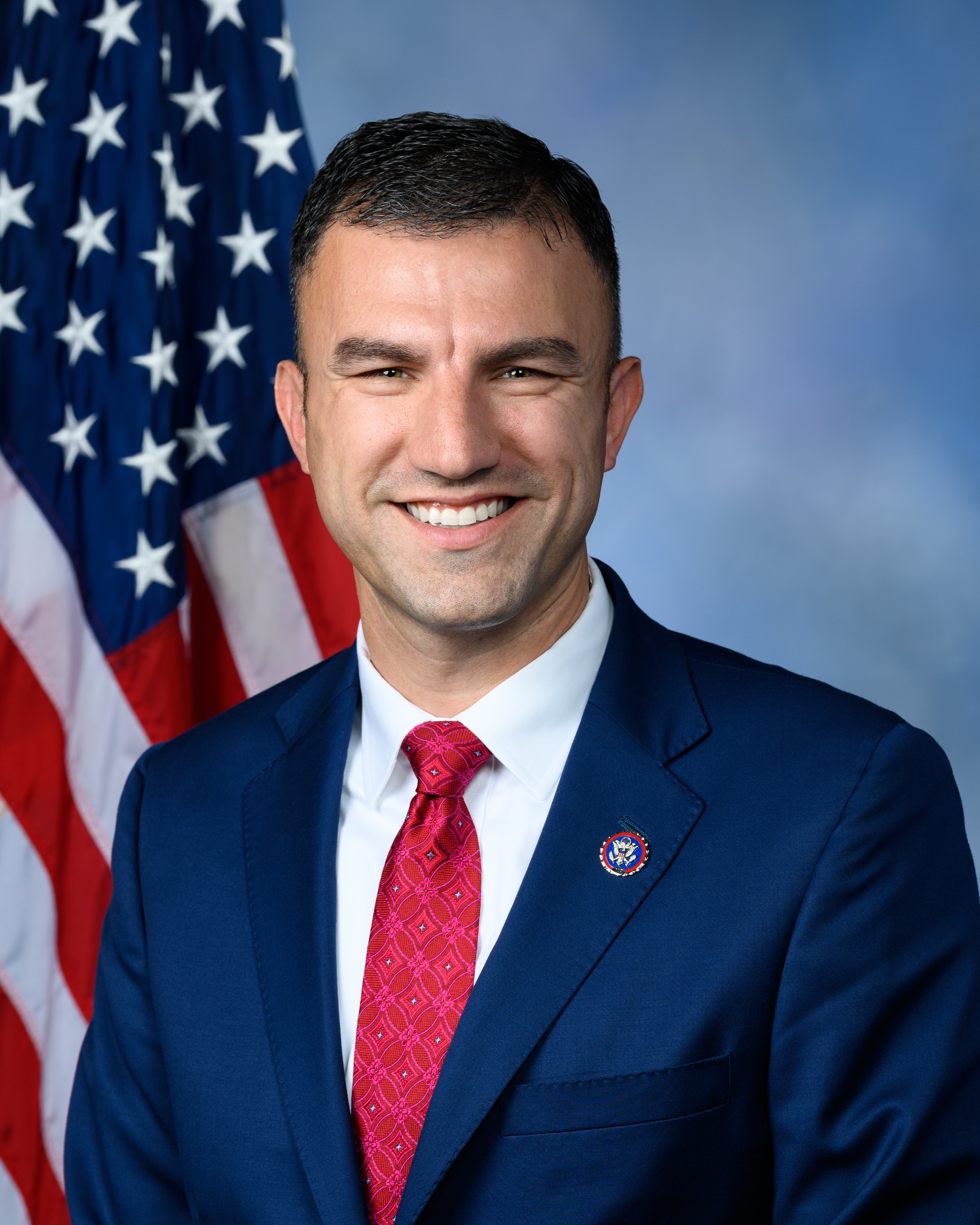
- Official portrait, 2022

Member of the U.S. House of Representatives from Indiana's 2nd district
- Incumbent
- Assumed office November 8, 2022 (Note: Yakym's official service begins on the date of the special election, while he was not sworn in until November 14, 2022.)
- Preceded by: Jackie Walorski

Personal details
- Born: Rudolph Chester Yakym III; February 24, 1984 (age 42) South Bend, Indiana, U.S.
- Party: Republican
- Spouse: Sallyann Freet (m. 2006)
- Children: 3
- Education: Indiana University, South Bend (AS, BS); University of Notre Dame (MBA)
- Website: House website Campaign website

Rudolph Chester Yakym III (/ˈjɑːkɪm/ YAH-kim; born February 24, 1984) is an American politician and businessman who is the member of the U.S. House of Representatives representing Indiana's 2nd congressional district. He is a member of the Republican Party.

== Early life and education ==
Yakym was born in South Bend, Indiana, on February 24, 1984. He earned an associate degree in business and a Bachelor of Science in finance and business administration from the Indiana University South Bend. In 2019, he earned a Master of Business Administration from the University of Notre Dame.

== Career ==
In 2010 and 2011, Yakym worked as a sales manager for Omnicity, a broadband company. In 2011 and 2012, he was the Finance Director for Jackie Walorski's congressional campaign. From 2013 to 2019, he was a vice president at the Bradley Company, a commercial real estate business. In 2015, then-Governor Mike Pence nominated Yakym to serve as a member of the Indiana Judicial Nominating Commission. Since 2019, Yakym has been the director of growth initiatives at Kem Krest, a logistics and supply chain organization.

== U.S. House of Representatives ==
=== Election ===
After congresswoman Jackie Walorski died in a car accident in August 2022, Yakym declared his candidacy in Indiana's 2nd congressional district special election to succeed her. He was selected as the Republican nominee by the district's GOP precinct committee members to serve both the remainder of Walorski's term and a full two-year term beginning in January 2023. Winning the nomination on the first ballot amid a field of 12 candidates, Yakym defeated contenders including former Indiana Attorney General Curtis Hill and state Representatives Curt Nisly and Christy Stutzman. He defeated the Democratic nominee, Goshen teacher Paul Steury, and Libertarian nominee William Henry in the general election with over 64% of the vote.

=== Positions ===
In a 2024 interview, Yakym stated that his most important issues were inflation and border security.

Also in 2024, Yakym sent a letter to 136 presidents of colleges regarding their positions on encampments protesting the Gaza war.

Yakym voted in 2026 against extending the Affordable Care Act enhanced tax credits.

=== Committee assignments ===
For the 119th Congress:

- Committee on Ways and Means
  - Subcommittee on Oversight
  - Subcommittee on Social Security
  - Subcommittee on Work and Welfare

== Personal life ==
Yakym married his wife, Sallyann Freet, in 2006. She is a teacher at Elkhart Christian Academy. They have three children. He is a practicing Baptist and serves as the head usher at the New Life Baptist Church in Osceola, Indiana.

== Electoral history ==
2022

2022 Indiana's 2nd congressional district special election
Party	Candidate	Votes	%	±%
Republican	Rudy Yakym	125,222	64.6	
Democratic	Paul Steury	62,726	32.4	
Libertarian	William Henry	5,782	3.0	
Total votes		193,730	100.0	

2024

2024 Indiana's 2nd congressional district election
Party	Candidate	Votes	%
Republican	Rudy Yakym (incumbent)	184,848	62.7
Democratic	Lori Camp	101,962	34.6
Libertarian	William Henry	7,795	2.6
Independent	Michael John Hubbard (Write in)	13	0.0
Total votes		294,618	100.0

U.S. House of Representatives
Preceded by Jackie Walorski	Member of the U.S. House of Representatives from Indiana's 2nd congressional district 2022–present	Incumbent
U.S. order of precedence (ceremonial)
Preceded by Pat Ryan	United States representatives by seniority 289th	Succeeded by Cleo Fields
