= Dan Dernulc =

American politician

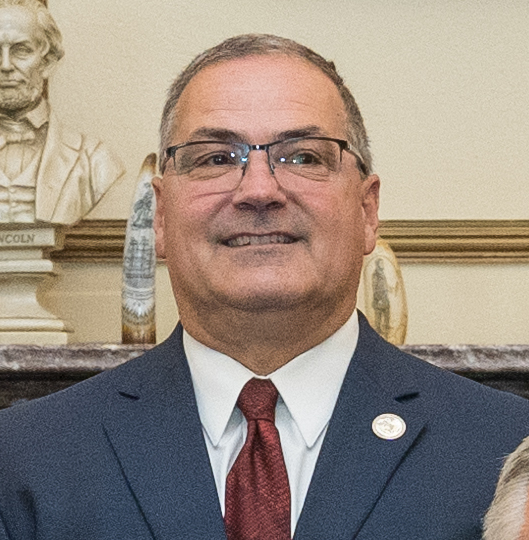

Member of the Indiana Senate from the 1st district
- In office November 9, 2022 – November 4, 2026
- Preceded by: Michael Griffin
- Succeeded by: Scott Houldieson

Personal details
- Party: Republican
- Spouse: Cindy
- Education: Purdue University Northwest

Dan Dernulc is an American politician currently serving as a member of the Indiana Senate, representing Indiana's 1st Senate district. He won in the general election defeating the incumbent Michael Griffin and assumed office on November 9, 2022. He was the first Republican candidate to be elected in Indiana's 1st Senate district since 1999.

In 2025, Dernulc drew national attention as one of 21 Republican senators to vote against mid-decade redistricting in Indiana, which would have net Republicans an additional 2 seats in the U.S. House of Representatives, prompting criticism from national and state Republicans.

In 2026, Dernulc lost renomination to Trevor De Vries, 23.3%–75.1%

== Biography ==
Dernulc is a graduate of Purdue University Northwest and holds a bachelor's degree in electrical engineering technology. Prior to Dernulc's election to the senate, he was a Lake County Councilman. He serves on the Senate Committees on Education and Career Development; Environmental Affairs; Local Government; and Pensions and Labor. While in office, he voted against a 2025 attempt to redraw Indiana's congressional maps. He ran for re-election in 2026 however he lost in the Republican primary by 52%.

== Personal life ==
Dernulc and his wife, Cindy, live in Highland where they raised four children and now have three grandchildren.
