= Township trustee =

A township trustee or town trustee is a public official who is elected to a civil township's government. Trustees are responsible for everyday city governance, including budget management, road maintenance, record keeping, and humanitarian aid. Trustees are typically elected to boards in regular election cycles, and are most common in the Midwestern and Northeastern United States.

The Office of the Public Guardian and Trustee is a non-elected civil servant in Ontario who manages certain residents' legal, personal, and financial interests and their estates. The Office of the Public Guardian and Trustee can make power of attorney, administer estates, and deal with dissolved corporations.
