= Indiana's 1st Senate district =

American legislative district

Indiana's 1st Senate district is one of the fifty districts of the Indiana Senate. The district was originally based around Hammond and parts of surrounding areas. Redistricting passed by the Indiana General Assembly in 2011 shifted the district's boundaries, effective January 2013. The district was changed to include Hammond's 4th, 5th, 6th city districts, the town of Munster, the town of Highland, the west side of the town of Griffith, the north side of the town of Dyer, parts of the town of Schererville, and part of the City of Crown Point.

The district is currently represented by Dan Dernulc, a member of the Republican Party of Indiana. A single term is four years in length. Prior to 1970 State Senators only conducted legislative business every two years.

== List of state senators ==
State Senator	Party	Years	Electoral history
Dan Dernulc	Republican	2022–Present	Defeated incumbent Michael Griffin.
Michael Griffin	Democratic	2022	Was appointed to finish Frank Mrvan's term.
Frank Mrvan Jr	Democratic	1999–2022	Retired at the beginning of 2022.
Sandra Dempsey	Republican	1995-1999	Voted in after determined clerk mistake
Frank Mrvan Jr	Democratic	1979-1994	First Elected in 1978
William Carl Christy	Democratic	1955, '57, '61, '63, '65, '67, '69, '71-'78	
Edward Leo Chubinski	Democratic	1951, '53	
Charles Francis Fleming	Democratic	1943, '45, '47	Resigned December 1, 1948; no one elected to complete his term
Elliott Rifenburg Conroy	Democratic	1939, '41	
Raymond C. Sohl	Democratic	1935, '37	
Frank C. Holman	Democratic	1931, '33	
William Franklin Hodges	Republican	1923, '25, '27, '29	

== Historical election results ==
General 2022
Party	Candidate	Votes	%
Republican	Dan Dernulc	23,390	52.3
Democratic	Michael Griffin	21,340	47.7
Total:		44,730	
Republican gain from Democratic

General 2018
Party	Candidate	Votes	%
Democratic	Frank Mrvan Jr	29,578	63.3
Republican	Charles Kallas	17,144	36.7
Total:		46,722	

General 2014
Party	Candidate	Votes	%
Democratic	Frank Ed Mrvan Jr.	15,538	59.7
Republican	Kenneth Stevenson	10,506	40.3
Total:		26,044	

General 2010
Party	Candidate	Votes	%
Democratic	Frank Mrvan Jr.	16,472	60.3
Republican	David Spudic	10,845	39.7
Total:		27,317	

General 2006
Party	Candidate	Votes	%
Democratic	Frank Mrvan Jr.	15,852	61.8
Republican	Chris Marrow	9,791	38.2
Total:		25,643	

General 2002
Party	Candidate	Votes	%
Democratic	Frank Mrvan Jr.	14,449	100
Total:		14,449	

General 1998
Party	Candidate	Votes	%
Democratic	Frank Mrvan Jr.	12,738	50.9
Republican	Sandra Dempsey	12,270	49.1
Total:		25,008	

General 1994
Party	Candidate	1st Vote	%	Recount Vote	%
Democratic	Frank Mrvan Jr.	13,114	50.1	12,638	49.9
Republican	Sandra Dempsey	13,060	49.9	12,641	50.1
Total:		26,174		25,279	

General 1990
Party	Candidate	Vote	%
Democratic	Frank Mrvan Jr.	Unopposed	100

General 1986
Party	Candidate	Vote	%
Democratic	Frank Mrvan Jr.	17,498	79.6
Republican	Gregory Sanchez	4,494	20.4
Total:		21,992	

General 1982
Party	Candidate	Vote	%
Democratic	Frank Mrvan Jr.	22,623	81.6
Republican	John Drac	5,112	18.4
Total:		27,735	

General 1978
Party	Candidate	Vote	%
Democratic	Frank Mrvan Jr.	17,377	82.1
Republican	Robert Cantrell	3,802	17.9
Total:		21,179	

General 1974
Party	Candidate	Vote	%
Democratic	William Christy	19,641	81
Republican	Mary Thompson	4,610	19
Total:		24,251	

General 1970
Party	Candidate	Vote	%
Democratic	William Christy	87,229	63.8
Republican	Joseph Harkin	49,560	36.2
Total:		136,789	

General 1966
Party	Candidate	Vote	%
Democratic	William Christy	80,079	59.6
Republican	James Bradford	54,247	40.4
Total:		134,326	

General 1962
Party	Candidate	Vote	%
Democratic	William Christy	103,730	60.6
Republican	David Colosimo	67,610	39.4
Total:		171,340	

General 1958
Party	Candidate	Vote	%
Democratic	William Christy	96,025	66.8
Republican	Calvin Grubbs	47,697	33.2
Total:		143,722	

General 1954
Party	Candidate	Vote	%
Democratic	William Christy	80,256	61
Republican	Frank Gullstrom	51,475	39
Total:		131,731	

General 1950
Party	Candidate	Vote	%
Democratic	Edward Chubinski	63,868	53.9
Republican	Thomas Hodges	54,662	46.1
Total:		118,530	

General 1946
Party	Candidate	Vote	%
Democratic	Charles Fleming	51,165	51.9
Republican	Clayton Root	47,517	48.1
Total:		98,682	

General 1942
Party	Candidate	Vote	%
Democratic	Charles Fleming	43,898	53.2
Republican	Herbert Fisher	38,654	46.8
Total:		82,552	

General 1938
Party	Candidate	Vote	%
Democratic	Elliott Conroy	56,141	54.7
Republican	Clayton Root	46,547	45.3
Total:		102,688	

General 1934
Party	Candidate	Vote	%
Democratic	Raymond Sohl	42,866	52.2
Republican	James Nedji	39,288	47.8
Total:		82,154	

General 1930
Party	Candidate	Vote	%
Democratic	Frank Holman	26,732	53
Republican	William Hodges	23,745	47
Total:		50,477	

General 1926
Party	Candidate	Vote	%
Republican	William Hodges	28,948	100
Unopposed
Total:		28,948	

General 1922
Party	Candidate	Vote	%
Democratic	Frank Martin	6,669	37
Republican	William Hodges	11,313	63
Total:		17,982	
