= Marlin Stutzman =

American politician (born 1976)

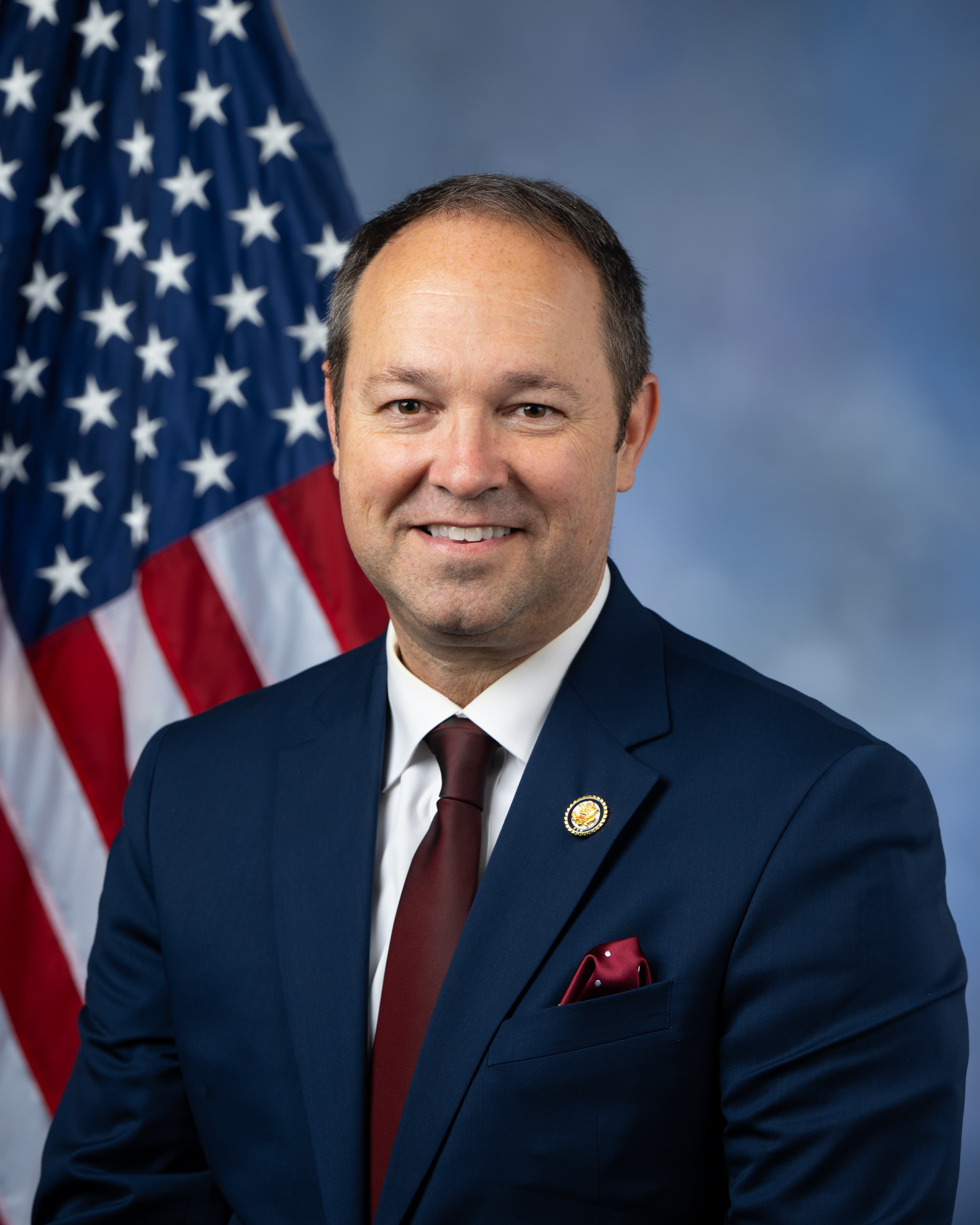
- Official portrait, 2025

Member of the U.S. House of Representatives from Indiana's 3rd district
- Incumbent
- Assumed office January 3, 2025
- Preceded by: Jim Banks
- In office November 2, 2010 (Note: Stutzman's official service begins on the date of the special election, while he was not sworn in until November 16, 2010.) – January 3, 2017
- Preceded by: Mark Souder
- Succeeded by: Jim Banks

Member of the Indiana Senate from the 13th district
- In office January 2009 – November 2, 2010
- Preceded by: Robert Meeks
- Succeeded by: Sue Glick

Member of the Indiana House of Representatives from the 52nd district
- In office January 2003 – January 2009
- Preceded by: Dale Sturtz
- Succeeded by: David Yarde

Personal details
- Born: Marlin Andrew Stutzman; August 31, 1976 (age 50) Sturgis, Michigan, U.S.
- Party: Republican
- Spouse: Christy Stutzman
- Education: Glen Oaks Community College (attended); Trine University (attended)
- Website: House website Campaign website

Marlin Andrew Stutzman (born August 31, 1976) is an American politician who has served as the U.S. representative from Indiana's 3rd congressional district since 2025, having previously represented that district from 2010 to 2017. A member of the Republican Party, Stutzman previously served in the Indiana House of Representatives from 2003 to 2009 and in the Indiana Senate from 2009 to 2010.

== Early life, education and career ==
Stutzman is a fourth-generation farmer who grew up on a farm located in both St. Joseph County, Michigan, and LaGrange County, Indiana. He graduated from Lake Area Christian High School located in Sturgis, Michigan, in 1994. He attended Glen Oaks Community College (in 1999) and Tri-State University, currently known as Trine University (from 2005 to 2007). As co-owner with his father, Albert, he runs Stutzman Farms, farming 4,000 acres (16 km^{2}) in the Michiana area. He is also owner of Stutzman Farms Trucking.

== State politics ==
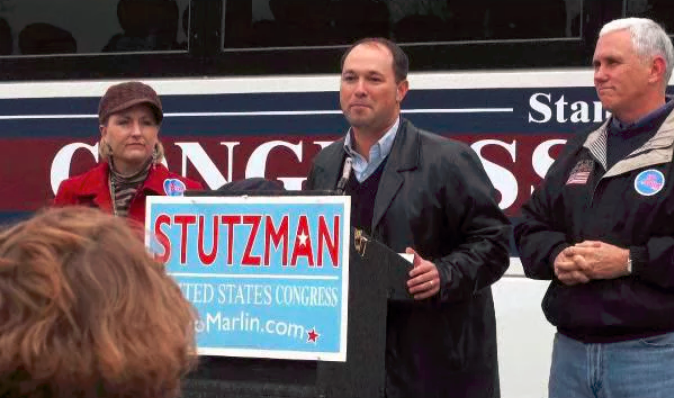
Stutzman campaigning with Mike Pence in 2010

First elected to the Indiana House of Representatives in 2002 at the age of 26, Stutzman served as the youngest member of the legislature until 2006. In 2009, he was elected to the Indiana Senate representing the 13th district. He ran for the Republican nomination for the 2010 U.S. Senate election in a bid to replace retiring incumbent Evan Bayh, but was defeated in the Republican primary by former U.S. Senator Dan Coats.

Committees

- Commerce, Public Policy & Interstate Cooperation
- Pensions & Labor
- Utilities & Technology – Ranking Member
- Natural Resources

Legislation

- Alternative Energy Incentive – Sponsor 2009
- Reduce Government Inefficiencies & Waste – Co-Author 2002
- Truth in Sentencing Amendment – Author
- Military Family Relief Fund – Author 2007
- SB 528: Indiana School Scholarship Tax Credit – Author

== U.S. House of Representatives ==
=== Committee assignments ===
- Committee on Financial Services
  - Subcommittee on Digital Assets, Financial Technology, and Artificial Intelligence
- Committee on the Budget

=== Caucus memberships ===
- Freedom Caucus
- Congressional Constitution Caucus (Co-chair)

Stutzman was elected in a November 2, 2010, special election to fill the rest of resigning Representative Mark Souder's term. He was simultaneously elected to a full two-year term to expire in 2013.

== Political positions ==
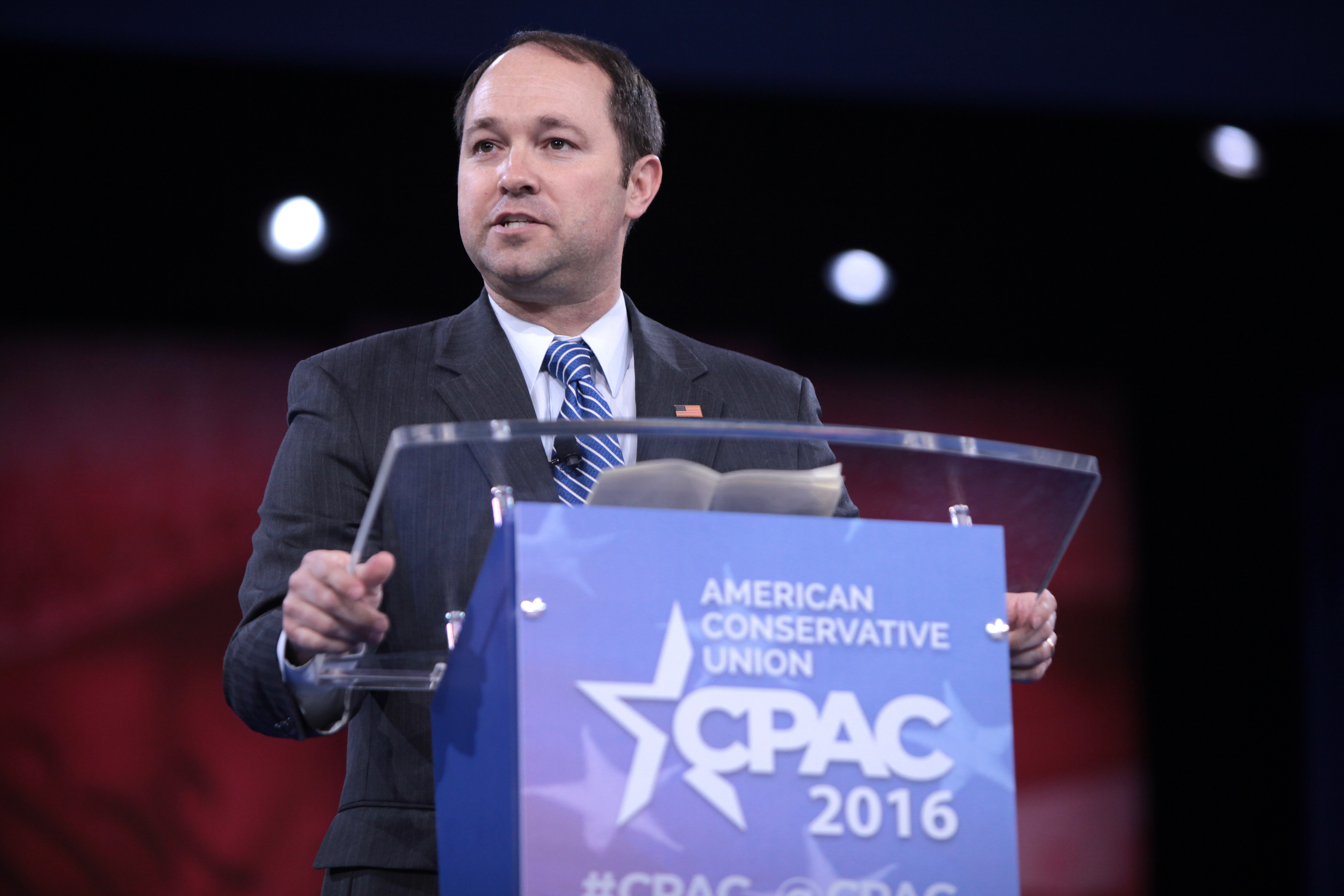
Stutzman speaking at CPAC in 2016

He served as the ranking member of the Indiana State Senate Utilities and Technology Committee and helped to pass alternative energy incentive legislation in Indiana.

In 2006 he served as the chairman of the Indiana Public Policy Committee.

=== Government waste ===
Stutzman advocates for more accountability in state government operations. He co-authored a bill to establish the Hoosier Grace Commission which passed in 2003. The commission helped eliminate wasteful state government spending and has brought fraud and/or scandals to public awareness.

=== Healthcare ===
In Congress, Stutzman has opposed the Affordable Care Act. In September 2013, he advocated attaching a measure defunding the Act to must-pass legislation funding the federal government. After the government subsequently shut down, Stutzman remarked that the issue at stake was no longer merely the Affordable Care Act, and Republicans would need some concession in order to reopen the government.

He voted in 2026 against extending the Affordable Care Act enhanced tax credits.

=== Taxes ===
In 2010, Stutzman signed a pledge sponsored by Americans for Prosperity promising to vote against any global warming legislation that would raise taxes.

== Political campaigns ==
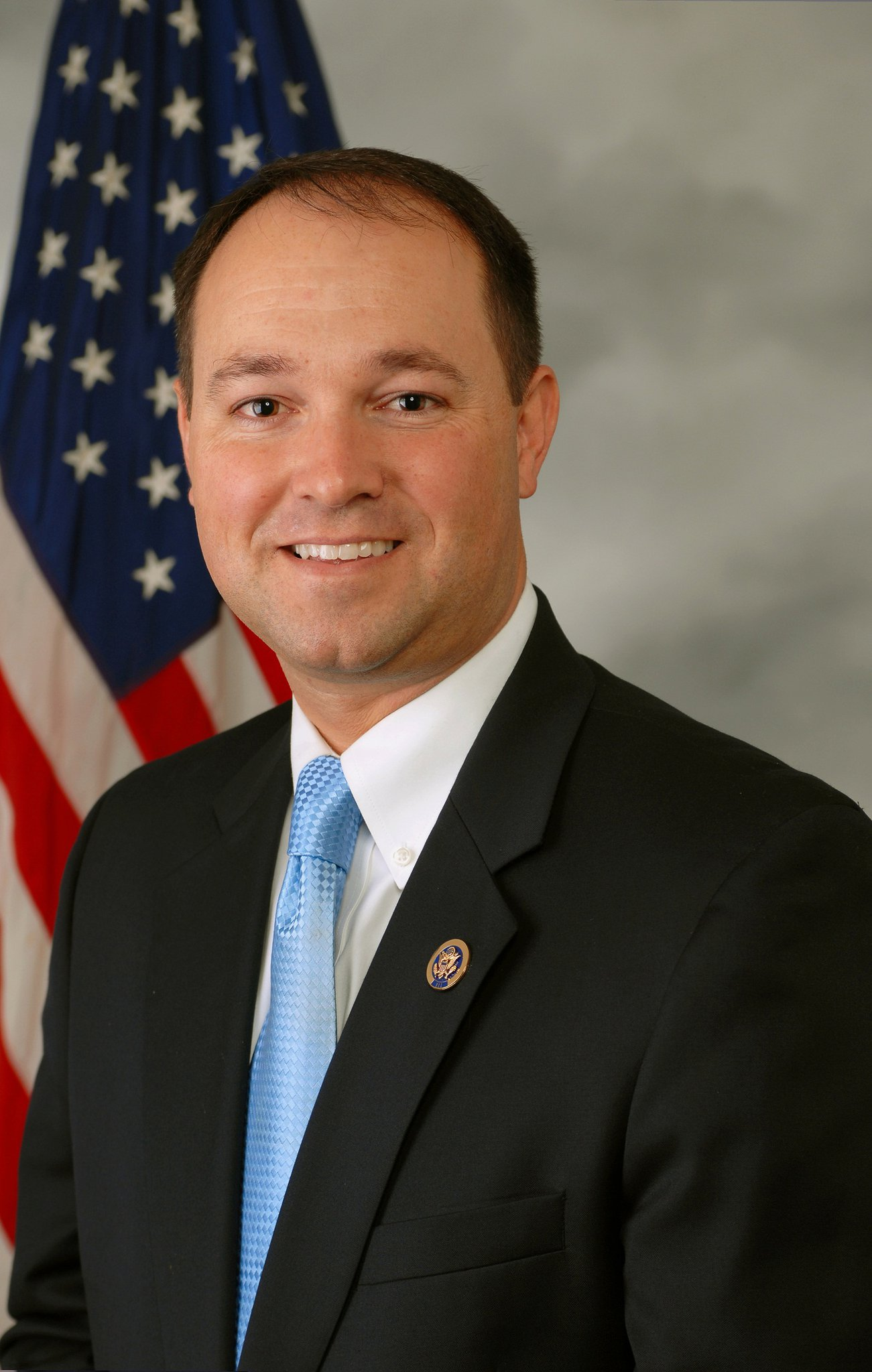
Official portrait, 2011

=== 2010 U.S. Senate campaign ===
Stutzman ran for the U.S. Senate seat vacated by incumbent Evan Bayh. He lost to former U.S. Senator Dan Coats in the primary.

=== 2010 U.S. House campaign ===
Incumbent U.S. Representative Mark Souder (R) resigned after admitting to an affair. This event occurred after he won the Republican primary on May 4. On June 12, Republicans from Indiana's third district met in Columbia City to choose Souder's replacement. Stutzman won decisively on the second ballot. He defeated the Democratic candidate in both the general election and the special election to fill the remainder of Souder's term (both held on the same day).

=== 2012 U.S. House campaign ===
Stutzman defeated his Democratic opponent Kevin Boyd by a 67%–33% margin.

=== 2014 U.S. House campaign ===
Stutzman defeated his Democratic opponent Justin Kuhnle by 66% - 27% margin. Libertarian candidate Scott Wise received 7%.

=== 2016 U.S. Senate campaign ===
On May 9, 2015, Stutzman announced he would run in 2016 for the U.S. Senate seat he had failed to be nominated for in 2010. He was endorsed by the Club for Growth and Senator Rand Paul. Stutzman was defeated by fellow Republican Todd Young in the primary election.

=== 2024 U.S. House campaign ===
On April 18, 2023, Stutzman announced his candidacy in his old congressional district after his successor Jim Banks announced his candidacy for the U.S. Senate. He narrowly defeated 2019 Fort Wayne mayoral candidate Tim Smith by a margin of 1,307 votes in a closer than expected primary.

== Electoral history ==
2010 Republican Senate Primary Results
Party	Candidate	Votes	%
Republican	Dan Coats	217,225	39.5
Republican	Marlin Stutzman	160,981	29.2
Republican	John Hostettler	124,494	22.6
Republican	Don Bates, Jr.	24,664	4.5
Republican	Richard Behney	23,005	4.2
Total votes		550,369	100

2010 House General Election Results
Party	Candidate	Votes	%
Republican	Marlin Stutzman	116,030	63
Democratic	Thomas Hayhurst	61,149	33
Libertarian	Scott Wise	7,636	4
Total votes		184,815	100

2012 House General Election Results
Party	Candidate	Votes	%
Republican	Marlin Stutzman (Incumbent)	187,872	67.04
Democratic	Kevin Boyd	92,363	32.96
Total votes		280,235	100.00
Republican hold			

Indiana's 3rd Congressional District Election (2014)
Party	Candidate	Votes	%
Republican	Marlin Stutzman*	102,889	69.15
Democratic	Justin Kuhnle	39,771	26.73
Libertarian	Scott Wise	6,133	4.12
Total votes		148,793	100.00
Turnout			31
Republican hold			

2024 Indiana's 3rd congressional district Republican primary results
Party	Candidate	Votes	%
Republican	Marlin Stutzman	19,507	24.2
Republican	Tim Smith	18,204	22.6
Republican	Wendy Davis	15,660	19.5
Republican	Andy Zay	13,157	16.4
Republican	Grant Bucher	8,259	10.3
Republican	Jon Kenworthy	3,064	3.8
Republican	Mike Felker	1,417	1.8
Republican	Eric Whalen	1,189	1.5
Total votes		80,457	100.0

2024 Indiana's 3rd congressional district election
Party	Candidate	Votes	%
Republican	Marlin Stutzman	202,653	65.0
Democratic	Kiley Adolph	97,871	31.4
Libertarian	Jarrad Lancaster	11,015	3.5
Total votes		311,539	100.0

=== U.S. Senate ===
2016 U.S. Senate Indiana Republican primary results
Party	Candidate	Votes	%
Republican	Todd Young	661,136	67.08%
Republican	Marlin Stutzman	324,429	32.92%
Total votes		985,565	100.00%

== Personal life ==
Stutzman and his wife, Christy, have two sons, Payton and Preston. On May 8, 2018, Christy Stutzman won the Republican primary to represent Indiana's 49th State House district. On November 6, 2018, Christy was elected to the State House. Stutzman is a Baptist.

U.S. House of Representatives
Preceded by Mark Souder	Member of the U.S. House of Representatives from Indiana's 3rd congressional district 2010–2017	Succeeded by Jim Banks
Preceded by Jim Banks	Member of the U.S. House of Representatives from Indiana's 3rd congressional district 2025–present	Incumbent
U.S. order of precedence (ceremonial)
Preceded by Ryan Zinke	United States representatives by seniority 239th	Succeeded by Jake Auchincloss
