= 2026 Indiana Senate election =

- November 3, 2026

25 of the 50 seats in the Indiana Senate 26 seats needed for a majority
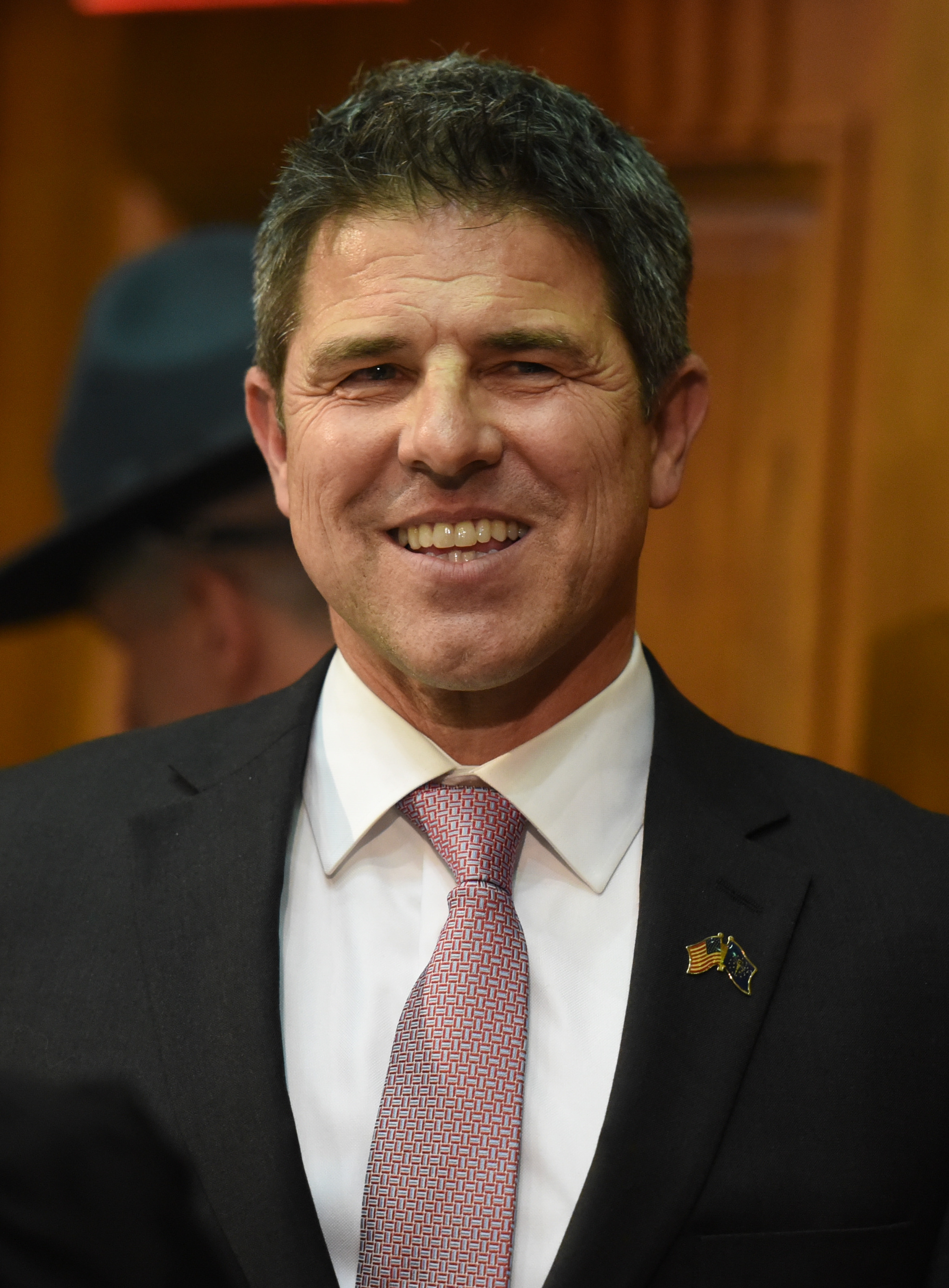

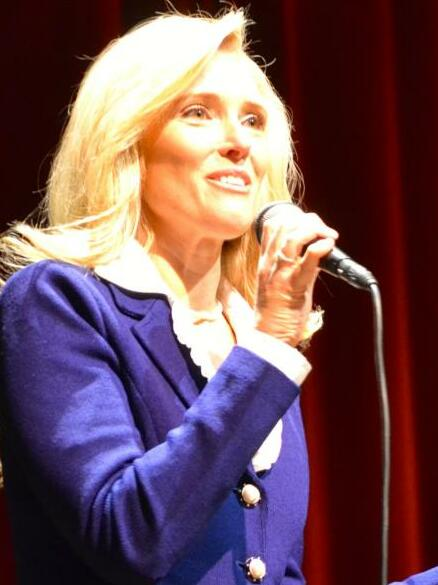
	Majority party	Minority party
Leader	Rodric Bray	Shelli Yoder
Party	Republican	Democratic
Leader since	November 20, 2018	January 13, 2025
Leader's seat	37th district	40th district
Seats before	40	10
Seats after	34	15
Seat change	▼5	▲5
- Results: Result TBD; Republican hold Democratic hold Democratic gain
President pro tempore before election
Rodric Bray
Republican
Elected President pro tempore
Chris Garten
Republican

The 2026 Indiana Senate election was held on November 3, 2026, in the U.S. state of Indiana, coinciding with other elections in the state, including for U.S. House, Indiana secretary of state, Indiana treasurer, Indiana state auditor, and Indiana House, as well as various other local elections. Voters elected members in 25 of the 50 seats in the Indiana Senate to serve four-year terms in single-member constituencies. The primary elections took place on May 5.

Democrats had a net gain of 5 seats, falling just one seat shy of breaking Republicans' two-thirds supermajority.

== Primary election ==
=== Failed congressional redistricting ===
2025 Indiana Senate redistricting vote Republican no (21) Republican yes (19) Democratic no (10)

GOP redistricting opponents primary results Lost re-nomination Retired Won re-nomination

In late 2025, as a part of the broader 2025–2026 United States redistricting, Republican President Donald Trump urged the state of Indiana to redraw its congressional districts to oust two incumbent Democratic congressmen from the state. The proposal ran into unexpectedly-strong opposition in the Republican-supermajority Senate, with over a dozen Republican senators voicing opposition to the move ahead of the vote. In an attempt to pressure holdouts to vote in favor of redrawing the map, Trump vowed to back primary challengers to all Republicans who vote against it. Independent of these actions, a number of senators were targets of threats of violence against them ahead of the vote, including bomb threats and swatting calls. Ultimately, the Senate on December 11, 2025, voted 31–19 against redrawing the congressional maps, with 21 Republicans joining all 10 Democrats in opposition.

=== Campaign ===
Following the vote, Republican Governor Mike Braun vowed to assist Trump in primarying the Republican senators who voted against redistricting. The conservative organization Turning Point Action additionally promised to donate large amounts of money to further that goal. Senator Greg Walker, who was adamantly against redistricting, reversed his decision to retire and announced in January 2026 that he would run for reelection. In the leadup to the primary, Super PACs and other outside groups have spent unprecedentedly high amounts of money on primary races, exclusively targeting Republicans who voted against redistricting, regardless of other ideological factors. President Donald Trump endorsed all incumbent Republican senators who voted for redistricting and endorsed eight primary challengers, one for nearly every Republican senator running who voted against it.

Ad spending in these races has topped $8 million, raising concerns that this money is being diverted from competitive general election races across the country. Additionally, some have described the challengers' campaigns as lacking a clear focus beyond retribution from Trump. Despite this, multiple incumbents have expressed concern about their prospects based on their internal polling. Trump allies expressed hope to oust between three and five of the eight incumbents they are challenging.

=== Results ===
Five of the seven challengers whom Trump endorsed defeated an incumbent state senator. A sixth incumbent who voted against redistricting whose challenger was not endorsed by Trump also lost renomination. Two of the five nominees whom Trump endorsed in the primaries against the incumbents who voted against the redistricting lost the general election. These districts are District 1 and District 11. The District 31 GOP nominee, Juanita Albright who replaced Kyle Walker also lost the general election as well.

== Overview ==
2026 Indiana State Senate general election
Party	Votes	Percentage	% change	Seats before	Seats up	Candidates	Seats won	Seats after	+/–
Republican				40	22	24	16	34	▼5
Democratic				10	3	24	8	15	▲5
Independent				0	0	1	0	0	Steady
Libertarian				0	0	1	0	0	Steady
Totals		100.00%	—	50	25	50	25	50	—

=== Predictions ===
Source	Ranking	As of
Sabato's Crystal Ball	Safe R	January 22, 2026
State Navigate	Safe R	October 21, 2026

== Retirements ==
A total of four incumbent state senators – two Republicans and two Democrats – announced their retirements.

=== Republicans ===
1. District 31: Kyle Walker retired.
2. District 39: Eric Bassler retired.

=== Democrats ===
1. District 29: J. D. Ford retired to run for Indiana's 5th congressional district.
2. District 46: Andrea Hunley retired to run for mayor of Indianapolis in 2027.

== Incumbents defeated ==
=== In primary elections ===
==== Republicans ====
1. District 1: Dan Dernulc lost renomination to Trevor De Vries.
2. District 6: Rick Niemeyer lost renomination to Jay Starkey.
3. District 11: Linda Rogers lost renomination to Brian Schmutzler.
4. District 17: Nick McKinley lost renomination to Chris Parker.
5. District 19: Travis Holdman lost renomination to Blake Fiechter.
6. District 21: Jim Buck lost renomination to Tracey Powell.
7. District 41: Greg Walker lost renomination to Michelle Davis.

== Nominees endorsed by Trump in the primaries against the incumbents who voted against redistricting or retired due to voting no on redistricting who lost the general election ==
1. District 1: Republican Trevor De Vries lost to Democrat Scott Houldieson.
2. District 11: Republican Brian Schmutzler lost to Democrat Gabrianna Gratzol.
3. District 31: Republican Juanita Albright lost to Democrat Kerry Forestal.

== District 1 ==
1st district election
Candidate	Scott Houldieson	Trevor De Vries
Party	Democratic	Republican
Popular vote	26,570	19,941
Percentage	57.1%	42.9%
- Results by precinct Houldieson: 50–60% 60–70% 70–80% 80–90% De Vries: 50–60% 60–70% No votes
State senator before election
Dan Dernulc
Republican
Elected State senator
Scott Houldieson
Democratic

Incumbent Republican Dan Dernulc ran for re-election. He was previously elected in 2022 with 52.3% of the vote. Dernulc voted against redistricting. Donald Trump won this district with 52.9% of the vote in the 2024 presidential election.

=== Republican primary ===
==== Nominee ====
- Trevor De Vries, Lake County precinct committeeman and insurance broker

==== Eliminated in primary ====
- Dan Dernulc, incumbent state senator
- Nader Liddawi, financial analyst

==== Endorsements ====
Dan Dernulc

Organizations

- National Federation of Independent Business Indiana PAC
Trevor De Vries

Organizations

- Americans for Prosperity
- Turning Point Action

==== Results ====
Results by precinct: De Vries: 50–60%; 60–70%; 70–80%; 80–90%; 90–100%

District 1 Republican primary
Party	Candidate	Votes	%
Republican	Trevor De Vries	6,765	75.1
Republican	Dan Dernulc (incumbent)	2,097	23.3
Republican	Nader Liddawi	142	1.6
Total votes		9,004	100.0

=== Democratic primary ===
==== Nominee ====
- Scott Houldieson

==== Results ====
District 1 Democratic primary
Party	Candidate	Votes	%
Democratic	Scott Houldieson	8,173	100.0
Total votes		8,173	100.0

=== General election ===
==== Post-primary endorsements ====
Trevor De Vries

Organizations

- Indiana Farm Bureau AgELECT PAC
- Indiana Right to Life
Scott Houldieson

Executive branch officials

- Pete Buttigieg, former secretary of transportation (2021–2025) and former mayor of South Bend, Indiana (2012–2020)

U.S. senators

- Bernie Sanders, Vermont (2007–present) (Independent)

Labor unions

- Indiana AFL–CIO

==== Results ====
District 1 election
Party	Candidate	Votes	%
Democratic	Scott Houldieson	26,570	57.13
Republican	Trevor De Vries	19,941	42.87
Total votes		46,511	100.0
Democratic gain from Republican			

== District 4 ==
4th district election
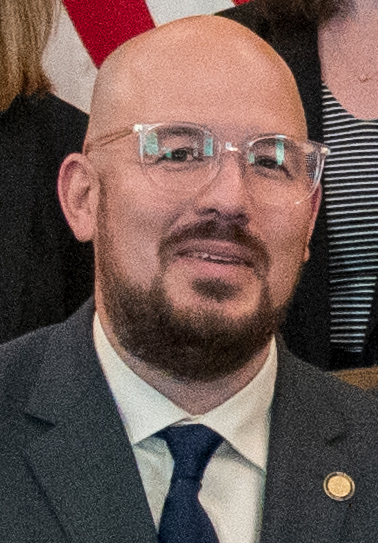

Candidate	Rodney Pol Jr.	Nate Uldricks
Party	Democratic	Republican
Popular vote	24,169	15,462
Percentage	61.0%	39.0%
- Pol: 50–60% 60–70% 70–80% 80–90% >90% Uldricks: 50–60%
State senator before election
Rodney Pol Jr.
Democratic
Elected State senator
Rodney Pol Jr.
Democratic

The district has been represented by Democrat Rodney Pol Jr. since 2021. He was elected with 52.3% of the vote in 2022. Donald Trump won this district with 50.0% of the vote in the 2024 presidential election.

=== Democratic primary ===
==== Nominee ====
- Rodney Pol Jr., incumbent state senator

==== Results ====
District 4 Democratic primary
Party	Candidate	Votes	%
Democratic	Rodney Pol Jr. (incumbent)	7,457	100.0
Total votes		7,457	100.0

=== Republican primary ===
==== Nominee ====
- Nate Uldricks, Porter County GOP chairman

==== Eliminated in primary ====
- Johannes Poulard, candidate for this district in 2022

==== Endorsements ====
Nate Uldricks

Statewide officials

- Mike Braun, governor of Indiana (2025–present) and former senator (2019–2025)

Local officials

- Austin Bonta, mayor of Portage (2023–present)

==== Results ====
District 4 Republican primary
Party	Candidate	Votes	%
Republican	Nate Uldricks	3,371	74.3
Republican	Johannes Poulard	1,164	25.7
Total votes		4,535	100.0

=== General election ===
==== Post-primary endorsements ====
Rodney Pol

Organizations

- Indiana Farm Bureau AgELECT PAC

==== Results ====
District 4 election
Party	Candidate	Votes	%
Democratic	Rodney Pol Jr. (incumbent)	24,169	61.0
Republican	Nate Uldricks	15,462	39.0
Total votes		39,631	100.0
Democratic hold			

== District 6 ==
6th district election
Candidate	Jay Starkey	Kate-Lynn Holley
Party	Republican	Democratic
Popular vote	25,623	19,583
Percentage	56.7%	43.3%
- Starkey: 50–60% 60–70% 70–80% 80–90% >90% Holley: 50–60% 60–70% 70–80%
State senator before election
Rick Niemeyer
Republican
Elected State senator
Jay Starkey
Republican

The district has been represented by Republican Rick Niemeyer since 2014. Niemeyer was re-elected unopposed in 2022. Niemeyer voted against redistricting. Donald Trump won this district with 67.2% of the vote in the 2024 presidential election.

=== Republican primary ===
==== Nominee ====
- Jay Starkey, carpenter

==== Eliminated in primary ====
- Rick Niemeyer, incumbent state senator

==== Endorsements ====
Jay Starkey

Statewide officials

- Micah Beckwith, lieutenant governor of Indiana (2025–present)
- Mike Braun, governor of Indiana (2025–present) and former senator (2019–2025)
- Todd Rokita, attorney general of Indiana (2021–present) and former IN-04 (2011–2019)

Organizations

- Americans for Prosperity
Rick Niemeyer

Organizations

- National Federation of Independent Business Indiana PAC

==== Results ====
Results by county: Starkey: 50–60%; 60–70%; Niemeyer: 60–70%

District 6 Republican primary
Party	Candidate	Votes	%
Republican	Jay Starkey	6,340	56.1
Republican	Rick Niemeyer (incumbent)	4,968	43.9
Total votes		11,308	100.0

=== Democratic primary ===
==== Nominee ====
- Kate-Lynn Holley, realtor and former WWE wrestler

==== Results ====
District 6 Democratic primary
Party	Candidate	Votes	%
Democratic	Kate-Lynn Holley	5,225	100.0
Total votes		5,225	100.0

=== General election ===
==== Results ====
District 6 election
Party	Candidate	Votes	%
Republican	Jay Starkey	25,623	56.7
Democratic	Kate-Lynn Holley	19,583	43.3
Total votes		45,044	100.0
Republican hold			

== District 11 ==
11th district election
Candidate	Gabrianna Gratzol	Brian Schmutzler
Party	Democratic	Republican
Popular vote	19,450	18,381
Percentage	51.4%	48.6%
- County results Gratzol: 50–60% Schmutzler: 50–60%
State senator before election
Linda Rogers
Republican
Elected State senator
Gabrianna Gratzol
Democrat

The district has been represented by Republican Linda Rogers since 2018. Rogers was re-elected with 61.7% of the vote in 2022. Rogers voted against redistricting. Donald Trump won this district with 56.2% of the vote in the 2024 presidential election.

=== Republican primary ===
==== Nominee ====
- Brian Schmutzler, physician

==== Eliminated in primary ====
- Linda Rogers, incumbent state senator

==== Endorsements ====
Brian Schmutzler

Executive branch officials

- Donald Trump, president of the United States (2017–2021, 2025–present)

U.S. representatives

- Marlin Stutzman, IN-3 (2010–2017) and (2025–present)

Statewide officials

- Micah Beckwith, lieutenant governor of Indiana (2025–present)
- Mike Braun, governor of Indiana (2025–present) and former senator (2019–2025)

Organizations

- Turning Point Action
Linda Rogers

Statewide officials

- Mitch Daniels, former governor of Indiana (2005–2013)

Organizations

- Indiana Farm Bureau AgELECT PAC
- National Federation of Independent Business Indiana PAC
- NRA Political Victory Fund

==== Results ====
Results by county: Schmultzer: 50–60%; 60–70%

District 11 Republican primary
Party	Candidate	Votes	%
Republican	Brian Schmutzler	5,461	59.2
Republican	Linda Rogers (incumbent)	3,758	40.8
Total votes		9,219	100.0

=== Democratic primary ===
==== Nominee ====
- Gabrianna Gratzol, community organizer and activist

District 11 Democratic primary
Party	Candidate	Votes	%
Democratic	Gabrianna Gratzol	4,577	100.0
Total votes		4,577	100.0

=== General election ===
==== Post-primary endorsements ====
Brian Schmutzler

Organizations

- Indiana Farm Bureau AgELECT PAC
Gabrianna Gratzol

Executive branch officials

- Pete Buttigieg, former secretary of transportation (2021–2025) and former mayor of South Bend, Indiana (2012–2020)

==== Results ====
District 11 election
Party	Candidate	Votes	%
Democratic	Gabrianna Gratzol	19,450	51.4
Republican	Brian Schmutzler	18,381	48.6
Total votes		37,831	100.0
Democratic gain from Republican			

== District 14 ==
14th district election
Candidate	Tyler Johnson	Blaine Sefton
Party	Republican	Democratic
Incumbent State senator
Tyler Johnson
Republican

The district has been represented by Republican Tyler Johnson since 2022. Johnson was elected with 65.1% of the vote in 2022. Johnson voted for redistricting. Donald Trump won this district with 62.1% of the vote in the 2024 presidential election.

=== Republican primary ===
==== Nominee ====
- Tyler Johnson, incumbent state senator

==== Endorsements ====
Tyler Johnson

Executive branch officials

- Donald Trump, president of the United States (2017–2021, 2025–present)

=== Democratic primary ===
==== Nominee ====
- Blaine Sefton

=== General election ===
==== Results ====
District 14 election
Party	Candidate	Votes	%
Republican	Tyler Johnson (incumbent)	16,297	53.9
Democratic	Blaine Sefton	13,955	46.1
Total votes		30,252	100.0
Republican hold			

== District 15 ==
15th district election
Candidate	Liz Brown	Julie McGill
Party	Republican	Democratic
Incumbent State senator
Liz Brown
Republican

The district has been represented by Republican Liz Brown since 2014. Brown was re-elected unopposed in 2022. Brown voted for redistricting. Donald Trump won this district with 57.6% of the vote in the 2024 presidential election.

=== Republican primary ===
Although Brown voted in favor of redistricting, she faced a prominent primary challenge from former Allen County councilman and U.S. senator Jim Banks staffer Darren Vogt primarily due to her refusal as chair of the state Senate Judiciary Committee to schedule a hearing for a Todd Rokita-backed immigration bill. Certified primary results showed Brown leading by a narrow margin of 15 votes. On May 19, Vogt filed a recount petition.

==== Declared ====
- Liz Brown, incumbent state senator

==== Eliminated in primary ====
- Darren Vogt, Northwest Allen County Schools board member, former Allen County councilman, candidate for this district in 2014

==== Endorsements ====
Liz Brown

Executive branch officials

- Donald Trump, president of the United States (2017–2021, 2025–present)

Statewide officials

- Mike Braun, governor of Indiana (2025–present) and former senator (2019–2025)

State legislators

- Bob Morris, state representative for the 84th district (2010–present)

Organizations

- Indiana Farm Bureau AgELECT PAC
- National Federation of Independent Business Indiana PAC
Darren Vogt

U.S. senators

- Jim Banks, Indiana (2025–present)

Statewide officials

- Daniel Elliott, Indiana state treasurer (2023–present)
- Todd Rokita, attorney general of Indiana (2021–present) and former IN-04 (2011–2019)

Organizations

- NRA Political Victory Fund

==== Results ====
District 15 Republican primary
Party	Candidate	Votes	%
Republican	Liz Brown (incumbent)	5,241	50.1
Republican	Darren Vogt	5,227	49.9
Total votes		10,468	100.0

=== Democratic primary ===
==== Nominee ====
- Julie McGill, small business owner

==== Eliminated in primary ====
- Chloe Andis, U.S. Air Force veteran, defense consultant

==== Endorsements ====
Chloe Andis

Organizations

- Run for Something

==== Results ====
District 15 Democratic primary
Party	Candidate	Votes	%
Democratic	Julie McGill	3,092	55.6
Democratic	Chloe Andis	2,466	44.4
Total votes		5,558	100.0

=== General election ===
==== Results ====
District 15 election
Party	Candidate	Votes	%
Democratic	Julie McGill	21,699	51.8
Republican	Liz Brown (incumbent)	20,246	48.3
Total votes		41,945	100.0
Democratic gain from Republican			

== District 17 ==
17th district election
Candidate	Chris Parker	Cynthia Wehr
Party	Republican	Democratic
Incumbent State senator
Nick McKinley
Republican

The district has been represented by Republican Andy Zay since 2016. Zay was re-elected with 75.1% of the vote in 2022. In December 2025, Governor Mike Braun appointed Zay to the Indiana Utility Regulatory Commission. During the caucus election among precinct committee members, Nick McKinley was elected to fill the remainder of Zay's term. Donald Trump won this district with 72.2% of the vote in the 2024 presidential election.

=== Republican primary ===
==== Nominee ====
- Chris Parker, realtor

==== Eliminated in primary ====
- Michael Hensley, school board president of Manchester Community Schools
- Nick McKinley, incumbent state senator

==== Declined ====
- Andy Zay, former state senator (2016–2026)

==== Endorsements ====
Nick McKinley

Organizations

- Indiana Farm Bureau AgELECT PAC
- NRA Political Victory Fund

==== Results ====
Results by county: Parker: 50–60%; 60–70%; McKinley: 50–60%

District 17 Republican primary
Party	Candidate	Votes	%
Republican	Chris Parker	5,667	46.1
Republican	Nick McKinley (incumbent)	5,113	41.6
Republican	Michael Hensley	1,512	12.3
Total votes		12,292	100.0

=== Democratic primary ===
==== Nominee ====
- Cynthia Wehr, nurse

District 17 Democratic primary
Party	Candidate	Votes	%
Democratic	Cynthia M. Wehr	2,801	100.0
Total votes		2,801	100.0

=== General election ===
==== Post-primary endorsements ====
Chris Parker

Organizations

- Indiana Farm Bureau AgELECT PAC

==== Results ====
District 17 election
Party	Candidate	Votes	%
Republican	Chris Parker	22,674	64
Democratic	Cynthia Wehr	12,765	36
Total votes		35,439	100.0
Republican hold			

== District 19 ==
19th district election
Candidate	Blake Fiechter	Timothy Murphy
Party	Republican	Democratic
Incumbent State senator
Travis Holdman
Republican

The district has been represented by Republican Travis Holdman since 2008. Holdman was re-elected unopposed in 2022. Holdman voted against redistricting. Donald Trump won this district with 68.5% of the vote in the 2024 presidential election.

=== Republican primary ===
==== Nominee ====
- Blake Fiechter, Bluffton city councilman

==== Eliminated in primary ====
- Travis Holdman, incumbent state senator

==== Endorsements ====
Blake Fiechter

Executive branch officials

- Donald Trump, president of the United States (2017–2021, 2025–present)

U.S. senators

- Jim Banks, Indiana (2025–present)

U.S. representatives

- Erin Houchin, IN-9 (2023–present)

Statewide officials

- Mike Braun, governor of Indiana (2025–present) and former senator (2019–2025)

Organizations

- Turning Point Action
Travis Holdman

Organizations

- Indiana Farm Bureau AgELECT PAC
- National Federation of Independent Business Indiana PAC
- NRA Political Victory Fund

==== Results ====
Results by county: Fietcher: 50–60%; 60–70%

District 19 Republican primary
Party	Candidate	Votes	%
Republican	Blake Fiechter	8,684	61.5
Republican	Travis Holdman (incumbent)	5,441	38.5
Total votes		14,125	100.0

=== Democratic primary ===
==== Nominee ====
- Timothy Murphy, pastor

District 19 Democratic primary
Party	Candidate	Votes	%
Democratic	Timothy Murphy	3,288	100.0
Total votes		3,288	100.0

=== General election ===
==== Post-primary endorsements ====
Blake Fiechter

Organizations

- Indiana Farm Bureau AgELECT PAC

==== Results ====
District 19 election
Party	Candidate	Votes	%
Republican	Blake Fiechter	20,773	59.2
Democratic	Timothy Murphy	14,324	40.8
Total votes		35,097	100.0
Republican hold			

== District 21 ==
21st district election
Candidate	Tracey Powell	Kirsten Root
Party	Republican	Democratic
Incumbent State senator
Jim Buck
Republican

The district has been represented by Republican Jim Buck since 2008. Buck was re-elected with 64% of the vote in 2022. Buck voted against redistricting. Donald Trump won this district with 61.0% of the vote in the 2024 presidential election.

=== Republican primary ===
==== Nominee ====
- Tracey Powell, Tipton County commissioner

==== Eliminated in primary ====
- Jim Buck, incumbent state senator

==== Endorsements ====
Jim Buck

Executive branch officials

- Mike Pence, vice president of the United States (2017–2021)

Statewide officials

- Mitch Daniels, former governor of Indiana (2005–2013)
- Edwin Simcox, former Indiana Secretary of State (1978–1986)

State legislators

- Michael Karickhoff, state representative for the 30th district (2010–present)

Local officials

- Andy Cook, former mayor of Westfield (2008–2024)

Organizations

- Indiana Farm Bureau AgELECT PAC
- National Federation of Independent Business Indiana PAC
- NRA Political Victory Fund
Tracey Powell

Executive branch officials

- Donald Trump, president of the United States (2017–2021, 2025–present)

U.S. senators

- Jim Banks, Indiana (2025–present)

U.S. representatives

- Erin Houchin, IN-9 (2023–present)

Statewide officials

- Mike Braun, governor of Indiana (2025–present) and former senator (2019–2025)

Local officials

- Scott Willis, mayor of Westfield (2024–present)

Organizations

- Americans for Prosperity
- Turning Point Action

==== Results ====
Results by county: Powell: 60–70%; 70–80%

District 21 Republican primary
Party	Candidate	Votes	%
Republican	Tracey Powell	8,523	64.7
Republican	Jim Buck (incumbent)	4,648	35.3
Total votes		13,171	100.0

=== Democratic primary ===
==== Nominee ====
- Kirsten Root, social worker

==== Eliminated in primary ====
- Joseph Kazlas, Navy veteran

==== Endorsements ====
Kirsten Root

Organizations

- Vote Common Good

=== General election ===
==== Results ====
District 21 election
Party	Candidate	Votes	%
Republican	Tracey Powell	28,046	53.2
Democratic	Kirsten Root	24,689	46.8
Total votes		52,735	100.0
Republican hold			

== District 22 ==
22nd district election
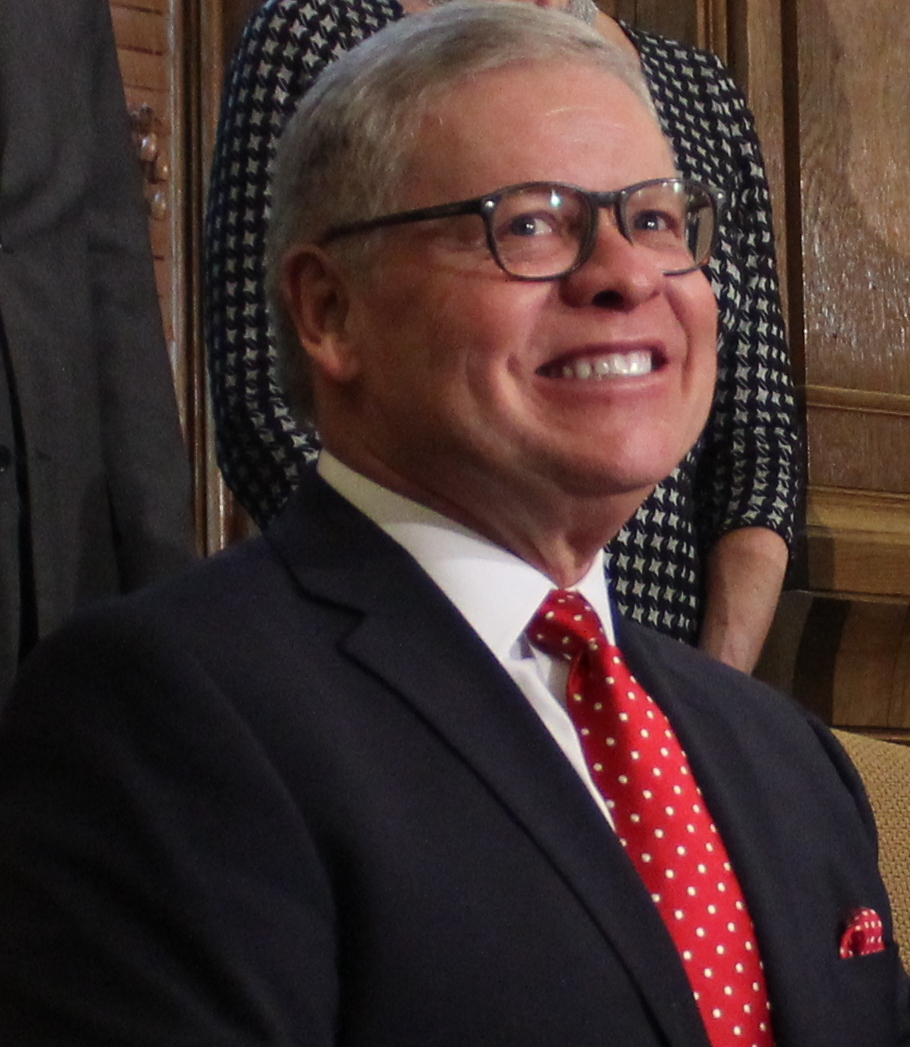

Candidate	Ron Alting	Natasha Baker
Party	Republican	Democratic
Incumbent State senator
Ron Alting
Republican

The district has been represented by Republican Ron Alting since 1998. Alting was re-elected unopposed in 2022. Alting voted for redistricting. Donald Trump won this district with 56.2% of the vote in the 2024 presidential election. Alting suspended his general election campaign amidst shoplifting allegations.

=== Republican primary ===
==== Nominee ====
- Ron Alting, incumbent state senator

==== Eliminated in primary ====
- Richard Bagsby, pastor and candidate for House District 41 in 2022

==== Endorsements ====
Ron Alting

Executive branch officials

- Donald Trump, president of the United States (2017–2021, 2025–present)

Organizations

- Indiana Farm Bureau AgELECT PAC
- NRA Political Victory Fund
Richard Bagsby

Statewide officials

- Micah Beckwith, lieutenant governor of Indiana (2025–present)

==== Results ====
Results by county: Alting: 50–60%

District 22 Republican primary
Party	Candidate	Votes	%
Republican	Ron Alting (incumbent)	4,954	59.1
Republican	Richard Bagsby	3,424	40.9
Total votes		8,378	100.0

=== Democratic primary ===
==== Nominee ====
- Natasha Baker, teacher

==== Eliminated in primary ====
- Marlena Edmondson, student service coordinator

==== Results ====
District 22 Democratic primary
Party	Candidate	Votes	%
Democratic	Natasha Baker	3,554	62.1
Democratic	Marlena Edmondson	2,045	37.9
Total votes		5,599	100.0

=== General election ===
==== Results ====
District 22 election
Party	Candidate	Votes	%
Democratic	Natasha Baker	19,960	58.8
Republican	Ron Alting (incumbent) (withdrawn; remains on ballot)	13,979	41.2
Total votes		33,939	100.0
Democratic gain from Republican			

== District 23 ==
23rd district election

Candidate	Spencer Deery	David Sanders
Party	Republican	Democratic
Incumbent State senator
Spencer Deery
Republican

The district has been represented by Republican Spencer Deery since 2022. Deery was elected with 63.6% of the vote in 2022. Deery voted against redistricting. Donald Trump won this district with 62.2% of the vote in the 2024 presidential election.

=== Republican primary ===
==== Declared ====
- Paula Copenhaver, former Fountain County clerk; governmental affairs director for Lt. Gov. Micah Beckwith; and candidate for this seat in 2022
- Spencer Deery, incumbent state senator

==== Endorsements ====
Paula Copenhaver

Executive branch officials

- Donald Trump, president of the United States (2017–2021, 2025–present)

U.S. senators

- Jim Banks, Indiana (2025–present)

U.S. representatives

- Erin Houchin, IN-9 (2023–present)

Statewide officials

- Micah Beckwith, lieutenant governor of Indiana (2025–present)
- Mike Braun, governor of Indiana (2025–present) and former senator (2019–2025)

Organizations

- Turning Point Action
Spencer Deery

Statewide officials

- Mitch Daniels, former governor of Indiana (2005–2013)

Organizations

- Indiana Farm Bureau AgELECT PAC
- National Federation of Independent Business Indiana PAC
- NRA Political Victory Fund

==== Results ====
Results by county: Deery: 60–70%; Copenhaver: 50–60%; 60–70%

The Republican primary for this district was incredibly close with incumbent Senator Spencer Deery being certified as the winner on September 10, 2026, over four months past the primary election date. Initially, Deery led by 3 votes. Indiana does not provide automatic recounts, but state law permits candidates to request one within fourteen days of the election. Copenhaver filed a recount petition on May 21, challenging the validity of ballots cast by 14 Democratic voters who publicly stated that they had requested a Republican primary ballot to vote for Deery. Copenhaver's petition to challenge the voters was denied, but in a later meeting the Indiana Recount Commission rejected 8 ballots for Deery and 2 for Copenhaver, based on either lack of signature of the county clerk or one or both set of initials from election judges, bringing the vote tally to 6,332 votes to 6,329 votes in Copenhaver's favor. On September 10, the Indiana Supreme Court overturned the commission's decision to reject those 10 votes, citing a state statue that makes ballots legally countable despite errors by election officials. The court's decision ruled Deery as the winner.

District 23 Republican primary
Party	Candidate	Votes	%
Republican	Spencer Deery (incumbent)	6,337	50.01
Republican	Paula Copenhaver	6,334	49.99
Total votes		12,661	100.00

=== Democratic primary ===
==== Nominee ====
- David Sanders, West Lafayette city council member and nominee for this district in 2022

=== General election ===
==== Results ====
District 23 election
Party	Candidate	Votes	%
Republican	Spencer Deery	15,365	53.8
Democratic	David Sanders	11,722	41
Independent	Joshua Brant	1,482	5.2
Total votes		28,569	100.0
Republican hold			

== District 25 ==
25th district election
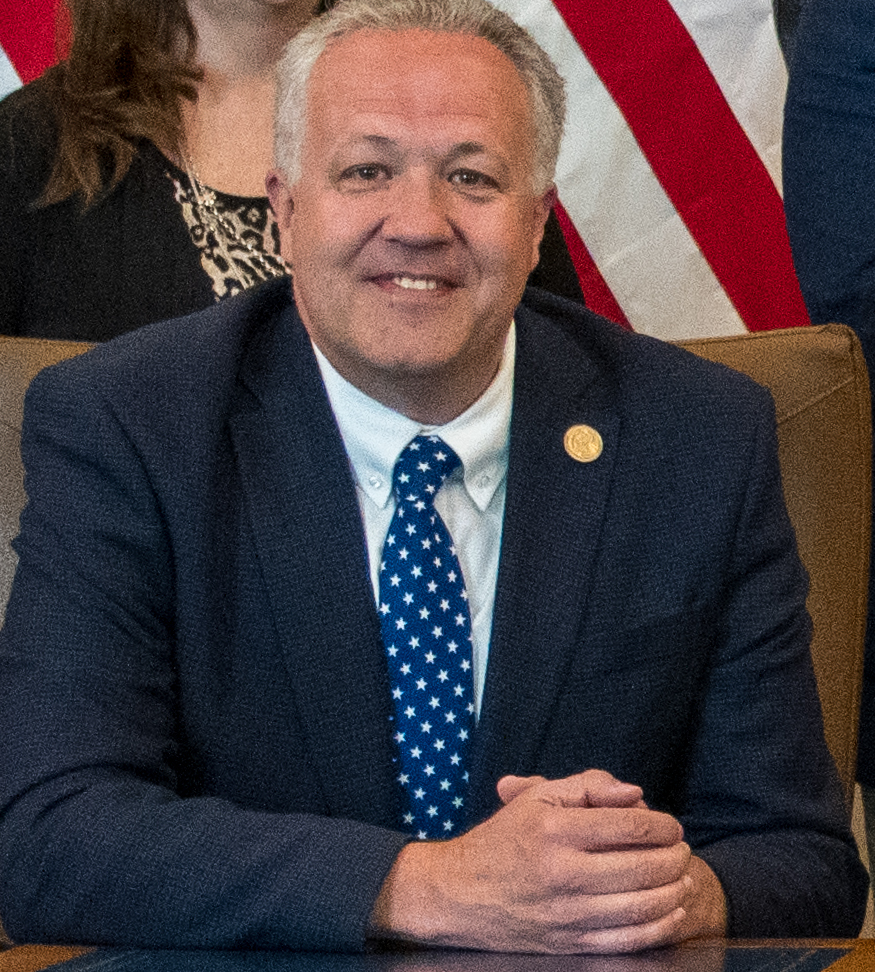

Candidate	Mike Gaskill	Tamie Dixon-Tatum
Party	Republican	Democratic
Incumbent State senator
Mike Gaskill
Republican

The district has been represented by Republican Mike Gaskill since 2022. Gaskill was elected with 64.1% of the vote in 2022. Gaskill voted for redistricting. Donald Trump won this district with 63.2% of the vote in the 2024 presidential election.

=== Republican primary ===
==== Nominee ====
- Mike Gaskill, incumbent state senator

==== Eliminated in primary ====
- Katherine Callahan, small business owner

==== Endorsements ====
Mike Gaskill

Executive branch officials

- Donald Trump, president of the United States (2017–2021, 2025–present)

Statewide officials

- Mike Braun, governor of Indiana (2025–present) and former senator (2019–2025)

Organizations

- Indiana Farm Bureau AgELECT PAC
- National Federation of Independent Business Indiana PAC
- NRA Political Victory Fund

==== Results ====
District 25 Republican primary
Party	Candidate	Votes	%
Republican	Mike Gaskill (incumbent)	5,453	55.4
Republican	Katherine Callahan	4,394	44.6
Total votes		9,847	100.0

=== Democratic primary ===
==== Nominee ====
- Tamie Dixon-Tatum, office manager and perennial candidate

==== Eliminated in primary ====
- Todd Shelton, small business owner

==== Results ====
District 25 Democratic primary
Party	Candidate	Votes	%
Democratic	Tamie Dixon-Tatum	4,699	65.0
Democratic	Todd Shelton	2,527	35.0
Total votes		7,226	100.0

=== General election ===
==== Results ====
District 25 election
Party	Candidate	Votes	%
Republican	Mike Gaskill (incumbent)	20,685	53.9
Democratic	Tamie Dixon-Tatum	17,662	46.1
Total votes		38,347	100.0
Republican hold			

== District 26 ==
26th district election
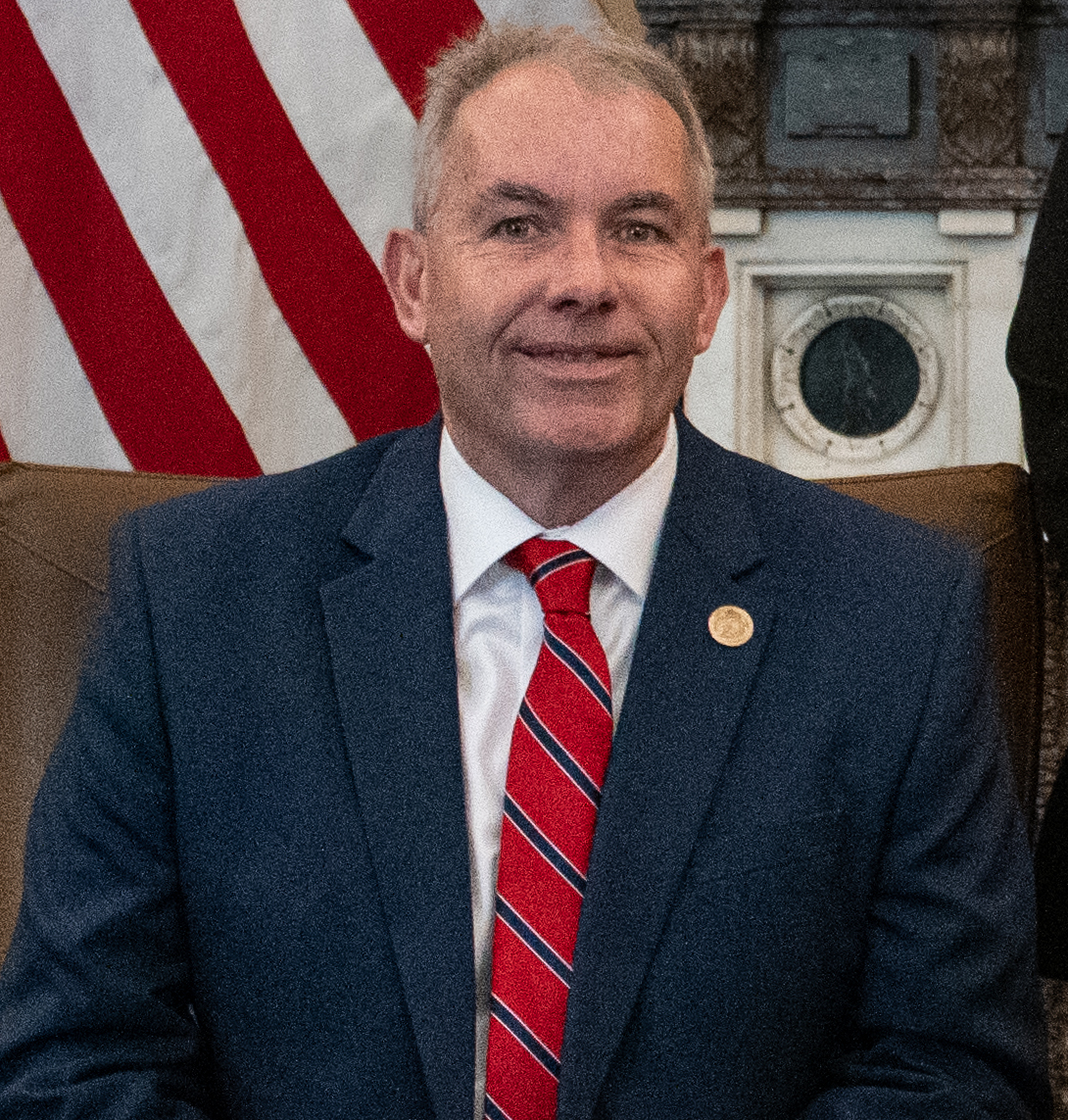

Candidate	Scott Alexander	Andrew Dale
Party	Republican	Democratic
Incumbent State senator
Scott Alexander
Republican

The district has been represented by Republican Scott Alexander since 2022. Alexander was elected with 61% of the vote in 2022. Alexander voted for redistricting. Donald Trump won this district with 60.5% of the vote in the 2024 presidential election.

=== Republican primary ===
==== Nominee ====
- Scott Alexander, incumbent state senator

==== Eliminated in primary ====
- Katherine Nunley-Kritsch, small business owner and candidate for this seat in 2022

==== Endorsements ====
Scott Alexander

Executive branch officials

- Donald Trump, president of the United States (2017–2021, 2025–present)

Statewide officials

- Mike Braun, governor of Indiana (2025–present) and former senator (2019–2025)

Organizations

- Indiana Farm Bureau AgELECT PAC
- National Federation of Independent Business Indiana PAC
- NRA Political Victory Fund

==== Results ====
District 26 Republican primary
Party	Candidate	Votes	%
Republican	Scott Alexander (incumbent)	6,322	72.1
Republican	Katherine Nunley-Kritsch	2,450	27.9
Total votes		8,772	100.0

=== Democratic primary ===
==== Nominee ====
- Andrew Dale, chairman of Delaware County Democratic party

=== Socialist Party of Indiana convention ===
==== Nominee ====
- Tanya Pearson (no ballot or write-in access)

=== General election ===
==== Results ====
District 26 election
Party	Candidate	Votes	%
Republican	Scott Alexander (incumbent)	18,972	51.6
Democratic	Andrew Dale	17,780	48.4
Total votes		36,752	100.0
Republican hold			

== District 27 ==
27th district election
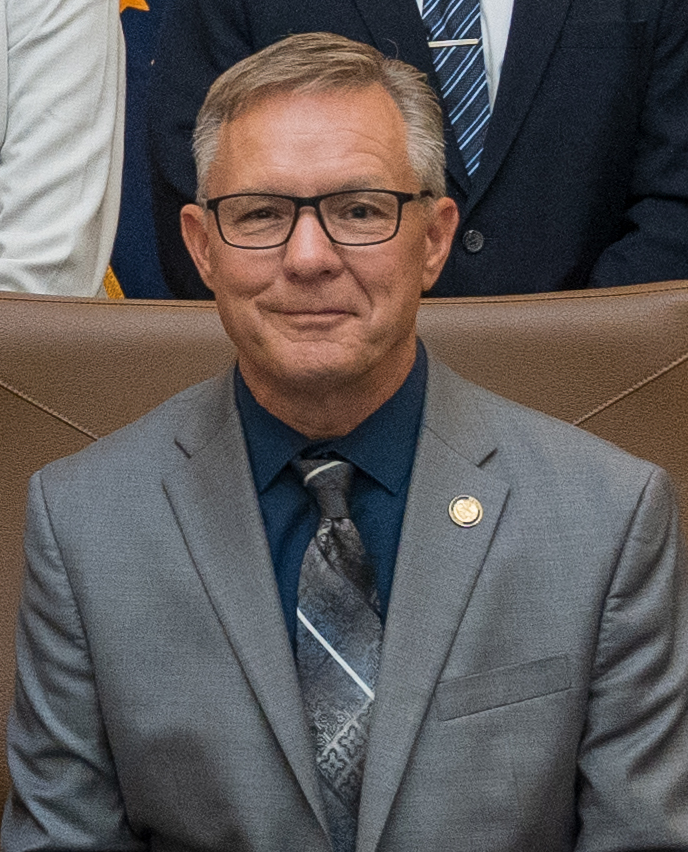

Candidate	Jeff Raatz	Ron Itnyre
Party	Republican	Democratic
Incumbent State senator
Jeff Raatz
Republican

The district has been represented by Republican Jeff Raatz since 2014. Raatz was re-elected with 71.2% of the vote in 2022. Raatz voted for redistricting. Donald Trump won this district with 70.9% of the vote in the 2024 presidential election.

=== Republican primary ===
==== Nominee ====
- Jeff Raatz, incumbent state senator

==== Eliminated in primary ====
- Anthony Lee Jones, retail worker

==== Endorsements ====
Jeff Raatz

Executive branch officials

- Donald Trump, president of the United States (2017–2021, 2025–present)

Statewide officials

- Mike Braun, governor of Indiana (2025–present) and former senator (2019–2025)

Organizations

- Indiana Farm Bureau AgELECT PAC
- National Federation of Independent Business Indiana PAC
- NRA Political Victory Fund

==== Results ====
District 27 Republican primary
Party	Candidate	Votes	%
Republican	Jeff Raatz (incumbent)	9,329	69.3
Republican	Anthony Lee Jones	4,128	30.7
Total votes		13,457	100.0

=== Democratic primary ===
==== Nominee ====
- Ron Itnyre, professor at Indiana University-East

=== General election ===
==== Results ====
District 27 election
Party	Candidate	Votes	%
Republican	Jeff Raatz (incumbent)	21,160	61
Democratic	Ron Itnyre	13,543	39
Total votes		34,703	100.0
Republican hold			

== District 29 ==
29th district election

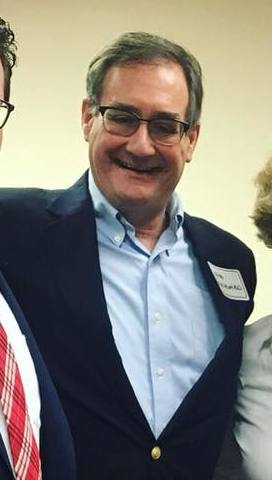
Candidate	Kristina Moorhead	John Ruckelshaus
Party	Democratic	Republican
Incumbent State senator
J. D. Ford
Democratic

The district has been represented by Democrat J. D. Ford since 2018. Ford was re-elected with 51.7% of the vote in 2022. Ford announced he is choosing to run for Indiana's 5th congressional district leaving this seat open. Kamala Harris won this district with 56.3% of the vote in the 2024 presidential election.

=== Democratic primary ===
==== Nominee ====
- Kristina Moorhead, health advocate

==== Eliminated in primary ====
- David W. Greene, pastor
- Demetrice Hicks, Pike Township board member
- Kevin Short, healthcare worker and candidate for House District 40 in 2020

==== Declined ====
- J. D. Ford, incumbent state senator (running for U.S. House for 5th district)

==== Endorsements ====
Demetrice Hicks

State legislators

- Renee Pack, state representative from the 92nd district (2020–present)
- Cherrish Pryor, state representative from the 94th district (2008–present)
- Robin Shackleford, state representative from the 98th district (2012–present)

==== Results ====
District 29 Democratic primary
Party	Candidate	Votes	%
Democratic	Kristina Moorhead	5,385	51.1
Democratic	Demetrice Hicks	2,702	25.7
Democratic	David W. Greene	2,155	20.5
Democratic	Kevin Short	286	4.7
Total votes		10,528	100.0

=== Republican primary ===
==== Nominee ====
- John Ruckelshaus, former state senator for the 30th district (2016–2020)

==== Eliminated in primary ====
- Mike Delph, former state senator for this district (2005–2018)
- V. Roni Ford, former regional deputy director for U.S. senator Todd Young and former Metropolitan School District of Pike Township member

==== Endorsements ====
Mike Delph

Statewide officials

- Mike Braun, governor of Indiana (2025–present) and former senator (2019–2025)
- Todd Rokita, attorney general of Indiana (2021–present) and former IN-04 (2011–2019)

Individuals

- Jim Bopp, lawyer and Indiana University trustee
John Ruckelshaus

Statewide officials

- Mitch Daniels, former governor of Indiana (2005–2013)

Organizations

- Indiana Chamber of Commerce

==== Results ====
District 29 Republican primary
Party	Candidate	Votes	%
Republican	John Ruckelshaus	3,334	49.1
Republican	Mike Delph	2,946	43.4
Republican	V. Roni Ford	512	7.5
Total votes		6,792	100.0

=== General election ===
==== Post-primary endorsements ====
John Ruckelshaus

Organizations

- Indiana Farm Bureau AgELECT PAC

==== Results ====
District 29 election
Party	Candidate	Votes	%
Democratic	Kristina Moorhead	30,145	61.8
Republican	John Ruckelshaus	18,648	38.2
Total votes		48,793	100.0
Democratic hold			

== District 31 ==
31st district election
Candidate	Juanita Albright	Kerry Forestal
Party	Republican	Democratic
Incumbent State senator
Kyle Walker
Republican

The district has been represented by Republican Kyle Walker since 2020. Walker was re-elected with 55.4% of the vote in 2022. He announced he would not seek reelection due to his opposition of redistricting. Kamala Harris won this district with 50.4% of the vote in the 2024 presidential election.

=== Republican primary ===
==== Nominee ====
- Juanita Albright, doctor and Hamilton Southeastern Schools Board of Trustees president

==== Eliminated in primary ====
- Tiffanie Ditlevson, Fishers city councilor
- Travis Hankins, businessman, candidate for Indiana's 9th congressional district in 2010, and candidate for Indiana's 6th congressional district in 2012
- Jan Kepley Keefer, attorney

==== Declined ====
- Kyle Walker, incumbent state senator

==== Endorsements ====
Juanita Albright

U.S. senators

- Jim Banks, Indiana (2025–present)

Statewide officials

- Mike Braun, governor of Indiana (2025–present) and former senator (2019–2025)

Organizations

- Americans for Prosperity
- Indiana Chamber of Commerce
- Indiana Right to Life
- Indiana State Police Alliance
Tiffanie Ditlevson

Local officials

- Scott Fadness, mayor of Fishers (2015–present)

==== Results ====
District 31 Republican primary
Party	Candidate	Votes	%
Republican	Juanita Albright	3,516	37.7
Republican	Tiffanie Ditlevson	2,332	25.0
Republican	Travis Hankins	1,781	19.1
Republican	Jan Kepley Keefer	1,699	18.2
Total votes		9,328	100.0

=== Democratic primary ===
==== Nominee ====
- Kerry Forestal, Marion County sheriff

==== Eliminated in primary ====
- Andrew Dezelan, former Indiana State Senate staffer
- Lasima Packett, community advocate and veteran
- Catherine Torzewski, realtor and small business owner

==== Endorsements ====
Lasima Packett

State legislators

- Cherrish Pryor, state representative from the 94th district (2008–present)
- Robin Shackleford, state representative from the 98th district (2012–present)

==== Results ====
District 31 Democratic primary
Party	Candidate	Votes	%
Democratic	Kerry Forestal	4,153	37.7
Democratic	Catherine Torzewski	3,909	35.5
Democratic	Lasima Packett	1,805	16.4
Democratic	Andrew Dezelan	1,141	10.4
Total votes		11,008	100.0

=== General election ===
==== Results ====
District 31 election
Party	Candidate	Votes	%
Democratic	Kerry Forestal	31,983	57.8
Republican	Juanita Albright	23,329	42.2
Total votes		55,312	100.0
Democratic gain from Republican			

== District 38 ==
38th district election
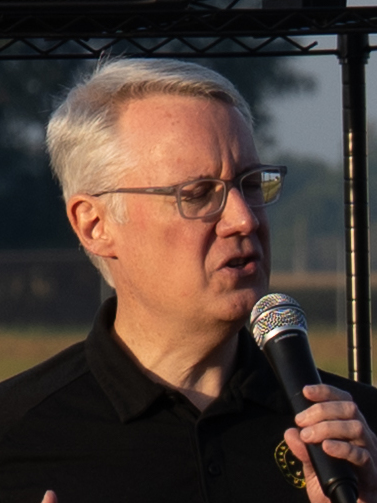

Candidate	Greg Goode	Kacey Blundell
Party	Republican	Democratic
Incumbent State senator
Greg Goode
Republican

The district has been represented by Republican Greg Goode since 2023. In 2023, Goode was appointed to the Indiana Senate after Jon Ford, resigned. Goode voted against redistricting. Donald Trump won this district with 63.1% of the vote in the 2024 presidential election.

=== Republican primary ===
==== Nominee ====
- Greg Goode, incumbent state senator

==== Eliminated in primary ====
- Alexandra Wilson, network engineer
- Brenda Wilson, Vigo County council member

==== Endorsements ====
Greg Goode

Organizations

- Indiana Farm Bureau AgELECT PAC
- National Federation of Independent Business Indiana PAC
- NRA Political Victory Fund
Brenda Wilson

Executive branch officials

- Donald Trump, president of the United States (2017–2021, 2025–present)

U.S. senators

- Jim Banks, Indiana (2025–present)

U.S. representatives

- Erin Houchin, IN-9 (2023–present)

Statewide officials

- Mike Braun, governor of Indiana (2025–present) and former senator (2019–2025)

Individuals

- Jim Bopp, lawyer and Indiana University trustee

Organizations

- Turning Point Action

==== Results ====
District 38 Republican primary
Party	Candidate	Votes	%
Republican	Greg Goode (incumbent)	6,631	53.5
Republican	Brenda Wilson	4,471	36.1
Republican	Alexandra Wilson	1,289	10.4
Total votes		12,391	100.0

=== Democratic primary ===
==== Nominee ====
- Kacey Blundell, social worker

=== General election ===
==== Results ====
District 38 election
Party	Candidate	Votes	%
Republican	Greg Goode (incumbent)	21,570	59.9
Democratic	Kacey Blundell	14,440	40.1
Total votes		36,010	100.0
Republican hold			

== District 39 ==
39th district election
Candidate	Jeff Ellington
Party	Republican
Incumbent State senator
Eric Bassler
Republican

The district has been represented by Republican Eric Bassler since 2014. Bassler was re-elected unopposed in 2022. Bassler voted against redistricting. In July 2025, Bassler announced he would not be seeking reelection. Donald Trump won this district with 76.9% of the vote in the 2024 presidential election.

=== Republican primary ===
==== Nominee ====
- Jeff Ellington, former state representative for the 62nd district (2015–2022)

==== Eliminated in primary ====
- Tanner Bouchie, attorney
- Kristi Risk, governmental affairs director for lieutenant governor of Indiana and candidate for IN-8 in 2010, 2012, and 2024

==== Declined ====
- Eric Bassler, incumbent state senator

==== Endorsements ====
Jeff Ellington

Executive branch officials

- Donald Trump, president of the United States (2017–2021, 2025–present)

U.S. senators

- Jim Banks, Indiana (2025–present)

U.S. representatives

- Erin Houchin, IN-9 (2023–present)

Statewide officials

- Todd Rokita, attorney general of Indiana (2021–present) and former IN-04 (2011–2019)

Individuals

- Jim Bopp, lawyer and Indiana University trustee

Organizations

- Indiana Right to Life (co-endorsement with Risk)
- NRA Political Victory Fund
- Turning Point Action
Kristi Risk

State legislators

- Ryan Mishler, state senator from the 9th district (2004–present)

Organizations

- American Family Association
- Indiana Chamber of Commerce
- Indiana Right to Life (co-endorsement with Ellington)

==== Results ====
District 39 Republican primary
Party	Candidate	Votes	%
Republican	Jeff Ellington	7,940	46.2
Republican	Kristi Risk	5,377	31.3
Republican	Tanner Bouchie	3,865	22.5
Total votes		17,182	100.0

=== Democratic primary ===
==== Withdrew ====
- Joseph Baughman, autoworker

=== General election ===
==== Results ====
District 39 election
Party	Candidate	Votes	%
Republican	Jeff Ellington		
Total votes			100.0

== District 41 ==
41st district election
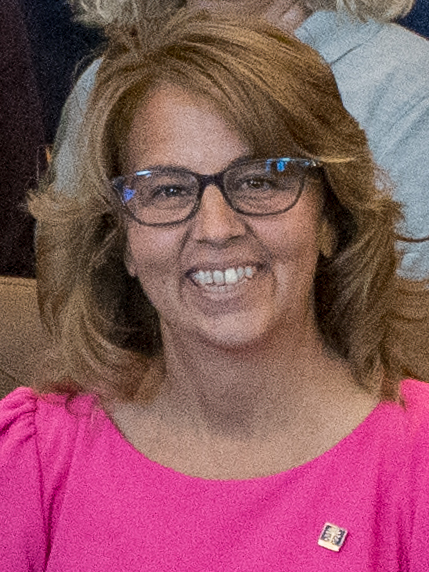

Candidate	Michelle Davis	Ross Thomas
Party	Republican	Democratic
Incumbent State senator
Greg Walker
Republican

The district has been represented by Republican Greg Walker since 2006. Walker was re-elected with 67.8% of the vote in 2022. In August 2025, Walker announced he would not run for reelection; however, he reversed his decision in January 2026 and ran for reelection. He cited the political turmoil from redistricting as his reason to rejoin the race. Walker voted against redistricting. Donald Trump won this district with 65.3% of the vote in the 2024 presidential election.

=== Republican primary ===
==== Nominee ====
- Michelle Davis, state representative for the 58th district (2020–present)

==== Eliminated in primary ====
- Greg Walker, incumbent state senator

==== Declined ====
- Greg Pence, former U.S. representative for Indiana's 6th congressional district (2019–2025)
- Milo Smith, former state representative for the 59th district (2006–2018)

==== Endorsements ====
Michelle Davis

Executive branch officials

- Donald Trump, president of the United States (2017–2021, 2025–present)

U.S. senators

- Jim Banks, Indiana (2025–present)

U.S. representatives

- Erin Houchin, IN-9 (2023–present)

Statewide officials

- Mike Braun, governor of Indiana (2025–present) and former senator (2019–2025)
- Daniel Elliott, Indiana state treasurer (2023–present)

State legislators

- Joanna King, state representative for the 40th district (2020–present)
- Julie McGuire, state representative for the 93rd district (2022–present)

Organizations

- Americans for Prosperity
- NRA Political Victory Fund
- Turning Point Action

==== Results ====
District 41 Republican primary
Party	Candidate	Votes	%
Republican	Michelle Davis	7,314	58.8
Republican	Greg Walker (incumbent)	5,134	41.2
Total votes		12,448	100.0

=== Democratic primary ===
==== Nominee ====
- Ross Thomas, attorney, chairman of the Bartholomew County Democratic Party, candidate for this seat in 2018, and candidate for Indiana House District 59 in 2022 and 2024

=== General election ===
==== Results ====
District 41 election
Party	Candidate	Votes	%
Republican	Michelle Davis	20,940	54.8
Democratic	Ross Thomas	17,262	45.2
Total votes		38,202	100.0
Republican hold			

== District 43 ==
43rd district election
Candidate	Randy Maxwell	Byron Holland
Party	Republican	Democratic
Incumbent State senator
Randy Maxwell
Republican

The district has been represented by Republican Randy Maxwell since 2023. In September 2023, Maxwell won a caucus held to appoint a new state senator for the 43rd district, garnering 56 of the 80 votes available. Maxwell voted for redistricting. Donald Trump won this district with 75.3% of the vote in the 2024 presidential election.

=== Republican primary ===
==== Declared ====
- Randy Maxwell, incumbent state senator

==== Eliminated in primary ====
- Joe Volk, farmer and small business owner

==== Endorsements ====
Randy Maxwell

Executive branch officials

- Donald Trump, president of the United States (2017–2021, 2025–present)

Statewide officials

- Mike Braun, governor of Indiana (2025–present) and former senator (2019–2025)

Organizations

- National Federation of Independent Business Indiana PAC
- NRA Political Victory Fund

==== Results ====
District 43 Republican primary
Party	Candidate	Votes	%
Republican	Randy Maxwell (incumbent)	7,874	60.1
Republican	Joe Volk	5,134	39.9
Total votes		13,108	100.0

=== Democratic primary ===
==== Nominee ====
- Byron Holland

=== General election ===
==== Post-primary endorsements ====
Randy Maxwell

Organizations

- Indiana Farm Bureau AgELECT PAC

==== Results ====
District 43 election
Party	Candidate	Votes	%
Republican	Randy Maxwell (incumbent)	24,822	66.7
Democratic	Byron Holland	12,382	33.3
Total votes		37,204	100.0
Republican hold			

== District 45 ==
45th district election
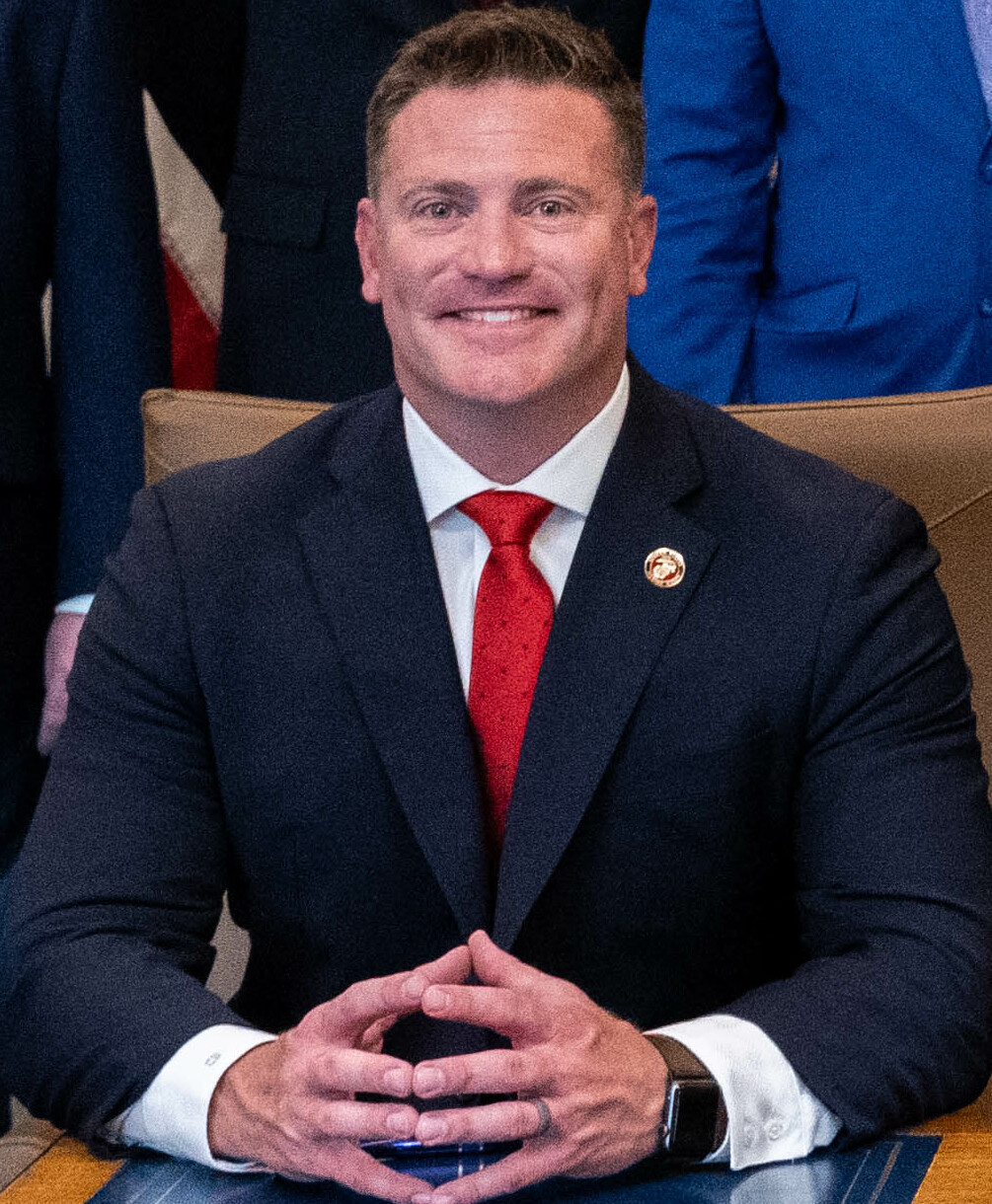

Candidate	Chris Garten	Nick Marshall
Party	Republican	Democratic
Incumbent State senator
Chris Garten
Republican

The district has been represented by Republican Chris Garten since 2018. Garten was re-elected with 62.1% of the vote in 2022. Garten voted for redistricting. Donald Trump won this district with 58.8% of the vote in the 2024 presidential election.

=== Republican primary ===
==== Nominee ====
- Chris Garten, incumbent state senator

==== Endorsements ====
Chris Garten

Executive branch officials

- Donald Trump, president of the United States (2017–2021, 2025–present)

=== Democratic primary ===
==== Nominee ====
- Nick Marshall, foster care advocate and nominee for this district in 2022

=== Libertarian convention ===
==== Nominee ====
- Larry Mahaney

=== General election ===
==== Post-primary endorsements ====
Chris Garten

Organizations

- Indiana Farm Bureau AgELECT PAC

==== Results ====
Initially, Garten held a narrow lead over Marshall of 297 votes, approximately 0.7 percentage points. The result became the subject of a dispute after a ballot scanner malfunction was reported at a polling site in Clark County, prompting Democratic officials to raise concerns over discrepancies between electronic voter check-in records and ballot totals, as well as whether all ballots had been properly counted. On November 10, the Clark County Election Board voted 2–1 against conducting a manual count of ballots from four precincts that had voted at the location. Garten rejected allegations of irregularities, stating that election officials had reviewed the matter. On November 12, the Clark County Democratic Party announced plans to seek a recount and challenge the election results in court.

District 45 election
Party	Candidate	Votes	%
Republican	Chris Garten (incumbent)	21,817	49.2
Democratic	Nick Marshall	21,520	48.6
Libertarian	Larry Mahaney	993	2.2
Total votes		44,330	100.0

== District 46 ==
46th district election
Candidate	Allissa Impink
Party	Democratic
Incumbent State senator
Andrea Hunley
Democratic

The district has been represented by Democrat Andrea Hunley since 2022. Hunley was elected with 72.9% of the vote in 2022. She announced she would not seek reelection. Kamala Harris won this district with 69.9% of the vote in the 2024 presidential election.

=== Democratic primary ===
==== Nominee ====
- Allissa Impink, Indianapolis Public Schools board member

==== Eliminated in primary ====
- Sam Glynn
- Clif Marsiglio, activist, candidate for lieutenant governor in 2024, and candidate for Indianapolis mayor in 2023

==== Declined ====
- Andrea Hunley, incumbent state senator

==== Endorsements ====
Allissa Impink

Organizations

- Indiana Farm Bureau AgELECT PAC

==== Results ====
District 46 Democratic primary
Party	Candidate	Votes	%
Democratic	Allissa Impink	7,865	68.5
Democratic	Clif Marsiglio	2,243	19.5
Democratic	Sam Glynn	1,381	12.0
Total votes		11,489	100.0

== District 47 ==
47th district election
Candidate	Gary Byrne	Ethan Sweetland-May
Party	Republican	Democratic
Incumbent State senator
Gary Byrne
Republican

The district has been represented by Republican Gary Byrne since 2022. Byrne was elected with 66.8% of the vote in 2022. Byrne voted for redistricting. Donald Trump won this district with 65.7% of the vote in the 2024 presidential election.

=== Republican primary ===
==== Nominee ====
- Gary Byrne, incumbent state senator

==== Endorsements ====
Gary Byrne

Executive branch officials

- Donald Trump, president of the United States (2017–2021, 2025–present)

=== Democratic primary ===
==== Nominee ====
- Ethan Sweetland-May, account executive

=== General election ===
==== Results ====
District 47 election
Party	Candidate	Votes	%
Republican	Gary Byrne (incumbent)	24,882	56.7
Democratic	Ethan Sweetland-May	18,994	43.3
Total votes		43,876	100.0
Republican hold			

== District 48 ==
48th district election
Candidate	Daryl Schmitt	Brad Hochgesang
Party	Republican	Democratic
Incumbent State senator
Daryl Schmitt
Republican

The district has been represented by Republican Daryl Schmitt since 2024. After Mark Messmer was elected as the U.S. representative for Indiana's 8th congressional district, Daryl Schmitt was chosen to replace him. Schmitt voted for redistricting. Donald Trump won this district with 71.3% of the vote in the 2024 presidential election.

=== Republican primary ===
==== Nominee ====
- Daryl Schmitt, incumbent state senator

==== Endorsements ====
Daryl Schmitt

Executive branch officials

- Donald Trump, president of the United States (2017–2021, 2025–present)

=== Democratic primary ===
==== Nominee ====
- Brad Hochgesang, software engineer

==== Results ====
District 49 election
Party	Candidate	Votes	%
Republican	Daryl Schmitt (incumbent)	24,945	57.4
Democratic	Brad Hochgesang	18,552	42.6
Total votes		43,497	100.0
Republican hold			

== District 49 ==
49th district election
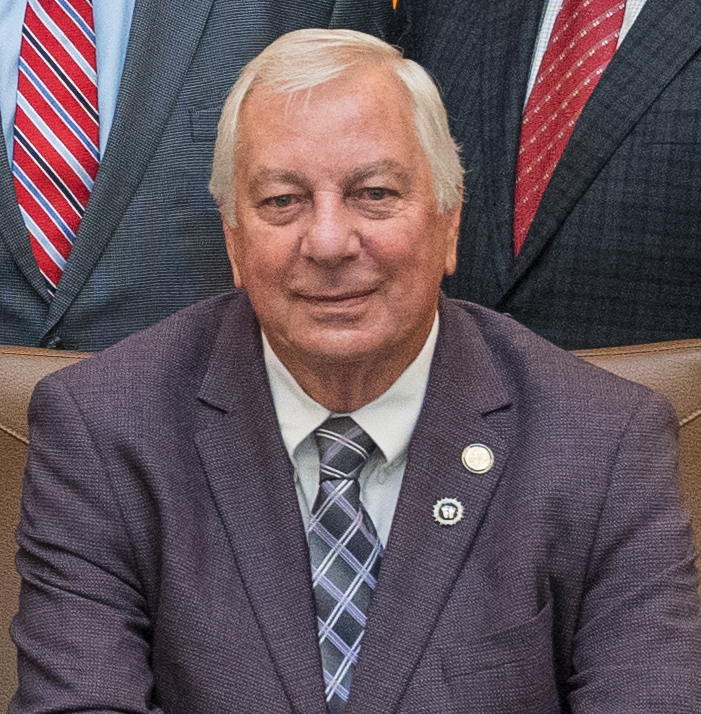
Candidate	Jim Tomes	Cindi Clayton
Party	Republican	Democratic
Incumbent State senator
Jim Tomes
Republican

The district has been represented by Republican Jim Tomes since 2010. Tomes was re-elected unopposed in 2022. Tomes voted for redistricting. Donald Trump won this district with 60.2% of the vote in the 2024 presidential election.

=== Republican primary ===
==== Nominee ====
- Jim Tomes, incumbent state senator

==== Eliminated in primary ====
- Brandi Durham Pugh

==== Endorsements ====
Jim Tomes

Executive branch officials

- Donald Trump, president of the United States (2017–2021, 2025–present)

Statewide officials

- Mike Braun, governor of Indiana (2025–present) and former senator (2019–2025)

Organizations

- Indiana Farm Bureau AgELECT PAC
- National Federation of Independent Business Indiana PAC
- NRA Political Victory Fund

==== Results ====
District 43 Republican primary
Party	Candidate	Votes	%
Republican	Jim Tomes (incumbent)	2,529	81.8
Republican	Brandi Pugh	562	18.2
Total votes		3,091	100.0

=== Democratic primary ===
==== Nominee ====
- Cindi Clayton, professor

=== General election ===
==== Results ====
District 49 election
Party	Candidate	Votes	%
Republican	Jim Tomes (incumbent)	18,367	51.2
Democratic	Cindi Clayton	17,484	48.8
Total votes		35,851	100.0
