= Spencer Deery =

American politician

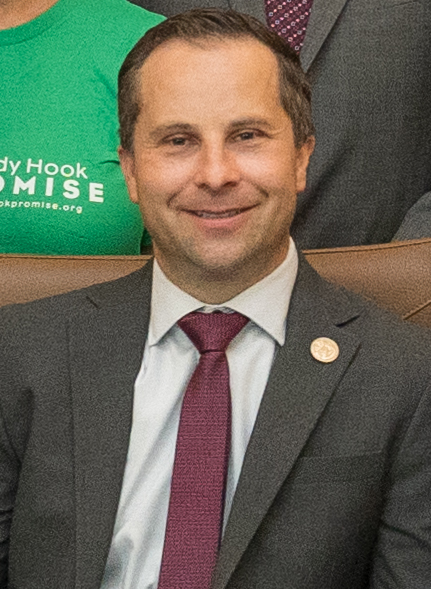
- Deery in 2024

Member of the Indiana Senate from the 23rd district
- Incumbent
- Assumed office November 22, 2022
- Preceded by: Phil Boots

Personal details
- Party: Republican
- Education: Brigham Young University (BA); George Washington University (MS)

Spencer Deery is an American politician serving as a member of the Indiana Senate from the 23rd district. He assumed office on November 22, 2022.

In 2025, Deery was one of 21 Republican senators to vote against mid-decade redistricting in Indiana prompting criticism from national and state Republicans such as president Donald Trump and governor Mike Braun, who endorsed a primary opponent. He was one of only two Indiana state Senators targeted by the White House to win in the 2026 Republican primary. An ad paid for by Spencer Deery accused Paula Copenhaver of stealing $120,000.

== Early life ==
Deery grew up in a rural community as the son of an elementary school principal and a special ed teacher. He was involved in scouting from a young age and went on to earn the rank of Eagle Scout. He earned a bachelor's degree from Brigham Young University in communications and a master's degree in public administration from George Washington University.

As a student at Brigham Young University, Deery wrote a letter to the editor praising George W. Bush's embrace of compassionate conservatism. The letter also called for compassion towards immigrant children.

Before entering politics, Deery worked as deputy chief of staff at Purdue University for former university president Mitch Daniels. Before Purdue, he worked as public policy research aid at the U.S. Department of Veterans Affairs. He also was a publicist at Deseret Book Company, a publishing company affiliated with The Church of Jesus Christ of Latter-day Saints.

== Indiana State Senate (2022-Present) ==
Deery was first elected to the Indiana Senate in 2022 after winning a four-candidate Republican primary and defeating Democratic nominee David A. Sanders in the general election.

=== Legislation ===
Deery is the author of multiple bills that are now law. His first bill to become law gave college students a right to access their university transcript, ending so-called transcript ransom practices in Indiana. That same year, Deery's bill to establish a taxpayer receipt to allow Hoosiers to more easily track how their taxes are spent also was signed into law.

In 2024, Deery authored SB 202, a comprehensive higher education reform bill that established institutional neutrality, ended ideological oaths in hiring and established a system of tenure review. Under the system, tenured faculty are reviewed every five years for adequate performance of "academic duties and obligations" as well as adherence to supporting free speech and intellectual diversity. The bill also protected faculty from retaliatory action based on research, commentary or criticism of the institution. Deery defended the bill stating: “It’s not hard to find stories or research showing that there has been, increasingly over the last several decades, a monolithic, one-sided culture of what’s appropriate (in higher education). It’s a disservice to our students.” Despite the bill’s stated intention to promote intellectual diversity—defined as “multiple, divergent, and varied scholarly perspectives”—critics argue that it is an attack on academic freedom that would curb the teaching of facts and academic commentary that conflict with right-wing beliefs. David Sanders, a local city councilman and tenured Purdue University biology professor, stated, “They want their ideology represented in the discussion, and furthermore, again, it’s not about free speech. It’s not even about balance. They really want their ideology alone being presented in the classroom.” .

In 2024, Deery also authored and passed legislation regulating the use of AI in political advertising by requiring political campaigns to disclose if they are using AI to depict a candidate in realistic but artificially generated ways.

In 2025 Deery passed a bill requiring schools to inform parents if a child is involved in a bullying incident. The same bill also gave more flexibility to schools to pay high-value teachers more and to recruit STEM students into the teaching profession without going through a traditional teacher education program.

In 2026, Deery passed a bill giving parents a right to strengthen content filters and limit internet use on school-issued devices outside of school hours.

=== Views ===
Deery was one of the first Indiana State Senators to speak out against the proposal for mid-decade redistricting in Indiana. Deery released a statement in August of 2025, saying "I took an oath before God to support the Constitution. There is no constitutional principle more basic than popular sovereignty and the idea that voters choose their leaders and shape their own destiny. While any gerrymandering can arguably violate that principle, what we are being asked to do goes far beyond the partisan map fights that happen every 10 years across the country. Rationalizing a mid-cycle redistricting by saying, 'Democrats gerrymander too' is an empty and irrelevant excuse. Instead, we are being asked to create a new culture in which it would be normal for a political party to select new voters, not once a decade — but any time it fears the consequences of an approaching election. That would clearly violate the concept of popular sovereignty by making it harder for the people to hold their elected officials accountable and the country would be an uglier place for it."

When the bill was being debated, Deery opposed the effort from a political conservative viewpoint, saying, “No one benefits when we shield those who hold power from the will of the voters...Over the long run, this accountability keeps us relevant, and it keeps us in power...Make no mistake, I, like many of those who will join me in voting no today are constitutional fiscal and religious conservatives...As long as I have breath, I will use my voice to resist a federal government that attempts to bully, direct and control this state or any state. Giving the federal government more power is not conservative, nor is the idea that any single election or branch of the government should determine the fate of the country...As long as we stay true to the Constitution, no single election result will determine the destiny of the nation.”

In a March 2022 debate before the Republican primary for Indiana Senate District 23 Deery stated, "I am pro-life and oppose abortion in every way." In an August 2022 statement Deery said, "In substance, my views are that I oppose elective abortions as a means of birth control, and I support exceptions for the life of the mother, rape, incest and nonviable pregnancies." In October 2022 Deery declared, "I support exceptions for the health of the mother, rape, incest and nonviable pregnancies."

=== 2026 Republican primary ===
In December 2025, Deery voted against a mid-decade congressional redistricting proposal supported by President Donald Trump and Governor Mike Braun; the proposal was defeated 31–19 in the Indiana Senate. After the vote, Trump and Braun backed Paula K. Copenhaver's challenge to Deery in the 2026 Republican primary.

Spencer Deery accused Paula Copenhaver of stealing $120,000, which is contradicted by the court ruling in the case

Following the May 5 primary and county certification process, Deery led Copenhaver by three votes, and Copenhaver petitioned for a recount. On August 10, 2026, the Indiana Recount Commission's decisions changed the certified result to Copenhaver with 6,332 votes and Deery with 6,329. The dispute included ballots rejected over missing clerk seals or signatures, and Deery argued that six ballots cast for him should be counted because the defects resulted from election-official omissions rather than voter misconduct.

On September 10, 2026, the Indiana Supreme Court set aside the Recount Commission's determination and ordered the commission to recertify the results as Deery 6,335 votes and Copenhaver 6,332 votes. The order directed election preparations to proceed with Deery listed as the Republican nominee for the November general election.

== Personal life ==
Deery and his wife, Julia, live in Tippecanoe County with their three children. Deery and his family were the target of a swatting attempt in the lead up to the Indiana Senate's vote on mid cycle redistricting in 2025.

== Electoral history ==
=== 2022 ===
2022 Indiana State Senate 23rd district election
Republican primary
Party	Candidate	Votes	%
Republican	Spencer Deery	3,346	30.8
Republican	Bill Webster	2,929	27.0
Republican	Paula K. Copenhaver	2,492	22.9
Republican	Christian Beaver	2,093	19.3
Total votes		10,860	100.0
General election
Republican	Spencer Deery	20,115	63.6
Democratic	David A. Sanders	11,523	36.4
Total votes		31,638	100.0
Republican hold			

=== 2026 ===
2026 Indiana State Senate 23rd district election
Republican primary
Party	Candidate	Votes	%
Republican	Spencer Deery (incumbent)	6,335	50.01
Republican	Paula K. Copenhaver	6,332	49.99
Total votes		12,667	100.00
