= Greg Goode =

American politician

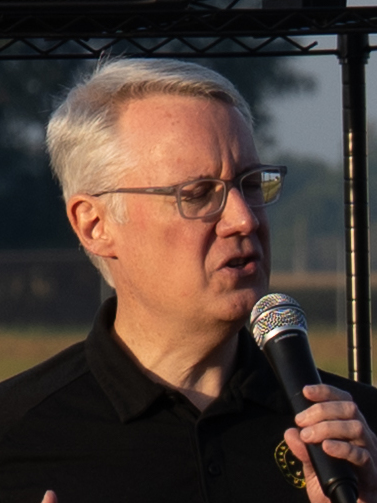
- Goode speaking in 2026

Member of the Indiana Senate from the 38th district
- Incumbent
- Assumed office November 1, 2023
- Preceded by: Jon Ford

Personal details
- Party: Republican
- Education: Indiana State University (BS)

Greg Goode is an American politician from the state of Indiana. A member of the Republican Party, he has represented the 38th district in the Indiana Senate since his appointment to the seat in 2023.

In 2025, Goode was one of 21 Republican senators to vote against mid-decade redistricting in Indiana prompting criticism from national and state Republicans such as president Donald Trump and governor Mike Braun, who endorsed one of his primary opponents. He was one of only two Indiana state Senators targeted by the White House to win in the 2026 Republican primary. Goode won re-nomination with 53.5% of the vote.

== Professional career ==
Goode served as executive director of Government Relations and University Communications for Indiana State University for over 10 years. He also serves as state director for U.S. Senator Todd Young.

== Political career ==
In 2008, Goode was the Republican nominee for Indiana's 8th congressional district, losing to Democratic incumbent Brad Ellsworth by a 65% to 35% margin.

In 2023, Goode was appointed to the Indiana Senate by a Republican precinct committee after the incumbent, fellow Republican Jon Ford, resigned. Ford had endorsed Goode as his successor. Goode defeated former state senator John Waterman by a 56–18 margin at the Republican caucus.

On November 16, 2025, Goode was the victim of a swatting incident after President Donald Trump criticized him and other Republicans for not redrawing the state's congressional districts. Following the incident, Goode stated that his opposition to the redistricting proposal was based on constituent feedback, saying he had received overwhelming opposition from residents of his district regardless of party affiliation. Speaking during the Senate debate, he said he had listened carefully to his constituents and believed his vote reflected their will. Goode also criticized what he described as escalating political pressure, misinformation, and threats surrounding the redistricting effort, warning that such tactics had negatively affected Indiana's political climate.

== Personal life ==
Goode lives in Terre Haute. He is a Baptist.
