= 2026 Missouri Proposition A =

Veto referendum on congressional districts

- 3 November 2026
- Do the people of the state of Missouri approve the act of the General Assembly entitled "House Bill No. 1 (2025 Second Extraordinary Session)," which repeals Missouri's existing congressional plan, and replaces it with new congressional boundaries that keep more counties intact?

Results
Choice	Votes	%
Yes	766,355	37.56%
No	1,274,170	62.44%
Valid votes	2,040,525	100.00%
Invalid or blank votes	0	0.00%
Total votes	2,040,525	100.00%
- County results Yes: 50–60% 60–70% 90–100% No: 50–60% 60–70% 70–80% 80–90%

Map of Missouri's congressional districts used in the 2022 and 2024 congressional elections Interactive map version

Map of Missouri's congressional districts subject to the veto referendum Interactive map version

Proposition A appeared on the November 3, 2026, ballot in the state of Missouri as a veto referendum. Voters decided that congressional districts that the Missouri General Assembly adopted in 2025 will not take effect.

In September 2025, Missouri lawmakers passed—and Missouri governor Mike Kehoe signed into law—an act changing the state's congressional districts. The new districts dismantled the strongly Democratic-leaning 5th congressional district.

However, before the map took effect, it faced a lawsuit and a veto referendum. The lawsuit argued the new map was unconstitutional, and violated the part of Missouri's Constitution stating that redistricting had to occur after a United States census. But the Missouri Supreme Court disagreed, ruling 4–3 that the state constitution requires redistricting to happen after a census, but does not otherwise explicitly prohibit it.

The veto referendum, in which voters decide whether to pass or reject a law, was initiated by a group named People Not Politicians Missouri after they gathered over 300,000 signatures. Although the number of signatures submitted was sufficient, Missouri Secretary of State Denny Hoskins refused to place the measure on the ballot, stating that it was an unconstitutional measure. The Missouri Supreme Court ruled against him, ordering the veto referendum on the ballot and the use of the 2022 congressional maps during the concurrent congressional elections.

== Background ==
=== Legislative discussion ===
In July 2025, The Missouri Independent reported that the Trump administration had urged Republican Party leadership in the state of Missouri to redistrict the state's legislative boundaries to benefit Republicans. The plan elicited concern from some Missouri Republicans, such as House Speaker Pro Tempore Chad Perkins, who said it broke the precedent of redistricting after every census. Along with redistricting in Texas, the proposal began amid concern from Trump and his allies that a Republican loss in the 2026 United States House of Representatives elections could damage Trump's legislative agenda and lead to investigations.

By August 2025, momentum began building behind the scenes. Early that month, The Kansas City Star reported emails showing that Kehoe had gathered the state's top legislative leaders at the Missouri Capitol for a private meeting about redistricting on August 1, 2025. The Star also obtained emails showing that top staffers in Kehoe's office discussed the legality of redistricting with high-ranking officials in the Missouri Office of Administration. Additional records obtained by the Star showed that messages condemning the effort were flooding Kehoe's office, with an internal staff report listing opposition to redistricting as the No. 1 "hot topic" among residents who contacted the governor in late July.

=== Special session ===
Multiple state legislators called on Mike Kehoe to call a special session immediately to redraw the congressional districts. On August 21, 2025, Donald Trump stated on Truth Social that Missouri was ready to redraw its congressional districts.

On September 9, the Missouri State House voted to advance the new map. The bill headed to State Senate where it also advanced on September 12. It was signed into law by Governor Kehoe on September 28.

== Impact ==
The proposed new map intended to give Republicans one additional seat in the 2026 United States House of Representatives elections. The map would have split voters of Jackson County (near Kansas City) between three congressional districts and puts Democratic Party Representative Emanuel Cleaver's district once anchored in Jackson County stretching all the way east into Osage County, while the 4th and 6th districts gain part of Kansas City in their new configurations.

The new map used Troost Avenue, a historic symbol of racial segregation in Kansas City, as the dividing line between the 4th and 5th congressional districts. The map also moved the 2nd district further into Southern Missouri, making the light red district redder. Trump won the previous version of the 2nd district by 8 points, but under the new map, he would have won it by 11 points.

== Litigation ==
=== Constitutionality of new map ===
On March 24, 2026, in Luther v. Hoskins, the Supreme Court of Missouri ruled in a 4–3 decision that the new congressional map did not violate the Missouri Constitution. Appellants had argued that Article III, Section 45, of the state constitution prohibits redistricting from occurring except for after a census. Article III, Section 45 states the following:

Congressional apportionment. When the number of representatives to which the state is entitled in the House of the Congress of the United States under the census of 1950 and each census thereafter is certified to the governor, the general assembly shall by law divide the state into districts corresponding with the number of representatives to which it is entitled, which districts shall be composed of contiguous territory as compact and as nearly equal in population as may be.

The Missouri Supreme Court disagreed with the appellants, ruling that the provision only requires that redistricting occur after a census, and does not prohibit it occurring otherwise.

=== Constitutionality of veto referendum ===
On September 3, 2026, the Supreme Court of Missouri ruled that the veto referendum was constitutional, and that it could be held on redistricting, ordering the Secretary of State to use the enacted map from 2022 in the November 2026 elections. Following the ruling, Missouri Attorney General Catherine Hanaway filed an emergency appeal to the US Supreme Court and filed a motion requesting the state Supreme Court to pause its ruling from taking effect while the appeal plays out. However, U.S. Supreme Court Justice Brett Kavanaugh denied this request on September 8, keeping the 2022 map in effect for the 2026 election. However, the same day, Chief U.S. District Judge Stephen Clark of the Eastern District of Missouri issued a temporary restraining order in a separate lawsuit prohibiting the state from using anything but the new 2025 map. On September 10, the U.S. Supreme Court granted an emergency stay of Judge Clark's order, putting the 2022 map back into place for the 2026 elections. On September 21, the United States Court of Appeals for the Eighth Circuit, ruling on the merits, affirmed the temporary restraining order and remanded the case to the lower court for entry of a permanent injunction enjoining Missouri to use the 2025 map, but stayed their ruling for a week pending appeal to the U.S. Supreme Court. On September 25, the U.S. Supreme Court granted an emergency stay of the Eighth Circuit's order and Judge Clark's injunction, barring either court from issuing any new orders requiring the use of the 2025 map.

== Endorsements ==
Yes

U.S. representatives

- Mark Alford, MO-04 (2023–present) (Republican)
- Eric Burlison, MO-07 (2023–present) (Republican)

Statewide officials

- Denny Hoskins, secretary of state of Missouri (2025–present) (Republican)

Organizations

- American Action Network
- National Republican Congressional Committee
- Republican National Committee

Political parties

- Missouri Republican Party
No

Local officials

- Quinton Lucas, mayor of Kansas City, Missouri (2019–present) (Democratic)

Party officials

- Ken Martin, chair of the Democratic National Committee (2025–present)

Labor unions

- LIUNA Missouri and Kansas Laborers District Council
- Missouri AFL-CIO
- National Education Association
- SEIU Missouri/Kansas State Council

Organizations

- Democratic National Committee
- Fairness Project
- Freedom, Inc.
- Global Impact Social Welfare Fund
- Indivisible St. Louis
- Open Society Action Fund
- Planned Parenthood Great Rivers
- St. Louis Democratic Socialists of America
- Think Big America
- Tides Foundation

Political parties

- Missouri Democratic Party

Newspapers

- The St. Louis American
- St. Louis Post-Dispatch
Declined to endorse

U.S. representatives

- Ann Wagner, MO-02 (2013–present) (Republican)

== Polling ==
Poll source	Date(s) administered	Sample size (Note: Key: A – all adults RV – registered voters LV – likely voters V – unclear)	Margin of error	Yes (Note: To approve the act)	No (Note: To reject the act)	Undecided
Saint Louis University/YouGov	August 13–24, 2026	900 (LV)	± 4.09%	35%	32%	33%

== See also ==
- 2025 California Proposition 50
- 2025 Indiana redistricting attempt
- 2025 Texas redistricting
- 2026 Florida redistricting
- 2026 Maryland Question 3
- 2026 Tennessee redistricting
- 2026 Virginia redistricting referendum
- 2026 United States ballot measures
