= Allen Paul (politician) =

American politician

Allen E. Paul

Member of the Indiana Senate from the 27th district
- In office 1986–2014
- Preceded by: David Lee Nicholson
- Succeeded by: Jeff Raatz

Personal details
- Born: Allen E. Paul; March 30, 1945 (age 81)
- Party: Republican
- Spouse: Terri
- Education: Parsons College
- Occupation: Politician

Allen E. Paul (born March 30, 1945) is a former Republican member of the Indiana Senate, representing the 27th District from 1986 until his retirement in 2014. He attended Parsons College, where he was a member of Tau Kappa Epsilon fraternity, and was a delegate to Indiana's Republican State Convention from 1972 to 1986. In 2005, Paul voted for Indiana's recognition of daylight saving time in Committee, though he indicated he was actually opposed to the measure.
