= Jeff Ellington =

American politician

Member of the Indiana Senate from the 39th district
- Incumbent
- Assumed office November 4, 2026
- Preceded by: Eric Bassler

Member of the Indiana House of Representatives from the 62nd district
- In office December 21, 2015 – November 22, 2022
- Preceded by: Matt Ubelhor
- Succeeded by: Dave Hall

Personal details
- Born: Kentucky
- Party: Republican
- Spouse: Hope
- Children: 2

Jeff Ellington is an American politician, small business owner, and retired firefighter who since 2026 has been a member of the Indiana State Senate for the 39th District. A member of the Republican Party, he previously served in the Indiana House of Representatives, representing the 62nd district from 2015 to 2022. He was appointed to the State House by a Republican caucus in December 2015 after the seat was vacated by incumbent Matt Ubelhor. He previously served on the Monroe County Council from 1997 to 2005 and was the Monroe County Recorder from 2014 to 2015. He lost reelection as Recorder in 2014. He ran for Indiana's 9th congressional district in 2002, but lost the Republican primary to Mike Sodrel. He ran for the State House in 1998 for the 60th district, but lost the general election to Peggy Welch. He attended Indiana University Bloomington from 1980 to 1982. After redistricting in Indiana, Ellington announced that he would be running for the 45th district in the Indiana House of Representatives in 2022. He lost the Republican primary to Bruce Borders in May 2022. In August 2025, Ellington announced he was running for the Indiana Senate in 2026 for the 39th district to replace Eric Bassler. After securing the endorsement of President Trump, he went on to win a three-way primary over Kristi Risk and Tanner Bouchie. He ran unopposed in the general election.

Indiana House of Representatives
Preceded by Matt Ubelhor	Member of the Indiana House of Representatives from the 62nd district 2015–2022	Succeeded by Dave Hall
