= 2024 United States presidential election in Indiana =

- November 5, 2024
- Turnout: 61.53% (▼3.05 pp)

Nominee	Donald Trump	Kamala Harris
Party	Republican	Democratic
Home state	Florida	California
Running mate	JD Vance	Tim Walz
Electoral vote	11	0
Popular vote	1,720,347	1,163,603
Percentage	58.58%	39.62%

Trump
40–50%
50–60%
60–70%
70–80%
80–90%
90–100%
Harris
40–50%
50–60%
60–70%
70–80%
80–90%
90–100%
Tie/No data
President before election
Joe Biden
Democratic
Elected President
Donald Trump
Republican

A presidential election was held in Indiana on Tuesday, November 5, 2024, as part of the 2024 United States presidential election in which all 50 states plus the District of Columbia participated. Indiana voters chose electors to represent them in the Electoral College via a popular vote. The state of Indiana has 11 electoral votes in the Electoral College, following reapportionment due to the 2020 United States census in which the state neither gained nor lost a seat.

Republican Donald Trump won Indiana for the third time in a row, with a comfortable margin of 18.96%; he had swept the state in the previous two presidential election cycles with former Governor of Indiana Mike Pence on the ticket: by 19% in 2016 and by 16% in 2020. This makes the first time since 2008 that it voted for the winner of the national popular vote. Prior to the election, all major news organizations considered Indiana a state Trump would win, or a red state. Trump flipped Tippecanoe County, which voted for him in 2016 but not in 2020. He also improved his margins in most other counties in the state, notably in Lake County, home to Gary and parts of the Chicago Metropolitan Area, which is also the most longtime Democratic county in the state. Despite Trump losing it by 5.6 points, this was the best performance by a Republican in this county since 1972, when Nixon carried it as part of his national landslide victory.

Despite Democrat Kamala Harris's loss, she slightly improved on Joe Biden's margins of defeat in a handful of suburban Indianapolis counties — most notably Hamilton, which went for Trump by less than 7% in both this election and 2020; and Boone, in which she became the first presidential Democrat to garner over 40% of the vote since Lyndon Johnson, who lost the county by a mere 4.9% in 1964. With Harris narrowly winning St. Joseph County, home to South Bend, this was the first election since 1976 in which said county did not vote for the winner of the nationwide popular vote.

== Primary elections ==
=== Democratic primary ===
The 2024 Indiana Democratic presidential primary was held on May 7, 2024. 88 delegates, 79 pledged and nine superdelegates, to the Democratic National Convention would be allocated to presidential candidates.

In Indiana, candidates have to gather at least 500 signatures from each congressional district, for a total of 4,500 signatures, to make the primary ballot. Incumbent President Joe Biden was the only candidate who met the requirements. "Uncommitted" would not appear on the ballot, and write-in votes were not allowed.

With no opposition, President Biden won 100% of the primary vote.

Indiana Democratic primary, May 7, 2024
Candidate	Votes	%	Delegates
Joe Biden	178,253	100.00	79
Total	178,253	100%	79

=== Republican primary ===
The Indiana Republican primary was held on May 7, 2024. Nikki Haley, who had already dropped out, and Donald Trump appeared on the ballot.

Indiana Republican primary, May 7, 2024
Candidate	Votes	Percentage	Actual delegate count		
Candidate	Votes	Percentage	Bound	Unbound	Total
Donald Trump	461,678	78.3%	58		
Nikki Haley (withdrawn)	128,170	21.7%			
Total:	589,848	100.0%	58		58

== General election ==
=== Predictions ===
Source	Ranking	As of
Cook Political Report	Solid R	December 19, 2023
Inside Elections	Solid R	April 26, 2023
Sabato's Crystal Ball	Safe R	June 29, 2023
Decision Desk HQ/The Hill	Safe R	December 14, 2023
CNalysis	Solid R	December 30, 2023
CNN	Solid R	January 14, 2024
The Economist	Safe R	June 12, 2024
538	Solid R	September 23, 2024
RCP	Solid R	June 26, 2024
NBC News	Safe R	October 6, 2024

=== Polling ===
Donald Trump vs. Kamala Harris

Poll source	Date(s) administered	Sample size (Note: Key: A – all adults RV – registered voters LV – likely voters V – unclear)	Margin of error	Donald Trump Republican	Kamala Harris Democratic	Other / Undecided
ActiVote	October 3–28, 2024	400 (LV)	± 4.9%	58%	42%	–
ActiVote	August 28 – September 30, 2024	400 (LV)	± 4.9%	57%	43%	–
ARW Strategies (Note: Poll sponsored by Indy Politics)	September 23–25, 2024	600 (LV)	–	55%	39%	6%
Emerson College	September 12–13, 2024	1,000 (LV)	± 3.0%	57%	40%	3% (Note: "Someone else" with 1%)
Emerson College	September 12–13, 2024	1,000 (LV)	± 3.0%	58% (Note: With voters who lean towards a given candidate)	41%	1%
Lake Research Partners (D) (Note: Poll sponsored by the campaign of Destiny Wells, 2024 Democratic nominee for attorney general)	August 26 – September 2, 2024	600 (LV)	± 4.0%	52%	42%	6%

Hypothetical polling with Donald Trump and Joe Biden

Donald Trump vs. Joe Biden

Poll source	Date(s) administered	Sample size	Margin of error	Donald Trump Republican	Joe Biden Democratic	Other / Undecided
John Zogby Strategies (Note: Poll conducted for Kennedy's campaign)	April 13–21, 2024	418 (LV)	–	47%	43%	10%
Emerson College	March 2–5, 2024	1,000 (RV)	± 3.0%	55%	34%	11%
Emerson College	October 1–4, 2023	462 (RV)	± 4.5%	48%	29%	24%

Hypothetical polling with other candidates

Donald Trump vs. Robert F. Kennedy Jr.

Poll source	Date(s) administered	Sample size	Margin of error	Donald Trump Republican	Robert F. Kennedy Jr. Independent	Other / Undecided
John Zogby Strategies	April 13–21, 2024	418 (LV)	–	44%	41%	15%

Robert F. Kennedy Jr. vs. Joe Biden

Poll source	Date(s) administered	Sample size	Margin of error	Robert Kennedy Jr. Independent	Joe Biden Democratic	Other / Undecided
John Zogby Strategies	April 13–21, 2024	418 (LV)	–	47%	38%	15%

Nikki Haley vs. Joe Biden

Poll source	Date(s) administered	Sample size	Margin of error	Nikki Haley Republican	Joe Biden Democratic	Other / Undecided
Emerson College	March 2–5, 2024	1,000 (RV)	± 3.0%	45%	29%	26%

=== Results ===
State Senate district results

State House district results

2024 United States presidential election in Indiana
Party	Candidate	Votes	%	±%
Republican	Donald Trump; JD Vance	1,720,347	58.58%	▲1.55%
Democratic	Kamala Harris; Tim Walz	1,163,603	39.62%	▼1.34%
We the People	Robert F. Kennedy Jr. (withdrawn); Nicole Shanahan (withdrawn)	29,325	1.00%	▲1.00%
Libertarian	Chase Oliver; Mike ter Maat	20,425	0.70%	▼1.24%
American Solidarity	Peter Sonski (write-in)	1,347	0.05%	▲0.02%
Socialism and Liberation	Claudia De la Cruz (write-in); Karina Garcia (write-in)	832	0.03%	▲0.03%
Independent	Cornel West (write-in); Melina Abdullah (write-in)	722	0.02%	▲0.02%
Write-in		76	0.00%	Steady
Total votes		2,936,677	100.00%	N/A

==== By county ====
County	Donald Trump Republican		Kamala Harris Democratic		Various candidates Other parties		Margin		Total
County	#	%	#	%	#	%	#	%	Total
Adams	10,528	75.28%	3,179	22.73%	279	1.99%	7,349	52.55%	13,986
Allen	90,283	55.17%	69,960	42.75%	3,407	2.08%	20,323	12.42%	163,650
Bartholomew	22,220	62.44%	12,525	35.19%	843	2.37%	9,695	27.25%	35,588
Benton	2,873	72.66%	1,010	25.54%	71	1.80%	1,863	47.12%	3,954
Blackford	3,811	74.20%	1,227	23.89%	98	1.91%	2,584	50.31%	5,136
Boone	22,840	56.70%	16,426	40.78%	1,017	2.52%	6,414	15.92%	40,283
Brown	5,647	65.46%	2,832	32.83%	148	1.71%	2,815	32.63%	8,627
Carroll	6,902	75.15%	2,120	23.08%	162	1.77%	4,782	52.07%	9,184
Cass	10,285	72.36%	3,722	26.19%	206	1.45%	6,563	46.17%	14,213
Clark	34,734	59.07%	22,810	38.79%	1,260	2.14%	11,924	20.28%	58,804
Clay	9,354	77.48%	2,495	20.67%	224	1.85%	6,859	56.81%	12,073
Clinton	9,108	73.16%	3,135	25.18%	207	1.66%	5,973	47.98%	12,450
Crawford	3,668	73.20%	1,235	24.65%	108	2.15%	2,433	48.55%	5,011
Daviess	9,322	81.42%	1,963	17.15%	164	1.43%	7,359	64.27%	11,449
Dearborn	20,844	78.36%	5,335	20.06%	421	1.58%	15,509	58.30%	26,600
Decatur	9,491	78.21%	2,406	19.83%	238	1.96%	7,085	58.38%	12,135
DeKalb	14,377	72.50%	5,064	25.54%	390	1.96%	9,313	46.96%	19,831
Delaware	26,067	56.81%	18,848	41.08%	966	2.11%	7,219	15.73%	45,881
Dubois	14,983	69.81%	5,944	27.69%	537	2.50%	9,039	42.12%	21,464
Elkhart	45,652	65.13%	23,082	32.93%	1,359	1.94%	22,570	32.20%	70,093
Fayette	7,625	77.32%	2,084	21.13%	153	1.55%	5,541	56.19%	9,862
Floyd	23,408	56.84%	17,025	41.34%	748	1.82%	6,383	15.50%	41,181
Fountain	6,311	79.07%	1,526	19.12%	145	1.81%	4,785	59.95%	7,982
Franklin	9,810	81.52%	2,061	17.13%	163	1.35%	7,749	64.39%	12,034
Fulton	6,633	74.73%	2,097	23.63%	146	1.64%	4,536	51.10%	8,876
Gibson	11,896	74.81%	3,722	23.41%	283	1.78%	8,174	51.40%	15,901
Grant	17,580	69.69%	7,083	28.08%	563	2.23%	10,497	41.61%	25,226
Greene	11,132	75.97%	3,270	22.32%	251	1.71%	7,862	53.65%	14,653
Hamilton	102,318	51.74%	90,394	45.71%	5,055	2.55%	11,924	6.03%	197,767
Hancock	29,288	65.69%	14,312	32.10%	984	2.21%	14,976	33.59%	44,584
Harrison	14,830	72.53%	5,233	25.59%	385	1.88%	9,597	46.94%	20,448
Hendricks	49,783	59.65%	31,917	38.25%	1,753	2.10%	17,866	21.40%	83,453
Henry	15,033	72.76%	5,208	25.21%	419	2.03%	9,825	47.55%	20,660
Howard	25,871	66.51%	12,197	31.36%	829	2.13%	13,674	35.15%	38,897
Huntington	12,990	73.05%	4,416	24.83%	377	2.12%	8,574	48.22%	17,783
Jackson	14,323	76.78%	4,015	21.52%	316	1.70%	10,308	55.26%	18,654
Jasper	12,082	76.25%	3,489	22.02%	275	1.73%	8,593	54.23%	15,846
Jay	6,217	76.61%	1,747	21.53%	151	1.86%	4,470	55.08%	8,115
Jefferson	9,614	66.97%	4,442	30.94%	299	2.09%	5,172	36.03%	14,355
Jennings	9,273	78.52%	2,328	19.71%	208	1.77%	6,945	58.81%	11,809
Johnson	51,588	66.09%	24,880	31.87%	1,591	2.04%	26,708	34.22%	78,059
Knox	11,236	74.30%	3,625	23.97%	262	1.73%	7,611	50.33%	15,123
Kosciusko	26,213	74.88%	7,995	22.84%	798	2.28%	18,218	52.04%	35,006
LaGrange	8,073	77.33%	2,162	20.71%	204	1.96%	5,911	56.62%	10,439
Lake	97,270	46.30%	109,086	51.92%	3,746	1.78%	-11,816	-5.62%	210,102
LaPorte	26,726	56.09%	20,007	41.99%	914	1.92%	6,719	14.10%	47,647
Lawrence	15,830	74.60%	5,010	23.61%	380	1.79%	10,820	50.99%	21,220
Madison	34,837	62.35%	19,824	35.48%	1,211	2.17%	15,013	26.87%	55,872
Marion	124,327	35.08%	221,719	62.57%	8,322	2.35%	-97,392	-27.49%	354,368
Marshall	13,837	70.54%	5,356	27.30%	423	2.16%	8,481	43.24%	19,616
Martin	3,961	79.35%	933	18.69%	98	1.96%	3,028	60.66%	4,992
Miami	10,670	76.23%	3,046	21.76%	282	2.01%	7,624	54.47%	13,998
Monroe	21,004	35.24%	37,213	62.44%	1,385	2.32%	-16,209	-27.20%	59,602
Montgomery	12,122	72.91%	4,134	24.86%	371	2.23%	7,988	48.05%	16,627
Morgan	26,965	76.12%	7,765	21.92%	693	1.96%	19,200	54.20%	35,423
Newton	5,131	77.73%	1,370	20.75%	100	1.52%	3,761	56.98%	6,601
Noble	14,209	74.82%	4,462	23.49%	321	1.69%	9,747	51.33%	18,992
Ohio	2,381	77.03%	666	21.55%	44	1.42%	1,715	55.48%	3,091
Orange	6,467	75.24%	1,988	23.13%	140	1.63%	4,479	52.11%	8,595
Owen	7,360	74.52%	2,354	23.84%	162	1.64%	5,006	50.68%	9,876
Parke	5,158	77.52%	1,371	20.60%	125	1.88%	3,787	56.92%	6,654
Perry	5,549	63.91%	2,970	34.20%	164	1.89%	2,579	29.71%	8,683
Pike	4,610	76.67%	1,314	21.85%	89	1.48%	3,296	54.82%	6,013
Porter	46,109	54.27%	37,213	43.80%	1,647	1.93%	8,896	10.47%	84,969
Posey	9,206	70.93%	3,572	27.52%	201	1.55%	5,634	43.41%	12,979
Pulaski	4,372	75.86%	1,280	22.21%	111	1.93%	3,092	53.65%	5,763
Putnam	12,566	74.95%	3,871	23.09%	329	1.96%	8,695	51.86%	16,766
Randolph	8,008	75.80%	2,349	22.23%	208	1.97%	5,659	53.57%	10,565
Ripley	11,526	80.01%	2,682	18.62%	197	1.37%	8,844	61.39%	14,405
Rush	5,812	75.91%	1,675	21.88%	169	2.21%	4,137	54.03%	7,656
St. Joseph	53,585	48.35%	55,215	49.82%	2,024	1.83%	-1,630	-1.47%	110,824
Scott	7,633	74.93%	2,389	23.45%	165	1.62%	5,244	51.48%	10,187
Shelby	14,438	73.09%	4,955	25.08%	361	1.83%	9,483	48.01%	19,754
Spencer	7,364	70.52%	2,853	27.32%	225	2.16%	4,511	43.20%	10,442
Starke	7,889	75.29%	2,436	23.25%	153	1.46%	5,453	52.04%	10,478
Steuben	11,487	70.00%	4,598	28.02%	324	1.98%	6,889	41.98%	16,409
Sullivan	6,639	75.49%	2,006	22.81%	150	1.70%	4,633	52.68%	8,795
Switzerland	3,319	77.95%	873	20.50%	66	1.55%	2,446	57.45%	4,258
Tippecanoe	32,783	48.79%	32,683	48.64%	1,728	2.57%	100	0.15%	67,194
Tipton	5,946	74.34%	1,893	23.67%	159	1.99%	4,053	50.67%	7,998
Union	2,698	77.22%	746	21.35%	50	1.43%	1,952	55.87%	3,494
Vanderburgh	41,056	55.61%	31,727	42.97%	1,049	1.42%	9,329	12.64%	73,832
Vermillion	5,174	71.21%	1,928	26.53%	164	2.26%	3,246	44.68%	7,266
Vigo	23,738	57.87%	16,338	39.83%	947	2.30%	7,400	18.04%	41,023
Wabash	10,425	74.57%	3,335	23.86%	220	1.57%	7,090	50.71%	13,980
Warren	3,402	77.85%	898	20.55%	70	1.60%	2,504	57.30%	4,370
Warrick	21,280	64.10%	11,292	34.02%	624	1.88%	9,988	30.08%	33,196
Washington	9,739	76.55%	2,764	21.72%	220	1.73%	6,975	54.83%	12,723
Wayne	17,526	65.33%	8,828	32.91%	473	1.76%	8,698	32.42%	26,827
Wells	11,006	77.86%	2,850	20.16%	280	1.98%	8,156	57.70%	14,136
White	7,969	71.30%	2,945	26.35%	262	2.35%	5,024	44.95%	11,176
Whitley	13,122	73.83%	4,275	24.05%	377	2.12%	8,847	49.78%	17,774
Totals	1,720,347	58.43%	1,163,603	39.52%	60,386	2.05%	556,744	18.91%	2,944,336

Counties that flipped from Democratic to Republican

- Tippecanoe (largest city: Lafayette)

==== By congressional district ====
Trump won seven of nine congressional districts.

District	Trump	Harris	Representative
1st	49.02%	49.41%	Frank J. Mrvan
2nd	62.48%	35.97%	Rudy Yakym
3rd	64.75%	33.56%	Jim Banks (118th Congress)
3rd	64.75%	33.56%	Marlin Stutzman (119th Congress)
4th	63.77%	34.43%	Jim Baird
5th	57.47%	40.66%	Victoria Spartz
6th	65.39%	32.86%	Greg Pence (118th Congress)
6th	65.39%	32.86%	Jefferson Shreve (119th Congress)
7th	28.44%	69.89%	André Carson
8th	67.10%	31.22%	Larry Bucshon (118th Congress)
8th	67.10%	31.22%	Mark Messmer (119th Congress)
9th	64.12%	34.23%	Erin Houchin

== Notes ==
Partisan clients

== See also ==
- United States presidential elections in Indiana
- 2024 United States presidential election
- 2024 Democratic Party presidential primaries
- 2024 Republican Party presidential primaries
- 2024 United States elections
