= Milo E. Smith =

American politician

Member of the Indiana House of Representatives from the 59th district
- In office November 8, 2006 – November 7, 2018
- Preceded by: David Yount
- Succeeded by: Ryan Lauer

Personal details
- Born: July 18, 1950 (age 76) Columbus, Indiana, United States
- Party: Republican

Milo Eugene Smith (born July 18, 1950) is a Republican and a former member of the Indiana House of Representatives representing the 59th district where he served from 2006 to 2018. He attended Indiana University–Purdue University Columbus. On December 28, 2017, Smith introduced a bill that would require the Indianapolis Colts to offer fans refunds if Colts players kneel during the national anthem at home games. On January 11, 2018, Smith announced that he would not be running for another term in the State House.

In 2023, Milo announced his campaign for Mayor of Columbus, Indiana. He lost the primary in May 2023. In 2025, Smith announced he was running for the Indiana Senate in 2026 for the 41st district to replace Greg Walker.
