= Eric Bassler =

American politician and financial advisor

Member of the Indiana Senate from the 39th district
- In office November 5, 2014 – November 4, 2026
- Preceded by: John Waterman
- Succeeded by: Jeff Ellington

Personal details
- Born: Washington, Indiana, U.S.
- Party: Republican
- Children: 5
- Education: Indiana University Bloomington (BA, MA)

Eric S. Bassler is an American politician and financial advisor who formerly served as a member of the Indiana Senate from the 39th district.

== Early life and education ==
Bassler was born and raised in Washington, Indiana. He earned a Bachelor of Arts degree in chemistry and psychology and a Master of Arts degree in economics from Indiana University Bloomington.

== Career ==
Bassler began his career as a consultant on bank reform projects and was a Peace Corps volunteer in the Soviet Union, Albania, and Ukraine. He has since worked as a certified financial planner at an Edward Jones Investments office in Washington, Indiana.

Bassler was elected to the Indiana Senate in November 2014. In the 2019–2020 legislative session, Bassler served as chair of the Senate Insurance and Financial Institutions Committee. In the 2021–2022 session, he is the ranking member of the Senate Appropriations Committee. He is also chair of the Senate School Funding Subcommittee.

In July 2025, Bassler announced he would not run for a fourth term in the Indiana Senate in 2026.
