= Nick McKinley =

American politician

Member of the Indiana Senate from the 17th district
- In office February 9, 2026 – November 4, 2026
- Preceded by: Andy Zay
- Succeeded by: Chris Parker

Personal details
- Party: Republican
- Children: 6
- Education: Bethel University (BA, MBA)

Nick McKinley is an American politician who formerly served as a member of the Indiana Senate for the 17th district.

== Early life and education ==
McKinley was born and raised in northern Indiana. He earned a bachelor's degree in organizational management and an MBA from Bethel University.

== Career ==
McKinley worked in IT before pursuing a career in law enforcement. He served as a reserve officer in Winona Lake, Indiana, and as a full-time police officer with the South Bend Police Department. After moving to Marion, Indiana, with his family, McKinley became a licensed insurance agent and opened his own agency. McKinley also served as an at-large member of the Marion City Council. After Andy Zay vacated his seat in the Indiana Senate to serve as a member of the Indiana Utility Regulatory Commission, McKinley was elected in the Republican caucus to succeed him. Running for a full term, he lost the May 2026 primary to realtor Chris Parker by roughly 500 votes.
