= Jeff Raatz =

American politician (born 1963)

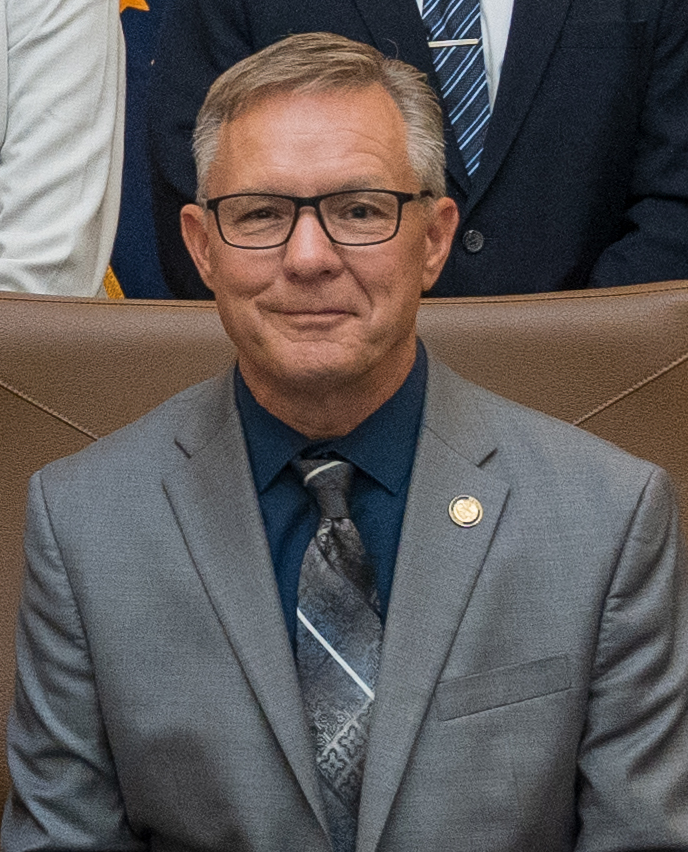

Member of the Indiana Senate from the 27th district
- Incumbent
- Assumed office November 5, 2014
- Preceded by: Allen Paul

Personal details
- Born: Jeffrey Scott Raatz; September 13, 1963 (age 63)
- Party: Republican
- Spouse: Lisa Collmer
- Children: 2
- Education: Baker College (BA); Miami University (MA)

Jeff Raatz (born September 13, 1963) is a member of the Indiana Senate, representing the 27th District. A member of the Republican Party, he elected to the State Senate in 2014. He has a bachelor's degree in business from Baker College and a master's degree in political science from Miami University. He previously served in the United States Army.
