= Scott Houldieson =

American politician

Member of the Indiana Senate from the 1st district
- Incumbent
- Assumed office November 4, 2026
- Preceded by: Dan Dernulc

Personal details
- Party: Democratic

Scott Houldieson is an American politician who is the Member of the Indiana State Senate from the 1st district since 2026.
