= Andy Zay =

American politician

Commissioner of Indiana Utility Regulatory Commission
- In office January 12, 2026 – August 3, 2026
- Governor: Mike Braun
- Preceded by: Jim Huston
- Succeeded by: Vacant

Chairman of Indiana Utility Regulatory Commission
- In office January 12, 2026 – June 22, 2026
- Governor: Mike Braun
- Preceded by: Jim Huston
- Succeeded by: Anthony Swinger

Member of the Indiana Senate from the 17th district
- In office December 20, 2016 – January 8, 2026
- Preceded by: Jim Banks
- Succeeded by: Nick McKinley

Personal details
- Born: Huntington, Indiana, U.S.
- Party: Republican
- Children: 5
- Education: Indiana University, Bloomington (BS)

Andy Zay is an American businessman and politician who served as a member of the Indiana Senate from the 17th district. Elected in November 2016, he assumed office on December 20, 2016. Since 2026, he has served as a commissioner of the Indiana Utility Regulatory Commission.

== Early life and education ==
Zay was born and raised in Huntington, Indiana. He earned a Bachelor of Science degree in human resources management and personnel administration from Indiana University Bloomington.

== Career ==
In 1989, Zay founded Zay Leasing & Rentals.

=== State Senate ===
He was elected to the Indiana Senate in November 2016 and assumed office on December 20, 2016. In the 2021–2022 legislative session, Zay has served as chair of the Senate Insurance and Financial Institutions Committee. He was previously the ranking member of the committee. In 2018, Zay was criticized when Facebook messages were uncovered in which Zay wrote "racism is not real."

On March 2, 2023, Zay announced that he is running for Indiana's 3rd Congressional District in 2024. Zay was defeated by former U.S. Representative Marlin Stutzman won the nomination by a narrow margin, leading Zay and other candidates.

=== Indiana Utility Regulatory Commission ===
In December 2025, Governor Mike Braun appointed Zay to chair the Indiana Utility Regulatory Commission. In January 2026, Zay resigned his seat early, since the Indiana Constitution bars government employees from concurrently holding more than one “lucrative,” or paid, office. In June 2026, Governor Braun removed Zay as chairman, while retaining him as a commissioner, after he voted to approve roughly $70 million in new annual revenue for AES Indiana. Braun replaced Zay with Anthony Swinger. In August 2026, Zay was fired from the commission for non-adherence to state policies and laws, specifically, failure to file a required financial disclosure after his removal as chairman of the IURC, improperly awarding payments and personal gifts to employees, and directing staff to change public meeting agendas without consulting the new IURC chairman.

== Personal life ==
Zay has a son, Isaac, who is a linebacker for the Toledo Rockets football team.
