= Ron Alting =

Member of the Indiana State Senate

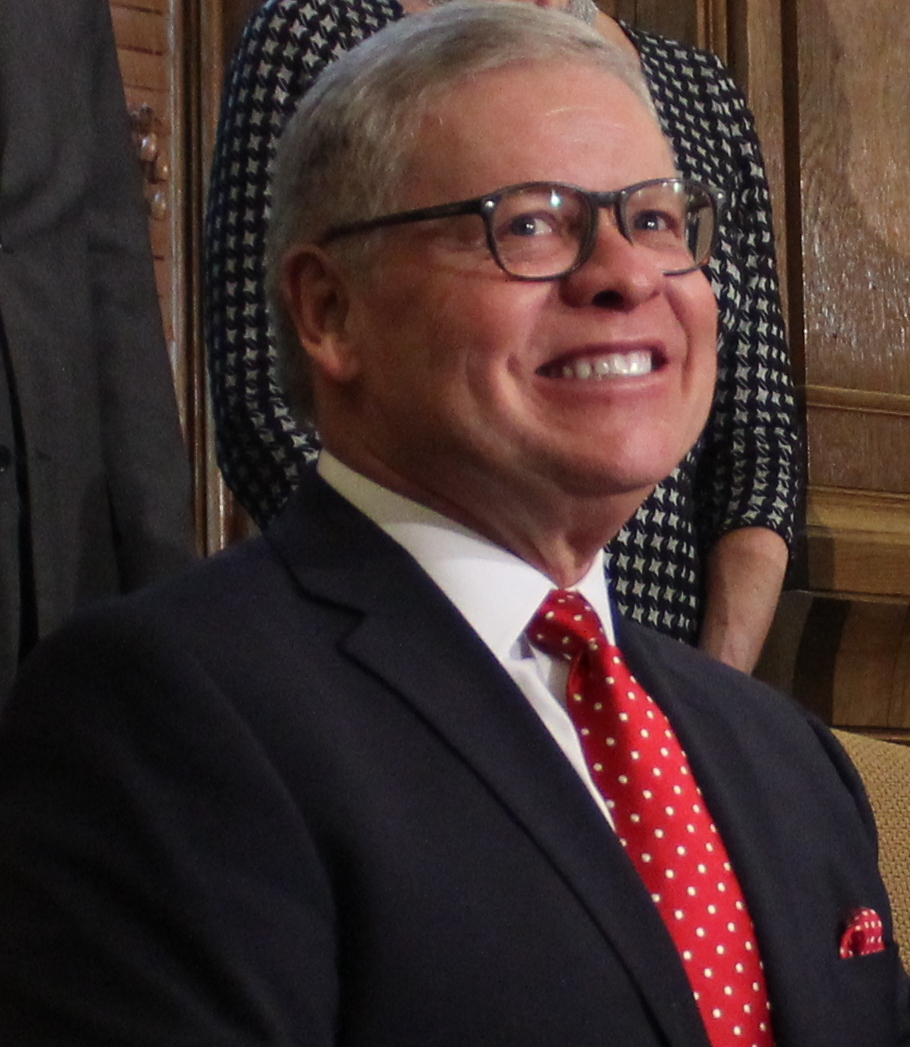

Member of the Indiana Senate from the 22nd district
- In office November 17, 1998 – November 4, 2026
- Preceded by: Michael E. Gery
- Succeeded by: Natasha Baker

Personal details
- Born: Lafayette, Indiana, U.S.
- Party: Republican
- Children: 2
- Education: Purdue University (BS)

Ronald J. Alting is a former member of the Indiana State Senate representing Senate District 22, which contains most of Tippecanoe County. He is a Republican. Alting was first elected to the Indiana State Senate in 1998. Prior to that, Alting served as a member of the Lafayette, Indiana City Council.

== Education ==
Alting holds a Bachelor of Science degree from Purdue University.

== Political career ==
Alting was President of the Lafayette, Indiana City Council from 1995 to 1998. He was first elected to the Indiana State Senate in 1998. He defeated Democratic nominee Michael Oxenrider in 2010, was unopposed for reelection in 2014, and was re-elected in 2018 against his Democratic opponent Sherry Shipley, a dean at Ivy Tech Community College. In the Senate, he has held the Republican Caucus position of Assistant Majority Whip. In the Senate, Alting has been chair of the Public Policy Committee and a member of the Elections Committee and Judiciary Committee. He has also been a member of the Subcommittee on Probate Code and Trusts.

Alting voted for the controversial Religious Freedom Restoration Act in 2015, although he later said that he "tremendously" regretted that vote. Along with Senator Mike Bohacek, Alting has sponsored a hate crimes bill in the state Senate in 2019, seeking to allow judges to increase sentences for bias-motivated crimes (Indiana is one of just five states without such a law). In 2019, Alting asked his colleagues in the Senate to "be on the right side of Indiana history" by voting for the legislation. Other Republicans in the state Senate, however, gutted the bill, removing the specified protection categories—race, religion, sex, sexual orientation, gender identity, and disability—and replacing them with a generic definition of "bias." Alting voted against the bill as amended, honoring a pledge not to support any hate-crimes bill that omitted protections based on sexual orientation or gender identity.

In 2020, Alting supported legislation to create more protections for pregnant women in the workplace; the measure would mandate that additional Indiana businesses "allow pregnant women to take longer breaks, transfer to less physical work and take unpaid time off after childbirth." The bill was supported by Indiana's Republican Governor Eric Holcomb as well as by Democrats, as a way to reduce Indiana's infant mortality rate (which is among the highest in the U.S.). However, the proposal was opposed by the business lobby, specifically the Indiana Chamber of Commerce and the Indiana Manufacturers Association. Other Republicans in the legislature ultimately killed the proposal, sending it to a study committee.

In 2022, Alting came out as pro-choice in explaining his opposition to a bill that would ban many abortions with exceptions for health of the mother and rape. He criticized the bill as taking away the rights of women, "particularly those of making a choice, not that all those choices will be that of abortion, but making a choice."

In October 2026, Alting was accused of being involved in multiple shoplifting incidents at Walmart. He blamed the incidents on "concerning changes in my judgment, behavior and cognitive functioning". He stepped away from active campaigning, and said he would resign if re-elected. Alting went on to lose his Senate seat in the 2026 election to Natasha Baker. In November 2026, Alting was charged with six misdemeanor counts of theft.

== Business career ==
Alting is a Key Account Specialist, Tipmont REMC (Rural Electric Membership Cooperative) and has been an officer in the Indiana Guard Reserve. He was also the founder, owner, and manager of Patout's of New Orleans in Lafayette.

== Personal life ==
Alting is a widower with two children. His hometown is in Lafayette, Indiana. He is a Methodist.
