= Daryl Schmitt =

American politician

Member of the Indiana Senate from the 48th district
- Incumbent
- Assumed office September 10, 2024
- Preceded by: Mark Messmer

Personal details
- Party: Republican

Daryl Schmitt is an American politician and member of the Indiana Senate from the 48th district. He was sworn in to replace Mark Messmer. He is a former councilman in Dubois County.
