= John Waterman =

American politician (born 1952)

Member of the Indiana Senate from the 39th district
- In office 1994 – 5 November 2014
- Preceded by: Maurice Doll
- Succeeded by: Eric Bassler

Sheriff of Sullivan County
- In office 1986–1994
- Preceded by: Byron Thrasher
- Succeeded by: Bill Miller

Personal details
- Born: 13 May 1952 (age 73)
- Party: Republican
- Spouse: Cheryl
- Children: 6

For John Waterman of Rhode Island see John R. Waterman House

John M. Waterman (born May 13, 1952) is an American politician and law enforcement officer who served as a member of the Indiana Senate from 1994 to 2014. Elected to represent the 39th district in 1995, Waterman served in the chamber until being defeated for the Republican nomination for the 39th senate district by Eric Bassler in 2014.

Waterman previously served as Sheriff of Sullivan County, Indiana from 1986 to 1994. He replaced Byron Thrasher who was appointed in October 1986. He ran for Sullivan County commissioner in 2016.

In October 2023, Waterman filed paperwork to become a candidate for the caucus to replace State Senator Jon Ford in Indiana's 38th Senate district.
