= David Sanders (biologist) =

American biochemist

- Born: Teaneck, New Jersey
- Notable work

West Lafayette City Council At-Large
- Incumbent
- Assumed office 2016
- Scientific career
- Education: Yale College, University of California at Berkeley
- Fields: Molecular Virology
- Workplaces: Purdue University
- Doctoral advisor: Daniel E. Koshland Jr.
- Other academic advisors: Richard C. Mulligan

David Sanders is an associate professor of biological sciences at Purdue University. He grew up in Teaneck, New Jersey, and then attended the Horace Mann School in Riverdale, New York. He received his Bachelor of Science degree from Yale College in Molecular Biophysics and Biochemistry. He conducted his Ph.D. research in Biochemistry with Daniel E. Koshland, Jr. at the University of California at Berkeley. Sanders demonstrated that the response regulators in the two-component regulatory systems were phosphorylated on an aspartate residue and that they were protein phosphatases with a covalent intermediate. In 1995, he joined the Markey Center for Structural Biology at Purdue University.

In 2016, Sanders was elected to the West Lafayette City Council. He has opposed the plan to divert hundreds of millions of gallons of water from Tippecanoe County aquifers to an advanced manufacturing park project in Boone County, and he sponsored the West Lafayette City Council resolution opposing the pipeline.

== Scientific career ==
=== Research ===
Sanders originated the idea of the "Molecule of the Year" feature in Science. He was a visiting scientist at the University of California at San Francisco, and then a postdoctoral fellow at the Whitehead Institute for Biomedical Research, which is affiliated with MIT. It was there that he began his studies on the entry of viruses into cells with a focus on the inhibition of infection and applications to gene therapy.

Sanders joined the Markey Center for Structural Biology at Purdue University in 1995, where he was the leader of the Molecular Virology program and also a member of the Cancer Center. He was the discoverer of a biochemical reaction, thiol-disulfide exchange, that leads to the entry of cancer-causing retroviruses into cells. He also is the primary inventor on two U.S. patents on novel gene-therapy delivery techniques.

His work on the Ebola virus led to his participation in the U.S. Defense Threat Reduction Agency's Biological Weapons Proliferation Prevention Program, a product of the Nunn-Lugar legislation. His responsibilities included inspecting the Vector laboratory in Siberia, which was the site of biological-weapons development in the era of the Soviet Union. He has investigated the transmission of viruses from other animals, especially birds, to humans and has been invited to speak on ethics, biodefense, evolution, gene therapy, vaccination and influenza viruses in public forums including regular interviews on WIBC in Indianapolis,

He received a National Science Foundation CAREER Award for his work on an enzyme involved in producing methane, a greenhouse gas and potential energy source. He is also an American Cancer Society Research Scholar. In 2003 he conducted his sabbatical research at the Weizmann Institute in Israel.

Sanders strongly criticized a 2010 Science article authored by Felisa Wolfe-Simon and Paul Davies, in which the discovery of arsenic-based life is claimed. He argued that the original Science article on the arsenic bacteria should be retracted, on the basis that the data in the paper were misrepresented in the article. The article was retracted in 2025.

Sanders's work on the Ebola virus led to media interviews during the 2014 Ebola virus disease outbreak in Western Africa. He declared that there was little risk on infection for the individual American and asserted that the panic about the virus could be worse than the disease in the United States. He was an early advocate of focusing on regional centers as places for treatment of Ebola virus victims in the United States and asserted that patients should share their travel history whenever they meet with a medical provider, stating, "If you go to South America or East Asia there is a different ensemble of possible diseases associated with a set of symptoms, and the physician won't necessarily think about them if he isn't aware of where you've been traveling recently." He opposed mandatory quarantines for asymptomatic patients that may have been exposed to Ebola virus. Sanders wrote an article about his experience with the media including an encounter with Karl Rove.

During the Coronavirus disease 2019 outbreak Sanders has been interviewed about the science behind public policy. He was reported to have criticized President Donald Trump for touting the use of chloroquine as a treatment for Coronavirus disease 2019.

An article by Sanders was featured among a collection about keeping up with the contemporary academic literature. He has also described new approaches to developing the literary skills of graduate students in the sciences and rubrics for how to write (and how not to write) a scientific review article.

A biographical memoir on his doctoral advisor, Daniel E. Koshland Jr. by Sanders has been published by the United States National Academy of Sciences.

=== Work on plagiarism and academic integrity ===
Sanders is regarded as a scientific detective, arguing that plagiarism is a serious academic issue that must be confronted. He also maintains that guest authors are plagiarists and offers a simpler definition of plagiarism.

According to the New York Times, Sanders contacted scientific journals to obtain corrections and retractions of articles by Carlo M. Croce. Sanders "made claims of falsified data and plagiarism directly to scientific journals where more than 20 of Croce's papers have been published." In 2017 Croce filed a defamation lawsuit against Sanders, who was quoted in the New York Times article that reported allegations of scientific misconduct against Croce. In May 2020 Croce lost the defamation lawsuit against Sanders. The presiding judge wrote: “…Discovery has proved the existence of about 30 instances of fabrication or duplication" in Croce's research papers, and "Sanders has a knack for detecting image duplication and remembering the blots he sees reported in scientific journals."

The United States Court of Appeals for the Sixth Circuit of Appeal upheld the dismissal of the lawsuit, stating: "Journals have found research problems and plagiarism in articles coming from Croce’s lab. Sometimes, the problems were severe enough for the journals to publish corrections or expressions of concern (and sometimes to withdraw the paper). However you define 'scientific norms,' we know that academic journals felt some responsibility to alert the scientific community about problems in some of Croce’s papers. That suggests the papers contained problems outside the range of acceptable research and publishing practices. Thus, the statement that people in Croce’s lab have violated scientific norms is substantially true." Sanders was interviewed about his experience defending himself in the suit wherein he recommended collaborations between scientific whistleblowers.

Sanders authored an article on reforming grant peer review with the goal of reducing bias.

=== University Senate ===
As Chair of the Purdue University Senate, Sanders published a statement of academic principles.

== Political career ==
=== Elections ===
In 2002, he unsuccessfully challenged Republican State Senator Ron Alting in District 22.

Sanders was the Democratic candidate for Congress in the 4th District of Indiana in 2004, 2006, and 2010, losing to Steve Buyer in the first two elections and to Todd Rokita in the third. Years later, in a discussion about gerrymandering, Sanders called the seat he ran for in Indiana's 4th Congressional District as having been drawn so that it was "No Republican Left Behind."

Sanders was elected by Democrats of the 4th Congressional District of Indiana to serve as a delegate pledged to Barack Obama at the 2008 Democratic National Convention.

On November 3, 2015, Sanders was elected as a City Councilor At-Large for West Lafayette and on November 5, 2019, David Sanders was reelected.

On January 25, 2022, Sanders announced his candidacy for Indiana State Senator District 23 stating that "he hoped to help rural counties feel less neglected by the state government.". His opponent in the election backed out of the only scheduled debate in the race.

=== West Lafayette City Council ===
Sanders began his term on the Council in 2016, after a campaign in which he promised "careful oversight", "transparency" and "quantitative analytical skills".

In 2017, Sanders introduced and passed a resolution declaring West Lafayette a "machaseh" — that is, a refuge, for immigrants. The resolution was debated at multiple meetings and was crafted to adhere to state law which prohibits sanctuary cities.

In 2017, Sanders took a knee during a city council meeting immediately after the pledge of allegiance. He later wrote an op-ed explaining his reasons which included an "assault on the constitutional right to free speech", “Indiana voter ID laws (the new poll taxes)”, “the war on drugs” and “the very name of our state” as a reminder of the unfair treatment of Native Americans.

In 2018, Sanders sponsored a resolution to encourage businesses to stop using plastic straws and utensils, which passed the city council.

In 2021, Sanders sponsored an ordinance to prohibit unlicensed therapists from practicing conversion therapy in West Lafayette. It was withdrawn because of the threat of a lawsuit.

Sanders has made personal privacy a focus of his city council service and he was the sponsor of an ordinance banning facial recognition surveillance technology that twice passed the city council. It was vetoed by the mayor.

Sanders opposed a tax abatement for Rolls-Royce because he regarded the Economic Revitalization Zone necessary for the abatement to be inconsistent with Indiana law and questioned whether the company needed the tax abatement. He also expressed his concern about providing tax abatements to a company that had been involved in the largest bribery scandal in UK history and was fined by the United States in 2017 for bribery of foreign officials.

Sanders founded the "Stop the Water Steal" organization "in opposition to a state-sponsored project that would pump as much as 100 million gallons of water per day from aquifers connected to the Wabash River to an advanced manufacturing park in Boone County."
