= 2025 Indiana redistricting attempt =

Unsuccessful proposal to change Indiana's congressional districts

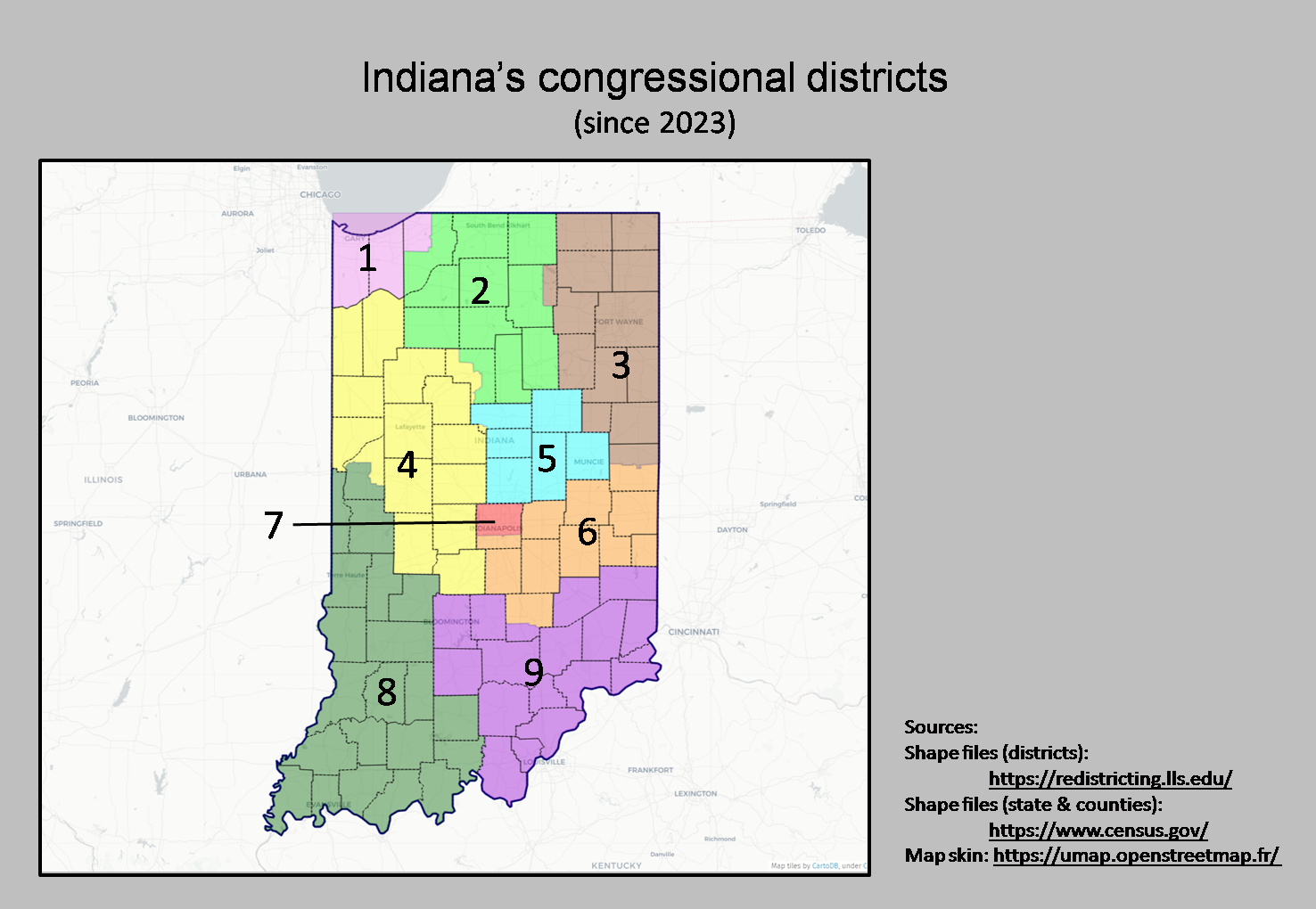
Indiana's current congressional districts map since 2023 Interactive map version

Between October and December 2025, Indiana lawmakers considered redrawing the state's congressional districts to eliminate Democratic representation in the U.S. House of Representatives. The push followed calls from President Donald Trump, and after other states, including Texas, California, Virginia, and Missouri, sought to gerrymander their congressional districts. The proposal was rejected in the State Senate on December 11.

In 2026, seven out of the nine Republicans who voted against redistricting retired or lost renomination. Three out of the seven lost the general election.

== Background ==
In 2025, after Texas adopted a new congressional map, California, in response, adopted their own.

On October 10, 2025, Vice President JD Vance met in Indianapolis with Republican state legislators to discuss the "pros and cons" of redistricting.

== Proposed legislation ==
A bill passed by the State House sought to amend Indiana's congressional districts to foster in more Republican support. The legislation, which was passed by the House on December 5, 2025, cracked Indiana's 1st and 7th districts. The 7th, which includes Indianapolis, was split between four different districts in the proposed map.

December 5, 2025, vote in the State House
Political affiliation	Voted for	Voted against	No vote
Republican Party	57	12	1
Democratic Party	—	29	1
Total	57	41	2

The proposal ran into opposition in the Republican-supermajority Senate, with over a dozen Republican Senators voicing opposition to the move ahead of the vote. In an attempt to pressure holdouts to vote in favor of redrawing the map, Trump vowed to back primary challengers to all Republicans who vote against it. Independent of these actions, a number of Senators were targets of threats of violence against them ahead of the vote, including bomb threats and swatting calls. The bill failed on December 11, 2025, after opposition votes came from 21 Republicans and all 10 Democrats.

2025 Indiana Senate redistricting vote Republican no (21) Republican yes (19) Democratic no (10)

December 11, 2025, vote in the State Senate
Political affiliation	Voted for	Voted against
Republican Party	19	21
Democratic Party	—	10
Total	19	31

== Impact ==
GOP redistricting opponents primary results Won re-nomination Lost re-nomination Retired

With the bill's failure, Indiana's congressional map will remain the same for the 2026 elections, allowing both incumbent Democratic congressmen much easier paths to re-election. Republican governor Mike Braun has vowed to assist Trump in primarying the Republican Senators who voted against redistricting in the 2026 and 2028 primaries.

In 2026, 5 out of the 7 Republicans who voted against redistricting lost renomination. In November 2026, 2 out of the 5 nominees lost the general election.

Based on the results of the state-wide elections, had Indiana used the redrawn map, it would have resulted in Democrats winning every redrawn district for a net gain of 9 seats. The actual results of the election using the original map resulted in Democrats gaining one additional seat.

== See also ==
- 2025–2026 Virginia redistricting
- 2025 Missouri redistricting
