= Mark Messmer =

American politician (born 1962)

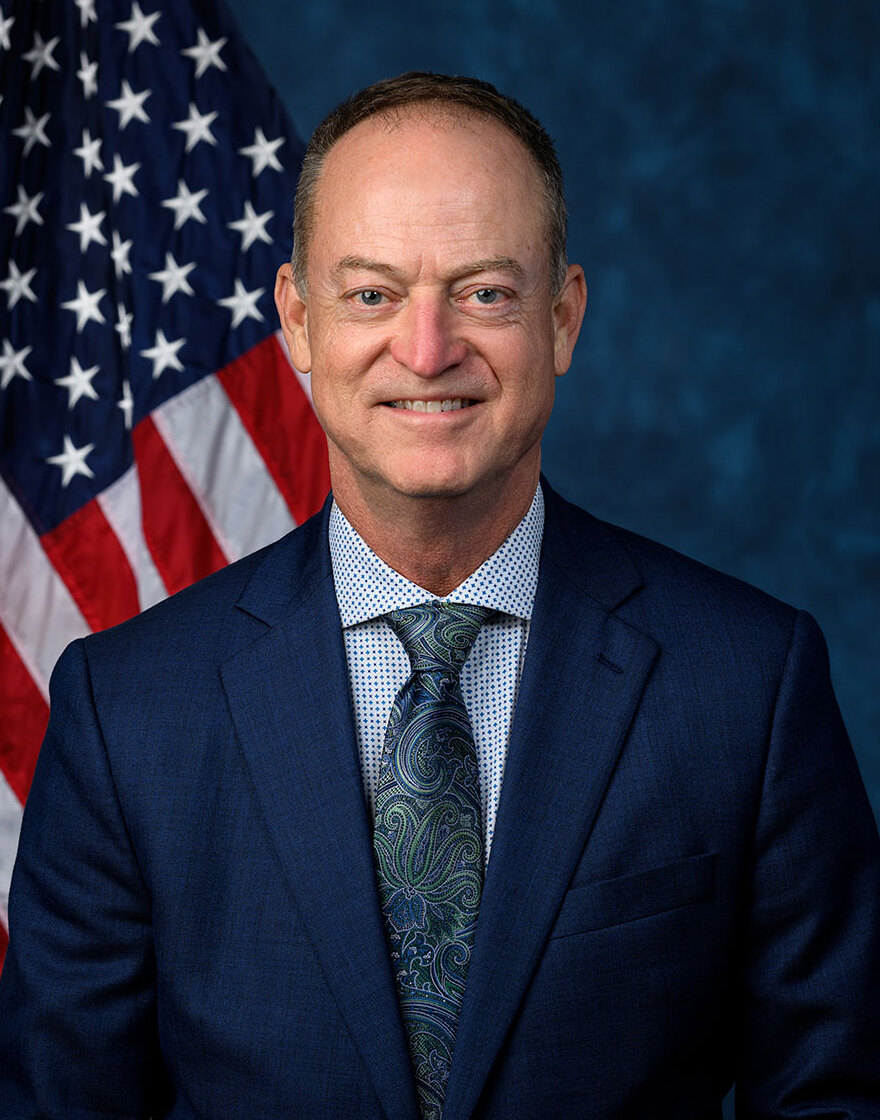
- Official portrait, 2024

Member of the U.S. House of Representatives from Indiana's 8th district
- Incumbent
- Assumed office January 3, 2025
- Preceded by: Larry Bucshon

Majority Leader of the Indiana Senate
- In office November 7, 2018 – August 17, 2022
- Preceded by: Rodric Bray
- Succeeded by: Chris Garten

Member of the Indiana Senate from the 48th district
- In office November 5, 2014 – September 3, 2024
- Preceded by: Lindel Hume
- Succeeded by: Daryl Schmitt

Member of the Indiana House of Representatives from the 63rd district
- In office November 5, 2008 – November 5, 2014
- Preceded by: Dave Crooks
- Succeeded by: Mike Braun

Personal details
- Born: Mark Brian Messmer; September 21, 1962 (age 64)
- Party: Republican
- Education: Purdue University
- Website: House website Campaign website

Mark Brian Messmer (born September 21, 1962) is an American politician who has served as the U.S. representative for Indiana's 8th congressional district since 2025. He is a member of the Republican Party.

Previously, Messmer served in the Indiana House of Representatives from 2008 to 2014 and the Indiana Senate from 2014 to 2024, serving as majority leader of the chamber from 2018 to 2022. Before that, he previously served on the Holy Family School Board from 2001 to 2004, and as its president from 2003 to 2004.

Representing a safe Republican district, Messmer was first elected to Congress in 2024 after winning a crowded Republican primary with 38% of the vote. He is a member of the moderate Republican Governance Group.

== Indiana House of Representatives ==
In 2022, Messmer sponsored a bill that bans the foreign ownership of agricultural land in Indiana. He also sponsored bills in 2022 to provide in-state tuition and drivers licenses to illegal immigrants.

== U.S. House of Representatives ==
In February 2024, Messmer announced his candidacy for Indiana's 8th congressional district in the 2024 election. He defeated former U.S. Representative John Hostettler in the primary by a wide margin of roughly 20 points. He resigned from the Indiana Senate in September 2024 in order to focus on his campaign. Messmer would later go on to defeat his Democratic opponent, Erik Hurt.

=== Tenure ===
Messmer was sworn into the 119th United States Congress on January 3, 2025.

In 2026, he voted against extending the Affordable Care Act enhanced tax credits.

=== Committee assignments ===
- United States House Committee on Agriculture
  - Subcommittee on Conservation, Research, and Biotechnology
  - Subcommittee on Livestock, Dairy, and Poultry
  - Subcommittee on Commodity Markets, Digital Assets, and Rural Development
- Committee on Armed Services
  - Subcommittee on Readiness
  - Subcommittee on Strategic Forces
- Committee on Education and Workforce
  - Subcommittee on Early Childhood, Elementary, and Secondary Education
  - Subcommittee on Workforce Protections (Vice Chair)

=== Caucus memberships ===
- Main Street Caucus
- Congressional Western Caucus

== Electoral history ==
2024 Indiana's 8th congressional district Republican primary results
Party	Candidate	Votes	%
Republican	Mark Messmer	30,668	38.5
Republican	John Hostettler	15,649	19.7
Republican	Richard Moss	11,227	14.1
Republican	Dominick Kavanaugh	9,397	11.8
Republican	Kristi Risk	7,350	9.2
Republican	Luke Misner	2,287	2.9
Republican	Jim Case	2,107	2.6
Republican	Jeremy Heath	944	1.2
Total votes		79,629	100.0

2024 Indiana's 8th congressional district election
Party	Candidate	Votes	%
Republican	Mark Messmer	219,941	68.0
Democratic	Erik Hurt	95,311	29.5
Libertarian	Richard Fitzlaff	8,381	2.6
Total votes		323,633	100.0

== Personal life ==
Messmer is a Catholic.

Indiana Senate
Preceded by Rodric Bray	Majority Leader of the Indiana Senate; 2018–2022	Succeeded by Chris Garten
U.S. House of Representatives
Preceded by Larry Bucshon	Member of the U.S. House of Representatives from Indiana's 8th congressional district 2025–present	Incumbent
U.S. order of precedence (ceremonial)
Preceded by John McGuire	United States representatives by seniority 404th	Succeeded by Dave Min
