= 2022 Indiana Senate election =

- November 8, 2022

25 of the 50 seats in the Indiana Senate 26 seats needed for a majority
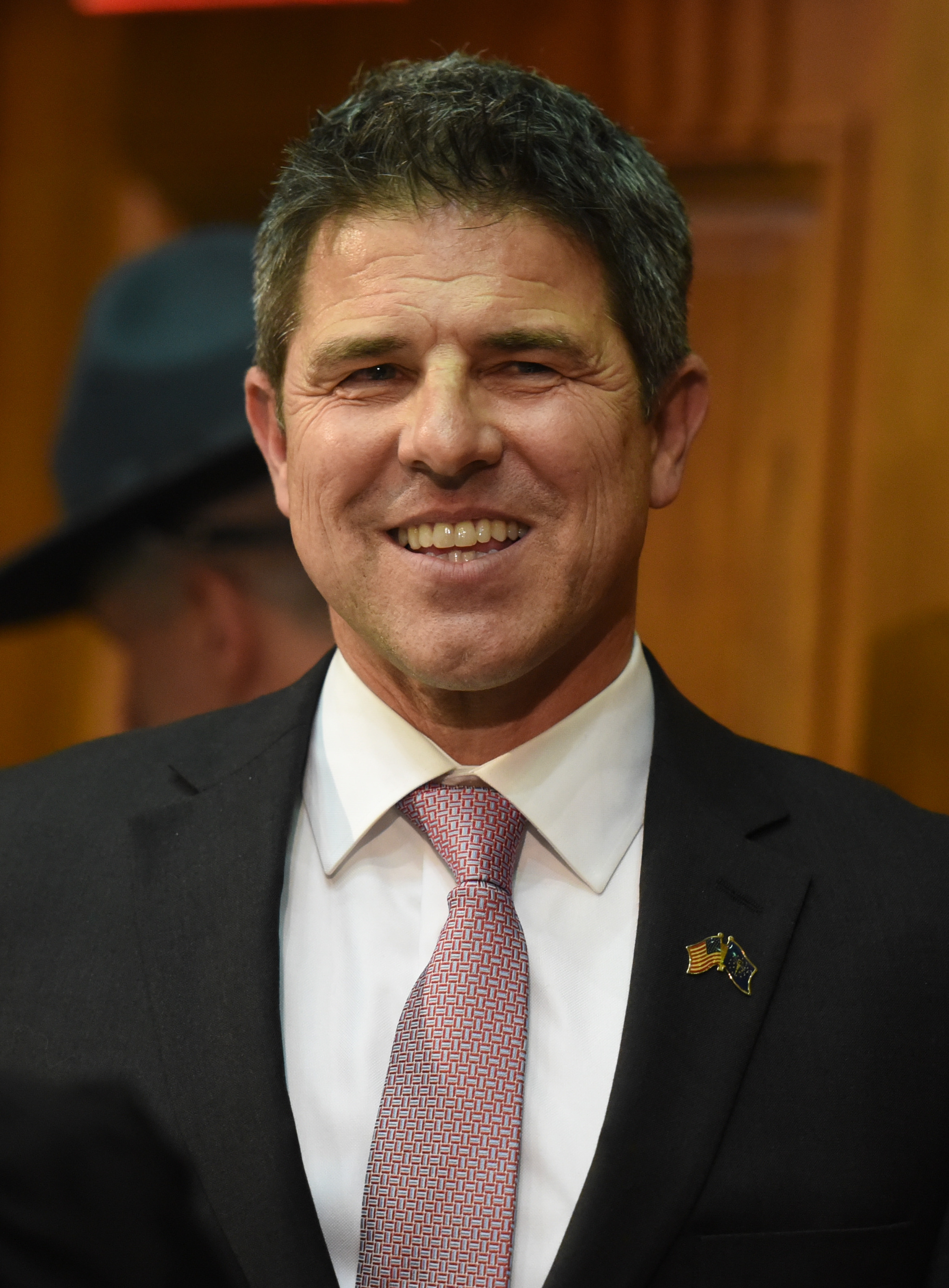

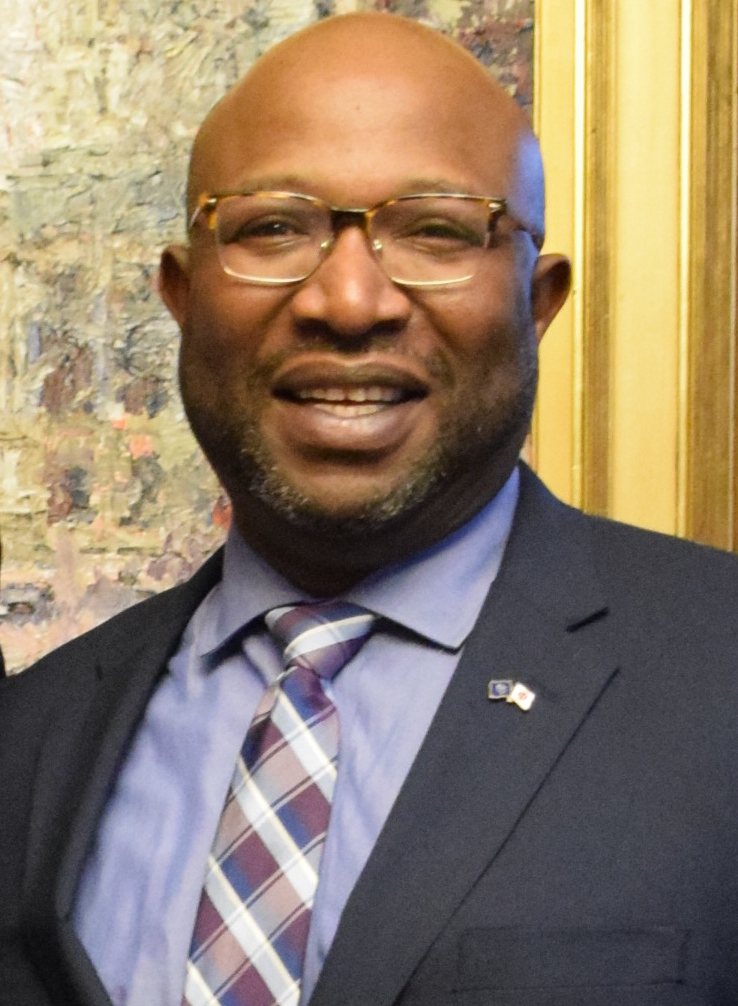
	Majority party	Minority party
Leader	Rodric Bray	Greg Taylor
Party	Republican	Democratic
Leader since	November 20, 2018	November 8, 2021
Leader's seat	37th district	33rd district
Seats before	39	11
Seats after	40	10
Seat change	▲1	▼1
Popular vote	631,551	260,751
Percentage	70.78%	29.22%
Swing	▲14.18%	▼14.18%
- Democratic gain Republican gain Democratic hold Republican hold No election 50–60% 60–70% 70–80% >90% 50–60% 70–80%
President pro tempore before election
Rodric Bray
Republican
Elected President pro tempore
Rodric Bray
Republican

The 2022 Indiana Senate election took place on Tuesday, November 8, 2022, with elections in the U.S. state of Indiana, coinciding with other elections in the state, U.S. House, and Indiana House, as well as various other state and local elections. Voters elected members to 25 of the 50 seats in the Indiana Senate to serve four-year terms in single-member constituencies. The primary election took place on Tuesday, May 3, 2022. The Republican Party had held a majority since 2011.

== Overview ==
2022 Indiana State Senate general election
Party	Votes	Percentage	% change	Seats Before	Seats Up	Candidates	Seats Won	Seats After	+/–
Republican	631,551	70.78%	▲14.18%	39	21	25	22	40	▲1
Democratic	260,751	29.22%	▼14.18%	11	4	17	3	10	▼1
Totals	892,302	100.00%	—	50	25	36	25	50	—
Source: Indiana Election Division

== Predictions ==
Source	Ranking	As of
Sabato's Crystal Ball	Safe R	May 19, 2022

== Incumbents defeated in primaries ==
=== Republicans ===
1. District 47: Kevin Boehnlein lost renomination to fellow incumbent Gary Byrne in a redistricting race.

== District 1 ==
1st district election
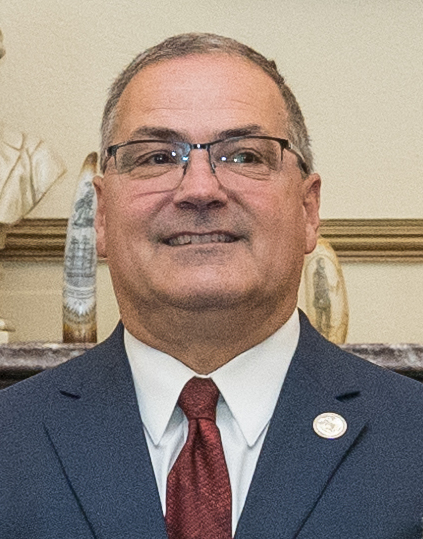

Candidate	Dan Dernulc	Michael Griffin
Party	Republican	Democratic
Popular vote	23,486	21,392
Percentage	52.3%	47.7%
- Results by precinct Dernulc: 50–60% 60–70% 70–80% Griffin: 50–60% 60–70% 70–80% 80–90% No votes
State senator before election
Michael Griffin
Democratic
Elected State senator
Dan Dernulc
Republican

The district had been represented by Democrat Frank Mrvan since 1998, but he previously held office from 1978 to 1994. Mrvan was re-elected with 63.3% of the vote in 2018. He stepped down from his seat in January 2022. Michael Griffin was chosen at the Democratic precinct caucus to replace him. Donald Trump won this district with 49.8% of the vote in the 2020 presidential election.

=== Democratic primary ===
==== Candidates ====
===== Declared =====
- Martin Del Rio, Iraq war veteran and candidate for U.S. Senate in 2018
- Michael Griffin, incumbent state senator and former Highland clerk-treasurer

Democratic primary results
Party	Candidate	Votes	%
Democratic	Michael Griffin (incumbent)	4,413	65.9
Democratic	Martin Del Rio	2,288	34.1
Total votes		6,701	100.0

=== Republican primary ===
==== Candidates ====
===== Declared =====
- Dan Dernulc, Lake County party chairman

Republican primary results
Party	Candidate	Votes	%
Republican	Dan Dernulc	5,906	100.0
Total votes		5,906	100.0

=== General election ===
District 1 results
Party	Candidate	Votes	%
Republican	Dan Dernulc	23,486	52.3
Democratic	Michael Griffin (incumbent)	21,392	47.7
Total votes		44,878	100.0
Republican gain from Democratic			

== District 4 ==
4th district election
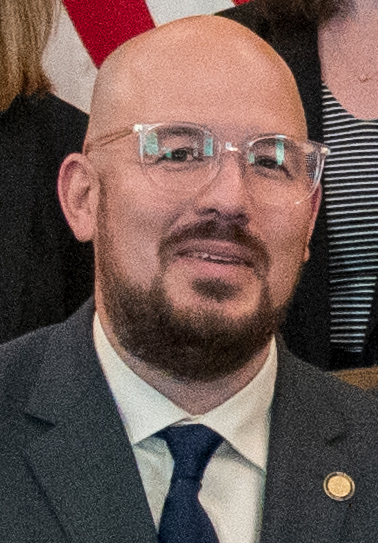

Candidate	Rodney Pol Jr.	Jeff Larson
Party	Democratic	Republican
Popular vote	20,295	18,500
Percentage	52.3%	47.7%
- Pol: 50–60% 60–70% 70–80% 80–90% 90–100% Larson: 50–60% 60–70% Tie: 50%
State senator before election
Rodney Pol Jr.
Democratic
Elected State senator
Rodney Pol Jr.
Democratic

The district had been represented by Democrat Karen Tallian since 2005. Tallian was re-elected with 60.4% of the vote in 2018. She resigned in November 2021. Rodney Pol Jr. was chosen at the Democratic precinct caucus to replace her. Joe Biden won this district with 51.0% of the vote in the 2020 presidential election.

=== Democratic primary ===
==== Candidates ====
===== Declared =====
- Deb Chubb, Michigan City School Board member
- Todd Connor, businessman
- Ron Meer, former mayor of Michigan City
- Rodney Pol Jr., incumbent state senator

=== Democratic primary ===
Democratic primary results
Party	Candidate	Votes	%
Democratic	Rodney Pol Jr. (incumbent)	3,517	44.1
Democratic	Todd Connor	2,122	26.6
Democratic	Ron Meer	1,722	21.6
Democratic	Deb Chubb	620	7.8
Total votes		7,981	100.0

=== Republican primary ===
==== Candidates ====
===== Declared =====
- Jeff Larson, Porter County councilman At-Large
- Johannes Poulard

=== Republican primary ===
Republican primary results
Party	Candidate	Votes	%
Republican	Jeff Larson	4,356	78.8
Republican	Johannes Poulard	1,174	21.2
Total votes		5,530	100.0

=== General election ===
District 4 results
Party	Candidate	Votes	%
Democratic	Rodney Pol Jr. (incumbent)	20,295	52.3
Republican	Jeff Larson	18,500	47.7
Total votes		38,795	100.0
Democratic hold			

== District 6 ==
The district had been represented by Republican Rick Niemeyer since 2014. Niemeyer was re-elected with 63.2% of the vote in 2018. He was running for re-election. Donald Trump won this district with 60.7% of the vote in the 2020 presidential election.

=== Republican primary ===
Republican primary results
Party	Candidate	Votes	%
Republican	Rick Niemeyer (incumbent)	10,434	100.0
Total votes		10,434	100.0

=== General election ===
District 6 results
Party	Candidate	Votes	%
Republican	Rick Niemeyer (incumbent)	32,366	100.0
Total votes		32,366	100.0
Republican hold			

== District 11 ==
11th district election
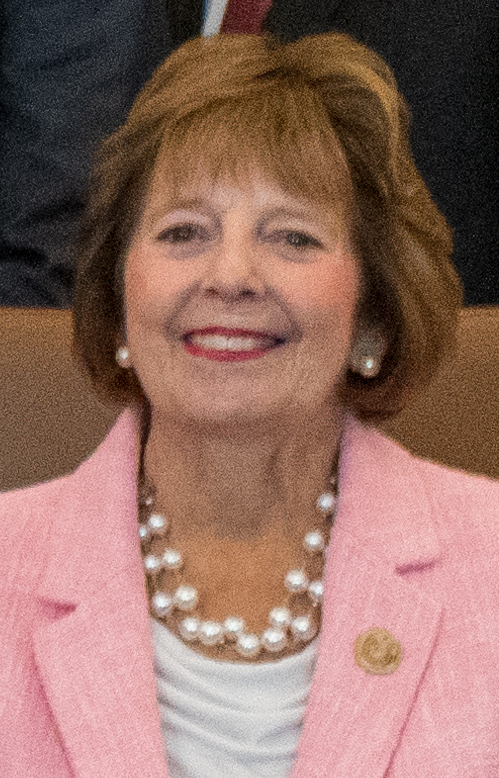

Candidate	Linda Rogers	Mindy Fountain
Party	Republican	Democratic
Popular vote	23,037	14,327
Percentage	61.7%	38.3%
- Rogers: 50–60% 60–70% 70–80% 80–90% Fountain: 50–60% 60–70% Tie: 50% No votes
State senator before election
Linda Rogers
Republican
Elected State senator
Linda Rogers
Republican

The district had been represented by Republican Linda Rogers since 2018. Rogers was elected with 61.2% of the vote in 2018. She was running for re-election. Donald Trump won this district with 54.7% of the vote in the 2020 presidential election.

=== Republican primary ===
Republican primary results
Party	Candidate	Votes	%
Republican	Linda Rogers	3,924	100.0
Total votes		3,924	100.0

=== Democratic primary ===
Democratic primary results
Party	Candidate	Votes	%
Democratic	Mindy Fountain	2,241	100.0
Total votes		2,241	100.0

=== General election ===
District 11 results
Party	Candidate	Votes	%
Republican	Linda Rogers (incumbent)	23,037	61.7
Democratic	Mindy Fountain	14,327	38.3
Total votes		37,364	100.0
Republican hold			

== District 14 ==
14th district election
Candidate	Tyler Johnson	Zach Heimach
Party	Republican	Democratic
Popular vote	18,907	10,123
Percentage	65.1%	34.9%
- County results Johnson: 60–70% 70–80%
State senator before election
Dennis Kruse
Republican
Elected State senator
Tyler Johnson
Republican

The district had been represented by Republican Dennis Kruse since 2004. Kruse was re-elected unopposed in 2018. He announced he would be retiring due to his wife's health. Physician Tyler Johnson won the Republican primary with 52.8% of the vote. Zach Heimach won in the uncontested Democratic primary. Donald Trump won this district with 59.5% of the vote in the 2020 presidential election.

=== Republican primary ===
==== Candidates ====
===== Declared =====
- Tyler Johnson, emergency physician
- Ron Turpin, businessman
- Denny Worman, candidate for state representative (85th district) in 2012, 2014 and 2016

===== Declined =====
- Dennis Kruse, incumbent state senator

=== Republican primary ===
Republican primary results
Party	Candidate	Votes	%
Republican	Tyler Johnson	5,299	52.8%
Republican	Ron Turpin	3,853	38.4%
Republican	Denny Worman	888	8.8%
Total votes		10,040	100.0

=== Democratic primary ===
==== Candidates ====
===== Declared =====
- Zach Heimach

=== Democratic primary ===
Democratic primary results
Party	Candidate	Votes	%
Democratic	Zach Heimach	1,877	100.0
Total votes		1,877	100.0

=== General election ===
District 14 results
Party	Candidate	Votes	%
Republican	Tyler Johnson	18,907	65.1
Democratic	Zach Heimach	10,123	34.9
Total votes		29,030	100.0
Republican hold			

== District 15 ==
The district had been represented by Republican Liz Brown since 2014. Brown was re-elected with 55.4% of the vote in 2018. She was running for re-election. Donald Trump won this district with 57.5% of the vote in the 2020 presidential election.

=== Republican primary ===
Republican primary results
Party	Candidate	Votes	%
Republican	Liz Brown (incumbent)	8,650	100.0
Total votes		8,650	100.0

=== General election ===
District 15
Party	Candidate	Votes	%
Republican	Liz Brown (incumbent)	29,588	100.0
Total votes		29,588	100.0
Republican hold			

== District 17 ==
17th district election
Candidate	Andy Zay	Joe Swisher
Party	Republican	Democratic
Popular vote	27,512	9,146
Percentage	75.1%	24.9%
- County results Zay: 70–80%
State senator before election
Andy Zay
Republican
Elected State senator
Andy Zay
Republican

The district had been represented by Republican Andy Zay since 2016. Zay was re-elected with 71.8% of the vote in 2018. He was running for re-election. Donald Trump won this district with 71.3% of the vote in the 2020 presidential election.

=== Republican primary ===
Republican primary results
Party	Candidate	Votes	%
Republican	Andy Zay (incumbent)	9,640	100.0
Total votes		9,640	100.0

=== General election ===
District 17
Party	Candidate	Votes	%
Republican	Andy Zay (incumbent)	27,512	75.1
Democratic	Joe Swisher	9,146	24.9
Total votes		36,658	100.0
Republican hold			

== District 19 ==
The district had been represented by Republican Travis Holdman since 2008. Holdman was re-elected unopposed in 2018. He was running for re-election. Donald Trump won this district with 67.3% of the vote in the 2020 presidential election.

=== Republican primary ===
Republican primary results
Party	Candidate	Votes	%
Republican	Travis Holdman (incumbent)	11,176	100.0
Total votes		11,176	100.0

=== General election ===
District 19
Party	Candidate	Votes	%
Republican	Travis Holdman (incumbent)	27,865	100.0
Total votes		27,865	100.0
Republican hold			

== District 21 ==
The district had been represented by Republican Jim Buck since 2008. Buck was re-elected with 65.4% of the vote in 2018. He was running for re-election. Donald Trump won this district with 61.3% of the vote in the 2020 presidential election.

=== Republican primary ===
Republican primary results
Party	Candidate	Votes	%
Republican	Jim Buck (incumbent)	7,842	100.0
Total votes		7,842	100.0

=== General election ===
District 21
Party	Candidate	Votes	%
Republican	Jim Buck (incumbent)	28,675	64.0
Democratic	Josh Lowry	16,148	36.0
Total votes		44,823	100.0
Republican hold			

== District 22 ==
The district had been represented by Republican Ron Alting since 1998. Atling was re-elected with 55.3% of the vote in 2018. He was running for re-election. Donald Trump won this district with 55.8% of the vote in the 2020 presidential election.

=== Republican primary ===
Republican primary results
Party	Candidate	Votes	%
Republican	Ron Alting (incumbent)	5,741	100.0
Total votes		5,741	100.0

=== General election ===
District 22
Party	Candidate	Votes	%
Republican	Ron Alting (incumbent)	24,342	100.0
Total votes		24,342	100.0
Republican hold			

== District 23 ==
The district had been represented by Republican Phil Boots since 2006. Boots was re-elected unopposed in 2018. The incumbent senator announced he would not seek re-election. Donald Trump won this district with 60.4% of the vote in the 2020 presidential election.

=== Republican primary ===
==== Candidates ====
===== Declared =====
- Christian Beaver
- Paula K. Copenhaver
- Spencer Deery
- Bill Webster

===== Declined =====
- Phil Boots, incumbent state senator

Republican primary results
Party	Candidate	Votes	%
Republican	Spencer Deery	3,346	30.8
Republican	Bill Webster	2,929	27.0
Republican	Paula K. Copenhaver	2,492	22.9
Republican	Christian Beaver	2,093	19.3
Total votes		10,860	100.0

=== Democratic primary ===
==== Candidates ====
===== Declared =====
- David Sanders

Democratic primary results
Party	Candidate	Votes	%
Democratic	David Sanders	2,555	100.0
Total votes		2,555	100.0

=== General election ===
District 23 results
Party	Candidate	Votes	%
Republican	Spencer Deery	20,115	63.6
Democratic	David Sanders	11,523	36.4
Total votes		31,638	100.0
Republican hold			

== District 25 ==
Incumbents Mike Gaskill and Timothy Lanane were redistricted into the same district. Lanane, who assumed office in 1997, chose to retire. Gaskill ran for re-election. Donald Trump won this district with 61.1% of the vote in the 2020 presidential election.

=== Republican primary ===
==== Candidates ====
===== Declared =====
- Mike Gaskill, incumbent state senator for 25th district
- Evan McMullen

Republican primary results
Party	Candidate	Votes	%
Republican	Mike Gaskill (incumbent)	5,925	56.1
Republican	Evan McMullen	4,637	43.9
Total votes		10,562	100.0

=== Democratic primary ===
==== Candidates ====
===== Declared =====
- Tamie Dixon-Tatum
- Aaron Higgins

===== Declined =====
- Timothy Lanane, incumbent state senator for the 26th district

Democratic primary results
Party	Candidate	Votes	%
Democratic	Tamie Dixon-Tatum	2,922	62.0
Democratic	Aaron Higgins	1,791	38.0
Total votes		4,713	100.0

=== General election ===
District 25 results
Party	Candidate	Votes	%
Republican	Mike Gaskill (incumbent)	23,967	64.1
Democratic	Tamie Dixon-Tatum	13,447	35.9
Total votes		37,414	100.0
Republican gain from Democratic			

== District 26 ==
The district had been represented by Republican Mike Gaskill since 2018. Gaskill was re-elected with 57.8% of the vote in 2018. The senator announced his intention for a second term in a different district. Donald Trump won this district with 59.3% of the vote in the 2020 presidential election.

=== Republican primary ===
==== Candidates ====
===== Declared =====
- Scott Alexander, president of the Delaware County Council
- Kat Kritsch

===== Declined =====
- Mike Gaskill, incumbent state senator (running in 25th district)

Republican primary results
Party	Candidate	Votes	%
Republican	Scott Alexander	6,888	74.4
Republican	Kat Kritsch	2,366	25.6
Total votes		9,254	100.0

=== Democratic primary ===
==== Candidates ====
===== Declared =====
- Melanie Wright, former state representative (35th district)

Democratic primary results
Party	Candidate	Votes	%
Democratic	Melanie Wright	3,608	100.0
Total votes		3,608	100.0

=== General election ===
District 26 results
Party	Candidate	Votes	%
Republican	Scott Alexander	22,566	61.0
Democratic	Melanie Wright	14,450	39.0
Total votes		37,016	100.0
Republican hold			

== District 27 ==
The district had been represented by Republican Jeff Raatz since 2014. Raatz was re-elected with 70.9% of the vote in 2018. Donald Trump won this district with 69.3% of the vote in the 2020 presidential election.

=== Republican primary ===
==== Candidates ====
===== Declared =====
- Jeff Raatz, incumbent state senator

Republican primary results
Party	Candidate	Votes	%
Republican	Jeff Raatz (incumbent)	7,213	100.0
Total votes		7,213	100.0

=== Democratic primary ===
==== Candidates ====
===== Declared =====
- Ronald Itnyre, lecturer at Indiana University East

Democratic primary results
Party	Candidate	Votes	%
Democratic	Ronald Itnyre	1,855	100.0
Total votes		1,855	100.0

=== General election ===
District 27
Party	Candidate	Votes	%
Republican	Jeff Raatz (incumbent)	26,040	71.2
Democratic	Ronald Itnyre	10,553	28.8
Total votes		36,593	100.0
Republican hold			

== District 29 ==
The district had been represented by Democrat J. D. Ford since 2018. Ford was first elected with 56.7% of the vote in 2018. Joe Biden won this district with 56.5% of the vote in the 2020 presidential election.

=== Democratic primary ===
==== Candidates ====
===== Declared =====
- J. D. Ford, incumbent state senator

Democratic primary results
Party	Candidate	Votes	%
Democratic	J.D. Ford (incumbent)	4,148	100.0
Total votes		4,148	100.0

=== Republican primary ===
==== Candidates ====
===== Declared =====
- Alex Choi

Republican primary results
Party	Candidate	Votes	%
Republican	Alex Choi	5,107	100
Total votes		5,107	100.0

=== General election ===
District 29
Party	Candidate	Votes	%
Democratic	J. D. Ford (incumbent)	22,670	51.7
Republican	Alex Choi	21,200	48.3
Total votes		43,870	100.0
Democratic hold			

== District 31 ==
The district had been represented by Republican Kyle Walker since 2020. He ran for re-election. Joe Biden won this district with 49.7% of the vote in the 2020 presidential election.

=== Republican primary ===
==== Candidates ====
===== Declared =====
- Kyle Walker, incumbent state senator

Republican primary results
Party	Candidate	Votes	%
Republican	Kyle Walker (incumbent)	5,990	100.0
Total votes		5,990	100.0

=== Democratic primary ===
==== Candidates ====
===== Declared =====
- Jocelyn Vare, Fishers city councilwoman at-large

Democratic primary results
Party	Candidate	Votes	%
Democratic	Jocelyn Vare	3,288	100.0
Total votes		3,288	100.0

=== General election ===
Polling

Poll source	Date(s) administered	Sample size (Note: Key: A – all adults RV – registered voters LV – likely voters V – unclear)	Margin of error	Kyle Walker (R)	Jocelyn Vare (D)	Undecided
Change Research (D) (Note: This poll was sponsored by Indiana Senate Democrats.)	August 9–14, 2022	552 (LV)	± 4.7%	39%	41%	19%

Results

District 31
Party	Candidate	Votes	%
Republican	Kyle Walker (incumbent)	28,397	55.4
Democratic	Jocelyn Vare	22,839	44.6
Total votes		51,236	100.0
Republican hold			

== District 38 ==
The district had been represented by Republican Jon Ford since 2014. Ford was re-elected with 55.9% of the vote in 2018. He was running for re-election. Donald Trump won this district with 61.5% of the vote in the 2020 presidential election.

=== Republican primary ===
Republican primary results
Party	Candidate	Votes	%
Republican	Jon Ford (incumbent)	10,130	100.0
Total votes		10,130	100.0

=== General election ===
District 38
Party	Candidate	Votes	%
Republican	Jon Ford (incumbent)	27,510	100.0
Total votes		27,510	100.0
Republican hold			

== District 39 ==
The district had been represented by Republican Eric Bassler since 2014. Bassler was re-elected unopposed in 2018. He was running for re-election. Donald Trump won this district with 75.6% of the vote in the 2020 presidential election.

=== Republican primary ===
Republican primary results
Party	Candidate	Votes	%
Republican	Eric Bassler (incumbent)	10,645	100.0
Total votes		10,645	100.0

=== General election ===
District 39
Party	Candidate	Votes	%
Republican	Eric Bassler (incumbent)	31,128	100.0
Total votes		31,128	100.0
Republican hold			

== District 41 ==
The district had been represented by Republican Greg Walker since 2006. Walker was re-elected with 66.6% of the vote in 2018. Donald Trump won this district with 64.7% of the vote in the 2020 presidential election.

=== Republican primary ===
==== Candidates ====
===== Declared =====
- Greg Walker, incumbent state senator

Republican primary results
Party	Candidate	Votes	%
Republican	Greg Walker (incumbent)	9,207	100.0
Total votes		9,207	100.0

=== Democratic primary ===
==== Candidates ====
===== Declared =====
- Bryan Muñoz

Democratic primary results
Party	Candidate	Votes	%
Democratic	Bryan Muñoz	1,842	100.0
Total votes		1,842	100.0

=== General election ===
District 41
Party	Candidate	Votes	%
Republican	Greg Walker (incumbent)	24,698	67.8
Democratic	Bryan Muñoz	11,729	32.2
Total votes		36,427	100.0
Republican hold			

== District 43 ==
The district had been represented by Republican Chip Perfect since 2014. Perfect was re-elected unopposed in 2018. He was running for re-election. Donald Trump won this district with 73.5% of the vote in the 2020 presidential election.

=== Republican primary ===
Republican primary results
Party	Candidate	Votes	%
Republican	Chip Perfect (incumbent)	7,052	100.0
Total votes		7,052	100.0

=== General election ===
District 43
Party	Candidate	Votes	%
Republican	Chip Perfect (incumbent)	30,804	100.0
Total votes		30,804	100.0
Republican hold			

== District 45 ==
The district had been represented by Republican Chris Garten since 2018. Garten was first elected with 62.7% of the vote in 2018. Donald Trump won this district with 57.8% of the vote in the 2020 presidential election.

=== Republican primary ===
==== Candidates ====
===== Declared =====
- Chris Garten, incumbent state senator

Republican primary results
Party	Candidate	Votes	%
Republican	Chris Garten (incumbent)	6,228	100.0
Total votes		6,228	100.0

=== Democratic primary ===
==== Candidates ====
===== Declared =====
- Nick Marshall

Democratic primary results
Party	Candidate	Votes	%
Democratic	Nick Marshall	3,615	100.0
Total votes		3,615	100.0

=== General election ===
District 45 results
Party	Candidate	Votes	%
Republican	Chris Garten (incumbent)	25,767	62.1
Democratic	Nick Marshall	15,746	37.9
Total votes		41,513	100.0
Republican hold			

== District 46 ==
The district had been represented by Republican Ron Grooms since 2010. Grooms stepped down from his seat in November 2021. Kevin Boehnlein was chosen to replace him. Joe Biden won this district with 68.8% of the vote in the 2020 presidential election.

=== Republican primary ===
==== Candidates ====
===== Declared =====
- Evan Shearin

===== Declined =====
- Kevin Boehnlein, incumbent state senator (running in 47th district)

Republican primary results
Party	Candidate	Votes	%
Republican	Evan Shearin	1,535	100.0
Total votes		1,535	100.0

=== Democratic primary ===
==== Candidates ====
===== Declared =====
- Ashley Eason, nominee for State Senate (36th district) in 2020
- Andrea Hunley, Indianapolis Public Schools principal
- Kristin Jones, Indianapolis City-County Council Councillor
- Bobby Kern, perennial candidate
- Karla Lopez Owens, employee with the Marion County Prosecutor's Office

Democratic primary results
Party	Candidate	Votes	%
Democratic	Andrea Hunley	3,142	43.9
Democratic	Kristin Jones	1,859	25.9
Democratic	Ashley Eason	1,194	16.7
Democratic	Karla Lopez Owens	893	12.5
Democratic	Bobby Kern	77	1.1
Total votes		7,165	100.0

=== General election ===
District 46 results
Party	Candidate	Votes	%
Democratic	Andrea Hunley	19,503	72.9
Republican	Evan Shearin	7,238	27.1
Total votes		26,741	100.0
Democratic gain from Republican			

== District 47 ==
The district had been represented by Republican Erin Houchin since 2014. Houchin was re-elected with 66.5% of the vote in 2018. Houchin stepped down in January 2022 to focus on running for Indiana's 9th congressional district. Gary Byrne won a caucus election and was chosen to represent the district. Donald Trump won this district with 64.6% of the vote in the 2020 presidential election.

=== Republican primary ===
==== Candidates ====
===== Declared =====
- Kevin Boehnlein, incumbent state senator for 46th district
- Gary Byrne, incumbent state senator for 47th district

===== Disqualified/Withdrew =====
- Keeley R. Stingel

===== Declined =====
- Erin Houchin, incumbent senator (running for Indiana's 9th congressional district)

Republican primary results
Party	Candidate	Votes	%
Republican	Gary Byrne (incumbent)	7,125	54.0
Republican	Kevin Boehnlein (incumbent)	6,061	46.0
Total votes		13,186	100.0

=== General election ===
District 47
Party	Candidate	Votes	%
Republican	Gary Byrne (incumbent)	28,959	66.8
Democratic	Kathleen Forte	14,404	33.2
Total votes		43,363	100.0
Republican hold			

== District 48 ==
The district had been represented by Republican Mark Messmer since 2014. Manning was re-elected unopposed in 2018. He was running for re-election. Donald Trump won this district with 69.6% of the vote in the 2020 presidential election.

=== Republican primary ===
Republican primary results
Party	Candidate	Votes	%
Republican	Mark Messmer (incumbent)	7,475	100.0
Total votes		7,475	100.0

=== General election ===
District 48
Party	Candidate	Votes	%
Republican	Mark Messmer (incumbent)	32,564	72.3
Democratic	Jeff Hill	12,456	27.7
Total votes		45,020	100.0
Republican hold			

== District 49 ==
The district had been represented by Republican Jim Tomes since 2010. Tomes was re-elected with 64.0% of the vote in 2018. He was running for re-election. Donald Trump won this district with 58.2 of the vote in the 2020 presidential election.

=== Republican primary ===
Republican primary results
Party	Candidate	Votes	%
Republican	Jim Tomes (incumbent)	4,995	100.0
Total votes		4,995	100.0

=== General election ===
District 49
Party	Candidate	Votes	%
Republican	Jim Tomes (incumbent)	26,320	100.0
Total votes		26,320	100.0
Republican hold			

== Notes ==
Partisan clients
