= 2018 Indiana Senate election =

- November 6, 2018

25 of 50 seats in the Indiana Senate 26 seats needed for a majority
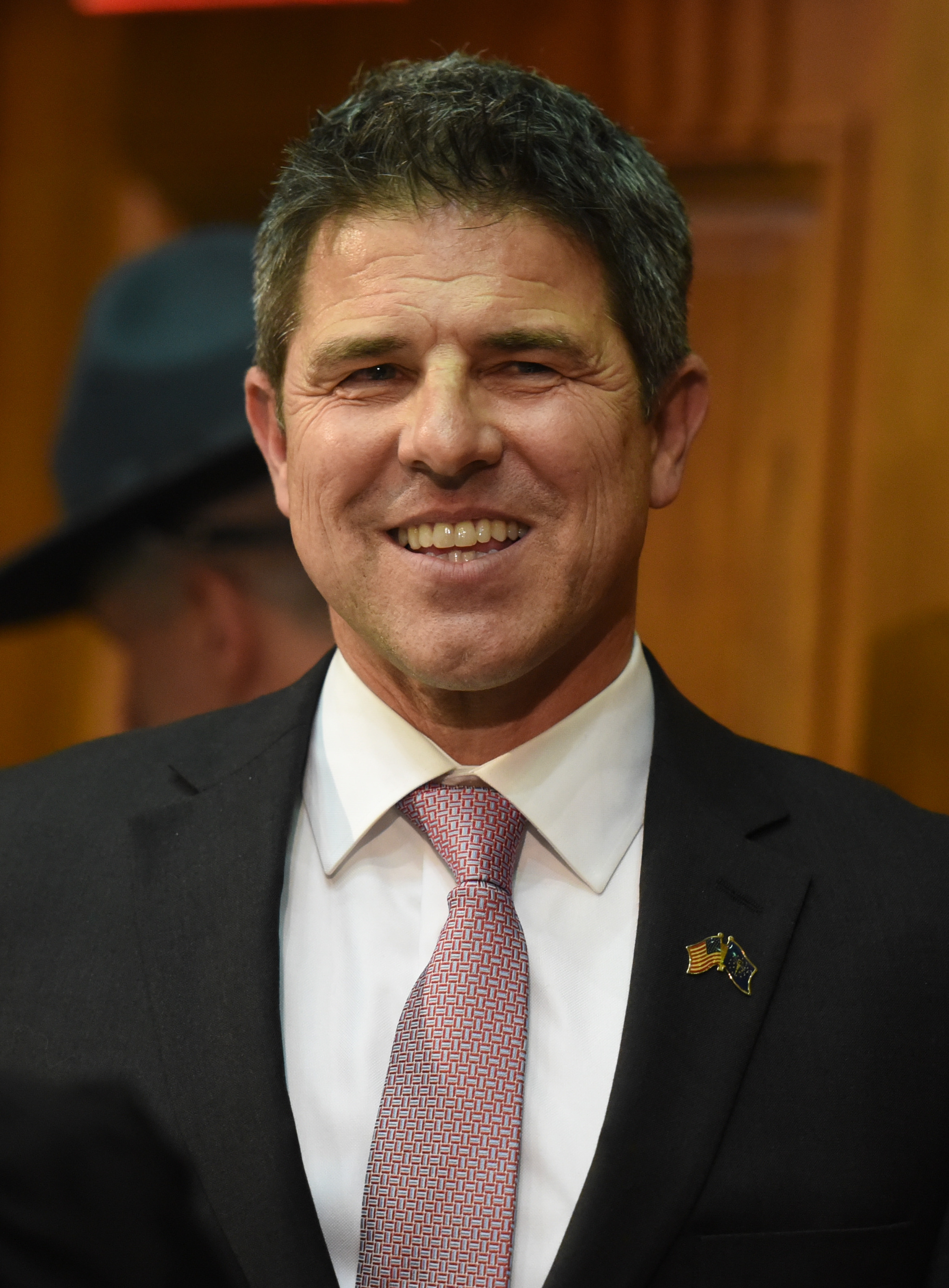

	Majority party	Minority party
Leader	Rodric Bray	Timothy Lanane
Party	Republican	Democratic
Leader's seat	37th District	25th District
Last election	41	9
Seats won	21	4
Seats after	40	10
Seat change	▼1	▲1
Popular vote	673,237	369,003
Percentage	64.31%	35.25%
- Results of the elections: Democratic gain Democratic hold Republican hold No election
President pro tempore before election
David C. Long
Republican
Elected President pro tempore
David C. Long
Republican

Elections to the Indiana Senate took place on November 6, 2018. Primary elections were held on May 8, 2018.

== Results ==
Popular vote
Republican	67.60%
Democratic	32.39%
Other	0.65%

Senate seats
Republican	80%
Democratic	20%

District	Incumbent	Party	Elected Senator	Party
1	Frank Mrvan	Dem	Frank Mrvan	Dem
4	Karen Tallian	Dem	Karen Tallian	Dem
6	Rick Niemeyer	Rep	Rick Niemeyer	Rep
11	Joe Zakas	Rep	Linda Rogers	Rep
14	Dennis Kruse	Rep	Dennis Kruse	Rep
15	Liz Brown	Rep	Liz Brown	Rep
17	Andy Zay	Rep	Andy Zay	Rep
19	Travis Holdman	Rep	Travis Holdman	Rep
21	Jim Buck	Rep	Jim Buck	Rep
22	Ronnie Alting	Rep	Ronnie Alting	Rep
23	Phil Boots	Rep	Phil Boots	Rep
25	Timothy Lanane	Dem	Timothy Lanane	Dem
26	Doug Eckerty	Rep	Mike Gaskill	Rep
27	Jeff Raatz	Rep	Jeff Raatz	Rep
29	Mike Delph	Rep	J. D. Ford	Dem
31	James W. Merritt	Rep	James W. Merritt	Rep
38	Jon Ford	Rep	Jon Ford	Rep
39	Eric Bassler	Rep	Eric Bassler	Rep
41	Greg Walker	Rep	Greg Walker	Rep
43	Chip Perfect	Rep	Chip Perfect	Rep
45	Jim Smith	Rep	Chris Garten	Rep
46	Ron Grooms	Rep	Ron Grooms	Rep
47	Erin Houchin	Rep	Erin Houchin	Rep
48	Mark Messmer	Rep	Mark Messmer	Rep
49	Jim Tomes	Rep	Jim Tomes	Rep

=== Close races ===
Two districts had a margin of victory under 10%:

1. District 31, 2.8%
2. District 25, 7.8%
3. District 46, 9%

== Retiring incumbents ==
Two incumbent senators, both Republicans, chose to not seek reelection.

- Doug Eckerty (R), District 26
- Jim Smith (R), District 45

== Incumbents defeated ==
=== In primary ===
One incumbent Republican senator ran for reelection but was defeated in the May 8 primary.

- Joe Zakas (R), District 11

== Predictions ==
Source	Ranking	As of
Governing	Safe R	October 8, 2018

== Detailed results ==
=== District 1 ===
==== Democratic primary ====
Democratic primary results
Party	Candidate	Votes	%
Democratic	Frank Mrvan (incumbent)	7,771	76.8
Democratic	Mark T. Kurowski	1,551	15.3
Democratic	Chris Kukich	801	7.9
Total votes		10,123	100.0

==== Republican primary ====
Republican primary results
Party	Candidate	Votes	%
Republican	Charles B. Kallas	3,724	100.0
Total votes		3,724	100.0

==== General election ====
Indiana's 1st State Senate district general election, 2018
Party	Candidate	Votes	%
Democratic	Frank Mrvan (incumbent)	29,578	63.3
Republican	Charles B. Kallas	17,144	36.7
Total votes		46,722	100.0
Democratic hold			

=== District 4 ===
==== Democratic primary ====
Democratic primary results
Party	Candidate	Votes	%
Democratic	Karen Tallian (incumbent)	6,289	100.0
Total votes		6,289	100.0

==== Republican primary ====
Republican primary results
Party	Candidate	Votes	%
Republican	Cole Stultz	3,596	100.0
Total votes		3,596	100.0

==== General election ====
Indiana's 4th State Senate district general election, 2018
Party	Candidate	Votes	%
Democratic	Karen Tallian (incumbent)	26,762	60.4
Republican	Cole Stultz	17,557	39.6
Total votes		44,319	100.0
Democratic hold			

=== District 6 ===
==== Republican primary ====
Republican primary results
Party	Candidate	Votes	%
Republican	Rick Niemeyer (incumbent)	8,721	100.0
Total votes		8,721	100.0

==== Democratic primary ====
Democratic primary results
Party	Candidate	Votes	%
Democratic	Ryan Farrar	5,538	100.0
Total votes		5,538	100.0

==== General election ====
Indiana's 6th State Senate district general election, 2018
Party	Candidate	Votes	%
Republican	Rick Niemeyer (incumbent)	32,354	63.2
Democratic	Ryan Farrar	18,819	36.8
Total votes		51,173	100.0
Republican hold			

=== District 11 ===
==== Republican primary ====
Republican primary results
Party	Candidate	Votes	%
Republican	Linda Rogers	5,512	64.9
Republican	Joe Zakas (incumbent)	2,982	35.1
Total votes		8,494	100.0

==== Democratic primary ====
Democratic primary results
Party	Candidate	Votes	%
Democratic	Ed Liptrap	5,765	100.0
Total votes		5,765	100.0

==== General election ====
Indiana's 11th State Senate district general election, 2018
Party	Candidate	Votes	%
Republican	Linda Rogers	27,029	61.2
Democratic	Ed Liptrap	17,179	38.8
Total votes		44,208	100.0
Republican hold			

=== District 14 ===
==== Republican primary ====
Republican primary results
Party	Candidate	Votes	%
Republican	Dennis Kruse (incumbent)	9,458	100.0
Total votes		9,458	100.0

==== General election ====
Indiana's 14th State Senate district general election, 2018
Party	Candidate	Votes	%
Republican	Dennis Kruse (incumbent)	34,352	100.0
Total votes		34,352	100.0
Republican hold			

=== District 15 ===
==== Republican primary ====
Republican primary results
Party	Candidate	Votes	%
Republican	Liz Brown (incumbent)	6,932	100.0
Total votes		6,932	100.0

==== Democratic primary ====
Democratic primary results
Party	Candidate	Votes	%
Democratic	Kathy Zoucha	4,489	100.0
Total votes		4,489	100.0

==== General election ====
Indiana's 15th State Senate district general election, 2018
Party	Candidate	Votes	%
Republican	Liz Brown (incumbent)	23,980	55.4
Democratic	Kathy Zoucha	19,321	44.6
Total votes		43,301	100.0
Republican hold			

=== District 17 ===
==== Republican primary ====
Republican primary results
Party	Candidate	Votes	%
Republican	Andy Zay (incumbent)	13,215	100.0
Total votes		13,215	100.0

==== Democratic primary ====
Democratic primary results
Party	Candidate	Votes	%
Democratic	Gary Snyder	2,491	100.0
Total votes		2,491	100.0

==== General election ====
Indiana's 17th State Senate district general election, 2018
Party	Candidate	Votes	%
Republican	Andy Zay (incumbent)	30,320	71.8
Democratic	Gary Snyder	11,911	28.2
Total votes		42,231	100.0
Republican hold			

=== District 19 ===
==== Republican primary ====
Republican primary results
Party	Candidate	Votes	%
Republican	Travis Holdman (incumbent)	11,504	76.1
Republican	Eric Orr	3,613	23.9
Total votes		15,117	100.0

==== General election ====
Indiana's 19th State Senate district general election, 2018
Party	Candidate	Votes	%
Republican	Travis Holdman (incumbent)	29,985	100.0
Total votes		29,985	100.0
Republican hold			

=== District 21 ===
==== Republican primary ====
Republican primary results
Party	Candidate	Votes	%
Republican	Jim Buck (incumbent)	11,965	100.0
Total votes		11,965	100.0

==== Democratic primary ====
Democratic primary results
Party	Candidate	Votes	%
Democratic	Christina Fivecoate	3,494	100.0
Total votes		3,494	100.0

==== General election ====
Indiana's 21st State Senate district general election, 2018
Party	Candidate	Votes	%
Republican	Jim Buck (incumbent)	29,797	65.4
Democratic	Christina Fivecoate	15,733	34.6
Total votes		45,530	100.0
Republican hold			

=== District 22 ===
==== Republican primary ====
Republican primary results
Party	Candidate	Votes	%
Republican	Ronnie Alting (incumbent)	8,376	100.0
Total votes		8,376	100.0

==== Democratic primary ====
Democratic primary results
Party	Candidate	Votes	%
Democratic	Sheryl Shipley	3,248	100.0
Total votes		3,248	100.0

==== General election ====
Indiana's 22nd State Senate district general election, 2018
Party	Candidate	Votes	%
Republican	Ronnie Alting (incumbent)	20,727	55.3
Democratic	Sheryl Shipley	16,721	44.7
Total votes		37,448	100.0
Republican hold			

=== District 23 ===
==== Republican primary ====
Republican primary results
Party	Candidate	Votes	%
Republican	Phil Boots (incumbent)	13,281	100.0
Total votes		13,281	100.0

==== General election ====
Indiana's 23rd State Senate district general election, 2018
Party	Candidate	Votes	%
Republican	Phil Boots (incumbent)	36,226	100.0
Total votes		36,226	100.0
Republican hold			

=== District 25 ===
==== Democratic primary ====
Democratic primary results
Party	Candidate	Votes	%
Democratic	Timothy Lanane (incumbent)	5,843	64.8
Democratic	Tamie Dixon-Tatum	3,170	35.2
Total votes		9,013	100.0

==== Republican primary ====
Republican primary results
Party	Candidate	Votes	%
Republican	Zaki Ali	4,454	100.0
Total votes		3,596	100.0

==== General election ====
Indiana's 25th State Senate district general election, 2018
Party	Candidate	Votes	%
Democratic	Timothy Lanane (incumbent)	19,577	51.9
Republican	Zaki Ali	16,640	44.1
Libertarian	Robert Q. Jozwiak	1,517	4.0
Total votes		37,734	100.0
Democratic hold			

=== District 26 ===
==== Republican primary ====
Republican primary results
Party	Candidate	Votes	%
Republican	Mike Gaskill	6,553	56.2
Republican	Steffanie Owens	5,115	43.8
Total votes		11,668	100.0

==== Democratic primary ====
Democratic primary results
Party	Candidate	Votes	%
Democratic	Dave Cravens	4,817	66.5
Democratic	Dave Ring	2,425	33.5
Total votes		7,242	100.0

==== General election ====
Indiana's 26th State Senate district general election, 2018
Party	Candidate	Votes	%
Republican	Mike Gaskill	27,647	57.8
Democratic	Dave Cravens	18,556	38.8
Libertarian	Greg Noland	1,625	3.4
Total votes		47,828	100.0
Republican hold			

=== District 27 ===
==== Republican primary ====
Republican primary results
Party	Candidate	Votes	%
Republican	Jeff Raatz (incumbent)	11,874	100.0
Total votes		11,874	100.0

==== Democratic primary ====
Democratic primary results
Party	Candidate	Votes	%
Democratic	Jake Hoog	2,344	100.0
Total votes		2,344	100.0

==== General election ====
Indiana's 27th State Senate district general election, 2018
Party	Candidate	Votes	%
Republican	Jeff Raatz (incumbent)	27,795	70.9
Democratic	Jake Hoog	11,429	29.1
Total votes		39,224	100.0
Republican hold			

=== District 29 ===
==== Republican primary ====
Republican primary results
Party	Candidate	Votes	%
Republican	Mike Delph (incumbent)	6,070	57.6
Republican	Corrie Meyer	4,463	42.4
Total votes		10,533	100.0

==== Democratic primary ====
Democratic primary results
Party	Candidate	Votes	%
Democratic	J.D. Ford	6,955	100.0
Total votes		6,955	100.0

==== General election ====
Indiana's 29th State Senate district general election, 2018
Party	Candidate	Votes	%
Democratic	J. D. Ford	31,974	56.7
Republican	Mike Delph (incumbent)	24,403	43.3
Total votes		56,377	100.0
Democratic gain from Republican			

=== District 31 ===
==== Republican primary ====
Republican primary results
Party	Candidate	Votes	%
Republican	James W. Merritt (incumbent)	6,283	67.4
Republican	Crystal LaMotte	3,043	32.6
Total votes		9,326	100.0

==== Democratic primary ====
Democratic primary results
Party	Candidate	Votes	%
Democratic	Derek Camp	5,885	100.0
Total votes		5,885	100.0

==== General election ====
Indiana's 31st State Senate district general election, 2018
Party	Candidate	Votes	%
Republican	James W. Merritt (incumbent)	30,221	51.4
Democratic	Derek Camp	28,612	48.6
Total votes		58,883	100.0
Republican hold			

=== District 38 ===
==== Republican primary ====
Republican primary results
Party	Candidate	Votes	%
Republican	Jon Ford (incumbent)	5,751	100.0
Total votes		5,751	100.0

==== Democratic primary ====
Democratic primary results
Party	Candidate	Votes	%
Democratic	Chris Gambill	7,320	71.2
Democratic	Maria David	2,169	21.1
Democratic	David Allen Fuchs II	785	7.7
Total votes		10,274	100.0

==== General election ====
Indiana's 38th State Senate district general election, 2018
Party	Candidate	Votes	%
Republican	Jon Ford (incumbent)	21,508	55.9
Democratic	Chris Gambill	16,969	44.1
Total votes		38,477	100.0
Republican hold			

=== District 39 ===
==== Republican primary ====
Republican primary results
Party	Candidate	Votes	%
Republican	Eric Bassler (incumbent)	12,511	100.0
Total votes		12,511	100.0

==== General election ====
Indiana's 39th State Senate district general election, 2018
Party	Candidate	Votes	%
Republican	Eric Bassler (incumbent)	34,199	
Total votes		34,199	100.0
Republican hold			

=== District 41 ===
==== Republican primary ====
Republican primary results
Party	Candidate	Votes	%
Republican	Greg Walker (incumbent)	11,881	100.0
Total votes		11,881	100.0

==== Democratic primary ====
Democratic primary results
Party	Candidate	Votes	%
Democratic	Ross Thomas	3,284	100.0
Total votes		3,284	100.0

==== General election ====
Indiana's 41st State Senate district general election, 2018
Party	Candidate	Votes	%
Republican	Greg Walker (incumbent)	28,888	66.6
Democratic	Ross Thomas	14,458	33.4
Total votes		43,346	100.0
Republican hold			

=== District 43 ===
==== Republican primary ====
Republican primary results
Party	Candidate	Votes	%
Republican	Chip Perfect (incumbent)	11,881	100.0
Total votes		11,881	100.0

==== General election ====
Indiana's 43rd State Senate district general election, 2018
Party	Candidate	Votes	%
Republican	Chip Perfect (incumbent)	35,509	100.0
Total votes		35,509	100.0
Republican hold			

=== District 45 ===
==== Republican primary ====
Republican primary results
Party	Candidate	Votes	%
Republican	Chris Garten	7,324	100.0
Total votes		7,324	100.0

==== Democratic primary ====
Democratic primary results
Party	Candidate	Votes	%
Democratic	John Perkins	6,797	100.0
Total votes		6,797	100.0

==== General election ====
Indiana's 45th State Senate district general election, 2018
Party	Candidate	Votes	%
Republican	Chris Garten	30,357	62.7
Democratic	John Perkins	16,493	34.1
Libertarian	Charles Johnson	1,554	3.2
Total votes		48,404	100.0
Republican hold			

=== District 46 ===
==== Republican primary ====
Republican primary results
Party	Candidate	Votes	%
Republican	Ron Grooms (incumbent)	6,037	100.0
Total votes		6,037	100.0

==== Democratic primary ====
Democratic primary results
Party	Candidate	Votes	%
Democratic	Anna Murray	7,031	100.0
Total votes		7,031	100.0

==== General election ====
Indiana's 46th State Senate district general election, 2018
Party	Candidate	Votes	%
Republican	Ron Grooms (incumbent)	27,012	54.5
Democratic	Anna Murray	22,571	45.5
Total votes		49,583	100.0
Republican hold			

=== District 47 ===
==== Republican primary ====
Republican primary results
Party	Candidate	Votes	%
Republican	Erin Houchin (incumbent)	10,935	100.0
Total votes		10,935	100.0

==== Democratic primary ====
Democratic primary results
Party	Candidate	Votes	%
Democratic	Nick Siler	5,973	100.0
Total votes		5,973	100.0

==== General election ====
Indiana's 47th State Senate district general election, 2018
Party	Candidate	Votes	%
Republican	Erin Houchin (incumbent)	31,853	66.5
Democratic	Nick Siler	16,064	33.5
Total votes		47,917	100.0
Republican hold			

=== District 48 ===
==== Republican primary ====
Republican primary results
Party	Candidate	Votes	%
Republican	Mark Messmer (incumbent)	12,404	100.0
Total votes		12,404	100.0

==== General election ====
Indiana's 48th State Senate district general election, 2018
Party	Candidate	Votes	%
Republican	Mark Messmer (incumbent)	38,824	100.0
Total votes		38,824	100.0
Republican hold			

=== District 49 ===
==== Republican primary ====
Republican primary results
Party	Candidate	Votes	%
Republican	Jim Tomes (incumbent)	6,869	100.0
Total votes		6,869	100.0

==== Democratic primary ====
Democratic primary results
Party	Candidate	Votes	%
Democratic	Edie Hardcastle	3,058	100.0
Total votes		3,058	100.0

==== General election ====
Indiana's 49th State Senate district general election, 2018
Party	Candidate	Votes	%
Republican	Jim Tomes (incumbent)	28,895	64.0
Democratic	Edie Hardcastle	16,276	36.0
Total votes		45,171	100.0
Republican hold			
