= Indiana Democratic Party =

Indiana affiliate of the U.S. Democratic Party

- Chairperson: Karen Tallian
- House Minority Leader: Phil GiaQuinta
- Senate Minority Leader: Shelli Yoder
- Founded: 1816; 210 years ago
- Headquarters: 101 W. Washington Street, Suite 1110E, Indianapolis, IN 46204
- Student wing: College Democrats of Indiana; Indiana Young Democrats
- Ideology: Liberalism (US); Faction: Progressivism (US)
- National affiliation: Democratic Party
- Colors: Blue
- Seats in the U.S. Senate: 0 / 2
- Seats in the U.S. House: 3 / 9
- Statewide Executive Offices: 2 / 7
- Seats in the Indiana State Senate: 15 / 50
- Seats in the Indiana House of Representatives: 46 / 100

Election symbol

Website
- www.indems.org

The Indiana Democratic Party is the affiliate of the Democratic Party in the U.S. state of Indiana. The party's chair is Karen Tallian.

The party has weak electoral power in the state. As of 2025 it holds no statewide offices and two of Indiana's nine congressional seats. Democrats have won Indiana at the presidential level five times since 1900: 1912, 1932, 1936, 1964 and 2008.

In the 2026 elections, the Democratic Party experienced a major resurgence in Indiana, flipping 16 seats in the State House, breaking the Republican supermajority that had existed in the chamber since 2012 and nearly flipping control of the chamber outright, and gaining five seats in the State Senate, in addition to two statewide offices and the state's 5th congressional district. Democrats also won a majority of votes in the 2026 U.S. House elections in the state.

== History and important figures ==
=== Statehood era ===
The Indiana Democratic Party has its roots in the work of Jonathan Jennings, Democratic-Republican and first governor of the newly formed state of Indiana in 1816. Jennings pushed hard for statehood, and is attributed as an intellectual father of the Indiana Democratic Party. He pushed for a statewide school system and a stable state bank.

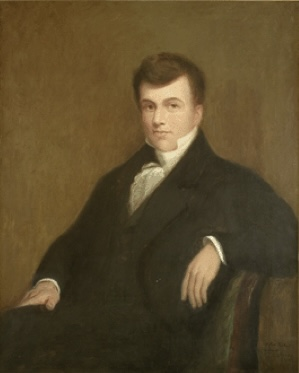
Jonathan Jennings

=== Civil War era ===
Indiana political parties in the 19th century were extremely divided culturally. Indiana, more than any other Midwestern state, received an influx of southern farmers who didn't mix well with northern manufacturers and businessmen. Patronage was given out regularly as Democratic and Whig (and eventually Republican) politicians fought for control of state government. Whigs predominantly controlled the state legislature, while Democrats predominantly controlled the governorship. Turbulent elections and heated Democratic passion ended up persuading 50 Whig legislators to switch parties by 1852. Even though William Henry Harrison, a Whig and one of the first governors of the Indiana territory, ran for president in 1840, Democrats like Joseph Chapman were very critical of him and his supporters.

The first Indiana Democratic Party meeting was held in 1848, and at the time was called the "Indiana State Central Committee of the Democratic Party". Only seven men were in attendance. Thomas Hendricks, nephew of the third governor of Indiana, became the first post-war Democrat to be elected governor in a Northern state. His popular bipartisan leadership would eventually lead him to be President Grover Cleveland's first vice president from March to November 1885.

=== 20th century ===
As the city of Indianapolis grew into a massive urban area, Democrats began to continuously represent the city in the state legislature. Thomas Taggart, the mayor of Indianapolis from 1895 to 1901, became the first Hoosier to become chairman of the Democratic National Committee. In 1913, Thomas Marshall, Governor of Indiana, became yet another Democratic Hoosier to be a vice president (under Woodrow Wilson). Marshall is perhaps best known for his humorous quote as vice president, said on the Senate floor: "What this country needs is a really good five-cent cigar."

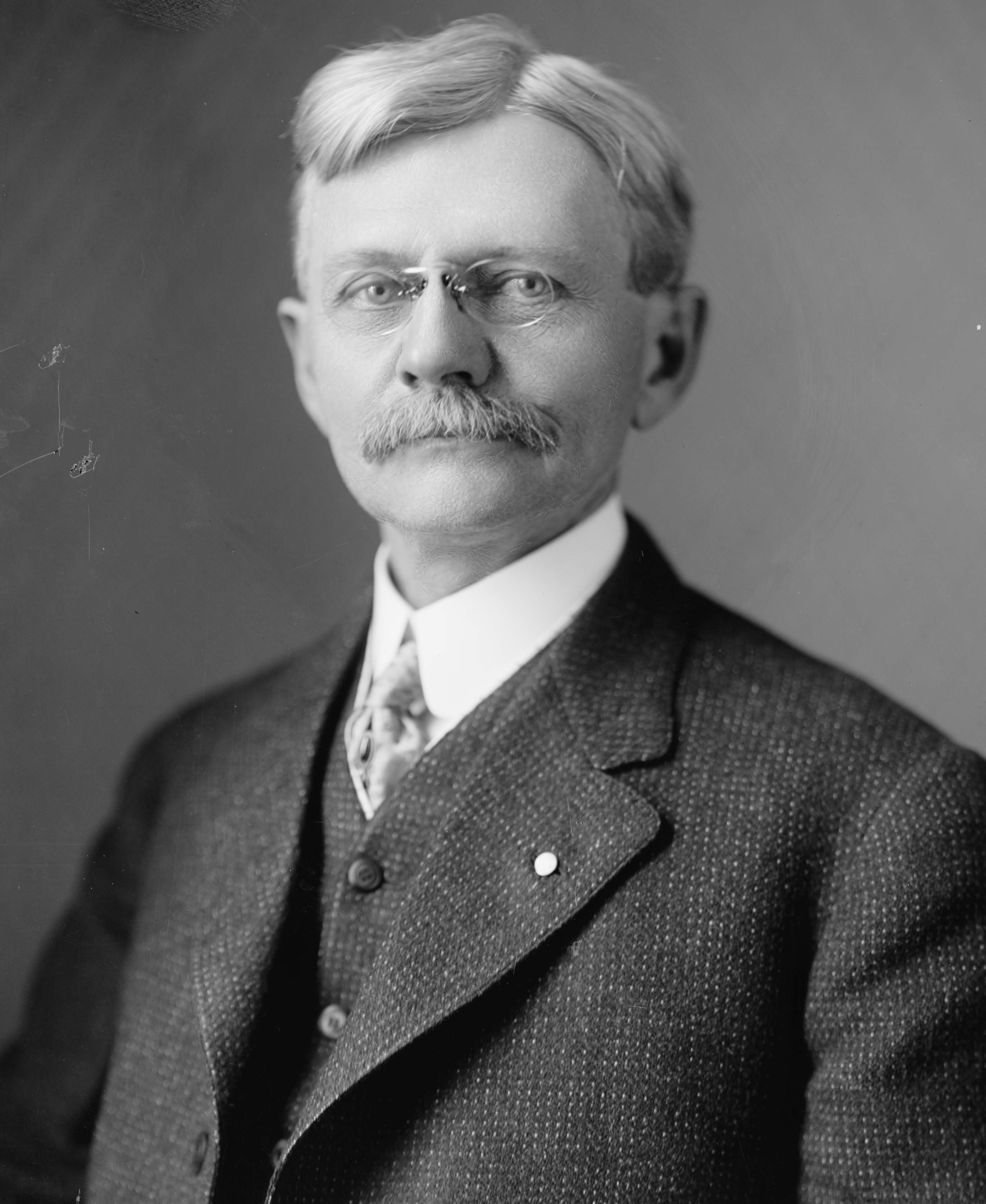
Thomas Riley Marshall headshot

Years later, World War II veteran Frank McKinney became a delegate in the 1948 Democratic Convention, and later became the second Hoosier to be Chairman of the Democratic National Committee in 1951.

In the 1980s, Evan Bayh became a popular figure within the Indiana Democratic Party as well as the state of Indiana. A young governor elected in 1988, Bayh was later elected to the U.S. Senate in 1998. Bayh's two terms as governor, along with his lieutenant governor Frank O'Bannon's own gubernatorial years, resulted in a budget surplus, tax cuts and increased funding for education and health insurance for the poor. Long considered a moderate, Bayh was rumored to be a top pick for Barack Obama's vice presidential nominee in 2008, but the spot ended up going to Delaware senator Joe Biden.

=== 21st century ===
Following O'Bannon's death in 2003, Lieutenant Governor Joe Kernan succeeded him in office. Kernan lost the 2004 gubernatorial election to Republican Mitch Daniels, ending sixteen years of Democratic control of the Governor's Mansion. Democrats lost attempts to regain the office in 2008, 2012 (when former Speaker of the State House of Representatives John Gregg narrowly lost to U.S. representative and future vice president Mike Pence), and 2016 (when Gregg was again defeated, despite leading in the polls heading into election day).

Bayh, who had represented Indiana in the U.S. Senate since 1999, was reelected overwhelmingly in 2004 even as Republican George W. Bush carried the state in the presidential race. Bayh declined run again in 2010, resulting in Republicans gaining the seat, and was defeated in his bid for a non-consecutive third term in 2016. Republican control of both U.S. Senate seats from Indiana was ended when Joe Donnelly won the 2012 election, defeating controversial Republican candidate Richard Mourdock. Donnelly sought reelection in 2018, campaigning on his willingness to compromise with President Donald Trump, but was defeated by Mike Braun.

The latest Democrat, to have garnered national recognition, was Pete Buttigieg, for his presidential bid in the 2020 Democratic Party presidential primaries. He received 21 pledged delegates, the first openly gay candidate to ever win so many. He suspended his campaign on March 1, 2020, after a poor showing in the 2020 South Carolina Democratic presidential primary.

Democratic candidate J. D. Ford became the first openly gay Hoosier elected to the Indiana Senate following his 2018 victory over Mike Delph, to whom he had narrowly lost a State Senate bid four years earlier.

State Senator Greg Taylor became the first Black lawmaker elected as leader of an Indiana legislative caucus on November 6, 2020. He succeeded Timothy Lanane as Minority Leader in the Indiana State Senate.

== 2011 walk-out ==
In February 2011, 37 out of 40 House Democrats refused to show up to a legislative session in protest of a Republican "right-to-work" bill, which would allow workers represented by labor unions to refuse to pay "agency fees" to pay for the benefits and protections provided by the union. With the Republicans in the majority, Democrats feared that what they consider to be a radical bill would be easily passed, and many of them relocated across the border in Urbana, Illinois. The move largely took a cue from Indiana's counterparts in Wisconsin, where Democratic lawmakers there hid out in Illinois in protest of a controversial public-sector union bill in the same month.

The Indiana Democratic caucus released a statement on the matter, saying that "By staying here, we will be giving the people of Indiana a chance to find out more about this radical agenda and speak out against it." Republican governor Mitch Daniels, who had previously urged Republican lawmakers not to pursue a right-to-work bill during that legislative session, stated his hope that Democrats would return to do their jobs. Daniels supported the bill, but not the political timing of it, as it would distract from other parts of his legislative agenda he wanted to focus on.

In early March 2011, Democrats faced a choice of either returning to the state, or paying a daily fine of $250. The Indiana Constitution allows such fines as a way of compelling missing lawmakers to return. Such a tactic was employed as an alternative to sending state troopers after runaway legislators, which Governor Daniels declined to do. Lawmakers returned in six weeks, after they had been reassured that the right-to-work bill would not be on the legislative docket for that session. The bill was passed and signed into law the following year.

== Modern party structure and rules ==
The Democratic Party of Indiana is administered by several executive positions at the head of the state party committee. John Zody is the Committee Chair, Cordelia Lewis-Burks the Vice Chair, Vera Mileusnic the Secretary and Sherrianne Standley the treasurer. There are 26 official rules for the Indiana Democratic Party, as of the current party rule charter, written in 2011.

Under Rule 1, party structure is defined as consisting of multiple layers of committees, including (in order from less to more localized) a state central committee, congressional district committees, county committees and precinct committees. Towns, cities, townships and wards may create their own committees as needed.

The charter ensures gender equality, open access to party meetings by party members, and lays out eligibility requirements for membership in the state Democratic Party. The state central committee has ultimate authority over all of the rules as well as local committees. Three party members are elected as National Committeepersons for four-year terms to serve on the Democratic National Committee, along with the state chair and vice chair. The state chair calls for a state party convention biennially, where rules of the party are drafted and amended. Delegates are selected through a process to attend the convention.

== Elected Democrats in Indiana ==
=== Members of Congress ===
==== U.S. Senate ====
- None

Both of Indiana's U.S. Senate seats have been held by Republicans since 2019. Joe Donnelly was the last Democrat to represent Indiana in the U.S. Senate. First elected in 2012, Donnelly subsequently lost his bid for a second term in 2018 to Mike Braun.

==== U.S. House of Representatives ====
Out of the 9 seats Indiana is apportioned in the U.S. House of Representatives, two are held by Democrats. A third, J.D. Ford, was elected in 2026, to take office in January 2027.

District	Member	Photo
1st	Frank J. Mrvan	
7th	André Carson	

==== Statewide offices ====
In 2026 two Democrats were elected to state offices: Beau Bayh as Secretary of State and Jessica Bailey as Comptroller. Their terms start in January, 2027.

Indiana had not elected any Democratic candidates to statewide office since 2012, when Glenda Ritz was elected as Superintendent of Public Instruction and Joe Donnelly was elected to the U.S. Senate. In 2016, Ritz was defeated in her bid for a second term by Republican challenger Jennifer McCormick.

=== State legislative leaders ===
- Senate Minority Leader: Shelli Yoder
- House Minority Leader: Phil GiaQuinta
- House Minority Floor Leader: Cherrish Pryor
- House Minority Caucus Leader: Carey Hamilton

==== Democrats in State Senate ====
- District 2: Lonnie Randolph
- District 3: Eddie Melton
- District 4: Rodney Pol Jr.
- District 10: David Niezgodski
- District 29: J. D. Ford
- District 30: Fady Qaddoura
- District 33: Greg Taylor
- District 34: La Keisha Jackson
- District 40: Shelli Yoder (Minority Leader)

==== Democrats in State Legislature ====
- District 1: Carolyn Jackson
- District 2: Earl Harris
- District 3: Ragen Hatcher
- District 6: Maureen Bauer
- District 8: Ryan Dvorak
- District 9: Patricia Boy
- District 10: Chuck Moseley
- District 12: Mike Andrade
- District 14: Vernon Smith
- District 26: Chris Campbell
- District 27: Sheila Klinker
- District 32: Victoria Wilburn
- District 34: Sue Errington
- District 36: Terri Austin
- District 43: Tonya Pfaff
- District 61: Matt Pierce
- District 71: Wendy Dant Chesser
- District 77: Alex Burton
- District 80: Phil GiaQuinta (Minority Leader)
- District 82: Kyle Miller
- District 86: Ed DeLaney
- District 87: Carey Hamilton
- District 89: Mitch Gore
- District 92: Renee Pack
- District 94: Cherrish Pryor
- District 95: John Bartlett
- District 96: Greg Porter
- District 97: Justin Moed
- District 98: Robin Shackleford
- District 99: Vanessa Summers
- District 100: Blake Johnson

==== Mayors ====
For a full list, see the Indiana Democratic Party website

- Indianapolis: Joe Hogsett (1)
- Fort Wayne: Sharon Tucker (2)
- Evansville: Stephanie Terry (3)
- South Bend: James Mueller (4)
- Bloomington: Kerry Thomson (7)
- Hammond: Thomas McDermott Jr. (8)
- Lafayette: Tony Roswarski (9)
- Gary: Eddie Melton (11)
- Terre Haute: Brandon Sakbun (15)
- Anderson: Thomas Broderick (16)
- Elkhart: Rod Roberson (17)

== Democratic presidential victories in Indiana ==
- 1828: Andrew Jackson
- 1832: Andrew Jackson
- 1844: James K. Polk
- 1848: Lewis Cass
- 1852: Franklin Pierce
- 1856: James Buchanan
- 1876: Samuel Tilden
- 1884: Grover Cleveland
- 1892: Grover Cleveland
- 1912: Woodrow Wilson
- 1932: Franklin D. Roosevelt
- 1936: Franklin D. Roosevelt
- 1964: Lyndon B. Johnson
- 2008: Barack Obama

== Election results ==
=== Federal ===
==== U.S. House ====
Election	Votes	%	Seats (IN)	±	%
2016	1,052,901	39.61	2 / 9	0	2.16
2018	1,000,104	44.33	2 / 9	0	4.72
2020	1,194,901	39.88	2 / 9	0	4.45
2022	716,348	38.58	2 / 9	0	1.30
2024	1,103,484	38.47	2 / 9	0	0.11
2026	996,768	51.40	3 / 9	▲1	12.93

=== State ===
==== Executive offices ====
Governor
Election	Gubernatorial candidate/ticket	Votes	%	Result
1960	Matthew E. Welsh	1,072,717	50.39%	Won ✓
1964	Roger D. Branigin	1,164,620	56.18%	Won ✓
1968	Robert L. Rock	965,816	47.13%	Lost ✓
1972	Matthew E. Welsh	900,489	42.46%	Lost ✗
1976	Larry A Conrad	927,243	42.63%	Lost ✗
1980	John A. Hillenbrand II	913,116	41.92%	Lost ✗
1984	Wayne Townsend/Ann DeLaney	1,036,922	47.18%	Lost ✗
1988	Evan Bayh/Frank O'Bannon	1,138,574	53.18%	Won ✓
1992	Evan Bayh/Frank O'Bannon	1,382,151	62.01%	Won ✓
1996	Frank O'Bannon/Joe Kernan	11,087,128	51.52%	Won ✓
2000	Frank O'Bannon/Joe Kernan	1,232,525	56.56%	Won ✓
2004	Joe Kernan/Kathy Davis	1,113,900	45.49%	Lost ✗
2008	Jill Long Thompson/Dennie Oxley	1,082,463	40.04%	Lost ✗
2012	John R. Gregg/Vi Simpson	1,200,016	46.56%	Lost ✗
2016	John R. Gregg/Christina Hale	1,235,503	45.42%	Lost ✗
2020	Woody Myers/Linda Lawson	968,094	32.05%	Lost ✗
2024	Jennifer McCormick/Terry Goodin	1,183,741	41.11%	Lost ✗

== See also ==
- Category:Government of Indiana
- Political party strength in Indiana
