= Allie Craycraft =

American politician

Member of the Indiana Senate from the 26th district
- In office 1978–2006
- Preceded by: Rodney E. Piper
- Succeeded by: Sue Errington

Personal details
- Born: May 30, 1932 (age 94) Mount Sterling, Kentucky, U.S.
- Party: Democratic
- Spouse: Juanita
- Children: seven
- Occupation: Hydra-matic; Pastor

Allie V. Craycraft, Jr. (born May 30, 1932) is an American former politician from the state of Indiana. A Democrat, he served in the Indiana State Senate from 1978 to 2006.

Craycraft is currently an Associate Pastor at the Illuminate Church in Muncie. In 2016, he was elected as the Delaware County Democratic Party Chairman. His son, Steve, currently serves as Delaware County Auditor
