= Senator Gaskill =

Senator Gaskill may refer to:

- E. Thurman Gaskill (1935–2023), Iowa State Senate
- Mike Gaskill (fl. 2010s–2020s), Indiana State Senate
