= Glenn L. Howard =

American politician

Member of the Indiana Senate from the 33rd district
- In office 1992–2009
- Succeeded by: Greg Taylor

Personal details
- Born: 25 August 1939
- Died: 2 July 2012 (aged 72)
- Party: Democratic
- Spouse: Florence
- Occupation: community and media affairs

Glenn L. Howard (25 August 1939 – 2 July 2012) was a Democratic member of the Indiana Senate, representing the 33rd District from 1992 to 2009.
