= Scott Alexander (Indiana politician) =

American politician

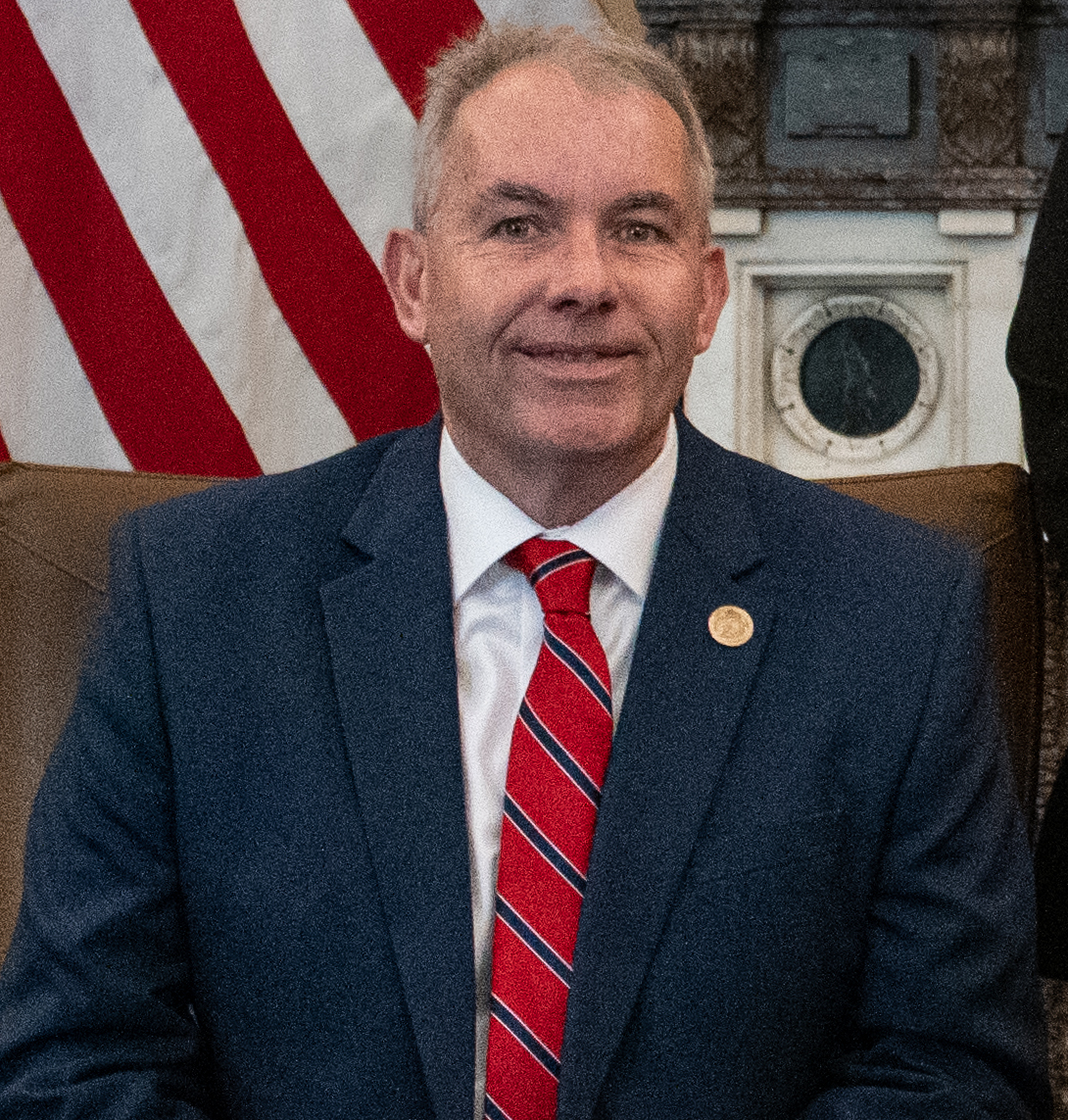

Member of the Indiana Senate from the 26th district
- Incumbent
- Assumed office November 9, 2022
- Preceded by: Mike Gaskill

Personal details
- Party: Republican
- Spouse: Valerie
- Children: 2

Scott Alexander is an American Republican politician. As of 2025 he was serving the 26th district in the Indiana Senate. He was elected to the position in the 2022 election against Democratic opponent Melanie Wright. He currently serves on three committees: Judiciary, Local Government, and Natural Resources.

Alexander owns Alexander & Company Real Estate Appraisers. He graduated from Delta High School in 1984.
