= Grabill, Indiana =

- Town
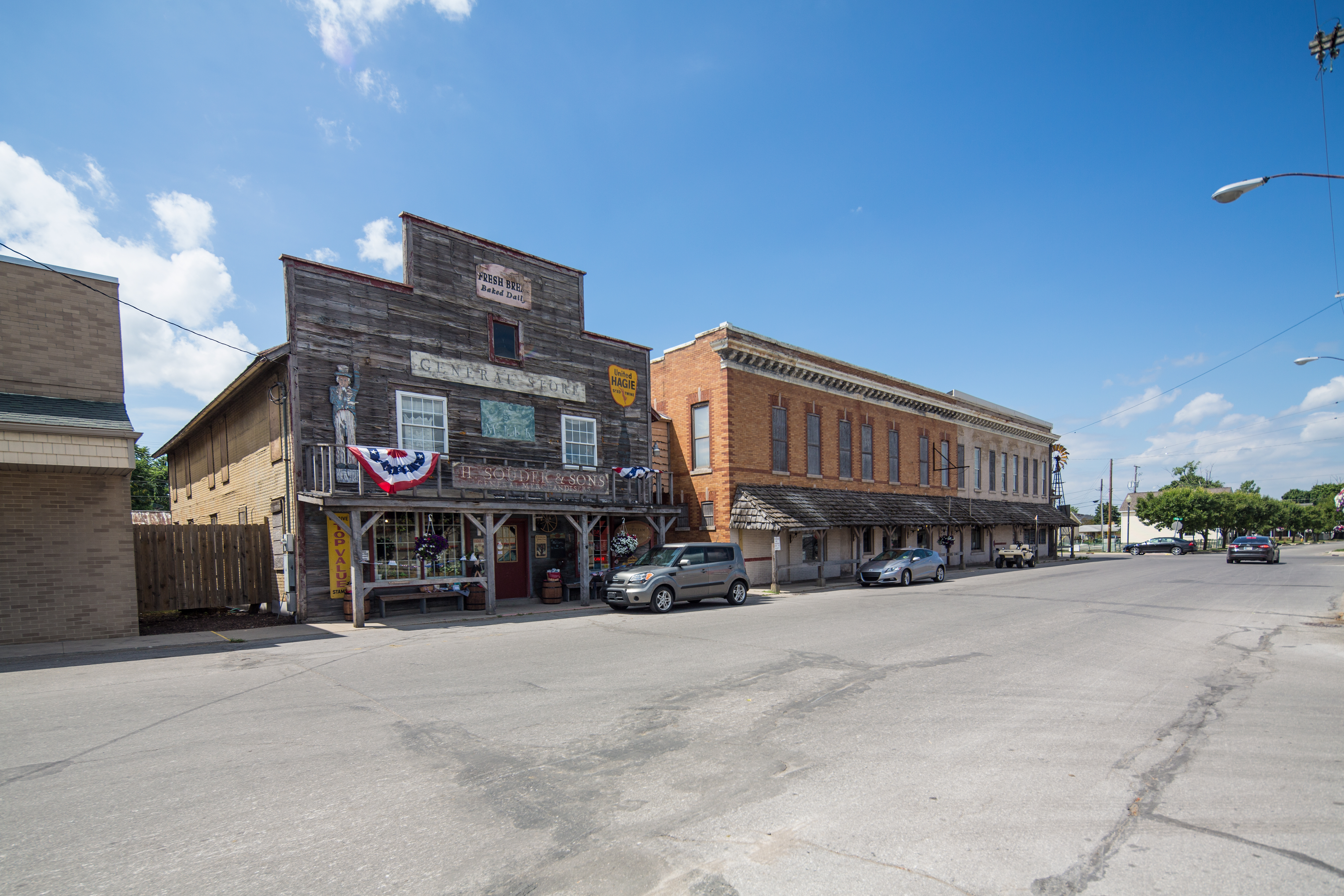
- Downtown Grabill

- Seal

- Location of Grabill in Allen County, Indiana.
- Coordinates: 41°12′36″N 84°58′6″W
- Country: United States
- State: Indiana
- County: Allen
- Township: Cedar Creek
- Named for: Joseph A. Grabill

Area
  - Total: 0.65 sq mi (1.68 km^{2})
  - Land: 0.65 sq mi (1.68 km^{2})
  - Water: 0 sq mi (0.00 km^{2})
- Elevation: 817 ft (249 m)

Population (2020)
  - Total: 1,112
  - Density: 1,711.5/sq mi (660.82/km^{2})
- Time zone: UTC-5 (EST)
  - Summer (DST): UTC-5 (EST)
- ZIP code: 46741
- Area code: 260
- FIPS code: 18-28494
- GNIS feature ID: 0435251
- Website: townofgrabill.in.gov

Grabill is a town in Cedar Creek Township, Allen County, Indiana, United States. The population was 1,112 at the 2020 census. It is known for the presence of antique stores and Amish farms. An incorporated town, Grabill has two community parks within the corporate limits.

== History ==
Grabill was platted on February 15, 1902. Later that same year, a post office was established in Grabill. In 1912, Grabill became officially incorporated as a town.

Grabill had its beginnings as a town when the Wabash Railroad was extended to that point. Grabill was named after its first postmaster, Joseph A. Grabill.

== Geography ==
Grabill is located at 41°12′36″N 84°58′6″W (41.210049, -84.968358). According to the 2010 census, Grabill has a total area of 0.6 square miles (1.55 km^{2}), all land.

== Demographics ==
Historical population
Census	Pop.	Note	%±
1930	276		—
1940	288		4.3%
1950	370		28.5%
1960	495		33.8%
1970	570		15.2%
1980	658		15.4%
1990	751		14.1%
2000	1,113		48.2%
2010	1,053		−5.4%
2020	1,112		5.6%
U.S. Decennial Census

=== 2020 census ===
As of the 2020 census, Grabill had a population of 1,112. The median age was 33.8 years. 27.6% of residents were under the age of 18 and 13.3% of residents were 65 years of age or older. For every 100 females there were 91.7 males, and for every 100 females age 18 and over there were 85.5 males age 18 and over.

0.0% of residents lived in urban areas, while 100.0% lived in rural areas.

There were 430 households in Grabill, of which 36.5% had children under the age of 18 living in them. Of all households, 49.1% were married-couple households, 16.5% were households with a male householder and no spouse or partner present, and 28.4% were households with a female householder and no spouse or partner present. About 27.2% of all households were made up of individuals and 9.7% had someone living alone who was 65 years of age or older.

There were 464 housing units, of which 7.3% were vacant. The homeowner vacancy rate was 1.4% and the rental vacancy rate was 5.6%.

Racial composition as of the 2020 census
Race	Number	Percent
White	1,007	90.6%
Black or African American	9	0.8%
American Indian and Alaska Native	5	0.4%
Asian	3	0.3%
Native Hawaiian and Other Pacific Islander	0	0.0%
Some other race	19	1.7%
Two or more races	69	6.2%
Hispanic or Latino (of any race)	47	4.2%

=== 2010 census ===
At the 2010 census there were 1,053 people, 403 households, and 276 families living in the town. The population density was 1,755.0 inhabitants per square mile (677.6/km^{2}). There were 443 housing units at an average density of 738.3 per square mile (285.1/km^{2}). The racial makup of the town was 96.8% White, 0.6% African American, 0.7% Native American, 0.5% Asian, 0.3% from other races, and 1.2% from two or more races. Hispanic or Latino of any race were 1.6%.

Of the 403 households 37.7% had children under the age of 18 living with them, 52.4% were married couples living together, 13.9% had a female householder with no husband present, 2.2% had a male householder with no wife present, and 31.5% were non-families. 27.5% of households were one person and 9.9% were one person aged 65 or older. The average household size was 2.61 and the average family size was 3.22.

The median age in the town was 32.8 years. 30.9% of residents were under the age of 18; 7.2% were between the ages of 18 and 24; 28.9% were from 25 to 44; 21.7% were from 45 to 64; and 11.3% were 65 or older. The gender makeup of the town was 48.1% male and 51.9% female.

=== 2000 census ===
At the 2000 census there were 1,113 people, 420 households, and 307 families living in the town. The population density was 1,805.1 inhabitants per square mile (697.0/km^{2}). There were 442 housing units at an average density of 716.9 per square mile (276.8/km^{2}). The racial makup of the town was 98.65% White, 0.18% Native American, 0.27% Asian, 0.09% from other races, and 0.81% from two or more races. Hispanic or Latino of any race were 0.99%.

Of the 420 households 45.0% had children under the age of 18 living with them, 57.6% were married couples living together, 12.1% had a female householder with no husband present, and 26.9% were non-families. 24.5% of households were one person and 8.8% were one person aged 65 or older. The average household size was 2.65 and the average family size was 3.19.

The age distribution was 32.3% under the age of 18, 7.7% from 18 to 24, 33.8% from 25 to 44, 17.3% from 45 to 64, and 9.0% 65 or older. The median age was 31 years. For every 100 females, there were 92.6 males. For every 100 females age 18 and over, there were 84.8 males.

The median household income was $42,240 and the median family income was $48,500. Males had a median income of $36,293 versus $24,688 for females. The per capita income for the town was $17,252. About 5.5% of families and 8.2% of the population were below the poverty line, including 12.4% of those under age 18 and 3.2% of those age 65 or over.

== Education ==
The town is served by East Allen County Schools: Cedarville Elementary School, Leo Elementary School, and Leo Junior/Senior High School.

Grabill has a public library, a branch of the Allen County Public Library.

== Notable people ==
- Mark Souder, U.S. representative from Indiana
- Tyler Johnson, Indiana state senator
