= Sue Errington =

American politician from Indiana

Member of the Indiana House of Representatives from the 34th district
- Incumbent
- Assumed office 2012
- Preceded by: Mike White

Member of the Indiana Senate from the 26th district
- In office 2006–2010
- Preceded by: Allie Craycraft
- Succeeded by: Doug Eckerty

Personal details
- Born: 1942 (age 83–84) Kosciusko County, Indiana
- Party: Democratic
- Spouse: Paul Erringon (m. 1967; died 2016)
- Education: Indiana University (BS); University of Michigan (MA)
- Profession: Educator, Public policy director

Sue E. Errington (born 1942) is a Democratic member of the Indiana House of Representatives representing District 34 (Muncie). She is a former member of the Indiana Senate, representing the 26th District from 2006 to 2010. Prior to holding elected office she served 17 years as the Public Policy Director for Planned Parenthood of Indiana. Sue was married to Dr. Paul Errington, a professor emeritus of physics at Ball State University who died in 2016 and has two adult children.
