= Doug Eckerty =

American politician

Member of the Indiana Senate from the 26th district
- In office 2010–2018
- Preceded by: Sue Errington
- Succeeded by: Mike Gaskill

Personal details
- Born: 1954 (age 71–72) Indianapolis, Indiana, U.S.
- Party: Republican
- Spouse: Ronda
- Education: Ball State University (BS)

Doug Eckerty (born 1954) is an American politician who served as a member of the Indiana Senate for the 26th district from 2010 to 2018. He is a member of the Citizens of Delaware County for Property Tax Repeal. In 2017, Eckerty announced that he would not seek re-election to the Senate. He was succeeded by fellow Republican Mike Gaskill.
