= J. D. Ford =

American politician (born 1982)

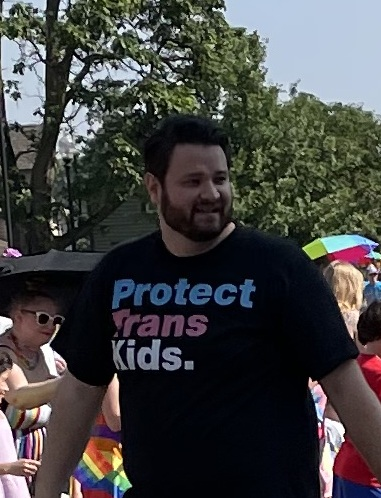
- Ford in 2023

Member-elect of the U.S. House of Representatives from Indiana's 5th district
- Assuming office January 3, 2027
- Succeeding: Victoria Spartz

Member of the Indiana Senate from the 29th district
- In office November 7, 2018 – November 4, 2026
- Preceded by: Mike Delph
- Succeeded by: Kristina Moorhead

Personal details
- Born: November 6, 1982 (age 44) Youngstown, Ohio, U.S.
- Party: Democratic
- Education: University of Akron (BS); Purdue University, Northwest (MEd)

James David Ford (born November 6, 1982) is an American politician, currently a member of the Indiana Senate. He is the representative-elect for Indiana's 5th congressional district, defeating Republican incumbent Victoria Spartz in the general election in 2026.

Elected to the state senate in 2018, he represents District 29, including portions of Carmel, Zionsville and Indianapolis as a member of the Democratic Party. He earned a bachelor's degree from University of Akron in criminal justice and political science and a master's degree in education from Purdue University Northwest.

He was the first and, as of 2025, the only openly LGBT person elected to Indiana's state legislature. He defeated Spartz in a district that had been drawn to protect her; it had been made significantly more Republican after she narrowly won her first term in 2020. After inauguration, he will be the first openly gay representative from Indiana to the United States House of Representatives. His win will also make him the first Democrat to hold this seat since it moved to Indianapolis's northern suburbs in 1983.

Ford owed his win to carrying his home county of Hamilton County with 55 percent of the vote. His win was part of a Democratic surge in the county, long a bastion of suburban conservatism.

He first ran for Indiana Senate District 29 in 2014 and lost to Republican incumbent Mike Delph but won four years later in a rematch.

In November 2020, he was elected as the Caucus Chair of the Indiana Senate Democrats. For the 2024 legislative session, Senator Ford serves on the following committees: Education and Career Development (Ranking Minority Member), Elections (Ranking Minority Member), Ethics, Family and Children Services (Ranking Minority Member), Health and Provider Services, Local Government, and Rules and Legislative Procedure

In addition to these committee assignments, Ford was an Interim Senate Minority Member of the Legislative Council.

== Electoral history ==
Indiana Senate 29th District: Results 2014–22
| Year | Democratic | Votes | % | Republican | Votes | % | Third Party | Party | Votes | % |
|---|---|---|---|---|---|---|---|---|---|---|
| 2014 | J. D. Ford | 12,685 | 46% | Mike Delph | 15,094 | 54% | | | | |
| 2018 | J. D. Ford | 31,974 | 57% | Mike Delph | 24,403 | 43% | | | | |
| 2022 | J. D. Ford | 22,636 | 52% | Alex Choi | 21,175 | 48% | | | | |

U.S. House of Representatives
| Preceded by Victoria Spartz | Member of the U.S. House of Representatives from Indiana's 5th congressional district Taking office 2027 | Elect |
