= Tyler Johnson (politician) =

American politician and physician

Member of the Indiana Senate from the 14th district
- Incumbent
- Assumed office November 22, 2022
- Preceded by: Dennis Kruse

Personal details
- Born: Grabill, Indiana, U.S.
- Party: Republican
- Education: University of Saint Francis (BS); Lake Erie College of Osteopathic Medicine (DO)
- Profession: physician, politician

Tyler Johnson is an American politician and physician serving as a member of the Indiana Senate from the 14th district. He assumed office on November 22, 2022.

== Career ==
Johnson earned a bachelor's degree from the University of Saint Francis and a doctorate in osteopathy from Lake Erie College of Osteopathic Medicine. Johnson was an independent physician and a part of the medical group called Professional Emergency Physicians.

== Personal life ==
Johnson was born in Grabill, Indiana. He and his wife, Alicia, have four children. Johnson is an active member in his church and is an elder.
