= Shelli Yoder =

American politician (born 1968)

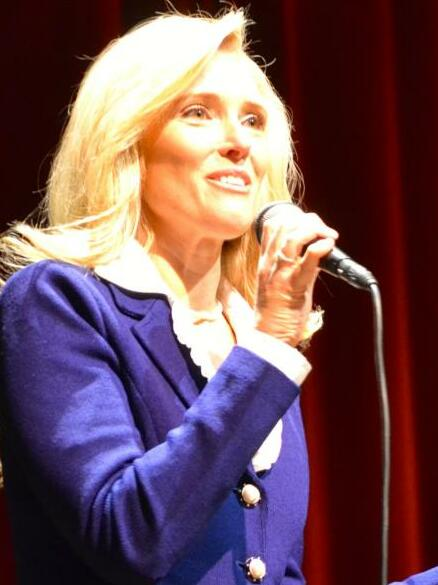

Minority Leader of the Indiana Senate
- Incumbent
- Assumed office January 13, 2025
- Preceded by: Greg Taylor

Member of the Indiana Senate from the 40th district
- Incumbent
- Assumed office November 17, 2020
- Preceded by: Mark Stoops

Personal details
- Born: Shelli Renee Yoder; August 30, 1968 (age 58) Shipshewana, Indiana, U.S.
- Party: Democratic
- Spouse: Josh Perry
- Children: 3
- Education: Indiana University-Purdue University, Fort Wayne (BA); Indiana University, South Bend (MS); Vanderbilt University (MDiv)

Shelli Renee Yoder (born August 30, 1968) is an American politician serving in the Indiana Senate for Monroe County, Indiana from Senate District 40. A former Miss Indiana and a Miss America 1993 contestant, Yoder has held positions at a number of nonprofit organizations. She was the Democratic nominee for the United States House of Representatives in Indiana's 9th congressional district in 2012 and 2016. However, she was defeated both times by Republicans: first by Todd Young and then by Trey Hollingsworth. In June 2020, she won the Democratic primary for Indiana state senate district 40. She was elected on November 3, 2020. She was sworn in on November 17, 2020.

== Biography ==
Yoder is a native of Shipshewana, Indiana. She studied interpersonal communication at Indiana University-Purdue University at Fort Wayne and has a master's degree in counseling and human services from Indiana University South Bend. In 2002 she earned a master's degree from Vanderbilt University Divinity School.

Yoder won the 1992 Miss Indiana pageant and was second runner-up in the Miss America pageant that year. While competing in pageants, she developed anorexia nervosa.

She moved to Tennessee, where she was Assistant Director of GirlForce, an advocacy group for anorexia awareness, and Executive Director of the Eating Disorders Coalition of Tennessee. She is a lecturer at the Kelley School of Business.

== 2012 U.S. House campaign ==
In February 2012, Yoder entered the race for Indiana's 9th congressional district. In a crowded primary field of five candidates, Yoder clinched the Democratic nomination with 47% of the primary vote in May.

During the primary, Yoder emphasized job creation, worker training, funding for health research, and investment in infrastructure and clean energy. She credited her success to a grassroots campaign, vowing to take on big money and special interests and be a voice for working families. Former Governor Howard Dean used his political action committee to support Yoder, calling her race a key one for Democrats in 2012. The candidates Dean's PAC supported were known as the Dean Dozen.

In the general election campaign, Yoder challenged Republican Representative Todd Young to 13 town hall debates, one in each of the district's counties, noting that Young had challenged Representative Baron Hill to numerous debates in the 2010 campaign. She criticized Young's association with Representative Todd Akin and their co-sponsoring of No Taxpayer Funding for Abortion Act, which originally included the term "forcible rape"; the word "forcible" was later removed from the bill, and Young distanced himself from Akin's remarks. Young defeated Yoder with 55% of the vote to her 45%.

== Monroe County Council ==
After her 2012 Congressional campaign, Yoder was selected to fill the remainder of Vic Kelson's term on the Monroe County Council by a special caucus of the Monroe County Democratic Party.

In 2017, Yoder helped organize the first-ever South Central Opioid Summit in Bloomington, which brought together healthcare professionals, social service workers, policy experts and police officers in order to examine ways to increase treatment for those suffering from opiate addiction.

In 2018, Yoder became the president of the Monroe County Council. And she was subsequently re-elected to the council by a margin of over 25 percentage points in the autumn. She ran on a campaign of improving mental health, drug treatment and dealing with the opioid crisis. She has also been outspoken against projects that threaten the Lake Monroe Watershed and advocates for the unique ecosystems found within south-central Indiana's state and national forests.

== 2016 Congressional campaign ==
In August 2015, Yoder announced that she would run again for the same seat in the U.S. House of Representatives. Young was not running for reelection, instead opting to run for Indiana's open U.S. Senate seat. Yoder was defeated by Republican businessman Trey Hollingsworth in the 2016 general election.

== Indiana State Senate ==
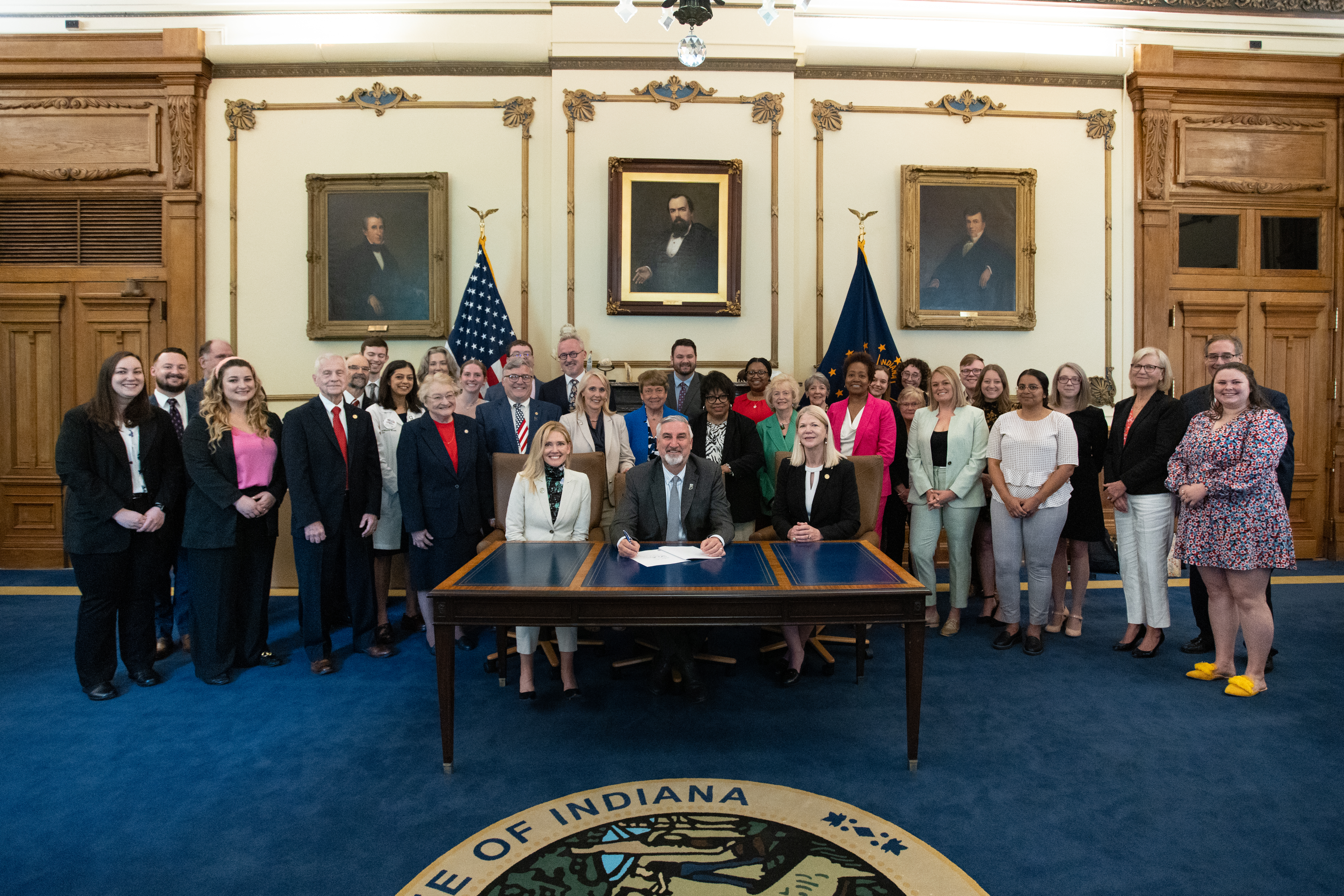
Yoder (left) at a bill signing in 2023

In June 2020, Yoder won the Democratic Primary for Indiana State Senate district 40, securing a landslide of approximately 80% of the vote. She defeated the Indiana Democratic State Party Chairman, John Zody. She was elected on November 3, 2020, and was sworn in on November 17, 2020. In November 2022, Yoder was elected by the Democratic caucus to serve as the assistant leader. Yoder was selected as Senate Minority Leader after accusations of sexual harassment came against Greg Taylor.

== Personal life ==
Yoder married Josh Perry, a professor at Indiana University Bloomington. They have three children and live in Bloomington.

In April 2019, Yoder's daughter Oakley made international headlines, when the daughter was bit by a venomous snake on a camping trip in Illinois. Oakley was flown by helicopter to a nearby hospital and treated with anti-venom drugs. But although she was in the hospital for less than 24 hours, Shelli Yoder and her husband Josh received a hospital bill for $142,938. This included a bill for $55,577 for the helicopter and the cost of $68,172 for the various venom antidotes.

In May 2020, Vanderbilt Divinity School recognized Yoder as one of their top three most distinguished alumni for the year, recognizing her for her work at the First United Church of Bloomington, in addition to her achievements in public service.

== Electoral history ==
Indiana's 9th Congressional District election, 2012
Party	Candidate	Votes	%
Republican	Todd Young	165,332	55.45
Democratic	Shelli Yoder	132,848	44.55
Total votes		298,180	100.00

Indiana's 9th congressional district, 2016
Party	Candidate	Votes	%
Republican	Trey Hollingsworth	174,791	54.1
Democratic	Shelli Yoder	130,627	40.5
Libertarian	Russell Brooksbank	17,425	5.4
Total votes		322,843	100.0
Republican hold			

Indiana State Senate District 40 Democratic primary, 2020
Party	Candidate	Votes	%
Democratic	Shelli Yoder	14,805	81.06
Democratic	John Zody	3,023	16.55
Democratic	Trent Feurbach	436	2.39
Total votes		18,265	100.00

Indiana State Senate District 40 general election, 2020
Party	Candidate	Votes	%
Democratic	Shelli Yoder	41,433	100.00%
Total votes		41,433	100.00%
Democratic hold			

Indiana State Senate District 40 general election, 2024
Party	Candidate	Votes	%
Democratic	Shelli Yoder (incumbent)	Unopposed	
Total votes			100.0
Democratic hold			

Indiana Senate
Preceded by Greg Taylor	Minority Leader of the Indiana Senate; 2025–present	Incumbent
