= Karen Tallian =

American politician

Chair of the Indiana Democratic Party
- Incumbent
- Assumed office March 15, 2025
- Preceded by: Mike Schmuhl

Member of the Indiana Senate from the 4th district
- In office December 12, 2005 – October 31, 2021
- Preceded by: Rose Ann Antich-Carr
- Succeeded by: Rodney Pol Jr.

Personal details
- Born: Karen Rae Kotansky; December 2, 1950 (age 75) Streator, Illinois, U.S.
- Party: Democratic
- Children: 3
- Education: University of Chicago (BA); Harrington College of Design (AA); Valparaiso University (JD)

Karen Rae Tallian (born December 2, 1950) is an American politician and attorney who served as a member of the Indiana Senate for the 4th district from December 2005 through October 2021. She was re-elected in 2006, 2010 and 2014. While serving in the Senate, Tallian, a progressive, has supported medicinal prescription and the decriminalization of marijuana, and has authored bills in its favor. In 2015, she announced her candidacy for governor of Indiana but dropped out that same year, well before the primary season. Tallian was also a candidate for the Democratic Party nomination for Indiana Attorney General in 2020, but lost the nomination to Jonathan Weinzapfel.

Expressing frustration with the way the Republican majority ran the Indiana legislature, Tallian retired in mid-term at the end of October, 2021.

In March, 2025 Tallian was elected Chair of the Indiana Democratic Party.

== Early life and education ==
Tallian is the daughter of Raymond D. Kotansky and Lucille (née Morlan) Kotansky. She was born in the farming community of Streator, Illinois, where her father was also born and where he traded antiques and was an auctioneer. She is the oldest of four children, including siblings Diane (née Kotansky) Patton, David Kotansky and James Kotansky.

Tallian earned her B.A. in philosophy and psychology at the University of Chicago in 1972, an associate degree from Chicago's Harrington College of Design in 1978, and a J.D. from Valparaiso University in 1990. She was admitted to the Indiana State Bar in 1990.

== Career ==
Tallian has been an attorney and partner for Eberhard & Gastineau, based in Portage, Indiana, since 1998. She was previously an associate with Hilbrich, Cunningham & Schwerd law firm after her admission to the bar. In 1993, she became an attorney for Bruce Clark and Associates. As an attorney, she has represented the Portage Township Trustees, Portage Fire Department Merit Board, Porter County Plan Commission, and Board of Zoning Appeals. She also was an adjunct instructor for Valparaiso University Law School.

=== Early political career ===
Tallian began her public service career by serving on the boards of various agencies in Porter County. She served as president and board member of the Portage Parks Foundation, president of the Porter County League of Women Voters, and director of the State Board of the League of Women Voters. As president of the Portage Parks Foundation in 2003, Tallian initiated the acquisition of Brennan Woods near the Salt Creek. Tallian first ran for town council in Ogden Dunes in 1991, but lost to the Republican candidate Trusten Lee, a dentist. She previously ran for the bench on the Porter County Superior Court in 2000, but lost to incumbent Judge Jeffrey Thode.

=== State Senator, District 4, 2005 ===
Tallian first joined the State Senate in December 2005 as a replacement for Sen. Rose Ann Antich-Carr, D-Merrillville, who stepped down after 15 years to become Clerk Treasurer of her city. Tallian represents District 4, D-Portage, which includes portions of Porter and LaPorte counties. Larry Chubb, an opponent of hers in the caucus who had previously opposed Antich-Carr in a primary, did not successfully complete the paperwork and was disqualified.

=== State Senator, District 4, 2006 ===
Incumbent Democratic candidate Tallian won her first re-election on November 7, 2006, to the Indiana State Senate District 4. She received 19,431 votes to beat her Republican opponent Dale Brewer, the Porter County Clerk, who received 11,622 votes. Tallian's first opponent Paul Childress, who won the Republican primary, dropped out in August, and Brewer was the late entrant. Brewer attacked Tallian for non-payment of her property tax. Tallian claimed it was a mistake that her mortgage payments and tax payments were not bundled, but once she noticed it, she settled her account. Another issue throughout the campaign was Tallian's opposition to the solution of Governor Mitch Daniels to lease toll roads for 75 years in order to fund his Major Moves program, which other state Democrats also opposed. Brewer supported Daniels.

Candidate	Affiliation	Support	Outcome
Karen Tallian	Democrat	19,431	Won
Dale Brewer	Republican	11,622	Lost

=== State Senator, District 4, 2010 ===
During the general election on November 2, Tallian defeated Republican Shawn Olson, receiving 3,031 more votes. She ran unopposed in the May 4 Democratic primary. During the campaign, Tallian was critical of Governor Mitch Daniels and his 2009 cut of US$450 million from primary, secondary and higher education in Indiana, and she vowed to use her position to defend education funding. After the Deepwater Horizon oil spill in the Gulf of Mexico, the public was told Tallian had accepted $500 from the BP political action committee, which she kept and said it was not a quid pro quo donation. Olson campaigned with Indiana State Senator Mike Delph (R-Carmel) at a Tea Party rally to advocate for state action against illegal immigration similar to Arizona's controversial legislation. Candidate Tallian accepted endorsements from the Indiana Manufacturers Association, the Indiana Farm Bureau's political action group and several unions.

Candidate	Affiliation	Support	Outcome
Karen Tallian	Democrat	18,888	Won
Shawn Olson	Republican	15,857	Lost

=== State Senator, District 4, 2014 ===
In 2014, Tallian ran unchallenged in the Indiana primary election on May 6, 2014, receiving 3958 votes. She went unopposed in the general election on November 4.

Candidate	Affiliation	Support	Outcome
Karen Tallian	Democrat	3958	Won
Unopposed	--	--	--

=== 2016 Indiana gubernatorial election ===
On May 12, 2015, Tallian officially announced she would seek the Democratic Party's nomination for governor in 2016. She said she decided to run for governor to restore the "balance of power" to the state government, which has been dominated by Republicans. She cited three issues that she believes illustrates how Republican control of state government has created policies more conservative than the electorate: 1) Republicans changed the composition and leadership of the State Board of Education to remove Superintendent of Public Instruction Glenda Ritz, who at the time was the only statewide elected Democrat; 2) Governor Mike Pence pushed to repeal the common construction wage that allowed state and local governments to set labor's wages for eight decades; and 3) the Republican majority passed the Religious Freedom Restoration Act (Indiana), which led to a backlash at the state and national levels.

On August 17, 2015, Tallian announced that she would drop out of the race and continue to serve as state senator. While in the running, she could not raise the amount of money or get the support from unions that she needed to mount her campaign.

== Personal life ==
She has lived in Ogden Dunes, Indiana since 1973 and was married to Robert Patrick Tallian. She attended law school while raising her three children. Tallian was divorced in 1990. Her son Mike is a Portage, Indiana firefighter and medic. Her son Chris works in Chicago and attends school. Her daughter Aimee is working in Montana for the National Park Service. Tallian suffered a heart attack in 2013.

== Committee assignments ==
- Appropriations (Ranking Minority Member)
  - School Funding Subcommittee
- Corrections & Criminal Law
  - Criminal Law Subcommittee
- Energy & Environmental Affairs
- Pensions & Labor (Ranking Minority Member, since 2010)
- Rules & Legislative Procedure

Other Indiana General Assembly affiliations

- State Budget Committee
- Pension Management Oversight Committee

National committees

- National Conference of State Legislatures Labor and Economic Development Committee
- Great Lakes Legislative Caucus
- Conference of State Governments U.S./Canada Relations Committee

Past Committees

- Insurance & Financial Institutions
- Commerce and Transportation
- Tax and Fiscal Policy 2012

== Political positions ==
=== State biennial budget, 2014–15 ===
Tallian is the ranking minority member of the Indiana Senate Appropriations Committee that sets the state's biennial budget. Her majority counterpart was Indiana State Senator Luke Kenley (R-Noblesville). This position gives Tallian a visible role in the state and in the northwest delegation. Tallian has criticized the Republican-controlled budget for holding the allotted funding for education steady over a decade, even as the population of students has grown from 1 million to 1.1 million students. The Republican majority has blocked all of her attempts to amend the budget to provide more funding for schools in poorer districts.

=== Religious Freedom Restoration Act, 2015 ===
Tallian joined nine other Democrats in the Indiana Senate and the Democrats in the House and voted against the Religious Freedom Restoration Act (Indiana SB 101), but the legislation passed on primarily Republican support and on Governor Mike Pence's signature into law. At the time, Governor Pence said, "This bill is not about discrimination." After a barrage of national criticism, threats of boycotts from around the US, and visible opposition from business leaders across Indiana, the Republicans in both chambers voted on a "fix" that would not allow LGBTQ discrimination but would also not grant them recognition under the Indiana Civil Rights Code. Tallian voted against the fix because it didn't offer enough protections for LGBTQ citizens. The Senate Democrats have been working on amending the Indiana Civil Rights Code to include LGBTQ protections.

=== Minimum wage increase, 2015 ===
Tallian led Democrats who were calling for an increase in the minimum wage from US$7.25, which is the federal minimum, to US$10.10 an hour. The latter figure is similar to the proposal in the U.S. Congress, known as Minimum Wage Fairness Act. She introduced legislation (SB 41) during the 2015 legislative session. She said, "Someone has to say that we need this. Someone has to speak for the people who otherwise have no voice. We're losing ground compared to other states on our median income." Tallian supported raising the minimum wage in Indiana as a first-term state senator in 2006, before the federal minimum wage was gradually raised from US$5.15 to US$7.25 between 2007 and 2009. In the 2015 General Assembly Session, Tallian proposed an amendment that would increase the state minimum wage to $10.10 an hour. This amendment was defeated.

=== Right to work, 2012 ===
Governor Mitch Daniels signed right to work legislation, which prohibits unions from collective bargaining based on a membership that must pay mandatory dues, into law on 1 February 2012, over the objections of both unions and Senate and House Democrats. Throughout the process and as a ranking minority member of the Pensions & Labor Committee, Tallian was a critic of the Republican proposals. She argued that the legislation would lead to lower wages and that the promised favorable atmosphere for business lacked evidence. She voted against the legislation in committee. The Republican-controlled Indiana House and Senate both passed versions of the right to work legislation. Without the necessary votes to block the Republicans in either chamber, the House Democrats temporarily halted the effort by staging a boycott and preventing the chamber from getting a quorum, beginning on January 4, 2012. This tactic ended after fines were levied against absent House legislators. The Democrats in the Senate did not have enough members to use this same tactic. Immediately after the Senate's vote on the final legislation without changes, Daniels signed the legislation into law.

=== Marijuana ===
Nuvo Newsweekly dubbed Karen Tallian "The Pot Legislator". She has backed both the decriminalization of marijuana and allowing doctors to prescribe it as a legal form of pain medication. Her case was bolstered by the support of Indiana State Senator Brent Steele (R-Bedford) but he dropped his support after states like California and Colorado adopted their own laws, because he believed the debate had changed and those states' legislation would strengthen opposition in Indiana. Tallian has continued to push for allowing doctors to prescribe it. She has allied with Indiana State Representative Linda Lawson (D-Hammond) on the issue. Tallian told Nuvo in April 2015: "Frankly, I will tell you that as long as our current governor (Mike Pence) is in office, I don't think this is ever going to happen."

Tallian has initiated the following legislation since 2011:

- 2011: SB 192 - Study of marijuana. This initial effort sought to create a study about the impact of Indiana's laws about marijuana. While the Senate's proposal passed, the similar House version of Reps. Linda Lawson and Thomas Knollman did not move out of committee, which effectively killed their effort. Tallian argued that 15,000 citizens are annually affected by the legislation, and the study advanced.
- 2012: SB 347 - Marijuana offenses. This piece of legislation sought to reduce the sentencing for marijuana-related cases. It never moved out of the committee.
- 2013: SB 580 - Marijuana. Like the legislation in the 2012 session, it sought to reduce the sentencing for marijuana-related cases. It also never moved out of the committee.
- 2014: SB 314 – Legalization of small amounts of marijuana. This was part of a three-year effort to decriminalize some possession and reduce the sentencing for other convictions. This also died in committee.
- 2015: SB 284 – Medical marijuana. This would establish a medical marijuana program and allow doctors to prescribe it for pain.

=== Major Moves program, 2006 ===
Governor Mitch Daniels initiated the program to expand and improve highway infrastructure in Indiana by providing a controversial funding mechanism. In her first term as state senator in 2006, Tallian led the opposition and critics against the Governor's funding solution to lease the state toll roads to a foreign company for a period of 75 years in exchange for US$3.85 billion paid upfront to fund the infrastructure projects. Tallian was the first to argue that the Governor's original plan gave the executive branch additional authority to privatize public transport assets, such as ports, railroads, and highways and bridges, which was then removed from the legislation and later narrowed to highways. Another charge that Tallian leveled against the Major Moves program was that it bypassed normal bidding processes in favor of direct negotiation. The Governor's plan passed on party-line vote.

== Awards ==
=== Public service ===
- 2013: one of five state legislators who were presented the Small Business Champion Award by the Indiana Chamber of Commerce
- 2011: inducted into the Society of Innovators of Northwest Indiana for offering legislation that ensures financial institutions to notify customers about their right to mediation
- 2010: Tommie Blaylock Award for Outstanding Leadership, presented by the United Steelworkers of America (USWA) Local #104
- 2008: Joan Laskowski Legislator of the Year Award, presented by the American Civil Liberties Union of Indiana

Party political offices
Preceded by Mike Schmuhl	Chair of the Indiana Democratic Party; 2025–present	Incumbent
