= Linda Rogers (politician) =

American politician

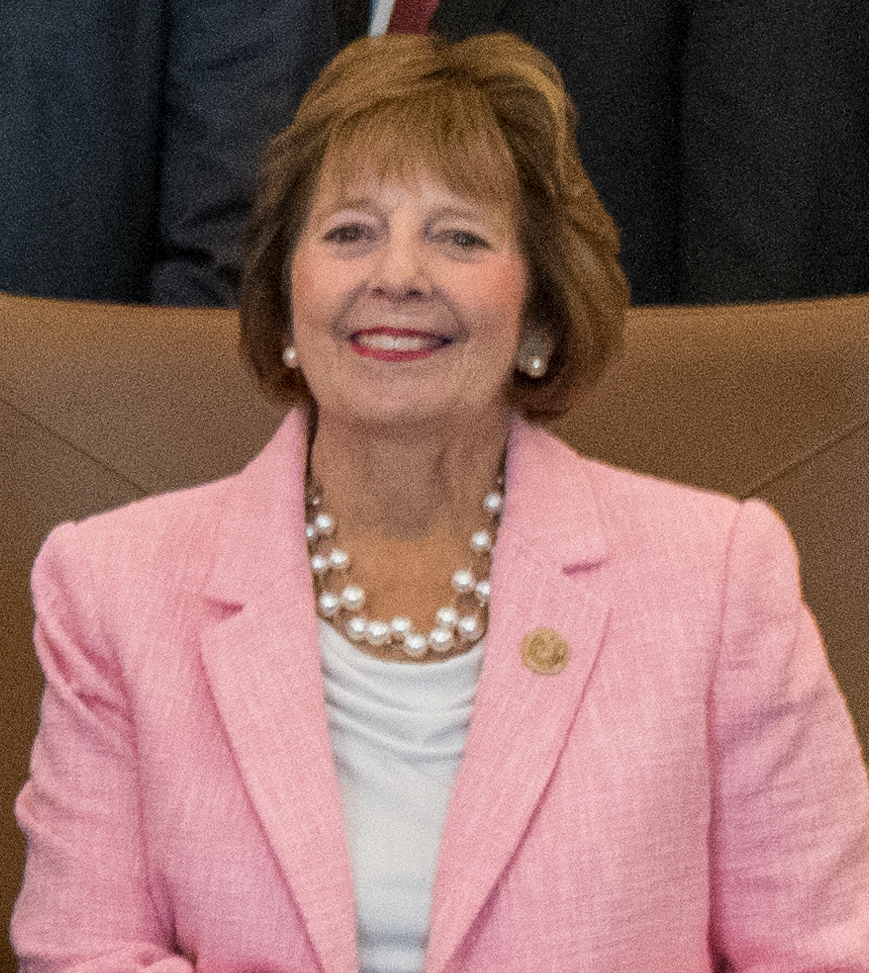

Member of the Indiana Senate from the 11th district
- In office November 7, 2018 – November 4, 2026
- Preceded by: Joe Zakas

Personal details
- Born: Bad Axe, Michigan, U.S.
- Party: Republican
- Children: 1
- Education: Central Michigan University (BS)

Linda Rogers is an American politician serving as a member of the Indiana Senate for Senate District 11. She assumed office on November 7, 2018.

In 2025, Rogers drew national attention as one of 21 Republican senators to vote against mid-decade redistricting in Indiana, which would have net Republicans an additional 2 seats in the U.S. House of Representatives, prompting criticism from national and state Republicans.

In 2026, Rogers lost renomination to Brian Schmutzler, 40.8%–59.2%

== Early life and education ==
Rogers was born in Bad Axe, Michigan. She earned a Bachelor of Science degree in mathematics education from Central Michigan University.

== Career ==
After graduating from college, Rogers worked as a teacher. She has also owned and operated several businesses, including Lindy's Restaurant, Juday Creek Estates, Nugent Builders, and the Juday Creek Golf Course. Rogers also worked as the president of the National Golf Course Owners Association and the Indiana Home Builders Association. She was elected to the Indiana Senate in 2018. In 2022, Rogers authored an amendment to House Bill 1134 that would require school learning management systems and teaching materials more accessible to parents. In 2025, she voted against a bill being pushed by Donald Trump that would redraw Indiana's congressional districts ahead of the 2026 midterm elections.
