= Phil Boots =

American politician

Member of the Indiana Senate from the 23rd district
- In office 2006–2022
- Preceded by: Joseph W. Harrison
- Succeeded by: Spencer Deery

Personal details
- Party: Republican
- Spouse: Farzaneh
- Education: Wabash College; Milligan College
- Occupation: Politician

Phillip "Phil" L. Boots is an American politician from Indiana. He was a Republican member of the Indiana Senate, representing the 23rd District between 2006 and 2022.

== Education and business career ==
Boots graduated from New Market High School and Milligan College. He owns several central Indiana businesses, and is president of Boots Bros. Oil Co., Inc., an operator of convenience stores.

== Political career ==
Before being elected to the state Senate, Boots was a Montgomery County commissioner.

In the state Senate, Boots has proposed eliminating the board of county commissioners for all of Indiana's 91 counties (in 2008), cosponsored civil forfeiture reform legislation (in 2017), was the sole member of the state Senate Public Policy Committee to vote against hate crimes bill (Senate Bill 12, in 2019) and was the sole Republican to join with the Democrats in voting against a bill to ban dilation and evacuation abortion (in 2019). In 2015, he sponsored legislation that would legalize the placement of low-stakes video gambling terminals in Indiana bars and truck stops.

Boots voted in favor of a adding a ban on same-sex marriage to the Indiana Constitution in 2011, but voted against the proposed ban in 2014.

In 2013, Boots introduced a "nullification" bill that would purport to authorizes the Indiana General Assembly to declare federal laws unconstitutional and would have declared the 2010 Affordable Care Act (ACA) to be unconstitutional and unenforceable in Indiana. The supposed doctrine of "nullification" was expressly repudiated by the U.S. Supreme Court in Cooper v. Aaron (1958), and the ACA was upheld as constitutional by the U.S. Supreme Court in a 2012 ruling.

In 2014, Boots proposed an amendment to allow employers to discriminate in hiring on the basis of religion; Boots's proposal prompted vehement objections from Democrats. Boots has sponsored legislation in 2016 to block local governments in Indiana from passing ordinances requiring employers to provide employees notice of their scheduled hours in advance, and sponsored legislation in 2017 to block local governments in Indiana from enacting "ban the box" ordinances. In 2018, Boots, as chairman of the state Senate Pensions and Labor Committee, blocked an equal pay bill (introduced by Democratic Senator Jean Breaux) from receiving a hearing by the committee.
