= Greg Taylor (politician) =

American politician

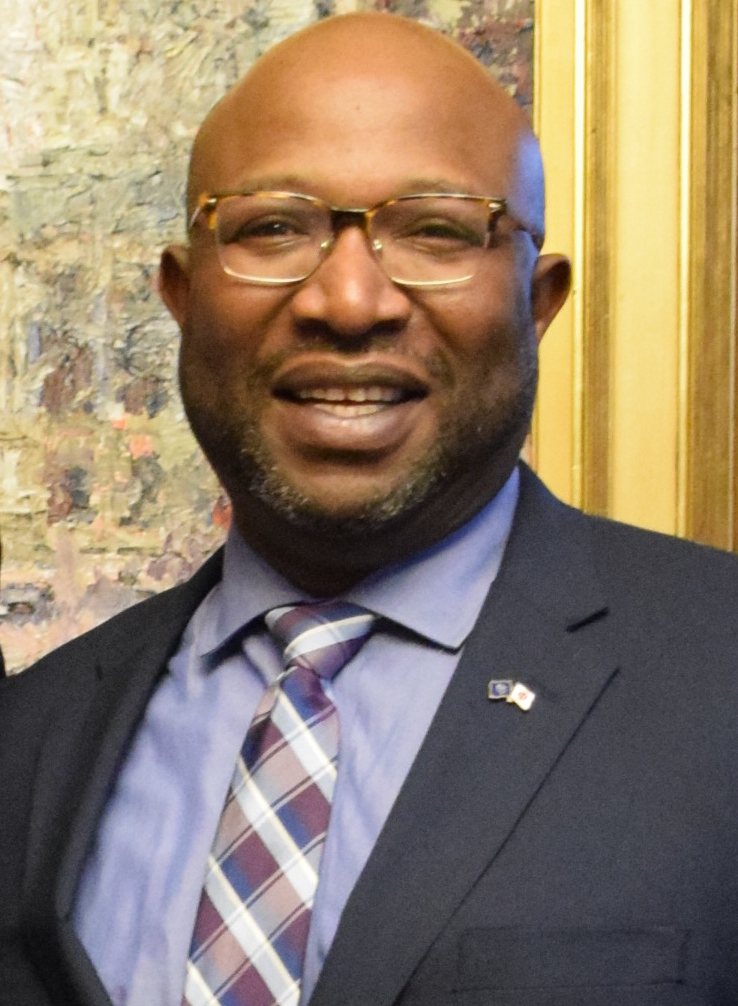

Minority Leader of the Indiana Senate
- In office November 6, 2020 – January 13, 2025
- Preceded by: Timothy Lanane
- Succeeded by: Shelli Yoder

Member of the Indiana Senate from the 33rd district
- Incumbent
- Assumed office 2008
- Preceded by: Glenn L. Howard

Personal details
- Born: 1969 or 1970 (age 55–56)
- Party: Democratic
- Education: Indiana University, Bloomington (BA, JD)

Greg Taylor (born 1969/1970) is a Democratic member of the Indiana Senate. He has represented the 33rd District since 2008. In November 2020, he was elected as the Minority Floor Leader of the Senate. He is a senior counsel at MWH Law Group, specializing in municipal finance law.

== Sexual harassment allegations ==
In November 2024, The Indianapolis Star published a story outlining three separate sexual harassment allegations spanning over eight years. A legislative assistant claimed Taylor placed his hands on her and pinned her against a door, another legislative staffer alleged verbal sexual harassment, and an intern claimed Taylor continuously pursued her looking for a personal relationship. Taylor did not deny the allegations rather apologizing and saying he "may have blurred the lines". On the same day of the allegations, Indiana Senate democrats re-elected him as Minority Leader. One month later three more women accused Taylor of sexual misconduct, including one of accusation of forcibly kissing her. One day after the second set of allegations were published Taylor was ousted as Senate Minority Leader and replaced with Shelli Yoder.

Indiana Senate
| Preceded by Timothy Lanane | Minority Leader of the Indiana Senate; 2020–2025 | Succeeded by Shelli Yoder |
