= Rodney Pol Jr. =

American politician

Rodney Pol
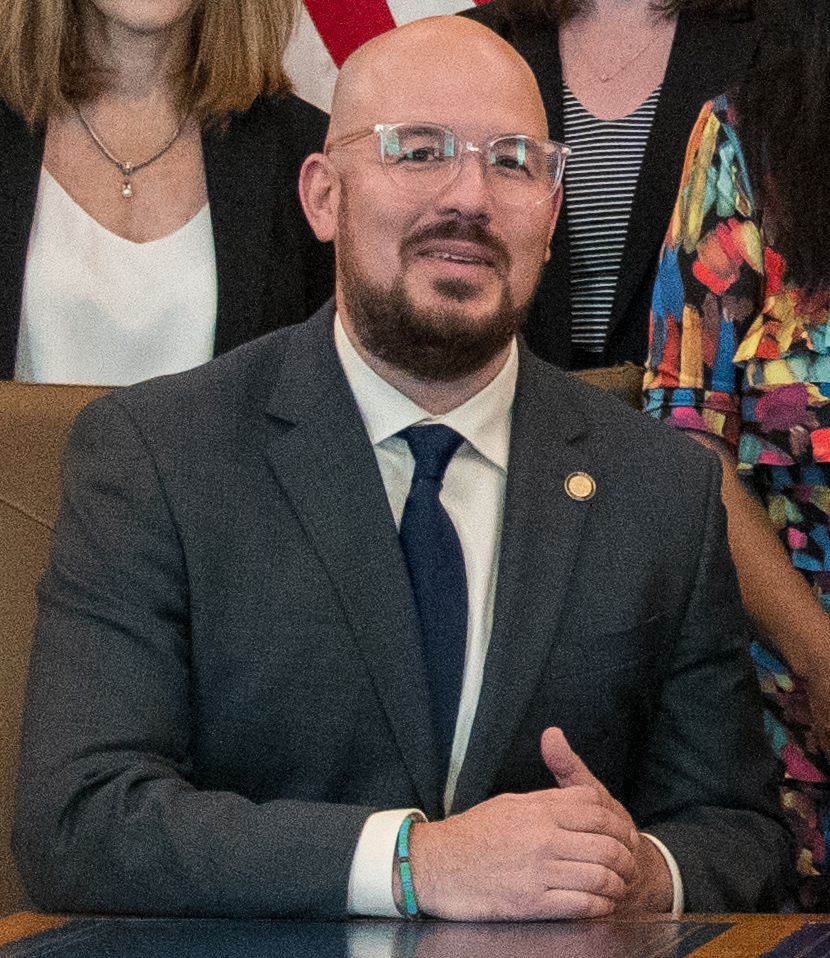

Member of the Indiana Senate from the 4th district
- Incumbent
- Assumed office November 1, 2021
- Preceded by: Karen Tallian

Personal details
- Born: East Chicago, Indiana, U.S.
- Party: Democratic
- Education: Indiana University, Bloomington (BA); Indiana University, Indianapolis (JD)

Rodney Pol Jr. is an American attorney and politician serving as a member of the Indiana Senate from the 4th district. He assumed office on November 1, 2021.

== Early life and education ==
Pol was born in East Chicago, Indiana, and graduated from Chesterton High School. He earned a Bachelor of Arts degree in psychology, political science, and music from Indiana University Bloomington and a Juris Doctor from the Indiana University Robert H. McKinney School of Law.

== Career ==
In 2005 and 2006, Pol served as a legislative aide in the Indiana House of Representatives. As a college student, Pol worked as a flooring installer. Pol worked as a law clerk for the Lake County Circuit Court and Indiana Department of Education. Pol worked as the city attorney of Gary, Indiana from 2014 to 2021 and as a public defender in the Indiana State Public Defender's Office from 2010 to 2014. He was appointed to the Indiana Senate in November 2021, succeeding Karen Tallian.

In 2025, he voted with Indiana's Republican super majority to ban trans youth from sport and implement invasive sex-testing.
