= Mike Delph =

American politician (born 1970)

Member of the Indiana Senate from the 29th district
- In office December 8, 2005 – November 7, 2018
- Preceded by: J. Murray Clark
- Succeeded by: J. D. Ford

Personal details
- Born: January 12, 1970 (age 56) Weymouth, Massachusetts, U.S.
- Party: Republican
- Spouse: Beth Frankel
- Children: 5
- Education: Indiana University, Bloomington (BA, MS, MPA); Indiana University, Indianapolis (JD)
- Website: Official website

Military service
- Allegiance: United States
- Branch/service: United States Army
- Years of service: 2001–present
- Rank: Major
- Unit: United States Army Reserve
- Mike Delph's voice recorded March 2014

Michael A. Delph (born January 12, 1970) is a former Republican member of the Indiana State Senate representing the 29th district from 2005 to 2018. He is considered to be a "socially conservative Republican," who has courted support from the Tea Party movement.

Delph is known for his immigration legislation and his support for an Indiana Constitutional amendment that would ban same-sex marriages and civil unions. He is frequently mentioned and has shown interest in representing Indiana in statewide office or in US Congress. On November 6, 2018, Delph lost reelection in the State Senate to J. D. Ford.

== Personal details ==
Mike Delph is the son of David W. Delph, who was an Indianapolis-based executive for Iowa Beef Processors, and Sharon Delph, who worked at a bank, and he has three brothers, Jamie, Stephen and John. His parents were divorced. Delph attended Carmel High School and was a member of the class of 1988. Delph was educated at Indiana University and holds four degrees from the institution. He received his bachelor's degree in 1992, master's degree in environmental science and Masters of Public Affairs in 1996, and his Juris Doctor (J.D.) degree from Indiana University School of Law in 2010.

In 2011, Delph passed the Indiana State Bar exam. He is a fluent speaker of Spanish. He married Beth (née Frankel) in 1993 and they have five daughters, who are home schooled.

Delph and his family are members of the non-denominational Central Christian Church in Carmel, Indiana.

After working as a congressional staffer, Delph represented Comcast Cable as regional director of government affairs. In 2012, Delph joined CarDon & Associates as general counsel.

Delph is a major in the United States Army Reserve. He has served since 2001.

== Political career ==
=== Congressional staffer ===
From 1996 to 2004, Delph worked as a Congressional staffer for US Representative Dan Burton, a Republican who at the time represented Indiana's 6th congressional district, although Burton would end his career in Indiana's 5th congressional district.

Delph has served as Burton's district director and chief of staff. During this time, Delph was a Republican precinct committee leader.

=== Republican nomination for Indiana Secretary of State ===
Delph competed and lost the Republican nomination for Secretary of State of Indiana in 2002. He was running against then Marion County Coroner Dr. John McGoff, Vanderburgh County Commissioner Richard Mourdock and Deputy Secretary of State Todd Rokita.

NBA basketball player Kent Benson briefly competed but dropped out in March and well before the June Republican convention in Indianapolis. Representative Burton introduced Delph before the Republican state convention delegates.

Richard Mourdock's campaign made a controversial move when it issued a vote appeal handout to delegates inferring Delph had withdrawn when Delph was still in competition for the nomination. The flier read:

Delph Supporters Urged to Vote Mourdock: Conservatives must unite on the second ballot to guarantee strong candidate support in November. The Mourdock campaign congratulates Mike Delph on a hard-fought campaign and invites Delph supporters to join with Mourdock supporters to nominate a conservative on the second ballot!

Even though Mourdock had the most votes on the initial ballot, Rokita won the nomination and later the general election in November against then-Democratic opponent Bloomington Mayor John Fernandez.

=== State Senator, District 29, 2005 ===
In December 2005, Delph replaced retiring State Senator J. Murray Clark, who retired with one year remaining in his term. Delph won the Republican Caucus vote, a special election, against his competitor Dan Gammon, who was at the time a Wayne Township trustee.

The state senator of District 29 represents a section of Marion and Hamilton counties. Boone County was added later in 2011. His top supporters were Bill Schneider, a former Indianapolis City-County Council member; Paul Shoopman, a real estate businessman; and his employer US Representative Burton.

=== First full term S-29 2006 ===
During his first general election in 2006, Delph won unopposed. The Democrats had nominated Mennonite minister Jennifer "Jeni" Umble but her filing was not validated because the submission occurred past deadline.

Indiana State Senate, District 29, Election Results, November 7, 2006

Candidate	Affiliation	Support	Outcome
Mike Delph	Republican	21,138	Won
Unopposed	--	--	--

=== Second full term S-29 2010 ===
In 2010, Mike Delph ran for re-election and won in a race where he faced Democrat Robin Shackleford. She ran against Delph's immigration legislation modeled after Arizona state's. After the 2010 election, the Indiana Republicans held a supermajority in the House and Senate, 37 Republican senators and 13 Democratic senators.

Indiana State Senate, District 29, Election Results, November 2, 2010

Candidate	Party	Support	Outcome
Mike Delph	Republican	22,498	59%
Robin Shackleford	Democrat	15,532	41%

=== Third Full Term S-29 2014 ===
In November 2014, Delph successfully stood for reelection against Democrat J.D. Ford. Initially, both candidates ran unopposed in their respective May primaries. J.D. Ford was a gay candidate who opposed Delph's stand on same-sex marriage. Delph's Twitter communication about an internal debate within the Republican caucus about recognition of same-sex unions in Indiana, which was the proposal for a state constitutional amendment passed in altered form during the 2014, provided publicity about his reelection with Ford.

During the campaign, Ford made a statement that some felt called for discrimination against individuals with religious beliefs, while responding to a question regarding discrimination against LGBT individuals.

Indiana State Senate, District 29, Election Results, November 4, 2014

Candidate	Party	Support	Outcome
Mike Delph	Republican	15,094	54%
J.D. Ford	Democrat	12,685	46%

=== Defeated for re-election S-29 2018 ===
Delph again faced Ford when he sought reelection for the fourth time in 2018. After winning the Republican primary, he was defeated in the general election, the only Republican State Senate casualty of the night.

Indiana State Senate, District 29, Election Results, November 6, 2018

Candidate	Party	Support	Outcome
J.D. Ford	Democrat	31,974	57%
Mike Delph	Republican	24,403	43%

=== Potential Federal Races Since 2012 ===
For the 2012 election, Delph was not standing in an election but he was mentioned as a Tea Party alternative to long-time Republican Indiana Senator Richard Lugar. However, he did not enter the race.

In 2012, US Representative Dan Burton announced he would retire, which opened up his congressional seat. While Delph had worked for Burton previously and Burton was a political ally, Delph did not run for the seat.

During the 2012 Presidential primary season, Delph supported Senator Rick Santorum of Pennsylvania for the Republican Party nomination.

While Delph was mentioned as a potential US Senate candidate in 2014 and 2016, he did not run in either race.

Delph was again mentioned as a potential congressional candidate in the 2024 race for the open District 5 seat.

== Committee assignments ==
- Tax and fiscal policy
- Judiciary
  - Courts and juvenile justice subcommittee
- Insurance/financial institutions

== Political positions ==
=== Government reorganization ===
Before Delph's appointment to finish J. Murray Clark's final term, Senator David Long, a Republican from Fort Wayne, proposed Senate Bill 225 that addressed the merging of Allen County's governmental units, but Long took his bill out of consideration after facing opposition from a crowd of 400 people at a February 2004 public meeting in Grabill, which became known as the "Grabill Massacre."

During the 2006 session of the Indiana Legislature, then House Representative Jim Buck, a Republican from Kokomo, and Delph authored and sponsored House Enrolled Act 1362 that would allow mergers of Indiana's governmental units without the legislature's approval. After Long successfully amended the voting process for a merger between city and county, the bill went on to pass both chambers, and its final passage occurred just one minute before its deadline. The Government Modernization Act of 2006 signed by Governor Mitch Daniels led to the consolidation of the city of Zionsville with Eagle and Union townships of Boone County in January 2010, an area which is part of Delph's current district.

=== Abortion ===
While Delph was heading toward his first general election in 2006, he threw his support behind a controversial Senate Bill (Indiana SB-90) that would make it law to strengthen informed consent requiring information presented to women before abortions that 1) life begins at conception and 2) education about the pain felt by the unborn child. Planned Parenthood and other opponents rejected it on the grounds that the communication was religious indoctrination, the science was inconclusive, and the legislation amounted to interference in the doctor and patient relationship.

Different versions passed the Indiana Senate and House and so the bills had to be reconciled in committee.

In the end, the bill was unsuccessful by procedure because the necessary votes did not take place on time. Based upon the State Senate President Pro Tem Robert Garton's power to schedule votes, he lost the support of Right to Life groups and those groups threw their support behind his Republican primary challenger Greg Walker. This resulted in Garton's defeat in the May Indiana primary. Delph supported Senator Brent Steele, a Republican from Bedford and a strong opponent of abortion, during his bid to replace Garton for Senate leader in 2006, but Senator David Long won.

Later, Delph was critical of a judge's decision in June 2012 on the state's law concerning the federal funding of abortion services. A US District Court judge ruled in favor of Planned Parenthood. The organization argued that state legislation to block its access to Medicaid funding for all of its services based upon its support of abortions created a conflict between state and federal powers. Delph said the courts were interfering with state executive and legislative powers. The judge's decision was upheld in October by 7th U.S. Circuit Court of Appeals.

=== Immigration ===
While competing for Republican nomination for Indiana Secretary of State in 2002, Delph was considered by political observers to be seeking support from Latinos.

Delph was an author and advocate for 2011 state immigration legislation, known as Indiana SB-590, that was modeled after Arizona's controversial 2010 immigration law. SB-590 passed in the State Senate. The Indiana House removed several controversial parts from the original Senate version. Delph then negotiated the compromise between the House and Senate.

After Governor Mitch Daniels signed it into law, a US District Court judge blocked two sections of the law. Other states, such as Alabama, Georgia, South Carolina and Utah also passed similar legislation, and like Arizona's those laws were challenged in court. Attorney General Greg Zoeller gave up on three warrantless arrest provisions of the law after the Supreme Court decided the Arizona v. United States case in July 2012.

Judge Sarah Evans Barker of the United States District Court for the Southern District of Indiana heard the case and eliminated portions of it. Zoeller did not appeal the decision.

=== Same-sex marriage amendment ===
In 2011, the Indiana legislature passed the Marriage Amendment to make Indiana's current statute on the definition of marriage as between a man and woman part of the Indiana Constitution.

According to Indiana's constitutional amendment process, two consecutive elected legislatures must pass the same amendment before it is sent to voters. When Republicans raised the issue with HJR-3 in 2014, Delph became a prominent spokesperson for passage in the media pushing for statewide vote.

Delph told WRTV that according to his survey 60 percent of his constituents wanted to vote on the amendment in November. The amendment did not pass during session because of a controversial second sentence that would have also banned on civil unions. During the process, the second sentence was removed by each chamber. Delph was critical of traditional supporters of the amendment, especially Senate leader David Long and House Speaker Brian Bosma, who did not exert their political influence during the most favorable political climate for its passage.

Delph criticized Long for moving the hearing for the amendment from the Judiciary Committee, led by social conservative Senator Brent Steele, to the Rules and Legislative Procedures Committee, headed by Long, and the change to the second sentence was made in the less favorable committee. Delph and some others then voted against the senate version as the second sentence, in their view, better protected a passed amendment from a later judiciary challenge.

== Controversies or media attention ==
=== Mother ===
While it had already been reported in 1990 that Delph's mother Sharon Delph was in the employ of Dan Burton's federal reelection campaign and had at that time received US$1500, she was mentioned again during a time period when Dan Burton was one of Bill Clinton's most vocal critics during Clinton's impeachment process.

In 1998, while Delph worked on Congressman Dan Burton's staff, Salon reported that Delph's mother was a possible "ghost employee" of Burton's federal political campaigns although her ex-husband and the state senator's father was unaware of her campaign work. Sharon Delph had known Dan Burton since the 1960s. Burton had served as a reference for Delph and he employed him out of college. The Washington Post also named Claudia Keller as another salary recipient who was a possible "ghost employee" and reported that her family members were also paid by Burton. In addition, Burton revealed in 1998 that he was the father of a child by a woman who was not his wife and that the boy was then fifteen years old.

Although the Congressional Accountability Project filed a letter of complaint against Burton, which also made mention of Sharon Delph, the ethics investigation in the media was never pursued by the Congressional Ethics Committee.

=== Military uniform ===
In 2008, Delph was investigated by the US military when a fellow reserve officer from his unit wore a military uniform and appeared alongside Delph at Delph's press conference. The officer was speaking in favor of Delph's immigration legislation. Both officers were with the same 310th Expeditionary Sustainment Command. At the time, Delph was a captain and a company commander with the 310th. The other officer was a lieutenant colonel with the same unit. Members of the military are prohibited from wearing uniforms at political events and appearing to side with any political group. Delph was the one who suggested the officer wear his uniform to the press conference.

=== Tim Durham ===
In 2011, Delph announced he would return US$10,000 in campaign funds from 2006 and 2007 donated by Tim Durham. The Indianapolis-based businessman would later be convicted and sentenced to 50 years for his role in a Ponzi scheme. Durham had supported Indiana Republicans, including then Governor Mitch Daniels' acceptance of just under US$200,000.

=== Brother ===
During a public debate over Twitter about his support for an amendment that would ban same-sex marriage by constitution in 2014, Delph said his brother Stephen is a homosexual. His brother conducted interviews and said he disagreed with his brother on the amendment but said all his brothers had always been supportive. Stephen said Mike even suggested he date an old college friend; Senator Delph said he was not a matchmaker but encouraged his brother to seek out positive friends.

=== Discipline sanction by State Senate leader ===
In 2014, Delph made what was called in Indiana "the tweet heard around the world" about the defeat of HJR-3 in a form social conservatives wanted to move to voters in the fall.

During the 2014 session, Delph was sanctioned by State Senate President Pro Tem David Long for "bluntly speaking his mind" about what he perceived as Long's and other party leaders' mishandling of the same-sex marriage amendment. Delph also said in a press conference that he tweeted information from the Senate floor based on his own vote count. As a result of Long's punishment, Delph lost his status as a ranking member of the State Senate Judiciary Committee, was stripped of his communication position within the majority and of his press secretary, and was moved in the chamber to sit with the minority Democrats.

His press conferences and tweets promoted his name recognition throughout the state as a leader for the amendment's passage. He told journalists after he had "no regrets" and had "strong beliefs" about the issue.

== Awards and honors ==
=== Military service ===
- Army Commendation Medal
- Joint Service Achievement Medal

=== Public service ===
- 2013 & 2006, Distinguished Public Service Award, awarded by the American Legion
- 2010, Mr. Clean Award, awarded by Common Cause
- 2006, Legislator of the Year, awarded by Disabled American Veterans
- 2005 Sagamore of the Wabash Award

== See also ==
- List of politicians affiliated with the Tea Party movement

Indiana Senate
Preceded by J. Murray Clark	Member of the Indiana Senate from the 29th district 2005–2018	Succeeded by J. D. Ford
