= Mike Gaskill =

American politician

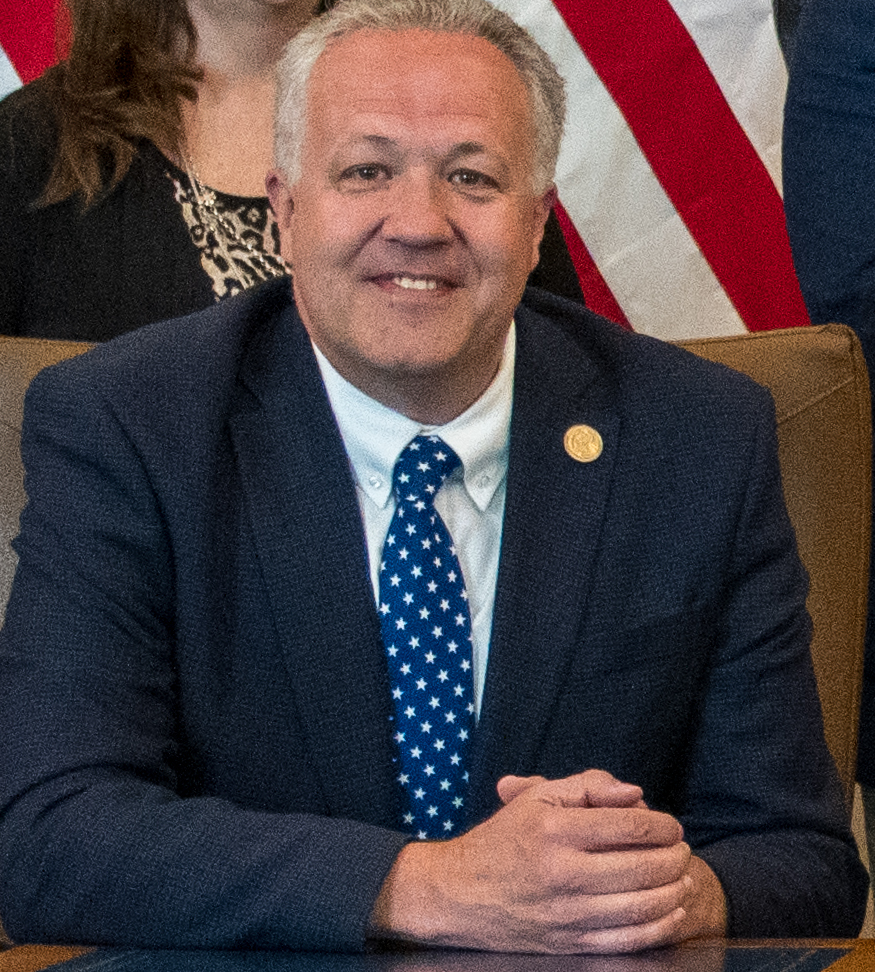

Member of the Indiana Senate from the 25th district
- Incumbent
- Assumed office November 9, 2022
- Preceded by: Timothy Lanane

Member of the Indiana Senate from the 26th district
- In office November 7, 2018 – November 9, 2022
- Preceded by: Doug Eckerty
- Succeeded by: Scott Alexander

Personal details
- Party: Republican
- Spouse: Kelly
- Children: 3
- Education: Anderson University (BS)

Mike Gaskill is an American politician serving as a member of the Indiana Senate from the 25th district.

== Education ==
Gaskill graduated from Pendleton Heights High School and earned a Bachelor of Science degree in accounting and computer science from Anderson University.

== Career ==
Gaskill worked as a business systems manager for Praxair Surface Technologies before founding an insurance business. He was elected to the Indiana Senate in November 2018. He also serves as the ranking member of the Senate Insurance and Financial Institutions Committee.

In 2025, Gaskill was the Senate sponsor of a bill that would redraw Indiana's congressional maps ahead of the 2026 midterm elections. The bill failed, with 19 senators voting in support and 31 against.
