= Timothy Lanane =

American politician

Tim Lanane

Minority Leader of the Indiana Senate
- In office November 5, 2008 – November 6, 2020
- Preceded by: Richard D. Young
- Succeeded by: Greg Taylor

Member of the Indiana Senate from the 25th district
- Incumbent
- Assumed office July 19, 1997
- Preceded by: William McCarty
- Succeeded by: Mike Gaskill

Personal details
- Born: July 24, 1952 (age 74) Anderson, Indiana, U.S.
- Party: Democratic
- Spouse: Cynthia
- Education: Ball State University (BS); Indiana University Bloomington (JD)

Timothy S. "Tim" Lanane (born July 24, 1952) is a former member of the Indiana Senate for the Democratic Party, who represented the 25th District since 1997, succeeding William McCarthy. Following the retirement of Senator Vi Simpson, Lanane became Minority Leader in 2013. District 25 included the cities of Muncie and Anderson as well as Union Township and part of Anderson Township in Madison County and Salem, Center, Monroe, Liberty and Perry townships in Delaware County.

Indiana Senate
Preceded by Richard D. Young	Minority Leader of the Indiana Senate; 2008–2020	Succeeded by Greg Taylor
