= 2022 United States House of Representatives elections in Indiana =

- November 8, 2022

All 9 Indiana seats to the United States House of Representatives
| | Majority party | Minority party |
|---|---|---|
| Party | Republican | Democratic |
| Last election | 7 | 2 |
| Seats won | 7 | 2 |
| Seat change | Steady | Steady |
| Popular vote | 1,108,351 | 716,348 |
| Percentage | 59.70% | 38.58% |
| Swing | ▲1.67% | ▼1.30% |

Republican
50–60%
60–70%
70–80%
80–90%
Democratic
50–60%
60–70%

The 2022 United States House of Representatives elections in Indiana were held on November 8, 2022, to elect the nine U.S. representatives from the state of Indiana, one from each of the state's nine congressional districts. The elections coincided with other elections to the U.S. House of Representatives, elections to the U.S. Senate, and various state and local elections. Primary elections took place on May 3.

== District 1 ==
2022 Indiana's 1st congressional district election
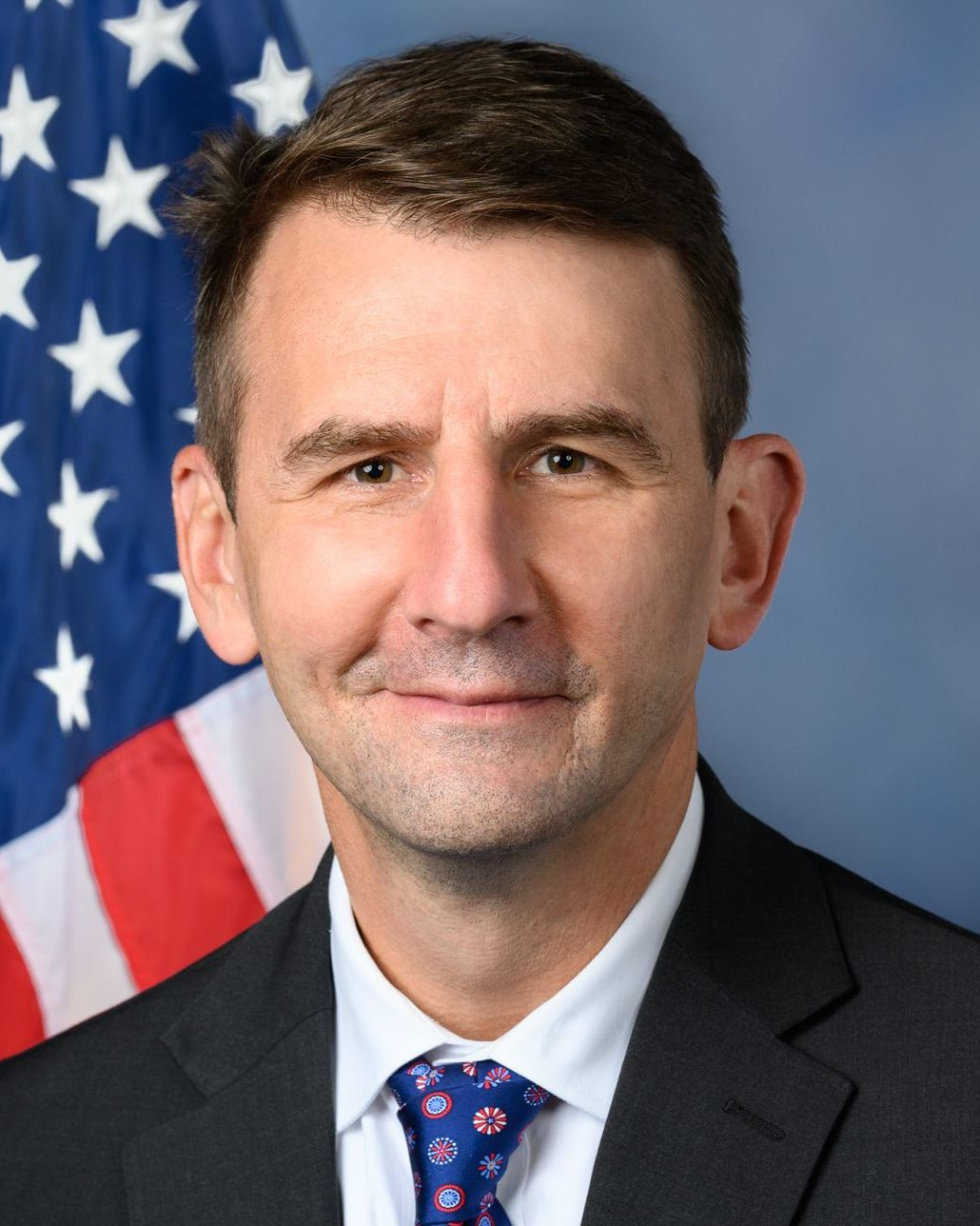

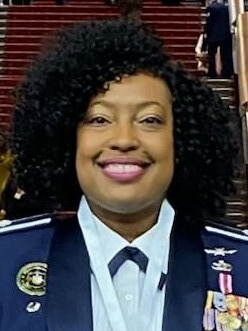
| Nominee | Frank J. Mrvan | Jennifer-Ruth Green |
| Party | Democratic | Republican |
| Popular vote | 112,656 | 100,542 |
| Percentage | 52.8% | 47.2% |
- Mrvan: 40–50% 50–60% 60–70% 70–80% 80–90% >90% Green: 50–60% 60–70% 70–80% 80–90% >90% Tie: 40–50% 50% No votes
U.S. Representative before election
Frank J. Mrvan
Democratic
Elected U.S. Representative
Frank J. Mrvan
Democratic

The 1st district encompasses Northwest Indiana, taking in the eastern Chicago metropolitan area, including Hammond and Gary, as well as Lake County, Porter County and western LaPorte County. The incumbent was Democrat Frank J. Mrvan, who was elected with 56.6% of the vote in 2020.

During the campaign, a research firm contracted by the Democratic Congressional Campaign Committee inappropriately obtained the military records of candidate and air force veteran Jennifer-Ruth Green. This included her experience of having been sexually assaulted by an Iraqi serviceman. Green stated she was "saddened to have to share publicly one of the most private events of my life".

=== Democratic primary ===
==== Candidates ====
===== Nominee =====
- Frank J. Mrvan, incumbent U.S. representative

===== Eliminated in primary =====
- Richard Fantin

==== Endorsements ====
Frank Mrvan

Organizations

- Planned Parenthood Action Fund

Labor unions

- IUOE Local 150 (co-endorsed with Milo)

==== Results ====
Democratic primary results
| Party | Candidate | Votes | % |
|---|---|---|---|
| Democratic | Frank J. Mrvan (incumbent) | 34,489 | 86.4 |
| Democratic | Richard Fantin | 5,413 | 13.6 |
| Total votes | | 39,902 | 100.0 |

=== Republican primary ===
==== Candidates ====
===== Nominee =====
- Jennifer-Ruth Green, Air Force veteran and educator

===== Eliminated in primary =====
- Mark Leyva, former steel mill worker and perennial candidate
- Martin Lucas, attorney
- Blair Milo, former mayor of La Porte
- Nicholas Pappas, attorney
- Ben Ruiz
- Aaron Storer

==== Endorsements ====
Jennifer-Ruth Green

Statewide officials

- Todd Rokita, Indiana Attorney General (2021–present)

Organizations

- Maggie's List
- Huck PAC
- Indiana Right To Life PAC
- SEAL PAC
- Susan B. Anthony List
Blair Milo

Local officials

- Jon Costas, former mayor of Valparaiso (2004–2020)
- Tom Dermody, mayor of La Porte (2019–present)

Labor unions

- IUOE Local 150 (co-endorsed with Mrvan)

==== Results ====
Republican primary results
| Party | Candidate | Votes | % |
|---|---|---|---|
| Republican | Jennifer-Ruth Green | 14,616 | 47.1 |
| Republican | Blair Milo | 6,964 | 22.4 |
| Republican | Mark Leyva | 4,173 | 13.5 |
| Republican | Nicholas Pappas | 2,409 | 7.8 |
| Republican | Martin Lucas | 1,114 | 3.6 |
| Republican | Ben Ruiz | 1,054 | 3.4 |
| Republican | Aaron Storer | 692 | 2.2 |
| Total votes | | 31,022 | 100.0 |

=== General election ===
==== Predictions ====
| Source | Ranking | As of |
|---|---|---|
| The Cook Political Report | Tossup | July 19, 2022 |
| Inside Elections | Lean D | August 25, 2022 |
| Sabato's Crystal Ball | Lean D | November 7, 2022 |
| Politico | Lean D | May 6, 2022 |
| RCP | Tossup | June 9, 2022 |
| Fox News | Tossup | July 11, 2022 |
| DDHQ | Likely D | July 20, 2022 |
| FiveThirtyEight | Likely D | September 29, 2022 |
| The Economist | Lean D | September 28, 2022 |

==== Post-primary endorsements ====
Frank Mrvan (D)

Organizations

- American Israel Public Affairs Committee

Labor unions

- Indiana AFL–CIO
Jennifer-Ruth Green (R)

Federal officials

- Nikki Haley, 29th United States Ambassador to the United Nations (2017–2018)
- Mike Pence, 48th vice president of the United States (2017-2021)
- Mike Pompeo, 70th United States Secretary of State (2018–2021)

U.S. senators

- Tom Cotton, United States senator from Arkansas
- Todd Young, U.S. senator From Indiana

U.S. representatives

- Jim Banks, U.S. representative from Indiana's 3rd congressional district
- Larry Bucshon, U.S. representative from Indiana's 8th congressional district
- Kat Cammack, U.S. representative from Florida's 3rd congressional district
- Elise Stefanik, U.S. representative from New York's 21st congressional district

Organizations

- Elevate PAC
- National Federation of Independent Business - Indiana chapter
- National Right to Life Committee
- Tea Party Express

==== Polling ====
| Poll source | Date(s) administered | Sample size (Note: Key: A – all adults RV – registered voters LV – likely voters V – unclear) | Margin of error | Frank Mrvan (D) | Jennifer-Ruth Green (R) | Undecided |
|---|---|---|---|---|---|---|
| RMG Research | May 19–20, 2022 | 500 (LV) | ± 4.5% | 47% | 40% | 12% |

==== Results ====
2022 Indiana's 1st congressional district election
| Party | Candidate | Votes | % |
|---|---|---|---|
| Democratic | Frank J. Mrvan (incumbent) | 112,656 | 52.8 |
| Republican | Jennifer-Ruth Green | 100,542 | 47.2 |
| Write-in | | 9 | 0.0 |
| Total votes | | 213,207 | 100.0 |
| Democratic hold | | | |

== District 2 ==
2022 Indiana's 2nd congressional district election
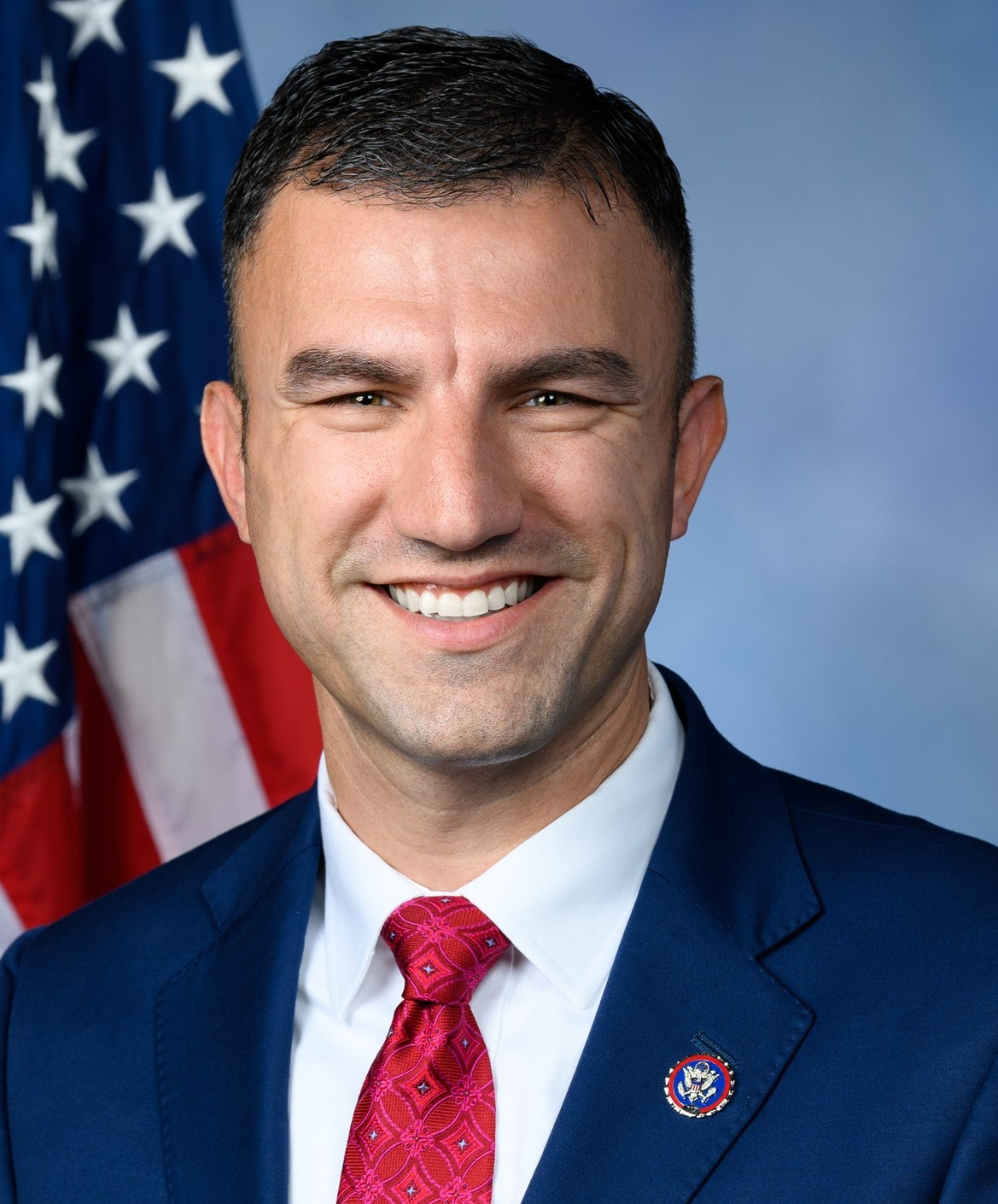

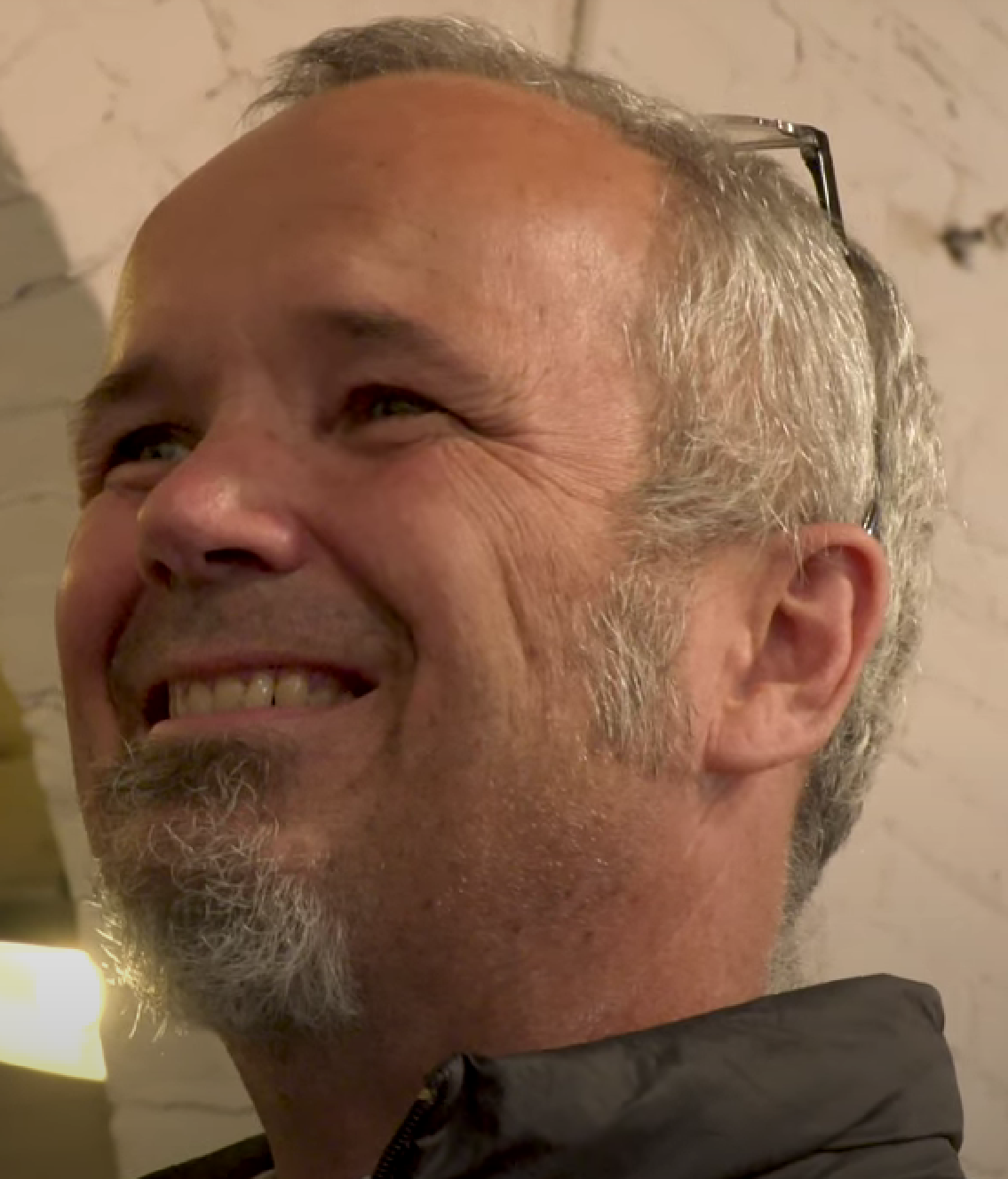
| Nominee | Rudy Yakym (replacing Jackie Walorski) | Paul Steury |
| Party | Republican | Democratic |
| Popular vote | 125,313 | 62,891 |
| Percentage | 64.6% | 32.4% |
- County results Yakym: 50–60% 60–70% 70–80%
U.S. Representative before election
Rudy Yakym
Republican
Elected U.S. Representative
Rudy Yakym
Republican

The 2nd district is located in north central Indiana, taking in Michiana, including South Bend, Mishawaka, and Elkhart. The incumbent was Republican Jackie Walorski, who was re-elected with 61.5% of the vote in 2020. Walorski died in a car crash on August 3, 2022, alongside three others, among them staff members Emma Thomson and Zach Potts. In accordance with Indiana law, a special election was set to be held in order to fill the vacancy. This election was under the new district lines as the congressional district boundaries set in the 2020 redistricting cycle went into effect on January 3, 2023, while the special election was conducted under the old district lines.

=== Republican primary ===
==== Candidates ====
===== Former nominee =====
- Jackie Walorski, incumbent U.S. representative (died August 3, 2022)

==== Endorsements ====
Jackie Walorski (deceased)

U.S. executive branch officials

- Donald Trump, 45th president of the United States (2017–2021)

Organizations

- Huck PAC
- Maggie's List

==== Results ====
Republican primary results
| Party | Candidate | Votes | % |
|---|---|---|---|
| Republican | Jackie Walorski (incumbent) | 36,928 | 100.0 |
| Total votes | | 36,928 | 100.0 |

=== Democratic primary ===
==== Candidates ====
===== Nominee =====
- Paul Steury, environmental consultant

==== Endorsements ====
Paul Steury

Organizations

- Sierra Club

Labor unions

- Indiana AFL–CIO
- IUOE Local 150

==== Results ====
Democratic primary results
| Party | Candidate | Votes | % |
|---|---|---|---|
| Democratic | Paul Steury | 11,708 | 100.0 |
| Total votes | | 11,708 | 100.0 |

=== General election ===
==== Predictions ====
| Source | Ranking | As of |
|---|---|---|
| The Cook Political Report | Solid R | October 5, 2021 |
| Inside Elections | Solid R | October 13, 2021 |
| Sabato's Crystal Ball | Safe R | October 5, 2021 |
| Politico | Solid R | April 5, 2022 |
| RCP | Safe R | June 9, 2022 |
| Fox News | Solid R | July 11, 2022 |
| DDHQ | Solid R | July 20, 2022 |
| FiveThirtyEight | Solid R | July 6, 2022 |
| The Economist | Safe R | September 28, 2022 |

==== Results ====
2022 Indiana's 2nd congressional district election
| Party | Candidate | Votes | % |
|---|---|---|---|
| Republican | Rudy Yakym | 125,313 | 64.6 |
| Democratic | Paul Steury | 62,891 | 32.4 |
| Libertarian | William Henry | 5,858 | 3.0 |
| Write-in | | 11 | 0.0 |
| Total votes | | 194,073 | 100.0 |
| Republican hold | | | |

== District 3 ==
2022 Indiana's 3rd congressional district election
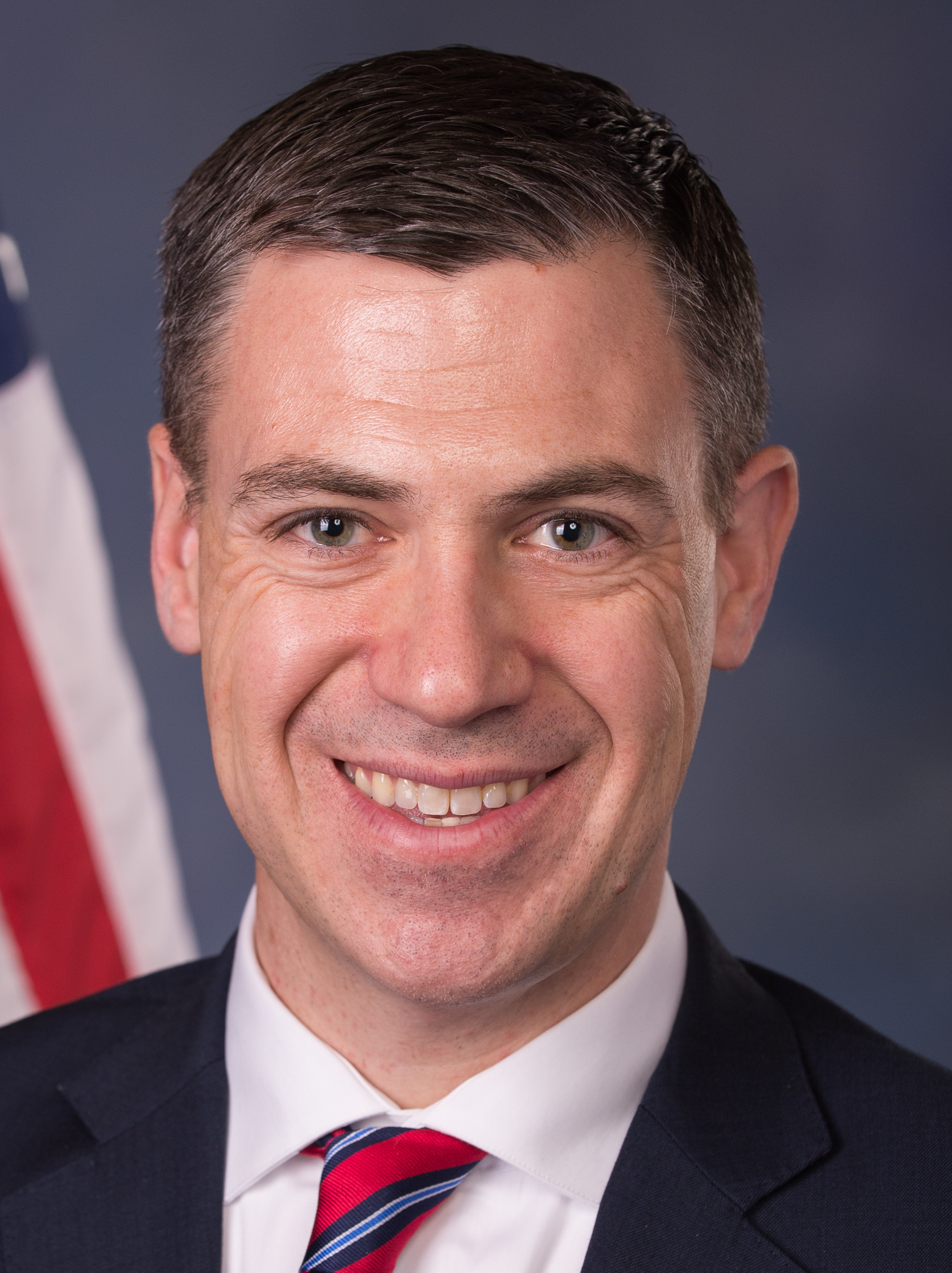

| Nominee | Jim Banks | Gary Snyder |
| Party | Republican | Democratic |
| Popular vote | 131,579 | 60,577 |
| Percentage | 65.3% | 30.1% |
- County results Banks: 50–60% 70–80%
U.S. Representative before election
Jim Banks
Republican
Elected U.S. Representative
Jim Banks
Republican

The 3rd district is based in northeastern Indiana, taking in Fort Wayne and the surrounding areas. The incumbent was Republican Jim Banks, who was re-elected with 67.8% of the vote in 2020.

=== Republican primary ===
==== Candidates ====
===== Nominee =====
- Jim Banks, incumbent U.S. representative and Chair of the Republican Study Committee

==== Endorsements ====
Jim Banks

U.S. executive branch officials

- Donald Trump, 45th president of the United States (2017–2021)

Organizations

- Huck PAC

==== Results ====
Republican primary results
| Party | Candidate | Votes | % |
|---|---|---|---|
| Republican | Jim Banks (incumbent) | 54,033 | 100.0 |
| Total votes | | 54,033 | 100.0 |

=== Democratic primary ===
==== Candidates ====
===== Nominee =====
- Gary Snyder, businessman

===== Eliminated in primary =====
- Phillip Beachy
- A. J. Calkins

===== Removed from ballot =====
- Tommy Schrader

==== Endorsements ====
Gary Snyder

Labor unions

- Indiana AFL–CIO

==== Results ====
Democratic primary results
| Party | Candidate | Votes | % |
|---|---|---|---|
| Democratic | Gary Snyder | 6,794 | 56.2 |
| Democratic | A. J. Calkins | 2,894 | 23.9 |
| Democratic | Phillip Beachy | 2,400 | 19.9 |
| Total votes | | 12,088 | 100.0 |

=== General election ===
==== Predictions ====
| Source | Ranking | As of |
|---|---|---|
| The Cook Political Report | Solid R | October 5, 2021 |
| Inside Elections | Solid R | October 13, 2021 |
| Sabato's Crystal Ball | Safe R | October 5, 2021 |
| Politico | Solid R | April 5, 2022 |
| RCP | Safe R | June 9, 2022 |
| Fox News | Solid R | July 11, 2022 |
| DDHQ | Solid R | July 20, 2022 |
| FiveThirtyEight | Solid R | July 6, 2022 |
| The Economist | Safe R | September 28, 2022 |

==== Results ====
2022 Indiana's 3rd congressional district election
| Party | Candidate | Votes | % |
|---|---|---|---|
| Republican | Jim Banks (incumbent) | 131,579 | 65.3 |
| Democratic | Gary Snyder | 60,577 | 30.1 |
| Independent | Nathan Gotsch | 9,386 | 4.7 |
| Total votes | | 201,542 | 100.0 |
| Republican hold | | | |

== District 4 ==
2022 Indiana's 4th congressional district election
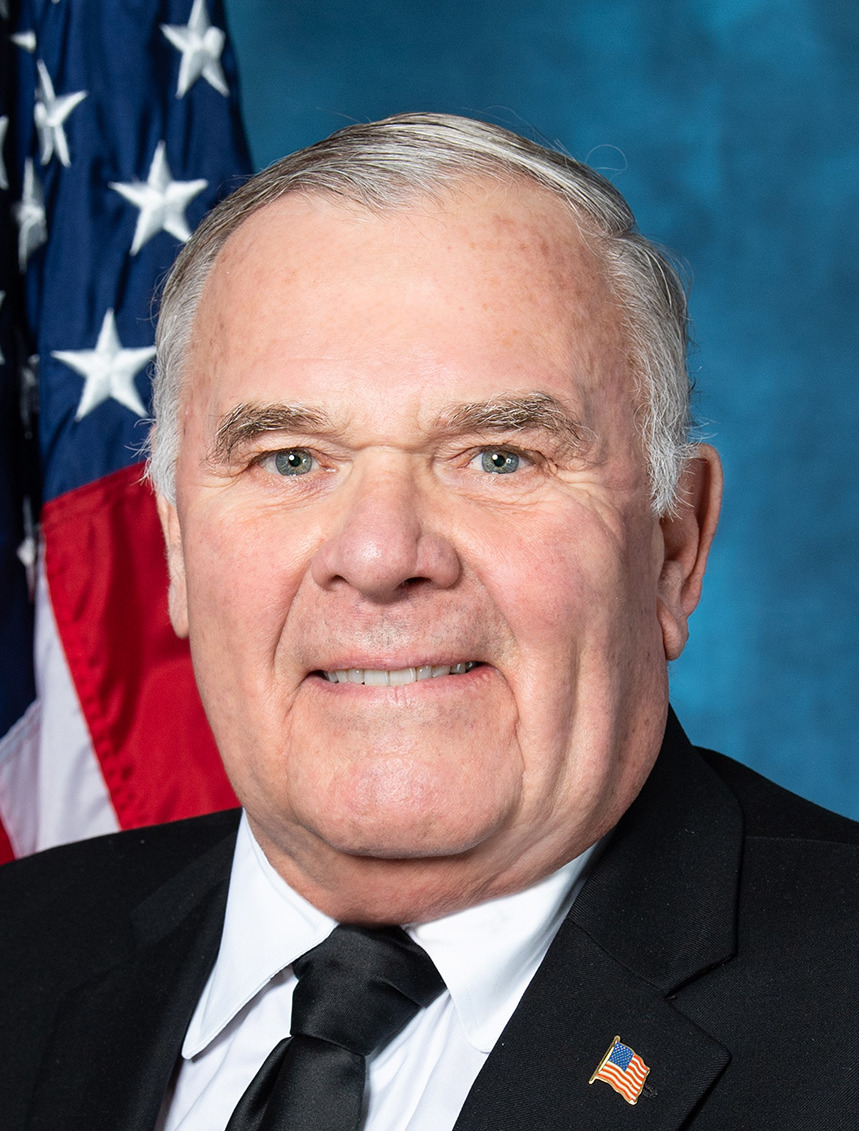

| Nominee | Jim Baird | Roger Day |
| Party | Republican | Democratic |
| Popular vote | 134,864 | 62,834 |
| Percentage | 68.2% | 31.8% |
- County results Baird: 50–60% 60–70% 70–80% 80–90%
U.S. Representative before election
Jim Baird
Republican
Elected U.S. Representative
Jim Baird
Republican

The 4th district is located in west-central Indiana, taking in Lafayette and the western suburbs of Indianapolis. The incumbent was Republican Jim Baird, who was elected with 66.6% of the vote in 2020.

=== Republican primary ===
==== Candidates ====
===== Nominee =====
- Jim Baird, incumbent U.S. representative

==== Removed from ballot ====
- T. Charles Bookwalter

=== Endorsements ===
Jim Baird

U.S. executive branch officials

- Donald Trump, 45th president of the United States (2017–2021)

Organizations

- Huck PAC

==== Results ====
Republican primary results
| Party | Candidate | Votes | % |
|---|---|---|---|
| Republican | Jim Baird (incumbent) | 50,342 | 100.0 |
| Total votes | | 50,342 | 100.0 |

=== Democratic primary ===
==== Candidates ====
===== Nominee =====
- Roger Day, businessman

===== Eliminated in primary =====
- Howard Pollchik

==== Results ====
Democratic primary results
| Party | Candidate | Votes | % |
|---|---|---|---|
| Democratic | Roger Day | 5,680 | 68.2 |
| Democratic | Howard Pollchik | 2,648 | 31.8 |
| Total votes | | 8,328 | 100.0 |

=== General election ===
==== Predictions ====
| Source | Ranking | As of |
|---|---|---|
| The Cook Political Report | Solid R | October 5, 2021 |
| Inside Elections | Solid R | October 13, 2021 |
| Sabato's Crystal Ball | Safe R | October 5, 2021 |
| Politico | Solid R | April 5, 2022 |
| RCP | Safe R | June 9, 2022 |
| Fox News | Solid R | July 11, 2022 |
| DDHQ | Solid R | July 20, 2022 |
| FiveThirtyEight | Solid R | July 6, 2022 |
| The Economist | Safe R | September 28, 2022 |

==== Results ====
2022 Indiana's 4th congressional district election
| Party | Candidate | Votes | % |
|---|---|---|---|
| Republican | Jim Baird (incumbent) | 134,864 | 68.2 |
| Democratic | Roger Day | 62,834 | 31.8 |
| Total votes | | 197,698 | 100.0 |
| Republican hold | | | |

== District 5 ==
2022 Indiana's 5th congressional district election
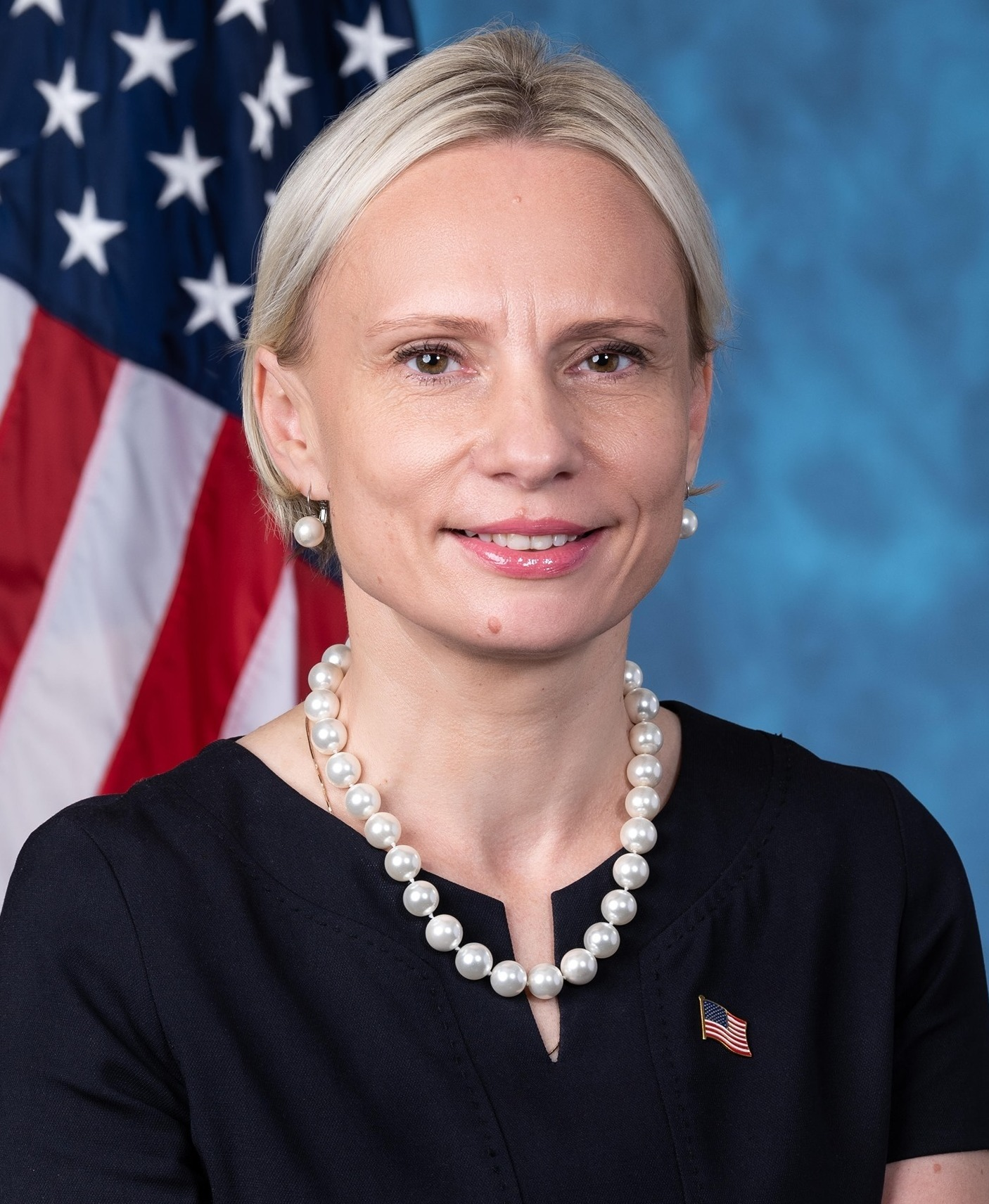

| Nominee | Victoria Spartz | Jeannine Lake |
| Party | Republican | Democratic |
| Popular vote | 146,575 | 93,434 |
| Percentage | 61.1% | 38.9% |
- County results Spartz: 50–60% 60–70% 70–80%
U.S. Representative before election
Victoria Spartz
Republican
Elected U.S. Representative
Victoria Spartz
Republican

The 5th district previously encompassed northern Indianapolis and its eastern and northern suburbs, including Marion, Carmel, Anderson, Noblesville, Fishers, Kokomo, and Muncie. Its boundaries were significantly redrawn in 2021 by the Republican legislature, removing it from Indianapolis entirely while extending it farther north and east into more rural areas. The incumbent was Republican Victoria Spartz, who was elected with 50.0% of the vote in 2020.

=== Republican primary ===
==== Candidates ====
===== Nominee =====
- Victoria Spartz, incumbent U.S. representative

==== Endorsements ====
Victoria Spartz

U.S. executive branch officials

- Donald Trump, 45th president of the United States (2017–2021)

Organizations

- Huck PAC
- Maggie's List

==== Results ====
Republican primary results
| Party | Candidate | Votes | % |
|---|---|---|---|
| Republican | Victoria Spartz (incumbent) | 47,128 | 100.0 |
| Total votes | | 47,128 | 100.0 |

=== Democratic primary ===
==== Candidates ====
===== Nominee =====
- Jeanine Lee Lake, journalist and nominee for Indiana's 6th congressional district in 2018 and 2020

===== Eliminated in primary =====
- Matthew Hall, former Lawrence city council member

===== Withdrew =====
- Melanie Wright, former state representative for the 35th district (running for state senate)

==== Endorsements ====
Jeanine Lee Lake

Labor unions

- Indiana AFL–CIO

Organizations

- National Women's Political Caucus

Newspapers

- The Herald Bulletin

==== Primary results ====
Democratic primary results
| Party | Candidate | Votes | % |
|---|---|---|---|
| Democratic | Jeanine Lee Lake | 10,192 | 60.0 |
| Democratic | Matthew Hall | 6,799 | 40.0 |
| Total votes | | 16,991 | 100.0 |

=== General election ===
==== Predictions ====
| Source | Ranking | As of |
|---|---|---|
| The Cook Political Report | Solid R | October 5, 2021 |
| Inside Elections | Solid R | October 13, 2021 |
| Sabato's Crystal Ball | Safe R | October 5, 2021 |
| Politico | Solid R | April 5, 2022 |
| RCP | Safe R | June 9, 2022 |
| Fox News | Solid R | July 11, 2022 |
| DDHQ | Solid R | July 20, 2022 |
| FiveThirtyEight | Solid R | July 6, 2022 |
| The Economist | Safe R | September 28, 2022 |

==== Results ====
2022 Indiana's 5th congressional district election
| Party | Candidate | Votes | % |
|---|---|---|---|
| Republican | Victoria Spartz (incumbent) | 146,575 | 61.1 |
| Democratic | Jeanine Lee Lake | 93,434 | 38.9 |
| Total votes | | 240,009 | 100.0 |
| Republican hold | | | |

== District 6 ==
2022 Indiana's 6th congressional district election
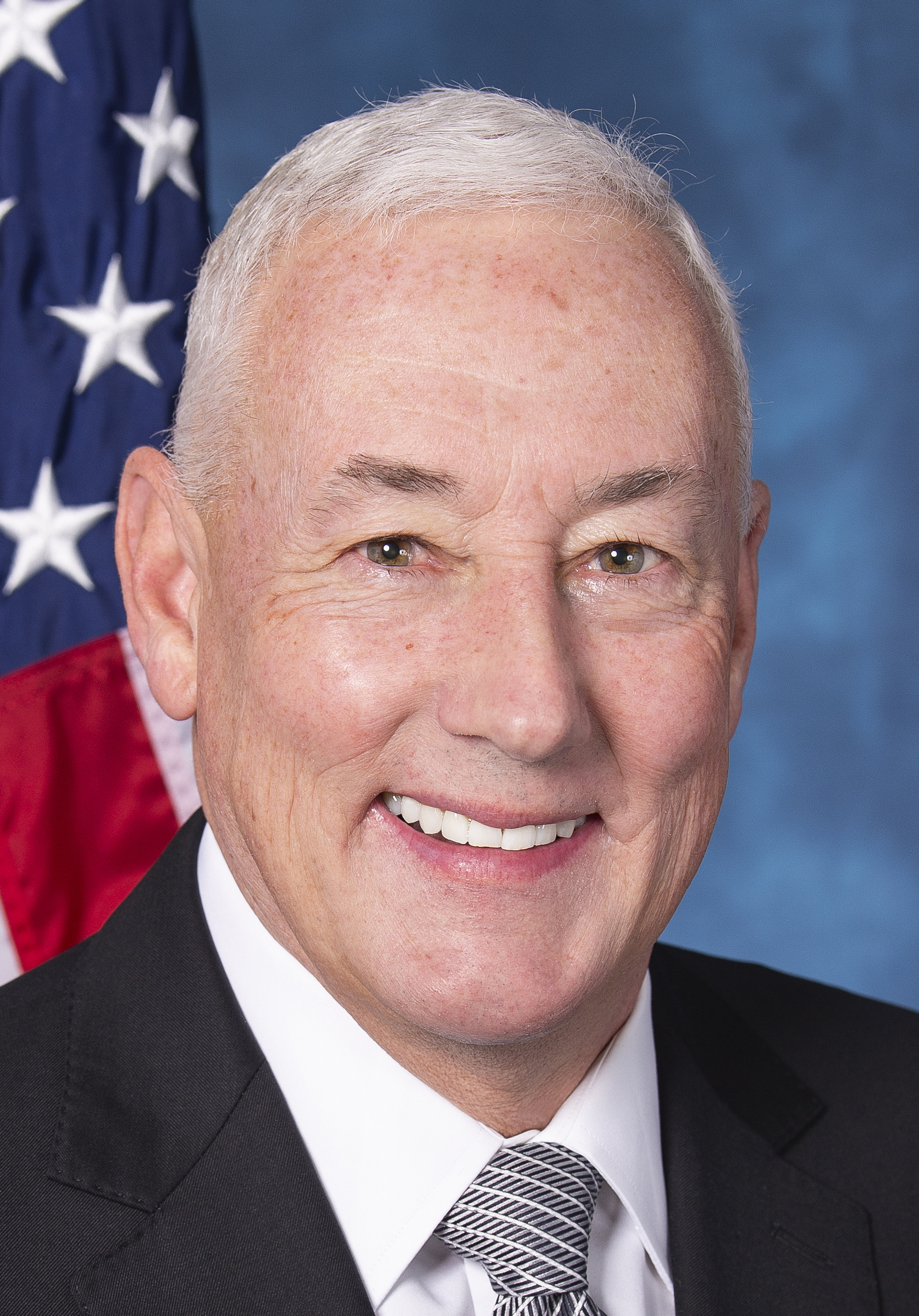

| Nominee | Greg Pence | Cinde Wirth |
| Party | Republican | Democratic |
| Popular vote | 130,686 | 62,838 |
| Percentage | 67.5% | 32.5% |
- County results Pence: 60–70% 70–80% 80–90%
U.S. Representative before election
Greg Pence
Republican
Elected U.S. Representative
Greg Pence
Republican

The 6th district is located in east-central Indiana, taking in, Columbus, Richmond and the southern suburbs of Indianapolis; part is inside Interstate 465, which was previously in the 7th district. The incumbent was Republican Greg Pence, who was elected with 68.6% of the vote in 2020.

=== Republican primary ===
==== Candidates ====
===== Nominee =====
- Greg Pence, incumbent U.S. representative

===== Eliminated in primary =====
- James Alspach

===== Removed from ballot =====
- Zach Smith

==== Endorsements ====
Greg Pence

U.S. executive branch officials

- Donald Trump, 45th president of the United States (2017–2021)

Organizations

- Huck PAC

==== Results ====
Republican primary results
| Party | Candidate | Votes | % |
|---|---|---|---|
| Republican | Greg Pence (incumbent) | 44,893 | 77.6 |
| Republican | James Alspach | 12,923 | 22.4 |
| Total votes | | 57,816 | 100.0 |

=== Democratic primary ===
==== Candidates ====
===== Nominee =====
- Cinde Wirth, teacher and nominee for state senator from the 44th district in 2020

===== Eliminated in primary =====
- George Holland

===== Removed from ballot =====
- Mark Powell

==== Endorsements ====
Cinde Wirth

Labor unions

- Indiana AFL–CIO

==== Results ====
Democratic primary results
| Party | Candidate | Votes | % |
|---|---|---|---|
| Democratic | Cinde Wirth | 9,057 | 73.1 |
| Democratic | George Holland | 3,337 | 26.9 |
| Total votes | | 12,394 | 100.0 |

=== General election ===
==== Predictions ====
| Source | Ranking | As of |
|---|---|---|
| The Cook Political Report | Solid R | October 5, 2021 |
| Inside Elections | Solid R | October 13, 2021 |
| Sabato's Crystal Ball | Safe R | October 5, 2021 |
| Politico | Solid R | April 5, 2022 |
| RCP | Safe R | June 9, 2022 |
| Fox News | Solid R | July 11, 2022 |
| DDHQ | Solid R | July 20, 2022 |
| FiveThirtyEight | Solid R | July 6, 2022 |
| The Economist | Safe R | September 28, 2022 |

==== Results ====
2022 Indiana's 6th congressional district election
| Party | Candidate | Votes | % |
|---|---|---|---|
| Republican | Greg Pence (incumbent) | 130,686 | 67.5 |
| Democratic | Cinde Wirth | 62,838 | 32.5 |
| Total votes | | 193,524 | 100.0 |
| Republican hold | | | |

== District 7 ==
2022 Indiana's 7th congressional district election
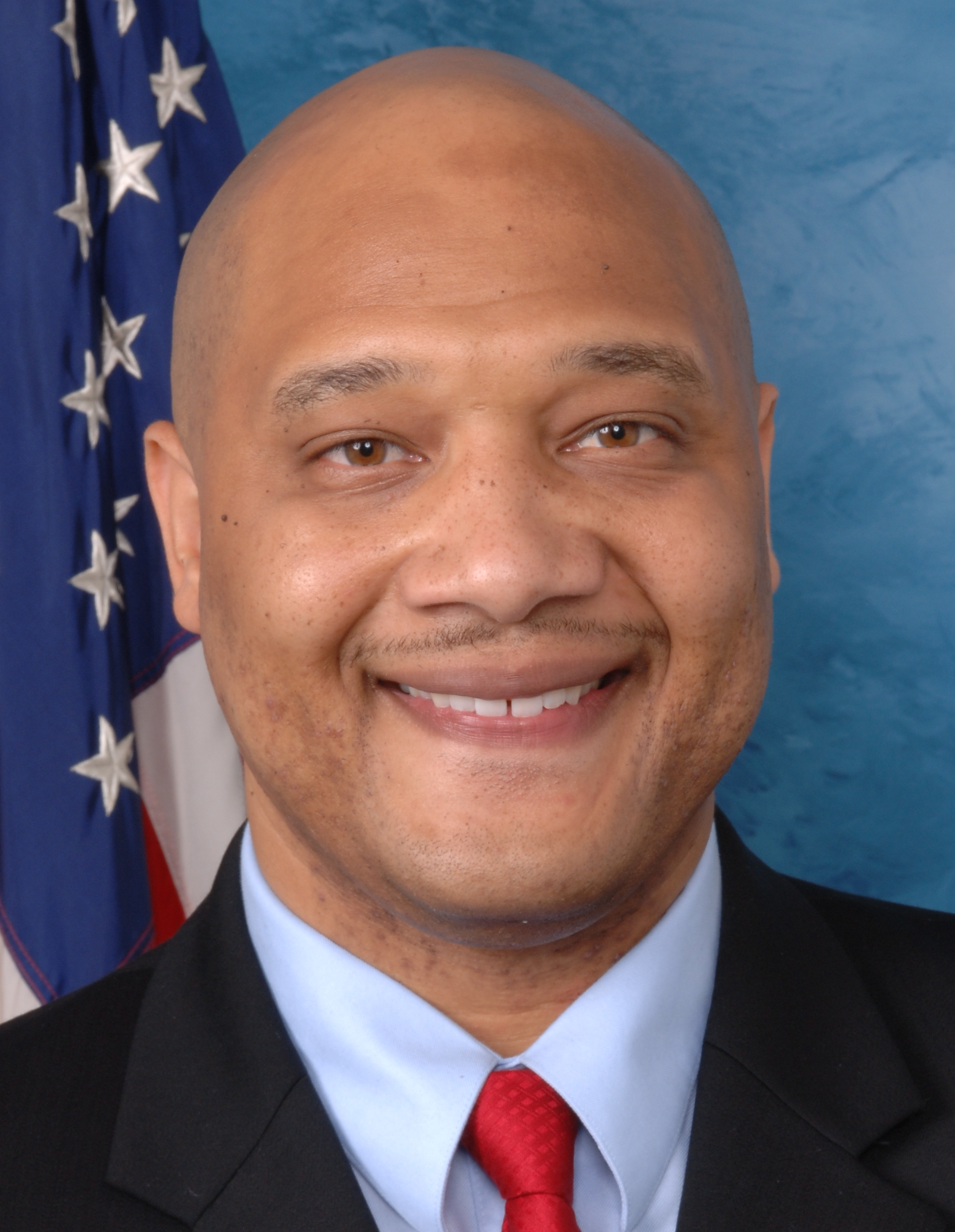

| Nominee | André Carson | Angela Grabovsky |
| Party | Democratic | Republican |
| Popular vote | 117,309 | 53,631 |
| Percentage | 67.0% | 30.6% |
- County result Carson: 60–70%
U.S. Representative before election
André Carson
Democratic
Elected U.S. Representative
André Carson
Democratic

The 7th district is centered around Indianapolis. It has moved slightly north since the 2010–2020 cycle to include some parts of the previous 5th district in northern Indianapolis; some southern portions of Indianapolis have moved away from the 7th into the 6th. The incumbent was Democrat André Carson, who was re-elected with 62.4% of the vote in 2020.

=== Democratic primary ===
==== Candidates ====
===== Nominee =====
- André Carson, incumbent U.S. representative

===== Eliminated in primary =====
- Curtis Godfrey
- Pierre Pullins

==== Endorsements ====
André Carson

Organizations

- Planned Parenthood Action Fund
- Sierra Club

Labor unions

- Indiana AFL–CIO

==== Results ====
Democratic primary results
| Party | Candidate | Votes | % |
|---|---|---|---|
| Democratic | André Carson (incumbent) | 36,242 | 93.9 |
| Democratic | Curtis Godfrey | 1,526 | 4.0 |
| Democratic | Pierre Pullins | 830 | 2.2 |
| Total votes | | 38,598 | 100.0 |

=== Republican primary ===
==== Candidates ====
===== Nominee =====
- Angela Grabovsky, financial advisor

===== Eliminated in primary =====
- Bill Allen
- Rusty Johnson
- Jennifer Pace
- Gerald Walters

==== Primary results ====
Republican primary results
| Party | Candidate | Votes | % |
|---|---|---|---|
| Republican | Angela Grabovsky | 6,886 | 53.6 |
| Republican | Rusty Johnson | 2,185 | 17.0 |
| Republican | Jennifer Pace | 1,556 | 12.1 |
| Republican | Bill Allen | 1,505 | 11.7 |
| Republican | Gerald Walters | 722 | 5.6 |
| Total votes | | 12,854 | 100.0 |

=== Libertarian convention ===
==== Candidates ====
===== Nominee =====
- Gavin Maple

=== General election ===
==== Predictions ====
| Source | Ranking | As of |
|---|---|---|
| The Cook Political Report | Solid D | October 5, 2021 |
| Inside Elections | Solid D | October 13, 2021 |
| Sabato's Crystal Ball | Safe D | October 5, 2021 |
| Politico | Solid D | April 5, 2022 |
| RCP | Safe D | June 9, 2022 |
| Fox News | Solid D | July 11, 2022 |
| DDHQ | Solid D | July 20, 2022 |
| FiveThirtyEight | Solid D | July 6, 2022 |
| The Economist | Safe D | September 28, 2022 |

==== Results ====
2022 Indiana's 7th congressional district election
| Party | Candidate | Votes | % |
|---|---|---|---|
| Democratic | André Carson (incumbent) | 117,309 | 67.0 |
| Republican | Angela Grabovsky | 53,631 | 30.6 |
| Libertarian | Gavin Maple | 4,240 | 2.4 |
| Total votes | | 175,180 | 100.0 |
| Democratic hold | | | |

== District 8 ==
2022 Indiana's 8th congressional district election
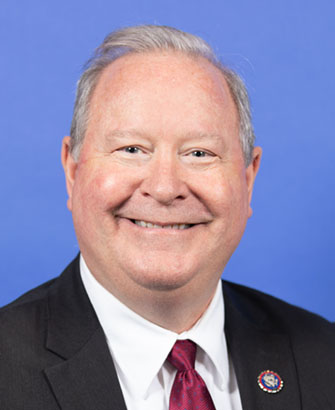

| Nominee | Larry Bucshon | Ray McCormick |
| Party | Republican | Democratic |
| Popular vote | 141,995 | 68,109 |
| Percentage | 65.7% | 31.5% |
- County results Bucshon: 50–60% 60–70% 70–80% 80–90%
U.S. Representative before election
Larry Bucshon
Republican
Elected U.S. Representative
Larry Bucshon
Republican

The 8th district is based in southwestern and west central Indiana, and includes the cities of Evansville and Terre Haute. The incumbent was Republican Larry Bucshon, who was re-elected with 66.9% of the vote in 2020.

=== Republican primary ===
==== Candidates ====
===== Nominee =====
- Larry Bucshon, incumbent U.S. representative

==== Endorsements ====
Larry Bucshon

U.S. executive branch officials

- Donald Trump, 45th president of the United States (2017–2021)

Organizations

- Huck PAC
- Log Cabin Republicans of Vanderburgh County

==== Results ====
Republican primary results
| Party | Candidate | Votes | % |
|---|---|---|---|
| Republican | Larry Bucshon (incumbent) | 47,557 | 100.0 |
| Total votes | | 47,557 | 100.0 |

=== Democratic primary ===
==== Candidates ====
===== Nominee =====
- Ray McCormick, farmer and conservationist

===== Eliminated in primary =====
- Adnan Dhahir
- Peter Priest

==== Endorsements ====
Ray McCormick

Labor unions

- Indiana AFL–CIO
- United Mine Workers

==== Results ====
Democratic primary results
| Party | Candidate | Votes | % |
|---|---|---|---|
| Democratic | Ray McCormick | 16,465 | 69.7 |
| Democratic | Adnan Dhahir | 4,429 | 18.7 |
| Democratic | Peter Priest | 2,731 | 11.6 |
| Total votes | | 23,625 | 100.0 |

=== Libertarian convention ===
==== Candidates ====
===== Nominee =====
- Andrew Horning, product manager

=== General election ===
==== Predictions ====
| Source | Ranking | As of |
|---|---|---|
| The Cook Political Report | Solid R | October 5, 2021 |
| Inside Elections | Solid R | October 13, 2021 |
| Sabato's Crystal Ball | Safe R | October 5, 2021 |
| Politico | Solid R | April 5, 2022 |
| RCP | Safe R | June 9, 2022 |
| Fox News | Solid R | July 11, 2022 |
| DDHQ | Solid R | July 20, 2022 |
| FiveThirtyEight | Solid R | July 6, 2022 |
| The Economist | Safe R | September 28, 2022 |

==== Results ====
2022 Indiana's 8th congressional district election
| Party | Candidate | Votes | % |
|---|---|---|---|
| Republican | Larry Bucshon (incumbent) | 141,995 | 65.7 |
| Democratic | Ray McCormick | 68,109 | 31.5 |
| Libertarian | Andrew Horning | 5,936 | 2.7 |
| Total votes | | 216,040 | 100.0 |
| Republican hold | | | |

== District 9 ==
2022 Indiana's 9th congressional district election
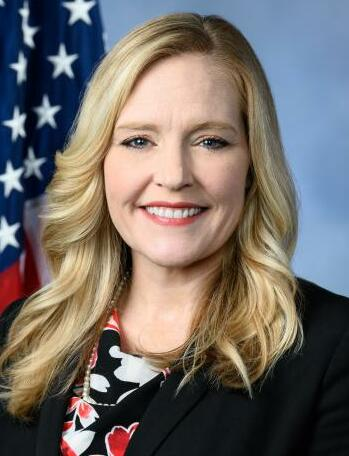

| Nominee | Erin Houchin | Matthew Fyfe |
| Party | Republican | Democratic |
| Popular vote | 143,166 | 75,700 |
| Percentage | 63.6% | 33.6% |
- County results Houchin: 50–60% 60–70% 70–80% 80–90% Fyfe: 60–70%
U.S. Representative before election
Trey Hollingsworth
Republican
Elected U.S. Representative
Erin Houchin
Republican

The 9th district is based in southeast Indiana, and includes the cities of Bloomington and Jeffersonville, the latter of which is in the Louisville metropolitan area. The incumbent was Republican Trey Hollingsworth, who was re-elected with 61.8% of the vote in 2020.

=== Republican primary ===
==== Candidates ====
===== Nominee =====
- Erin Houchin, former state senator (2014–2022) and candidate for this district in 2016

===== Eliminated in primary =====
- Jim Baker
- Stu Barnes-Israel, U.S. Army veteran
- J. Michael Davisson, state representative
- Dan Heiwig, U.S. Army combat veteran
- Eric Schansberg, economics professor at Indiana University Southeast and Libertarian nominee for this district in 2006 and 2008
- Mike Sodrel, former U.S. representative for this district (2005–2007)
- Bill Thomas
- Brian Tibbs

===== Declined =====
- Trey Hollingsworth, incumbent U.S. representative

==== Endorsements ====
Stu Barnes-Israel

U.S. executive branch officials

- Mike Pompeo, former U.S. Secretary of State (2018–2021) and former Director of the Central Intelligence Agency (2017–2018)

U.S. senators

- Tom Cotton, U.S. senator from Arkansas (2015–present)
Erin Houchin

U.S. representatives

- Susan Brooks, former U.S. representative from Indiana's 5th congressional district (2013–2021)
- Larry Bucshon, U.S. representative from Indiana's 8th congressional district (2011–2025)
- Elise Stefanik, U.S. representative from New York's 21st congressional district (2015–present)
- Jackie Walorski, U.S. representative from Indiana's 2nd congressional district (2013–2022)

Statewide officeholders

- Todd Rokita, Indiana Attorney General (2021–present), former U.S. representative for Indiana's 4th congressional district (2011–2019), and candidate for U.S. Senate in 2018

Local officials

- Justin Green, mayor of Salem

Organizations

- Elevate PAC
- Susan B. Anthony List

Individuals

- Jim Bopp, conservative election lawyer

==== Primary results ====
Primary results by county: Houchin: 30–40%; 40–50%; 50–60%; Sodrel: 30–40%; 40–50%; Barnes-Israel: 50–60%

Republican primary results
| Party | Candidate | Votes | % |
|---|---|---|---|
| Republican | Erin Houchin | 21,697 | 37.3 |
| Republican | Mike Sodrel | 15,008 | 25.8 |
| Republican | Stu Barnes-Israel | 12,193 | 21.0 |
| Republican | Jim Baker | 2,946 | 5.1 |
| Republican | J. Michael Davisson | 1,597 | 2.7 |
| Republican | Eric Schansberg | 1,559 | 2.7 |
| Republican | Brian Tibbs | 1,461 | 2.5 |
| Republican | Dan Heiwig | 919 | 1.6 |
| Republican | Bill Thomas | 756 | 1.3 |
| Total votes | | 58,136 | 100.0 |

=== Democratic primary ===
==== Candidates ====
===== Nominee =====
- Matthew Fyfe, teacher

===== Eliminated in primary =====
- Isak Nti Asare, Indiana University faculty member
- D. Liam Dorris, USMC veteran

==== Endorsements ====
Matthew Fyfe

Labor unions

- Indiana AFL–CIO

==== Primary results ====
Primary results by county: Fyfe: 50–60%; 60–70%; 70–80%

Democratic primary results
| Party | Candidate | Votes | % |
|---|---|---|---|
| Democratic | Matthew Fyfe | 12,240 | 56.8 |
| Democratic | Isak Nti Asare | 6,305 | 29.2 |
| Democratic | Liam Dorris | 3,023 | 14.0 |
| Total votes | | 21,568 | 100.0 |

=== Libertarian convention ===
==== Candidates ====
===== Nominee =====
- Tonya Millis, real estate broker

=== Green convention ===
==== Candidates ====
===== Nominee =====
- Jacob Bailey (write-in)

=== General election ===
==== Predictions ====
| Source | Ranking | As of |
|---|---|---|
| The Cook Political Report | Solid R | October 5, 2021 |
| Inside Elections | Solid R | October 13, 2021 |
| Sabato's Crystal Ball | Safe R | October 5, 2021 |
| Politico | Solid R | April 5, 2022 |
| RCP | Safe R | June 9, 2022 |
| Fox News | Solid R | July 11, 2022 |
| DDHQ | Solid R | July 20, 2022 |
| FiveThirtyEight | Solid R | July 6, 2022 |
| The Economist | Safe R | September 28, 2022 |

==== Post-primary endorsements ====
Erin Houchin

U.S. executive branch officials

- Donald Trump, 45th president of the United States

Organizations

- Huck PAC
- Indiana Right to Life
Matthew Fyfe (D)

Organizations

- Sierra Club

==== Results ====
2022 Indiana's 9th congressional district election
| Party | Candidate | Votes | % |
|---|---|---|---|
| Republican | Erin Houchin | 143,166 | 63.6 |
| Democratic | Matthew Fyfe | 75,700 | 33.6 |
| Libertarian | Tonya Millis | 6,374 | 2.8 |
| Green | Jacob Bailey (write-in) | 36 | 0.0 |
| Total votes | | 225,276 | 100.0 |
| Republican hold | | | |
