= 2024 United States Senate election in Indiana =

- November 5, 2024
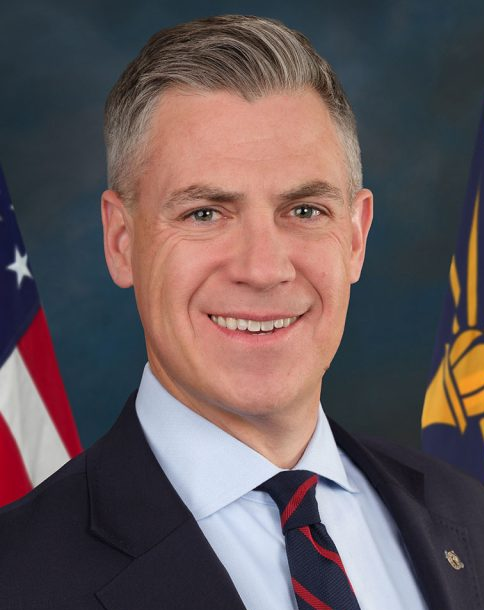

Nominee	Jim Banks	Valerie McCray
Party	Republican	Democratic
Popular vote	1,659,416	1,097,061
Percentage	58.64%	38.77%
- Banks: 40–50% 50–60% 60–70% 70–80% 80–90% >90% McCray: 40–50% 50–60% 60–70% 70–80% 80–90% >90% Tie: 40–50% 50% Other No votes
U.S. senator before election
Mike Braun
Republican
Elected U.S. senator
Jim Banks
Republican

The 2024 United States Senate election in Indiana was held on November 5, 2024, to elect a member of the United States Senate to represent the state of Indiana. Republican congressman Jim Banks was elected to his first term, defeating Democratic psychologist Valerie McCray in the general election. Banks succeeded Republican incumbent Mike Braun, who opted instead to run for governor. This was the first election for this seat in which there was no incumbent running since 1958. (Note: Richard Lugar, the incumbent Senator at the time, ran for re-election to a seventh term in 2012, but lost in the Republican primary to Richard Mourdock.)

On election day, Republican Banks defeated Democrat Valerie McCray by a near 20-percentage-point margin, winning all but three counties. Indiana has not elected a Democrat to the United States Senate since Joe Donnelly was elected in 2012.

== Republican primary ==
=== Candidates ===
==== Nominee ====
- Jim Banks, U.S. representative for Indiana's 3rd congressional district (2017–2025)

==== Disqualified ====
- John Rust, former chairmain of the board for Rose Acre Farms

==== Declined ====
- Mike Braun, incumbent U.S. senator (2019–2025) (successfully ran for governor)
- Mitch Daniels, former governor of Indiana (2005–2013), former president of Purdue University (2013–2022), and former director of the Office of Management and Budget (2001–2003)
- Eric Holcomb, governor of Indiana (2017–2025) and candidate for U.S. Senate in 2016
- Mike Pence, former vice president of the United States (2017–2021), former governor of Indiana (2013–2017), and former U.S. representative for Indiana's 5th congressional district (2001–2013) (unsuccessfully ran for president)
- Todd Rokita, Indiana attorney general (2021–present), former U.S. representative for Indiana's 4th congressional district (2011–2019), former Indiana secretary of state (2002–2010) and candidate for U.S. Senate in 2018 (successfully ran for re-election)
- Victoria Spartz, U.S. representative for Indiana's 5th congressional district (2021–present) (successfully ran for re-election)

=== Endorsements ===
Jim Banks (R)

Executive branch officials

- Stephen Miller, senior advisor to the president (2017–2021)
- Mike Pompeo, U.S. secretary of state (2018–2021), director of the CIA (2017–2018), and U.S. representative for Kansas's 4th congressional district (2011–2017)
- Donald Trump, 45th president of the United States (2017–2021)

U.S. senators

- John Barrasso, U.S. senator from Wyoming (2007–present)
- Marsha Blackburn, U.S. senator from Tennessee (2019–present)
- Mike Braun, U.S. senator from Indiana (2019–2025)
- Tom Cotton, U.S. senator from Arkansas (2015–present)
- Kevin Cramer, U.S. senator from North Dakota (2019–present)
- Ted Cruz, U.S. senator from Texas (2013–present)
- Steve Daines, U.S. senator from Montana (2015–present)
- Bill Hagerty, U.S. senator from Tennessee (2021–present)
- Cynthia Lummis, U.S. senator from Wyoming (2021–present)
- Mitch McConnell, U.S. senator from Kentucky (1985–present), Senate minority leader (2021–2025), and former Senate majority leader (2015–2021)
- Marco Rubio, U.S. senator from Florida (2011–2025)
- John Thune, U.S. senator from South Dakota (2005–present)
- Tommy Tuberville, U.S. senator from Alabama (2021–present)
- JD Vance, U.S. senator from Ohio (2023–2025)

U.S. representatives

- Susan Brooks, former U.S. representative for Indiana's 5th congressional district (2013–2021)
- Larry Bucshon, U.S. representative for Indiana's 8th congressional district (2011–2025)
- Erin Houchin, U.S. representative for Indiana's 9th congressional district (2023–present)
- Ronny Jackson, U.S. representative for Texas's 13th congressional district (2021–present)
- Greg Pence, U.S. representative for Indiana's 6th congressional district (2019–2025)
- Elise Stefanik, U.S. representative for New York's 21st congressional district (2015–present)

Statewide officials

- Suzanne Crouch, lieutenant governor of Indiana (2017–2025)

State legislators

- Justin Busch, state senator for the 16th district (2018–present)
- Michelle Davis, state representative for the 54th district (2020–present)

Individuals

- Charlie Kirk, activist
- Mark Levin, host of The Mark Levin Show and Life, Liberty & Levin

Political Parties

- Indiana Republican Party

Organizations

- AIPAC
- Catholic Vote
- Club for Growth
- Eagle Forum
- International Franchise Association
- NRA Political Victory Fund
- Susan B. Anthony Pro-Life America
- Turning Point Action

=== Fundraising ===
Campaign finance reports as of April 17, 2024
Candidate	Raised	Spent	Cash on hand
Jim Banks (R)	$4,731,928	$3,188,805	$2,878,607
Source: Federal Election Commission

=== Polling ===
Hypothetical polling

Poll source	Date(s) administered	Sample size (Note: Key: A – all adults RV – registered voters LV – likely voters V – unclear)	Margin of error	Jim Banks	Mitch Daniels	Trey Hollingsworth	Todd Rokita	Victoria Spartz	Other	Undecided
Bellwether Research	December 11–17, 2022	1,000 (LV)	–	14%	–	11%	16%	12%	9%	39%
Bellwether Research	December 11–17, 2022	1,000 (LV)	–	10%	32%	9%	7%	7%	6%	29%
Response:AI (Note: Poll sponsored by Spartz's campaign.)	December 9–16, 2022	503 (RV)	±4.3%	14%	35%	6%	—	14%	16% (Note: Jennifer Ruth-Green with 4%; Curtis Hill with 2%; "Someone else" with 10%)	17%

=== Results ===
Republican primary results
Party	Candidate	Votes	%
Republican	Jim Banks	475,729	100.00%
Total votes		475,729	100.00%

== Democratic primary ==
=== Candidates ===
==== Nominee ====
- Valerie McCray, psychologist and candidate for U.S. Senate in 2022

==== Eliminated in primary ====
- Marc Carmichael, former state representative (1986–1991) and nominee for Indiana's 2nd congressional district in 1996

==== Withdrew ====
- Keith Potts, former Indianapolis city councilor (2020–2023)

==== Declined ====
- Joe Donnelly, former U.S. ambassador to the Holy See (2022–2024) and former U.S. senator (2013–2019)
- Ron Klain, former White House chief of staff (2021–2023)

==== Endorsements ====
Valerie McCray

Labor unions

- Indiana AFL–CIO

=== Fundraising ===
Campaign finance reports as of June 30, 2024
Candidate	Raised	Spent	Cash on hand
Marc Carmichael (D)	$115,161 (Note: $1,000 of this total was self-funded by Carmichael)	$98,370	$16,125
Valerie McCray (D)	$61,506 (Note: $1,407 of this total was self-funded by McCray)	$45,953	$15,684
Keith Potts (D)	$99,485 (Note: $20,345 of this total was self-funded by Potts)	$98,302	$1,183
Source: Federal Election Commission

=== Results ===
Primary results by county: McCray: 50–60%; 60–70%; 70–80%; Carmichael: 50–60%; Tie: 50%

Democratic primary results
Party	Candidate	Votes	%
Democratic	Valerie McCray	121,734	68.01%
Democratic	Marc Carmichael	57,256	31.99%
Total votes		178,990	100.00%

== Libertarian convention ==
=== Nominee ===
- Andy Horning, engineer, perennial candidate, and nominee for U.S. Senate in 2012

== Write-in candidates ==
=== Declared ===
- Phillip Beachy, retired carpenter and Democratic candidate for Indiana's 3rd congressional district in 2022

== General election ==
=== Predictions ===
Source	Ranking	As of
The Cook Political Report	Solid R	November 9, 2023
Inside Elections	Solid R	November 9, 2023
Sabato's Crystal Ball	Safe R	November 9, 2023
Decision Desk HQ/The Hill	Safe R	June 8, 2024
Elections Daily	Safe R	May 4, 2023
CNalysis	Solid R	November 21, 2023
RealClearPolitics	Solid R	August 5, 2024
Split Ticket	Safe R	October 23, 2024
538	Solid R	October 23, 2024

=== Fundraising ===
Campaign finance reports as of June 30, 2024
Candidate	Raised	Spent	Cash on hand
Jim Banks (R)	$5,553,816	$3,713,830	$3,175,470
Valerie McCray (D)	$61,507 (Note: $4,407 of this total was self-funded by McCray)	$45,953	$15,685
Source: Federal Election Commission

=== Debate ===
2024 United States Senate general election in Indiana debate
No.	Date	Host	Moderator	Link	Participants		
Key: P Participant A Absent N Non-invitee I Invitee W Withdrawn							
Key: P Participant A Absent N Non-invitee I Invitee W Withdrawn					Banks	McCray	Horning
1	October 29, 2024	Indiana Debate Commission	Laura Merrifield Wilson		A	P	P

=== Polling ===
Poll source	Date(s) administered	Sample size	Margin of error	Jim Banks (R)	Valerie McCray (D)	Other	Undecided
ActiVote	October 5–28, 2024	400 (LV)	± 4.9%	57%	43%	–	–
ActiVote	September 3 – October 5, 2024	400 (LV)	± 4.9%	56%	44%	–	–
ARW Strategies (Note: Poll sponsored by IndyPolitics.org)	September 23–25, 2024	600 (LV)	–	49%	35%	–	16%
Emerson College (Note: Poll sponsored by The Hill)	September 12–13, 2024	1,000 (LV)	± 3.0%	47%	33%	5% (Note: Horning (L) with 5%)	14%
Emerson College	October 1–4, 2023	462 (RV)	± 4.4%	31%	22%	8% (Note: "Someone else" at 8%)	39%

=== Results ===
2024 United States Senate election in Indiana
Party	Candidate	Votes	%	±%
Republican	Jim Banks	1,659,416	58.64%	+7.91%
Democratic	Valerie McCray	1,097,061	38.77%	−6.07%
Libertarian	Andrew Horning	73,233	2.59%	−1.83%
Write-in		187	0.00%	
Total votes		2,829,897	100.0%	
Republican hold				

==== By county ====
County	Jim Banks Republican		Valerie McCray Democratic		Andrew Horning Libertarian		Write-in		Margin		Total
County	Votes	%	Votes	%	Votes	%	Votes	%	Votes	%	Total
Adams	9,453	76.38%	2,623	21.19%	300	2.42%	0	0.00%	6,830	55.19%	12,376
Allen	89,831	56.91%	64,275	40.72%	3,702	2.35%	29	0.02%	25,556	16.09%	157,837
Bartholomew	20,573	63.77%	10,790	33.45%	893	2.77%	3	0.01%	9,783	30.33%	32,259
Benton	2,887	73.55%	922	23.49%	116	2.96%	0	0.00%	1,965	50.06%	3,925
Blackford	3,554	73.72%	1,109	23.00%	157	3.26%	1	0.02%	2,445	50.72%	4,821
Boone	23,037	59.39%	14,596	37.63%	1,154	2.98%	1	0.00%	8,441	21.76%	38,788
Brown	5,392	63.86%	2,695	31.92%	357	4.23%	0	0.00%	2,697	31.94%	8,444
Carroll	6,898	75.21%	2,034	22.18%	240	2.62%	0	0.00%	4,864	53.03%	9,172
Cass	10,031	71.14%	3,661	25.96%	408	2.89%	0	0.00%	6,370	45.18%	14,100
Clark	32,978	57.66%	22,317	39.02%	1,889	3.30%	5	0.01%	10,661	18.64%	57,189
Clay	8,752	76.42%	2,375	20.74%	326	2.85%	0	0.00%	6,377	55.68%	11,453
Clinton	8,620	73.16%	2,803	23.79%	358	3.04%	2	0.02%	5,817	49.37%	11,783
Crawford	3,311	69.71%	1,312	27.62%	127	2.67%	0	0.00%	1,999	42.08%	4,750
Daviess	8,632	80.64%	1,829	17.09%	244	2.28%	0	0.00%	6,803	63.55%	10,705
Dearborn	20,655	78.20%	5,208	19.72%	551	2.09%	0	0.00%	15,447	58.48%	26,414
Decatur	8,971	78.39%	2,098	18.33%	375	3.28%	0	0.00%	6,873	60.06%	11,444
DeKalb	13,530	73.09%	4,429	23.93%	551	2.98%	2	0.01%	9,101	49.16%	18,512
Delaware	24,801	56.82%	17,590	40.30%	1,252	2.87%	2	0.00%	7,211	16.52%	43,645
Dubois	13,549	69.21%	5,436	27.77%	590	3.01%	2	0.01%	8,113	41.44%	19,577
Elkhart	46,298	66.42%	22,106	31.71%	1,300	1.86%	4	0.01%	24,192	34.70%	69,708
Fayette	7,066	76.22%	1,955	21.09%	250	2.70%	0	0.00%	5,111	55.13%	9,271
Floyd	23,053	56.62%	16,554	40.66%	1,101	2.70%	4	0.01%	6,499	15.96%	40,712
Fountain	6,224	78.60%	1,481	18.70%	214	2.70%	0	0.00%	4,743	59.89%	7,919
Franklin	9,043	80.49%	1,932	17.20%	260	2.31%	0	0.00%	7,111	63.29%	11,235
Fulton	6,580	74.90%	1,990	22.65%	213	2.42%	2	0.02%	4,590	52.25%	8,785
Gibson	11,424	73.60%	3,692	23.79%	406	2.62%	0	0.00%	7,732	49.81%	15,522
Grant	16,244	70.73%	6,160	26.82%	562	2.45%	1	0.00%	10,084	43.91%	22,967
Greene	10,146	74.23%	3,131	22.91%	391	2.86%	0	0.00%	7,015	51.32%	13,668
Hamilton	99,855	54.91%	77,761	42.76%	4,221	2.32%	9	0.00%	22,094	12.15%	181,846
Hancock	28,667	65.66%	13,067	29.93%	1,926	4.41%	0	0.00%	15,600	35.73%	43,660
Harrison	14,256	71.08%	5,234	26.10%	566	2.82%	0	0.00%	9,022	44.98%	20,056
Hendricks	48,718	61.01%	28,790	36.05%	2,343	2.93%	0	0.00%	19,928	24.96%	79,851
Henry	14,818	72.48%	5,023	24.57%	602	2.94%	0	0.00%	9,795	47.91%	20,443
Howard	25,369	66.02%	11,810	30.73%	1,247	3.25%	2	0.01%	13,559	35.28%	38,428
Huntington	12,579	73.47%	4,019	23.47%	523	3.05%	0	0.00%	8,560	50.00%	17,121
Jackson	13,946	75.96%	3,954	21.54%	460	2.51%	0	0.00%	9,992	54.42%	18,360
Jasper	11,204	75.48%	3,281	22.10%	358	2.41%	0	0.00%	7,923	53.38%	14,843
Jay	5,976	76.81%	1,594	20.49%	209	2.69%	1	0.01%	4,382	56.32%	7,780
Jefferson	8,943	66.21%	4,197	31.07%	367	2.72%	0	0.00%	4,746	35.14%	13,507
Jennings	8,816	76.34%	2,364	20.47%	368	3.19%	0	0.00%	6,452	55.87%	11,548
Johnson	45,502	66.57%	20,743	30.35%	2,098	3.07%	4	0.01%	24,759	36.23%	68,347
Knox	10,167	72.35%	3,501	24.91%	384	2.73%	0	0.00%	6,666	47.44%	14,052
Kosciusko	25,610	76.58%	6,920	20.69%	910	2.72%	1	0.00%	18,690	55.89%	33,441
LaGrange	7,806	78.32%	1,956	19.62%	204	2.05%	1	0.01%	5,850	58.69%	9,967
Lake	88,474	44.74%	105,648	53.43%	3,615	1.83%	8	0.00%	-17,174	-8.68%	197,745
LaPorte	24,752	55.34%	18,828	42.10%	1,137	2.54%	9	0.02%	5,924	13.25%	44,726
Lawrence	14,811	73.97%	4,586	22.90%	625	3.12%	0	0.00%	10,225	51.07%	20,022
Madison	34,393	62.19%	19,190	34.70%	1,716	3.10%	3	0.01%	15,203	27.49%	55,302
Marion	126,643	35.89%	217,819	61.72%	8,425	2.39%	22	0.01%	-91,176	-25.84%	352,909
Marshall	13,495	72.04%	4,838	25.83%	400	2.14%	0	0.00%	8,657	46.21%	18,733
Martin	3,633	75.39%	1,002	20.79%	183	3.80%	1	0.02%	2,631	54.60%	4,819
Miami	9,983	75.51%	2,850	21.56%	387	2.93%	0	0.00%	7,133	53.96%	13,220
Monroe	21,187	36.11%	35,960	61.29%	1,512	2.58%	9	0.02%	-14,773	-25.18%	58,668
Montgomery	12,101	73.85%	3,806	23.23%	478	2.92%	1	0.01%	8,295	50.62%	16,386
Morgan	25,306	75.30%	7,103	21.14%	1,196	3.56%	0	0.00%	18,203	54.17%	33,605
Newton	4,860	75.55%	1,352	21.02%	221	3.44%	0	0.00%	3,508	54.53%	6,433
Noble	13,710	75.26%	4,035	22.15%	463	2.54%	8	0.04%	9,675	53.11%	18,216
Ohio	2,254	75.13%	670	22.33%	76	2.53%	0	0.00%	1,584	52.80%	3,000
Orange	5,947	73.83%	1,897	23.55%	211	2.62%	0	0.00%	4,050	50.28%	8,055
Owen	6,744	71.75%	2,153	22.91%	502	5.34%	0	0.00%	4,591	48.85%	9,399
Parke	4,768	76.72%	1,274	20.50%	173	2.78%	0	0.00%	3,494	56.22%	6,215
Perry	4,961	61.61%	2,936	36.46%	155	1.92%	0	0.00%	2,025	25.15%	8,052
Pike	4,166	75.17%	1,226	22.12%	150	2.71%	0	0.00%	2,940	53.05%	5,542
Porter	46,011	54.30%	36,931	43.58%	1,786	2.11%	10	0.01%	9,080	10.72%	84,738
Posey	9,147	71.46%	3,366	26.29%	288	2.25%	0	0.00%	5,781	45.16%	12,801
Pulaski	4,031	75.32%	1,158	21.64%	163	3.05%	0	0.00%	2,873	53.68%	5,352
Putnam	11,918	74.39%	3,572	22.30%	530	3.31%	0	0.00%	8,346	52.10%	16,020
Randolph	7,533	75.61%	2,170	21.78%	260	2.61%	0	0.00%	5,363	53.83%	9,963
Ripley	11,286	79.24%	2,640	18.54%	315	2.21%	1	0.01%	8,646	60.71%	14,242
Rush	5,532	75.90%	1,498	20.55%	258	3.54%	1	0.01%	4,034	55.34%	7,289
St. Joseph	54,590	49.60%	53,253	48.38%	2,210	2.01%	13	0.01%	1,337	1.21%	110,066
Scott	6,042	69.64%	2,393	27.58%	241	2.77%	0	0.00%	3,649	42.06%	8,676
Shelby	13,495	72.14%	4,465	23.87%	747	3.99%	0	0.00%	9,030	48.27%	18,707
Spencer	7,051	70.76%	2,700	27.10%	213	2.14%	0	0.00%	4,351	43.67%	9,964
Starke	7,035	73.36%	2,279	23.76%	276	2.88%	0	0.00%	4,756	49.59%	9,590
Steuben	11,345	72.10%	4,004	25.45%	385	2.45%	1	0.01%	7,341	46.65%	15,735
Sullivan	5,898	72.62%	2,031	25.01%	193	2.38%	0	0.00%	3,867	47.61%	8,122
Switzerland	3,156	76.18%	914	22.06%	73	1.76%	0	0.00%	2,242	54.12%	4,143
Tippecanoe	31,699	49.79%	30,091	47.26%	1,868	2.93%	11	0.02%	1,608	2.53%	63,669
Tipton	5,617	74.21%	1,675	22.13%	277	3.66%	0	0.00%	3,942	52.08%	7,569
Union	2,606	76.04%	694	20.25%	127	3.71%	0	0.00%	1,912	55.79%	3,427
Vanderburgh	41,084	56.29%	30,403	41.65%	1,503	2.06%	2	0.00%	10,681	14.63%	72,992
Vermillion	4,645	68.65%	1,930	28.52%	190	2.81%	1	0.01%	2,715	40.13%	6,766
Vigo	22,898	56.99%	16,282	40.53%	995	2.48%	2	0.00%	6,616	16.47%	40,177
Wabash	10,102	75.28%	2,973	22.15%	344	2.56%	1	0.01%	7,129	53.12%	13,420
Warren	3,362	77.54%	879	20.27%	95	2.19%	0	0.00%	2,483	57.26%	4,336
Warrick	20,314	65.07%	10,227	32.76%	674	2.16%	4	0.01%	10,087	32.31%	31,219
Washington	9,219	74.32%	2,783	22.44%	401	3.23%	1	0.01%	6,436	51.89%	12,404
Wayne	17,083	64.81%	8,376	31.78%	896	3.40%	2	0.01%	8,707	33.03%	26,357
Wells	10,135	78.66%	2,379	18.46%	370	2.87%	0	0.00%	7,756	60.20%	12,884
White	7,900	72.75%	2,650	24.40%	309	2.85%	0	0.00%	5,250	48.35%	10,859
Whitley	12,729	74.30%	3,855	22.50%	548	3.20%	0	0.00%	8,874	51.80%	17,132

===== Counties that flipped from Democratic to Republican =====
- Delaware (largest city: Muncie)
- LaPorte (largest city: Michigan City)
- Porter (largest city: Portage)
- Vigo (largest city: Terre Haute)
- St. Joseph (largest municipality: South Bend)
- Tippecanoe (largest municipality: Lafayette)

==== By congressional district ====
Banks won seven of nine congressional districts.

District	Banks	McCray	Representative
1st	48%	50%	Frank J. Mrvan
2nd	63%	35%	Rudy Yakym
3rd	66%	32%	Jim Banks (118th Congress)
3rd	66%	32%	Marlin Stutzman (119th Congress)
4th	64%	33%	Jim Baird
5th	59%	38%	Victoria Spartz
6th	65%	31%	Greg Pence (118th Congress)
6th	65%	31%	Jefferson Shreve (119th Congress)
7th	29%	69%	André Carson
8th	66%	31%	Larry Bucshon (118th Congress)
8th	66%	31%	Mark Messmer (119th Congress)
9th	63%	34%	Erin Houchin

== Notes ==
Partisan clients
