= Steve Davisson =

American politician (1957–2021)

Member of the Indiana House of Representatives from the 73rd district
- In office November 16, 2010 – September 19, 2021
- Preceded by: Dennie R. Oxley Sr.
- Succeeded by: J. Michael Davisson

Personal details
- Born: November 27, 1957 Scottsburg, Indiana, U.S.
- Died: September 19, 2021 (aged 63) Salem, Indiana, U.S.
- Party: Republican
- Children: 5, including J. Michael Davisson
- Education: Purdue University (BS)

Steven Joseph Davisson (November 27, 1957 – September 19, 2021) was an American politician and pharmacist. He was a Republican member of the Indiana House of Representatives from 2010 until his death.

Davisson died from cancer at his home in Salem, Indiana, on September 19, 2021, at age 63.
