= Luke Kenley =

American politician

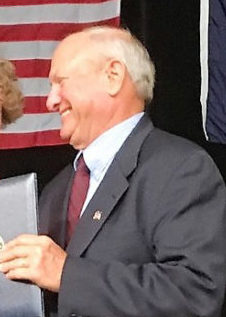

Member of the Indiana Senate from the 20th district
- In office November 17, 1992 – September 30, 2017
- Preceded by: Anthony C. Maidenberg
- Succeeded by: Victoria Spartz

Judge of the Noblesville City Court
- In office March 16, 1974 – September 1, 1989
- Appointed by: Max E. Robinson
- Preceded by: Jerry Barr
- Succeeded by: Stephen H. Free

Personal details
- Born: Howard A. Kenley; March 28, 1945 (age 81) Fort Stockton, Texas, U.S.
- Party: Republican
- Spouse: Sarah
- Children: 3
- Education: Miami University (AB); Harvard University (JD)
- Occupation: Politician

Military service
- Allegiance: United States
- Branch/service: United States Army
- Years of service: 1969–1971
- Rank: First Lieutenant

Howard "Luke" A. Kenley (born March 28, 1945) is an American politician who served as a member of the Indiana Senate and city court judge of Noblesville, Indiana.

== Early life and education ==
Kenley was born in Fort Stockton, Texas and attended both Miami University and Harvard Law School. He served in the United States Army from 1969 to 1971. He reached the rank of First Lieutenant.

== Career ==
He represented the 20th District in the Indiana Senate. A Republican, Kenley was first elected to the Indiana State Senate in 1992, defeating incumbent Anthony C. Maidenberg. He took office on November 17, 1992. Before becoming a State Senator, Kenley served as a judge for Noblesville City Court from March 16, 1974, to September 1, 1989. He was appointed by Noblesville Mayor Max E. Robinson after incumbent judge, Jerry Barr, resigned. He was replaced by Stephen H. Free.

He made an unsuccessful bid to become the Republican nominee for Governor of Indiana in 2003, losing to Mitch Daniels. He retired from the Senate on September 30, 2017. He was replaced by Victoria Spartz.
