= Marc Carmichael =

American politician (born 1950)

Member of the Indiana House of Representatives from the 35th district
- In office November 18, 1986 – August 30, 1991
- Preceded by: James Dailey
- Succeeded by: Patricia Eddy

Personal details
- Born: February 21, 1950 (age 76) Muncie, Indiana, U.S.
- Party: Democratic
- Education: University of Notre Dame (BA)

Robert Marc Carmichael (born February 21, 1950) is an American politician from the state of Indiana. A member of the Democratic Party, Carmichael represented the 35th district in the Indiana House of Representatives from 1986 to 1991.

== Biography ==
Carmichael has served as director of Governmental Affairs for the Indiana Gas Company and was the president of the Indiana Beverage Alliance from 1999 to 2020. Carmichael earned a Bachelor of Arts from the University of Notre Dame. Carmichael ran for U.S. Senate in the 2024 election. He lost in the Democratic primary to Valerie McCray. He was previously the Democratic nominee for Indiana's 2nd congressional district in 1996, losing to Republican incumbent David McIntosh by a margin of 17.95%.
