= J. Michael Davisson =

American politician and businessman

Member of the Indiana House of Representatives from the 73rd district
- In office October 28, 2021 – November 22, 2022
- Preceded by: Steve Davisson
- Succeeded by: Jennifer Meltzer

Personal details
- Party: Republican
- Relations: Steve Davisson (father)
- Education: Indiana University (BA)

Military service
- Branch/service: United States Army

J. Michael Davisson is an American politician and businessman serving as a member of the Indiana House of Representatives from the 73rd district. He assumed office on October 28, 2021, succeeding his father, Steve Davisson.

== Education ==
Davisson graduated from Salem High School in Salem, Indiana, and earned a Bachelor of Arts degree from Indiana University.

== Career ==
Davisson served in the United States Army for 17 years. Outside of politics, he operate Good Living Pharmacy. In October 2021, he was selected to succeed his father, Steve Davisson, in the Indiana House of Representatives. In February 2022, he declared his candidacy for Indiana's 9th congressional district in the 2022 election. In the May 2022 Republican primary, Davisson placed fifth in a field of nine candidates.
