= Victoria Spartz =

Ukrainian-American politician (born 1978)

- Вікторія Спартц
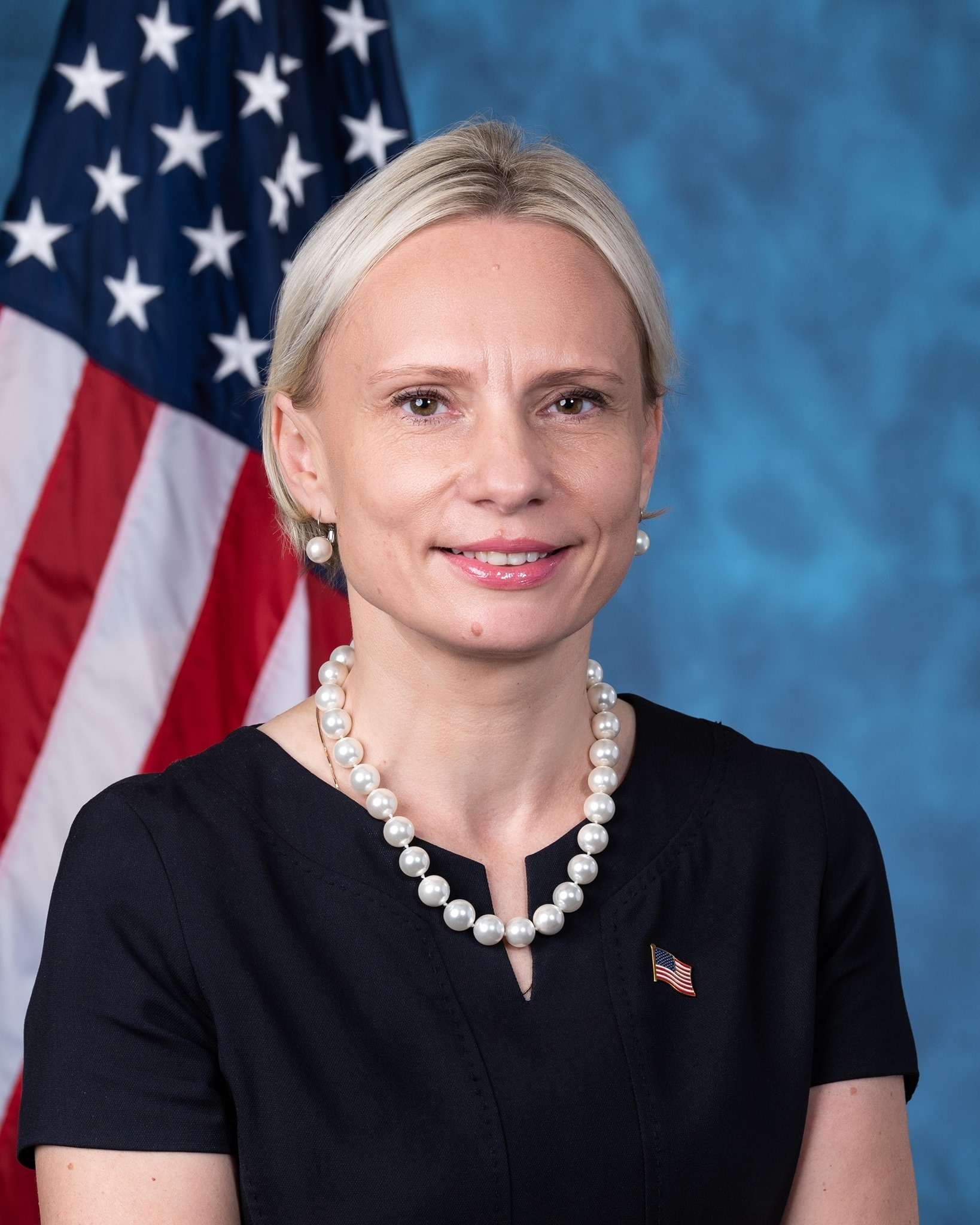
- Official portrait, 2021

Member of the U.S. House of Representatives from Indiana's 5th district
- Incumbent
- Assumed office January 3, 2021
- Preceded by: Susan Brooks
- Succeeded by: J. D. Ford (elect)

Member of the Indiana Senate from the 20th district
- In office October 1, 2017 – November 17, 2020
- Preceded by: Luke Kenley
- Succeeded by: Scott Baldwin

Personal details
- Born: Viktoriya Kulheyko; October 6, 1978 (age 48) Nosovka, Ukrainian SSR, Soviet Union (now Nosivka, Ukraine)
- Party: Republican
- Spouse: Jason Spartz (m. 2000)
- Children: 2
- Education: Kyiv National Economic University (BS, MBA); Indiana University, Indianapolis (MAcc)
- Website: House website Campaign website
- Spartz's voice Spartz on the Russian invasion of Ukraine. Recorded March 2, 2022

Victoria Spartz (née Kulheyko; (Note: Ukrainian: Вікторія Кульгейко, romanized: Viktoriia Kulheiko) born October 6, 1978) is a Ukrainian-born American politician and businesswoman who is the U.S. representative for Indiana's 5th congressional district. Spartz is a member of the Republican Party, and in the House, served on its Judiciary Committee (with subcommittee interests related to immigration and administrative, regulatory, and antitrust issues). She previously represented the 20th district in the Indiana Senate. Spartz lost reelection in 2026, being defeated by Democratic state senator J. D. Ford in what was considered a major upset.

== Early life and education ==
Victoria Kulheyko was born in Nosivka, Chernihiv Oblast, Ukraine, at the time a part of the Soviet Union. She lived with her grandparents until the age of five, when they moved to Chernihiv. There, she studied in a lyceum and graduated with a gold medal.

Spartz earned a bachelor of science degree and a master of business administration degree from Kyiv National Economic University.

Spartz immigrated to the United States in 2000 at the age of 22 and became a U.S. citizen in 2006. She earned a master of accountancy from the Kelley School of Business of Indiana University – Purdue University Indianapolis.

== Pre-congressional career ==
Spartz held a certified public accountant license from 2010 to 2021 and a real estate broker license from 2003 to 2020, both from the State of Indiana.

Spartz was a founding member of the Hamilton County, Indiana Tea Party. She served as CFO in the Indiana Attorney General's office before her appointment to the Indiana Senate. She was also an adjunct faculty member at the Kelley School of Business in Indianapolis and has owned real estate and farming businesses.

In 2017, Spartz was appointed to the Indiana Senate from the 20th district after Luke Kenley resigned.

== U.S. House of Representatives ==
=== Tenure ===
Spartz is the first Ukrainian-born person to serve as a member of the United States Congress.

In late 2020, Spartz was identified as a participant in the Freedom Force, a group of incoming Republican members of the House of Representatives who "say they're fighting against socialism in America."

In September 2021, Business Insider reported that Spartz had violated the Stop Trading on Congressional Knowledge (STOCK) Act of 2012, a federal transparency and conflict-of-interest law, by failing to properly disclose a purchase of stock in Simon Property Group worth between $15,001 and $50,000.

Spartz's tenure was marked by high staff turnover. Congressional watchdog Legistorm measured her turnover in 2021 at three and half times the average of offices of House members, the highest turnover for a non-retiring member. In May 2022, Politico reported on what it described as a "toxic" environment within her office, with Spartz's temper quickly jumping from tepid to boiling, and reported that "aides who have left after a couple of months did so because the work environment became untenable". Examples of the office environment included Spartz ordering staff to record her direction to them and later denying the previously expressed instructions, despite the recordings. One former aide said, "the common theme: Staffers do their job, and then Victoria comes in saying that they have no idea what they're doing, that they are 'morons,' calling them 'idiots'". Spartz responded that her working style is "not for everyone" and that her critics "need to 'toughen up'".

In June 2024, Spartz's chief of staff quit after less than a month on the job and her communications director quit after less than five months on the job. That same month, it was reported that the House ethics committee opened a probe into the allegations against Spartz of "abuse", "general toxicity", and "rage" towards her staff. While the allegations were made prior to the congressional primaries held on May 7, the probe was delayed until after the primary in order to avoid a "potential appearance of meddling in the election."

==== 2023 speaker elections ====
In January 2023, during the 2023 Speaker of the United States House of Representatives election, Spartz declined to vote for party nominee Kevin McCarthy on ballots four through 11, voting "present" instead. She voted for McCarthy on the first three ballots and on the 12th through 15th ballots. After McCarthy became speaker, she was critical of his speakership. She voted against tabling (that is, setting aside without debate) a motion to vacate brought against McCarthy, but ultimately voted against his removal on October 3, 2023. In the first ballot on the vote for a new speaker, Spartz refused to vote for the party nominee, Jim Jordan, casting instead a vote for Thomas Massie. She did vote for the party nominee in all subsequent ballots.

==== Russian invasion of Ukraine ====
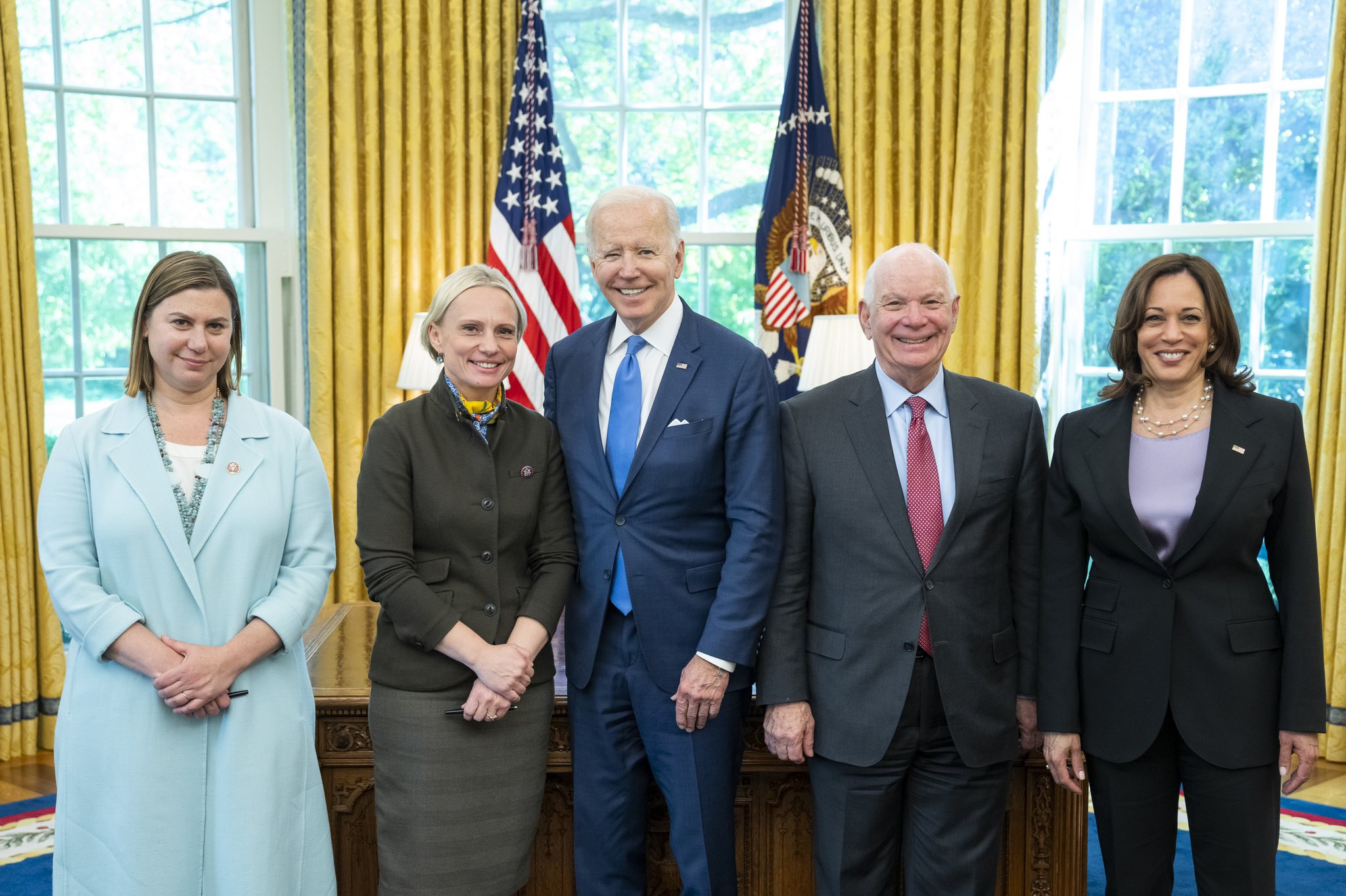
Spartz (second from left) joins President Biden, Rep. Elissa Slotkin, Vice President Harris, and Senator Ben Cardin for the signing of the Ukraine Democracy Defense Lend-Lease Act of 2022. May 2022

Spartz called the Russian invasion of Ukraine starting in early 2022 "a genocide of the Ukrainian people by a crazy man". Spartz was one of the first US officials to call Russian actions "war crimes". At the time of the invasion, Spartz had family still living in Ukraine, including her grandmother, who was living in Chernihiv, which was under siege by Russia.

During the ongoing invasion, Spartz traveled to Ukraine twice in April 2022. The first time was an unannounced visit to Bucha with U.S. Senator Steve Daines. Spartz and Daines were the first two U.S. officials to visit Ukraine since the war started. The second trip was to Lviv, Kyiv, and Odesa with Representative Tim Walberg. During the trip, Spartz met with Epiphanius of Kyiv. Spartz has been critical of the speed and effectiveness of international humanitarian aid efforts.

In July 2022, Spartz criticized Ukrainian president Volodymyr Zelenskyy, accusing him of "playing politics and theater" and not governing seriously. In an interview with Ukrainian press, she accused the country's leaders of not preparing for war and not understanding the war's importance. She asserted that there is insufficient monitoring of U.S.-provided weaponry, and that Congress needs to take control in this area.

Also in July, Spartz enumerated six allegations against Andrii Yermak, a top official in Ukraine's government. Among the accusations were leaking important secret information to Belarus and Russia by Yermak, mismanaging peace negotiations he conducted with Dmitry Kozak just before the war, and then falsely "assuring Ukrainian leadership that no attack by Russia was going to happen" in February 2022, "contrary to western intelligence, to prevent Ukraine from properly preparing for the war", and through his deputy Oleh Tatarov delaying the appointment of an anti-corruption prosecutor. Spartz asked the White House to investigate the allegations and report to a Congressional oversight committee.

The Foreign Ministry of Ukraine responded that Spartz's allegations with regard to Andrii Yermak were "baseless speculation". Former U.S. ambassador to Russia Michael McFaul, who has been working with Yermak on sanctions policy, said: "Yermak most certainly does not strike me as being pro-Russian. He is stridently anti-Putin and his barbaric regime." Some Republican representatives and senators disagreed with Spartz's accusations and believed the accusations could hurt the war effort and damage U.S. relations with Ukraine, while boosting GOP elements who opposed aid to Ukraine.

In 2024, Spartz voted against a crucial $60 billion aid package for Ukraine, shortly after being accused by a primary challenger of prioritizing aid to Ukraine over domestic Republican priorities including the border wall. Her vote against the U.S. aid for Ukraine came just three days after a Russian missile strike on Chernihiv, where her family lived, killed 18 civilians and injured 78. Having previously been lauded in Chernihiv for her life story and as "one of their own", some inhabitants' reactions were described as pride turning into "anger" and a "sense of betrayal" due to her vote against the aid, intensified after the Russian bombing during rush hour on her hometown.

==== Committee assignments ====
For the 118th Congress:

- Committee on the Judiciary
  - Subcommittee on Immigration Integrity, Security, and Enforcement
  - Subcommittee on the Administrative State, Regulatory Reform, and Antitrust

==== Caucus membership ====
- Republican Study Committee
- Congressional Ukraine Caucus
- House Baltic Caucus
- Bulgaria Caucus
- French Caucus
- German-American Caucus
- Caucus on Hellenic Issues
- Slovak Caucus
- Caucus on Poland
- United Kingdom Caucus

== Political positions ==
=== Health care ===
In a May 2020 campaign advertisement, Spartz touted her opposition to the Affordable Care Act; after winning the Republican primary, she muted her opposition to it. She voted in 2026 against extending the Affordable Care Act enhanced tax credits.

In 2021, Spartz was chosen to serve on the House Republican Caucus's Affordability Subcommittee of Health Care Task Force. In 2022, she released "a slate of bills aimed at cracking down on health care costs" through curbing anti-competitive conduct in the healthcare industry.

Spartz has introduced legislation to empower the Federal Trade Commission (FTC) to rein in hospital mergers. In December 2022, she and Representative Pramila Jayapal introduced the Stop Anticompetitive Healthcare Act. In an op-ed for The Hill, Spartz argued that hospital monopolies are harming healthcare.

=== Socialism ===
Spartz, who was born in Ukraine during the Soviet period, has criticized the resurgence in popularity of socialism in the United States. According to The Indianapolis Star, her upbringing "at least in part formed her belief that government involvement is inherently bad and ineffective and should only be used as a tool to incentivize society's betterment."

=== United States government debt ===
In her rhetoric, Spartz has characterized herself as a fiscal hawk.

In October 2023, Spartz said that she would resign unless a commission to manage the national debt is created before the end of 2024. Two days prior to her statements she voted against a measure to end a government shutdown. Earlier that year, Spartz co-sponsored the Fiscal Commission Act of 2023, which would create a commission to help resolve looming government debt in the U.S.

In 2025, Spartz initially opposed the Republican Party's budget resolution that would balloon the deficit by trillions of dollars. She switched her position on the budget resolution, coming out in favor of it, after President Trump reportedly pressured her.

=== Agricultural commodity checkoff programs ===
In 2023, Spartz introduced a bill to prohibit federal funds from the 2024 Agriculture bill from being used by commodity checkoff programs. The checkoff program supports organizations tasked with research and promotion of specific agricultural commodities in the United States, paid for by an assessment on the producers. Several agricultural industry groups objected, calling the amendment "frivolous" because federal funds are not used for the checkoff programs. Spartz also indicated she would support the Opportunities for Fairness in Farming (OFF) Act, which is intended to introduce more oversight to the checkoff programs and prohibit utilizing checkoff funds for lobbying.

=== Support for Israel ===
Spartz visited Israel with a bipartisan delegation from congress in September 2023 "to discuss strengthening United States-Israel cooperation". In October 2023, Spartz released a statement urging the US to support Israel following the 2023 Hamas attacks.

== Personal life ==
While Spartz was in college, she met her future husband, Jason Spartz, on a train from Moscow to Kyiv. They married in 2000. They have two daughters and live in Noblesville, Indiana. Spartz is Eastern Orthodox.

== Electoral history ==
=== 2020 ===
After incumbent Republican Susan Brooks announced in June 2019 that she would not seek reelection, Spartz announced her candidacy for Indiana's 5th congressional district. She won the Republican primary on June 2, 2020. The Cook Political Report rated the race a toss-up.

Spartz won the November general election, defeating former state representative Christina Hale, the Democratic nominee, by four percent. This was the closest race in the district since it was reconfigured as a northern suburban district in 1983 (it had been numbered the 6th until 2003), and only the second time in that period that a Democrat had received at least 40% of the vote. Spartz prevailed by winning her home county of Hamilton, the most populous county entirely within the district, by 20,100 votes, more than her district-wide margin of just under 17,000 votes. She ran just behind Trump, who won the district with 50.1% of the vote.

Indiana's 5th congressional district, 2020
| Party | Candidate | Votes | % |
|---|---|---|---|
| Republican | Victoria Spartz | 208,212 | 50.0 |
| Democratic | Christina Hale | 191,226 | 45.9 |
| Libertarian | Ken Tucker | 16,788 | 4.0 |
| Total votes | | 416,226 | 100.0 |
| Republican hold | | | |

=== 2022 ===
The 2021 Indiana redistricting rendered the 5th significantly more Republican than its predecessor. Notably, the district lost its share of Indianapolis. To make up for the loss in population, the 5th was pushed to the east to take in Muncie and Anderson, previously in the 6th district.

After running unopposed in the primary, Spartz defeated Democratic nominee Jeanine Lee Lake in the general election.

2022 Indiana's 5th congressional district election
| Party | Candidate | Votes | % |
|---|---|---|---|
| Republican | Victoria Spartz (incumbent) | 146,575 | 61.1 |
| Democratic | Jeanine Lee Lake | 93,434 | 38.9 |
| Total votes | | 240,009 | 100 |
| Republican hold | | | |

=== 2024 ===
In late 2022, after Senator Mike Braun declared his candidacy for Governor of Indiana, there were rumors that Spartz might run for the U.S. Senate to replace him. However, on February 3, 2023, she announced that she would not run for reelection or for any other office in 2024. In early December 2023 she walked back her retirement announcement, writing in an email to IndyStar that "colleagues and constituents want me to run again" and there is "a better Speaker" leading the House, which would require her "to reconsider." She confirmed her intent to run for re-election on February 5, 2024, five days before the filing deadline.

She won the Republican primary on May 7, despite being outspent by her main challenger, Chuck Goodrich.

On July 1, 2024, the Metropolitan Washington Airports Authority announced that they had charged Spartz the previous Friday for a weapons violation at Dulles International Airport. She received a summons to appear before a court in Virginia. Spartz's office released the following statement: "Last Friday, Rep. Spartz accidentally carried an empty handgun in her suitcase with no magazine or bullets, which she did not realize was in the pocket of her suitcase, while going through security at Dulles airport. Rep. Spartz was issued a citation and proceeded on her international flight to the OSCE PA meeting in Europe." She later commented, "In reality, considering our line of business and how dangerous it is, we probably should be allowed to carry them anywhere".

2024 Indiana's 5th congressional district election
| Party | Candidate | Votes | % |
|---|---|---|---|
| Republican | Victoria Spartz (incumbent) | 203,293 | 56.6 |
| Democratic | Deborah Pickett | 136,554 | 38.0 |
| Independent | Robby Slaughter | 9,790 | 2.7 |
| Libertarian | Lauri Shillings | 9,567 | 2.7 |
| Total votes | | 359,204 | 100.0 |

=== 2026 ===
Spartz defeated Scott King in the May 5, 2026, Republican primary election. She faced Democratic state senator J. D. Ford in the general election, and was defeated on November 3, 2026.

Spartz lost in large part due to losing Hamilton County, which she had represented for a decade at the state and federal levels. Ford took 55 percent of the county's vote. Spartz said her loss was "a wake-up call for Indiana," since the once heavily Republican county had been swamped by "an influx of liberal voters."

== Notes ==
U.S. House of Representatives
| Preceded by Susan Brooks | Member of the U.S. House of Representatives from Indiana's 5th congressional district 2021–present | Incumbent |
U.S. order of precedence (ceremonial)
| Preceded by Maria Elvira Salazar | United States representatives by seniority 275th | Succeeded by Marilyn Strickland |
