= Indiana AFL–CIO =

State affiliate of trade union federation

- Indiana American Federation of Labor and Congress of Industrial Organizations
- Headquarters: West Building, 2917 Roosevelt Ave, Indianapolis, IN 46218
- Location: United States
- Members: ~300,000 (2021)^{[1]}
- Key people: Brett Voorhies, President
- Affiliations: AFL–CIO
- Website: https://www.inaflcio.org
- ^{1} Per official website above.

The Indiana AFL–CIO is the Indiana state affiliate of the American Federation of Labor and Congress of Industrial Organizations (AFL–CIO), the largest national trade union center in the United States. It was established by a merger between the state affiliates of American Federation of Labor and the Congress of Industrial Organizations in 1955. The roughly 400 local affiliates collectively represent approximately 300,000 active and retired workers.

== History ==
A notable precursor to the Indiana AFL–CIO was the Indiana Federation of Labor. The organization was founded on September 9, 1885; 140 years ago as the Indiana Federation of Trade and Labour Unions and was, at a point, the oldest operation state federation of labor. In 1897 the organization change its name to the Indiana State Federation of Labor. The federation was initially founded by members of the Knights of Labor, Moulders Union, Cigar Makers' Union, and the Typographical Union. The creation of the American Federation of Labor in 1886, a year after the Indiana Federation, is argued to have been inspired by the Indiana Federation.

== Presidents ==
=== Indiana Federation of Labor ===
- Samuel Leffingwell (1885–1887)
- Emil Levy (1887–1891)
- Thomas M. Gruelle (1891–1893)
- Joseph F. Suchawk (1893–1895)
- Edgar A. Perkins (1895–1909)
- John Hughes (1909–1910)
- Edgar A. Perkins (1910–1913)
- Charles Fox (1913–1921)

== Area Labor Federations ==
- Hoosier Heartland Area Labor Federation – (based in Indianapolis, Indiana)
- Northern Indiana Area Labor Federation – (based in Merrillville, Indiana)
- Southern Indiana Area Labor Federation – (based in Bloomington, Indiana)

== Affiliated unions ==
- American Federation of Government Employees (AFGE)
- American Federation of Musicians (AFM)
- American Federation of State, County and Municipal Employees (AFSCME)
- American Federation of Teachers (AFT)
- American Postal Workers Union (APWU)
- Amalgamated Transit Union (ATU)
- International Association of Heat and Frost Insulators and Allied Workers (HFIAW)
- International Union of Bricklayers and Allied Craftworkers (BAC)
- Communications Workers of America (CWA)
- Glass, Molders, Pottery, Plastics and Allied Workers International Union (GMP)
- International Association of Bridge, Structural, Ornamental and Reinforcing Iron Workers (Ironworkers)
- International Association of Fire Fighters (IAFF)
- International Association of Machinists and Aerospace Workers (IAM)
- International Alliance of Theatrical Stage Employees (IATSE)
- International Brotherhood of Boilermakers (IBB)
- International Brotherhood of Electrical Workers (IBEW)
- International Union of Operating Engineers (IUOE)
- International Union of Painters and Allied Trades (IUPAT)
- Laborers' International Union of North America (LIUNA)
- National Association of Letter Carriers (NALC)
- National Air Traffic Controllers Association (NATCA)
- Operative Plasterers' and Cement Masons' International Association (OPCMIA)
- Office and Professional Employees International Union (OPEIU)
- International Association of Sheet Metal, Air, Rail and Transportation Workers (SMART)
- United Association (UA)
- United Auto Workers (UAW)
- United Food and Commercial Workers (UFCW)
- United Farm Workers (UFW)
- Union of Needletrades, Industrial and Textile Employees (UNITE HERE)
- United Steelworkers (USW)
- United Union of Roofers, Waterproofers and Allied Workers (RWAW)
- Utility Workers Union of America (UWUA)
- United Mine Workers of America (UMWA)
