= Robert Weil (editor) =

Robert Weil is an Executive Editor and Vice President of the publishing imprint W. W. Norton / Liveright. From 2011 to 2022 he was the Editor-in-Chief and Publishing Director of Liveright, succeeded by Peter J. Simon in July, 2022. He is the editor of four Pulitzer Prize winning books.

== Early life and career ==
Weil graduated from Yale College with a Bachelor of Arts in History in 1977. He originally considered teaching high school before beginning his publishing career with Times Books in 1978 as an Editorial Assistant. In 1980 he moved to the former Omni Magazine. At Omni he introduced a book division, packaging and agenting science books to publishers before becoming Senior Editor at St. Martin's Press in 1988, a division of Macmillan Publishers. Weil's acquisitions at St. Martin's included Michael Wallis's Route 66, Henry Roth's tetralogy of novels called The Mercy of a Rude Stream, Oliver Stone's autobiographical novel A Child's Night Dream, and John Bayley's Elegy for Iris.

== W.W. Norton & Company / Liveright Publishing ==
In 1998, Weil moved to W.W. Norton & Company as an Executive Editor. His acquisition of most of the Patricia Highsmith backlist, which included several new volumes, in 1999, helped launch the Highsmith renaissance in the U.S. and the 2015 film Carol starring Cate Blanchett and Rooney Mara, based on the novel The Price of Salt, as well as Highsmith's diaries, published in 2021. Weil also worked for several years with Paul McCartney (and Paul Muldoon) on the editing of McCartney's book The Lyrics: 1956 to the Present, published in 2021.

In 2011, Weil was named the Editor-in-Chief and Publishing Director of Liveright Publishing Corporation. Per a 2021 profile in Publishers Weekly, "The relaunched imprint released its first books in 2012. It started with two full-time staffers and a list of about 20 books per year, and has grown to eight staffers and about 40 books annually." During Weil's tenure as Editor-in-Chief, Liveright received four Pulitzer Prizes (among nine finalists) as well as a National Book Award (among eight nominees). The current staff of Liveright includes Peter J. Simon, Peter Miller, Gina Iaquinta, Maria Goldverg, Nick Curley, Clio Hamilton, Maria Connors, Luke Swann, and Kevin Xue.

== Additional work ==
Beyond editing, Weil frequently lectures on writing, publishing history, and the state of American culture and literature. He has spoken in Munich, Guadalajara, Miami, Chicago, and at Yale University, Vanderbilt University, and the University of Nebraska, among others. He has also written on books and publishing for various publications including The Washington Post and ArtForum.

== Selected authors edited by Robert Weil ==
- Edward Abbey
- Danielle Allen
- Anthony Appiah
- Simon Armitage
- António Lobo Antunes
- John Ashbery
- Isaac Babel
- J. G. Ballard
- William Barber II
- John Bayley
- Mary Beard
- Heinrich Böll
- Max Boot
- Patricia Bosworth
- T. C. Boyle
- Pete Buttigieg
- Jerome Charyn
- Erwin Chemerinsky
- J. M. Coetzee
- Linda Colley
- Francis Ford Coppola
- Robert Crumb
- Aline Kominsky-Crumb
- Jack E. Davis
- Patti Davis
- Freeman Dyson
- Joseph J. Ellis
- Will Eisner
- Jules Feiffer
- Lawrence Ferlinghetti
- Ruth Franklin
- Howard W. French
- Martin Gardner
- Henry Louis Gates Jr.
- Peter Gay
- William Giraldi
- Philip Glass
- Nadine Gordimer
- Annette Gordon-Reed
- Michael Gorra
- Allan Gurganus
- Yunte Huang
- Patricia Highsmith
- Jim Holt
- Clive James
- George F. Kennan
- Leslie S. Klinger
- Michael Korda
- Nicholas Lemann
- Jill Lepore
- Primo Levi
- David Levering Lewis
- Nelson Mandela
- Wilma Mankiller
- Russell Means
- Paul McCartney
- Larry McMurtry
- Alan Mikhail
- N. Scott Momaday
- Alan Moore
- Edmund Morgan (historian)
- Jan Morris
- Benjamin Moser
- Paul Muldoon
- Charles Ogletree
- Les Payne
- Tamara Payne
- Leonard Peltier
- James Poniewozik
- Henry Roth
- Joseph Roth
- Richard Rothstein
- Amartya Sen
- Roger Shattuck
- Peter Singer
- Edward Sorel
- David Small
- Gerry Spence
- Claude Steele
- Oliver Stone
- Maria Tatar
- Marilyn vos Savant
- Edward O. Wilson
- Frank B. Wilderson III

== Selected works edited by Robert Weil ==
Year	Title	Author	Accolades
1996	From Bondage (Mercy of a Rude Stream, Vol. 3)	Henry Roth	Finalist for the National Book Critics Circle Award for Fiction
1997	The Smell of Apples: A Novel	Mark Behr	Los Angeles Times Book Prize for First Fiction
1998	All on Fire: William Lloyd Garrison and the Abolition of Slavery	Henry Mayer	Finalist for the National Book Award for Nonfiction
1999	The Hairstons: An American Family in Black and White	Henry Wiencek	National Book Critics Circle Award for Biography
1999	Elegy for Iris	John Bayley	New York Times Bestseller; Basis for Iris (2001 film)
2000	Darkness in El Dorado: How Scientists and Journalists Devastated the Amazon	Patrick Tierney	Finalist for the National Book Award for Nonfiction
2003	Nelson Mandela's Favorite African Folktales	Nelson Mandela (Editor)	NAACP Image Award for Outstanding Literary Work for Children
2005	Perilous Times: Free Speech in Wartime from the Sedition Act of 1798 to the War on Terrorism	Geoffrey R. Stone	Los Angeles Times Book Prize for History
2008	The Hemingses of Monticello: An American Family	Annette Gordon-Reed	Pulitzer Prize for History; National Book Award for Nonfiction; Finalist for the National Book Critics Circle Award for Biography
2008	The Anglo Files: A Field Guide to the British	Sarah Lyall	New York Times Bestseller
2009	Stitches: A Memoir	David Small	Finalist for the National Book Award for Young People's Literature; New York Times Bestseller
2009	The Book of Genesis	Robert Crumb	New York Times Bestseller
2009	Dancing in the Dark: A Cultural History of the Great Depression	Morris Dickstein	Finalist for the National Book Critics Circle Award for Criticism
2010	Dorothea Lange: A Life Beyond Limits	Linda Gordon	Los Angeles Times Book Prize for History; The Bancroft Prize
2010	Charlie Chan: The Untold Story of the Honorable Detective and His Rendezvous with American History	Yunte Huang	Finalist for the National Book Critics Circle Award (Biography); Edgar Award (Critical/Biographical); California Book Award (Nonfiction)
2012	Portrait of a Novel: Henry James and the Making of an American Masterpiece	Michael Gorra	Finalist for the Pulitzer Prize for Biography; Finalist for the National Book Critics Circle Award for Biography
2012	The Social Conquest of Earth	Edward O. Wilson	New York Times Bestseller; New York Times Notable Book; Longlisted for the Andrew Carnegie Medals for Excellence in Fiction and Nonfiction
2012	Why Does the World Exist?: An Existential Detective Story	Jim Holt	New York Times Bestseller; Finalist for the National Book Critics Circle Award for Nonfiction
2013	Confronting the Classics: Traditions, Adventures, and Innovations	Mary Beard	Finalist for the National Book Critics Circle Award for Criticism
2013	Invisible Armies: An Epic History of Guerrilla Warfare from Ancient Times to the Present	Max Boot	New York Times Bestseller
2013	Karl Marx: A Nineteenth-Century Life	Jonathan Sperber	Finalist for the Pulitzer Prize for Biography
2013	Letters to a Young Scientist	Edward O. Wilson	New York Times Bestseller
2014	Blood Will Out: The True Story of a Murder, a Mystery, and a Masquerade	Walter Kirn	New York Times Bestseller
2014	The Last Kind Words Saloon: A Novel	Larry McMurtry	New York Times Bestseller
2014	The Meaning of Human Existence	Edward O. Wilson	New York Times Bestseller; Finalist for the National Book Award for Nonfiction
2014	Fear Itself: The New Deal and the Origins of Our Time	Ira Katznelson	The Bancroft Prize
2015	The Complete Works of Primo Levi	Primo Levi, translated by Ann Goldstein	New York Times Notable Book
2015	SPQR: A History of Ancient Rome	Mary Beard	New York Times Bestseller; Finalist for the National Book Critics Circle Award for Nonfiction
2015	Words Without Music: A Memoir	Philip Glass	New York Times Bestseller
2016	Cousin Joseph: A Graphic Novel	Jules Feiffer	New York Times Bestseller
2016	’’Most Blessed of the Patriarchs’’: Thomas Jefferson and the Empire of the Imagination	Annette Gordon-Reed and Peter S. Onuf	New York Times Bestseller
2016	New England Bound: Slavery and Colonization in Early America	Wendy Warren	Finalist for the Pulitzer Prize for History; New York Times Notable Book
2016	Shirley Jackson: A Rather Haunted Life	Ruth Franklin	National Book Critics Circle Award for Autobiography; Edgar Award (Critical/Biographical); Bram Stoker Award for Best Non-Fiction; New York Times Notable Book
2016	Jerusalem	Alan Moore	New York Times Bestseller
2017	The Annotated African American Folktales	Henry Louis Gates Jr. and Maria Tatar	NAACP Image Award for Outstanding Literary Work – Fiction
2017	The Color of Law: A Forgotten History of How Our Government Segregated America	Richard Rothstein	Longlisted for the National Book Award for Nonfiction; New York Times Bestseller; New York Times Notable Book; Winner of the Hillman Prize
2017	The Gulf: The Making of An American Sea	Jack E. Davis	Pulitzer Prize for History; Kirkus Prize for Nonfiction; Finalist for the National Book Critics Circle Award for Nonfiction; New York Times Notable Book
2018	The Road Not Taken: Edward Lansdale and the American Tragedy in Vietnam	Max Boot	Finalist for the Pulitzer Prize for Biography or Autobiography
2018	These Truths: A History of the United States	Jill Lepore	New York Times Bestseller
2018	We the Corporations: How American Businesses Won Their Civil Rights	Adam Winkler	Shortlisted for the National Book Award for Nonfiction; Finalist for the National Book Critics Circle Award for Nonfiction; New York Times Notable Book
2018	The Prison Letters of Nelson Mandela	Nelson Mandela	NPR Best Books of 2018
2019	Audience of One: Trump, Television, and the Fracturing of America	James Poniewozik	New York Times Notable Book
2019	Inseparable: The Original Siamese Twins and Their Rendezvous with American History	Yunte Huang	Finalist for the National Book Critics Circle Award for Biography
2019	Shortest Way Home: One Mayor's Challenge and a Model for America's Future	Pete Buttigieg	New York Times Bestseller
2020	Afropessimism	Frank B. Wilderson III	Longlisted for the National Book Award for Nonfiction
2020	The Dead Are Arising: The Life of Malcolm X	Les Payne and Tamara Payne	National Book Award for Nonfiction; Pulitzer Prize for Biography; New York Times Notable Book
2020	If Then: How the Simulmatics Corporation Invented the Future	Jill Lepore	Longlisted for the National Book Award for Nonfiction
2020	The Saddest Words: William Faulkner's Civil War	Michael Gorra	New York Times Notable Book
2020	Trust: America's Best Chance	Pete Buttigieg	New York Times Bestseller
2021	On Juneteenth	Annette Gordon-Reed	New York Times Bestseller; New York Times 10 Best Books of the Year; New York Times Critics Best Books of 2021
2021	Pessoa: A Biography	Richard Zenith	New York Times Critics Best Books of 2021; Finalist for the Pulitzer Prize for Biography or Autobiography
2021	The Lyrics: 1956 to the Present	Paul McCartney	New York Times Bestseller; Barnes & Noble Book of the Year
2023	1964: Eyes of the Storm	Paul McCartney	New York Times Bestseller
2023	Emperor of Rome: Ruling the Ancient Roman World	Mary Beard	New York Times Bestseller
2023	Daughter of the Dragon: Anna May Wong's Rendezvous with American History	Yunte Huang	New York Times Notable Book; Finalist for the National Book Critics Circle Award for Biography
2024	Reagan: His Life and Legend	Max Boot	New York Times 10 Best Books of the Year; New York Times Bestseller
2025	We the People: A History of the U.S. Constitution	Jill Lepore	Pulitzer Prize for History; New York Times Bestseller
2025	Wings: The Story of a Band on the Run	Paul McCartney	New York Times Bestseller
