= Joseph Buttigieg =

Maltese-American literary scholar and translator (1947–2019)

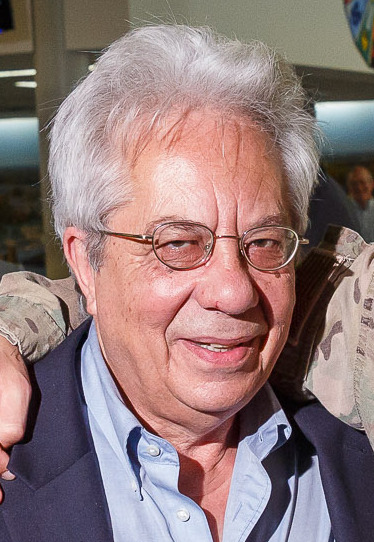
- Buttigieg in 2014
- Born: Joseph Anthony Buttiġieġ II; May 20, 1947; Hamrun, Crown Colony of Malta
- Died: January 27, 2019 (aged 71); South Bend, Indiana, U.S.
- Occupations: Scholar, academic, translator
- Spouses: Jennifer Anne Montgomery (m. 1980)
- Children: Pete Buttigieg
- Relatives: Chasten Buttigieg (son-in-law)

Academic background
- Education: University of Malta (BA, MA); Heythrop College, University of London (BPhil); Binghamton University (PhD)
- Thesis: Contexts for A Portrait of the Artist as a Young Man (1976)
- Doctoral advisor: Zack Bowen; William B. Stein; Robert Kroetsch

Academic work
- Discipline: English
- Institutions: New Mexico State University; University of Notre Dame

Joseph Anthony Buttigieg II (/ˈbuːtɪdʒədʒ/ BOO-tij-əj; (Note: Sometimes pronounced with a strong vowel as /-ɛdʒ/ -ej, as reflected in his son Pete Buttigieg's Twitter re-spelling of "boot-edge-edge", or possibly /-ɪdʒ/ -ij to approximate Maltese.) Maltese: Buttiġieġ [bʊtːɪˈd͡ʒɪːt͡ʃ]; May 20, 1947 – January 27, 2019) was a Maltese-American literary scholar and translator. He served as William R. Kenan Jr. Professor of English at the University of Notre Dame until his retirement in 2017. Buttigieg co-translated and co-edited the three-volume English edition of Antonio Gramsci's Prison Notebooks.

== Early life and education ==
Buttigieg was the eldest of eight children born to Joseph Anthony and Maria Concetta Buttigieg (née Portelli) in Hamrun, Malta. He began his education in Hamrun, completing undergraduate work and a master's degree at the University of Malta. He earned a taught postgraduate degree, a B.Phil., from Heythrop College of the University of London and a Ph.D. in English (1976; with a dissertation on aesthetics in James Joyce's A Portrait of the Artist as a Young Man) from Binghamton University. He was naturalized as a U.S. citizen in 1979.

== Career and personal life ==
Buttigieg taught at New Mexico State University at Las Cruces starting in 1976 and there met Jennifer Anne Montgomery, also a new faculty member. In 1980, they married and also joined the faculty of Notre Dame.

Their son, Pete Buttigieg, was elected as mayor of South Bend, Indiana in 2011, ran for the Democratic nomination as presidential candidate in the 2020 election, and became the Secretary of Transportation under the Biden administration. Pete said in his first book, Shortest Way Home, that his father was called racial slurs, even though he was European, because of his darker skin.

Buttigieg specialized in modern European literature and theory. He was translator and editor of the three-volume English edition of Marxist philosopher and politician Antonio Gramsci's Prison Notebooks, published from 1992 to 2007 with support from the National Endowment for the Humanities. He was a founding member and president of the International Gramsci Society, founded to facilitate communication among those who study Gramsci. Buttigieg also served as chair of the English Department at Notre Dame and was promoted to William R. Kenan Jr. Professor of English. He took emeritus status upon retiring in 2017. He died on January 27, 2019.

== Bibliography ==
- Criticism Without Boundaries: Directions and Crosscurrents in Postmodern Critical Theory (University of Notre Dame Press, 1987).
- A Portrait of the Artist in Different Perspective (Ohio University Press, 1987).
- ed. with Carmel Borg and Peter Mayo, Gramsci and Education (Rowman & Littlefield, 2002).
- ed. with Thomas Kselman, European Christian Democracy: Historical Legacies and Comparative Perspectives (University of Notre Dame Press, 2003).
- ed. and trans. Prison Notebooks (vols. 1–3) by Antonio Gramsci (Columbia University Press, 1992–2007).
- ed. and trans. with Marcus E. Green, Subaltern Social Groups: A Critical Edition of Prison Notebooks 25 by Antonio Gramsci (Columbia University Press, 2021).
