= Shortest Way Home =

2019 autobiography by Pete Buttigieg

Shortest Way Home: One Mayor's Challenge and a Model for America's Future
- First edition cover
- Author: Pete Buttigieg
- Audio read by: Pete Buttigieg
- Language: English
- Genre: Autobiography
- Publisher: Liveright
- Publication date: 12 February 2019
- Publication place: United States
- Media type: Print (hardcover)
- Pages: 352
- ISBN: 978-1-63149-436-9
- Dewey Decimal: 977.2/89044092 B
- LC Class: F534.S7 B87 2019

Shortest Way Home: One Mayor's Challenge and a Model for America's Future is an autobiography by Pete Buttigieg, the Mayor of South Bend, Indiana from 2012 to 2020. The book was first published by Liveright Publishing in 2019.

On July 8, 2020, Buttigieg announced the release of his next book, entitled Trust: America's Best Chance, a study of accountability, breakdowns in national confidence, and means of confronting the coming decade's challenges.

== Summary ==
Shortest Way Home describes the life of Pete Buttigieg, his path to becoming the mayor of his hometown, South Bend, Indiana, and the actions and decisions he has made during his time in office. South Bend is portrayed as a city which had experienced its peak when manufacturers such as Studebaker and South Bend Watch Company were based in it. Buttigieg notes how these companies had failed to embrace changes which could have helped them survive; for example, the South Bend Watch Company continued to produce pocket watches for over a decade after wristwatches had become the dominant style. As a result, following the closing of the Studebaker plant in the early 1960s the city had begun a long decline, resulting in a shrinking population and decline in the number of younger residents. Notably, South Bend was included in a 2011 Newsweek list of American dying cities.

== Reception ==
The book has been reviewed in publications including The New York Times, The Guardian, The Washington Post, Kirkus Reviews, Publishers Weekly, and Current Affairs.
