= Pete Buttigieg =

American politician (born 1982)

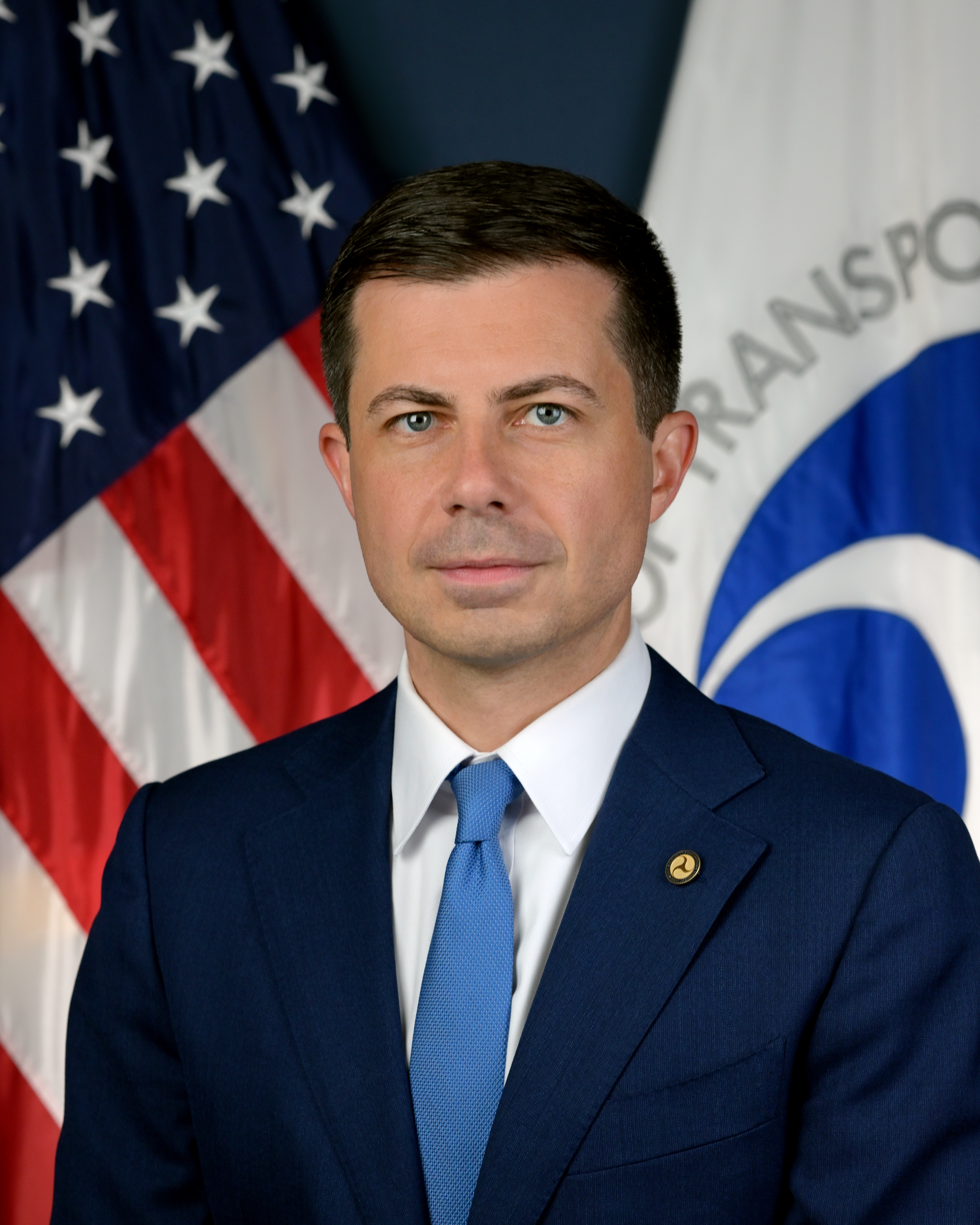
- Official portrait, 2022

19th United States Secretary of Transportation
- In office February 3, 2021 – January 20, 2025
- President: Joe Biden
- Deputy: Polly Trottenberg
- Preceded by: Elaine Chao
- Succeeded by: Sean Duffy

32nd Mayor of South Bend
- In office January 1, 2012 – January 1, 2020
- Preceded by: Steve Luecke
- Succeeded by: James Mueller

Personal details
- Born: Peter Paul Montgomery Buttigieg; January 19, 1982 (age 44) South Bend, Indiana, U.S.
- Party: Democratic
- Spouse: Chasten Glezman (m. 2018)
- Children: 2
- Parent: Joseph Buttigieg (father)
- Education: Harvard University (BA); Pembroke College, Oxford (BA)
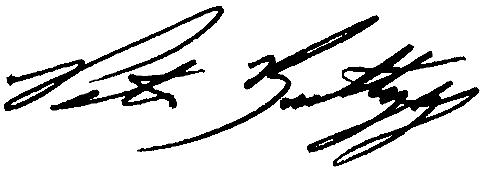
- Signature

Military service
- Branch: United States Navy; U.S. Navy Reserve
- Service years: 2009–2017
- Rank: Lieutenant
- Unit: Naval Intelligence
- Battles/wars: War in Afghanistan
- Awards: Joint Service Commendation Medal
- Buttigieg's voice Buttigieg's opening statement on his nomination for U.S. Secretary of Transportation; Recorded January 21, 2021

Peter Paul Montgomery Buttigieg (/ˈbuːtɪdʒədʒ/ BOO-tij-əj; (Note: Sometimes pronounced with a strong vowel as /-ɛdʒ/ -ej, as reflected in his Twitter re-spelling, "boot-edge-edge.") born January 19, 1982) is an American politician and former naval officer who served as the 19th United States secretary of transportation from 2021 to 2025. A member of the Democratic Party, he previously served as the 32nd mayor of South Bend, Indiana, from 2012 to 2020.

Buttigieg is a graduate of Harvard College and the University of Oxford, attending the latter on a Rhodes Scholarship. In 2007, he began three years of work at the management consulting firm McKinsey & Company. From 2009 to 2017, he was an intelligence officer in the United States Navy Reserve, attaining the rank of lieutenant. He was mobilized and deployed to the war in Afghanistan for seven months in 2014. Afterwards, he worked on the political campaigns of Democrats Jill Long Thompson, Joe Donnelly, and John Kerry, and was the unsuccessful Democratic nominee for Indiana state treasurer in 2010. In 2011, he was elected mayor of South Bend. In 2015, Buttigieg was re-elected, coming out as gay earlier that year. He married Chasten Glezman, a schoolteacher and writer, in June 2018. Buttigieg declined to seek a third term as mayor.

In April 2019, Buttigieg announced a 2020 presidential campaign, making him the first openly gay man to launch a Democratic presidential campaign. (Note: Prior to Buttigieg's 2020 presidential candidacy, Fred Karger, who is also openly gay, sought the Republican Party nomination in 2012.) During the Democratic Party primaries, he gained significant momentum in mid-2019 after several town hall meetings and television debates. Buttigieg narrowly won the Iowa caucuses while placing second in the popular vote, and placed a close second in the New Hampshire primary. By winning Iowa, he became the first openly gay candidate to win a presidential primary or caucus. Buttigieg dropped out of the race on March 1, 2020, and endorsed Joe Biden the following day.

After Biden won the 2020 presidential election, he named Buttigieg as his nominee for secretary of transportation in December 2020. His nomination was confirmed on February 2, 2021, by a vote of 86–13, making him the first openly gay Cabinet secretary in U.S. history. (Note: Richard Grenell, who is also gay, was appointed acting director of national intelligence by President Donald Trump in 2020; however, the Director of National Intelligence is not a Cabinet secretary, but rather a Cabinet-level official and was not confirmed by the Senate. For more information, see Cabinet of the United States and United States presidential line of succession.) Nominated at age 38, he was also the youngest Cabinet member in the Biden administration and the youngest person ever to serve as secretary of transportation. After Biden withdrew his re-election campaign in 2024, Buttigieg was considered as a potential running mate for Kamala Harris, though he was ultimately not selected.

== Early life and career ==
Pete Buttigieg was born on January 19, 1982, in South Bend, Indiana, to Jennifer "Anne" Montgomery and Joseph Anthony Buttigieg II. He is an only child. His parents met and married while employed as faculty at New Mexico State University. His father was born in Ħamrun, Malta, and emigrated to the United States to pursue his doctorate. Buttigieg's father embarked on a career as a professor of English at the University of Notre Dame near South Bend. Buttigieg's mother also taught at the University of Notre Dame for 29 years. His father is a translator of Italian Marxist philosopher Antonio Gramsci's Prison Notebooks and the editor of a three-volume English edition; he influenced his son's decision to study literature in college.

=== Education ===
Buttigieg was valedictorian of the class of 2000 at St. Joseph High School in South Bend. That year, he won first prize in the John F. Kennedy Presidential Library and Museum's Profiles in Courage essay contest. He traveled to Boston where he accepted the award and met Caroline Kennedy and other members of the Kennedy family. The subject of his essay was the integrity and political courage of then U.S. representative Bernie Sanders of Vermont, one of only two independent politicians in Congress. (Note: When Buttigieg wrote his Profiles in Courage essay in 2000, Virgil Goode was also an independent politician in the U.S. House of Representatives.)

In 2000, Buttigieg was one of two students chosen to be a delegate from Indiana to the United States Senate Youth Program, an annual scholarship competition sponsored jointly by the U.S. Senate and the Hearst Foundations. In his last high-school year, Buttigieg was named the school valedictorian, voted senior class president and chosen Most Likely to be U.S. President.

After graduating from high school, Buttigieg attended Harvard College, where he majored in history and literature. He became president of the Student Advisory Committee of the Harvard Institute of Politics and worked on the institute's annual study of youth attitudes on politics. His undergraduate thesis, The Quiet American's Errand into the Wilderness, examined the influence of Puritanism on U.S. foreign policy as reflected in Graham Greene's novel The Quiet American. He graduated magna cum laude from Harvard in 2004, and was elected a member of Phi Beta Kappa.

Buttigieg was awarded a Rhodes Scholarship to study at the University of Oxford. In 2007, he received a Bachelor of Arts degree with first-class honours in philosophy, politics, and economics after studying at Pembroke College, Oxford. At Oxford, he was an editor of the Oxford International Review, and was a co-founder and member of the Democratic Renaissance Project, an informal debate and discussion group of approximately a dozen Oxford students.

=== Professional career ===
Before graduating from college, Buttigieg was an investigative intern at WMAQ-TV, Chicago's NBC News affiliate. He also interned for Democrat Jill Long Thompson during her unsuccessful 2002 congressional bid.

After college, Buttigieg worked on John Kerry's 2004 presidential campaign as a policy and research specialist for several months in Arizona and New Mexico. From 2004 to 2005, Buttigieg was conference director of the Cohen Group. In 2006, he lent assistance to Joe Donnelly's successful congressional campaign.

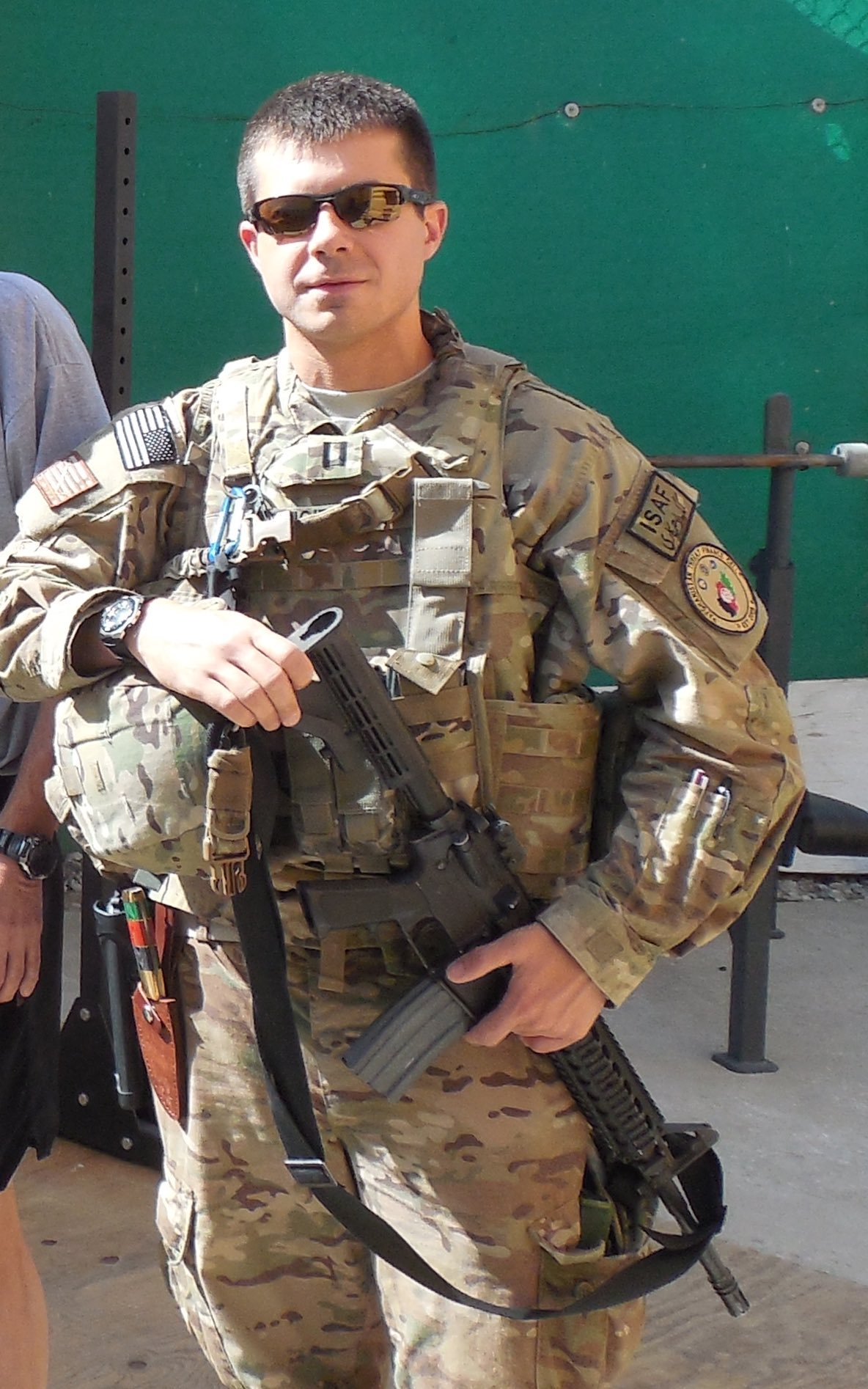
Buttigieg in 2014 during his service in Afghanistan

After earning his Oxford degree, in 2007, Buttigieg became a consultant at the Chicago office of McKinsey & Company, where he worked on energy, retail, economic development, and logistics for three years. His clients at McKinsey included the health insurer Blue Cross Blue Shield of Michigan; electronics retailer Best Buy; Canadian supermarket chain Loblaws; two nonprofit environmentalist groups, the Natural Resources Defense Council and Energy Foundation; and several U.S. government agencies, the Environmental Protection Agency (EPA), Energy Department, Defense Department, and Postal Service. He took a leave of absence from McKinsey in 2008 to become research director for Jill Long Thompson's unsuccessful campaign for Indiana governor. His work at McKinsey included trips to Iraq and Afghanistan, which he rarely discusses. Buttigieg left McKinsey in 2010 in order to focus full-time on his campaign for Indiana state treasurer.

Buttigieg has been involved with the Truman National Security Project since 2005 and serves as a fellow with expertise in Afghanistan and Pakistan. He was named to the organization's board of advisors in 2014.

=== Military service ===
Buttigieg joined the U.S. Navy Reserve through the direct commission officer (DCO) program and was sworn in as an ensign in naval intelligence in September 2009. He took a seven-month leave during his mayoral term to deploy to Afghanistan in 2014. While there, Buttigieg was part of a unit assigned to identify and disrupt terrorist finance networks. Part of this was done at Bagram Air Base, but he was also an armed driver for his commander on more than 100 trips into Kabul, where he was tasked with watching out for ambushes and explosive devices along the roads and ensuring that the vehicle was guarded. Buttigieg has jokingly referred to this role as "military Uber". Also, while deployed in Afghanistan, Buttigieg was assigned to the Afghan Threat Finance Cell, a counterterrorism unit that targeted Taliban insurgency financing. Buttigieg was awarded the Joint Service Commendation Medal. He left the U.S. Navy Reserve in 2017.

=== Indiana state treasurer election ===
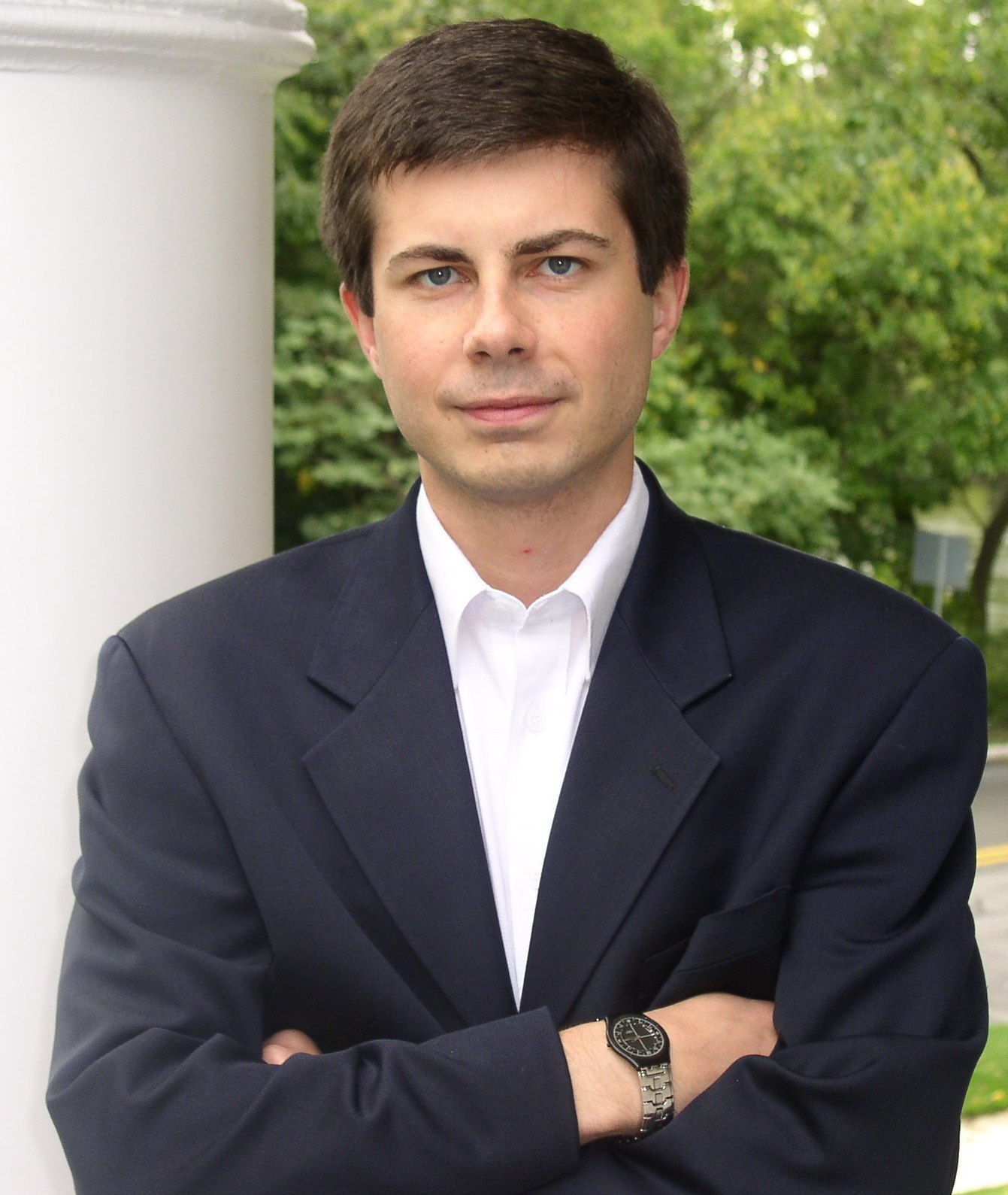
Buttigieg campaign photo for Indiana State Treasurer in March 2010

Buttigieg was the Democratic nominee for state treasurer of Indiana in 2010. He received 37.5 percent of the vote, losing to Republican incumbent Richard Mourdock. Much of Buttigieg's campaign had focused on criticizing Mourdock for investing state pension funds in Chrysler junk bonds, and for having subsequently filed a lawsuit against Chrysler's bankruptcy restructuring, which Buttigieg argued imperiled Chrysler jobs in the state of Indiana.

== Mayor of South Bend ==
=== First term ===
Buttigieg ran for the Democratic nomination for mayor of South Bend in 2011. In a PBS Michiana – WNIT broadcast, he expressed his desire to reinvigorate South Bend, especially with respect to job creation and education. Buttigieg campaigned on other issues, such as pursuing international investment, increasing presence of police and other safety professionals, and improving city services. Buttigieg won his primary election against four opponents on May 3, 2011, receiving 7,663 votes. Buttigieg was elected mayor of South Bend in the November 2011 general election with 10,991 of the 14,883 votes cast, or 74 percent of all votes. He defeated Republican nominee Norris W. Curry Jr. and Libertarian nominee Patrick M. Farrell. Buttigieg took office in January 2012 at the age of 29, becoming the second-youngest mayor in South Bend history (Note: Schuyler Colfax III had become mayor in 1898 at age 28.) and the youngest incumbent mayor, at the time, of a U.S. city with at least 100,000 residents.

After a federal investigation ruled that South Bend police had illegally recorded telephone calls of several officers, Buttigieg demoted police chief Darryl Boykins in 2012. (Note: Boykins had first been appointed in 2008 by Mayor Steve Luecke, and he was reappointed by Buttigieg earlier in 2012.) Buttigieg also dismissed the department's communications director, who had discovered the recordings but continued to record the line at Boykins's command. The police communications director alleged that the recordings captured four senior police officers making racist remarks and discussing illegal acts.

Buttigieg has written that his "first serious mistake as mayor" came shortly after taking office in 2012, when he decided to ask for Boykins's resignation. Backed by supporters and legal counsel, Boykins requested reinstatement. When Buttigieg denied his request, Boykins, as the city's first African American police chief, sued the city for racial discrimination, arguing that the taping policy had existed under previous police chiefs, who were white. Buttigieg settled the lawsuits brought by Boykins and the four officers out of court for over $800,000. A federal judge ruled in 2015 that Boykins's recordings violated the Federal Wiretap Act. Buttigieg came under pressure from political opponents to release the eight tapes, but he said that it was not possible to release seven of them, citing the Federal Wiretap Act. It was unclear if releasing the eighth tape would violate any laws. St. Joseph County Superior Court Judge Steve Hostetler heard a case for the release of five cassette tapes. Judge Hostetler ruled that the cassette tapes must be released to the South Bend City Council in May 2021.

As mayor, Buttigieg promoted a number of development and redevelopment projects. Buttigieg was a leading figure behind the creation of a nightly laser-light display along downtown South Bend's St. Joseph River trail as public art. The project cost $700,000, which was raised from private funds. The "River Lights" installation was unveiled in May 2015 as part of the city's 150th anniversary celebrations. He also oversaw the city's launching of a 3-1-1 system in 2013. Buttigieg's administration oversaw the sale of numerous city-owned properties. One of Buttigieg's signature programs was the "Vacant and Abandoned Properties Initiative". Known locally as 1,000 Properties in 1,000 Days, it was a project to repair or demolish blighted properties across South Bend. The program reached its goal two months before its scheduled end date in November 2015. By the thousandth day of the program, before Buttigieg's first term ended, nearly 40 percent of the targeted houses were repaired, and 679 were demolished or under contract for demolition. Buttigieg took note of the fact that many homes within communities of color were the ones demolished, leading to early distrust between the city and these communities.

While mayor, Buttigieg served for seven months in Afghanistan as a lieutenant in the U.S. Navy Reserve, returning to the United States on September 23, 2014. In his absence, Deputy Mayor Mark Neal, South Bend's city comptroller, served as executive from February 2014 until Buttigieg returned to his role as mayor in October 2014.

In 2015, during the controversy over Indiana Senate Bill 101 – the original version of which was widely criticized for allowing discrimination against lesbian, gay, bisexual, and transgender people – Buttigieg emerged as a leading opponent of the legislation. Amid his reelection campaign, he came out as gay and expressed his solidarity with the LGBTQ community.

=== Second term ===
Buttigieg announced in 2014 that he would seek a second term in 2015. He won the Democratic primary with approximately 78 percent of the vote, defeating Henry Davis Jr., the city councilman from the second district. In November 2015, he was elected to his second term as mayor with over 80 percent of the vote, defeating Republican Kelly Jones by a margin of 8,515 to 2,074 votes. After winning reelection, Buttigieg signed an executive order helping to establish a recognized city identification card in 2016.

To improve South Bend's downtown area, Buttigieg proposed a Smart Streets urban development program in 2013. In early 2015 – after traffic studies and public hearings – he secured a bond issue for the program backed by tax increment financing. Smart Streets was a complete streets implementation program aimed at improving economic development and urban vibrancy as well as road safety. Elements of the project were finished in 2016, and the project was officially completed in 2017. The project was credited with spurring private development in the city.

In a new phase of the Vacant and Abandoned Properties Initiative, South Bend partnered with the Notre Dame Clinical Law Center to provide free legal assistance to qualifying applicants wishing to acquire vacant lots and, with local nonprofits, to repair or construct homes and provide low-income home ownership assistance using South Bend Housing and Urban Development funds.

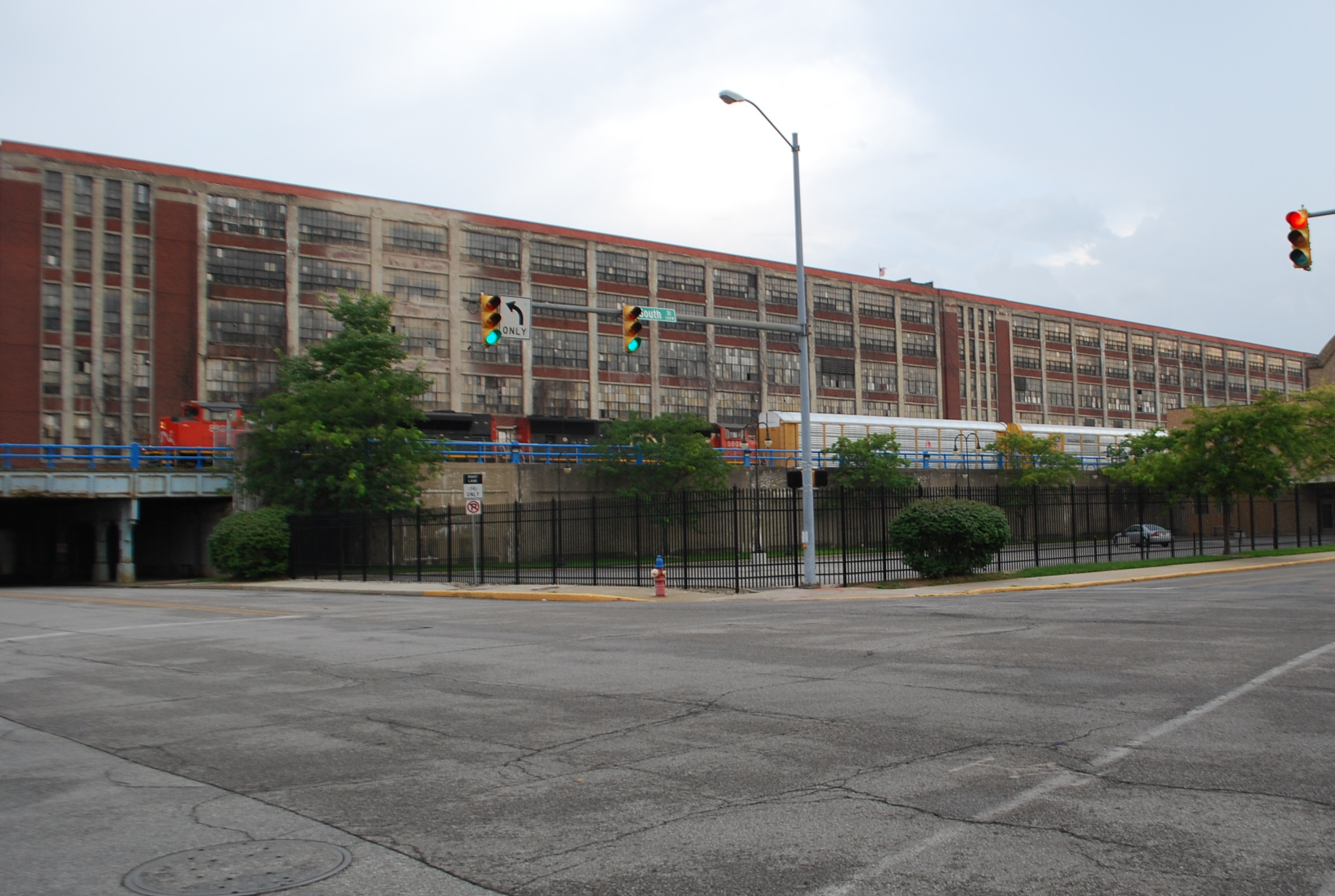
Studebaker Building 84 in 2014

The City of South Bend partnered with the State of Indiana and private developers to break ground on a $165-million renovation of the former Studebaker complex in 2016, hoping that the redevelopment would facilitate industrial and housing units. This development is in the Renaissance District which includes nearby Ignition Park. In 2017, it was announced that the long-abandoned Studebaker Building 84, also known as Ivy Tower, would have its exterior renovated with $3.5 million in Regional Cities funds from the State of Indiana and another $3.5 million from South Bend tax increment financing, with plans for the building and other structures in its complex to serve as a technology hub. The website Best Cities later ranked South Bend number 39 on its 2020 list of the 100 best small cities in the United States, citing Buttigieg's efforts to revitalize the Studebaker factory and Downtown South Bend.

Under Buttigieg, the city also began a smart sewer program, the first phase of which was finished in 2017 at a cost of $150 million. The effort used federal funds and by 2019 had reduced the combined sewer overflow by 75 percent. The impetus for the effort was a fine that the EPA had levied against the city in 2011 for Clean Water Act violations. In 2019, Buttigieg asked for the city to be released from an agreement with the EPA brokered under his mayoral predecessor Steve Luecke, in which South Bend had agreed to make hundreds of millions of dollars in further improvements to its sewer system by 2031.

The Common Council approved Buttigieg's request to enable his administration to develop a city climate plan in April 2019; Buttigieg signed a contract with the Chicago firm Delta Institute to help develop it. In late November 2019, the city's Common Council voted 7–0 to approve the resultant Carbon Neutral 2050 plan, setting the goal of meeting the Paris Agreement's 26-percent emission reduction by 2025, and aiming for a further reductions of 45 percent by 2035.

Supporting private development in South Bend was another initiative Buttigieg continued during his second term. By 2019, the city had seen $374 million in private investment for mixed-use developments since Buttigieg had taken office, by one estimate. By another account, Downtown South Bend saw roughly $200 million in private investment during Buttigieg's tenure.

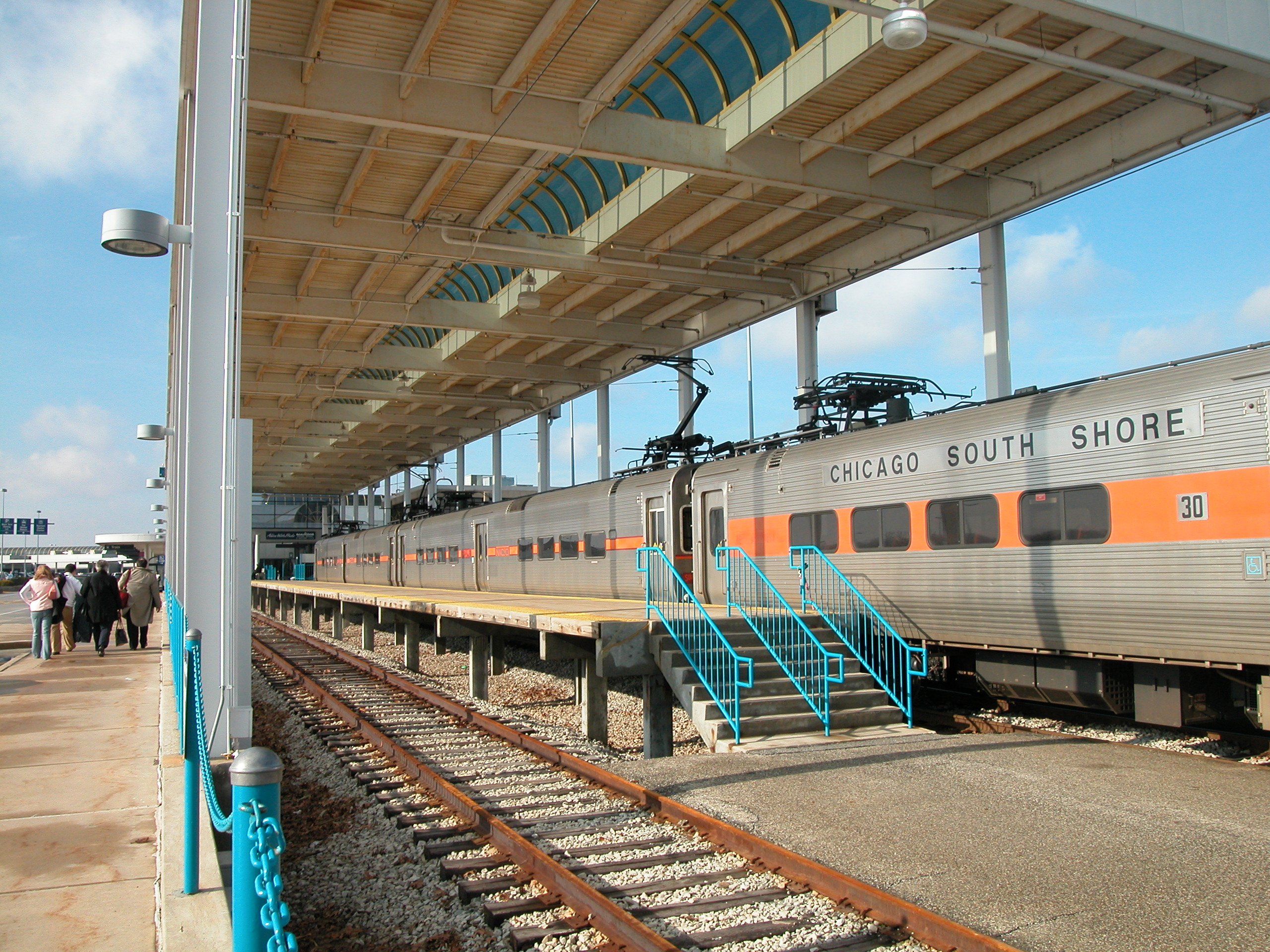
In 2018, Buttigieg proposed moving the city's South Shore Line station, from the airport to downtown.

With respect to infrastructure, Buttigieg promoted the idea of moving the city's South Shore Line station from South Bend International Airport to the city's downtown in August 2018. He made it a goal to have the city complete this project by 2025. Also, South Bend launched Commuters Trust, a new transportation benefit program created in collaboration with local employers and transportation providers, including South Bend Transpo and Lyft, in 2019. The program was made possible by a $1 million three-year grant from Bloomberg Philanthropies Mayors Challenge. Furthermore, under Buttigieg, South Bend invested $50 million in the city's parks, many of which had been neglected during the preceding decades.

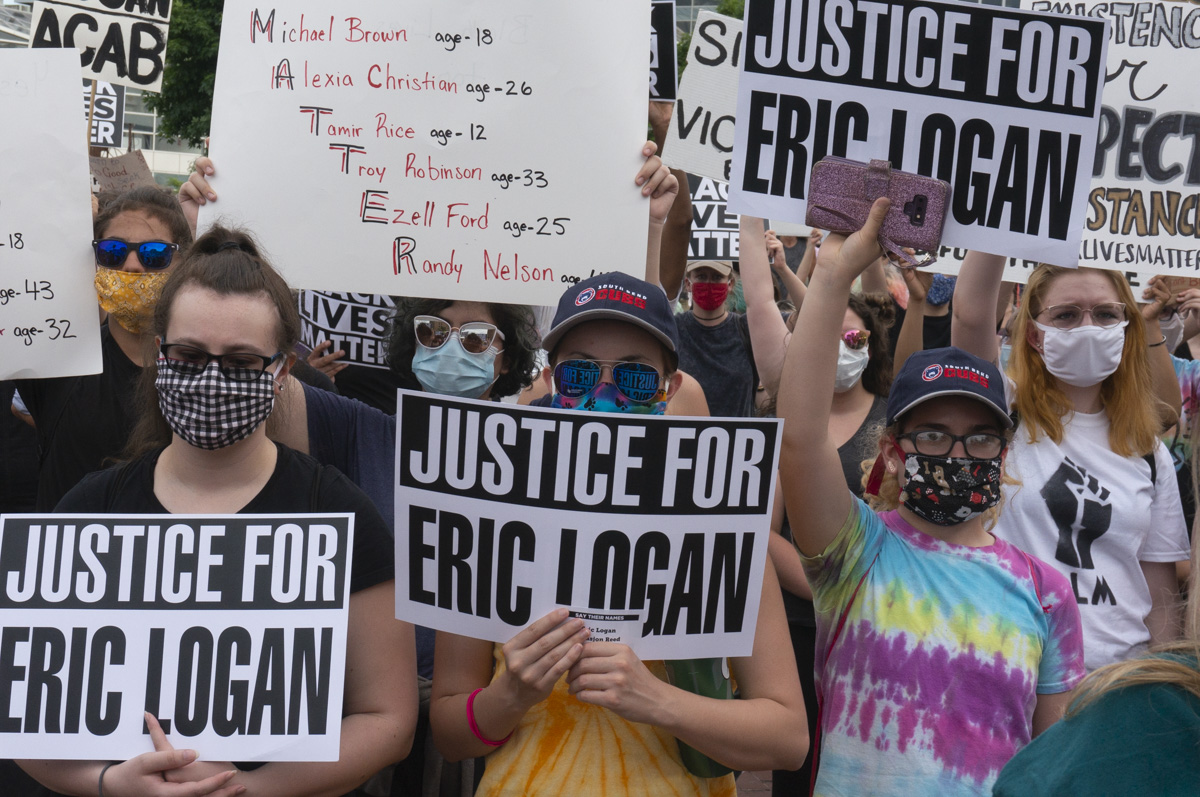
Protestors marching in response to the death of Eric Logan

After a white South Bend police officer shot and killed Eric Logan, an African American man, in June 2019, Buttigieg was drawn from his presidential campaign to focus on the emerging public reaction. Police body cameras were not turned on during Logan's death. Soon after Logan's death, Buttigieg presided over a town hall meeting attended by disaffected activists from the African American community as well as relatives of the deceased man. The local police union accused Buttigieg of making decisions for political gain. Buttigieg secured $180,000 in November 2019 to commission a review of South Bend's police department policies and practices, to be conducted by Chicago-based consulting firm 21CP Solutions.

Some African Americans have accused Buttigieg of racism for his response to this and other incidents. Former South Bend councilman Henry Davis Jr. alleged that Buttigieg "perpetuated and tolerated" systemic racism in the city. Michael Harriot, senior writer at The Root, accused Buttigieg of "racist paternalism" for saying that children of color lack role models that promote the value of education. Many African Americans also point to Buttigieg's firing of Darryl Boykins, South Bend's first black chief of police. Boykins claimed that Buttigieg used a scandal—involving secret tapes of white police officers making racist comments—as a pretext for firing him.

==== Increased national profile ====
In the 2016 U.S. Senate election in Indiana, he campaigned on behalf of Democratic Senate nominee Evan Bayh and criticized Bayh's opponent, Todd Young, for having voiced support in 2010 for retaining the military's don't ask, don't tell policy, which Bayh had voted to repeal. In the 2016 Democratic presidential primaries, Buttigieg endorsed Hillary Clinton. He also endorsed Democratic nominee Lynn Coleman in that year's election for Indiana's 2nd congressional district, which included South Bend.

Frank Bruni of The New York Times published a 2016 column praising Buttigieg's work as mayor, with a headline asking if he might be "the first gay president". Barack Obama cited him as one of the Democratic Party's talents in a November 2016 profile on the outgoing president conducted by The New Yorker. As Buttigieg's national profile grew following his run in the 2017 Democratic National Committee chairmanship election, Buttigieg increased his out-of-city travel. By early 2018, there was speculation that Buttigieg would run for either governor or president in 2020.

For the 2018 midterms, Buttigieg founded the political action committee (PAC) Hitting Home PAC. That October, Buttigieg personally endorsed 21 congressional candidates. He also later endorsed Mel Hall, Democratic nominee in the 2018 election for Indiana's 2nd congressional district. Buttigieg campaigned for Joe Donnelly's reelection campaign in the United States Senate election in Indiana. Buttigieg campaigned for candidates in more than a dozen states, including early presidential primary states such as Iowa and South Carolina, a move indicating potential interest in running for president. He officially announced his run on January 23, 2019.

==== Succession as mayor ====
Buttigieg announced that he would not seek a third term as mayor of South Bend in December 2018. Buttigieg endorsed James Mueller in the 2019 South Bend mayoral election. Mueller was a high-school classmate of Buttigieg's and his mayoral chief of staff, and later executive director of the South Bend Department of Community Investment. Mueller's campaign promised to continue the progress that had been made under Buttigieg's mayoralty. Buttigieg appeared in campaign advertisements for Mueller and donated to Mueller's campaign. Mueller won the May 2019 Democratic primary with 37 percent of the vote in a crowded field. In the November 2019 general election, Mueller defeated Republican nominee Sean M. Haas with 63 percent of the vote. Mueller took office on New Year's Day 2020.

== DNC chairmanship campaign ==
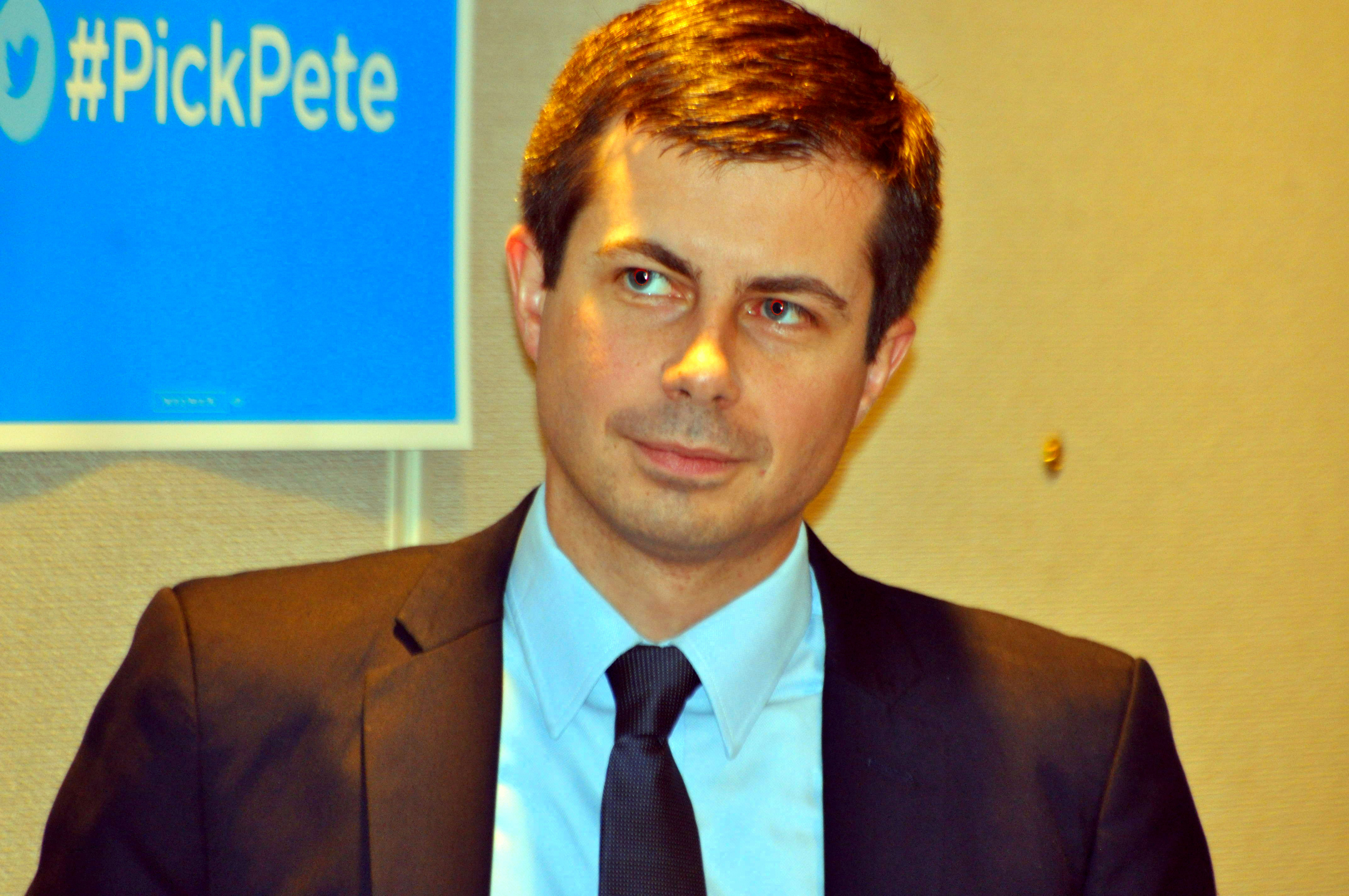
Buttigieg campaigning for DNC chairman in 2017

In January 2017, Buttigieg announced his candidacy for chairman of the Democratic National Committee (DNC) in its 2017 chairmanship election. He built a national profile as an emerging dark horse in the race for the chairmanship with the backing of former DNC chairman Howard Dean, former Maryland governor Martin O'Malley, Indiana senator Joe Donnelly, and North Dakota senator Heidi Heitkamp. Buttigieg campaigned on the need for the Democratic Party to empower its millennial members. Buttigieg pledged to resign as mayor if elected DNC chair.

Former U.S. secretary of labor Tom Perez and U.S. representative Keith Ellison quickly emerged as the favored candidates of a majority of DNC members. Buttigieg withdrew from the race on the day of the election without endorsing a candidate, and Perez was elected chairman after two rounds of voting.

== 2020 presidential campaign ==
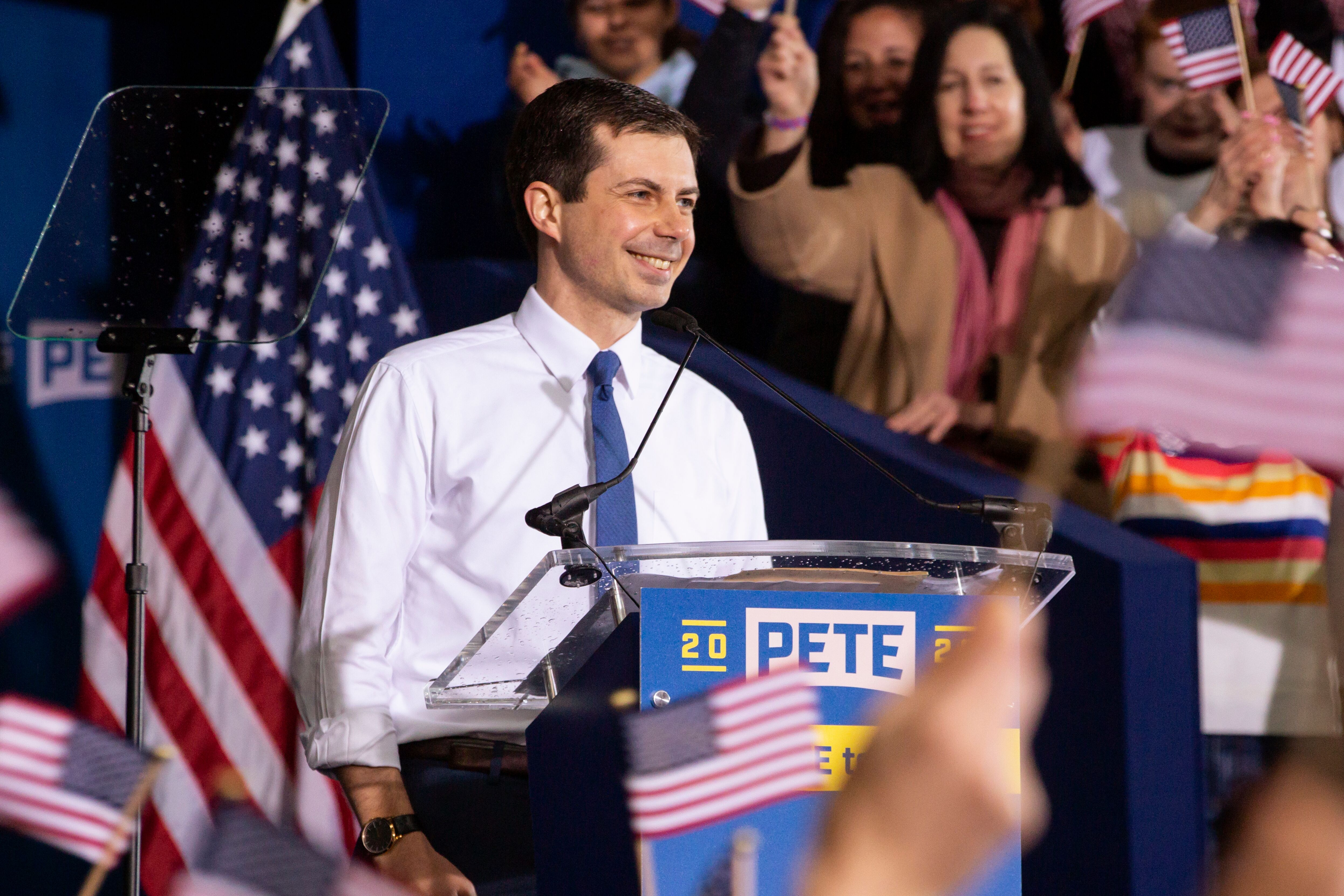
Buttigieg announcing his candidacy for president in 2020 on April 14, 2019

On January 23, 2019, Buttigieg announced that he was forming an exploratory committee to run for President of the United States in the upcoming 2020 election. Buttigieg sought the Democratic Party nomination for president. If he had been elected, he would have been the youngest and first openly gay American president. Amid the start of Buttigieg's presidential effort, on February 12, 2019, he published his debut book, autobiography Shortest Way Home. Two months later, Buttigieg officially launched his campaign on April 14, 2019, in South Bend.

Buttigieg described himself as a progressive and a supporter of democratic capitalism. Historian David Mislin identifies Buttigieg as a pragmatic progressive in the tradition of the Social Gospel movement once strong in the Midwest. Buttigieg identifies regulatory capture as a significant problem in American society.

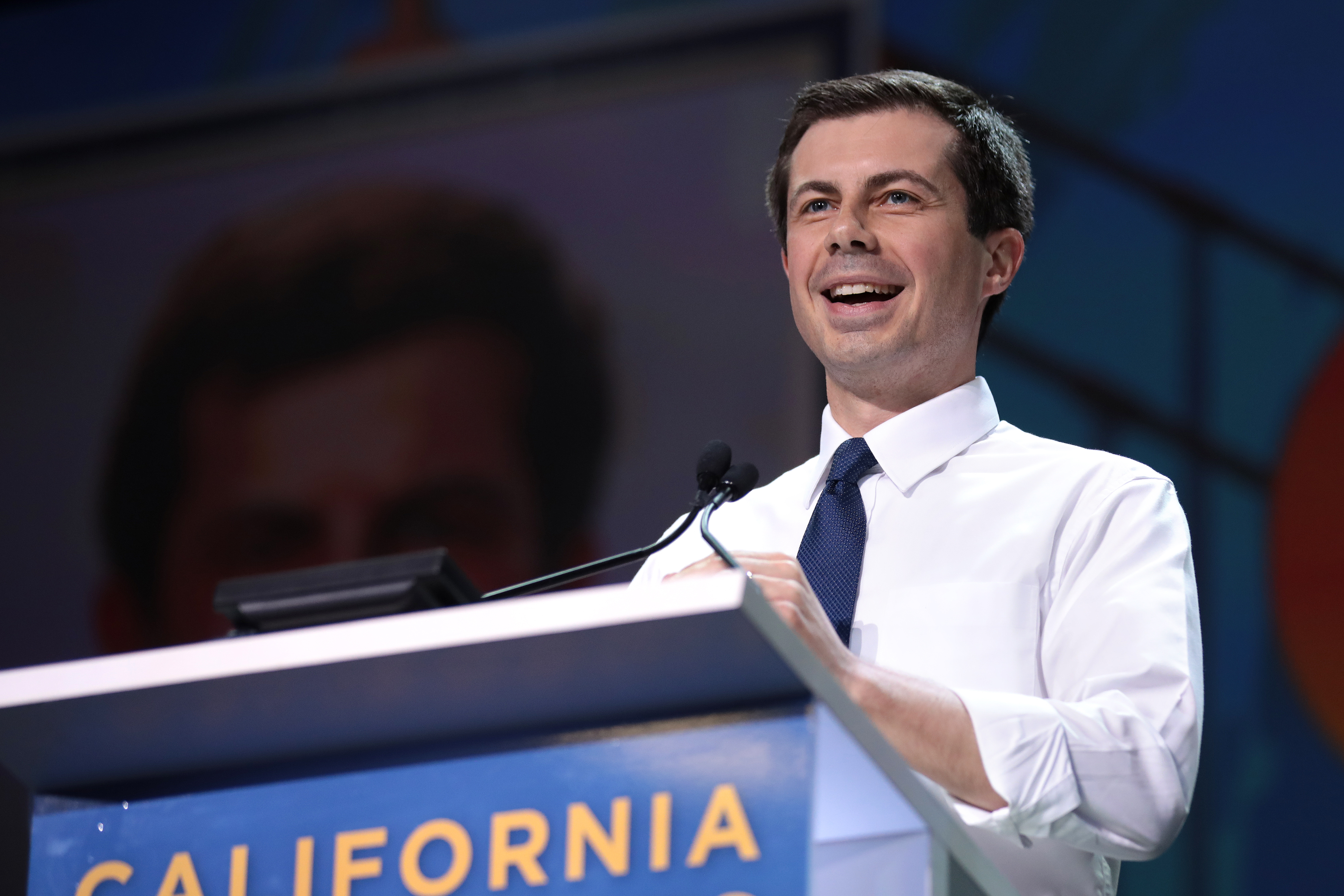
Buttigieg delivering speech at 2019 California Democratic State Convention

Initially regarded as a long-shot candidate, Buttigieg rose into the top-tier of candidates in the primary by December 2019. In early February 2020, Buttigieg led the 2020 Iowa Democratic caucuses results with 26.2 percent to Bernie Sanders' 26.1 percent, winning 14 delegates to Sanders's 12. The LGBTQ Victory Fund, Buttigieg's first national endorsement, (Note: Buttigieg was endorsed in June 2019 on the 50th anniversary of the Stonewall Uprising.) noted the historical first of an openly gay candidate winning a state presidential primary. Buttigieg finished second behind Sanders in the New Hampshire primary. After placing fourth in the South Carolina primary with 8.2 percent of the vote, behind Joe Biden (48.7 percent), Bernie Sanders (19.8 percent), and Tom Steyer (11.3 percent), Buttigieg dropped out of the race on March 1, 2020, and endorsed Biden.

A 2023 study by political scientists from Loyola Marymount University reported how different aspects of Buttigieg's biography affected voters' views on his electability as a US president. The authors concluded, that "His military background... successfully countered voter discrimination, suggesting that some gay candidates may close the gap once voters learn more about their story."

=== Post-presidential campaign ===
In April 2020, Buttigieg launched Win The Era PAC, a new super PAC to raise money and distribute it to down-ballot Democrats. The PAC focused on local elected positions, and its list of endorsements included candidates such as Jaime Harrison, Cal Cunningham, Gina Ortiz Jones, Christine Hunschofsky, and Levar Stoney. On June 8, 2020, the University of Notre Dame announced that it had hired Buttigieg as a teacher and researcher for the 2020–21 academic year. Also, in October 2020, Buttigieg released his second book, Trust: America's Best Chance.

Buttigieg acted as a surrogate for Biden's campaign in the general election. He delivered a speech on the closing night of the 2020 Democratic National Convention, and also announced Indiana's votes during the convention's roll call. On September 5, 2020, Buttigieg was announced to be a member of the advisory council of the Biden-Harris Transition Team that was planning the presidential transition of Joe Biden. Ahead of the vice presidential debate, Buttigieg played the role as a stand-in for Republican vice president Mike Pence to prepare vice-presidential nominee Kamala Harris. Buttigieg was selected to perform this role because of his experience working with Pence during their simultaneous tenures as mayor of South Bend and governor of Indiana, respectively.

== Secretary of Transportation (2021–2025) ==
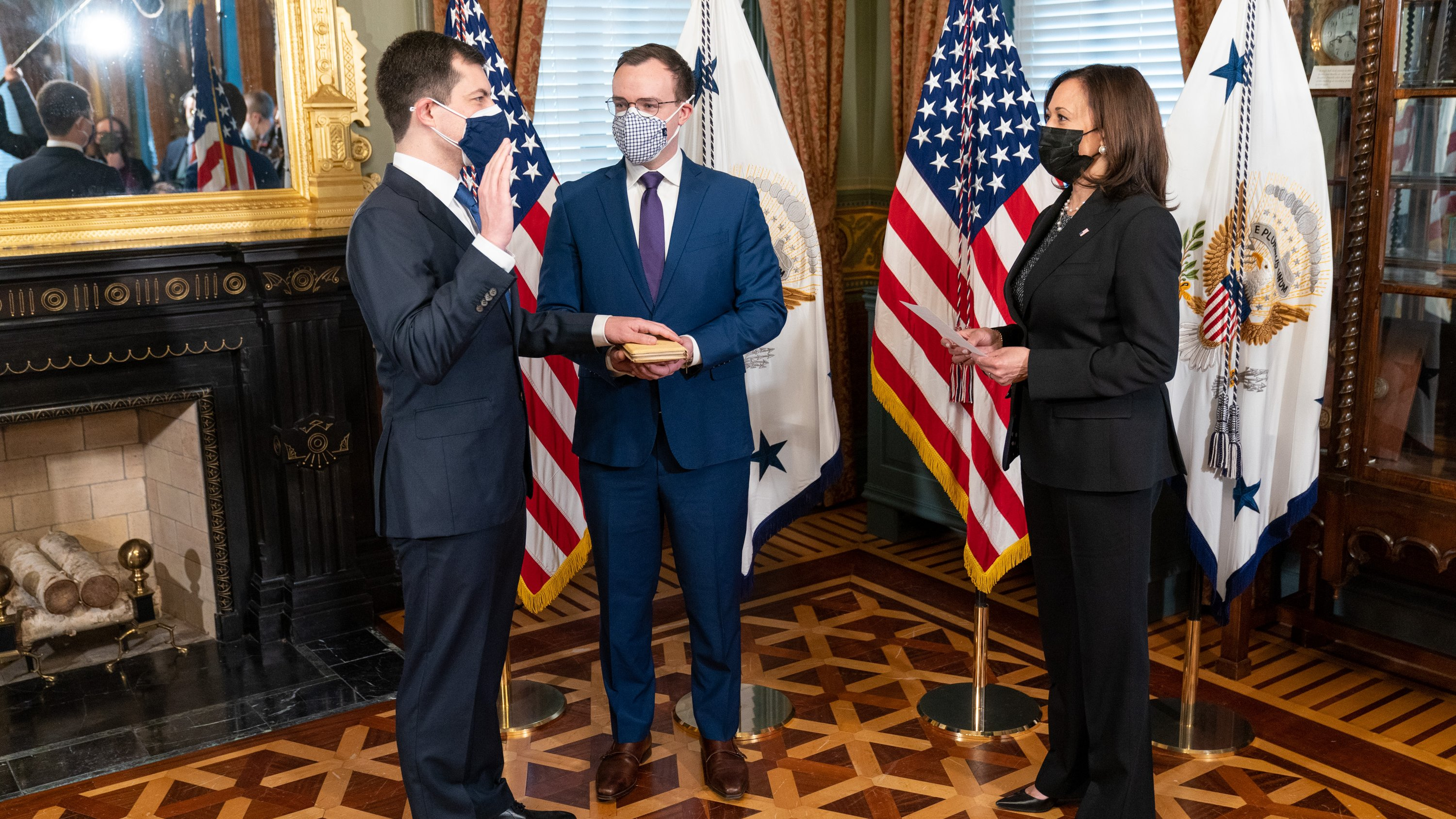
Vice President Kamala Harris swears in Buttigieg as Transportation secretary on February 3, 2021.

=== Nomination and confirmation ===
Following the end of his presidential campaign, Buttigieg was considered a possible Cabinet appointee in Joe Biden's administration. After Biden was declared the winner of the election on November 7, 2020, Buttigieg was again mentioned as a possible nominee for secretary of veterans affairs, ambassador to the United Nations, ambassador to China or secretary of transportation. On December 15, 2020, Biden announced that he would nominate Buttigieg as his secretary of transportation. The Senate Commerce Committee advanced Buttigieg's nomination to the full Senate with a vote of 21–3. Buttigieg was confirmed on February 2, 2021, with a vote of 86–13, and was sworn in the next morning.

=== Tenure ===
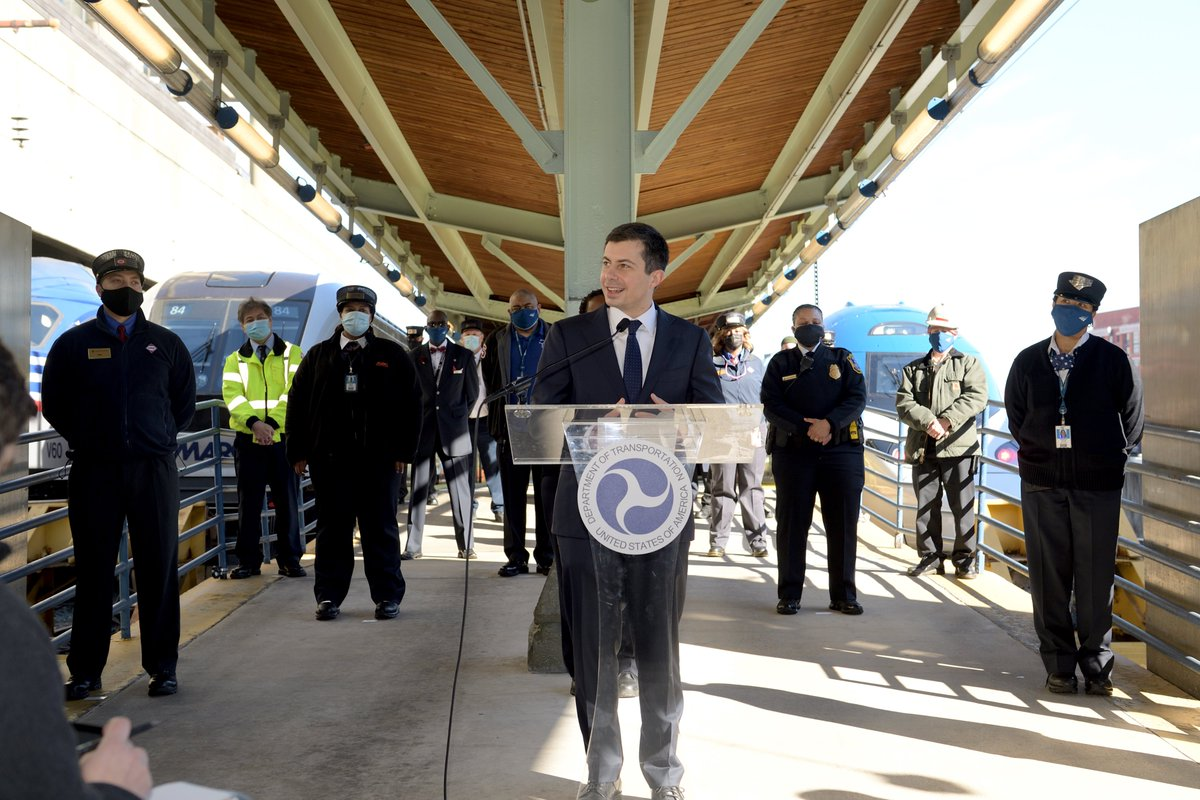
Buttigieg visits Washington Union Station on his first full day as secretary of transportation.

As secretary of transportation, Buttigieg worked on re-organizing the department's internal policy structure, including carrying out a thorough review process of rules enacted under the Trump administration. For example, Buttigieg reinstated an Obama-era pilot program which ensures local hiring for public works projects on May 19, 2021, with the goal of helping minorities and disadvantaged individuals. This program had been revoked in 2017 during the Trump administration, when the Department of Transportation returned to rules established during the Reagan administration, which banned geographic-based hiring preferences.

Buttigieg addressed the African American Mayors Association in late February 2021 to discuss systemic racism. He argued that misguided investments in the federal transport and infrastructure policy had contributed to racial inequity. In early March 2021, Politico noted that Buttigieg had mentioned racial equity in almost every interview he gave to the press as it related to his work at the department. In late June 2022, Buttigieg launched a $1 billion Reconnecting Communities pilot program to establish racial equity in roads. Using money from the Infrastructure Investment and Jobs Act, the program aims to reconnect cities and neighborhoods divided by roads through projects such as rapid bus lines, pedestrian walkways, and planning studies.

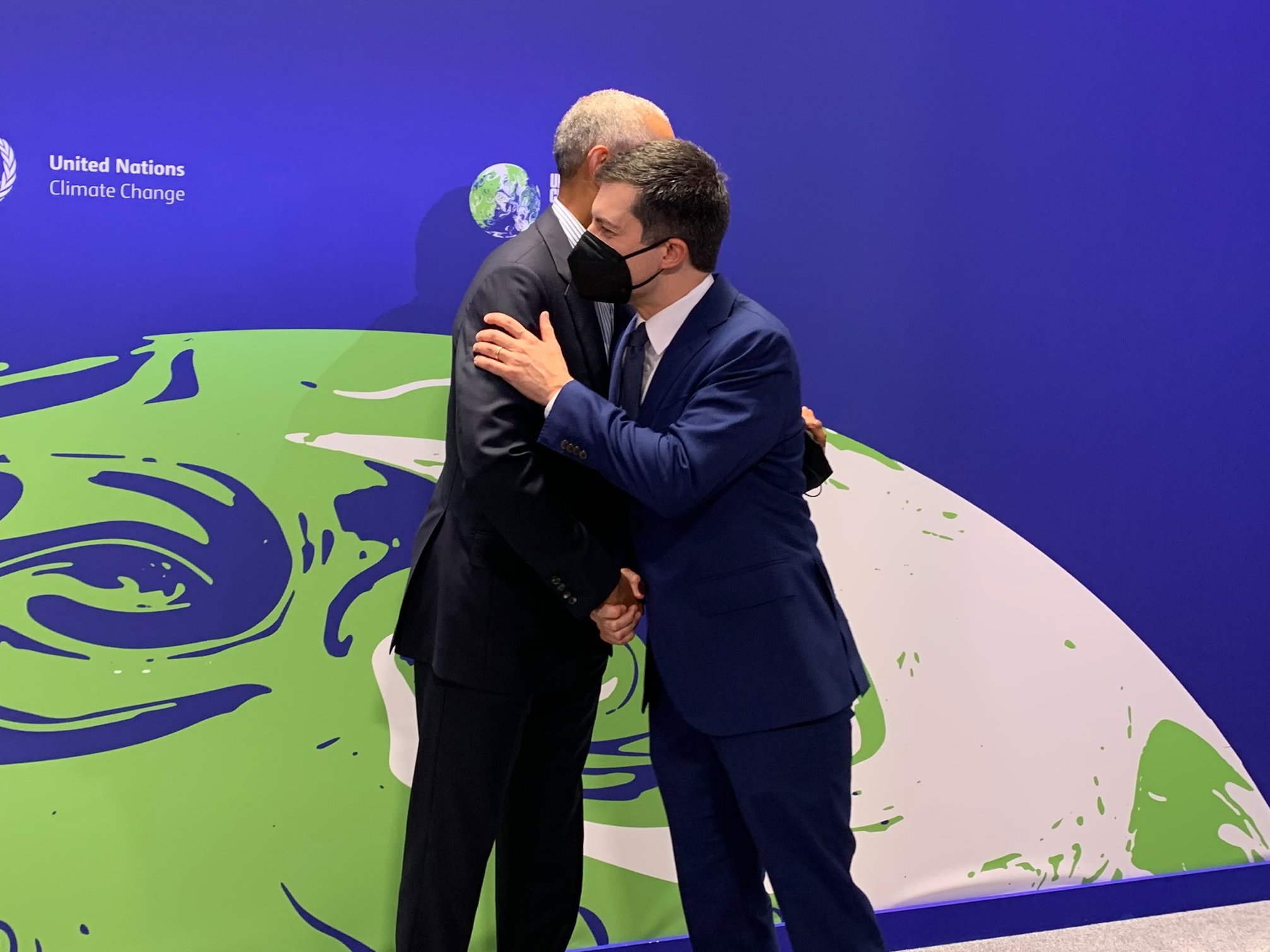
Buttigieg and Barack Obama at the COP26 climate summit in Glasgow on November 9, 2021

After the 2021 birth of his twins, Buttigieg took a parental leave. This became a point of prominent criticism and ridicule from conservative and Republican figures. Some political analysts have noted homophobic tones to the attacks on Buttigieg's decision to take a parental leave. After conservatives criticized him for taking a paternity leave, Buttigieg declared that he would not apologize for "taking care of my premature newborn infant twins. The work that we are doing is joyful, fulfilling, wonderful work." According to his department, Buttigieg had been on paid leave since mid-August 2021, where for a month he was "mostly offline except for major agency decisions and matters that could not be delegated", and he "has been ramping up activities since then", making many media appearances in early October 2021. The White House had approved Buttigieg's leave.

After passage of the Infrastructure Investment and Jobs Act, Insider called Buttigieg "the most powerful transportation secretary ever", as the department now has $210 billion of discretionary grants to award.

President Biden named him to the White House Competition Council, which coordinated policies to promote economic competition.

==== Aviation ====
After serious issues that had occurred in United States passenger aviation in 2022 such as Southwest Airlines' holiday meltdown, Buttigieg faced criticism for not taking enough action to penalize negligent airlines. Buttigieg subsequently directed the Department of Transportation to address monopolization and consumer rights in the industry. President Biden and Secretary Buttigieg launched flightrights.gov, an airline customer service dashboard that informs airline customers of the compensation they are entitled to after flight cancellations or delays. He also created a chief competition officer position in the department. In March 2023, Buttigieg opposed the proposed merger of Spirit Airlines and Frontier Airlines as anticompetitive.

In December 2023, the Department of Transportation imposed a record fine of $140 million on Southwest Airlines for mass violations of consumer protection laws in 2022 when the company cancelled flights and left more than 2 million passengers stranded. On October 30, 2024, Buttigieg announced that a rule had taken effect requiring airlines to automatically provide refunds to passengers whose flights are canceled and do not accept another flight, as well as if paid services are not provided.

Buttigieg supports The Junk Fee Prevention Act. If enacted on the federal level it would lower fees relating to spending money on some forms of entertainment, hotel rooms, airport related services, and travel.

==== Infrastructure ====
Buttigieg informed Congress in late March 2021 that the Biden administration was planning to prioritize the construction of the Gateway Rail Tunnel Project due to its economic significance. The progress of the project, which was stalled by President Trump, was said to be moving faster, according to Senate Majority Leader Chuck Schumer. Buttigieg announced the environmental impact assessment of the project—which was largely seen as a sign of major progress on the project. Also, Buttigieg has served as a promoter of the American Jobs Plan and the Infrastructure Investment and Jobs Act.

==== Other actions ====
Early into his tenure, Buttigieg noted that the United States's actions surrounding road traffic safety are lacking and suggested improving the design of roads. Also, while acknowledging how the United States fell behind other developed countries with respect to bicycle and pedestrian safety, Buttigieg encouraged greater focus on human behavior in infrastructure policy. Likewise, in March 2021, Buttigieg indicated he was open to tolls on Interstate 80, but not the tollage of bridges, suggesting "big picture solutions" instead, like a mileage tax. However, the Biden administration did not include a gas tax or mileage tax in the infrastructure plan it released that month.

In June 2021, the White House created a task force to address supply chain disruptions, with Buttigieg as one of its leaders. By October 2021, global supply bottlenecks had resulted in record shortages of household goods for American consumers. Buttigieg cited high demand and the pandemic as some of the causes for the disruptions, while predicting that the disruptions would "continue into next year".

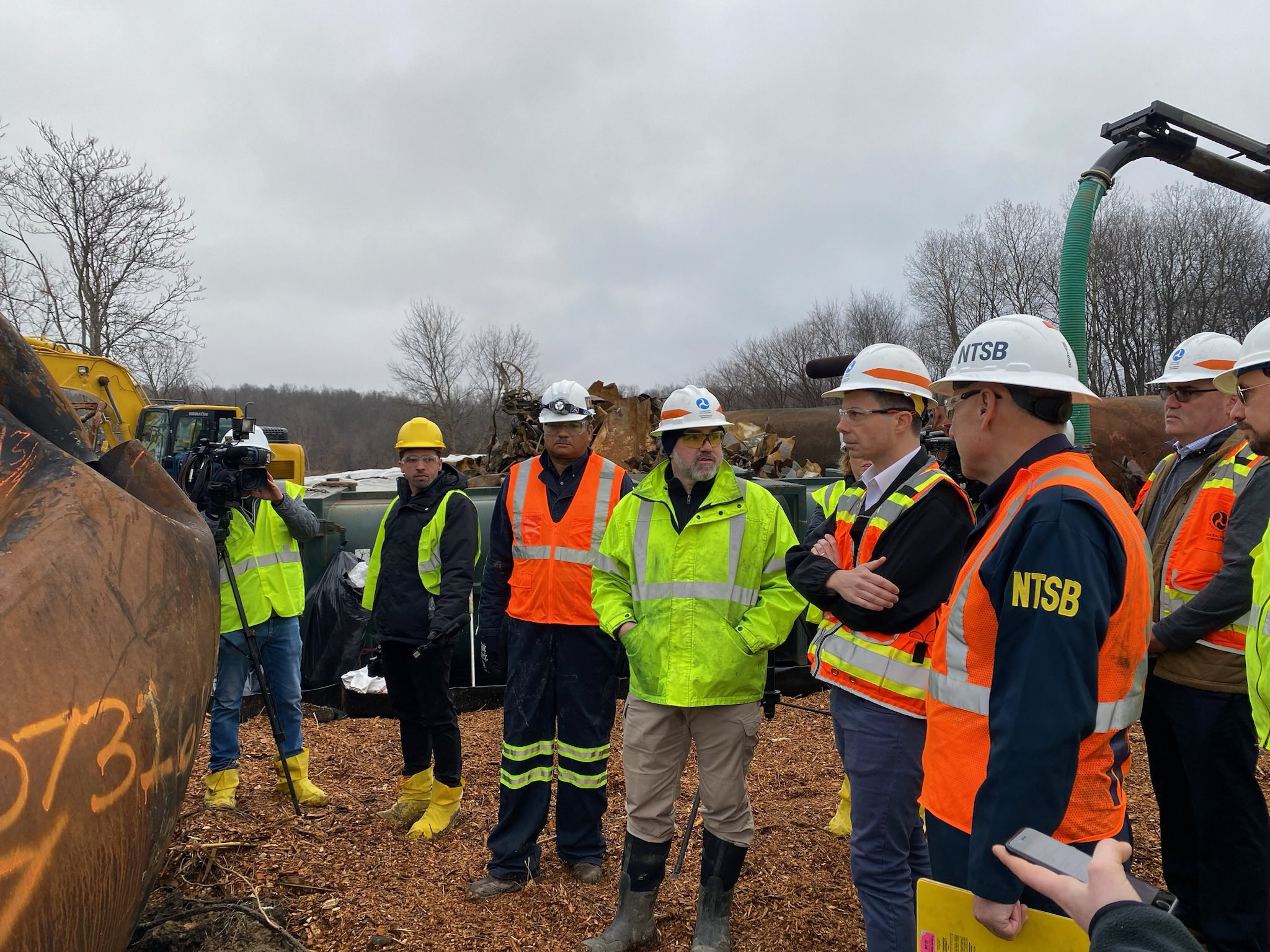
Buttigieg in East Palestine, Ohio on February 23, 2023

On February 3, 2023, a freight train carrying vinyl chloride, butyl acrylate, ethylhexyl acrylate and ethylene glycol monobutyl ether derailed along the Norfolk Southern Railway in East Palestine, Ohio. At the request of state officials, emergency crews conducted a controlled burn of the spill, releasing hydrogen chloride and phosgene into the air. As a result, residents within a 1-mi (1.6-km) radius were evacuated. Buttigieg tweeted on February 13 the Department would "use all relevant authorities to ensure accountability and continue to support safety." On February 23, 2023, NTSB released a preliminary report stating that the wheel bearings overheated, with temperatures as high as 253 °F (141 °C) above the ambient temperature. In the weeks following the derailment, the Transportation Department, under Buttigieg, did not move to reinstate the 2015 rail safety rule aimed at expanding the use of better braking technology, which the Trump administration had revoked. Buttigieg's Transportation Department was contemplating stripping down brake safety rules even further. Buttigieg has faced some criticism from figures on different ends of the political spectrum for his response to the derailment, receiving criticism from Democrats such as Nina Turner and Ilhan Omar and Republicans such as JD Vance and Anna Paulina Luna. Former president Donald Trump also criticized Buttigieg for not having yet visited the site while conducting a visit of his own. In March 2023, Buttigieg appeared on CNN, telling the cable news network that he had failed to anticipate the fallout from the derailment and erred in not visiting East Palestine sooner.

== Post-secretary career (2025–present) ==
In January 2025, news reports emerged that Buttigieg considered a run for U.S. Senate in Michigan, with the announced retirement of U.S. senator Gary Peters. Previously, he had expressed interest in running for the state's gubernatorial election to succeed incumbent governor Gretchen Whitmer, who was term-limited. From February to April 2025, Buttigieg served as a fellow at the University of Chicago Institute of Politics, delivering a seminar on campus every week. In March 2025, Buttigieg opted not to run for the U.S. Senate in Michigan in 2026, with sources saying that he was instead mulling a run for president in 2028.

Kamala Harris, the 2024 Democratic presidential nominee, reported in her 2025 book 107 Days that she wanted to choose Buttigieg as her running mate, but decided against it. She chose to not select him due to concerns about Buttigieg's sexuality (combined with Harris's own background as a woman and racial minority) affecting the ticket's electability.

In November 2026, Buttigieg announced his third book, Next, planned to release in January 2027.

== Political positions ==
During his 2020 presidential run and after, Buttigieg has been variously described as a moderate or centrist Democrat, a progressive, or a technocratic liberal. In 2019, Buttigieg labeled himself both as a progressive and a democratic capitalist but has simultaneously downplayed this, saying "these labels are becoming less and less useful" and that political ideology has "never been less relevant."

=== Infrastructure ===
During his 2020 campaign for the Democratic nomination, Buttigieg proposed spending $1 trillion on U.S. infrastructure projects over the next ten years, estimating that the plan would create at least six million jobs. The plan focused on green energy, protecting tap water from lead, fixing roads and bridges, improving public transportation, repairing schools, guaranteeing broadband internet access, and preparing communities for floods and other natural disasters.

=== Social issues ===
Buttigieg supports abortion rights and the repeal of the Hyde Amendment, which blocks federal funding for abortion services except in cases of rape, incest, or if the life of the mother is in danger. He favors amending civil rights legislation, including the Federal Equality Act, so that LGBT Americans receive federal non-discrimination protections.

Buttigieg supports expanding opportunities for national service, including a voluntary year of national service for those turning 18 years old.

In July 2019, Buttigieg shared his "Douglass Plan", named after abolitionist Frederick Douglass, to address systemic racism in America. The initiative would allocate $10 billion to African American entrepreneurship over five years; grant $25 billion to historically black colleges; legalize marijuana; expunge drug convictions; halve the federal prison population; and propose a federal New Voting Rights Act designed to increase voting access.

Buttigieg supports abolishing the death penalty, moving toward reversing criminal sentences for minor drug-related offenses, and eliminating incarceration for drug possession offenses.

In 2019, Buttigieg called for the United States to decriminalize mental illness and addiction via initiatives such as re-entry programs. Also, he aspired to decrease incarceration rates because of mental illnesses or substance use by 75 percent during his first term as President of the United States.

=== Voting rights ===
Buttigieg favors the abolition of the Electoral College and has also called for restoring voting rights to felons who have completed their prison sentences.

=== Campaign finance reform ===
Buttigieg supports a constitutional amendment on campaign finance to reduce the undue influence of money in politics. During his 2020 presidential run, in response to accusation of campaign finance concerns, Buttigieg's campaign told Newsweek that he did not accept contributions from individuals and organizations such as corporate political action committees. In addition, Buttigieg's campaign emphasized that Buttigieg had included critical campaign finance reforms as part of his campaign platform, including pushing to overturn Citizens United and Buckley v. Valeo.

=== Statehood advocacy ===
Buttigieg supports statehood for the District of Columbia, and said that he would support Puerto Rico statehood if desired by the Puerto Rican people.

=== Climate change ===
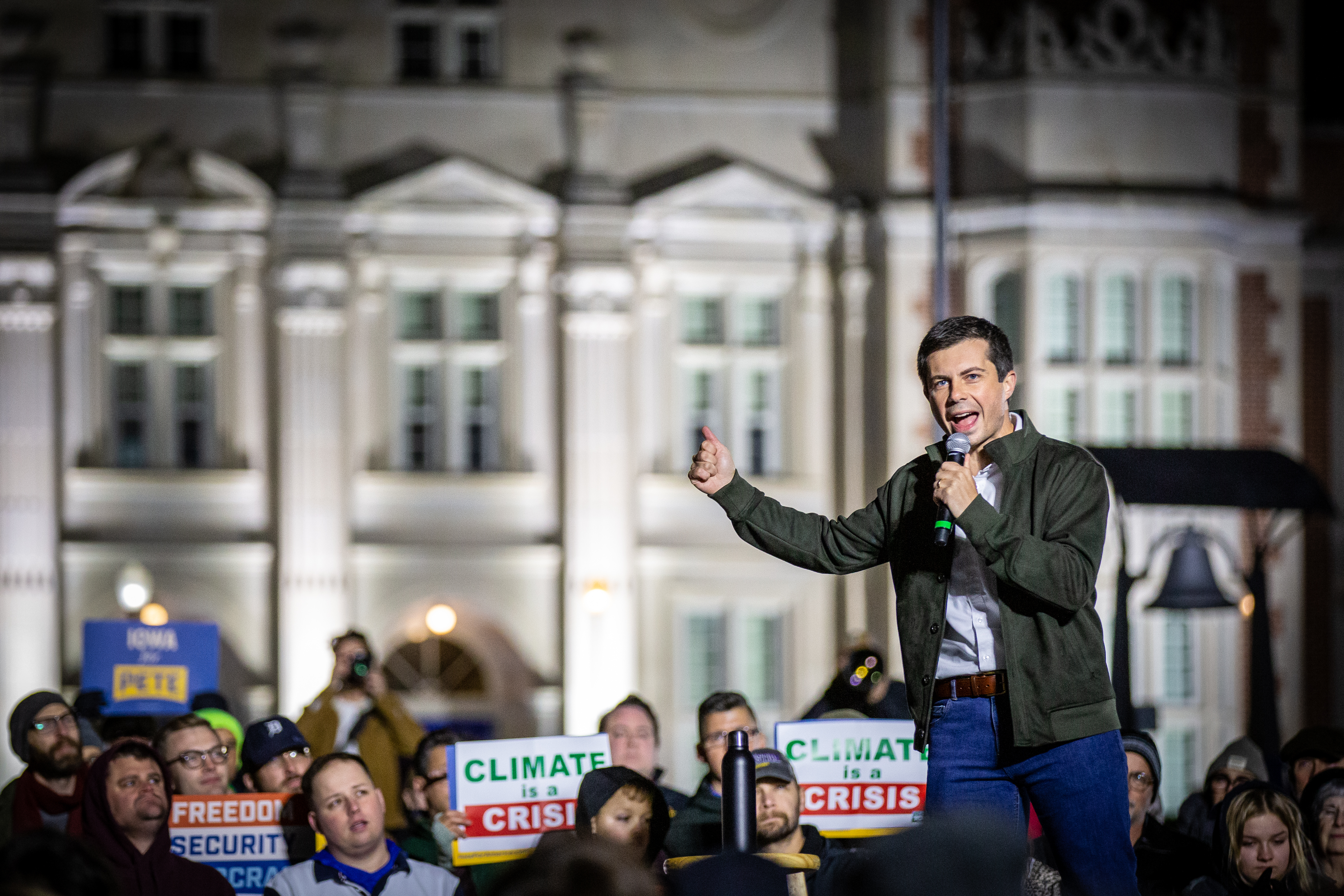
Buttigieg at a town hall meeting in Des Moines on October 12, 2019, with supporters holding signs saying "Climate is a Crisis"

During his campaign for the Democratic presidential nomination, Buttigieg stated that, if elected, he would restore the United States' commitment to the Paris Climate Agreement and double its pledge to the Green Climate Fund. He also supports the Green New Deal proposed by House Democrats, solar panel subsidies, and a carbon tax and dividend policy to reduce greenhouse gas emissions.

=== Economic beliefs ===
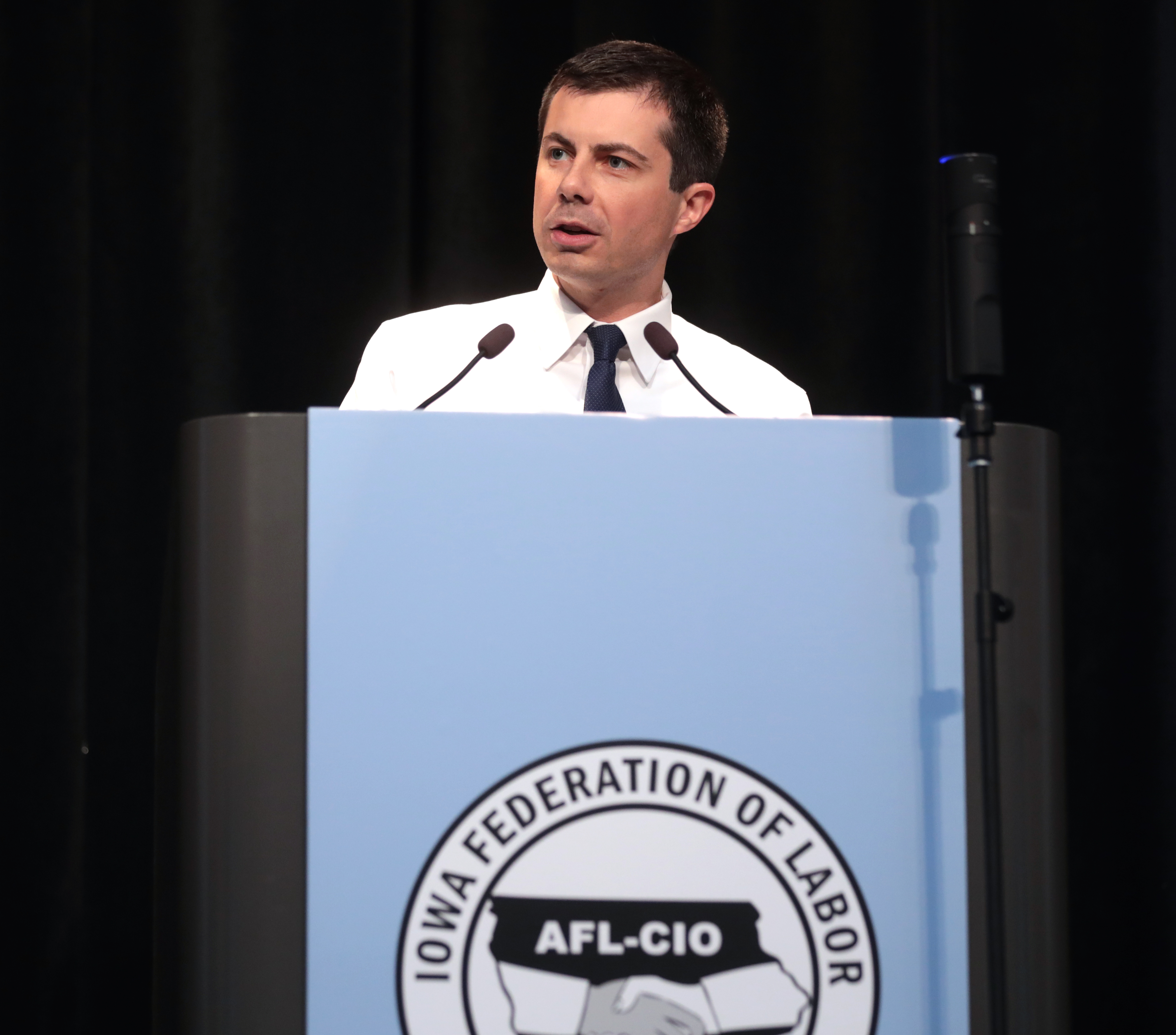
Buttigieg speaking at the 2019 Iowa Federation of Labor Convention

Buttigieg identifies as a democratic capitalist and has decried crony capitalism. He has entertained the possibility of antitrust actions against large technology companies on the basis of privacy and data security concerns. During the Democratic primary, he supported deficit and debt reduction, arguing that large debt makes it harder to invest in infrastructure, health and safety.

=== Workers' rights ===
In July 2019, he released a plan to strengthen union bargaining power, to raise the minimum wage to $15, and to offer national paid family leave.

=== Education ===
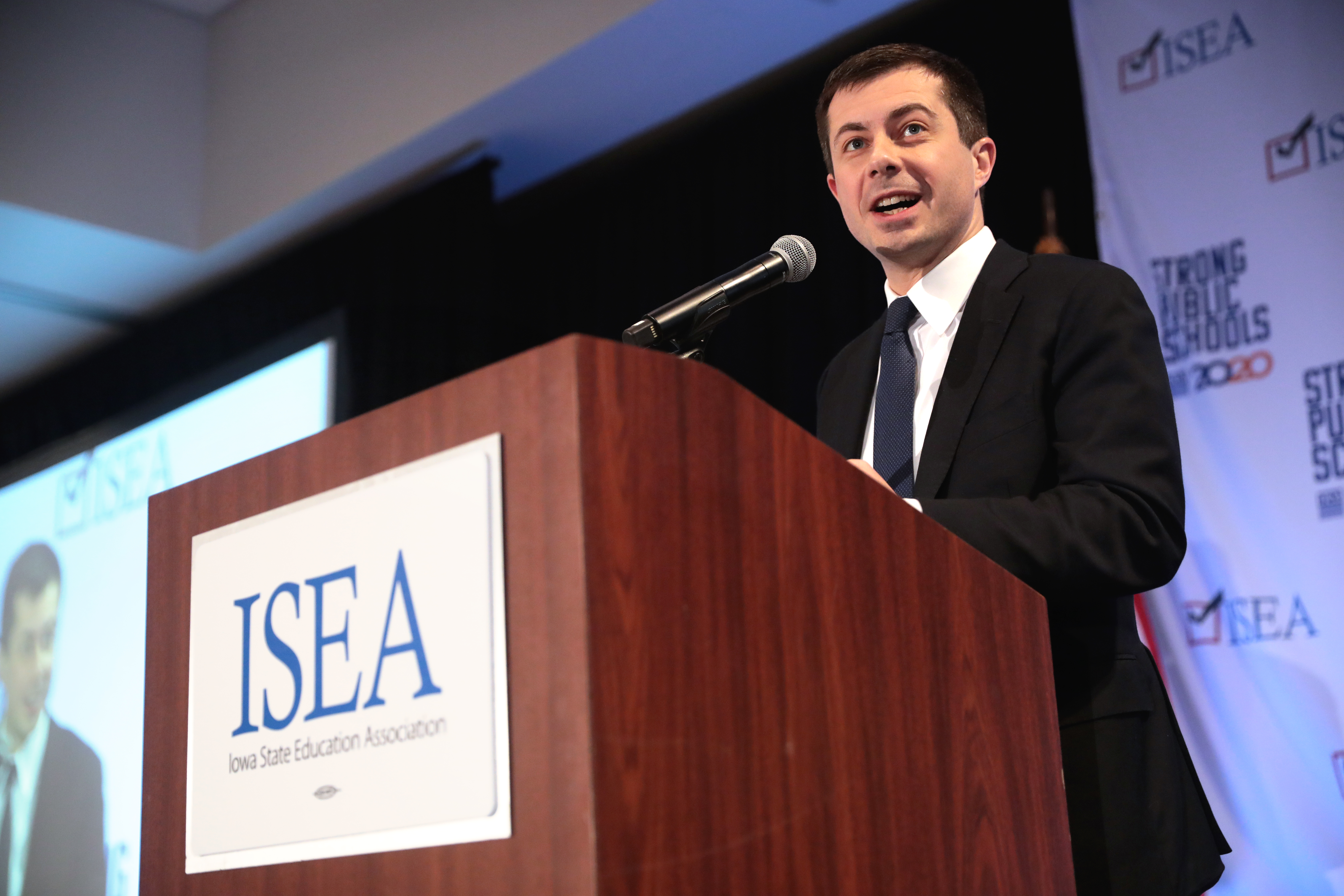
Buttigieg speaking to the Iowa State Education Association in 2020

Buttigieg's education plan includes a $700-billion investment in universal full-day child care and pre-kindergarten for all children from infancy to age five. Buttigieg has also proposed tripling Title I funding for schools serving students predominately from lower socioeconomic backgrounds. Other goals include doubling the number of new teachers of color in the next 10 years; addressing school segregation with a $500-million fund; paying teachers more; expanding mental health services in schools; and creating more after-school programs and summer learning opportunities.

His plan for debt-free college has called for expanding Pell Grants for low-income students, as well as other investments and reversing Trump's tax cuts for the wealthy. Under Buttigieg's college plan, the bottom 80 percent of students with respect to income would have received free education, while the top 20 percent would have paid for at least some portion of their tuition. Buttigieg has opposed free college tuition for all students because he has believed universally free tuition unfairly subsidizes higher-income families at the expense of lower-income individuals who do not attend college. This position distinguished Buttigieg from his competitors in the 2020 presidential election.

=== Foreign policy ===
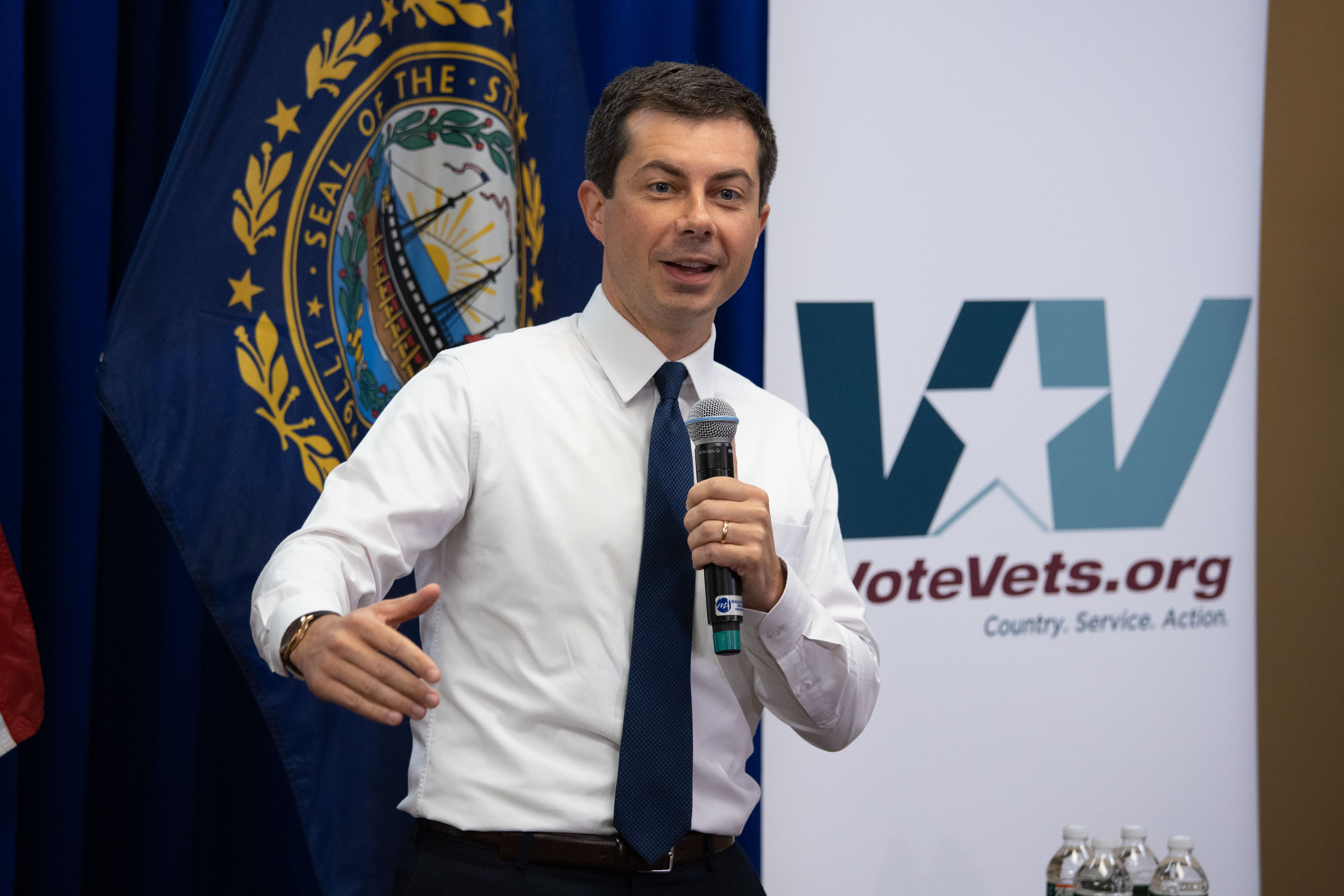
Buttigieg speaking with VoteVets.org in 2019

In 2020, Buttigieg called for modifying the structure of defense spending, while suggesting that he might favor an overall increase in defense spending.

Buttigieg has said that he believes the 2001 U.S. invasion of Afghanistan following the September 11 attacks was justified but supported the planned withdrawal of American troops from the region with a maintained intelligence presence.

In 2008, Buttigieg wrote an op-ed in The New York Times calling on the United States to support the de facto independent Republic of Somaliland.

In June 2019, Buttigieg said: "We will remain open to working with a regime like the Kingdom of Saudi Arabia for the benefit of the American people. But we can no longer sell out our deepest values for the sake of fossil fuel access and lucrative business deals." He supports ending U.S. support for Saudi Arabia in Saudi Arabia's war in Yemen.

Buttigieg has condemned China for its mass detention of ethnic Uyghurs in Xinjiang. He criticized Trump's decision to withdraw U.S. troops from Syria, which critics say gave Turkey the green light to launch its military offensive against Syrian Kurds.

==== Israel ====
Buttigieg is a committed supporter of Israel. He favors a two-state solution to the Israeli–Palestinian conflict. He opposes proposals for Israel to annex the Israeli-occupied West Bank, and disapproves of Israeli prime minister Benjamin Netanyahu's comments in support of applying Israeli law in Jewish settlements in the West Bank.

In an August 2025 interview on Pod Save America, Buttigieg did not give a clear answer on whether he supported limiting arms sales to Israel. He said, "I think that we, as Israel's strongest ally and friend, you put your arm around your friend when there's something like this going on, and talk about what we're prepared to do together." Following widespread criticism for his comments, Buttigieg said he would support limiting arms sales to Israel, as well as U.S. recognition of Palestine. In 2026, Buttigieg did not respond when asked by Politico if he would reject support from AIPAC, a pro-Israel lobby group.

=== Healthcare ===
Buttigieg opposed Republican efforts to repeal the Affordable Care Act.

In 2018, Buttigieg said he favored Medicare for All. During his presidential campaign, Buttigieg has promoted Medicare for All Who Want It, which includes a public option for health insurance. He has spoken favorably of Maryland's all-payer rate setting. Buttigieg has described Medicare for All Who Want It as inclusive, more efficient than the current system, and a possible precursor or "glide path" to single-payer health insurance. He also favors a partial expansion of Medicare that would allow Americans ages 50 to 64 to buy into Medicare, and supports proposed legislation, the Family and Medical Insurance Leave Act, that would "create a fund to guarantee up to 12 weeks of partial income for workers to care for newborn children or family members with serious illnesses."

In August 2019, Buttigieg released a $300 billion plan to expand mental health care services and fight addiction.

=== Immigration ===
Buttigieg supports Deferred Action for Childhood Arrivals (DACA) and repeatedly criticized the first Trump administration's aggressive deportation policies. In March 2017, he wrote an article for the HuffPost defending a resident of Granger, Indiana, who was deported after living in the U.S. for 17 years despite regularly checking in with ICE and applying for a green card.

In January 2019, Buttigieg told CBS News that Trump had been "reckless" in sending American troops to the Southern border, calling the decision "a measure of last resort".

== Personal life ==
The Cathedral of St. James, which Buttigieg has attended

Buttigieg is a Christian, and he has said his faith has had a strong influence in his life. He was baptized in the Catholic Church as an infant and attended Catholic schools. While at the University of Oxford, Buttigieg attended Christ Church Cathedral, saying he felt "more-or-less Anglican" by the time he returned to South Bend. Augustine of Hippo, Catholic priest James Martin, and Garry Wills are among his religious influences. A member of the Episcopal Church, Buttigieg attended the Cathedral of St. James while living in South Bend.

Besides his native English, Buttigieg has some knowledge of Norwegian, Spanish, Italian, Maltese, Arabic, Dari Persian, and French. Buttigieg plays guitar and piano, and in 2013 performed with the South Bend Symphony Orchestra as a guest piano soloist with Ben Folds. Buttigieg was a 2014 Aspen Institute Rodel Fellow.

Buttigieg came out as gay in a June 2015 piece in the South Bend Tribune, becoming Indiana's first openly gay elected executive. He was the first elected official in Indiana to come out while in office and the highest elected official in Indiana to come out.

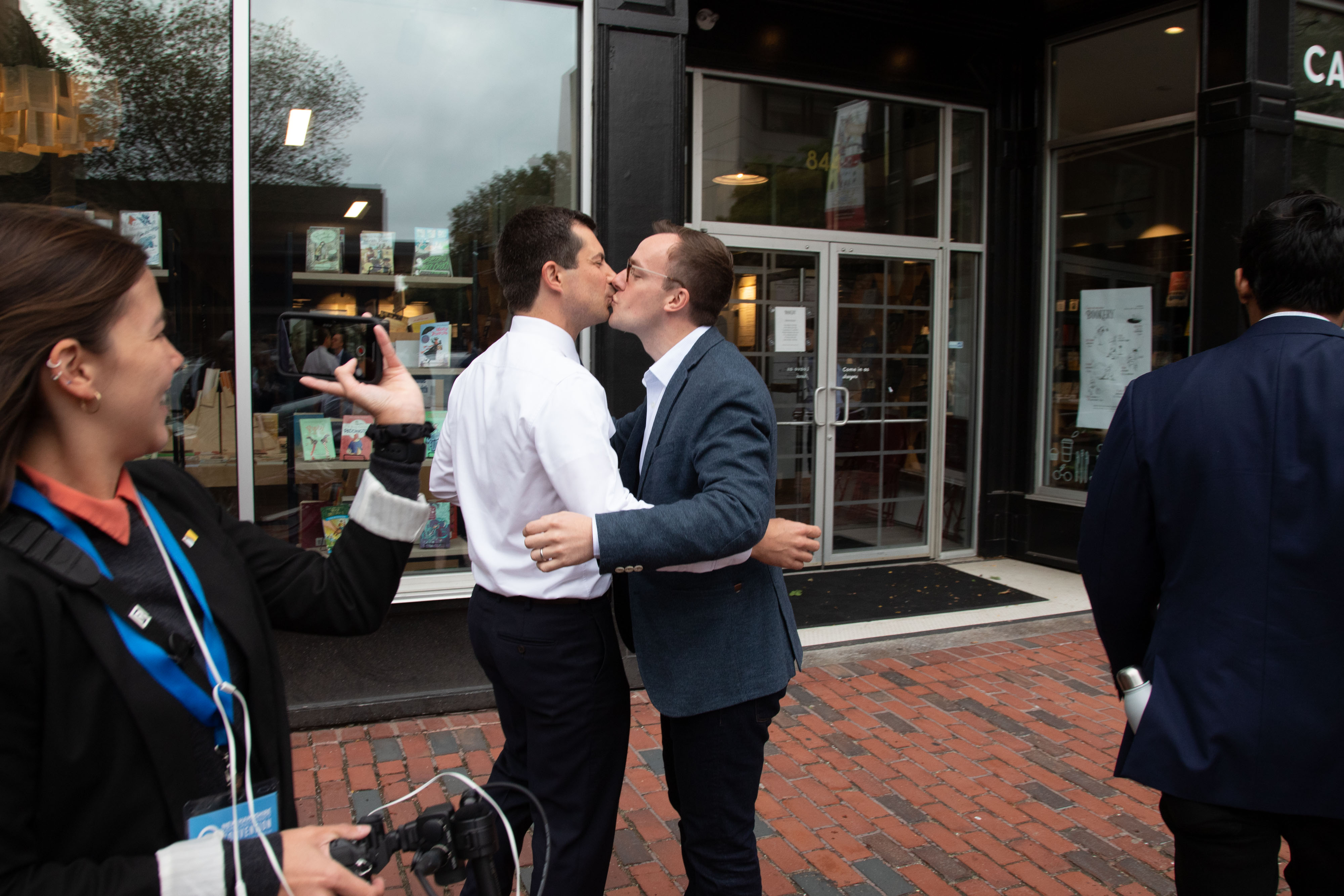
Pete and Chasten Buttigieg in 2019

Buttigieg announced his engagement to Chasten Glezman, a junior high school teacher, in a December 14, 2017, Facebook post. They had been dating since August 2015 after meeting on the dating app Hinge. They were married on June 16, 2018, in a private ceremony at the Cathedral of St. James. This made Buttigieg the first mayor of South Bend to get married while in office. Chasten uses the surname Buttigieg.

Buttigieg announced on August 17, 2021, that he and his husband had become parents. He elaborated on September 4, 2021, that they had adopted two newborn fraternal twins.

In July 2022, Buttigieg established his permanent residence in Traverse City, Michigan, which is Chasten's hometown, and registered to vote in Michigan. In June 2026, a false report was filed with child protective services against Buttigieg, alleging that his 4-year-old children were at risk due to a claimed violent history. The children were taken in for forensic interviews while their fathers were not allowed to be present. CPS determined the report to be false. Buttigieg described the incident as "the ugliest thing that has happened to me since my career in service began."

== Awards and honors ==
Buttigieg was a 2015 recipient of the Fenn Award, given by the John F. Kennedy Presidential Library in recognition of his work as mayor. To mark the 50th anniversary of the Stonewall riots in June 2019, Queerty named him one of its "Pride50" people—"trailblazing individuals who actively ensure society remains moving towards equality, acceptance and dignity for all queer people". At the Golden Heart Awards, run by God's Love We Deliver, Buttigieg was awarded the "Golden Heart Award for Outstanding Leadership and Public Service" in October 2019. Equality California, an LGBT-rights organization, gave Buttigieg and his husband Chasten their Equality Trailblazer Award in August 2020. Attitude, a British gay lifestyle magazine, named Buttigieg their 2020 Person of the Year to recognize his groundbreaking run for the presidency. In August 2024, Buttgieg was inducted by the LGBTQ Victory Fund into the LGBTQ+ Political Hall of Fame.

== Electoral history ==
Indiana State Treasurer election, 2010
Party	Candidate	Votes	%
Republican	Richard Mourdock (incumbent)	1,053,527	62.46
Democratic	Pete Buttigieg	633,243	37.54
Total votes		1,686,770	

South Bend mayoral election, 2011 Democratic primary
Party	Candidate	Votes	%
Democratic	Pete Buttigieg	7,663	54.90
Democratic	Michael J. Hamann	2,798	20.05
Democratic	Ryan Dvorak	2,041	14.62
Democratic	Barrett Berry	1,424	10.20
Democratic	Felipe N. Merino	32	0.23
Total votes		13,958	

South Bend mayoral election, 2011
Party	Candidate	Votes	%
Democratic	Pete Buttigieg	10,991	73.85
Republican	Norris W. Curry Jr.	2,884	19.38
Libertarian	Patrick M. Farrell	1,008	6.77
Total votes		14,883	

South Bend mayoral election, 2015 Democratic primary
Party	Candidate	Votes	%
Democratic	Pete Buttigieg (incumbent)	8,369	77.68
Democratic	Henry L. Davis, Jr.	2,405	22.32
Total votes		10,774	

South Bend mayoral election, 2015
Party	Candidate	Votes	%
Democratic	Pete Buttigieg (incumbent)	8,515	80.41
Republican	Kelly S. Jones	2,074	19.59
Total votes		10,589	

Results of the 2020 Democratic Party presidential primaries
Party	Candidate	Votes	%
Democratic	Joe Biden	18,448,092	51.5
Democratic	Bernie Sanders	9,536,123	26.6
Democratic	Elizabeth Warren	2,781,720	7.8
Democratic	Michael Bloomberg	2,475,323	6.9
Democratic	Pete Buttigieg	913,023	2.6
Democratic	Amy Klobuchar	524,559	1.5
Democratic	Tulsi Gabbard	270,792	0.8
Democratic	Tom Steyer	258,907	0.7
Democratic	Andrew Yang	160,416	0.5
Democratic	Others	458,477	1.3
Total votes		35,827,432	100.00

2021 United States Senate confirmation to be Secretary of Transportation
February 2, 2021	Party			Total
	Democratic	Republican	Independent	Total
Yes	48	36	2	86
No	0	13	0	13
Simple majority (51 of 99 votes) required – Nomination confirmed

== Books ==
- Shortest Way Home: One Mayor's Challenge and a Model for America's Future. New York: Liveright. 2019. ISBN 978-1-63149-437-6.
- Trust: America's Best Chance. New York: Liveright. 2020. ISBN 978-1-63149-877-0.

== See also ==
- Hitting Home PAC, former PAC he controlled
- List of first openly LGBTQ politicians in the United States
- List of polyglots
- Mayor Pete – 2021 American documentary film

== Notes ==
Party political offices
Preceded by Michael Griffith	Democratic nominee for Treasurer of Indiana; 2010	Succeeded by Mike Boland
Political offices
Preceded by Steve Luecke	Mayor of South Bend; 2012–2020	Succeeded by James Mueller
Preceded by Elaine Chao	United States Secretary of Transportation; 2021–2025	Succeeded by Sean Duffy
U.S. order of precedence (ceremonial)
Preceded by Alejandro Mayorkas as Former U.S. Cabinet Member	Order of precedence of the United States as Former U.S. Cabinet Member	Succeeded by Denis McDonough as Former U.S. Cabinet Member
