= Trust: America's Best Chance =

2020 book by Pete Buttigieg

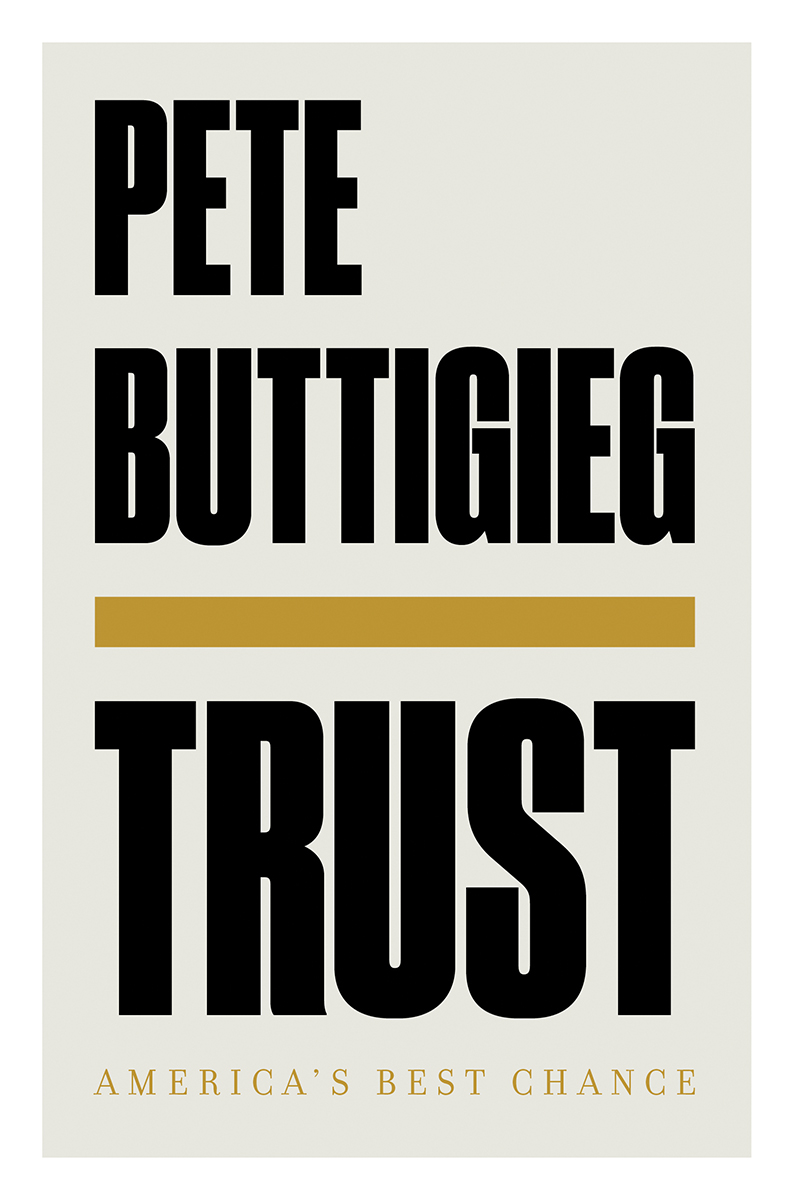
- Book's promotional cover
- Author: Pete Buttigieg
- Audio read by: Pete Buttigieg
- Language: English
- Genre: Autobiography
- Publisher: Liveright
- Publication date: 6 October 2020
- Publication place: United States
- Media type: Print (hardcover)
- Pages: 224
- ISBN: 978-1-63149-877-0
- Dewey Decimal: 320.51/30973
- LC Class: JK1764 .B898 2020

Trust: America's Best Chance is a book written by Pete Buttigieg, the former Mayor of South Bend, Indiana and former 2020 Democratic presidential candidate. The book was published by Liveright Publishing on October 6, 2020.

== Summary ==
In the book, Pete Buttigieg demonstrates how a breakdown of trust is central to the nation's current predicament—and how our future depends on finding ways to instill confidence in the American project, and in each other.
