= Michael Gorra =

American academic

Michael Gorra (born 17 February 1957) is an American scholar of English and American literature. He is the Mary Augusta Jordan Professor Emeritus of English Language and Literature at Smith College, where he has taught since 1985.

== Writing and teaching ==
Gorra's Portrait of a Novel: Henry James and the Making of an American Masterpiece (2012) is a critical biography that uses its commentary on James's 1881 novel, The Portrait of a Lady, as a point of entry not only into James's life but also into the literary culture of the late nineteenth century. It was praised by Cynthia Ozick for presenting its subject with all “the sensuous immediacy of his quotidian reality: the rooms he lived in, the streets he trod, and the very texture of his inmost sensibility…. In Gorra's ingenious and capacious reading, James stands before us with a clarity of seeing and feeling given to no previous biographer.”

His other books include The English Novel at Mid-Century (1990), an account of British fiction in the generation of Evelyn Waugh and Anthony Powell, which began as a doctoral thesis at Stanford University, where it won the English Department's Alden Dissertation Prize. It was followed by a study of the postcolonial novel, After Empire: Scott, Naipaul, Rushdie (1997), and The Bells in Their Silence: Travels through Germany (2004), which grew out of a sabbatical year spent in that country. Edited volumes include The Portable Conrad and the Norton Critical Edition of William Faulkner’s As I Lay Dying.

Gorra is a regular contributor to the ''New York Review of Books''. In addition, his essays and reviews appear frequently in such journals as the Times Literary Supplement, the New York Times Book Review, The Hudson Review, and the Daily Beast. His travel essays have twice been included in the annual volumes of The Best American Travel Writing. In 2001 Gorra received the Balakian award from the National Book Critics Circle Award for his work as a reviewer. Other honors include grants from the National Endowment for the Humanities and a 2007 Guggenheim Fellowship for his first year's work on Portrait of a Novel. Portrait of a Novel was a finalist for the Pulitzer Prize in Biography and the 2012 National Book Critics Circle Award (Biography). In a review in the ''Wall Street Journal'', Colm Tóibín said that the book "offers an exemplary approach to what remains a complex and fascinating subject."

At Smith College, Gorra's classes concentrate on fiction from the nineteenth century to the present day, including courses on the contemporary novel, Faulkner, and George Eliot’s Middlemarch.

== Background ==
Gorra was born in New London, Connecticut, and grew up along the Connecticut shore, graduating from Waterford High School in 1975. While in school he became active in science fiction fandom, and he published several issues of his own fanzines, Banshee and Random, between 1973 and 1975.

He earned his A.B. at Amherst College in 1979 and a Ph.D. at Stanford University.

He currently resides in Northampton, Massachusetts, with his wife, the art historian Brigitte Buettner.

== Bibliography ==
- The English Novel at Mid-Century: From the Leaning Tower. London: Macmillan. 1990. ISBN 978-1349114597.
- After Empire: Scott, Naipaul, Rushdie. Chicago: University of Chicago Press. 1997. ISBN 978-0226304748.
- The Bells in Their Silence: Travels through Germany. Princeton: Princeton University Press. 2004. ISBN 978-0691117652.
- Portrait of a Novel: Henry James and the Making of an American Masterpiece. New York: Liveright. 2012. ISBN 978-0871404084.
- The Saddest Words: William Faulkner's Civil War. New York: Liveright. 2020. ISBN 978-1631491702.
- The Storytellers: Reading the Masterpieces of Nineteenth-Century Short Fiction. Chicago: The University of Chicago Press. 2026. ISBN 978-0226825557.
