= Sarah Lyall =

American journalist (born 1963)

- Born: Sarah Lambert Lyall c. 1963
- Education: Chapin School; Phillips Exeter Academy; Yale University
- Occupation: Journalist
- Employer: The New York Times
- Notable work: The Anglo Files: A Field Guide to the British
- Title: Writer at large

Sarah Lambert Lyall is an American journalist who has long written for The New York Times, currently as a writer at large and including an 18-year period as the paper's London correspondent.

== Biography ==
Raised in New York City, Lyall attended the Chapin School, and is a graduate of Phillips Exeter Academy, class of 1981, and of Yale University.

Over a career at The New York Times, Lyall has written "for nearly every desk" at the paper. Her current title there is "writer at large," which she explains as "meaning that I’m not assigned to a single department but cover a range of topics." She served as London correspondent for the Times for 18 years, ending in 2013 when she returned to New York City.

She has written about prosopagnosia, or face-blindness, a condition from which she suffers.

Lyall married the author and journalist Robert McCrum in 1995, they had two daughters, and they later divorced. She remarried in 2021.

== Bibliography ==
- Lyall, Sarah; The Anglo Files: A Field Guide to the British New York: W. W. Norton, 2008. ISBN 978-0-393-05846-8
- McCrum, Robert; and Sarah Lyall. My Year Off: Recovering Life After a Stroke. New York: W.W. Norton, 1998. ISBN 0-393-04656-7 ISBN 978-0393046564
