= Prison Notebooks =

Series of essays by Antonio Gramsci

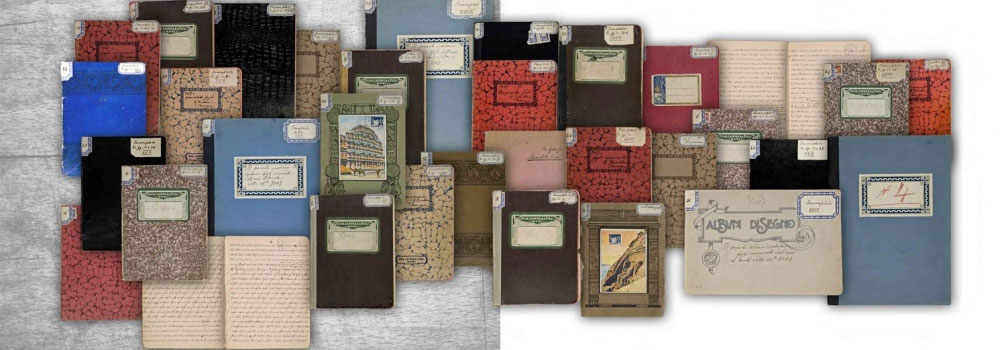
- Exhibition of the Quaderni del carcere, Sardinia
- Author: Antonio Gramsci
- Language: Italian
- Publication date: 1947
- Publication place: Italy
- English publication date: 1971
- ISBN: 9780717802708
- OCLC: 6991462

The Prison Notebooks (Italian: Quaderni del carcere [kwaˈdɛrni del ˈkartʃere]) are a series of essays written by the Italian Marxist Antonio Gramsci. Gramsci was imprisoned by the Italian Fascist regime in 1926. The notebooks were written between 1929 and 1935, when Gramsci was released from prison to a medical center on grounds of ill-health. His friend, Piero Sraffa, had supplied the writing implements and notebooks. Gramsci died in April 1937.

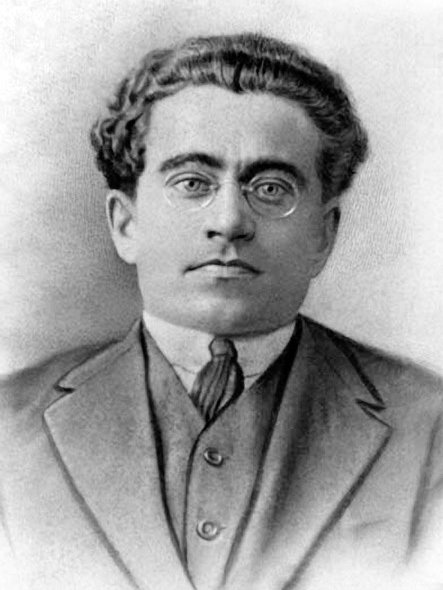
Antonio Gramsci, depicted in 1922

Gramsci wrote more than 30 notebooks and 3,000 pages of history and analysis during his imprisonment. The original Prison Notebooks are kept at the Fondazione Gramsci in Rome. These notebooks were initially smuggled out of prison, catalogued by Gramsci's sister-in-law Tatiana Schucht, and sent to Moscow for safekeeping. They were returned to Italy after World War II and have since been preserved by the Gramsci Foundation.

Although written unsystematically, the Prison Notebooks are considered a highly original contribution to 20th century political theory. Gramsci drew insights from varying sources – not only other Marxists but also thinkers such as Niccolò Machiavelli, Vilfredo Pareto, Georges Sorel and Benedetto Croce. His notebooks cover a wide range of topics, including Italian history and nationalism, the French Revolution, Fascism, Taylorism and Fordism, civil society, folklore, religion and high and popular culture.

Smuggled out of the prison in the 1930s, the first edition was published in 1947 and won the Viareggio Prize a few months later. Gramsci's posthumous award of the Viareggio Prize was followed by a memorial from the Constituent Assembly of Italy on April 28, 1947. The first published translations in English of some of the notebooks were made by Louis Marks in 1957, with more extensive Selections from the Prison Notebooks translated by Quintin Hoare and Geoffrey Nowell-Smith printed in 1971.

Ideas in Marxist theory, critical theory and educational theory that are associated with Gramsci's name include:

- Cultural hegemony as a means of maintaining the capitalist state.
- The need for popular workers' education to encourage development of intellectuals from the working class.
- The distinction between political society (the police, the army, legal system, etc.) which dominates directly and coercively, and civil society (the family, the education system, trade unions, etc.) where leadership is constituted through ideology or by means of consent.
- "Absolute historicism".
- A critique of economic determinism that opposes fatalistic interpretations of Marxism.
- A critique of philosophical materialism.

== Background ==
A supposed assassination attempt on Benito Mussolini's life on 31 October 1926, on 8 November led to the establishment of secret police powers under Mussolini's regime. These powers were used to arrest Gramsci, in spite of his parliamentary immunity. Following a show trial in May 1928, Gramsci was sentenced to 20 years imprisonment. Following his trial, Gramsci was brought to a prison in Turi, where he spent the first five years of his sentence and began writing the Prison Notebooks in February 1929. By this time, his health had started to decline. When his health permitted, Gramsci spent much of his time in prison reading Marxist texts and commentary on them, though access to these texts was censored by the prison. He wrote extensively during this period, filling his notebooks with small handwriting.

== Concepts ==
=== Hegemony ===
Hegemony was a concept previously used by Marxists such as Vladimir Ilyich Lenin to indicate the political leadership of the working-class in a democratic revolution, but developed by Gramsci into an acute analysis to explain why the 'inevitable' socialist revolution predicted by orthodox Marxism had not occurred by the early 20th century. Capitalism, it seemed, was even more entrenched than ever. Capitalism, Gramsci suggested, maintained control not just through violence and political and economic coercion, but also ideologically, through a hegemonic culture in which the values of the bourgeoisie became the 'common sense' values of all. Thus a consensus culture developed in which people in the working-class identified their own good with the good of the bourgeoisie, and helped to maintain the status quo rather than revolting.

The working class needed to develop a culture of its own, which would overthrow the notion that bourgeois values represented 'natural' or 'normal' values for society, and would attract the oppressed and intellectual classes to the cause of the proletariat. Lenin held that culture was 'ancillary' to political objectives but for Gramsci it was fundamental to the attainment of power that cultural hegemony be achieved first. In Gramsci's view, any class that wishes to dominate in modern conditions has to move beyond its own narrow 'economic-corporate' interests, to exert intellectual and moral leadership, and to make alliances and compromises with a variety of forces. Gramsci calls this union of social forces a 'historic bloc', taking a term from Georges Sorel. This bloc forms the basis of consent to a certain social order, which produces and re-produces the hegemony of the dominant class through a nexus of institutions, social relations and ideas. In this manner, Gramsci developed a theory that emphasized the importance of the superstructure in both maintaining and fracturing relations of the base.

Gramsci stated that, in the West, bourgeois cultural values were tied to religion, and therefore much of his polemic against hegemonic culture is aimed at religious norms and values. He was impressed by the power Roman Catholicism had over people's minds and the care the Church had taken to prevent an excessive gap developing between the religion of the learned and that of the less educated. Gramsci believed that it was Marxism's task to marry the purely intellectual critique of religion found in Renaissance humanism to the elements of the Reformation that had appealed to the masses. For Gramsci, Marxism could supersede religion only if it met people's spiritual needs, and to do so people would have to recognize it as an expression of their own experience.

For Gramsci, hegemonic dominance ultimately relied on coercion, and in a "crisis of authority" the "masks of consent" slip away, revealing the fist of force.

=== Intellectuals and education ===
Gramsci gave much thought to the question of the role of intellectuals in society. Famously, he stated that all people are intellectuals, in that all have intellectual and rational faculties, but not all people have the social function of intellectuals. He claimed that modern intellectuals were not simply talkers, but directors and organisers who helped build society and produce hegemony by means of ideological apparatuses such as education and the media. Furthermore, he distinguished between a traditional intelligentsia (traditional intellectuals) which sees itself (wrongly) as a class apart from society, and the thinking groups which every class produces from its own ranks organically. Such organic intellectuals do not simply describe social life in accordance with scientific rules, but rather articulate, through the language of culture, the feelings and experiences which the masses could not express for themselves. The need to create a working-class culture relates to Gramsci's call for a kind of education that could develop working-class intellectuals, who would not simply introduce Marxist ideology from outside the proletariat, but rather renovate and make critical the status quo of the already existing intellectual activity of the masses. His ideas about an education system for this purpose correspond with the notion of critical pedagogy and popular education as theorized and practised in later decades by Paulo Freire in Brazil, and have much in common with the thought of Frantz Fanon. For this reason, partisans of adult and popular education consider Gramsci an important voice to this day.

=== State and civil society ===
Gramsci's theory of hegemony is tied to his conception of the capitalist state, which he claims rules through force plus consent. The state is not to be understood in the narrow sense of the government; instead, Gramsci divides it between political society, which is the arena of political institutions and legal constitutional control, and civil society, which is commonly seen as the private or non-state sphere, differentiated from both the state and the economy. The former is the realm of force and the latter of consent. He stresses, however, that the division is purely conceptual and that the two, in reality, often overlap.

Gramsci claims that hegemony lies under modern capitalism and that the bourgeoisie can maintain its economic control by allowing certain demands made by trade unions and mass political parties within civil society to be met by the political sphere. Thus, the bourgeoisie engages in Passive revolution by going beyond its immediate economic interests and allowing the forms of its hegemony to change. Gramsci posits that movements such as reformism and fascism, as well as the 'scientific management' and assembly line methods of Frederick Taylor and Henry Ford respectively, are examples of this.

Drawing from Machiavelli, he argues that The Modern Prince – the revolutionary party – is the force that will allow the working-class to develop organic intellectuals and an alternative hegemony within civil society. For Gramsci, the complex nature of modern civil society means that the only tactic capable of undermining bourgeois hegemony and leading to socialism is a war of position (analogous to trench warfare); this war of position would then give way to a war of movement (or frontal attack). Gramsci saw war of movement as being exemplified by the storming of the Winter Palace during the Russian Revolution.

Despite his claim that the lines between the two may be blurred, Gramsci rejects the state-worship that results from identifying political society with civil society, as was done by the Jacobins and Fascists. He believes the proletariat's historical task is to create a regulated society and defines the withering away of the state as the full development of civil society's ability to regulate itself.

=== Historicism ===
Gramsci, like the early Marx, was an emphatic proponent of historicism. In Gramsci's view, all meaning derives from the relation between human practical activity (or praxis) and the objective historical and social processes of which it is a part. Ideas cannot be understood outside their social and historical context, apart from their function and origin. The concepts by which we organise our knowledge of the world do not derive primarily from our relation to things, but rather from the social relations between the users of those concepts. As a result, there is no such thing as an unchanging human nature, but only an idea of such which varies historically. Furthermore, philosophy and science do not reflect a reality independent of humanity, but rather are only true in that they express the real developmental trend of a given historical situation.

For the majority of Marxists, truth was truth no matter when and where it is known, and scientific knowledge (which included Marxism) accumulated historically as the advance of truth in this everyday sense. On this view, Marxism does not belong to the illusory realm of the superstructure because it is a science. In contrast, Gramsci believed Marxism was true in the socially pragmatic sense, in that by articulating the class consciousness of the proletariat, it expressed the truth of its times better than any other theory. This anti-scientistic and anti-positivist stance was indebted to the influence of Benedetto Croce. However, Gramsci's historicism was an absolute historicism that broke with the Hegelian and idealist tenor of Croce's thinking and its tendency to secure a metaphysical synthesis in historical destiny. Though Gramsci repudiated the charge, his historical account of truth has been criticised as a form of relativism.

=== Critique of economism ===
In a famous pre-prison article entitled "The Revolution against Das Kapital", Gramsci claimed that the October Revolution in Russia had invalidated the idea that socialist revolution had to await the full development of capitalist forces of production. This reflected his view that Marxism was not a determinist philosophy. The principle of the causal primacy of the forces of production, he held, was a misconception of Marxism. Both economic changes and cultural changes are expressions of a basic historical process, and it is difficult to say which sphere has primacy over the other. The fatalistic belief, widespread within the workers' movement in its earliest years, that it would inevitably triumph due to historical laws, was, in Gramsci's view, a product of the historical circumstances of an oppressed class restricted mainly to defensive action, and was to be abandoned as a hindrance once the working-class became able to take the initiative. Because Marxism is a philosophy of praxis, it cannot rely on unseen historical laws as the agents of social change. History is defined by human praxis and therefore includes human will. Nonetheless, will-power cannot achieve anything it likes in any given situation: when the consciousness of the working-class reaches the stage of development necessary for action, historical circumstances will be encountered which cannot be arbitrarily altered. It is not, however, predetermined by historical inevitability as to which of several possible developments will take place as a result.

His critique of economism also extended to that practised by the syndicalists of the Italian trade unions. He believed that many trade unionists had settled for a reformist, gradualist approach in that they had refused to struggle on the political front in addition to the economic front. While Gramsci envisioned the trade unions as one organ of a counter-hegemonic force in capitalist society, the trade union leaders simply saw these organizations as a means to improve conditions within the existing structure. Gramsci referred to the views of these trade unionists as vulgar economism, which he equated to covert reformism and even liberalism.

=== Critique of materialism ===
By virtue of his belief that human history and collective praxis determine whether any philosophical question is meaningful or not, Gramsci's views run contrary to the metaphysical materialism and 'copy' theory of perception advanced by Engels and Lenin, though he does not explicitly state this. For Gramsci, Marxism does not deal with a reality that exists in and for itself, independent of humanity. The concept of an objective universe outside of human history and human praxis was, in his view, analogous to belief in God; there could be no objectivity, but only a universal intersubjectivity to be established in a future communist society. Natural history was thus only meaningful in relation to human history. On his view philosophical materialism, like primitive common sense, resulted from a lack of critical thought, and could not, as Lenin claimed, be said to oppose religious superstition. Despite this, Gramsci resigned himself to the existence of this arguably cruder form of Marxism: the proletariat's status as a dependent class meant that Marxism, as its philosophy, could often only be expressed in the form of popular superstition and common sense. Nonetheless, it was necessary to effectively challenge the ideologies of the educated classes, and to do so Marxists must present their philosophy in a more sophisticated guise, and attempt to genuinely understand their opponents' views.

== Translations ==
There have been different English translations of Prison Notebooks.

- Gramsci, Antonio (1971) [1929–1935]. Hoare, Quintin; Smith, Geoffrey Nowell (eds.). Selections From the Prison Notebooks of Antonio Gramsci (11th printing). International Publishers – via Internet Archive. LCCN 71-168985 (1st ed.), LCCN 72-175271; ISBN 0-7178-0397-X; OCLC 185485941 (all editions).
- Gramsci, Antonio (1991–2011) [1929–1935]. Prison Notebooks [Quaderni del Carcere] (translated eds. – 1991, 1992, 1996, 2007, 2008, 2011 – by Joseph Anthony Buttigieg II; 1947–2019). (3 volumes). Columbia University Press. LCCN 91-22910; ISBN 0-2311-5755-X, 978-0-2311-5755-1 (2011 ed.); OCLC 210400186 (all editions)
1. Vol. 1 (1992 ed.) – via Google Books (limited preview). ISBN 0-2310-6082-3, 978-0-2310-6082-0.
2. Vol. 2 (not available online) (1992 ed.). ISBN 0-2311-0592-4, 978-0-2311-0592-7.
3. Vol. 3 (not available online) (1992 ed.). ISBN 978-0-2311-3944-1.
4. Vol. 3 (2007 ed.). 1992 – via Internet Archive (Trent University). ISBN 978-0-2311-3944-1.

== See also ==
- Organic crisis
- Passive revolution
- Cultural hegemony
- Problems of Everyday Life - Marxist theorist Leon Trotsky's writings on cultural and scientific matters between 1924 and 1939.
