= The Anglo Files =

The Anglo Files: A Field Guide to the British is a book written by Sarah Lyall an American born journalist who is a London correspondent for The New York Times. It was published by W. W. Norton of New York in 2008 (ISBN 9780393058468).
