= Mayoralty of Joe Kernan =

Mayoral tenure in South Bend, Indiana

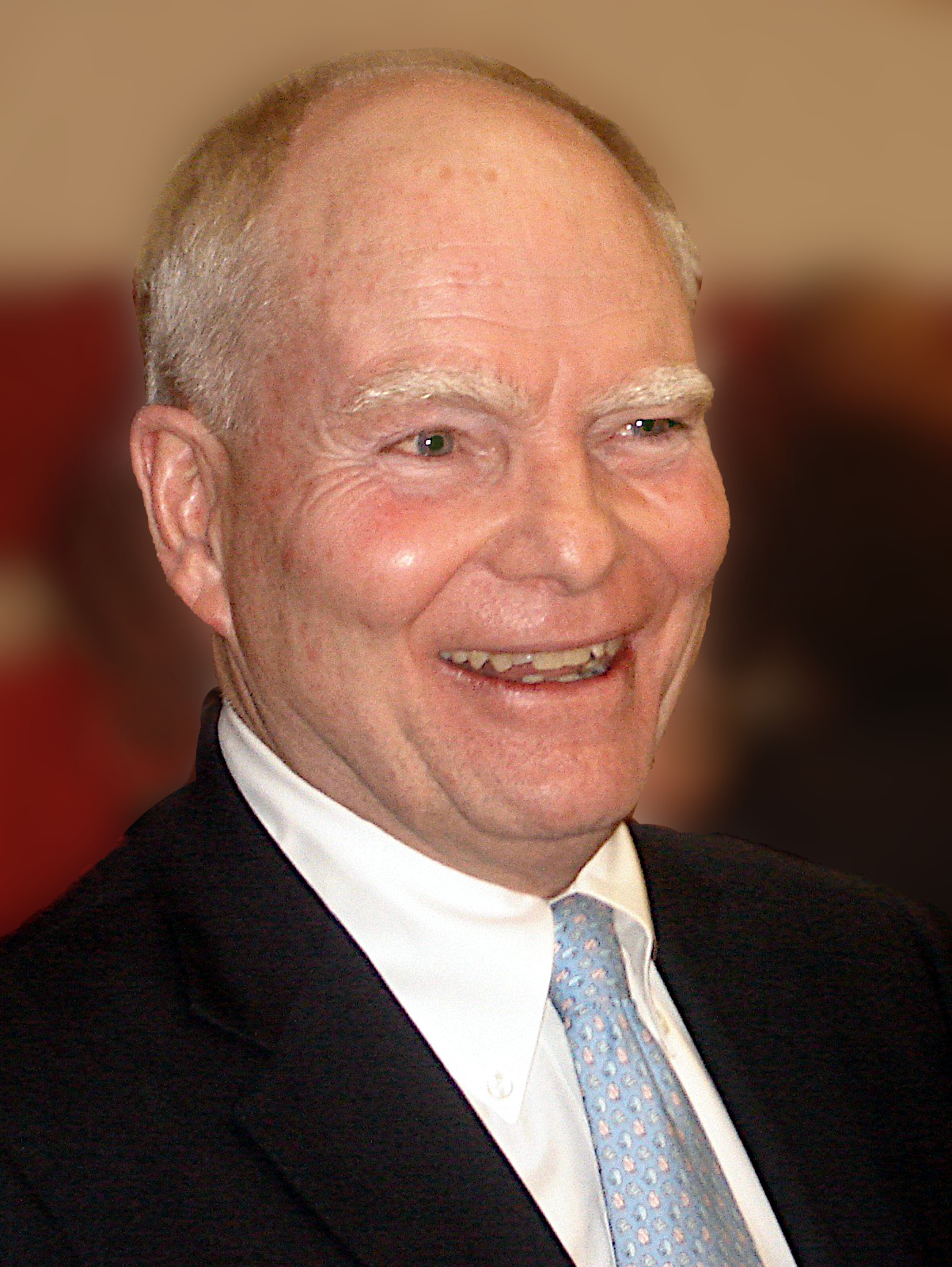
- Kernan, photographed in 2008
- Mayoralty of Joe Kernan; January 3, 1988 – January 3, 1997
- Mayor: Joe Kernan
- Party: Democratic
- Election: 1987; 1991, 1995

Joe Kernan, a member of the Democratic Party, served as mayor of South Bend, Indiana, from January 1988 until January 1997. He was elected to three consecutive terms as mayor as the Democratic nominee in the 1987, 1991 and 1995 mayoral elections. The first mayor since 1905 to win a third term, Kernan's nine-year tenure exceeded all previous South Bend mayoral tenures in length. He remains the city's second-longest serving mayor, with his tenure only surpassed in length by the fifteen-year tenure of his immediate successor, Steve Luecke.

Kernan was regarded to a be a popular mayor, and his third re-election saw him secure a record vote share for the office. He earned praise for his ability to attract major developments to the city, shuch as the College Football Hall of Fame. He was also credited for his efforts to disrupt the city's pattern of job loss, both working to bring new jobs to the city and prevent the loss of existing jobs.

In November 1996, Kernan was elected lieutenant governor of Indiana. He left the mayoralty in January 1997 in order to assume that office. He played an active role in the selection process for his mayoral successor, which resulted in the appointment of Luecke. Kernan later served as governor of Indiana (2003–05).

== Elections ==
=== 1987 election ===
In 1987, incumbent mayor Roger Parent (a Democrat) opted not to run for a third term. Rumors arose that internal polling had shown that, with controversy around the construction of Stanley Coveleski Regional Stadium, Parent would not have been able to win a third term. Several allies of Parent on the Common Council with involvement in the stadium construction would ultimately lose their re-election bids in the May primaries. Kernan ran in the open election to succeed Parent.

Kernan became the Democratic Party nominee for mayor after winning the party's primary, receiving 51% of the vote Kernan's major opponent in the primary was Richard D. Jasinki, an incumbent county commissioner. The campaign for the Democratic nomination was widely viewed as a race between just the two of them, despite several other candidates being on the ballot. The campaigning between Kernan and Jasinki was heated, creating divisions in the local Democratic Party.

Kernan received the endorsement of former mayor Peter Nemeth, who had left office years earlier as a popular mayor. Nemeth had spent the first several years of his post-mayoralty staying out of city politics, breaking this silence in order to give Kernan what was regarded to be a significant endorsement.

While campaigning for the Democratic nomination, Kernan distanced himself from Mayor Parent, whom he had served under as comptroller from 1980 to 1984 (during Parent's first term as mayor). When asked about Parent at a forum, Kernan declared that if elected, "it's going to be Joe Kernan's administration" (as opposed to a continuation of Parent's administration). Kernan also promised that as mayor he would not include Parent in his administration. Additionally, declared that the controversial baseball stadium project that had been championed by Parent as problematic, but stated that, since it had already been built, the city now needed to make the best use of the stadium rather than, "sulk and pout about it for 20 years." Jasinki promised that if he elected, his mayoral leadership would mark "a complete change" from Parent's administration, and argued that a Kernan mayoralty would contrarily offer, "four more years of the same government." Jasinki had also staked out a position opposing any further privatization of city services, while Kernan did not take a firm stance on the issue. Jasinki declined to debate Kernan before the primary.

Jasinksi (of Polish-American descent) had been hoping that his campaign could generate broad turnout and a large number of votes for him in the areas of the city that had been his primary base of support: West Side precincts in neighborhoods with large Polish-American populations. Kernan hoped to counter Jasinksi's ethnic appeal to Polish-American voters by making a public plea for the city to unite apart from any ethnic, racial, or religious divisions.

In the general election, Kernan faced city planner Carl Baxmeyer, the Republican Party nominee. The general election was a close contest, which has been attributed to the fracture the local Democratic Party had suffered as a result of its bitterly-contested mayoral primary. As of 2023, it is the most recent election South Bend mayor to be truly competitive general election. The city had arguably gone for twenty years before 1987 without a competitive mayoral election, with 1967 (in which the city's most recent Republican mayor, Lloyd M. Allen, was last elected) having been arguably been the previous competitive general election. The editorial board of the South Bend Tribune endorsed Kernan, citing his "extensive experience in private business and public service". Ultimately, Kernan defeated Baxmeyer by a mere 2,000 vote margin, winning 53% to 47%.

=== 1991 and 1995 re-elections ===
In 1991, Kernan handily won re-election to a second term, defeating his Republican challenger Sylvia Shelton by 76.5% to 23.5%. In 1995, Kernan won re-election to a third term, winning 82% of the vote, a record vote share for a South Bend mayoral election. This made him the first mayor of the city since 1905 to win election to third term. After being re-elected to his third term, Kernan stated that his priorities as mayor during his third term would be public safety, economic development, and neighborhoods.

== Development ==
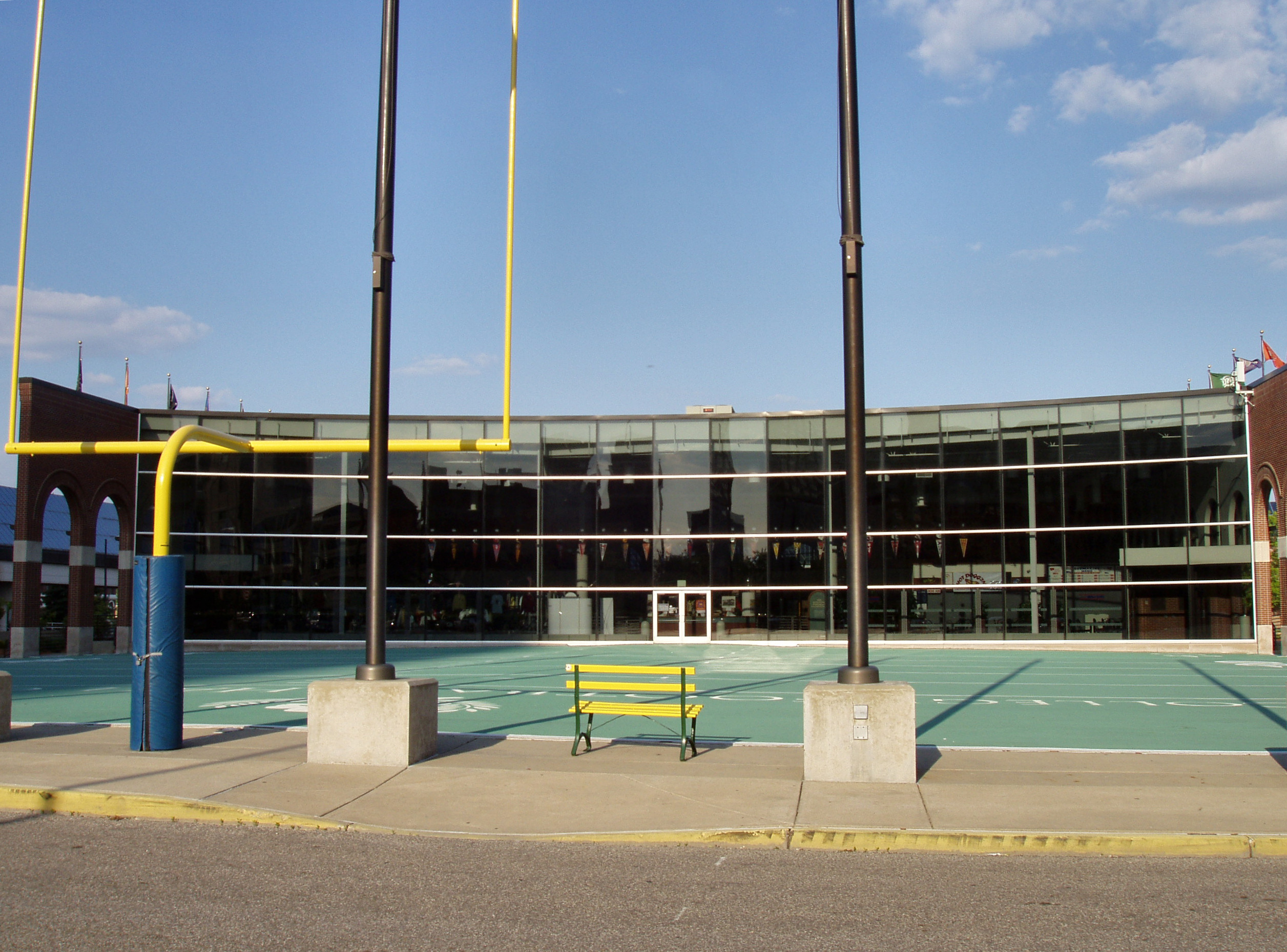
Kernan played a key role in attracting the College Football Hall of Fame to South Bend

At the time he was mayor, Kernan was praised for his ability to attract economic development to the community. Among the major developments he was able to garner South Bend was the securing of the city as the location for the College Football Hall of Fame. Kernan had been instrumental in getting South Bend selected over 89 other cities as the site for the College Football Hall of Fame. Kernan originally pledged that city funds would not go towards the project, and that it would be funded by corporate donations. However, after the city was only able to raise under $2 million in corporate donations, the city issued municipal bonds to pay for the construction.

Among the developments of which Kernan was particularly supportive was the Blackthorn development, a multimillion-dollar golf course and office park development. In 1992, he had touted the concept that became Blackthorn as a "pump for future development." In 1995, defending the ongoing Blackthorn development, he argued that it had added 3,000 jobs and $25 million in investment to the city. In 1995, Kernan took interest in a proposal to build an arena in South Bend for a new minor league ice hockey team. After being approached by an interested minor league ice hockey franchise, Kernan expressed his openness to the idea, and worked to create a committee that would weigh the cost and benefits of such a venture coming to the city. However, this proposal ultimately failed to materialize.

Some of the developments that were initially regarded as successes for South Bend when Kernan was mayor ultimately fell short in the long run. For instance, the College Football Hall of Fame never met its initial attendance projections. By the late-90s, it already had begun to be criticized as a failure, due to a lack of corporate sponsorship and poor turnout even during special events. The Hall of Fame would ultimately leave South Bend for the city of Atlanta in the 2010s. The Blackthorn, particularly its golf course component, fell short of expectations as well. However, Kernan, as late as 2015, defended the Blackthorn development as having, in his own personal view, been a success.

== Job creation and retention ==
As mayor, Kernan worked on long-term job creation efforts, made efforts to improve public safety, and strengthened the finances of the city. In November 1996, Nancy Armour of The Associated Press wrote that Kernan,

Took a city that had lost thousands of factory jobs and helped diversify its economy, attracting new manufacturing as well as corporate jobs.

Kernan worked on long-term job creation efforts as mayor. Kernan came to office shortly after a number of companies had left the city or closed, such as South Bend Toy in 1985 and Wheelbrater-Frye. Kernan took credit for stopping companies like Allied Products' South Bend Stamping from leaving the city. He also took credit for attracting other jobs to the city, arguing that as mayor he had been able to create or retain 4,000 manufacturing jobs. Another example that illustrates Kernan's work in this area was his successful work in 1993 to keep the Hoosier Lottery's 15-employee regional headquarters in South Bend. After they began looking for a new location, eying sites outside of South Bend, Kernan worked directly with them to find a new location for their offices within the city.

== Infrastructure ==
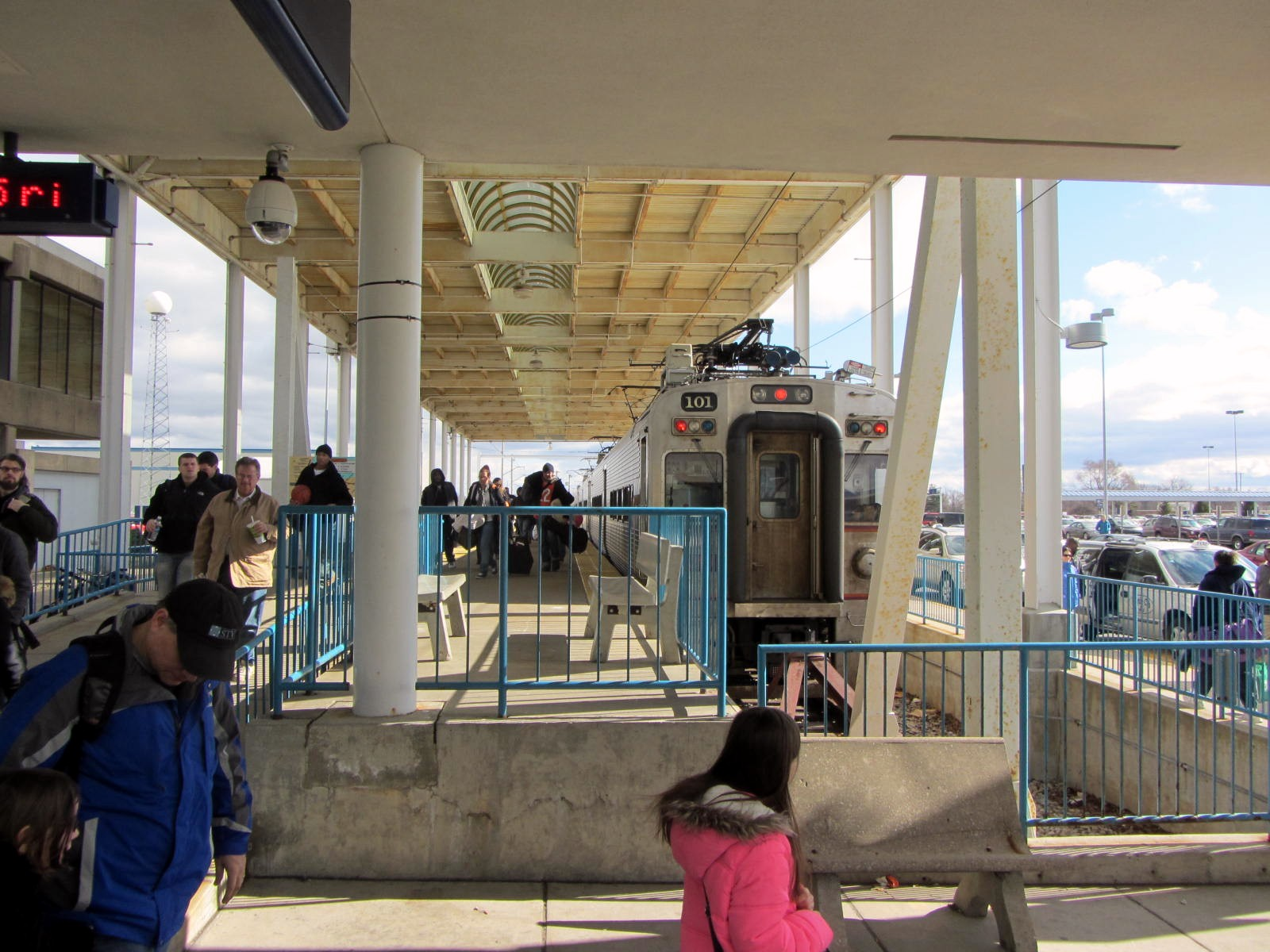
The construction of a new South Shore Line station took place during Kernan's tenure as South Bend mayor

The loss of $20 million annually in federal funds which the city had received prior to Reagan and Bush budget cuts to urban programs had taken its toll on South Bend's infrastructure. Nevertheless, a number of infrastructure projects took place under Kernan's mayoralty.

Among the infrastructure projects that took place during Kernan's tenure as mayor was the shifting of South Bend's South Shore Line station from a facility shared with Amtrak to a new location at the city's airport, which opened in 1992. In 1993, Kernan testified before congress that this move had been partially responsible for a 73% increase in ridership from South Bend, attributing this to the fact that the previous location of the station was in an area, "isolated and very difficult and perceived to be unsafe" Plans to move the South Shore Line station to the airport, creating an air, bus, and rail intermodal terminal, had dated back to the 1970s.

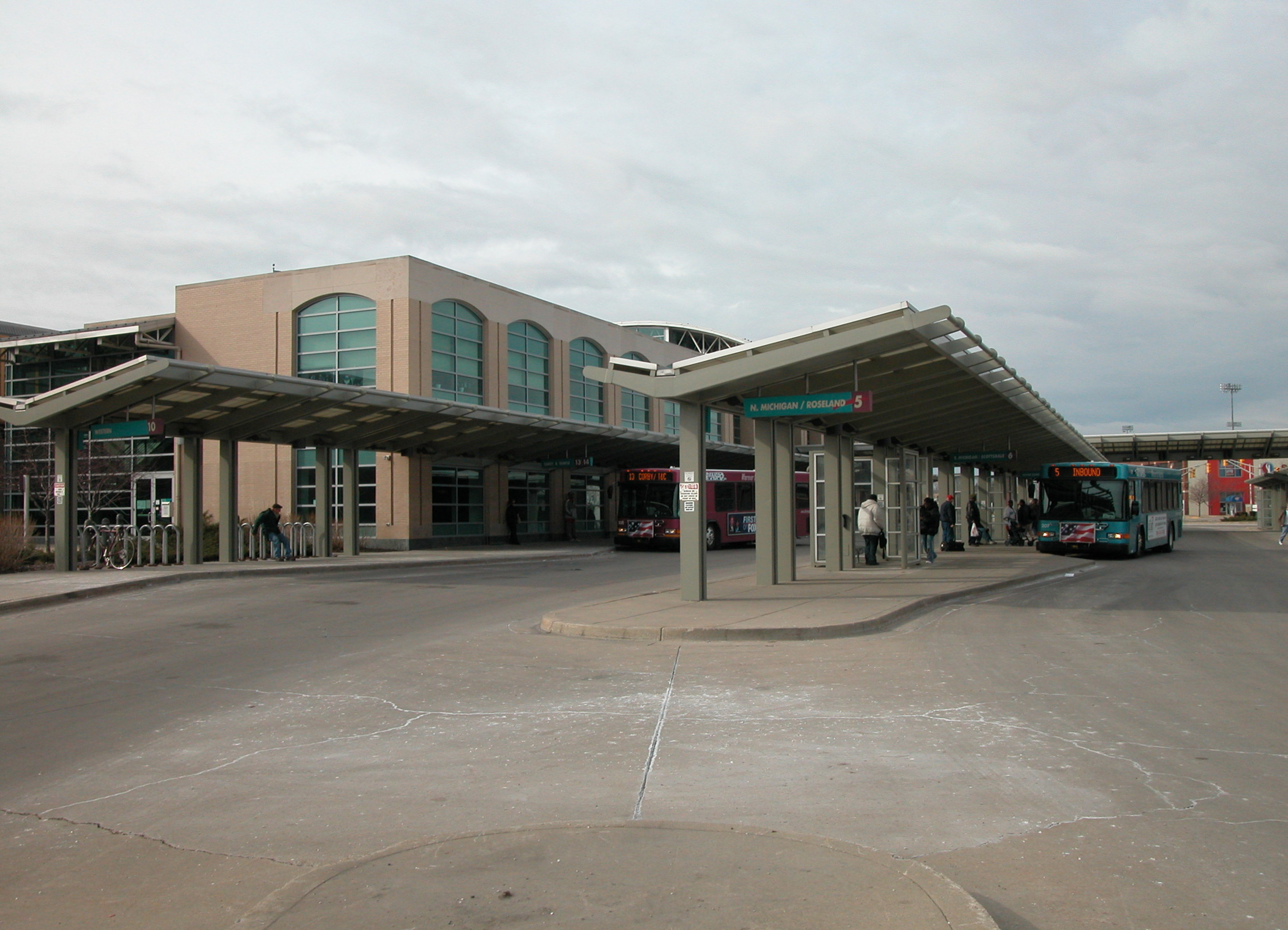
South Street Station, the result of efforts to construct an intermodal transit center which began during Kernan's tenure

In the early 1990s, Kernan expressed hope that the city might be able to successfully negotiate with Amtrak to secure a return of train service to Union Station in the city's downtown, though this did not materialize. In the years thereafter, he and others worked to secure funding for a new intermodal transit center built in Downtown South Bend, which was intended to feature both a new station for Amtrak and a new local bus transit hub for South Bend Transpo. Efforts planning this station date back to 1992. It ultimately opened in 1998, after Kernan's mayoralty had ended, as the South Street Station, but only as a bus center without an Amtrak component.

== Parks and Recreation ==
During Kernan's tenure many changes were made to South Bend's parks. Several new facilities opened, including Blackthorn Golf Course in 1994. In 1993, for the first time, non-reverting funds were established to create money for capital improvements to the parks. Additionally, a City-County parks merger was studied in 1993, but ultimately not implemented. In 1995, South Bend's recreation commission was dissolved, and the Department of Parks took over management of recreation programs and was renamed the Department of Parks and Recreation.

== National politics ==
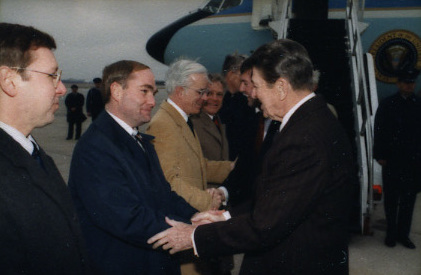
Kernan greeting President Ronald Reagan in 1988

In 1989, Kernan considered, but ruled out, running against Republican Dan Coats for the United States Senate in the 1990 special election for the seat that had been vacated by Dan Quayle upon becoming vice president. While Kernan was considered a strong prospective candidate among the possible Democratic contenders, commentator James Grass observed prior to Kernan making his decision not to run that, "to run a successful campaign," a Democratic nominee would likely need, "statewide name recognition, a good reputation, and the ability to raise lots of money. All the Democrats still considering a candidacy lack at least one of these qualifications."

In 1992, Democratic presidential nominee Bill Clinton proposed a $200 billion ($20 billion annually) plan for infrastructure. Mayor Kernan declared to the media that under Clinton's plan, in which a city of South Bend's size would have received at least $5 million annually, South Bend would have been able to complete critical road construction and complete reclamation on hundreds of acres of former industrial property.

=== Support of the Omnibus Budget Reconciliation Act of 1993 ===
In 1993, Kernan campaigned in support of President Clinton's deficit reduction and economic stimulus proposal. After meeting with Clinton when accompanying Governor Evan Bayh to the Democratic Governors Association quarterly meeting in March 1993, Kernan declared that he had been persuaded by Clinton that it was necessary to pass both deficit reduction and economic stimulus in a singular piece of legislation rather than separating them into separate bills. Kernan declared,

It must be viewed as an entire package. If you begin peeling away pieces, the whole thing will fall apart. Combined it has something for everyone. As a whole, it has great benefit for the country. On balance it is extreme fair.

To promote the legislation to Indiana's federal representatives and their constituents, Kernan pointed to an analysis that had found that Indiana would be one of only five states that would benefit fiscally from the proposal, as Indiana, at the time, had typically received less in federal funding than it contributed in federal taxes. Kernan also touted the prospect of South Bend receiving several million dollars in one-time federal funding through the legislation. He also argued that the stimulus portion of the legislation was needed to generate jobs.

Kernan also argued that it was past time for legislators to cease considering alternative proposals, as several Republican alternative proposals had already been voted down. Kernan remarked, "This is the only game in town. While there may be some folks who disagree with some party of it, it's the only economic package in the country that has a change of passage." He argued that failure to pass the proposal without a viable alternative would worsen federal legislative gridlock and hurt the chances of Clinton achieving his target of implementing a significant economic change.

== City finances ==
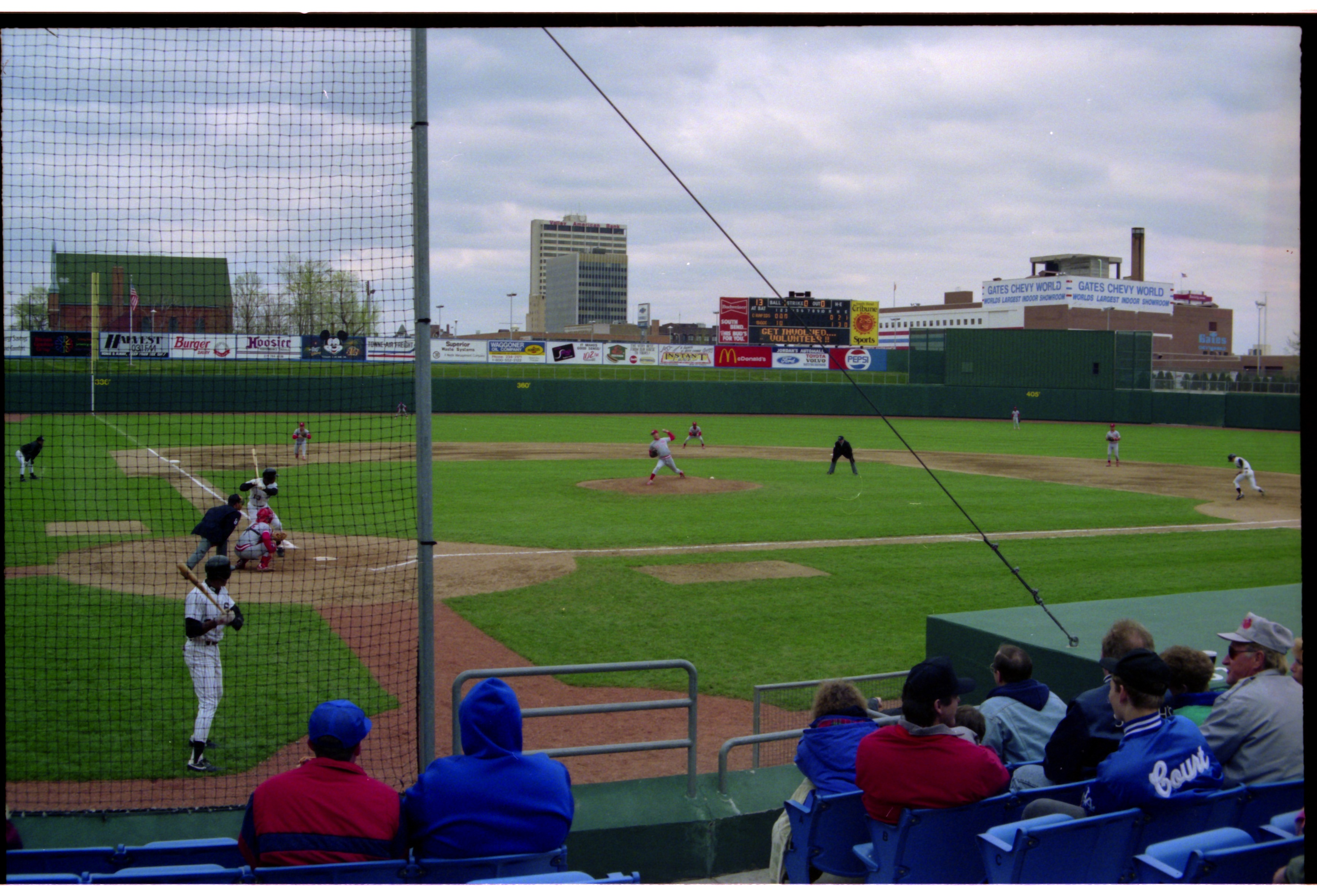
Kernan refinanced Coveleski Stadium

In 1988, taking advantage of a decline in interest rates, Kernan refinanced the city-owned Coveleski Stadium through the newly created South Bend Redevelopment Authority.

By the end of his second term, Kernan positioned himself as an opponent of further privatization in the city. He did not criticize all privatization that had already occurred in the city, but rather stood against further privatization which he argued would result in the, "wholesale auction of the city's assets". South Bend Republicans, contrarily, were generally proponents of further privatization in the city. In 1995, Kernan supported a ballot measure to implement an option tax, arguing that it would provide property tax relief and enable capital improvements.

== Public safety ==
During his 1995 re-election campaign, Kernan argued that he had taken measures as mayor to address crime, such as increasing the size of the city's police force by 34 officers since 1991. He also touted that the rate of violent crime had decreased 19% since the previous year. He conceded, however, that crime was, "the most significant challenge we face in the community". Indicative of the issue of crime, the city had already seen a record murder total in 1995 by the time of the election.

In December 1988, a fire that destroyed the Morningside Club Residence, an apartment hotel, displaced more than a hundred residents. Kernan was able to persuade the then-unopened Center for the Homeless to rush its opening in order to accommodate some of these displaced residents.

== Annexation ==
Kernan commissioned a 1992 study on annexation, the findings of which recommended that the city pursue an ambitious program of annexing surrounding unincorporated areas. The recommended annexation program would have doubled the city's land area. The study cited population growth in surrounding unincorporated areas and population loss within the city over the preceding decades as reason the city would benefit from annexing such areas. The plan proposed annexing most of Clay Township, the Knollwood subdivision, as well as the unincorporated area of Notre Dame.

== Other matters ==
As mayor, Kernan worked to create a better working relationship between the South Bend city government and the nearby University of Notre Dame.

Kernan instituted a mayor's night out/mayor's night in to provide an opportunity for his constituents to better meet with him and share their concerns with him. He held his first such event in January 1988. This practice was also continued under his successor, Steve Luecke.

While mayor, Kernan was involved in the creation of Indiana's Vietnam and Korean War memorials.

== Public opinion ==
Kernan was regarded to be a popular mayor. In November 1996, Nancy Armour of The Associated Press wrote that Kernan was, "well-liked by Democrats and Republicans alike. He's friendly and warm, quick to greet residents by name and ask how they are doing. He's accessible too."

== Election as lieutenant governor, mayoral succession ==
Kernan was elected lieutenant governor of Indiana in November 1996, having been selected as Frank O'Bannon's running-mate on the Democratic gubernatorial election ticket in early June. While campaigning for lieutenant governor, he continued to fulfill his duties as mayor. In part to facilitate this, Kernan operated his end of the campaign out of a separate campaign office from O'Bannon, located in South Bend. He also piloted himself to campaign events on a rented Cessna 172 aircraft. Flying enabled him to return to South Bend more easily than traveling by road would have.

Kernan took office as lieutenant governor in January 1997. In order to take office as lieutenant governor, he resigned as mayor. During the time between his election and swearing-in as lieutenant governor, he had involved himself in guiding the selection of a mayoral successor. He involved St. Joseph Democratic Party chairman Butch Morgan and South Bend City Council president Roland Kelly in the interviewing of prospective successors. By law, his successor was appointed by the city's 120 Democratic Party precinct committeemen and committeewoman, and it was required that a successor be appointed within thirty days of Kernan leaving office as mayor. It was anticipated that Kernan's endorsement would be heeded by them. Kernan ultimately endorsed Steve Luecke to be his successor, and Luecke was thereafter voted unanimously to serve the rest of Kernan's term. Other candidates that had been reportedly considered included St. Joseph County Prosecutor Mike Barnes, Portage Township Assessor John Voorde, St. Joseph County Auditor Joe Nagy, City Councilor Sean Coleman, City Councilor John Hosinski, Carter Wolf, and City Controller Kevin Horton.

== See also ==
- Mayoralty of Pete Buttigieg, a later South Bend mayoralty

Political offices
Preceded by Roger Parent	Mayor of South Bend, Indiana; 1987-1997	Succeeded by Steve Luecke
