= 2019 South Bend mayoral election =

- November 5, 2019
- Turnout: 15%
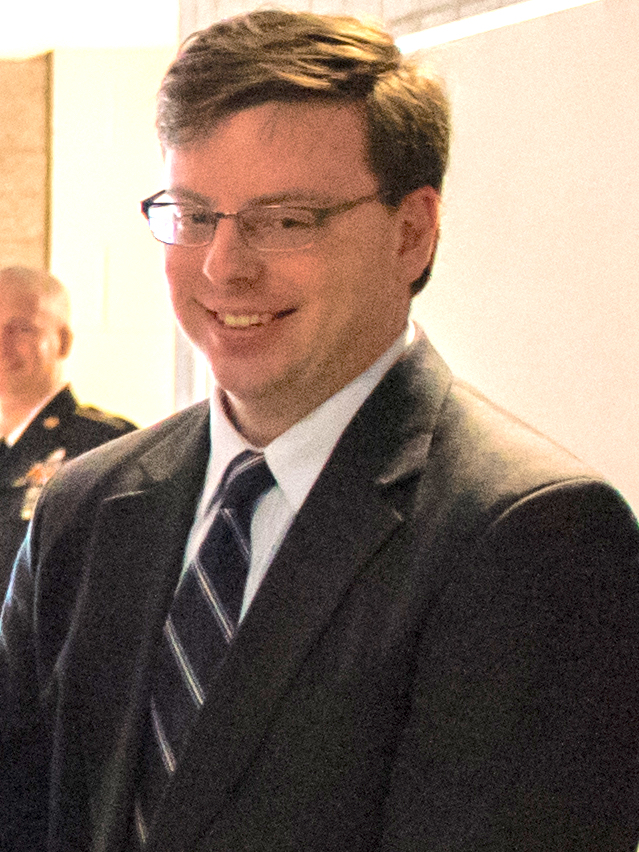

Nominee	James Mueller	Sean M. Haas
Party	Democratic	Republican
Popular vote	9,437	5,445
Percentage	63.41%	36.58%
- Results by Common Council district
Mayor before election
Pete Buttigieg
Democratic
Elected mayor
James Mueller
Democratic

The 2019 South Bend, Indiana mayoral election was held on November 5, 2019, to determine the next mayor of South Bend, Indiana.

On December 17, 2018, incumbent two-term Democratic mayor Pete Buttigieg announced that he would not seek reelection to a third term. Speculation arose that Buttigieg was considering a run for President of the United States, and Buttigieg would later announce his 2020 presidential campaign. The general election race to succeed Buttigieg as mayor was between Democratic nominee James Mueller and Republican nominee Sean M. Haas. Mueller won the election.

The election coincided with races for the Common Council and for South Bend City Clerk.

== Nominations ==
The primaries were held May 7. The filing period for candidates to run in primaries was from January 9 through February 8.

During the primaries, St. Joseph County, where South Bend is located, saw voter turnout of 15.05% in its various primary elections. This was an increase of roughly 3% from the primaries four years prior. This was also greater than the state of Indiana's average of 12.87% voter turnout in counties that were holding 2019 municipal primaries.

Absentee voting ballots in the South Bend primaries numbered at 2,974.

=== Democratic primary ===
Speculation began to arise in early 2017, during Buttigieg's unsuccessful campaign in the Democratic National Committee chairmanship election, that he might not seek reelection, with some speculation even existing that he might resign before the end of his second term. Potential candidates, considering runs if Buttigieg were not to run, began to emerge.

While a quite competitive race, the Democratic primary was rather tame in its character, with very little mudslinging between candidates. In early January, immediately before the filing period for candidates would begin, prospective candidates James Mueller, Jason Critchlow, Lynn Coleman, and Aaron Perri held a meeting in which they agreed that, if they ran, they would try to keep the city's Democratic Party unified.

In February, Buttigieg endorsed candidate James Mueller as his preferred successor. Mueller largely ran a campaign promising to continue the progress made under Buttigieg's mayoralty. Buttigieg appeared in campaign ads for Mueller and even donated to Mueller's campaign. Mueller, a first-time candidate for public office, ultimately won a solid victory in a crowded primary field. Prior to launching his campaign Mueller lacked name recognition. Mueller, followed by Critchlow, was the candidate that led in fundraising.

Mueller was not alone in praising Buttigieg's tenure and promising to build upon it. Critchlow, for one, also praised Buttigieg's leadership and promised to continue the progress made under it.

Candidate Regina Williams-Preston was somewhat critical of the incumbent mayor, being particularly critical of his Vacant & Abandoned Properties Initiative (she had first run for her Common Council seat in 2015 as a strong opponent of the initiative). However, she also offered him praise for making more funds and resources available to low-income residents for the purposes of repairing their homes. Williams-Preston is the daughter of George Williams Jr., who in 1975 ran for the Republican nomination for mayor, the first black man to seek the city's mayoralty.

No ethnic minority has ever been elected mayor of South Bend. This meant that if either Oliver Davis (African American), Shane Inez (Afro-Latin American), Salvador Rodriguez (Hispanic), or Williams-Preston (African American) were elected mayor, they would have been the first ethnic minorities to hold the office. No woman has been mayor of South Bend, thus Williams-Preston would also have been the first female mayor if she had been elected.

On March 5 Indiana University South Bend hosted a debate attended by seven of the candidates for mayor. Further debates and forums were hosted by IU South Bend. A forum was also hosted by the local NAACP.

In the weeks leading up to the primary, Mueller, Critchlow, and Coleman were the three candidates who had the greatest television advertising presence.

==== Candidates ====
- Lynn Coleman, community liaison at Memorial Hospital, former South Bend police officer, former special assistant to mayor Steve Luecke, and Democratic nominee for Indiana's 2nd congressional district in 2016
- Jason Critchlow, senior project manager for a clinical research company and the former chairman of the St. Joseph County Democratic Party
- Oliver Davis, 6th district South Bend City Councilor and vice-president of Common Council, former president of the Common Council
- James Mueller, former chief of staff to mayor Pete Buttigieg and former executive director of community investment for South Bend
- Will Smith, entrepreneur
- Regina Williams-Preston, 2nd District City Councilor and teacher
- Richard O. Wright, Downtown South Bend Ambassador

Withdrawn

- Shane Inez, tribal monarch and political entrepreneur
- Salvador G. Rodriguez

Declined to run

- Pete Buttigieg, incumbent mayor of South Bend, Democratic candidate for President of the United States
- Ryan Dvorak, state representative and 2011 mayoral candidate
- Michael Hamann, St. Joseph County Auditor, former St. Joseph County Council member, and 2011 mayoral candidate
- David L. Niezgodski, state senator and former state representative
- Aaron Perri, South Bend Director of Venues, Parks and Arts and former executive director of Downtown South Bend
- Tim Scott, 1st District South Bend City Councilor and Common Council President

==== Endorsements ====
Lynn Coleman
- Steve Luecke, former Mayor of South Bend
Jason Critchlow

Government officials

- B. Patrick Bauer, State Representative and former Speaker of Indiana House
- Dr Virginia Calvin, former Superintendent of South Bend Community School Corporations
- Sean Coleman, Portage Township Trustee and former South Bend Councilman
- Mike Dvorak, former St. Joseph County Prosecutor and former State Representative
- Ryan Dvorak, State Representative and candidate for mayor in 2011
- Diana Hess St. Joseph County Concilwoman
- Joe E. Kernan, former Governor of Indiana, former Lieutenant Governor of Indiana, former Mayor of South Bend, and former Comptroller of South Bend
- Karl King, former South Bend Councilman
- Al "Buddy" Kirsits, former South Bend City Councilman
- Mike Kruk, St. Joseph County Treasurer
- Rosemary Mandricim, St. Joseph County Assessor
- Bob McCahill, former St. Joseph County Council
- Jerry Miller, former Mayor of South Bend
- Pete Mullen, former St. Joseph County Auditor
- Corey Noland, St. Joseph County Councilman
- Roger Parent, former Mayor of South Bend
- Bill Redman, County Sheriff
- Dave Thomas, St. Josesph County Commissioner
- John Voorde, South Bend City Councilman; former South Bend City Clerk

Individuals

- Patrick Shelton, community activist
- Greg Chavez, Community Activist
- Brendan Mullen, former congressional candidate
- Salvador Rodriguez, former mayoral candidate

Trade unions

- International Brotherhood of Electrical Workers Local 153
- International Union of Operating Engineers Local 150
- Ironworkers Local 292
- Plumbers & Pipefitters Local 172
- Sheetmetal Workers Local 20 (International Association of Sheet Metal, Air, Rail and Transportation Workers)
- South Bend Fraternal Order of Police #36
- United Steelworkers 9231

Newspapers

- South Bend Tribune
James Mueller
- Pete Buttigieg, incumbent mayor
- Kareemah Fowler, South Bend City Clerk
- David Niezgodski, Indiana State Senator
- Laura O'Sullivan, Chief of Staff to mayor Pete Buttigieg
Regina Williams-Preston

Individuals

- April Lidinsky, community activist
- Shane Inez, entrepreneur and former candidate for mayor
- Marguerite Taylor, community activist

Trade unions

- IUE-CWA Local 809

==== Results ====
Democratic primary results
Party	Candidate	Votes	%
Democratic	James Mueller	4,447	37.37
Democratic	Jason Critchlow	3,081	25.89
Democratic	Lynn Coleman	2,701	22.70
Democratic	Regina Williams-Preston	876	7.36
Democratic	Oliver Davis	723	6.08
Democratic	Salvador Rodriguez	23	0.19
Democratic	Will Smith	18	0.15
Democratic	Shane Inez	16	0.13
Democratic	Richard Wright	15	0.13
Total votes		11,900	100

Results by district Mueller Coleman

Mueller placed first in Districts 1, 3, 4, and 5. Coleman placed first in Districts 2 and 6. The two districts where a plurality of the vote was carried by Coleman are the city's only majority-minority districts.

Two Common Council members running for mayor failed to carry their own districts, with Regina Williams-Preston winning only 119 votes in the 2nd district (finishing 5th-place there) and Oliver Davis winning only 138 votes in the 6th district (finishing 4th-place there).

Results by district
District	Coleman		Critchlow		Mueller		Others		Total
District	Votes	%	Votes	%	Votes	%	Votes	%	Total
1	660	27.95%	473	20.03%	851	36.04%	337	14.27%	2,361
2	731	47.01%	247	15.88%	260	16.72%	317	20.39%	1,555
3	262	15.47%	456	26.92%	734	43.33%	242	14.29%	1,694
4	387	13.80%	679	24.22%	1,399	49.89%	339	12.09%	2,804
5	335	14.29%	857	36.55%	946	40.34%	207	8.83%	2,345
6	414	33.91%	366	29.98%	244	19.98%	197	16.13%	1,221

Out of 87 voting precincts, Mueller won 41, Coleman won 22, and Critchlow won 17.

=== Republican primary ===
Sean M. Haas ran unopposed for the Republican nomination.

With a turnout of 908 voters, the Republican primary is the second-lowest Republican primary turnout in modern South Bend mayoral election history.

==== Results ====
Republican primary results
Party	Candidate	Votes	%
Republican	Sean M. Haas	908	100
Total votes		908	100

== General election ==
Mueller continued to campaign upon promising to continue the progress made under Buttigieg's tenure. One of the themes of a general ad campaign by Mueller was "Working with Pete". In contrast, Haas criticized Buttigieg and adopted the campaign catch-phase "No RePetes" (a play on the word "repeats"). Haas called for the resignation of mayor Buttigieg due to his extended absence from the city during his presidential candidacy.

The Republican Party had not been successful in South Bend mayoral elections in decades. Haas did not entirely embrace the identity of the party he was nominated by, declaring that he was more of a "centrist" than a Republican. He openly admitted to not having voted in party primaries in years, and also had admitted that he voted for Democrat Barack Obama in the 2008 presidential election. He also stated that in the 2016 presidential election he "probably" voted for a third party candidate, but was not able to recall.

Haas at one point declared himself to be "pro-life" on the issue of abortion, but later stated that he that believes that abortion should be, “safe, legal, and rare," but that, in the years since Roe v. Wade, he believes abortion, "hasn't been rare enough".

Both candidates were in favor of retaining the city identification card program that had already been launched.

Each candidate had laid out plans to address crime and public safety in the city. Mueller outlined 32 actionable items categorized into four groups. The four categories of Mueller's plans were reducing violence; recruiting and retaining a diverse police force; building more relationships through community policing and improving resident participation; and officer training and policies. Key components of Mueller's plan included expanding the Group Violence Intervention program, establishing a summer youth jobs program, creating a community advisory board, and collaborating with Mishawaka and St. Joseph County leaders to incorporate the existing metro homicide unit into a “major crimes unit". Haas stated that his public safety plans started with a focus on "building relationships" between the community and its police force. Haas stated that he would also seek more "micro-community policing", under which officers create specially designed crime-fighting plans for specific areas of the city. Haas also desired to revive Drug Abuse Resistance Education programs in South Bend schools. Haas also had promised to add 50 or more officers to the city's police force. Mueller had disagreed with Haas' proposal to budget for more police officers, arguing that, while Haas had claimed that there are only 210 police on the streets of the city, the city is budgeted for a police force of 240 officers, a ratio of 2.36 officers per every 1,000 residents. Mueller claimed that this ratio outranks those of Indianapolis, Elkhart, and Mishawaka.

Haas had proposed reforming the city's Board of Public Safety to have, in addition to the three members appointed by the mayor, four additional members. One additional member to be an elected judge and the other three would be elected to the board by the city's voters.

Mueller's campaign also placed an emphasis on racial justice reform, with Mueller arguing that there needed to be community wide changes as well as changes within the police department to achieve this.

The sole debate between the two candidates was held October 1 at Indiana University South Bend. During the debate, Haas denied that systemic racism exists. Those comments drew criticism.

=== Endorsements ===
Sean M. Haas (R)

Organizations

- South Bend Fraternal Order of Police
James Mueller (D)

Officeholders

- Pete Buttigieg, incumbent mayor
- Kareemah Fowler, former South Bend City Clerk
- David Niezgodski, Indiana State Senator

Newspapers

- South Bend Tribune

==== Results ====
Turnout among registered voters was approximately 15%, up 1% from the previous mayoral election.

Vote totals were 14,882. This was below the average of vote totals for South Bend mayoral elections since 1999, which was 15,826. The vote total, however, would rank at the median among South Bend mayoral elections since 1999.

Mueller's victory marked the 13th straight South Bend mayoral election in which a Democrat has won. The last South Bend mayoral election won by a Republican was in 1967. Democrats have won all South Bend mayoral elections since 1971.

Mueller carried four of the city's five districts. Haas carried the city's 5th district (winning 51% of the vote there) The 5th district has some strongly Republican precincts, and for decades has been represented on South Bend's common council by a Republican (being the city's only district represented by a Republican ever since 1991).

Mueller performed strongest in majority-minority neighborhoods. The 2nd and 6th districts are the city's only majority non-white districts. In the combined vote of these two districts, Mueller enjoyed 68% of the vote.

General election results
Party	Candidate	Votes	%
Democratic	James Mueller	9,437	63.41
Republican	Sean M. Haas	5,445	36.58
Total votes		14,882	100
