= List of mayors of South Bend, Indiana =

Mayor of South Bend
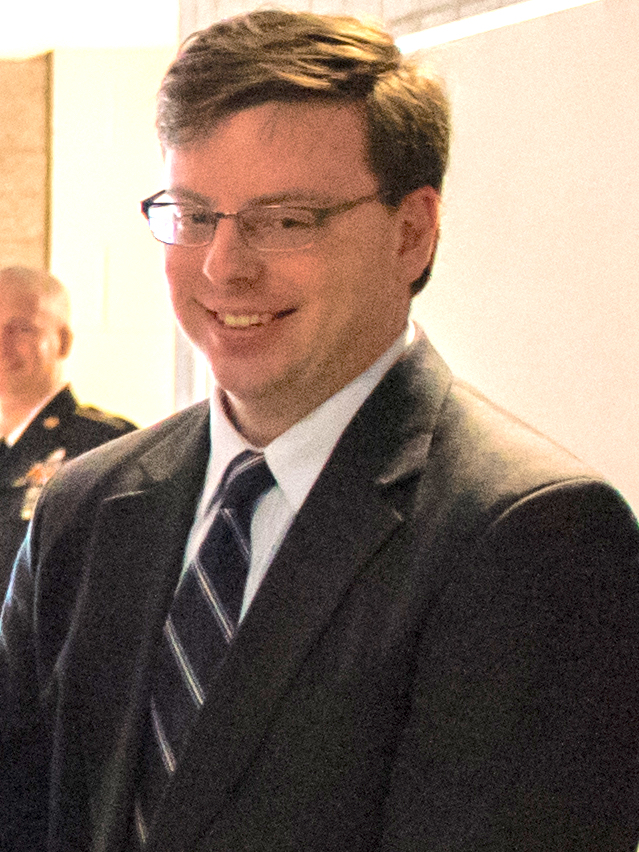
- Incumbent; James Mueller since January 1, 2020
- Style: The Honorable, Mr. Mayor (informal)
- Term length: Four-year term, renewable
- Formation: May 22, 1865
- Salary: $117,780.24 (2020)

This is a list of mayors of South Bend, Indiana, beginning with South Bend's incorporation as a city on May 22, 1865. William G. George served as the city's first mayor from 1865 to 1868. Joe Kernan was mayor of South Bend from 1988 to 1997 and went on to serve as governor of Indiana. South Bend's 11th mayor was Schuyler Colfax III, son of the 17th Vice President of the United States Schuyler Colfax, and was the youngest mayor of South Bend. Every mayor since 1972 has been a Democrat and the incumbent is James Mueller, having taken office on January 1, 2020.

== List of mayors ==
No.	Mayor	Took office	Left office	Tenure	Party	Election
1	William G. George (TBA–TBA)	1865	1868	3 years	Republican	TBA
2	Louis Humphreys (1816–1880)	1868	1872	4 years	Republican	TBA
3	William Miller (1821–1901)	1873	1876	3 years	Republican	TBA
4	Alexander N. Thomas (TBA–TBA)	1877	1878	1 year	Republican	TBA
5	Lucius G. Tong (1842–1908)	1878	1880	2 years	Republican	TBA
6	Levi J. Ham (1805–1887)	1880	1884	4 years	Democratic	TBA
7	George W. Loughman (1846–1909)	1884	1888	4 years	Republican	TBA
8	William H. Longley (TBA–TBA)	1888	1892	4 years	Democratic	TBA
9	David R. Leeper (1832–1900)	1892	1894	2 years	Democratic	TBA
10	D. B. J. Schafer (TBA–TBA)	1894	1898	4 years	Republican	TBA
11	Schuyler Colfax III (1870–1925)	1898	1902	4 years	Republican	TBA
12	Edward J. Fogarty (TBA–TBA)	1902	1910	8 years	Democratic	TBA
13	Charles L. Goetz (TBA–TBA)	1910	1914	4 years	Democratic	TBA
14	Fred W. Keller (1893–1955)	1914	1918	4 years	Independent	TBA
15	Franklin R. Carson (1861–1929)	January 1918	1922	4 years	Republican	TBA
16	Eli F. Seebirt (1879–1955)	1922	1926	4 years	Republican	TBA
17	Chester R. Montgomery (TBA–TBA)	1926	1930	4 years	Democratic	TBA
18	William Riley Hinkle (1874–1964)	1930	1935	5 years	Democratic	TBA
19	George W. Freyermuth (1868–1958)	1935	1938	3 years	Republican	TBA
20	Jesse I. Pavey (TBA–TBA)	1938	1945	7 years	Democratic	TBA
21	F. Kenneth Dempsey (1906–1973)	1945	1947	2 years	Democratic	TBA
22	George A. Schock (TBA–TBA)	1947	1952	5 years	Democratic	TBA
23	John Alden Scott (1916–1986)	1952	1956	4 years	Republican	TBA
24	Edward F. Voorde (1910–1960)	January 1, 1956	September 2, 1960 (Note: Died in office.)	4 years, 245 days	Democratic	TBA
25	Frank J. Bruggner (1891–1972)	September 1960	1964	3 years, 3 months	Democratic	TBA
26	Lloyd M. Allen (1919–1989)	1964	1972	8 years	Republican	1963
26	Lloyd M. Allen (1919–1989)	1964	1972	8 years	Republican	1967
27	Jerry Miller (TBA–TBA)	1972	1975	3 years	Democratic	1971
28	Peter Nemeth (born 1941/2)	1976	1980	4 years	Democratic	1975
29	Roger Parent (born 1938)	January 1980	January 3, 1988	8 years	Democratic	1979
29	Roger Parent (born 1938)	January 1980	January 3, 1988	8 years	Democratic	1983
30	Joe Kernan (1946–2020)	January 3, 1988	January 3, 1997 (Note: Kernan left office after running successfully for Lieutenant Governor of Indiana.)	9 years, 0 days	Democratic	1987
30	Joe Kernan (1946–2020)	January 3, 1988	January 3, 1997	9 years, 0 days	Democratic	1991
30	Joe Kernan (1946–2020)	January 3, 1988	January 3, 1997	9 years, 0 days	Democratic	1995
31	Steve Luecke (born 1950)	January 3, 1997	January 1, 2012	14 years, 363 days	Democratic	App.
31	Steve Luecke (born 1950)	January 3, 1997	January 1, 2012	14 years, 363 days	Democratic	1999
31	Steve Luecke (born 1950)	January 3, 1997	January 1, 2012	14 years, 363 days	Democratic	2003
31	Steve Luecke (born 1950)	January 3, 1997	January 1, 2012	14 years, 363 days	Democratic	2007
32	Pete Buttigieg (born 1982)	January 1, 2012	January 1, 2020	8 years, 0 days	Democratic	2011
32	Pete Buttigieg (born 1982)	January 1, 2012	January 1, 2020	8 years, 0 days	Democratic	2015
33	James Mueller (born 1982)	January 1, 2020	Incumbent	6 years, 249 days	Democratic	2019
33	James Mueller (born 1982)	January 1, 2020	Incumbent	6 years, 249 days	Democratic	2023

== See also ==
- Mayoral elections in South Bend, Indiana
