= Roger Parent =

Roger Parent may refer to:

- Roger Parent (Canadian politician) (1953–2016), former MLA in Saskatchewan
- Roger Parent (mayor), former mayor of South Bend, Indiana
