= Peter Nemeth =

American politician

28th Mayor of South Bend
- In office 1976–1980
- Preceded by: Jerry Miller
- Succeeded by: Roger Parent

Personal details
- Born: 1941 or 1942
- Party: Democratic

Peter J. Nemeth is an American politician and judge who served as the 28th mayor of South Bend, Indiana.

== Early life ==
Nemeth graduated from St. Joseph's High School in South Bend in 1959.

== City councilman ==
Nemeth served as a member of the South Bend Common Council.

== Mayoralty ==
Nemeth was elected mayor of South Bend in 1975.

In 1977, Century Center was opened. In the summer of 1977, Nemeth was able to secure $528,000 in Economic Development Administration funds for the construction of a lighted parking lot near Century Center and improvements to nearby Island Park.

Among the projects Nemeth championed was the East Race Waterway, which was later funded and constructed during his successor Roger Parent's tenure. Along with others, Nemeth fought to prevent the ceasing of South Shore Line passenger service when Chesapeake and Ohio Railway was looking at ending the service. In 1979, the city sold-off its Union Station.

Nemeth did not seek re-election in 1979, and was succeeded as mayor by Roger Parent. Nemeth left office as a popular mayor. He stayed out of politics for the next seven years, breaking this to endorse Joe Kernan's (ultimately successful) candidacy ahead of the Democratic primary of the 1987 mayoral election. This was regarded to be an important endorsement for Kernan in the hotly-contested primary.

== Deputy prosecutor ==
Nemeth served as a deputy prosecutor.

== Judicial career ==
For twenty years from 1993 until 2013, Peter Nemeth served as the judge/probate commissioner on the St. Joseph Probate Court.

Nemeth had been appointed to the judgeship in 1993 by governor Evan Bayh to fill out Nemeth's father's term.

Nemeth played a role in the establishment of St. Joseph County's Juvenile Justice Center.

In 2007 a court-ordered audit of the Indianapolis Juvenile Correctional Facility found numerous deficiencies and rated it as "not satisfactory" or "needs improvement" in 13 of 27 areas reviewed. On December 17, 2007, Nemeth informed governor Mitch Daniels that he would refuse to send female juvenile offenders to the facility, declaring it understaffed and that it was "neither safe nor productive" to send girls to the Indianapolis facility.

In early 2012, Nemeth announced he would forgo seeking reelection to another term as a judge. Jim Fox was elected to succeed him in the judgeship.

In December 2012, a month before his retirement as a judge Nemeth agreed to a sanction from the Judicial Qualifications Commission (JQC), which required him resigning from the St. Joseph County Probate Court bench. In August 2012, the Judicial Qualifications Commission had filed a misconduct charge against him, alleging that he violated the code of judicial conduct in a 2011 guardianship hearing when he suggested that it was inappropriate for taxpayers to pay for a sign language interpreter for a woman seeking custody of a deaf teenager because she, "hadn't paid taxes for several years." Similarly his father was removed for making racist comments from the bench. At the time of his announcement not seek re-election, he was the subject of several pending complaints with Indiana Supreme Court JQC that were ceased by the agreement. His courtroom not only oversaw matters of juvenile justice but of heard all sealed cases of adoption, termination of parental rights, and then name changes of the wards. Those records were maintained on the Quest computer system used only by the JJC court and which are not accessible to the public, adopted children years later, or the numerous parents or grandparents, who lost their children. Grandparents in Indiana have no rights, and he enforced those denials without hesitation or expressing any personal concerns, which was often his practice as a former politician turned state court judge.
