= Mayoral elections in South Bend, Indiana =

Mayoral elections are held in South Bend, Indiana for the city's mayor every four years in the year immediately preceding that of United States presidential elections. South Bend held its first mayoral election in 1865, the year in which the city was incorporated (electing William G. George, its first mayor). This first mayoral election took place in early June 1865, only two weeks after the formal incorporation of the city.

== 1963 ==
1963 South Bend mayoral election
- November 5, 1963
Nominee	Lloyd M. Allen	Paul Krueper
Party	Republican	Democratic
Mayor before election
Frank J. Bruggner
Democratic
Elected mayor
Lloyd M. Allen
Republican

The 1963 South Bend, Indiana mayoral election was held on November 5, 1963. It saw the election of Republican nominee Lloyd M. Allen.

Incumbent Democrat Frank J. Bruggner, who had reluctantly assumed the office after Edward F. Voorde's death in an automobile accident, did not seek reelection to the office.

This is the last time that a non-incumbent Republican won a South Bend mayoral election.

=== Primaries ===
==== Democratic primary ====
Two candidates faced each other in the Democratic primary. Paul Krueper was favored by voters on the East Side and had the support of the Democratic establishment. However, Eugene Pajakowki was favored by voters on the West Side, which had a significant Polish-American vote at the time. The South Bend Tribune's political writer at the time, James Carroll, described the primary the two men waged as being, "one of the meanest in Democratic history". Krueper prevailed in the primary, but the ugliness of the primary had split the party. The party largely split along geographic lines, the city's East Side versus its West Side.

==== Republican primary ====
City Judge Lloyd M. Allen won a large victory in the Republican primary, which saw sizable turnout.

=== General election ===
While a Democratic city, at the time, South Bend was more competitive in its mayoral elections than it is today. A Republican had last won a mayoral election in 1951, and one had come close in the narrow 1955 election (losing a close race to Edward F. Voorde).

The election took place in the direct aftermath of the announcement that Studebaker, a major South Bend employer, would be closing its operations in the city.

Allen criticized the incumbent Democratic-run city administration for the poor condition of the city's streets, and promised that, if elected, he would institute a massive program to repave the city's roads. Allen also campaigned in areas of West Side that were Democratic strongholds and had typically been neglected by Republican candidates.

Allen won a landslide victory. and picked up 5 of the city's 6 districts. Allen's victory has been attributed to the split in the Democratic party following its fractious primary.

== 1967 ==
1967 South Bend mayoral election
- November 7, 1967
Nominee	Lloyd M. Allen	Eugene Pajakowki
Party	Republican	Democratic
Percentage	58%	36%
Mayor before election
Lloyd M. Allen
Republican
Elected mayor
Lloyd M. Allen
Republican

The 1967 South Bend, Indiana mayoral election was held on November 7, 1967. It saw the reelection of incumbent Republican Lloyd M. Allen.

This is the last time that a Republican has won a South Bend mayoral election.

=== Nominations ===
Republicans re-nominated incumbent mayor Lloyd M. Allen.

Democrats nominated Eugene Pajakowki, who had unsuccessfully sought their nomination four years earlier.

Two independent candidates were also running.

=== General election ===
While, during his first term, Allen had received some criticism (including from some prominent city Republicans) for the amount of spending his government had undertaken, despite the city having just lost the major employer Studebaker. Allen defended his spending by declaring that citizens were okay with paying for necessary improvements, so long as they saw actual results.

Allen was endorsed for reelection by The South Bend Reformer newspaper.

Allen won a strong reelection, winning by a 10,500 vote margin. Allen received strong support from the city's African American wards. Allen even received a surprising number of votes in the heavily-Democratic 2nd and 6th wards.

1967 South Bend mayoral election
Party	Candidate	Votes	%
Republican	Lloyd M. Allen (incumbent)		58%
Democratic	Eugene Pajakowki		36%
Independent	Others		6%

Allen's victory had an arguable coattail effect, with Republican City Clerk nominee Cecil Blough winning his race.

== 1971 ==
1971 South Bend mayoral election
- November 2, 1971
Nominee	Jerry Miller	Janet Allen
Party	Democratic	Republican
Mayor before election
Lloyd M. Allen
Republican
Elected mayor
Jerry Miller
Democratic

The 1971 South Bend, Indiana mayoral election was held on November 2, 1971. The election was won by Democratic nominee Jerry Miller.

Incumbent Republican mayor Lloyd M. Allen opted against running for a third term.

This election ushered in an era of continuous Democratic control of the mayor's office in South Bend, which continues to this day.

=== Nominations ===
==== Democratic primary ====
Democrats nominated Jerry Miller, a St. Joseph County Commissioner who had served as President of the County Commissioners.

==== Republican primary ====
Republicans nominated Common Council member Janet Allen (of no familial relation to then-incumbent mayor Lloyd M. Allen). Janet Allen was a conservative Republican who had regularly clashed with the more moderate Republican Lloyd M. Allen during his mayoralty, criticizing him on spending and taxes. Janet Allen had been the first woman ever elected to the South Bend Common Council when she was elected in 1963.

The Republican primary had been a divisive one, with a battle being waged between the cities moderate and conservative Republican Party wings.

=== General election ===
The Republican Party remained divided after its primary.

Janet Allen would have been the first woman to be elected mayor of South Bend had she won the election. As of 2019, no woman has been elected mayor of South Bend.

Jerry Miller had previously been on a study commission to examine a restructuring of the St. Joseph County and South Bend governments. Carrying some of the ideas he had adopted support for during his role on this study commission, Miller campaigned as a proponent of implementing a cabinet form of governance to South Bend's mayor's office Once elected, Miller successfully would re-organize the mayorship. In what was the largest restructuring of a local government in Indiana since Indianapolis' Unigov, the Indiana State Legislature passed legislation authorizing South Bend to restructure its government as such, and South Bend passed legislation to do so, reorganizing many governmental entities into six departments with heads appointed by the mayor.

Miller defeated allen by roughly 10,500 votes, nearly identical to the margin by which Republican Lloyd M. Allen won in the 1967 election. Over 48,000 people voted.

== 1975 ==
1975 South Bend mayoral election
- November 4, 1975
Nominee	Peter Nemeth	John Slafkosky
Party	Democratic	Republican
Popular vote	23,689	9,804
Percentage	68.89%	28.51%
Mayor before election
Jerry Miller
Democratic
Elected mayor
Peter Nemeth
Democratic

The 1975 South Bend, Indiana mayoral election was held on November 4, 1975. The election was won by Democratic nominee Peter Nemeth, who had unseated the incumbent Democratic mayor, Jerry Miller, in the party's primary.

=== Nominations ===
==== Democratic primary ====
Democratic incumbent Jerry Miller was unseated in the primary, being defeated by common council member Peter Nemeth. Nemeth's victory was considered an upset.

In the municipal Democratic primaries, 27,330 votes were cast, which set a record high for a South Bend municipal primary.

==== Republican primary ====
John Slafkosky won the Republican nomination.

Also seeking the Republican nomination was George Williams Jr. Williams was the first black man to run for mayor of South Bend. Williams was a community organizer.

==== Independent candidates ====
Ronald R. Kronewittier ran as an independent candidate.

=== General election ===
Due to the strength of the Democratic Party, his upset primary victory, and his popularity as a common council member, Nemeth was favored to win. He ultimately won a landslide victory.

1975 South Bend mayoral election
Party	Candidate	Votes	%
Democratic	Peter Nemeth	23,689	68.89
Republican	John Slafkosky	9,804	28.51
Independent	Ronald R. Kronewittier	893	2.60
Turnout		34,386	100

== 1979 ==
1979 South Bend mayoral election
- November 6, 1979
Nominee	Roger Parent	Chris Overgaard
Party	Democratic	Republican
Mayor before election
Peter Nemeth
Democratic
Elected mayor
Roger Parent
Democratic

The 1979 South Bend, Indiana mayoral election was held on November 6, 1979. It saw the election Democratic nominee Roger Parent.

=== Nominations ===
Primary elections were held May 8.

==== Democratic primary ====
Roger Parent won the Democratic primary.

Parent won roughly 6,500 votes. The runner-up was St. Joseph County engineer William J. Richardson, who lost to Parent by a roughly 800 vote margin. Third-place finisher was George E. Herendeen, who had roughly 1,400 fewer votes than Parent had received. Fourth place finisher was Mary Chris Adams, who received roughly 1,800 fewer votes than Parent had received.

Parent had been the front-runner since launching his campaign. His strategy placed strong hoes on winning the vote in his own city council district.

==== Republican primary ====
H. Chris Overgaard was unopposed in the Republican mayoral primary, receiving roughly only 2,100 votes, which was described by Jack Colwell of the South Bend Tribune as a record-low for the number of votes to be cast in a South Bend mayoral Republican primary in "modern political history". In fact, at only 2,264, the turnout in the city's overall Republican primaries were also described as a record-low for modern-time Republican municipal primaries in the city.

=== General election ===
the city saw its lowest turnout for a mayoral election since 1925. 29,196 votes were cast.

Parent won by a roughly 2–1 margin over Republican H. Chris Overgaard.

Immediately after the Democratic primary, all of Parent's three largest opponents gave him their support for the general election.

== 1983 ==
1983 South Bend mayoral election
- November 8, 1983
- Turnout: 62%
Nominee	Roger Parent	Howard Goodhew
Party	Democratic	Republican
Popular vote	20,734	11,995
Percentage	61.54%	35.70%
Mayor before election
Roger Parent
Democratic
Elected mayor
Roger Parent
Democratic

The 1983 South Bend, Indiana mayoral election was held on November 8, 1983. It saw the reelection of incumbent Democrat Roger Parent.

=== Nominations ===
Primary elections were held on May 3.

==== Democratic primary ====
Democrats renominated incumbent mayor Roger Parent.

==== Republican primary ====
Republicans nominated businessman Howeard Hoodhew. Goodhew defeated school board member Oscar Brookins.

==== American party nomination ====
The American Party nominated Kathryn Brookins, wife of failed Republican primary contender Oscar Brookins.

=== General election ===
At 62%, turnout, while showing an increase over that of the previous mayoral election, was not considered all that high.

Many local Republicans saw Goodhew as presenting the party with its best chances of winning the mayoralty since Lloyd M. Allen left office.

In the closing period of the campaign, Howard Goodhew ran harsh attacks on Parent and the city government he had overseen. Internal polling by Parent's campaign late in the race had shown the race between him and Goodhew narrowing, with Goodhew gaining on him. However, in the very last days of the election, Parent's polls again showed him with a more comfortable margin. Some believed that the last-minute attacks on Parent by Goodhew may have backfired on Goodhew.

Parent's campaign had been satisfied that voter turnout improved over the previous election, as they believed that apathy among voters would hurt his chances of reelection.

While Goodhew denied it, there were allegations that a state board that he was chair of was playing politics to aid his campaign when it delayed a bond issue for the city of South Bend.

Parent carried the vote in five of the city's six Common Council (city council) districts The coinciding election for the Common Council (which also had two at-large seats) saw the Democrats retain the 8–1 majority that they had won four years prior.

1983 South Bend mayoral election
Party	Candidate	Votes	%
Democratic	Roger O. Parent (incumbent)	20,734	61.54
Republican	Howard R. Goodhew	11,995	35.70
American	Kathryn Brookins	962	2.86
Turnout		33691	62

== 1987 ==
1987 South Bend mayoral election
- November 3, 1987

Nominee	Joe Kernan	Carl Baxmeyer
Party	Democratic	Republican
Popular vote	17,030	15,104
Percentage	53%	47%
Mayor before election
Roger Parent
Democratic
Elected mayor
Joe Kernan
Democratic

The 1987 South Bend, Indiana mayoral election was held on November 3, 1987. Joe Kernan defeated Republican Carl Baxmeyer. This is the closest that a Republican has come to the mayoralty of South Bend since the last Republican victory in 1967.

=== Background ===
Incumbent Democratic mayor Roger Parent opted not to seek a third term as mayor. Rumors arose that internal polling had shown that, with controversy around the construction of Stanley Coveleski Regional Stadium, Parent would not have been able to win a third term. Several allies of Parent on the Common Council with involvement in the stadium construction would ultimately lose their reelection bids in the May primaries.

=== Primaries ===
Primary elections were held in May.

==== Democratic primary ====
The main two candidates in the Democratic primary were Joe Kernan (the city's former comptroller from 1980 to 1984) and Richard D. Jasinki (an incumbent county commissioner). The primary widely being viewed as a race between the two of them, with their campaigns against each other proving heated and divisive. In addition to Kernan and Jasinki there were several less-prominent candidates running in the primary, including James A. Guy II, R. McAlister Ellis Jr., and Lester Johnson. Kernan prevailed in the primary, receiving 51% of the vote.

While campaigning for the nomination, Kernan distanced himself from incumbent mayor Roger Parent, whom he had served under as comptroller during Parent's first term as mayor. When asked about Parent at a forum, Kernan declared that if elected, "it's going to be Joe Kernan's administration" (as opposed to a continuation of Parent's administration). Kernan also promised that as mayor he would not include Parent in his administration. Additionally, he declared that the controversial baseball stadium project that had been championed by Parent as problematic, but stated that, since it had already been built, the city now needed to make the best use of the stadium rather than, "sulk and pout about it for 20 years." Jasinki promised that if he elected, his mayoral leadership would mark "a complete change" from Parent's administration, and argued that a Kernan mayoralty would contrarily offer, "four more years of the same government." Jasinki staked out a position opposing any further privatization of city services, while Kernan did not take a firm stance on the issue. Jasinki declined to debate Kernan.

Kernan's main campaign message was that the city needed to take action in preparing for its future rather than "sit[ting] back".

Jasinksi (of Polish-American descent) hoped that his campaign could generate broad turnout and a large number of votes in the areas of the city that had been his primary base of support: West Side precincts in neighborhoods with large Polish-American populations. Kernan hoped to counter Jasinksi's ethnic appeal to Polish-American voters by making a public plea the city to unite apart from any ethnic, racial, or religious divisions.

Kernan received the endorsement of former mayor Peter Nemeth, who had left office years earlier as a popular mayor. Nemeth had spent the first several years of his post-mayoralty staying out of city politics, breaking this silence in order to give Kernan what was regarded to be a significant endorsement.

==== Republican primary ====
Carl Baxmeyer, a city planner, won the Republican nomination, defeating opponents Mike Waite and William C.A. Rose Jr. Waite was businessman who had never held public office, and had been original opponent of the stadium. Waite had informally withdrawn from the race after his ex-wife was murdered, but remained on the ballot.

=== General election ===
The 1987 general election was the most recent general election for South Bend mayor to be truly competitive, and was arguably the only truly competitive mayoral general election in the city since 1967 (in which the city's most recent Republican mayor, Lloyd M. Allen, was last elected). Kernan defeated Baxmeyer by a mere 2,000 vote margin. Kernan's narrow margin has been attributed to the Democratic party having been left fractured after a bitter Democratic mayoral primary.

Baxmeyer made a campaign issue out of city attorney Rich Hill, criticizing the city's decision to have hired him, "on a part-time basis at almost twice his former salary". Incumbent mayor Roger Parent disputed Baxmeyer's criticisms, arguing that it made sense to hire Hill due to the fact that he was already caught up on important issues including the city's stadium efforts.

The editorial board of the South Bend Tribune endorsed Kernan, citing his "extensive experience in private business and public service". FOP #36, the city's police union, endorsed Baxmeyer.

=== Results ===
1987 South Bend mayoral election
Party	Candidate	Votes	%
Democratic	Joe Kernan	17,030	53%
Republican	Carl Baxmeyer	15,104	47%
Total votes		32,134	100

== 1991 ==
1991 South Bend mayoral election
- November 5, 1991

Nominee	Joe Kernan	Sylvia Shelton
Party	Democratic	Republican
Popular vote	16,134	4,958
Percentage	76.49%	23.51%
Mayor before election
Joe Kernan
Democratic
Elected mayor
Joe Kernan
Democratic

The 1991 South Bend, Indiana mayoral election was held on November 5, 1991. Incumbent Democratic mayor Joe Kernan was reelected to a second term, defeating Republican challenger Sylvia Shelton.

Shelton would have been the first woman to be elected mayor of South Bend had she won the election. As of 2025, no woman has been elected mayor of South Bend. Turnout in the election was considered to be light, which the South Bend Tribune attributed to cold weather on the day of the election.

1991 South Bend mayoral election results
Party	Candidate	Votes	%
Democratic	Joe Kernan (incumbent)	16,134	76.49
Republican	Sylvia Shelton	4,958	23.51
Total votes		21,092	100

== 1995 ==
1995 South Bend mayoral election
- November 7, 1995

Nominee	Joe Kernan	Mike Waite
Party	Democratic	Republican
Popular vote	14,309	3,106
Percentage	82.17%	17.84%
Mayor before election
Joe Kernan
Democratic
Elected mayor
Joe Kernan
Democratic

The 1995 South Bend, Indiana mayoral election was held on November 7, 1995. Incumbent Democratic mayor Joe Kernan was reelected to a third term, defeating Republican challenger Michael C. "Mike" Waite. Kernan won a record share of the vote for a South Bend mayoral election.

In winning this election, Kernan became the first South Bend mayor since 1905 to win a third term. It also made Kernan poised to break the record, at the time, for longest-serving mayor of South Bend.

=== Primaries ===
==== Democratic primary ====
Joe Kernan won renomination.

==== Republican primary ====
Waite, a businessman who had previously been an unsuccessful candidate in the 1987 South Bend Republican mayoral primary and had never before held public office, won a Republican primary that also featured Larry M. Scott and James W. Philson. Waite was president of High Tech Alarm Corporation Inc. He had also previously been involved in third party politics in 1994.

=== General election ===
Republican Mike Waite encountered several stumbling blocks during his candidacy, including an arrest shortly after the primary election for unpaid bills and a lawsuit for backpay on delinquent child support. Much of the campaign season would center on these controversies. Waite claimed his arrest was politically motivated and orchestrated by Kernan and the St. Joseph County sheriff, with Kernan denying this accusation.

Ultimately, while Waite remained their nominee, the Republican Party withdrew their backing of his candidacy.

Kernan had attracted respect as mayor for his ability to attract economic development to the community.

Kernan campaigned as an opponent of further privatization in the city. While he did not stake out a position opposing all and privatization that had already occurred, he rather positioned himself to be an opponent of what he called the, "wholesale auction of the city's assets". South Bend Republicans had been proponents of further privatization.

Waite criticized Kernan on the issue of crime, accusing him of both ignoring and denying the issue. Kernan argued that he had taken measures to address crime, such as increasing the size of the city's police force by 34 officers since 1991. Kernan also claimed that the rate of violent crime had decreased 19% since the previous year. He conceded, however, that crime was, "the most significant challenge we face in the community". Indicative of the issue of crime, the city had already seen a record murder total in 1995 by the time of the election. Waite's proposals to address crime included spending more funds on the police department, restructuring the police department, and increasing the number of police officers. He argued that this could be accomplished without increasing taxes.

Another issue was a proposed minor league ice hockey arena in South Bend. The city had been approached by an interested minor league ice hockey franchise, and Kernan was open to the idea, and was working to create a committee to weigh the cost and benefits of such a venture. Waite opposed the creation of a South Bend hockey franchise, arguing that stadium financing would take away funding better spent on other needs. Waite also criticized the scheme, arguing that it was problematic that such a new arena would create competition with the region's existing venues such as the Edmund P. Joyce Center. Waite also argued, "If people want to watch hockey they can go see the Notre Dame hockey team."

Another issue debated was the financing for the College Football Hall of Fame, with Waite criticizing the lack of transparency behind its financing and contracts. He characterized it to be a tax burden on the city. At the time, attracting the College Football Hall of Fame to South Bend had been considered one of Kernan's successes as mayor.

Another issue debated was the Blackthorn development, which would see a privately managed golf course surrounded by office developments. Waite opposed this project, while Kernan supported it, arguing that it had added 3,000 jobs and $25 million in investment to the city. Kernan declared, "When Waite says he opposes Blackthorn, he is saying he opposes jobs in the community".

Kernan supported a measure to implement an option tax, arguing that it would provide property tax relief and enable capital improvements. Waite stood in opposition to any new taxes.

Waite criticized Kernan for being allegedly indifferent towards the proposed establishment of an adult bookstore on South Main Street saying, "Mayor Joe Kernan would rather subsidize porno book than school books." He also argued that the city needed more higher paying jobs, and that it was detrimental that city had more service sector employees than manufacturing sector employees. He blamed planning decisions by city government for creating this balance of employment types. Waite also accused Kernan of being guilty of wrongful acts.

A debate was held between Kernan and Waite shortly before of the election.

Speculation had arisen that Kernan would be a prospective nominee for lieutenant governor in the 1996 Indiana gubernatorial election. Kernan denied having any such aspirations at the time, however, he would ultimately be the lieutenant gubernatorial nominee the following year and was elected as such.

==== Result ====
At the time, the voter turnout was considered to be relatively low, with the turnout equating to roughly 20% of the city's overall populace.

Kernan's more than 82% of the vote set a record for South Bend mayoral elections.

Kernan became the first South Bend mayor since 1905 to be elected to a third term.

The election made Kernan poised to become the city's longest-serving mayor at the time, with his mayoral tenure being able to extend than any of his predecessors' mayoralties.

1995 South Bend mayoral election
Party	Candidate	Votes	%
Democratic	Joe Kernan (incumbent)	14,309	82.17
Republican	Mike Waite	3,106	17.84
Total votes		17,415	100

== 1999 ==
1999 South Bend mayoral election
- November 2, 1999
- Turnout: 31%
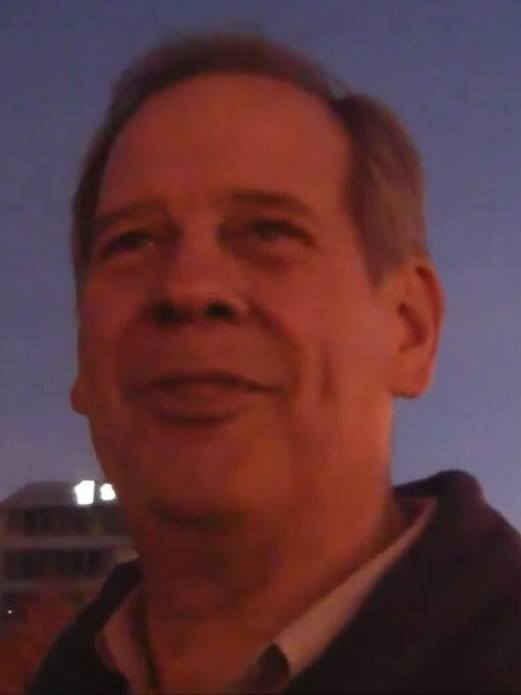

Nominee	Steve Luecke	Steven Bradley
Party	Democratic	Republican
Popular vote	13,678	6,321
Percentage	68.39%	31.61%
Mayor before election
Steve Luecke
Democratic
Elected mayor
Steve Luecke
Democratic

The 1999 South Bend, Indiana mayoral election was held on November 2, 1999. Incumbent Democratic mayor Steve Luecke, who had become mayor after his predecessor Joe Kernan became Lieutenant Governor of Indiana, was reelected to a first full-term (and second overall term).

Luecke faced Republican challenger Steven Bradley.

=== Nominations ===
==== Democratic primary ====
During the Democratic primary election, Luecke was challenged by Portage Township Assessor John Voorde as well as Kevin C. Horton and Zbigniew "Ziggy" Borowski.

Voorde arose as the most significant challenger to Luecke. Voorde was the son of past mayor Edward F. Voorde, who had served from 1956 until his death in office in 1960.

By April, polls reportedly showed Luecke with a double-digit lead over Voorde.

1999 South Bend Democratic mayoral primary
Party	Candidate	Votes	%
Democratic	Stephen J. Luecke (incumbent)	8,265	61.49
Democratic	John Voorde	4,214	31.35
Democratic	Kevin C. Horton	855	6.36
Democratic	Zbigniew "Ziggy" Borowski	108	0.80
Total votes		13,442	100

==== Republican primary ====
Steve Bradley defeated Melvin Townsend in the Republican primary.

1999 South Bend Republican mayoral primary
Party	Candidate	Votes	%
Republican	Steven Clark Bradley	1,195	81.18
Republican	Marvin Townsend	277	18.82
Total votes		1,472	100

=== General election ===
During the election campaign, Bradley criticized Luecke's record on public safety. Bradley used FBI statistics to claim that New York City was safer than South Bend in regards to violent crime. However, Luecke accused Bradley of distorting statistics, accusing Bradley of being "incorrigible" and using a Richard Nixon-style campaign tactic of distributing falsehoods.

Bradley criticized Luecke for taking what he argued was too long to appoint a new police chief after South Bend's previous police chief resigned after being charged with a DUI, stating, It's time for the mayor to act like a mayor and show some leadership," and declaring that the South Bend Police Department had been left "rudderless".

Bradley proposed a business incentive development plan.

Bradley placed emphasis on the city's loss of 1,000 jobs at AMGeneral and South Bend Stamping.

Bradley attacked Luecke for having been a conscientious objector during the Vietnam War.

Bradley ran a billboard which read "My girlfriend said it's either her or south bend. My girlfriend is gone. For me it's South Bend". This billboard was speculated to be one of the reasons Bradley would be shown to poll poorly among women voters.

Ahead of the election, polls showed Luecke to be in the lead. A poll conducted October 13–15 by Howey Political Report found Luecke leading 51 to 32 (with 17% of respondents being "undecided") with a +/-5.2 margin. A similarly timed South Bend Tribune poll found Luecke to have a 14-point lead. Additionally, South Bend was considered to be a strongly Democratic city. A Republican had not been elected mayor of the city since Loyd Allen his second term in 1967.

Turnout in the election was 31%.

1999 South Bend mayoral election
Party	Candidate	Votes	%
Democratic	Stephen J. Luecke (incumbent)	13,678	68.39
Republican	Steven Bradley	6,321	31.61
Total votes		19,999	100

== 2003 ==
2003 South Bend mayoral election
- November 4, 2003
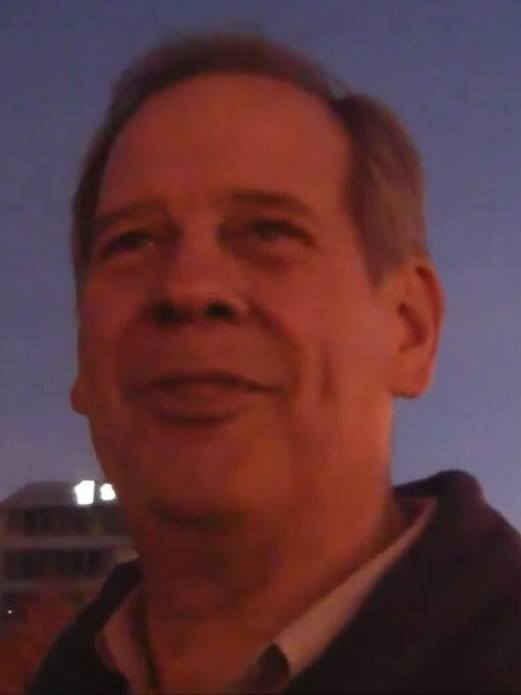

Nominee	Steve Luecke	Thomas R. Schmidt
Party	Democratic	Republican
Popular vote	10,598	4,188
Percentage	71.68%	28.32%
Mayor before election
Steve Luecke
Democratic
Elected mayor
Steve Luecke
Democratic

The 2003 South Bend, Indiana mayoral election was held on November 4, 2003. Incumbent Democratic mayor Steve Luecke was reelected to a second full-term (and third overall term).

=== Nominations ===
==== Democratic primary ====
Incumbent mayor Steve Luecke was unchallenged in the Democratic Party's primary election. Originally attempting to challenge Leucke for the nomination was 1995 Republican mayoral nominee (and failed 1987 South Bend Republican mayoral primary candidate) Michael C. "Mike" Waite.

2003 South Bend mayoral Democratic primary
Party	Candidate	Votes	%
Democratic	Stephen J. Luecke (incumbent)	7,480	100
Total votes		7,480	100

==== Republican primary ====
After a long search to try and find a candidate, hours before the deadline for a candidate to register, St. Joseph County Republican chairman Matt Lentsch announced Thomas Schmidt as a candidate/presumptive nominee. Thomas R. Schmidt was unchallenged in the Republican primary.

2003 South Bend Republican Democratic primary
Party	Candidate	Votes	%
Republican	Thomas R. Schmidt	1,497	100
Total votes		1,497	100

=== General election ===
Luecke was heavily favored to win the election.

2003 wound up being a good year for Democrats in Indiana's mayoral elections, with the party winning control of the mayoralties of all of the state's top seven most populous cities for the first time since 1959. The Democratic Party also won control of the mayoralties in twenty of the state's thirty cities with populations above 25,000. Additionally, in 2003, Democrats won more than 56% of partisan mayoral races in Indiana.

During the general election, St. Joseph County, where South Bend is located, saw voter turnout of 15% in its various elections.

2003 South Bend mayoral election
Party	Candidate	Votes	%
Democratic	Stephen J. Luecke (incumbent)	10,598	71.68
Republican	Thomas R. Schmidt	4,188	28.32
Total votes		14,786	100

== 2007 ==
2007 South Bend mayoral election
- November 6, 2007
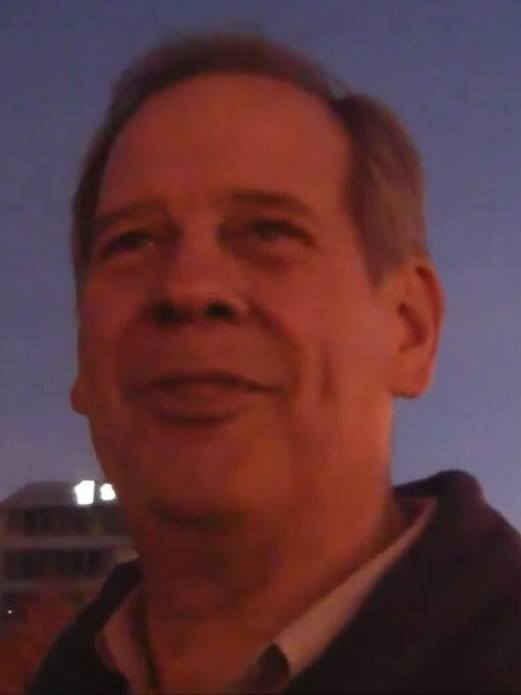

Nominee	Steve Luecke	Juan A. Manigault
Party	Democratic	Republican
Popular vote	12,355	7,471
Percentage	62.14%	37.57%
Mayor before election
Steve Luecke
Democratic
Elected mayor
Steve Luecke
Democratic

The 2007 South Bend, Indiana mayoral election was held on November 6, 2007. Incumbent Democratic mayor Steve Luecke was reelected to a third full-term (and fourth overall term).

=== Nominations ===
During the primary elections, St. Joseph County, where South Bend is located, saw voter turnout of 10% in its various primary elections.

==== Democratic primary ====
Incumbent mayor Steve Luecke defeated challenger William F. "Bill" Davis in the Democratic primary. Davis was widely-unknown. Davis' primary past political endeavor was an unsuccessful 1994 campaign for a seat on the South Bend School Board. Davis stated that his primary concerns were the corrosion of the city's neighborhoods and the decline of its tax base.

2007 South Bend Democratic mayoral primary
Party	Candidate	Votes	%
Democratic	Stephen J. Luecke (incumbent)	4,781	79.12
Democratic	William F. Davis	1,262	20.88
Total votes		6,043	100

==== Republican primary ====
For the first time since 1999, the Republican primary for mayor was a contested one.

The primary was won by Juan A. Manigualt, the president and CEO of Workforce Development. He defeated Terry S. Miller, who was a business owner that had served on the South Bend Common Council from 1972 until 1979. Miller had also been a member of the Century Center Board of Managers, serving as its president from 1981 until 1982. Miller had more recently served as a lobbyist and public policy director for the St. Joseph County Chamber of Commerce.

In his primary race Manigault raised $30,000 in funds.

Manigualt was endorsed in the primary by Fraternal Order of Police Post 36.

The primary race was projected as a "tossup".

2007 South Bend Republican mayoral primary
Party	Candidate	Votes	%
Republican	Juan A. Manigault	1,690	66.77
Republican	Terry S. Miller	841	33.23
Total votes		2,531	100

=== General election ===
South Bend was a heavily Democratic city. No Republican had been elected mayor of South Bend since Lloyd Allen was reelected in 1967.

The South Bend Tribune endorsed incumbent mayor Luecke. Manigault boasted several endorsements, among them was the endorsement of Fraternal Order of Police Post 36, American Family Association Indiana, Indiana Family Action, and Citizens for Community Values Indiana.

Manigault resigned from his position as head of Workforce Development to focus on his candidacy.

There was some hope among Republicans that Manigault, a Hispanic man, may be able to attract Hispanic voters to his candidacy. Being Hispanic, if Manigault was elected mayor, he would have been the first ethnic minority to be elected to a full-time executive office in St. Joseph County. No ethnic minority would be elected to a full-time executive office in St. Joseph County until the 2015 South Bend City Clerk election was won by Kareemah Fowler.

Manigault made the issue of economic development central to his candidacy. In his vision for development in South Bend, Manigault stated that he wanted to see, "strong emphasis on private investment." Manigault took issue with Luecke's interim economic development director Jeff Ginbey, arguing that his continuing role as president of the South Bend Heritage Foundation presented conflict of interest. Mangault also criticized the size of the city's economic planning and development department, proclaiming it to be much larger than the comparably sized city of Fort Wayne, yet arguably not significantly more successful than Fort Wayne's department.

Luecke criticized Manigault for record keeping issues from his tenure as the head of Workforce Development. The state had previously audited the firm and found missing funds.

Luecke claimed that crime had decreased 24 percent during his tenure as mayor. Manigualt criticized Luecke on the issue of crime, arguing that it was unacceptable that the city remained above the national average for crime.

Manigault argued that South Bend had lost jobs and companies to nearby Mishawaka, citing WSBT-TV, Schurz Communications (the parent company of the South Bend Tribune), St. Joseph Regional Medical Center, and Northwest Mutual Life as examples. Luecke countered this, saying, "South Bend and Mishawaka are all part of a regional economy. Yeah, a couple of companies have moved out, but many more have moved in." Luecke cited the recent relocation of Odyssean Technology from Mishawaka to South Bend as an example of companies moving to the city.

Luecke cited $1.3 billion in investments made in the city during his tenure. He also argued that downtown South Bend was experiencing growth.

Luecke had over the years envisioned South Bend as a regional center for arts and culture, taking actions which had generated a growth in the offerings of entertainment and dining in the city's downtown. Two studies that were recent at the time of the election had demonstrated that these efforts by Luecke were allowing the city to enjoy millions in economic spending. For instance, a study by Saint Mary's College showed that the city-owned Morris Performing Arts Center would generate a $5.9 annual indirect economic impact, excluding its own ticket sales.

Luecke envisioned a need for South Bend to capitalize on what he argued were its greatest strengths, its location and its proximity to Chicago. He argued at future in "advanced logistics" declaring that, "We're in a great location for warehousing and distribution."

A debate was held at Indiana University South Bend.

A late-September poll by Research 2000 showed Luecke polling at 42% favorable and 35% unfavorable among residents, with 23% undecided in their opinions on him. For Manigault these numbers were 36% favorable, 21% unfavorable, and 43% undecided.

In October, a Republican mailer generated controversy during the election. The mailer featured a card with an image tombstone surrounded by a desolate landscape, with an epitaph reading, "RIP. Here lies South Bend, a once vibrant city now abandoned by business, overrun by violent crime and driving people from their family homes because of high property taxes." On the reverse, the card accused Luecke of having "neglected our city and allowed it to die". Luecke stated that he had heard from many residents upset with these mailers. Manigault, while claiming he had nothing to do with sending these mailers, defended them, declaring that they were not demonstrative of 'negative campaigning' because, "This is the truth. This is where the city is headed. This is what the city has become."

By October 12 Luecke had raised $253,939 and Manigault had raised $152,913 in funds.

Manigault's campaign had presented enough of a challenge to Luecke that the state Democratic party allotted additional funds to Luecke's campaign in the autumn.

Luecke was initially seen as having very strong odds of reelection. However, by August, some experts considered the race as a potential "tossup". Ultimately, however, the race was seen as being in Luecke's favor.

==== Polls ====
Poll source	Date(s) administered	Sample size	Margin of error	Steve Luecke	Juan Manigault	Other	Undecided
Research 2000	September 26–28	400	± 5%	44%	32%	1%	23%
Research 2000	October 25–26	400	± 5%	48%	38%	2%	12%

==== Results ====
Luecke won far broader margin-of-victory than many had anticipated he would.

In fifteen other Indiana cities, incumbent mayors had not been so lucky and had lost their general elections, including the upset loss of Indianapolis mayor Bart Peterson to Republican challenger Greg Ballard as well as the incumbents of Terre Haute, Anderson, La Porte, Delphi, West Lafayette, Tell City, Franklin, Madison, Charlestown, Plymouth, Vincennes, Washington, Huntingburg, and Frankfort.

After his predecessor Joe E. Kernan, this election made Luecke only the second South Bend mayor in the previous hundred years to have been elected to a third full term.

During the general election, St. Joseph County, where South Bend is located, saw voter turnout of 15% in its various elections.

2007 South Bend mayoral election
Party	Candidate	Votes	%
Democratic	Stephen J. Luecke (incumbent)	12,355	62.14
Republican	Juan A. Manigault	7,471	37.57
Green	Thomas Eugene Brown (write-in)	58	0.29
Total votes		19,884	100

== 2011 ==
2011 South Bend mayoral election
- November 8, 2011
- Turnout: 20.29%
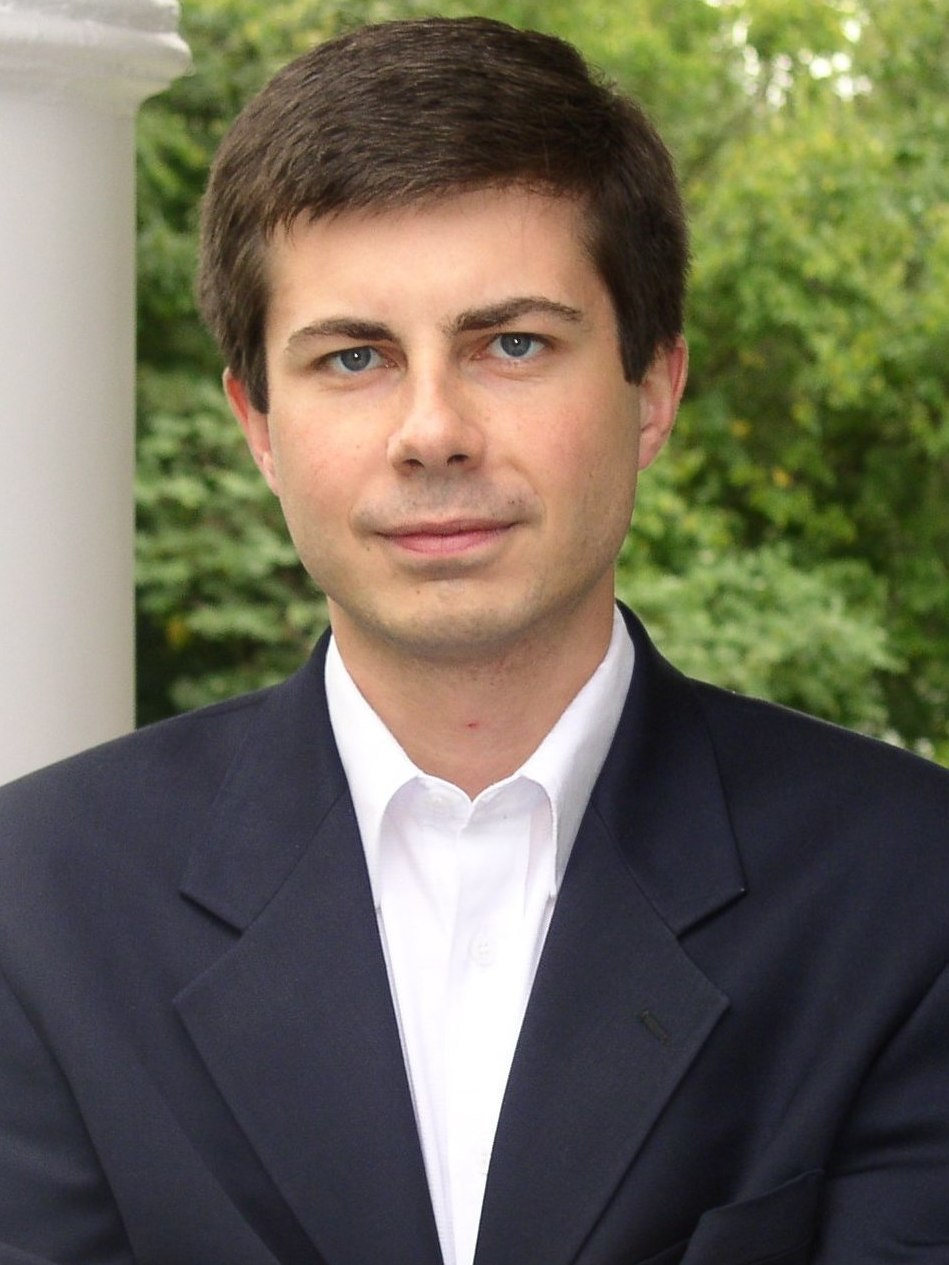

Nominee	Pete Buttigieg	Norris W. Curry Jr	Patrick M. Farrell
Party	Democratic	Republican	Libertarian
Popular vote	10,991	2,884	1,008
Percentage	73.85%	19.38%	6.77%
Mayor before election
Steve Luecke
Democratic
Elected mayor
Pete Buttigieg
Democratic

The 2011 South Bend, Indiana mayoral election was held on November 8, 2011.

After serving for fourteen years, incumbent Democratic mayor Steve Luecke made the surprise announcement that he would not seek reelection. Luecke's decision not to run for reelection made the 2011 election the first open election for mayor of South Bend in 24 years.

The election was won by Democratic nominee Pete Buttigieg, who, at 29 years of age, became the youngest mayor, at the time, of a United States city with a population greater than 100,000.

=== Democratic primary ===
Democratic primary election candidates included failed 2010 Indiana State treasurer candidate Pete Buttigieg, state representative Ryan Dvorak, high school teacher and St. Joseph Councilman Michael Hamann, reverend and former Clinton administration staffer Barrett Berry, and attorney Felipe Merino.

2011 South Bend Democratic mayoral primary
Party	Candidate	Votes	%
Democratic	Pete Buttigieg	7,663	54.90
Democratic	Michael J. Hamann	2,798	20.05
Democratic	Ryan Dvorak	2,041	14.62
Democratic	Barrett Berry	1,424	10.20
Democratic	Felipe N. Merino	32	0.23
Total votes		13,958	100

==== Republican primary ====
By April, Norris W. Curry, also known as Wayne Curry, had already established himself as the broad frontrunner in the Republican primary. Curry, a carpenter and construction contractor, had won the support of the local Republican establishment ahead of the primary. Curry also was considered the best-known individual among those contending for the Republican nomination, and was also the most visible campaigner. Curry had previously run unsuccessfully for an at-large city council seat in 2007, as well as a county council seat in 2008. Curry had some experience in government and community projects, including having served as chairman for the Economic Development Panel of South Bend's City Plan process from 2003 through 2006. He had also served as treasurer for both the Community Oriented Policing Leadership Council and the North East Neighborhood Council.

Also running in the Republican primary was William F. "Bill" Davis, a self-proclaimed "independent" who had challenged mayor Luecke for the Democratic nomination in the previous election. He had also run for other offices in the past, with his most recent campaign having been a 2008 St. Joseph County Commissioner's election in which he had received 40% of the vote. Davis was described by local reporter Ralph Heibutzki as the "least conventional" candidate in either party's primary. He received media attention for his troublesome history, which included periods in which he had stayed in prisons and in mental hospitals. Davis argued that his history was less relevant than the platform on which he was running.

Additionally running was Wilson R. Taylor II, also known as Will Taylor. Taylor's career was as a real estate investor who flipped properties.

2011 South Bend Republican mayoral primary
Party	Candidate	Votes	%
Republican	Norris W. Curry Jr.	655	65.83
Republican	William F. Davis	248	24.93
Republican	Wilson R. Taylor II	92	9.25
Total votes		995	100

==== Libertarian nomination ====
The Libertarian Party nominated Patrick M. Farrell.

=== General election ===
2011 South Bend mayoral election
Party	Candidate	Votes	%
Democratic	Pete Buttigieg	10,991	73.85
Republican	Norris W. Curry Jr.	2,884	19.38
Libertarian	Patrick M. Farrell	1,008	6.77
Total votes		14,883	100

== 2015 ==
2015 South Bend mayoral election
- November 3, 2015
- Turnout: 14.1%
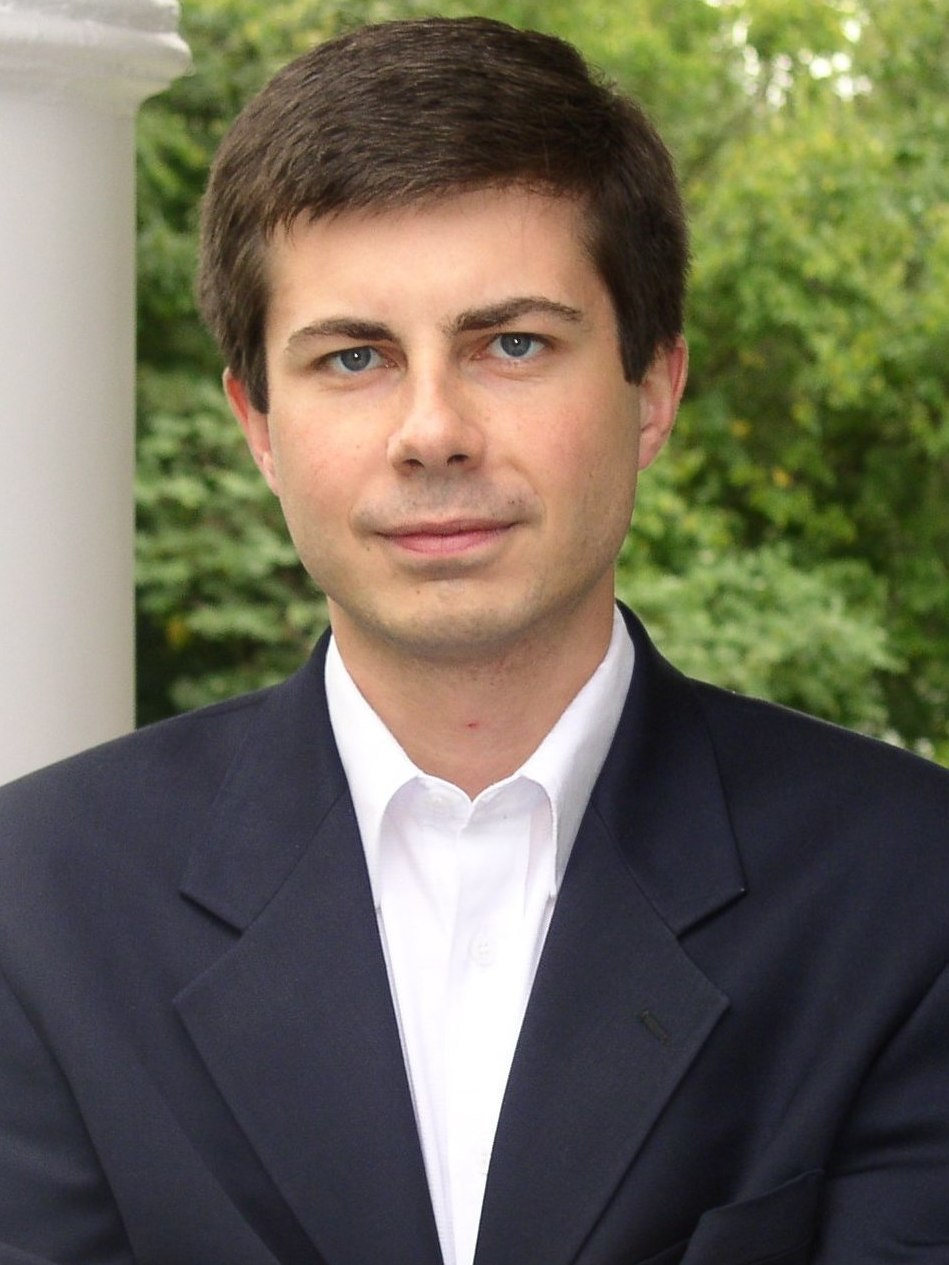

Nominee	Pete Buttigieg	Kelly Jones
Party	Democratic	Republican
Popular vote	8,515	2,074
Percentage	80.41%	19.59%
- Results by city district
Mayor before election
Pete Buttigieg
Democratic
Elected mayor
Pete Buttigieg
Democratic

The 2015 South Bend, Indiana mayoral election was held on November 3, 2015. The election was won by incumbent Democrat Pete Buttigieg, who was reelected with more than 80 percent of the votes, defeating Republican Kelly Jones.

=== Primaries ===
==== Democratic primary ====
Incumbent mayor Pete Buttigieg was challenged by outgoing 2nd district South Bend Common Council member Henry Davis.

2015 South Bend Democratic mayoral primary
Party	Candidate	Votes	%
Democratic	Pete Buttigieg (incumbent)	8,369	77.68
Democratic	Henry L. Davis Jr.	2,405	22.32
Total votes		10,774	100

==== Republican primary ====
Kelly Jones was unopposed in the Republican primary.

Jones was a jewelry maker who had previously run unsuccessfully for a school board seat. She had first considered running for mayor as a Democrat before running as a Republican. Jones was politically little-known when she launched her candidacy, and would subsequently fail to gain much notability during her candidacy.

Republicans had unsuccessfully sought to recruit a more serious challenger to Buttigieg.

2015 South Bend Republican mayoral primary
Party	Candidate	Votes	%
Republican	Kelly S. Jones	650	100
Total votes		650	100

=== General election ===
2015 South Bend mayoral election
Party	Candidate	Votes	%
Democratic	Pete Buttigieg (incumbent)	8,515	80.41
Republican	Kelly S. Jones	2,074	19.59
Total votes		10,589	100

== 2019 ==
2019 South Bend mayoral election
- November 5, 2019
- Turnout: 15%
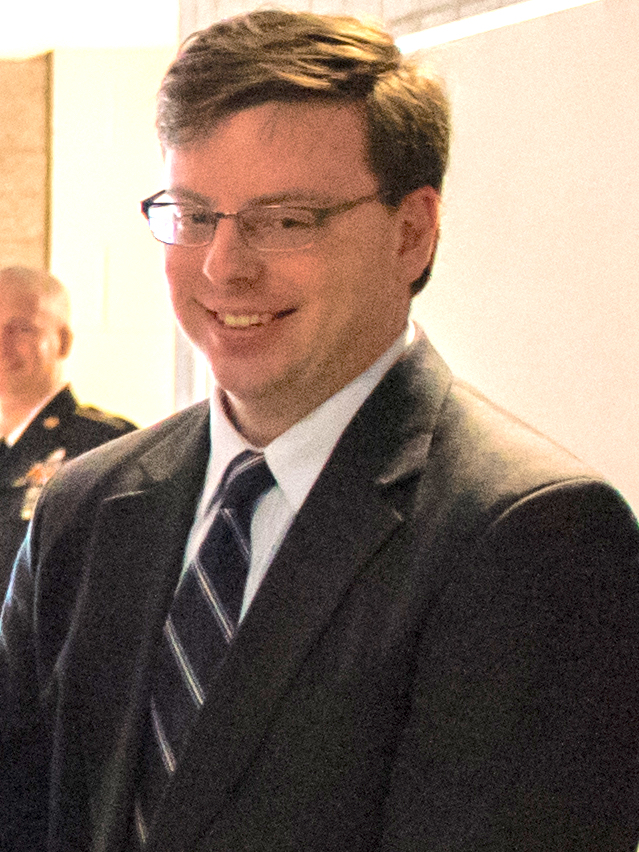

Nominee	James Mueller	Sean M. Haas
Party	Democratic	Republican
Popular vote	9,437	5,445
Percentage	63.41%	36.58%
- Results by city district
Mayor before election
Pete Buttigieg
Democratic
Elected mayor
James Mueller
Democratic

The 2019 South Bend, Indiana mayoral election was held on November 5, 2019.

On December 17, 2018, incumbent two-term Democratic mayor Pete Buttigieg announced that he would not seek reelection to a third term. Speculation arose that Buttigieg was considering a run for President of the United States, and Buttigieg would later announce his 2020 presidential campaign. The general election race to succeed Buttigieg as mayor was between Democratic nominee James Mueller and Republican nominee Sean M. Haas. Mueller won the election by nearly 4,000 votes.

=== Primaries ===
The primary elections were held May 7.

==== Democratic primary ====
In February, Buttigieg endorsed candidate James Mueller as his preferred successor. Mueller largely ran a campaign promising to continue the progress made under Buttigieg's mayoralty. Buttigieg appeared in campaign ads for Mueller and even donated to Mueller's campaign. Mueller, a first-time candidate for public office, ultimately won a solid victory in a crowded primary field. Prior to launching his campaign Mueller lacked name recognition. The Democratic primary was competitive.

===== Candidates =====
- Lynn Coleman, current community liaison at Memorial Hospital, former South Bend police officer, former special assistant to mayor Steve Luecke, and Democratic nominee for Indiana's 2nd congressional district in 2016
- Jason Critchlow, senior project manager for a clinical research company and the former chairman of the St. Joseph County Democratic Party
- Oliver Davis, 6th district South Bend City Councilor and vice-president of Common Council, former president of the Common Council
- James Mueller, former chief of staff to mayor Pete Buttigieg and former executive director of community investment for South Bend
- Will Smith, entrepreneur
- Regina Williams-Preston, 2nd District City Councilor and teacher
- Richard O. Wright, Downtown South Bend Ambassador

Withdrawn

- Shane Inez, teenage entrepreneur
- Salvador G. Rodriguez

Declined to run

- Pete Buttigieg, incumbent Mayor of South Bend, Democratic candidate for President of the United States
- Ryan Dvorak, state representative and 2011 mayoral candidate
- Michael Hamann, St. Joseph County Auditor, former St. Joseph County Council member, and 2011 mayoral candidate
- David L. Niezgodski, state senator and former state representative
- Aaron Perri, South Bend Director of Venues, Parks and Arts and former executive director of Downtown South Bend
- Tim Scott, 1st District South Bend City Councilor and Common Council President

===== Results =====
Results by district Mueller Coleman

2019 South Bend mayoral primary
Party	Candidate	Votes	%
Democratic	James Mueller	4,447	37.37
Democratic	Jason Critchlow	3,081	25.89
Democratic	Lynn Coleman	2,701	22.70
Democratic	Regina Williams-Preston	876	7.36
Democratic	Oliver Davis	723	6.08
Democratic	Salvador Rodriguez	23	0.19
Democratic	Will Smith	18	0.15
Democratic	Shane Inez	16	0.13
Democratic	Richard Wright	15	0.13
Total votes		11,900	100

==== Republican primary ====
Sean M. Haas ran unopposed for the Republican nomination.

2019 South Bend Republican mayoral primary
Party	Candidate	Votes	%
Republican	Sean M. Haas	908	100
Total votes		908	100

=== General election ===
2019 South Bend mayoral election results
Party	Candidate	Votes	%
Democratic	James Mueller	9,437	63.41
Republican	Sean M. Haas	5,445	36.58
Total votes		14,882	100

== 2023 ==
2023 South Bend mayoral election
- November 7, 2023
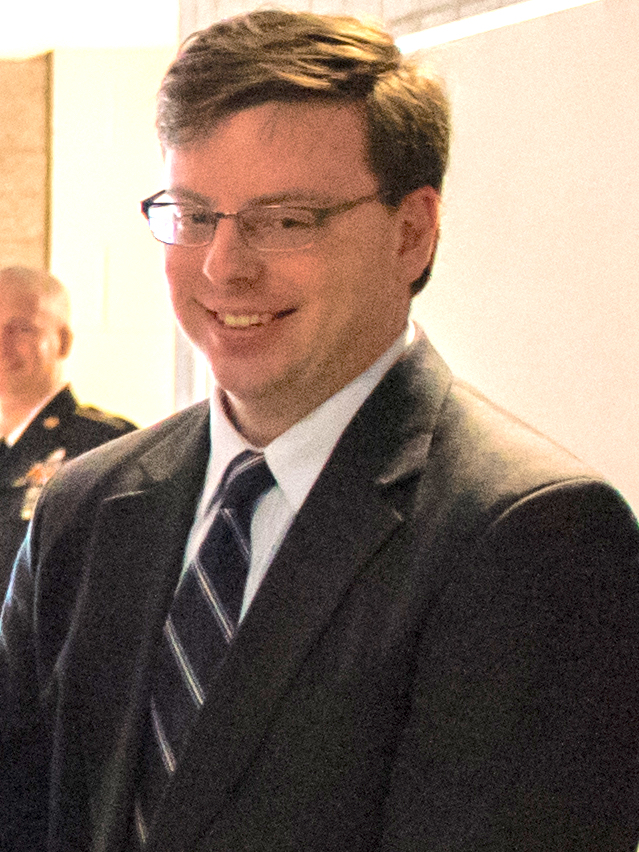

Nominee	James Mueller	Desmont Upchurch
Party	Democratic	Republican
Popular vote	7,877	2,938
Percentage	72.83%	27.17%
- Results by city district
Mayor before election
James Mueller
Democratic
Elected mayor
James Mueller
Democratic

The 2023 South Bend, Indiana mayoral election was held on November 7, 2023. It saw the reelection of Democrat James Mueller.

Primary elections were held on May 2, 2023.

On November 7, 2023, Muller was reelected mayor with over 70 percent of the vote.

=== Democratic primary ===
Declared candidates

- Henry Davis Jr., South Bend City Councilor (2007–2015; 2019–present), candidate for mayor in 2015
- James Mueller, incumbent mayor since 2019

2023 Democratic primary results
Party	Candidate	Votes	%
Democratic	James Mueller (incumbent)	4,880	67.50
Democratic	Henry Davis Jr.	2,350	32.50
Total votes		7,230	100

=== Republican primary ===
Declared candidates

- Desmont Upchurch

2023 Republican primary results
Party	Candidate	Votes	%
Republican	Desmont Upchurch	789	100
Total votes		789	100

=== General election ===
2023 South Bend mayoral election results
Party	Candidate	Votes	%
Democratic	James Mueller (incumbent)	7,877	72.83
Republican	Desmont Upchurch	2,938	27.17
Total votes		10,815	100
