= South Bend Museum of Art =

Art museum in Indiana, United States

- Established: 1947
- Location: 120 S. Joseph Street; South Bend, Indiana
- Coordinates: 41.676156°N 86.248288°W
- Type: Art
- Website: www.southbendart.org

The South Bend Museum of Art is located in South Bend, Indiana. Founded in 1947, the museum features historical and contemporary art in five galleries, and offers instruction in its studios. Since 1987, the museum has been accredited by the American Alliance of Museums, the highest level of professional standards. Located inside Century Center in downtown South Bend, the museum occupies three levels in the northern wing of the building, designed by Philip Johnson and John Burgee.

The museum's permanent collection is exhibited in the Carmichael Gallery and includes a mix of styles and imagery by American artists from the 19th Century to present day: historical paintings by the Hoosier Group of Impressionists as well as works by living Midwestern artists.

The museum galleries are infused with new work regularly. National traveling shows and thematic exhibitions fill the Warner Gallery; the Art League Gallery displays solo and group exhibitions by professional artists living and working in the Midwest; the Jerome J. Crowley Community Gallery exhibits local artist groups or student and faculty work.
