= Steve Luecke =

American politician

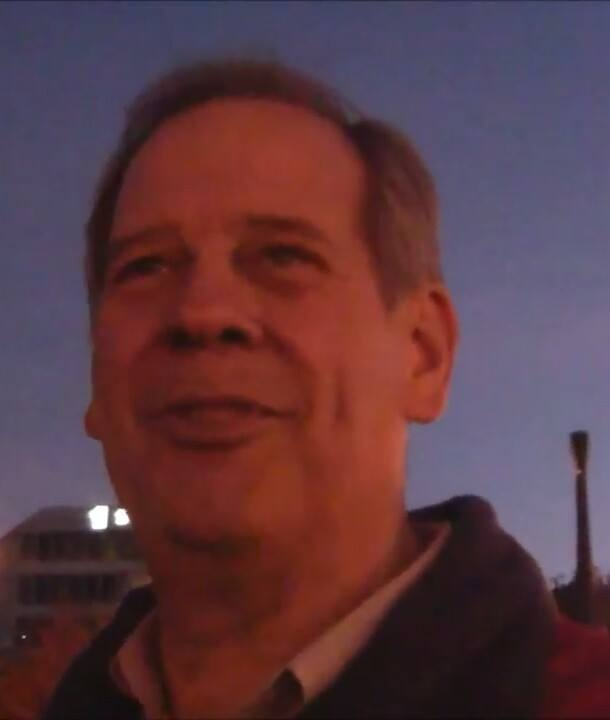
- Luecke in 2011

31st Mayor of South Bend
- In office January 3, 1997 – January 1, 2012
- Preceded by: Joe Kernan
- Succeeded by: Pete Buttigieg

Member of the South Bend Common Council from the 1st District
- In office January 3, 1988 – January 3, 1997

Personal details
- Born: Freeport, Illinois, U.S.
- Party: Democratic
- Spouse: Peg
- Education: Fordham University

Stephen J. Luecke (born 1950) is an American politician who served as the 31st mayor of South Bend, Indiana, United States from 1997 to 2012. A member of the Democratic Party, he was the longest-serving mayor in the city's history.

== Early life and education ==
Luecke grew up in of Freeport, Illinois.

Luecke attended the University of Notre Dame and graduated from Fordham University.

During the Vietnam War, Luecke had been a conscientious objector.

== Early career ==
Before entering politics, Luecke worked first as a carpenter apprentice for four years. After this he worked as a partner in the Old Building Recycling Co., which restored holder homes. After this he worked at the South Bend Heritage Foundation, a foundation focusing on affordable housing and other local issues.

Elected in 1987, Luecke served as a member of the South Bend Common Council for nine years, serving as the councilman for the 1st District in the city's northwest.

== Mayoralty ==
In January 1997, Luecke became mayor of South Bend, filling the vacancy created by the departure of Mayor Joe E. Kernan, who had become lieutenant governor. He was endorsed by Kernan to be his successor, and was thereafter appointed unanimously by the Common Council to fill the vacancy. Luecke remained mayor until 2011. A Democrat, he was the city's longest-serving mayor. Luecke was first reelected in 1999, being reelected in 2003 and 2007.

Highlights of Luecke's tenure as mayor included a reduction in crime in the city, urban redevelopment efforts, and the renovation of the Morris Performing Arts Center.

During Luecke's tenure South Bend received a number of positive accolades, such as being named an All-America City by the National Civic League in 2011 and receiving the National League of Cities Gold Award for Municipal Excellence in both 2002 and 2010. However, it also received some negative accolades, being listed by Newsweek in a January 2011 article as one of "America's Dying Cities".

Luecke opted against running for what would have been a fourth full (and fifth overall) term as mayor, making the 2011 South Bend mayoral election an open race to succeed him, and the first open mayoral election in South Bend in 24 years. Luecke abstained from endorsing any candidate ahead of the Democratic primary. The race to succeed Luecke was ultimately won by Pete Buttigieg.

=== Arts and culture ===
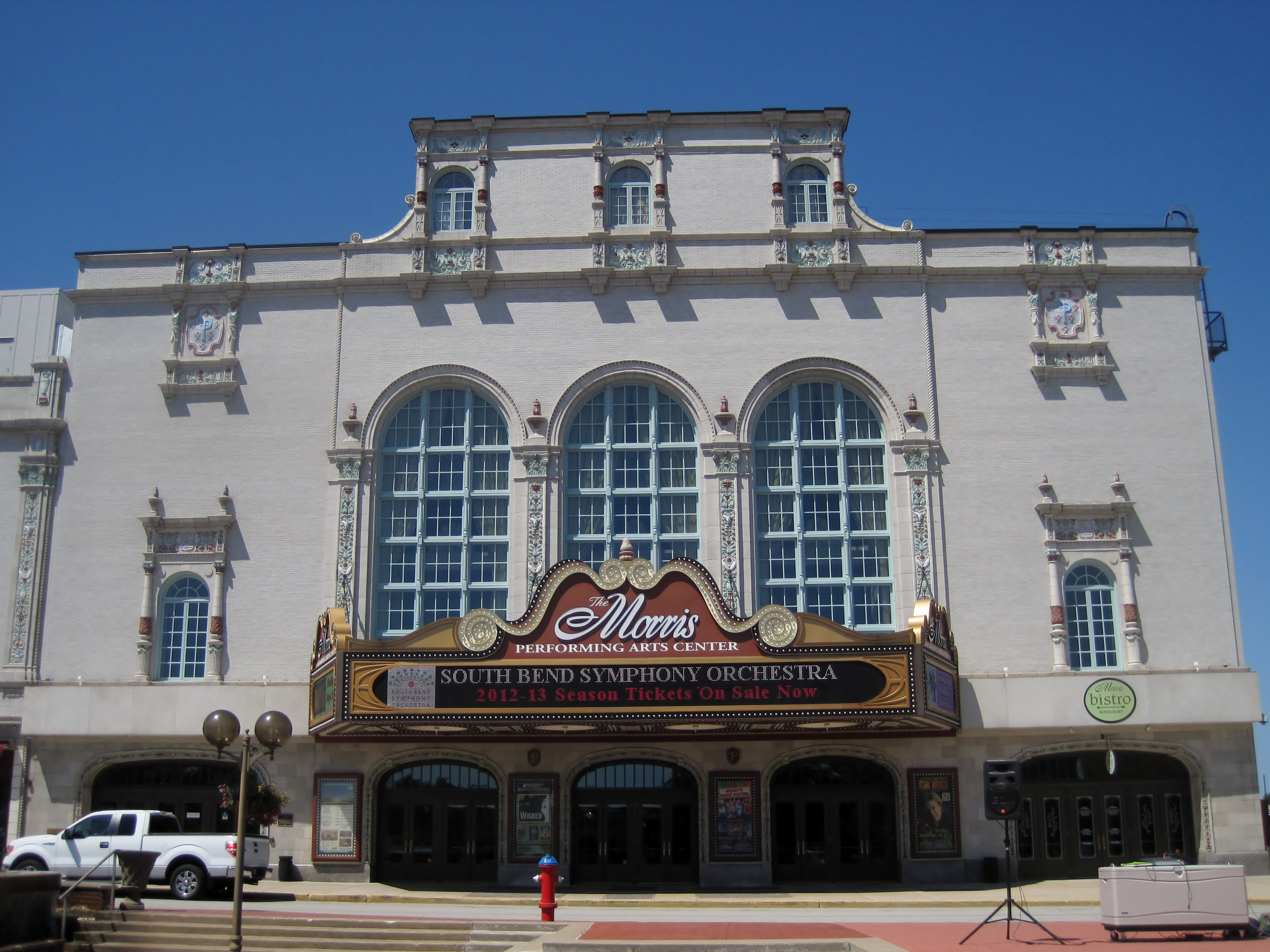
Morris Performing Arts Center

As mayor, Luecke envisioned South Bend as a regional center for arts and culture. He took actions which had generated a growth in the offerings of entertainment and dining in the city's downtown.

The Morris Performing Arts Center was renovated in 2000 under his mayoralty. Two studies conducted around 2007 had demonstrated that these efforts by Luecke were allowing the city to enjoy millions in economic spending. One of these, a study by Saint Mary's College, showed that the city-owned Morris Performing Arts Center would generate a $5.9 annual indirect economic impact, excluding its own ticket sales.

=== Development and private investment ===
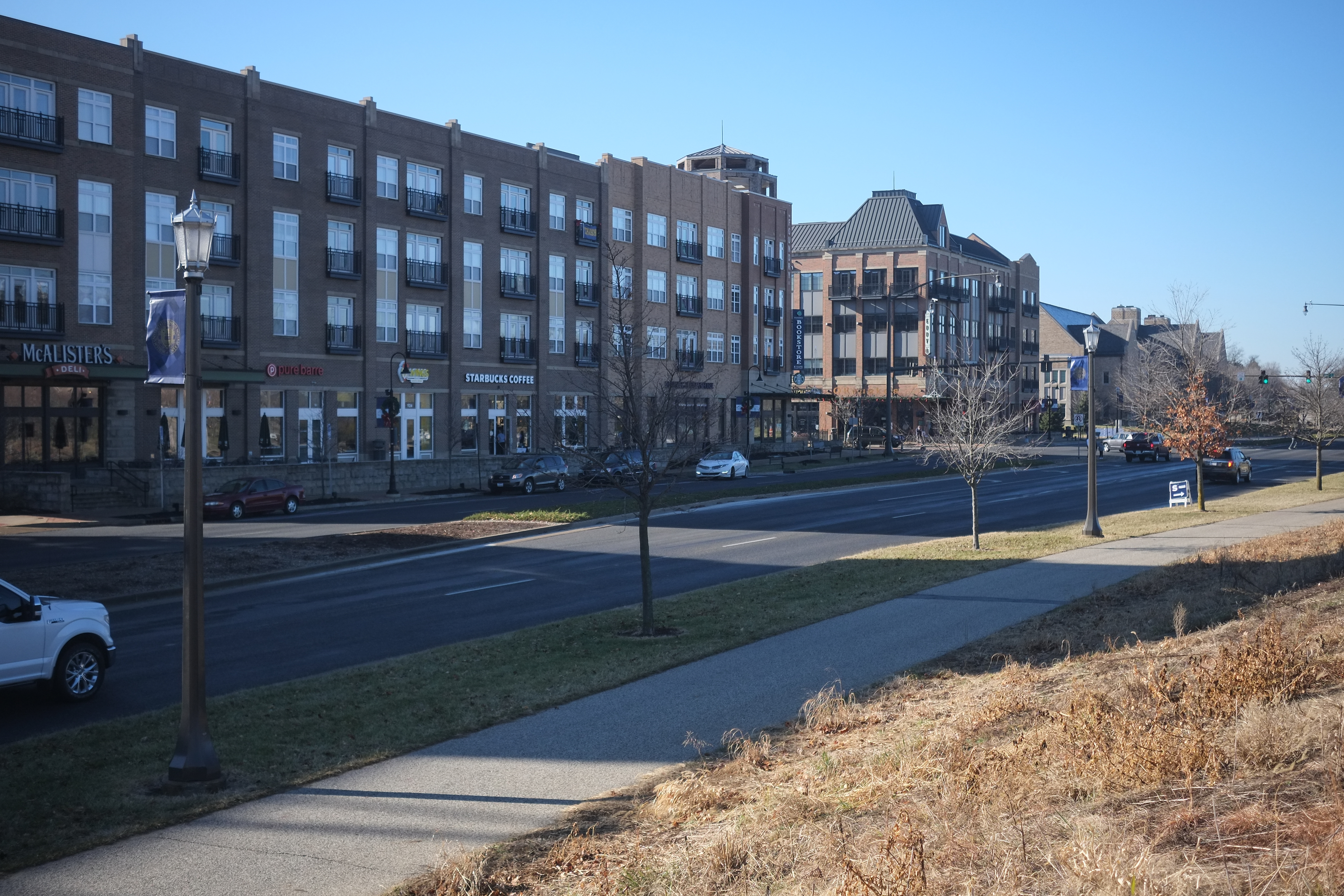
Eddy Street Commons

A major new development that the city saw during Luecke's tenure was the beginning of the first phase of Eddy Street Commons. Leucke had supported Eddy Street Commons in the approval stage. Other projects included redevelopment along West Washington Street.

The city saw the construction of a The Salvation Army Ray & Joan Kroc Corps Community Center during Luecke's mayoralty.

Luecke is credited for having strengthened the relationship between the City of South Bend and the nearby University of Notre Dame.

Under Luecke, the city made the decision that the former Studebaker plant buildings would be demolished for new use. The city put together TIF funds and federal funding to clear the site, which later became the site of the Innovation Park and Ignition Park tech parks. Innovation Park broke ground in September 2008.

By 2007, Luecke was proclaiming that the city had seen $1.3 billion in investments during his tenure.

=== Environment ===
Luecke took some actions regarding the reducing city's harm to the environment.

In 2008, Luecke signed the U.S. Mayors Climate Protection Agreement.

In April 2009, Luecke launched the Green Ribbon Commission to issue recommendations regarding the city's environmental impact. In 2010, he established the Municipal Energy Office, which prioritizes environmental concerns such as energy efficiency, renewable energy, transportation efficiency and innovation, municipal regulation, and recycling and waste management.

Among the infrastructure efforts undertaken during his tenure was a "smart sewer" program. On his last day in office, Leucke's administration, on behalf of the city, signed a consent decree with the Environmental Protection Agency that the City of South Bend would make sewer improvements by 2031 that were projected to cost, altogether, $713 million. The "smart sewer" program was subsequently built upon substantially by his successor Buttigieg.

=== Parks and recreation ===
Under Luecke, the city made a number of improvements to its parks and established new bike and pedestrian paths.

=== Transportation ===
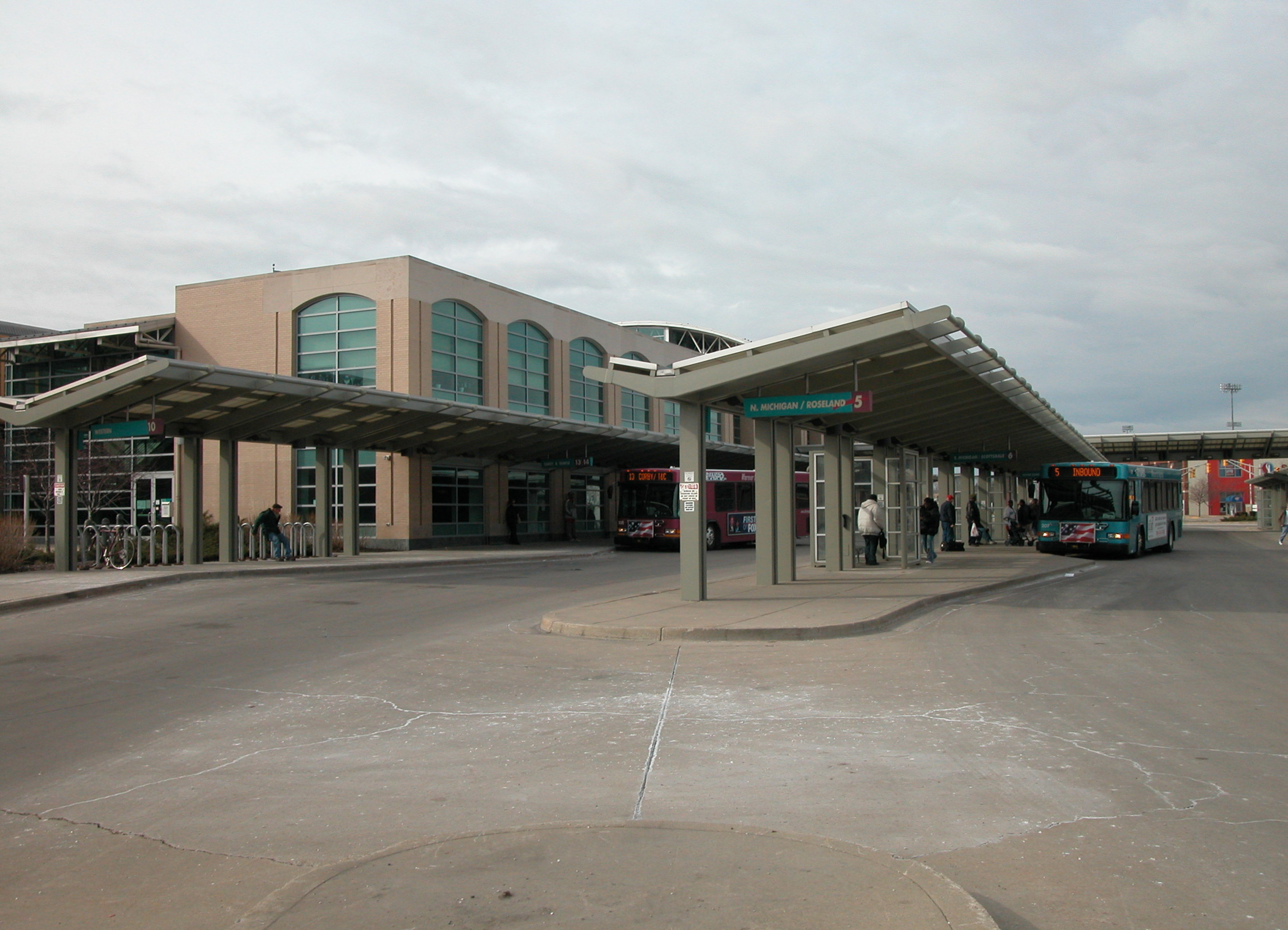
South Street Station, opened in 1998

In 1998, the South Street Station, a bus center, opened in downtown South Bend. The effort to build the station had begun planning in the mayoralty of Luecke's predecessor Joe Kernan. It opened without an originally-planned Amtrak station component. Luecke sought to have the Amtrak component constructed, but was unsuccessful.

In 2006, Luecke opposed a private group's plan to create short line railroad named the South Bend Railway by acquiring and refurbishing a former Norfolk Southern rail line running through the city's west side. The plan would have seen the railway utilize the track for freight service, with the potential of having passenger services utilize it in the future to transport football spectators directly to the campus of Notre Dame University. Luecke cited safety and quality-of-life concerns for residents that live near the tracks in his opposition.

=== Other ===
Luecke worked to reduce the size of the city's government through staff reductions.

In 2005, when it appeared that the South Bend Silver Hawks were potentially leaving the city, Luecke pledged to make strong effort to keep minor league baseball in South Bend. Ultimately, a leadership group led by Joe Kernan stepped up to buy the team and keep it in the city.

In August 2009, Luecke announced an alliance between the city's five largest medical providers.

Luecke appointed many ethnic minorities to offices, including having African American appointees all heading the largest city departments during part of his tenure.

== Post-mayoralty ==
From 2013 until his retirement in 2017, Luecke was the executive director of the South Bend Alumni Association, which raises money to benefit South Bend schools. After retiring as executive director, he was named the association's board of trustees.

Luecke participated in developing the Near Northwest Neighborhood Quality of Life Plan in 2013 for Near Northwest Neighborhood, Inc.

In July 2014, Luecke joined his mayoral predecessor Joe Kernan and other South Bend community leaders in holding a press conference condemning the conduct of the South Bend Common Council.

Luecke serves as a commissioner on the Housing Authority of South Bend board. During part of his tenure on the board, he has served as its vice president.

In the 2019 South Bend mayoral election, Luecke endorsed his former special assistant Lynn Coleman in his, ultimately unsuccessful, bid for the Democratic nomination.

In November 2022, the City of South Bend added Luecke's name to the names of Brownfield Park and the Coal Line Trail, which were rededicated after him. Luecke is only the fourth mayor in the city to have a park named after him.

== Electoral history ==
=== Mayoral ===
1999

1999 South Bend Democratic mayoral primary
Party	Candidate	Votes	%
Democratic	Stephen J. Luecke (incumbent)	8,265	61.49
Democratic	John Voorde	4,214	31.35
Democratic	Kevin C. Horton	855	6.36
Democratic	Zbigniew "Ziggy" Borowski	108	0.80
Total votes		13,442	100

1999 South Bend mayoral election
Party	Candidate	Votes	%
Democratic	Stephen J. Luecke (incumbent)	13,678	68.39
Republican	Steven Bradley	6,321	31.61
Total votes		19,999	100

2003

2003 South Bend Democratic mayoral primary
Party	Candidate	Votes	%
Democratic	Stephen J. Luecke (incumbent)	7,480	100
Total votes		7,480	100

2003 South Bend mayoral election
Party	Candidate	Votes	%
Democratic	Stephen J. Luecke (incumbent)	10,598	71.68
Republican	Thomas R. Schmidt	4,188	28.32
Total votes		14,786	100

2007

2007 South Bend Democratic mayoral primary
Party	Candidate	Votes	%
Democratic	Stephen J. Luecke (incumbent)	4,781	79.12
Democratic	William F. Davis	1,262	20.88
Total votes		6,043	100

2007 South Bend mayoral election
Party	Candidate	Votes	%
Democratic	Stephen J. Luecke (incumbent)	12,355	62.14
Republican	Juan A. Manigault	7,471	37.57
Green	Thomas Eugene Brown (write-in)	58	0.29
Total votes		19,884	100

Political offices
Preceded by Joe Kernan (tenure)	Mayor of South Bend, Indiana; 1997-2012	Succeeded by Pete Buttigieg (tenure)
