= Morningside Club Residence =

- Formerly listed on the U.S. National Register of Historic Places
- Location: 413 W. Colfax, South Bend, Indiana
- Area: less than one acre
- Built: 1925
- MPS: Downtown South Bend Historic MRA
- NRHP reference No.: 85001224

Significant dates
- Added to NRHP: June 5, 1985
- Removed from NRHP: January 24, 1989

Morningside Club Residence was a historic residential hotel building located at South Bend, Indiana. It was built in 1925, and was a four-story, U-shaped brick and terra cotta building. A commercial addition to the building was constructed in 1926. It was destroyed by fire on December 18, 1988. Before its destruction, the building held 105 rooms. The fire left one dead, nine injured, and over one hundred people displaced.

It was listed on the National Register of Historic Places in 1985, and delisted in 1989.
