= Roger Parent (mayor) =

American politician

29th Mayor of South Bend
- In office January 1980 – January 1988
- Preceded by: Peter Nemeth
- Succeeded by: Joe E. Kernan

President of the South Bend Common Council

Member of the South Bend Common Council
- In office 1972–1980

Personal details
- Born: January 22, 1939 (age 87)
- Party: Democratic
- Spouse: Rolande Ouellette

Roger O. Parent (born January 22, 1939) is an American politician who served as the 29th mayor of South Bend, Indiana.

== Early life and education ==
Parent was born Grand Isle, Maine. He attended elementary school in Grand Isle, Maine. He graduated from Van Buren Boys High School salutatorian of his class.

Parent attended St. Francis Xavier University, where he graduated in 1961 magna cum laude with a bachelor's degree in economics.

From October 1961 through October 1963, Parent served in the Peace Corps. He was a member of the inaugural class of Peace Corps volunteers. He served in Thailand Group 1 for the duration of his service. He taught carpentry at Udorn Trade School and ESL at a Girls’ Handicraft School. He also served as a volunteer field leader.

Parent then attended the University of Notre Dame, from which he graduated in 1966 with a master's degree in education.

== Early career ==
From 1967 through 1970, Parent was the executive director of the South Bend chapter of Neighborhood Development Centers. From 1971 through 1979 Parent was the executive director of the South Bend Office of Catholic Charities.

From 1972 through 1980, Parent served as a member of the South Bend Common Council. For five of his eight years on the Common Council, he was its president.

== Mayoralty ==
Parent was first elected mayor of South Bend in 1979, and was reelected to a second term as mayor in 1983.

Parent was sworn in as mayor in January 1980.

Parent prioritized economic development. He sought to increase employment and the city's tax base by providing direct assistance to new commercial and industrial development. He also sought to indirectly encourage new economic ventures by improving the city's amenities, particularly in its downtown area.

Among the key projects of Parent's mayoralty was the construction of the East Race Waterway whitewater facility. The idea for this project had predated Parent's tenure as mayor, and had been supported by his predecessor Peter J. Nemeth during the later part of his tenure. Ground broke on the project in 1982, and it was opened in 1984. The project had faced fierce opposition from "Fair Tax", a small citizen's association of St. Joseph County taxpayers. The opposition particularly dealt with the municipal bond issue Parent was pushing to fund the construction of the raceway along with several other projects. Fair Tax operated an opposition effort under the name "Citizens Information Exchange". Originally asking for a $5.6 million bond issue to fund not only the waterway, but also additional projects, Parent ultimately settled for a $3.2 million bond just to fund the waterway.

Another key project he successfully championed in his first term was the construction of a $141 million ethanol plant on the far west side of the city, which was designed to employ 150 people. The ethanol plant also faced opposition from "Fair Tax".

In his first term, most of his redevelopment efforts were especially focused on the east side of South Bend's downtown business district.

A key project of Parent's second term was the funding and the construction of Coveleski Stadium.

Parent had advertised the stadium as being a generator that would contribute to the development of the nearby "Studebaker Corridor", which he argued would be key for the redevelopment city's southwest quadrant. He announced plans for the stadium in March 1985. The stadium received some notable opposition from citizens and groups, including Fair Tax. The stadium was built, despite this opposition.

As mayor, Parent believed that underutilized land at the 220-acre former site of the Studebaker's plant (located in the "Studebaker Corridor") could be a key asset in attracting new business and industry. However, this area did not see significant development during Parent's mayoralty, and would only far later see developments in the 2000s with the creation of such projects as Ignition Park.

In 1987, South Bend hosted the Special Olympics World Games in conjunction with the nearby University of Notre Dame, with Parent playing a role. After the games, Roger Parent pitched Special Olympics founders Eunice Kennedy Shriver and Sargent Shriver on the idea of establishing an "International Special Olympics Sports Hall of Fame" in South Bend. He also supported a proposal that would have renamed Island Park (located near Century Center in the city's downtown) to "Special Olympics Park" in commemoration of the games, and in October 1987 the city's Board of Public Works implemented such a name change.

As mayor, Parent also created several task forces, councils, and commissions, and organizations, including the Task Force on Literacy, Council on Minority Affairs, Council on Older Adults, Commission on Energy Conservation, and the Business Development Corporation.

During his tenure, Parent made a few hires which were the first for the city in regards to diversity. This included the city's first female city attorney, first African American fire chief, and first female director of code enforcement.

Parent announced he would not run for a third term in the 1987 election. Rumors arose that this decision was precipitated by controversy surrounding the construction of Coveleski Stadium, and poor internal polling results for his prospects of reelection. Parent was succeeded as mayor by Joe E. Kernan in 1988.

== Post-mayoralty ==
Immediately after leaving office as mayor, Parent returned to his work with the Peace Corps, serving as the Country Director for Haiti and Eastern Caribbean from January 1988 through June 1990. He also served in positions in the Peace Corps in Bulgaria and Grenada.

In the early 1990s, Parent worked as the Deputy Commissioner of the Indiana Department of Mental Health.

Parent served as director of development for Priests of Holy Cross from 1994 through 2003.

From May 2005 through November 2005, Parent volunteered with the Crisis Corps in Thailand as a deputy director at the Tsunami Volunteer Center, working on the response to the 2004 Indian Ocean earthquake and tsunami.

In 2006, Parent and his wife Rolande Parent founded the international nonprofit World Dignity Inc. (WDI), for which he has served as president. The nonprofit aims to help the poor by offering such assistance as teacher and student scholarships. The nonprofit operates educational programs in South Bend, Thailand, and India.

For five years, from 2009 through 2014, Parent served on the school board of the South Bend Community School Corp. For part of his tenure, beginning in January 2011, he was the president of the school board.

Parent has also served on the Social Work Advisory Board of St. Mary's College, St. Frances Academy board of directors, advisory committee for the Coady International Institute at St. Francis Xavier University, retired Indiana Public Retirement Association, and REAL Services board of directors.

Parent supported Pete Buttigieg's, ultimately successful, candidacy for mayor of South Bend in 2011. Parent had endorsed Buttigieg at the start of his campaign.

In 2022 Parent released his memoir Getting Things Done: Stories of Leadership from the South Bend Mayor's Office to the School Board, the Peace Corps, and Beyond (ISBN 9780964400733).

== Personal life ==
Parent continues to reside in South Bend. Parent and his wife Rolande Parent (née Ouellette) have four children and six grandchildren.

Parent is fluent in French and English, with some understanding of Thai and Haitian Creole.

Parent is a hobbyist carpenter.
