= Century Center (South Bend) =

Convention center in Indiana, US

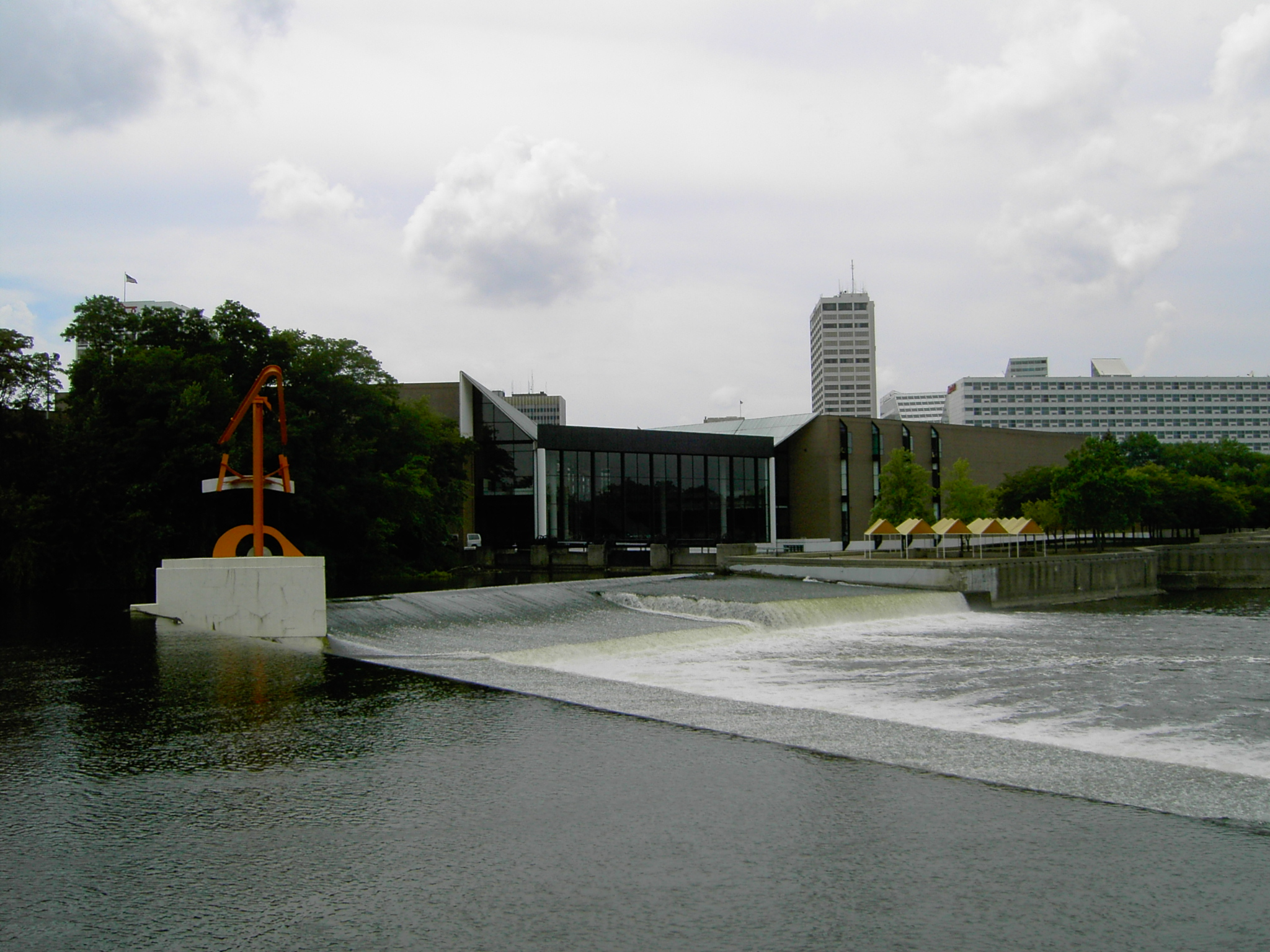
- The Century Center viewed from across the St. Joseph River. Also in the scene is the Mark di Suvero sculpture Keepers of the Fire, the West Race canal and Island Park
- Interactive map of the Century Center area

General information
- Location: 20 South Doctor M.L.K. Jr Boulevard, South Bend, Indiana, U.S.
- Coordinates: 41.676098°N 86.248145°W
- Opened: 1977

Technical details
- Size: Convention Hall: 25,000 sq ft (2,300 m^{2}); Discovery Ballroom: 12,000 sq ft (1,100 m^{2}); Great Hall: 16,000 sq ft (1,500 m^{2})

Design and construction
- Architects: Philip Johnson; John Burgee

The Century Center Convention Center, designed by architects Philip Johnson and John Burgee, broke construction in 1974 and opened in 1977, has been managed by SMG since July, 2013. The center, built on the banks of the West Race canal, overlooks the St. Joseph River in downtown South Bend, Indiana, United States. It features over 75,000 sq ft (7,000 m^{2}). of convention space and is home to Island Park, an 11-acre (45,000 m^{2}) riverfront park attached to the convention center via a cross walk over the West Race canal.

Century Center includes a 25,000 sq ft (2,300 m^{2}) Convention Hall that can be split into two smaller halls. This level also offers a 12,000 sq ft (1,100 m^{2}) Discovery Ballroom that can be separated into two equal halls.

Century Center Convention Center's 16,000 sq ft (1,500 m^{2}) Great Hall is includes a 30 ft (9.1 m) glass wall which overlooks the St. Joseph River. Eighteen meeting rooms, with over 35 combinations, complement the overall space. A pre-function area is located on the lower level adjacent to the Great Hall. A two-story high glass wall encompasses the Great Hall, with a view of the St. Joseph River.

The Century Center Convention Center provides access via an enclosed, climate-controlled skywalk to a 300-room DoubleTree hotel. It houses the South Bend Museum of Art and is connected by a tunnel to the former College Football Hall of Fame.

== Events ==
The Century Center Convention Center hosts events throughout the year, from consumer shows to conventions to corporate meetings to weddings. Some of the more notable open-to-public annual events include:

- Michiana Home Show
- Michiana Boat and Outdoor Show
- Valley RV & Camping Show
- International Jugglers Association hosted in 2023

The Century Center also hosts various events on a semi-regular basis, including the Heartland Travel Showcase next scheduled at the Center in March 2024.
