= Mayoralty of Pete Buttigieg =

2012–2020 mayoralty in South Bend, Indiana

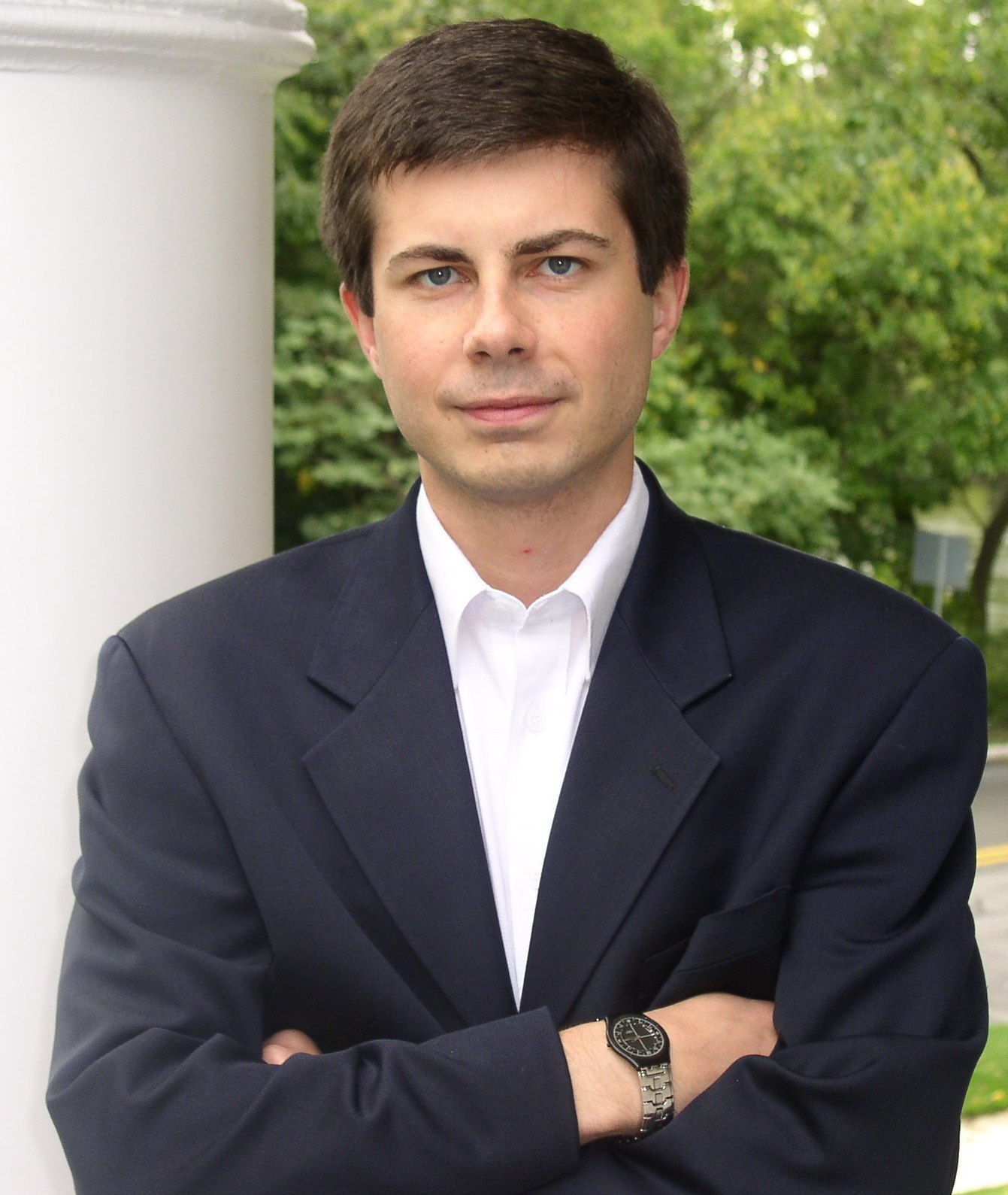
- Mayoralty of Pete Buttigieg; January 1, 2012 – January 1, 2020
- Mayor: Pete Buttigieg
- Party: Democratic
- Election: 2011; 2015

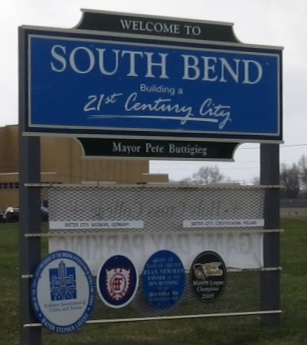
Road sign welcoming travelers to South Bend, advertising Buttigieg as mayor

Pete Buttigieg served as mayor of South Bend, Indiana from 2012 to 2020. Elected in 2011 as a Democrat, he took office in January 2012 at the age of 29, becoming the second-youngest mayor in South Bend history, and the youngest incumbent mayor, at the time, of a U.S. city with at least 100,000 residents. During his mayoralty, he acquired the nickname "Mayor Pete". Coming out as gay in 2015, Buttigieg became the first elected official in Indiana to come out while in office, as well as the highest-ranking Indiana elected official to come out. Buttigieg won reelection later that year. In 2017, Buttigieg unsuccessfully ran for chairman of the Democratic National Committee, pledging to resign as mayor if he had been elected. Buttigieg opted against running for reelection in 2019, instead launching a campaign for the Democratic presidential nomination in the 2020 United States presidential election. While he subsequently lost his bid for presidency, during his campaign he garnered a high national profile.

Buttigieg focused on urban development during his tenure as mayor. He supported numerous private developments. He also oversaw the sale of numerous city-owned properties to private owners. A key initiative of Buttigieg's first term was his Vacant and Abandoned Properties Initiative, also known as "1,000 Properties in 1,000 Days". This initiative reached its goal of repairing or demolishing 1,000 blighted properties across the city. In his second term, he completed two major infrastructure projects: a $150 million "Smart Sewer" project and a $25 million complete streets program named "Smart Streets" (the latter of which received national accolades). He also took a number of steps to commit the city of South Bend to greater environmental stewardship. This included creating the "Carbon Neutral 2050" plan for the city, which was adopted by the city council. After facing public pressure for the city to act, Buttigieg had the city collaborate with other entities to fund lead paint remediation efforts. He had previously argued that action on remediating levels of lead in South Bend was task for the state government and not the city government. Buttigieg launched a pilot program to provide residents with funding for home repairs, which he subsequently expanded into a larger program. He also funded improvements to city parks.

Buttigieg also established a city identification card program by executive order. Buttigieg promoted the idea of moving the city's South Shore Line station from South Bend International Airport to the city's downtown.

Buttigieg's early tenure had been marred by a scandal involving South Bend Police Department Chief Darryl Boykins illegally recording officers. This led to Buttigieg demoting Boykins, and ultimately asking for his resignation. The firing of the city's first African American police chief sparked backlash. Another controversy during Buttigieg's mayoralty was his actions regarding the opening crisis pregnancy center in South Bend. Buttigieg vetoed rezoning that would have allowed the center to open near an existing abortion clinic. However, he thereafter offered help in finding the crisis pregnancy center an alternate location to operate, with this latter action being criticized by some abortion rights organizations as inconsistent with Buttigieg's pro choice positions. He has also been criticized for South Bend's failure to diversify the racial makeup of its police force, something for which Buttigieg in 2019 conceded failure on his part.

== Election and transition ==
Buttigieg was elected mayor of South Bend in the November 2011 election, with 10,991 of the 14,883 votes cast (74%). In 2011, as South Bend's mayor-elect, Buttigieg supported John Broden in his successful bid to become St. Joseph County Democratic Party chairman. Buttigieg took office on January 1, 2012, at the age of 29, becoming the second-youngest mayor in South Bend history (Schuyler Colfax III had become mayor in 1898 at the age of 28), and the youngest incumbent mayor, at the time, of a U.S. city with at least 100,000 residents. Buttigieg was sworn in on January 1, 2012, by former congressman Romano Mazzoli at Century Center.

== First term ==
=== Housing, urban development and blight removal initiatives ===
One of Buttigieg's priorities upon entering office was to attract new development to the city. His efforts saw success, and by the end of his two terms hundreds of millions of dollars of new development had come to the city.

In February 2012, soon after taking office, in order to address allegations of improperly awarded contracts and misallocated funds in the Housing Authority of South Bend, Buttigieg and the board of the housing authority requested that the United States Department of Housing and Urban Development conduct a "full audit and investigation" In 2013, federal officials outlined "dire" mismanagement and financial problems, and faulted the board with failure to provide proper oversight to the agency and catch its problems. In October 2014, after the board failed to present a plan to resolve the agency's problems, the federal officials encouraged Buttigieg to take initiative actions, including recommending that he explore "the possibility of replacing all or some existing board members". In January 2015, after all six of the board's members either resigned or saw their terms expire, Buttigieg appointed six new members.

As mayor, Buttigieg promoted the transformation of the former Studebaker plant location into a technology park named Ignition Park. He also supported the development of the "Renaissance District" located near the technology park.

Buttigieg was involved in the creation of a nightly laser-light display along downtown South Bend's St. Joseph River trail as public art. The project cost $700,000, which was raised from private funds. The "River Lights" installation was unveiled in May 2015 as part of the city's 150th anniversary celebrations.

By the end of Buttigieg's first term, South Bend had sold off 71 city-owned properties. An example was the former Bendix Corporation headquarters and factory, which the city sold to Curtis Products in 2014. In late 2014 and early 2015, South Bend negotiated the sale of the city-owned Blackthorn Golf Course. The LaSalle Hotel was sold to developers in 2015 for conversion into apartments. Also in 2015, the city sold the former site of the College Football Hall of Fame to JSK Hospitality.

One of Buttigieg's signature programs was the Vacant and Abandoned Properties Initiative. Known locally as "1,000 Properties in 1,000 Days", it was a project that aimed to repair or demolish blighted properties across South Bend. In late September, Buttigieg announced that the program had reached its goal three months before its scheduled end date in November 2015, declaring that more than 1,000 homes had either been demolished or refurbished. By the thousandth day of the program, before Buttigieg's first term ended, the city was reporting that more than 1,000 homes had either been demolished or repaired. While there were no reports of family's being evicted due to the program, some locals who had acquired blighted properties with the intent of repairing them were dismayed that their properties stood at risk of code-enforcement fines or condemnation. The majority of properties impacted by the program were in West Side neighborhoods with sizable black and Hispanic populations. In 2019, Buttigieg would acknowledge that many of the homes demolished had been in communities of color, and that this had led to early distrust between his administration and these communities.

Buttigieg set aside $2 million in his 2014 budget to create comprehensive plans for corridors along Lincoln Way West and Western Avenue. This would lead to improvements that began to be implemented in 2019.

=== Policing ===
South Bend adopted the National Network for Safe Communities' Group Violence Intervention approach in 2014, launching the South Bend Group Violence Intervention program.

During Buttigieg's first term, the city's police force continued to struggle with a high homicide rate, a problem which preceded his tenure. The annual number of murders in South Bend was 18 in 2012, 9 in 2013, 17 in 2014, and 7 in 2015.

==== Darryl Boykins ====
In 2012, after a federal investigation ruled that South Bend police had illegally recorded telephone calls of several officers, Buttigieg demoted police chief Darryl Boykins. Boykins had first been appointed in 2008 by Mayor Stephen Luecke and reappointed by Buttigieg earlier in 2012. Buttigieg also dismissed the department's communications director, the one who had actually "discovered the recordings but continued to record the line at Boykins' command". The police communications director alleged that the recordings captured four senior police officers making racist remarks and discussing illegal acts. The city is 26% black, but only 6% of the police force is black. Buttigieg has written that his "first serious mistake as mayor" came shortly after taking office in 2012, when he decided to ask for Boykins's resignation. The city's first ever African American police chief accepted the request. However, the next day, backed by supporters and legal counsel, Boykins requested reinstatement. When Buttigieg denied this request, Boykins sued South Bend for racial discrimination, making the argument that such a taping policy had been present under previous white police chiefs. Buttigieg settled the suits brought by Boykins and the four officers out of court for over $800,000. A federal judge ruled in 2015 that Boykins's recordings violated the Federal Wiretap Act. He called for the eradication of racial bias in the police force. Buttigieg's handling of the matter, including his ousting of Boykins, was seen as hurting his relationship with the city's African American community.

During his 2020 presidential campaign, Buttigieg came under pressure from political opponents to release the tapes, but said that doing so would be a violation of the Wiretap Act. Since 2012, the South Bend Common Council (city council) had been fighting in court for the mayors' office to comply with a subpoena of the police department that the council had issued for the audio recordings in question. The subpoena had been issued to facilitate their investigation of Boykins' removal as police chief. However, the officers' featuring in the recordings have fought the Common Council in court to block the public release. In April 2019, St. Joseph Superior Court Judge Steven Hostetler ruled that the effort by the Common Council to obtain the tapes had legal merit warranting a trial. On May 10, 2021, St. Joseph Superior Court Judge Steven Hostetler further held that the officers lacked legal standing to prevent the council from being given the recordings. The officers appealed the ruling in a brief filed with the Indiana Court of Appeals. The appeals court reversed Hostetler's ruling; instead finding that the officers had standing. This opened the possibility of a trial to block the release. In August 2022, the Common Council filed an appeal to the Indiana Supreme Court. In January 2023, the Indiana Supreme Court refused to hear the appeal, allowing the Appeals Court's holding to stand, and clearing the path for a trial to decide on the possible release of the tapes.

=== Other civic matters ===
In June 2012, fulfilling a campaign promise, Buttigieg hosted an economic summit for the city.

In his first year of office, Buttigieg oversaw an update of the city's phone and email systems as well as a redesign of the city's website. In 2013, Buttigieg oversaw the city's launching of a 3-1-1 system.

In May 2013, the city put in place its first shared lane marking for cyclists.

In January 2013, Buttigieg joined the national group Mayors Against Illegal Guns.

Buttigieg took some steps to address the city's environmental impact in his first term. In 2014, Buttigieg reconvened the city's Green Ribbon Commission. This had first been established in 2009 by his predecessor, Luecke, to assess ways to reduce city's negative impact on the environment. He also created an Office of Sustainability within the city's Energy Office.

In his budget proposal for the 2014 fiscal year, Buttigieg proposed combining South Bend's Code Enforcement, Animal Control, and Building Department into a single Department of Building Services to save costs and improve efficiency. The proposal failed, and the three have remained separate departments.

=== Service in Afghanistan ===
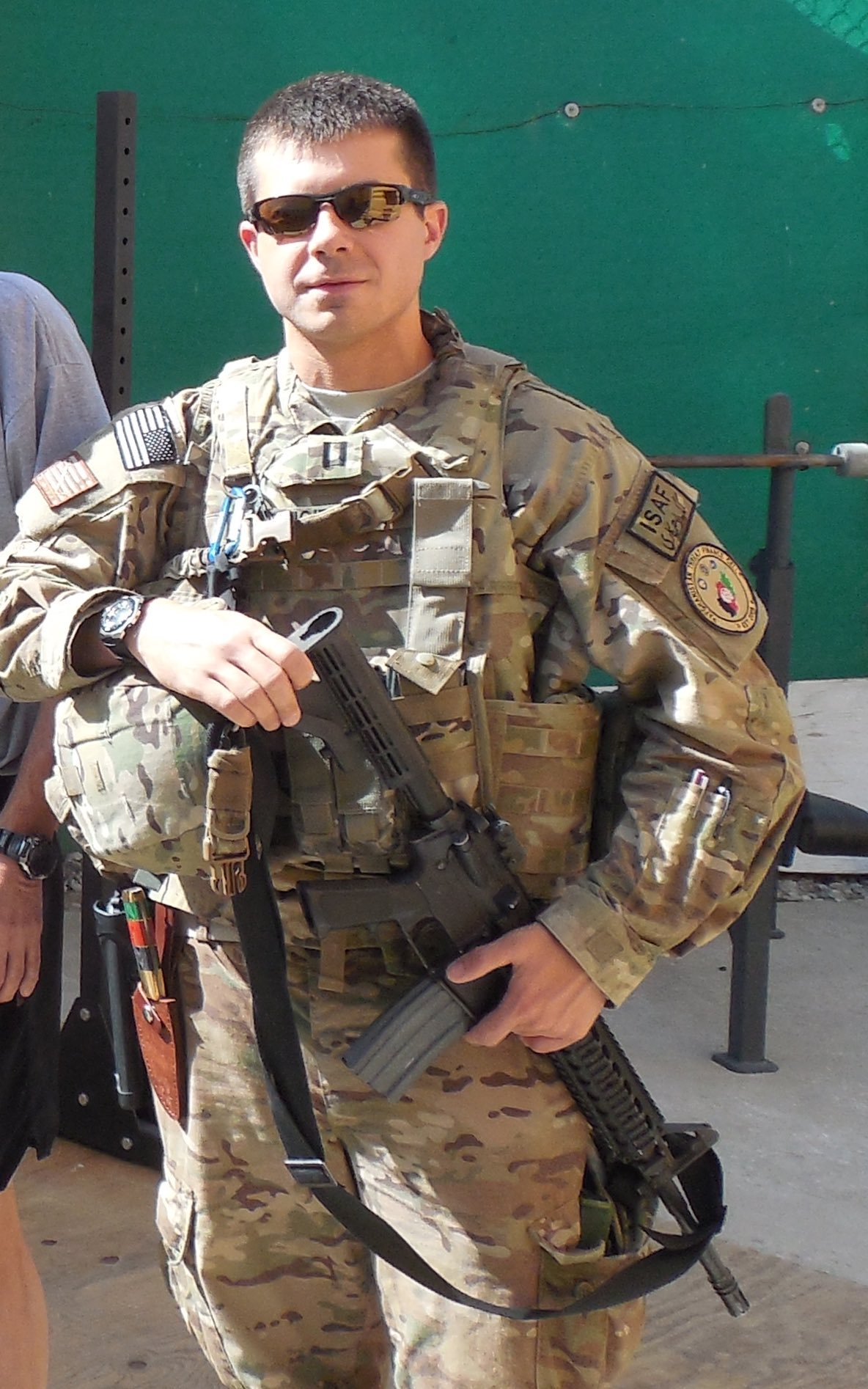
Buttigieg during his military service in Afghanistan

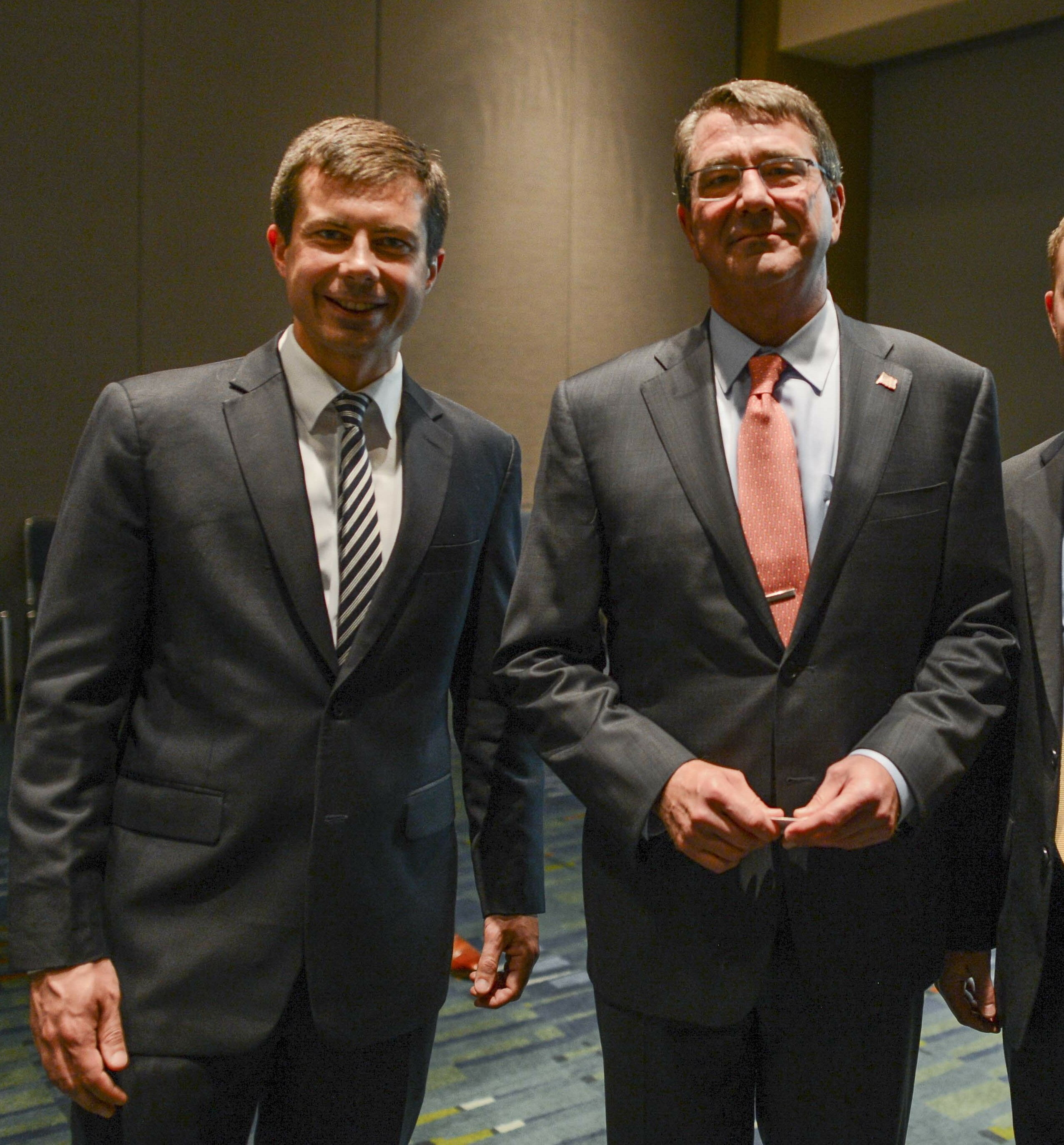
Buttigieg (left) meeting with U.S. Secretary of Defense Ash Carter at the 2015 convention of the National Association of Counties

Buttigieg served for seven months in Afghanistan as a lieutenant in the U.S. Navy Reserve, returning to the United States on September 23, 2014. While deployed, he was assigned to the Afghan Threat Finance Cell, a counterterrorism unit that targeted Taliban insurgency financing. In his absence, Deputy Mayor Mark Neal, South Bend's city comptroller, served as executive from February 2014 until Buttigieg returned to his role as mayor in October 2014.

=== RFRA opposition and coming-out ===
In 2015, during the controversy over Indiana Senate Bill 101 (titled the "Religious Freedom Restoration Act")—which was widely criticized for allowing discrimination against lesbian, gay, bisexual, and transgender people—Buttigieg emerged as a leading opponent of the legislation. Amid his reelection campaign, in a June 2015 piece published in the South Bend Tribune, he came out as gay to express his solidarity with the LGBTQ community. By coming out, Buttigieg became Indiana's first openly gay elected executive. He was the first elected official in Indiana to come out while in office, and the highest elected official in Indiana to come out.

== Second term ==
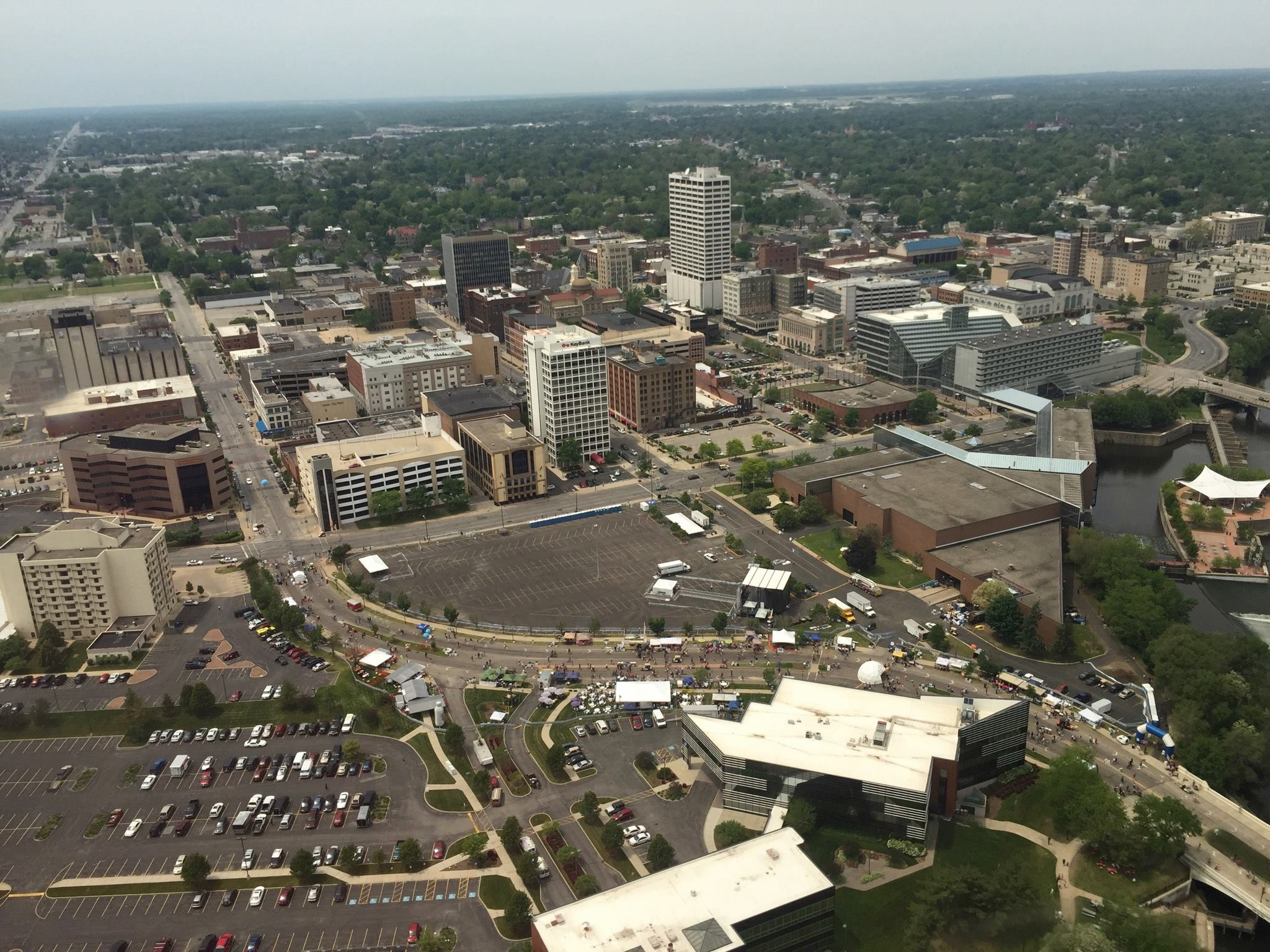
The South Bend 150th Anniversary festivities, where Buttigieg performed live with singer-songwriter Ben Folds

=== Reelection in 2015 ===
In 2014, Buttigieg announced that he would seek a second term in 2015. He won the Democratic primary with 78% of the vote, defeating Henry Davis Jr., the city councilman from the second district. In November 2015, he was elected to his second term as mayor with over 80% of the vote, defeating Republican Kelly Jones by a margin of 8,515 to 2,074 votes.

=== Environment ===
In 2017, Buttigieg signed onto Climate Mayors' statement in response to President Donald Trump's decision to withdraw the United States from the Paris Agreement. Also in 2017, Buttigieg signed onto "We Are Still In", voicing South Bend's commitment to the goals of the Paris Agreement. In 2018, he joined the Global Covenant of Mayors for Climate and Energy. Also in 2018, Buttigieg signed the "Pledge to Repower Indiana" letter, urging utility companies to supply 100% clean energy.

In 2019, Buttigieg signed onto the "Mayors for Solar Energy" letter resolving to make solar power a key element of the city. In April 2021, more than a year after he left office, the city of South Bend would be awarded "Gold" designation by the group SolSmart (their highest designation) in recognition of its efforts in easing the adoption of solar power for its residential and commercial buildings.

In April 2019, the South Bend Common Council approved Buttigieg's request to enable his administration to develop a city climate plan. That month Buttigieg contracted with the Chicago firm Delta Institute to develop a plan. In late November 2019, the Common Council voted 7–0 to approve the resultant "Carbon Neutral 2050" plan, setting the goal of meeting the Paris Agreement's 26% emission reduction by 2025, and aiming for a further reductions of 45% by 2035.

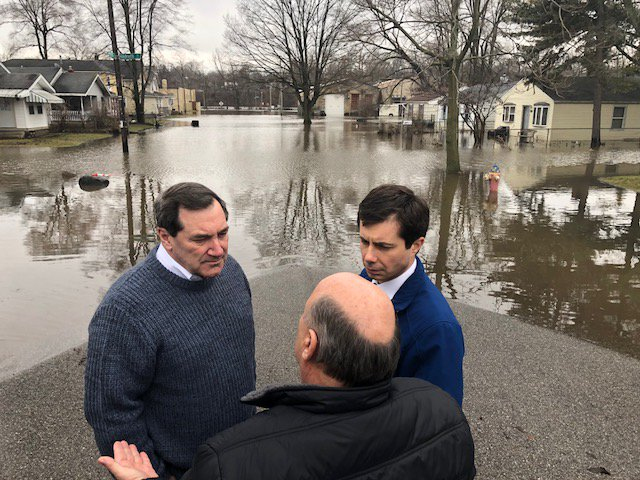
Buttigieg (right) and Senator Joe Donnelly (left) tour flood-impacted areas of South Bend in February 2018. Buttigieg would later express a view attributing the flood to climate change's impact on extreme weather events

Buttigieg, in a February 2019 appearance on The Late Show with Stephen Colbert promoting his exploration of a presidential run, expressed a belief attributing to climate change's impact on extreme weather events the phenomenon of a 500-year flood impacting South Bend in 2018 only eighteen months after a 1,000-year flood impacted the city in 2016.

=== Housing and urban development ===
In a new phase of the Vacant and Abandoned Properties Initiative, South Bend partnered with the Notre Dame Clinical Law Center to provide free legal assistance to qualifying applicants wishing to acquire vacant lots and, with local nonprofits, to repair or construct homes and provide low-income home ownership assistance using South Bend HUD (Housing and Urban Development) funds. He increased city funding levels for home construction and improvement in the 2018 South Bend budget via several programs, including the UEA (Urban Enterprise Association) Pilot Home Repair Program, a grant intended to improve low-income residents' quality of life.

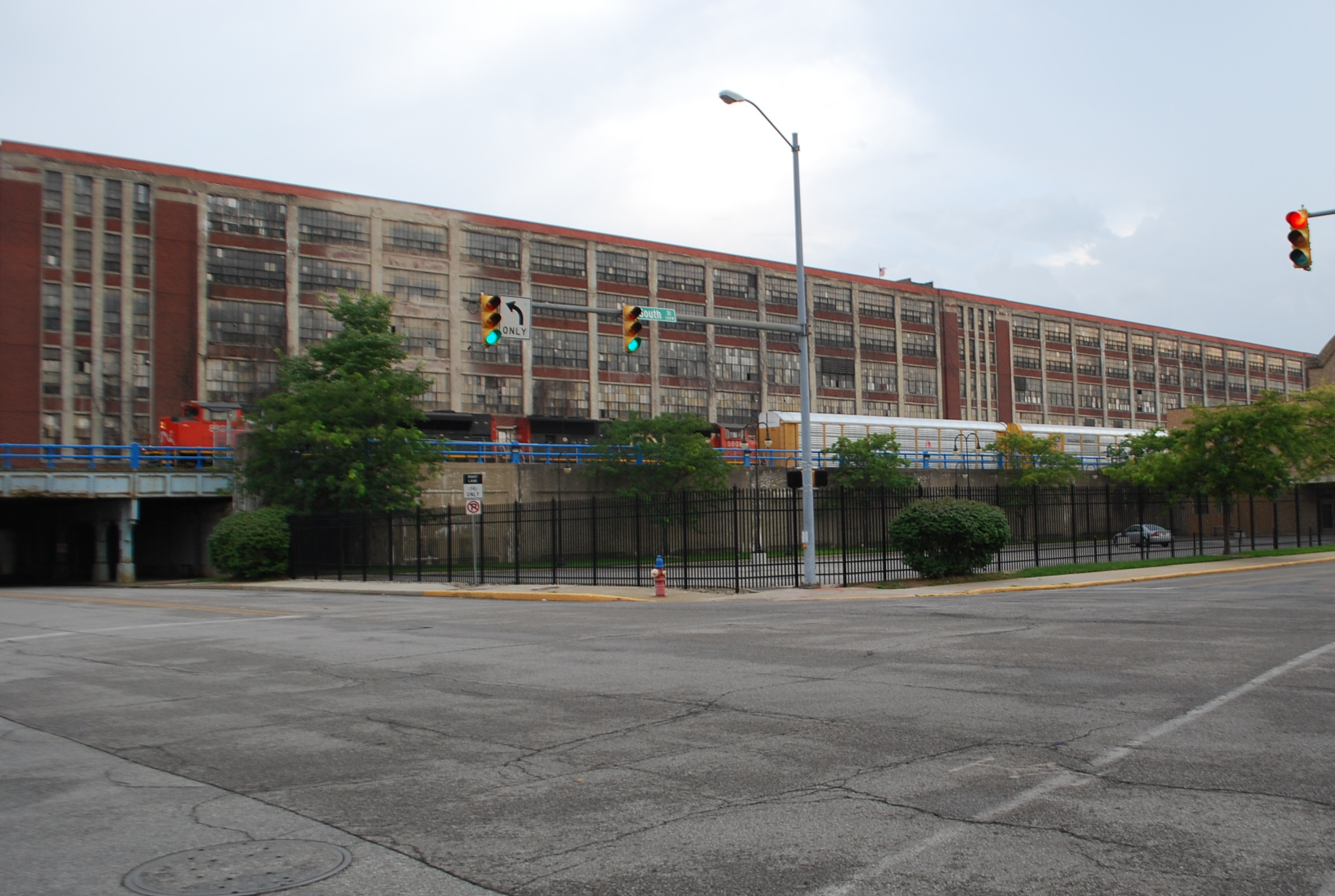
Photograph of Studebaker Building 84 circa 2014. In 2017, it was announced that its exterior would be renovated using state and city funding.

As a further part of the development of the city's "Renaissance District", in 2016, South Bend partnered with the State of Indiana and private developers to break ground on a $165 million renovation of the former Studebaker complex, with the aim of making the complex home to tech companies and residential condos. In 2017, it was announced that the long-abandoned Studebaker Building 84 (also known as "Ivy Tower") would have its exterior renovated with $3.5 million in Regional Cities funds from the State of Indiana and $3.5 million from South Bend tax increment financing, with plans for the building and other structures in its complex to serve as a technology hub.

While many aspects of South Bend had improved by 2016, a Princeton University study found that the rate of evictions in the city had worsened, more than doubling since Buttigieg took office.

Buttigieg supported a proposed high-rise development in South Bend's East Bank neighborhood that would greatly exceed the existing height ordinances. In the weeks after the Common Council voted against the development in December 2016, Buttigieg and his administration negotiated a new compromise plan with the developer, Matthews LLC, that reduced the height from twelve stories to nine. In January 2017, the Common Council voted to approve a ten-year tax abatement for the $35 million development. In February, the Common Council raised the height limits for the East Bank neighborhood to facilitate the development. The city later committed $5 million in tax increment financing to the project.

In 2017, after complaints from downtown business owners about a homeless encampment that had formed under the Main Street railroad viaduct, Buttigieg assembled a 22-member task force to develop recommendations to prevent such encampments from forming. The task force's report recommended a gateway center and permanent supportive housing project, which would have a "housing first" approach that would provide immediate shelter regardless of behavioral or substance abuse issues. However, this project was scrapped by the city, due to an inability to find a location due to NIMBYism. Those living near prospective locations had opposed the establishment of such a facility near their properties. The city instead opted to attempt a scattered-site housing approach with participating landlords.

Poorer neighborhoods of South Bend were shown to have a high incidence of lead poisoning among its youth. Buttigieg was originally reluctant to tackle the issue himself, arguing citizens should pressure the state government to act. However, after pressure from citizens groups, as well as an editorial in the South Bend Tribune urging him to act, Buttigieg worked to address the problem. The city, in 2017, committed $100,000, contingent on the city also receiving a roughly $3 million grant from the United States Department of Housing and Urban Development to address the problem. The city, however, had their grant application rejected. By late 2017, Buttigieg's administration was partnering with a private group to address the problem. In December 2018, Buttigieg announced that the city government, in partnership with the St. Joseph County Health Department, had received $2.3 million from the United States Department of Housing and Urban Development to remediate residences with lead paint.

In November 2017, at the Buttigieg administration's recommendation, the South Bend Common Council approved a property tax abatement for a planned $9 million five-story office building. The building would break ground in April 2019, marking the first new construction in the city's business core in over two decades.

Buttigieg's budget proposal for the 2018 fiscal year included items to address various public health concerns, including funding for a "healthy homes" program, which was ultimately included in the 2018 budget approved by the Common Council.

In September 2018, Buttigieg voiced concern about a number of issues regarding the Housing Authority of South Bend, calling for reforms to be made. The following month, he presented its board with a letter outlining several problems, and declaring that the Housing Authority of South Bend had risen to the "top tier of priorities for my administration, and will receive sustained attention from my office for the balance of my time as mayor."

In January 2019, Buttigieg launched the South Bend Home Repair initiative. This expanded the existing South Bend Home Repair Pilot, which helps make available funds to assist residents with home repairs, through the use of $600,000 in city funding (double what the city had earlier pledged to the program) and $300,000 in block grants. It also created two new programs. The first of these is the South Bend Green Corps, which makes funds available to lower-income homeowners for such uses as energy-saving measures and basic weatherization, the installation of smoke and carbon monoxide detectors, lead tests, and energy bill review. It also provides education on reducing energy bills. The South Bend Green Corps was funded with $290,000 from the city and $150,000 from AmeriCorps. The second program is Love Your Block, which assists citizen groups and local nonprofits in revitalizing neighborhoods, and which was funded with $25,000 from the city and $25,000 from the nonprofit Cities of Service.

Hundreds of millions of dollars of private investment came to the city during Buttigieg's mayoralty, though estimates vary as to just how much. By one account in early 2019, more than $200 million in developments occurred since Buttigieg had taken office. By another account around the same time, the city had seen $374 million in private investment for mixed-use developments since Buttigieg had taken office. By another account, during Buttigieg's tenure, Downtown South Bend alone had seen roughly $200 million in private investment.

=== Infrastructure and transportation ===
In 2013, Buttigieg proposed a "Smart Streets" urban development program to improve South Bend's downtown area, and in early 2015—after traffic studies and public hearings—he secured a $25 million bond issue for the program backed by tax increment financing. Smart Streets was a complete streets implementation program. Smart Streets was aimed at improving economic development and urban vibrancy as well as road safety. The project involved the conversion of one-way streets in downtown to two-way streets, traffic-calming measures, the widening of sidewalks, streetside beautification (including the planting of trees and installation of decorative brickwork), the addition of bike lanes and the introduction of roundabouts. Elements of the project were finished in 2016, and it was officially completed in 2017. The project was credited with spurring private development in the city. In 2016, the project received the national awards for "Complete Streets" and "Overall Success" at the United States Department of Transportation's Safer People, Safer Streets Summit.

Under Buttigieg, the city also began a "Smart Sewer" program, the first phase of which was finished in 2017 at a cost of $150 million. The effort utilized federal funds and by 2019 had reduced the combined sewer overflow by 75%. The impetus for the effort was a fine that the EPA had levied against the city in 2011 for Clean Water Act violations. However, Buttigieg also, in 2019, sought for the city to be released from an agreement with the EPA brokered under his mayoral predecessor Steve Luecke, in which South Bend had agreed to make hundreds of millions dollars in further improvements to its sewer system by 2031.

Buttigieg was involved in bringing a bike sharing service run by LimeBike to the city. The service launched in July 2017 as a pilot program. South Bend was the third American city in which LimeBike had launched operations. It was reported that, within the service's first year, it saw 290,000 individual rides. In 2019, Lime withdrew its service from the city amid the company's decision to end its bike sharing service in order to focus solely on scooter sharing. In October 2019, Buttigieg signed into law a comprehensive shared mobility ordinance. This ordinance would, among other things, give the city controller the power to order shared mobility vendors, similar to Lime, to designate locations where devices could be stored when not being used.

In 2018, South Bend was designated as a silver-level "Bike Friendly Community" by the League of American Bicyclists. South Bend was only the second city in the state of Indiana to receive the group's silver level "Bike Friendly Community" designation.

Effective July 22, 2017, the Federal Railroad Administration revoked the city's quiet zone on the very active tracks (Norfolk Southern's Chicago Line and Canadian National's South Bend Subdivision) that run through the city, demanding that median barriers be installed at roughly eleven grade crossings and that other deficiencies be remedied. This had come as a surprise to Buttigieg and the rest of the city government when it occurred on July 22, as the letter from the Federal Rail Administration giving prior notice to the city had been mistakenly addressed to a former city attorney that had been deceased for six years. Buttigieg worked to get quiet zones restored, making changes to railroad crossings. By September of that year, part of South Bend's quiet zone was restored. Buttigieg was able to get even more of the city's quiet zone restored, completing phase one of the city's quiet zone project by June 2019 on the west side of the city

South Bend's road infrastructure experienced issues with potholes. In 2018, Ed Stemmler of the South Bend Tribune wrote that the city's pothole situation at the time might have been the "worst in recent memory".

In September 2019, the city of South Bend finalized a long-anticipated agreement with St. Joseph County to jointly fund the county's $18 million share of the project to double-track portions of the South Shore Line. Buttigieg was a supporter of efforts to double-track the South Shore Line.

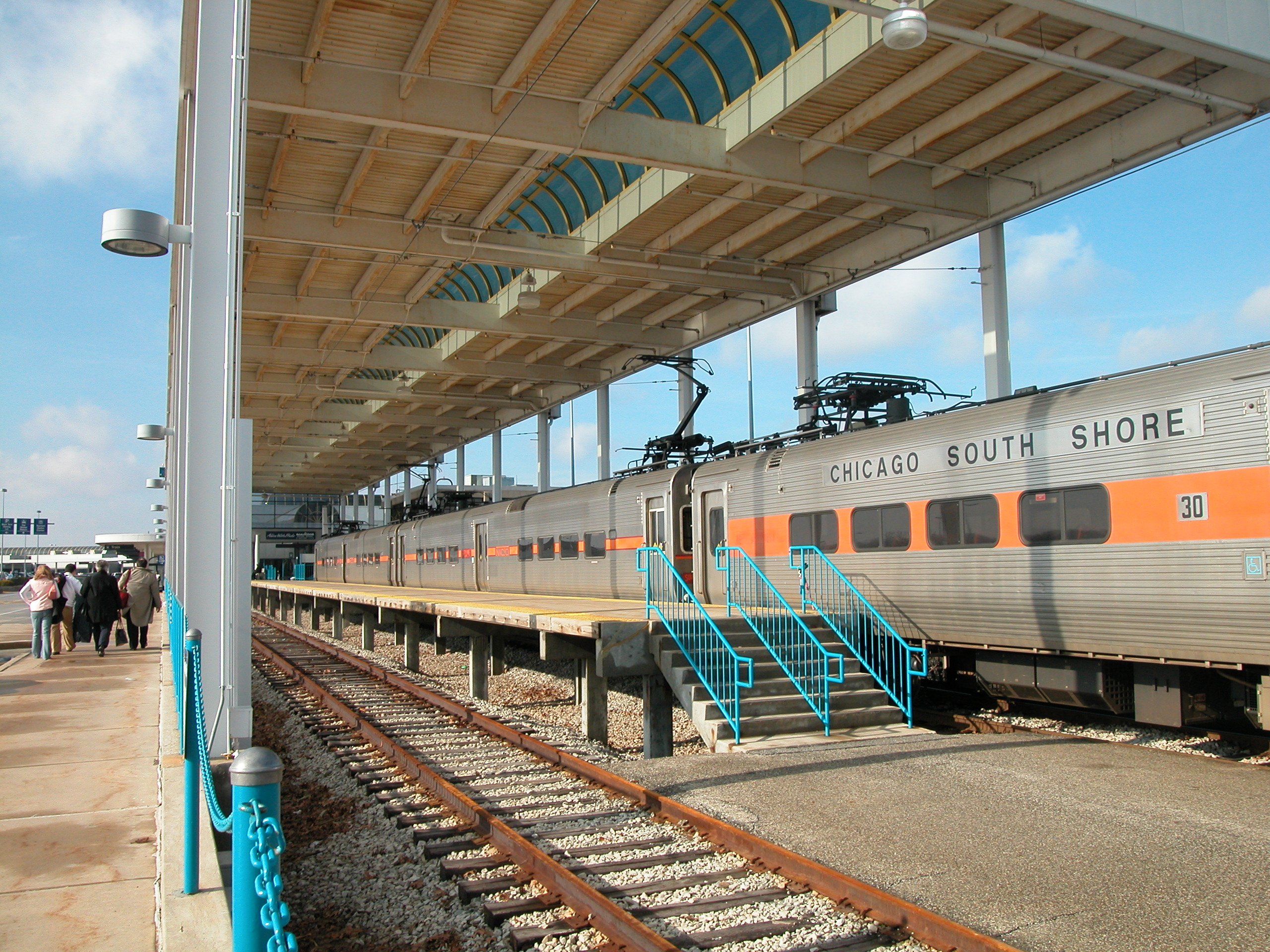
Buttigieg proposed moving the city's station on the South Shore Line

Beginning in August 2018, Buttigieg promoted the idea of moving the city's South Shore Line station from South Bend International Airport to the city's downtown. He made it a goal to have the city complete this project by 2025. Buttigieg's earlier budgets had allotted funding to the existing South Shore Relocation project, which would have moved the station to a different end of the South Bend International Airport. Buttigieg had, prior to advocating for a downtown station, been supportive of the existing plans to relocate the station to a different end of the airport. Buttigieg's new push for a downtown station engendered suggestions of other possible locations. Buttigieg ordered a study of five location options, including his personally preferred downtown option, as well as two that would keep the station at the airport. Of the five, the downtown location was found to be the priciest, but also the one with the greatest potential economic impact. In December 2018, an engineering study was commissioned to further examine the cost of a downtown station.

In 2019, South Bend launched Commuters Trust, a new transportation benefit program created in collaboration with local employers and transportation providers (including South Bend Transpo and Lyft). This program was made possible by a $1 million three-year grant from Bloomberg Philanthropies Mayors Challenge.

In his position as mayor of South Bend, Buttigieg shared authority over the bus system, South Bend Transpo, with the mayor of Mishawaka. After South Bend Transpo CEO David Cangany was fired in 2018 for both being abusive towards staff and charging personal expenditures to the transit agency, Buttigieg supported changes that the agency put in place to prevent these sorts of issues from recurring under any future CEO.

=== Parks and green spaces ===
In 2017, a new Venues Parks & Arts department was created in South Bend's government, merging two existing departments.

Under Buttigieg, South Bend invested $60 million in the city's parks, many of which had been neglected during the preceding decades. On August 23, 2017, the city's Venues Parks & Arts department first announced plans to spend $50 million on parks. It was planned that $19 million would come from private and outside funding, tax increment financing would cover $11 million, and $18 million would come from park bonds (both new and existing). The city ultimately secured $20 million in outside funding for parks investments, with money coming from such sources as the Indiana's Regional Cities initiative, the Community Foundation of St. Joseph County, the Pokagon Band of Potawatomi Indians, and the University of Notre Dame. Roughly one third of the investments in parks came from taxes collected from tax increment financing districts. The rest of the investment in parks came from taxes, still being collected, that had originally been created for the purposes of paying for the College Football Hall of Fame.

As part of the investment in parks, from 2018 to 2019, Howard Park, a riverfront park considered to be a centerpiece of the city's park system, underwent an $18.9 million renovation, with the city contributing part of the funding through TIF bonds, and the rest of the funding coming from donations. Howard Park's renovation was the largest expenditure of the city's park improvements. Other investments in parks included a $4.5 expansion and renovation of the Charles Black Community Center, a $900,000 renovation of the clubhouse at the Erskine Park Golf Course, and $2 million in improvements to bathrooms and playgrounds at 40 neighborhood parks. By the spring of 2019, multi-million dollar upgrades were planned for the city's trail system, as well as Leeper, Pinhook, and Pulaski parks.

Buttigieg made a request in his 2018 budget proposal for $24 million to fund new green spaces in the city that was ultimately excluded from the budget.

Buttigieg had arranged a deal under which the city's parks department would sell Elbel Golf Course to developers for $747,500. In January 2016, amid public pressure, the city dropped the plan. The idea had been floated in 2014, when the city was exploring selling the Blackthorn golf course, but began to gain momentum in 2015. Buttigieg had justified the plan to sell the city-owned golf course by claiming that residents found golf to be a low priority, that the course had failed to turn a profit for over five years, and that the city was subsidizing rounds of golf at about $2 per round. Buttigieg characterized the course as a drain on the city's finances. Opposition arose, with concerns that the sale would limit public access to the land and endanger the protection of wetlands surrounding it. At 313 acres (127 ha), Elbel is the largest park in the city's park system. While owned by the city, it is located outside of city boundaries. The original plan Buttigieg outlined for the sale would have allowed it to be developed freely by the buyer.

=== Police and fire services ===
In late September 2017, in his budget proposal for the 2020 fiscal year, Buttigieg sought Common Council approval to create the new position of Director of Public Safety, which would have oversight over the city's fire and police chiefs. Such a position had existed in South Bend during the mayoralties of Jerry Miller and Peter Nemeth; Nemeth eliminated the position in 1976. Buttigieg's budget proposal for the 2018 fiscal year earmarked $105,000 for the position's salary, which was more than the salary of the fire chief or police chief at the time. The plan was opposed by members of the fire and police forces, including the local Fraternal Order of Police lodge. Criticisms included claims that it was unfair to both the fire and police chiefs to create an additional layer of bureaucracy between them and the mayor. The Common Council rejected Buttigieg's proposal, and he rescinded the request. In late October 2019, it was announced that the South Bend Mayor's Office would have a slightly different new division, the Division of Community Initiatives. This was budgeted to be launched in 2020, when Buttigieg's successor would take office. Buttigieg supported this department's creation.

In September 2018, South Bend sent roughly 20 members of its fire department's Swift Water Rescue Group to Raleigh, North Carolina, to assist in anticipation of Hurricane Florence.

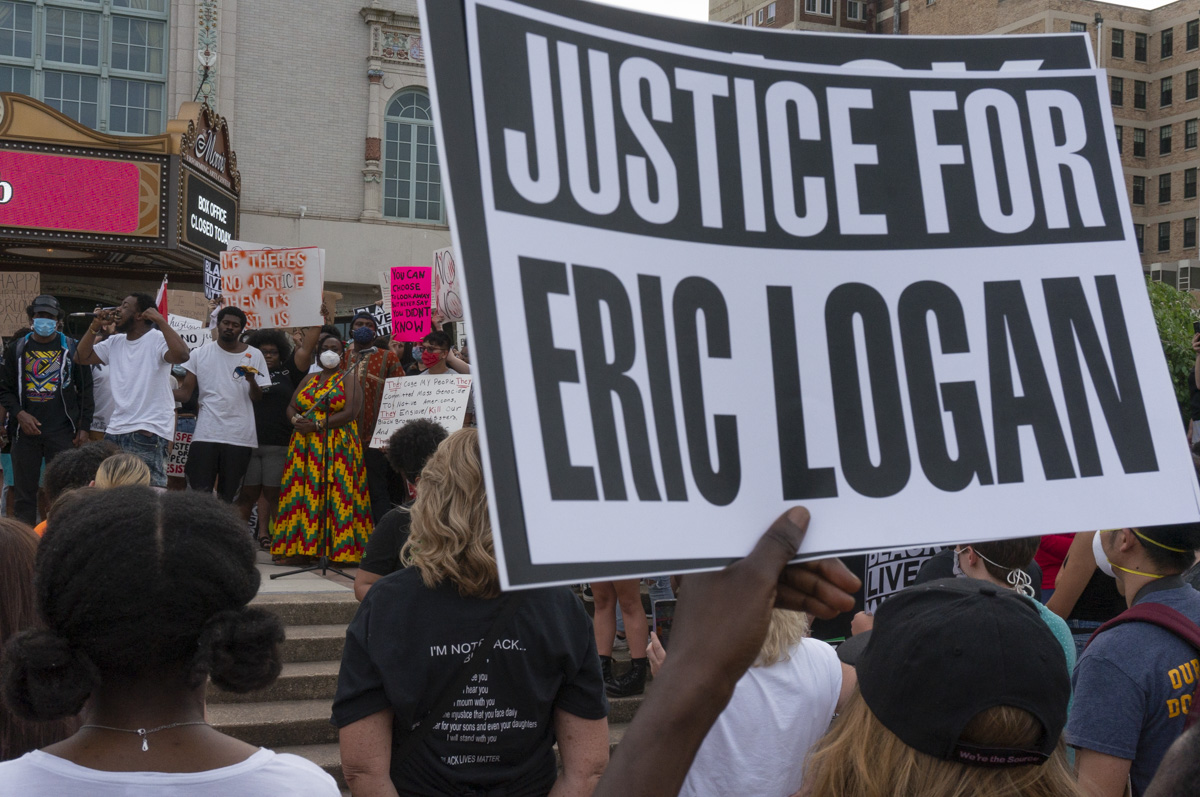
There was a strong public reaction to the police shooting of Eric Logan.

In June 2019, after Eric Logan, an African American man, was shot and killed by a white South Bend police officer, Buttigieg was drawn from his presidential campaign to focus on the emerging public reaction. Body cameras were not turned on during Logan's death. Soon after Logan's death, Buttigieg presided over a town hall attended by disaffected activists from the African-American community as well as relatives of the deceased man. The local police union accused Buttigieg of making decisions for political gain. Buttigieg, in the aftermath of the shooting, promised to give the city's police officers de-escalation training and to advocate for stronger discipline and accountability to be enforced by the police department on its officers. He also directed the police chief to order all of the city's police officers to keep their body cameras activated during all on-duty interactions with civilians. In November 2019, Buttigieg secured $180,000 to commission a review of South Bend's police department policies and practices to be conducted by Chicago-based consulting firm 21CP Solutions.

To address violence in the city, in the 2020 budget, Buttigieg and the Common Council set aside $300,000 in violence prevention grants.

During Buttigieg's second term, the city's police force continued to struggle with a high homicide count: 14 in 2016, 15 in 2017, and 13 in 2018.

During Buttigieg's mayoralty through 2019, the overall crime rate in the city decreased, largely due to a decline in some categories of property crime since 2012. However, the homicide and robbery rates remained roughly the same, and reports of assaults and motor vehicle theft saw large increases. While Buttigieg had attempted to address gun violence as mayor, the rate of shootings did not decline.

During a June 2019 Democratic presidential debate, Buttigieg said, "I couldn't get it done" when remarking on his inability as mayor to recruit a diversified police force. By the time he left office, the number of black officers on the police force of roughly 230 officers had fallen by half of what it had been when he took office to only fifteen.

=== Other matters ===
In 2016, Buttigieg signed an executive order helping to establish a recognized city identification card. The program is run in partnership with the nonprofit La Casa de Amistad, which produces the ID cards. A December 2016 executive order signed by Buttigieg required police, schools and other government services recognize the cards as a valid form of identification. The program formally launched later that month. Many immigration advocates praised the program's approach for protecting undocumented immigrants. In August 2019, Judicial Watch launched litigation arguing that, by not disclosing staff emails related to the program, the City of South Bend was acting in violation of Indiana's Access to Public Records Act. In the city's 2019 mayoral election, both the Democratic and Republican mayoral nominees voiced their support for retaining this program.

Buttigieg's budget proposal for the 2018 fiscal year included $156,000 for paid parental leave to city employees. He was successful in this effort.

Buttigieg had expressed his openness to a proposal by the Pokagon Band of Potawatomi Indians to open a tribal casino in South Bend. The Common Council approved a casino deal in April 2016, and the Pokagon Band received federal clearance to put the land into a required trust in November 2016. Under a revenue-sharing agreement that the Pokagon Band voluntarily entered into with the city, the city receives the greater of 2% of the casino's annual Class II gaming revenues or either $1 million or $2 million (depending on the number of games at the casino). The casino opened in January 2018 as Four Winds South Bend.

Buttigieg had the mayor's office commission a report to analyze racial economic inequality in the city. The report, dubbed the "Prosperity Now Report" was finished in 2017, and documented the existence of a pronounced racial wealth gap in the city.

In 2018, Women's Care Center, a crisis pregnancy center chain, petitioned the city to rezone a residential property where they sought to open a location. This location would be adjacent to a planned Whole Woman's Health abortion clinic (which would be the only abortion clinic in the city, which had been without one since 2015). The rezoning case became a flashpoint between local anti-abortion activists supporting the rezoning and abortion-rights activists opposing it. In April 2018, the city council voted 5–4 to allow the rezoning. The group Pro Choice South Bend, which opposed the rezoning, organized a letter-writing campaign and other efforts to urge Buttigieg to use his veto power to block the rezoning. Amid this, Buttigieg's office reportedly reached out to Whole Woman's Health Alliance and discussed various concerns. Four days after the Common Council's vote to approve the rezoning, Buttigieg vetoed it, in a decision he described as "one of the hardest decisions I've ever made" as mayor. In a letter to Common Council members, Buttigieg said he was persuaded by data provided by the abortion clinic showing that, at abortion clinics near crisis pregnancy centers, there were greater rates of harassment, threats, and violence. Buttigieg was careful not to criticize the crisis pregnancy center, writing that he believed that representatives of both the abortion clinic and the crisis pregnancy center "are good residents who seek to support women by providing services consistent with their values." In a press conference he held to explain his veto, he declared, "Issues on the morality or the legality of abortion are dramatically beyond my pay grade as mayor. For us this is a neighborhood issue, and it's a zoning issue." In mid-May 2018, Buttigieg said he was willing to work with Women's Care Center to find a different location in the area. Women's Care Center eventually opened at a location across the street from the planned abortion clinic. When Buttigieg ran for president, some criticized his assistance to Women's Care Center as a failure to stick strongly to his abortion-rights position.

Also in 2018, Buttigieg explored annexing several areas bordering the city and redrawing the boundaries of several of the city's tax increment financing districts to better serve neighborhoods that had not benefited from redevelopment.

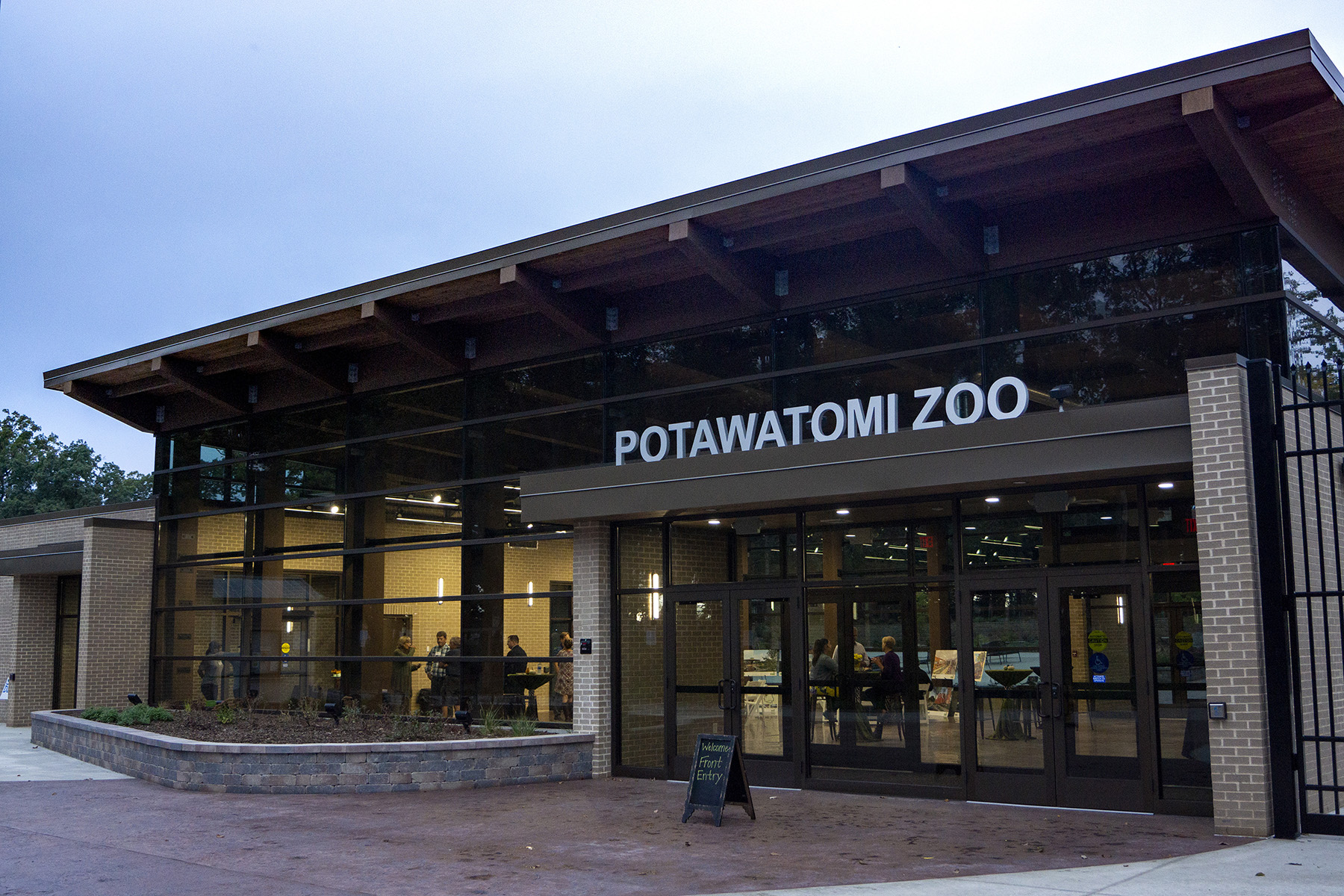
Buttigieg pledged a bond issue to assist in funding renovations to the Potawatomi Zoo.

In August 2018, South Bend pledged a $3.7 million bond issue to assist the Potawatomi Zoo in funding its renovations. In September, it was announced that the zoo renovation had obtained additional funding from the Indiana Economic Development Corporation's Regional Cities Initiative.

In August 2018, Buttigieg declared an intent to include a focus on neighborhoods in his budget proposal for the 2019 fiscal year. In addition to improvements to infrastructure, such as streetlights, Buttigieg also promoted the expansion of the city's Group Violence Intervention efforts, which he believed were showing success at reducing violent crime among the city's youth. The Common Council approved many of Buttigieg's requests in its 2019 budget.

==== Succession as mayor ====
In December 2018, Buttigieg announced that he would not seek a third term as mayor of South Bend. In February 2019, Buttigieg endorsed James Mueller in the 2019 South Bend mayoral election. Mueller was a high-school classmate of Buttigieg's and his mayoral chief of staff, and later executive director of the South Bend Department of Community Investment. Mueller's campaign promised to continue the progress that had been made under Buttigieg's mayoralty. Buttigieg appeared in campaign ads for Mueller and donated to Mueller's campaign. Mueller won the May 2019 Democratic primary with 37% of the vote in a crowded field. In the November 2019 general election, Mueller defeated Republican nominee Sean M. Haas with 63% of the vote. Mueller took office on New Year's Day 2020.

In 2020, the website "Best Cities" ranked South Bend number 39 on its list of the 100 best small cities in the United States, giving much credit to the progress made under Buttigieg.

==== Speculations about higher office and national political involvement ====
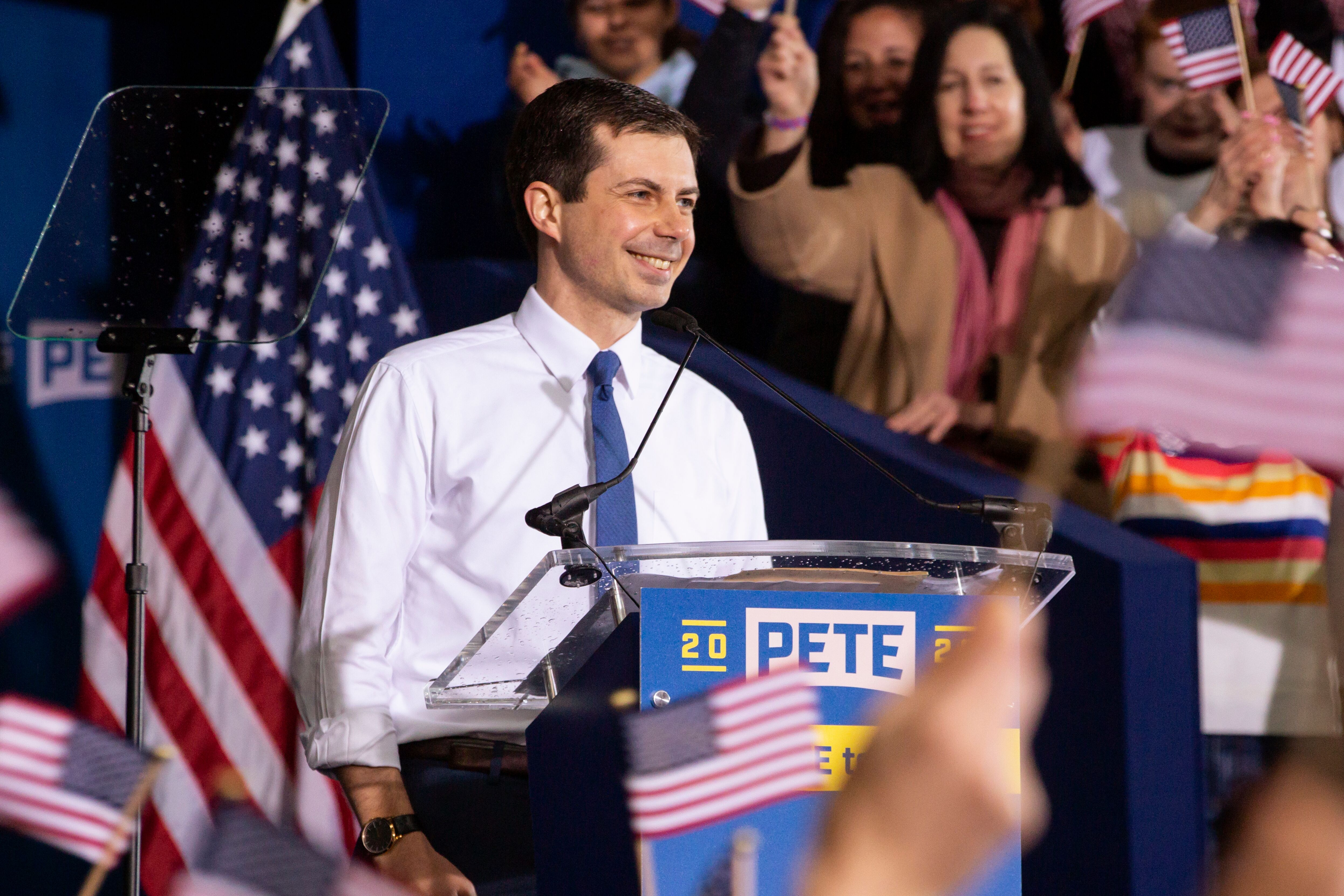
Buttigieg announcing his formal candidacy for president of the United States on April 14, 2019

During his second term, Buttieig began to involve himself in national politics. In the United States Senate election in Indiana he campaigned on behalf of Democratic Senate nominee Evan Bayh and criticized Bayh's opponent, Todd Young, for having voiced support in 2010 for retaining the military's don't ask, don't tell policy, which Bayh had voted to repeal. In the 2016 Democratic presidential primaries, Buttigieg endorsed Hillary Clinton. However, his endorsement came relatively late into the primaries. He also endorsed Democratic nominee Lynn Coleman in that year's election for Indiana's 2nd congressional district, which includes South Bend.

In 2016, columnist Frank Bruni of The New York Times published a column praising Buttigieg's work as mayor, with a headline asking speculating whether Buttigieg might one day become "the first gay president". Additionally, Barack Obama was cited as mentioning him as one of the Democratic Party's talents in a November 2016 profile on the outgoing president conducted by The New Yorker.

In January 2017, Buttigieg launched his candidacy for the 2017 Democratic National Committee chairmanship election. Buttigieg pledged to resign as mayor if elected DNC chair. He was regarded to be dark horse candidate in the race for the chairmanship, and had the endorsements of former DNC chairman Howard Dean, former Maryland governor Martin O'Malley, Indiana senator Joe Donnelly, and North Dakota senator Heidi Heitkamp. NBC News described Buttigieg as having "campaigned on the idea that the aging Democratic Party needed to empower its millennial members". He withdrew the morning before the vote was held.

With a rising national profile, Buttigieg made a national late-night talk show appearance, being interviewed on Late Night with Seth Meyers on June 22, 2017. By the end of 2017, it had been noted that as his national profile increased, Buttigieg increased his out-of-city travel. By early 2018, there was speculation that Buttigieg was looking towards running for either governor or president in 2020. There was some speculation that, despite a presidential bid being a long shot, he could garner enough recognition to become a dark horse contender for the vice presidential slot on the Democratic ticket.

For the 2018 midterms, Buttigieg founded the political action committee Hitting Home PAC. That October, Buttigieg endorsed 21 congressional candidates. He also later endorsed Mel Hall, Democratic nominee in the election for Indiana's 2nd congressional district. Buttigieg also campaigned in support of Joe Donnelly's reelection campaign in the United States Senate election in Indiana. Buttigieg campaigned for candidates in more than a dozen states, including early presidential primary states such as Iowa and South Carolina, a move indicating potential interest in running for president.

On January 23, 2019, Buttigieg announced that he was forming an exploratory committee to run for president of the United States in the upcoming 2020 election. Buttigieg sought the Democratic Party nomination for president. By the time he left office as mayor in January 2020, Buttigieg had already become a top-tier candidate for the Democratic nomination.

== Analysis of Buttigieg's leadership style ==
A number of writers for outlets such as The Wall Street Journal and HuffPost have described Buttigieg's approach to governance during his tenure as technocratic.

In 2019, Jeff Rae (who served as president of the South Bend Chamber of Commerce during Buttigieg's mayoralty, and was a former Republican mayor of the neighboring city of Mishawaka) credited Buttigieg as having brought positive new leadership to the city, remarking, "[before he took office] the city had a reputation of telling you why you couldn't do something. [After he took office] it shifted more to, 'How we can get this deal done'."

An April 2019 profile NBC News profile of Buttigieg by journalists Alex Seitz-Wald and Adam Edelman described Buttigieg as having the leadership style of a "delegator" during his tenure as mayor. Relying on interviews with individuals familiar with Buttigieg during his tenure as mayor, the profile further characterized him as having initially entered office as a "data geek", reporting that he initially came into office, "thinking like a hired-gun consultant, full of big ideas and piles of numbers and studies to transform the city." The profile credits this approach with achieving some successes, opining that by implementing "data-driven plans like those for 'smart' sewers and 'smart' streets, he began to awaken a city that had become resigned to its slow demise." However, the profile also notes that early into his mayoralty, Buttigieg suffered from "gaps in his experience, especially with people from outside his rarefied world," noting that his background as the "[Harvard and Oxford-educated] only child of two professors," had failed to prepare him for, "the gritty realities of the job of running a diverse municipality". The profile credits Buttigieg with learning and growing while mayor, writing that, "even his fiercest critics acknowledge, he listened, learned and took action, as he grew more confident personally and acknowledged the kind of shortcomings politicians often try to cover up." The profile credits a face-to-face meeting Between Buttigieg and the mother of a young local murder victim as an aha! moment for Buttigieg in how he engaged with individuals, noting that he subsequently grew into a "leader with heart", beginning to "make a human connection" with constituents and abandoning regularly wearing suits in favor of a less stuffy attire of "rolled-up sleeves". Buttigieg himself acknowledged this growth, remarking, "I came in really treating it as a management job. I've come, kind of grudgingly, to realize that the management side of the job may be the lesser half [of the job]."

In a May 2019 Time magazine profile of Buttigieg, reporter Charlotte Alter noted that in her interviews of South Bend residents nearly all residents had given generally positive opinions of Buttigieg's tenure as mayor. However, she noted that despite tis largely positive reception to his mayoralty, she heard some critiques, with some residents voicing a belief that Buttigieg bad "blind spots on issues affecting black and Hispanic residents," and some noting that while city had improved under Buttigieg benefits of improvements were not distributed equally among all residents, and the a racial wealth gap had remained a pronounced issue in the city. At the same time, Alter quoted some African American community leaders of South Bend as praising Buttigieg and his working relationship with them and their community organizations.

== See also ==
- Mayoralty of Joe Kernan —an earlier South Bend mayoralty

Political offices
Preceded by Steve Luecke	Mayor of South Bend, Indiana; 2012-2020	Succeeded by James Mueller
