= Interstate Renewable Energy Council =

American non-profit organization

Interstate Renewable Energy Council (IREC)
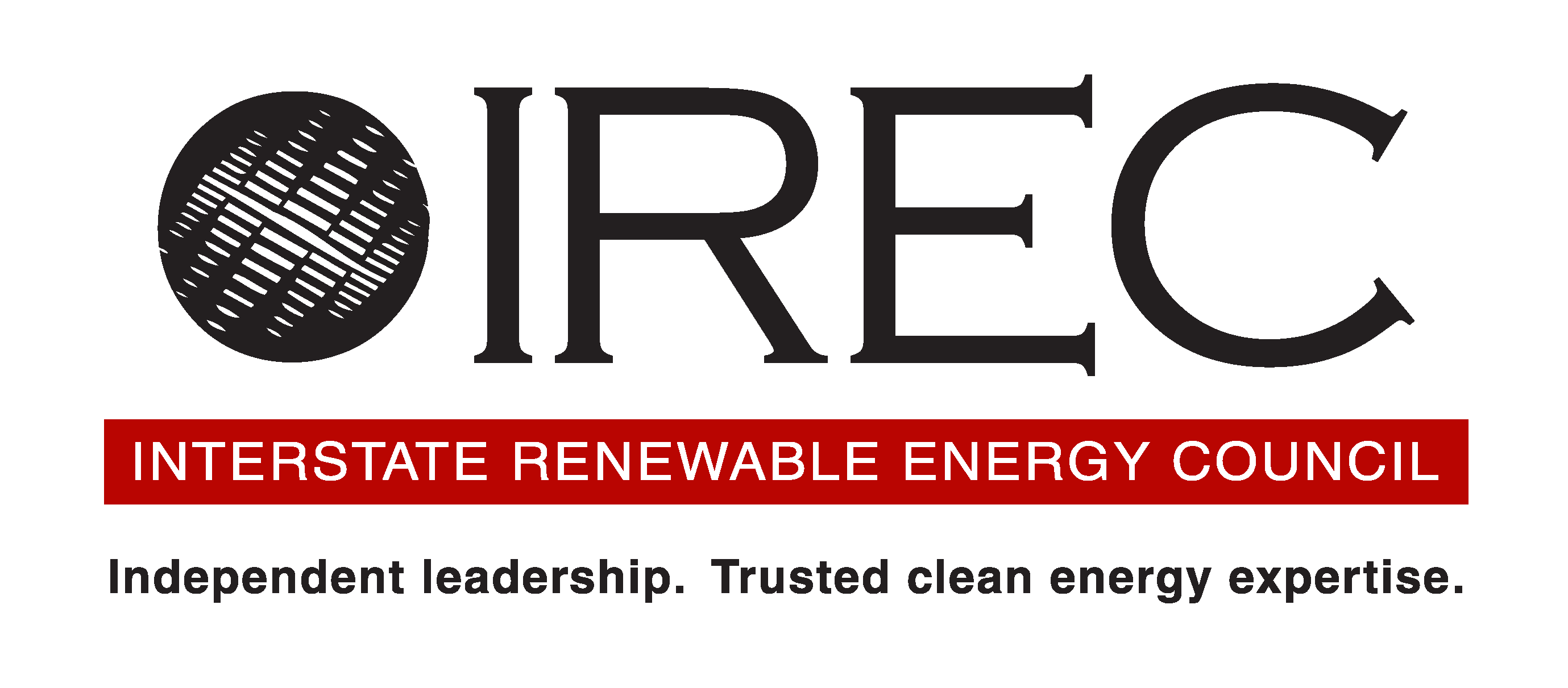
- Formation: 1982
- Type: Non-profit organization
- Headquarters: Albany, New York and Washington, D.C., United States
- President and CEO: Larry Sherwood
- Website: www.irecusa.org

The Interstate Renewable Energy Council (IREC), established in 1982, is a non-profit organization working with sustainable energy. It is based in Latham, New York.

IREC works to expand consumer access to sustainable energy, generates information and objective analysis in best practices and standards, and leads programs in building clean energy workforces. It is an accredited American National Standards developer. The organization is overseen by a board of directors, and employs a range of technical and policy experts.

== Brief history ==
IREC has worked on regulatory and workforce issues surrounding renewable energy since its incorporation in 1982. That includes work to shape the renewable energy regulatory landscape in 42 states and Puerto Rico, workforce development support that includes delivering thousands of courses on renewable energy, and the creation of a variety of clean energy career resources that have been used by tens of thousands of people to understand opportunities in clean energy jobs.

In 2021, IREC merged with the Solar Foundation, a nonprofit founded in 1977 to further solar energy in the United States. The Solar Foundation's work now continues under the IREC umbrella, including its major National Solar Jobs Census report, released each year to detail the growth and development of the American solar industry.

== Programs ==
The Interstate Renewable Energy Council has three major program areas: clean energy workforce development strategies, local clean energy solutions, and regulatory engagement. These program areas encompass a wide variety of renewable energy-related work across the United States.

=== Local Initiatives ===
The local initiatives division at IREC works to expand access to clean energy on the local government level and further support the growth of renewable energy and renewable energy-related jobs. This work includes the SolSmart program, an initiative that works to with local governments to enact solar-friendly policies; the Sustainable Energy Action Committee, a national forum for local stakeholders to address issues with code enforcement and permitting relating to renewable energy; and the Puerto Rico Solar Business Accelerator, an initiative that supports solar workforce development, expanded solar access, and the installation of solar-plus-storage microgrids in the territory.

=== Regulatory Engagement ===
IREC works to enact policies and regulatory reforms that support greater access to renewable energy. This work includes participation in regulatory proceedings to support more efficient and effective distributed energy resources interconnection processes; technical assistance and guidance that informs efforts related to solar, storage, and other clean energy technologies; and model rules and best practices.

=== Workforce Development ===
IREC works to support the development of a highly-trained and inclusive renewable energy workforce. That includes clean energy training and resources, resources like clean energy career maps and the National Solar Jobs Census, support for veterans, and the National Clean Energy Workforce Alliance, "a cross-sector effort to improve clean energy education, training, and job placement outcomes—and ensure that expanding clean energy job opportunities are inclusive of diverse candidates and underserved communities".
