= 2015 South Bend mayoral election =

- November 3, 2015
- Turnout: 14.1%
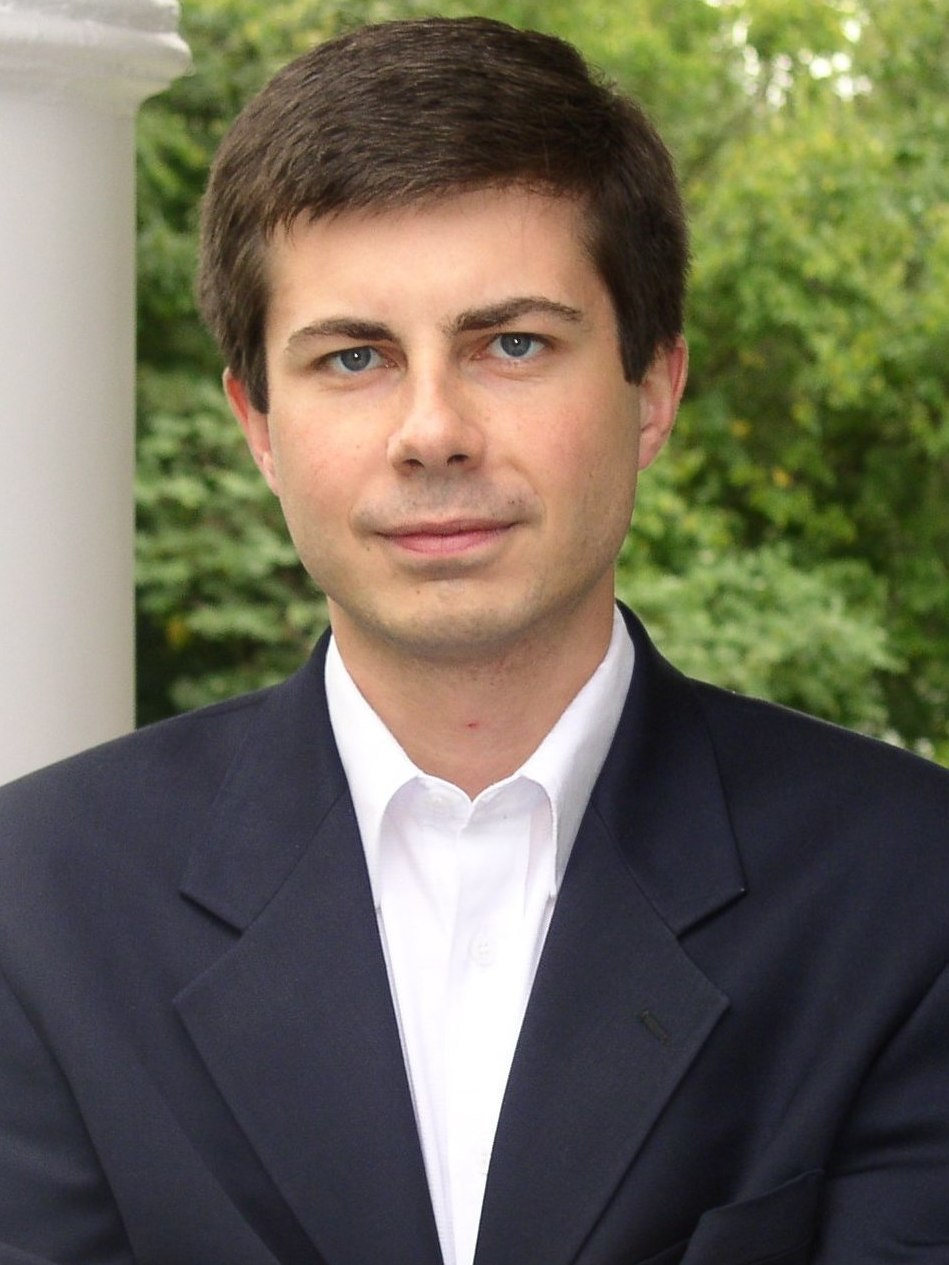

| Nominee | Pete Buttigieg | Kelly Jones |
| Party | Democratic | Republican |
| Popular vote | 8,515 | 2,074 |
| Percentage | 80.41% | 19.59% |
- Results by Common Council district
Mayor before election
Pete Buttigieg
Democratic
Elected mayor
Pete Buttigieg
Democratic

The 2015 South Bend, Indiana mayoral election was held on November 3, 2015. The election was won by the incumbent mayor, Pete Buttigieg, who was reelected with more than 80 percent of the votes, defeating Republican Kelly Jones. The election coincided with races for the Common Council and for South Bend City Clerk.

Before facing each other in the general election, Buttigieg and Jones each won their parties' nominations in primaries, with Buttigieg fending-off a challenge from Common Council member Henry Davis Jr. and Jones winning an uncontested primary.

Buttigieg handily won the general election, facing only a weak Republican competitor in a heavily Democratic city.

After being reelected to a second term as mayor, Buttigieg would later seek national office by first running in the 2017 Democratic National Committee chairmanship election, and by later running for the presidency of the United States in the 2020 Democratic Party presidential primaries. In 2021, President Joe Biden appointed Buttigieg to be the United States Secretary of Transportation.

== Nominations ==
Primaries were held May 5. During the primaries, St. Joseph County, where South Bend is located, saw voter turnout of 12% in its various primary elections. This was a decrease of 4% from the primaries four years prior. Absentee voting ballots in the South Bend primaries numbered at 2,133.

=== Democratic primary ===
Incumbent mayor Pete Buttigieg declared his intention to seek reelection on November 18, 2014. Buttigieg filed to run for reelection on January 19, 2015.

Buttigieg campaigned for renomination upon the progress made during his first term as mayor. This included declining unemployment, new development in the city's downtown, ongoing infrastructure improvements (including the city's "Smart Streets" initiative), and improvements in public safety. He also noted recent economic development announcements by the city that promised to generate $180 million in new investment and up to 1,400 new jobs. Buttigieg also noted that the prior year alone had seen the announcement of 1,349 new jobs. Buttigieg also touted the strength of the city's finances. Another of his administrations accomplishments which Buttigieg noted was the ahead-of-schedule Vacant & Abandoned Properties Initiative, which sought to either renovate or demolish 1,000 abandoned homes in as many days. He also touted his efforts to advance the city's use of technology, pointing to the reworking of the city's 3-1-1 system. Another success he claimed was the simplification of the city's tax abatement process. Buttigieg also touted himself as a champion for parks improvements, pointing to a $5.6 million parks bond approved by the Common Council in January. Buttigieg's plans for his second term included creating universal pre-kindergarten and improving public transportation. He also pledged to explore ways of cutting the cost of the federally mandated sewer project the city was to undertake, which was at the time estimated to cost $600 million. Buttigieg responded to criticisms over his transparency by saying, "I would stack our record on transparency up against anybody in this area or anywhere else."

Buttigieg's opponent was outgoing 2nd district South Bend Common Council member Henry Davis Jr., who filed his candidacy on February 6, 2015. Davis had been a member of the Common Council since 2008, having been elected in 2007, after winning an upset primary election victory over a twelve-year incumbent Common Council member. Davis claimed that he was running for mayor to "restore justice and fairness in the city of South Bend." Davis was critical of Buttigieg's policies, which he claimed were inadequate at addressing the city's problems. He criticized Buttigieg's record on crime, vacant housing, financial management, government transparency, unemployment, and economic development. He characterized Buttigieg as both a corrupt and incompetent leader. Davis opposed signature initiatives of Buttigieg. He criticized the "Smart Streets" initiative as ill-conceived and wasteful, and criticized the Vacant & Abandoned Properties Initiative as destructive. Davis denied claims that crime had declined in the city during Buttigieg's tenure, arguing instead that under Buttigieg's administration crime had actually gotten, "more persistent". He accused Buttigieg of misrepresenting crime data to minimize the optics of its severity. Despite the fact that the city had received the strong bond credit rating of AA, Davis characterized the city as being mired by unsustainable debt. Davis also argued that, among other things, Buttigieg had failed to make good on his promise of restoring the city's neighborhoods. Contrary to Buttigieg's talk of revitalization, for which Buttigieg had pointed to new developments, Davis characterized the city's downtown as "failing". Davis questioned the legitimacy of job gains touted by Buttigieg. Davis was also critical of Buttigieg's handling of a police department scandal involving wiretapping by former police chief Darryl Boykins. This scandal, and Buttigieg's handling of it, had been perceived by political analysts as having harmed Buttigieg's relations with South Bend's African American population. In addition, he accused Buttigieg of directing no-bid contracts to political allies and donors. He also alleged that the mayor was pushing privatization schemes from which his political donors would profit. Davis amplified other accusations of corruption in Buttigieg's administration. Davis charged that some residents felt that they been left behind, or even marginalized, by the changes made under Buttigieg's leadership. At two points amid the campaign, Davis used his position as a Common Council member to oppose bond issues championed by Buttigieg, both of which were passed by the Common Council despite his opposition. In January, he opposed a $5.6 million parks bond championed by Buttigieg, questioning its size and voicing concern about funds not having been earmarked for specific projects. He also opposed a $25 million bond issue to convert Main and Michigan Streets from one-way to two-way streets as part of Buttigieg's "Smart Streets" initiative, criticizing it as a misplaced priority. Davis pledged that if he were elected mayor he would implement, community policing and minority recruitment in the police force as means to decrease crime. Davis touted his own record of working to combat illegal parking and dumping in the city. While Buttigieg was touting his Vacant & Abandoned Homes Initiative, Davis was touting his own record of working to slow down the demolitions being undertaken for the initiative.

Davis' candidacy faced scandals, including headlines of his past DUI arrest. Davis also had faced controversies from the previous year, including having posted an explicit image to his Facebook page and a city resident filing a complaint against him over a message on his Twitter account about Republicans and abortion.

Davis was African American. No ethnic minority had ever been elected to a full-time executive office in St. Joseph County (which would change after the concurrent 2015 South Bend City Clerk election was won by Kareemah Fowler).

Buttigieg vastly out-fundraised Davis.

Originally also challenging Buttigieg was businessman David Frank. He was removed from the ballot by the election board due to irregularities with his residency.

In the final week of the race, Buttigieg ran advertisements in which he encouraged voters to also vote for Kareemah Fowler in the Democratic primary for South Bend City Clerk. He also sent out mailers carrying the same message. Fowler would ultimately win her primary in a landslide, carrying all but one precinct and winning 75% of the vote, defeating longtime member of the Common Council Derek Dieter. Many attributed Fowler's massive margin of victory to Buttigieg's support.

Buttigieg was favored to win the primary.

==== Endorsements ====
Pete Buttigieg

Individuals

- Kareemah Fowler, Democratic City Clerk nominee

Organizations

- Chamber of Commerce of St. Joseph County
- Indiana/Kentucky/Ohio Regional Council of Carpenters
- International Association of Fire Fighters Local 362 PAC
- International Union of Operating Engineers Local 150
- Sheet Metal Workers Local 20

==== Result ====
In the primary, Buttigieg carried 80 of the city's 85 precincts. Davis carried four precincts in his own 2nd district (which he had represented in the South Bend Common Council since 2008) and one precinct in the neighboring 6th district.

Davis, an African American himself, had performed competitively with Buttigieg, and in some cases stronger than Buttigieg, in several largely African American neighborhoods. The five precincts Buttigieg lost to Davis were all heavily African American precincts. The largest vote deficit Buttigieg had in any one of these districts was 111 (in precinct 163, which was 70% African American, and where Buttigieg received only 52 votes to Davis' 163). These districts were geographically contiguous with each other and were located in the heart of South Bend's African American community. In these five precincts, Buttigieg received a combined 172 votes, which equated to over 21% of the vote. Buttigieg, however, did well in other areas of South Bend with significant African American populations. For example, in the city's near northwest side, in precincts 102, 108 and 115, Buttigieg received a 67% of the combined vote from a population that was 49% African American and 39% white. Buttigieg argued that, while he had room to improve his relations with the city's African American population, Davis' and his respective performance in the five contiguous precincts that Davis carried may have had more to do with the fact that these precincts were geographically close to Davis' residence (and all in/bordering the district Davis represented) than it had to do with the ethnicity of voters in those precincts.

Buttigieg won in all of the city's six districts, including Davis' own 2nd district, which was heavily African American. However, he only won the 2nd district by 60 votes. The two districts where Buttigieg performed his worst and Davis, conversely, performed his best (the 2nd and 6th districts) are the city's only majority-minority districts.

Benefiting Buttigieg's performance was that many areas where he enjoyed higher levels of support had higher voter turnout than other areas of the city.

After losing to Buttigieg, Davis reversed his decision to forgo reelection to the South Bend Common Council, and would unsuccessfully run for reelection to South Bend Common Council as an independent, losing to Democratic nominee Regina Williams-Preston. Davis would subsequently return to office four years later, when he successfully ran for his former seat as a Democrat after Williams-Preston opted not to seek reelection and instead run in the 2019 mayoral election.

Democratic primary results
| Party | Candidate | Votes | % |
|---|---|---|---|
| Democratic | Pete Buttigieg (incumbent) | 8,369 | 77.68 |
| Democratic | Henry L. Davis, Jr. | 2,405 | 22.32 |
| Total votes | | 10,774 | 100 |

Results by district
| District | Buttigieg | | Davis | | Total |
| District | Votes | % | Votes | % | Total |
|---|---|---|---|---|---|
| 1 | 1,532 | 74.51% | 524 | 25.49% | 2,056 |
| 2 | 859 | 51.81% | 799 | 48.19% | 1,658 |
| 3 | 1,367 | 87.13% | 202 | 12.87% | 1,569 |
| 4 | 1,961 | 86.81% | 298 | 13.19% | 2,259 |
| 5 | 1,831 | 90.46% | 193 | 9.54% | 2,024 |
| 6 | 819 | 67.80% | 389 | 32.20% | 1,208 |

=== Republican primary ===
Kelly Jones was unopposed in the Republican primary.

Jones was a jewelry maker who had previously run unsuccessfully for a school board seat. She had first considered running for mayor as a Democrat before running as a Republican. Jones was politically little-known when she launched her candidacy, and would subsequently fail to gain much notability during her candidacy.

Republicans had unsuccessfully sought to recruit a more serious challenger to Buttigieg.

==== Result ====
The number of voters in the 2015 Republican primary was even lower than it had been in 2011, which had previously been the lowest Republican primary turnout in modern South Bend mayoral election history.

Republican primary results
| Party | Candidate | Votes | % |
|---|---|---|---|
| Republican | Kelly S. Jones | 650 | 100 |
| Total votes | | 650 | 100 |

== General election ==
Buttigieg was seen as having strong odds of winning reelection. South Bend is a strongly Democratic city. The Republican Party had seen little success in South Bend mayoral elections for the previous several decades, not having won since 1967. The Democratic nomination in South Bend's mayoral races is considered tantamount to election. Among the groups endorsing Buttigieg was the South Bend Regional Chamber and the St. Joseph County Chamber of Commerce. Buttigieg was also supported by Democratic City Clerk nominee Kareemah Fowler, whose candidacy he had supported himself. Buttigieg also won the endorsement of the South Bend Tribune. Buttigieg summed up the progress the city had made in his first term by declaring that, “In just four years, the debate over whether the city is dying is over,” while also declaring that, “our work isn’t done”. In the midst of his reelection effort, Buttigieg came out as gay in a June 2015 op-ed published in the South Bend Tribune. This came only a month after he had secured the Democratic nomination in the primary. By coming out, Buttigieg became Indiana's first openly-gay elected executive. He was the first elected official in Indiana to come out while in office. He was also the highest elected official in Indiana to come out.

By the end of September, Buttigieg's administration's Vacant & Abandoned Properties Initiative had met its goal of either renovating or demolishing 1,000 abandoned homes 62 days (two months) ahead of its 1,000 day deadline. However, this achievement was not without criticism from those who argued that the pace of this program was too fast. Buttigieg responded to criticism of his program by declaring, “I recognize that this may be the most unpopular thing I’ve done on purpose, but I believe it’s the right thing to do.” Another of Buttigieg's central projects, the "Smart Streets" initiative, also faced some criticism. Remaining consistent with what he had stated during the Democratic primary, Buttigieg's plans for his second term continued to include expanding access to pre-kindergarten and improving public transportation. Buttigieg continued to also face criticism over his handling of the police department scandal involving wiretapping by former police chief Darryl Boykins, a scandal which had polarized the population of South Bend largely along racial lines. Some constituents criticized Buttigieg's focus on improving downtown streets, arguing that he had been neglecting the upkeep of streets elsewhere in the city. Buttigieg conceded that poverty remained an issue in South Bend. While unemployment had been on the decline in South Bend, 28% of the city's populace was still living in beneath the federal poverty line. In response to continued criticism of his level of transparency, Buttigieg argued that he had led the “most transparent city of our size in the state.”

Buttigieg held an immense fundraising advantage over Jones. From the start of 2015 through October 7, Buttigieg reported having raised $337,161, while Jones reported having raised approximately a mere $585. Among those contributing to Buttigieg's campaign were South Bend Cubs owner Andrew T. Berlin and Colin Jost (the latter having been a Harvard classmate of Buttieig's). Also among those donating to his campaign was his 2011 Republican opponent, Norris W. Curry Jr. Organizations that contributed to his campaign included MWH Americas PAC and Great Lakes Capital. To some political observers, Buttigieg's large fundraising seemed to indicate that he was possibly anticipating a future run for a higher office. Viewed as a "rising star" in the Democratic Party, Buttigieg had been regularly speculated as a prospective candidate for higher state or federal offices, both elected and appointed. During the campaign, Buttigieg denied rumors that he was planning to run for the United States Senate in 2016. Asked at a debate whether he would pledge to serve a full second term, Buttigieg was noncommittal, saying, "I can’t speak to everything that will happen in the future.” However, he later walked this response back declaring, “I am planning on serving four years. I want to serve for four years.” Jones questioned the likelihood that Buttigieg would plan to serve out a full four-year term.

Jones' major platform issue was to provide more housing for South Bend's homeless. She proposed placing tiny homes on vacant lots in the city as a means of addressing homelessness. She proposed using tax increment financing funds and grant money to fund this. Jones also threw her support behind a proposal that would create a $600,000 public polling system in partnership with WNIT. This plan was the brainchild of David Frank, who had earlier been running in the Democratic primary before he was removed from the ballot. Jones offered praise for many of Buttigieg's accomplishments as mayor, and also praised his choice for the city's new police chief. She supported his approaches to combatting gang violence and his plans for improving policing through the utilization of technology such as gunfire locators. However, she offered criticism, including for his "Smart Streets" program and efforts to expand bike lanes. Among her criticism of the "Smart Streets" program was that she believed downtown streets needed an additional lane of traffic to be added if they were to be two-way in order to prevent traffic jams. Jones planned to encourage more diverse event programming downtown and stated that she would seek to revitalize the "Fat Daddy's" block at the corner of Monroe and St. Joseph streets. Jones argued that, as mayor, she would be more accessible and receptive to citizens than Buttigieg had been.

During her campaign, Jones criticized the city's handling of the sale of the former College Football Hall of Fame building to a local developer, arguing that the city received too little in exchange for the site. Buttigieg defended his Smart Street initiative and the sale of the former College Football Hall of Fame building from Jones' criticisms, once saying, "Taxpayers will benefit from a deal that brings $10 million in private investment to the empty Hall of Fame, while Smart Streets is already generating economic growth." Jones received little formal support from the Republican Party organization and lacked a strong campaign organization of her own. She also received little other outside support. Jones would have been the first woman to be elected mayor of South Bend had she won the election. As of 2019, no woman has been elected mayor of South Bend.

=== Endorsements ===
Pete Buttigieg (D)

Individuals

- Kareemah Fowler, Democratic City Clerk nominee

Newspapers

- South Bend Tribune

Organizations

- Chamber of Commerce of St. Joseph County
- Indiana/Kentucky/Ohio Regional Council of Carpenters
- International Association of Fire Fighters Local 362 PAC
- International Union of Operating Engineers Local 150
- South Bend Regional Chamber

=== Result ===
At 14.1%, voter turnout was considered to be relatively low.

Buttigieg won all of the city's 83 precincts. This included heavily Republican precincts in the 5th District, the city's Republican stronghold. However, compared to his previous election, Buttigieg underperformed in some of western South Bend's heavily African American precincts. Some of these precincts, which in 2011 had given him some of his greatest levels of support, gave him some of his weakest results in the 2015 election. Buttigieg's vote share in the city's heavily African American 2nd ward decreased by 5% compared to his 2011 performance. However, the boundaries of the city's wards (including the 2nd) had also been redrawn since 2011 election, accounting for the results of the 2010 United States census.

Of the city's six districts, Buttigieg performed best in district 4, which included areas east of the St. Joseph River, including the neighborhoods of East Bank, East Jefferson Boulevard, Edison Park, and North Shore Triangle. There, he received 86% of the vote, with 1,877 votes to Jones' 310.

General election results
| Party | Candidate | Votes | % |
|---|---|---|---|
| Democratic | Pete Buttigieg (incumbent) | 8,515 | 80.41 |
| Republican | Kelly S. Jones | 2,074 | 19.59 |
| Total votes | | 10,589 | 100 |

== Aftermath ==
In his victory speech at the West Side Democratic Club, Buttigieg described his margin-of-victory as representing a mandate.

Speculation about Buttigieg's prospective plans for higher office proved to be accurate; during his second term as mayor, Buttigieg would run unsuccessfully in the 2017 Democratic National Committee chairmanship election, and would subsequently launch a campaign for the United States presidency.

During Buttigieg's presidential campaign, amid polling which showed Buttigieg lagging in African American support, Buttigieg's loss of support in heavily African American precincts between his 2011 and 2015 general election campaigns received renewed attention.

At one point in his presidential campaign, Buttigieg declared that, "the black voters who know me best returned me to office and supported me more the second time around than the first." His campaign subsequently justified this claim by arguing that he received more black support in his 2015 primary than he had in his 2011 primary, pointing to an improved vote share in the heavily African-American 2nd ward versus his 2011 performance. PolitiFact described this claim as being, "not conclusive". PolitiFact pointed out that the 2nd ward's boundaries had been redrawn between the 2011 and 2015 elections, making for an imperfect comparison. PolitiFact also partially attributed the change in his vote share in the 2nd ward between the two primaries to the difference in the number of candidates running, as well as to a difference in the demographic and geographic base of the contenders in the two races.

During his presidential campaign, including during the September 12, 2019 debate, Buttigieg had discussed the uncertainty and personal difficulty he felt in coming out as gay in the midst of a reelection campaign in what he himself described as a "socially conservative community". In the December 19, 2019 debate, Buttigieg, defending his ability to win elections (after fellow contender Amy Klobuchar brought up his heavy loss in the 2010 Indiana State Treasurer election), characterized his 2015 general election victory as a triumph, declaring, "If you want to talk about the capacity to win, try putting together a coalition to bring you back to office with 80% of the vote as a gay dude in Mike Pence’s Indiana."

== See also ==
- Mayoralty of Pete Buttigieg
