= South Bend Police Department =

- Abbreviation: SBPD

Agency overview
- Formed: 1831
- Employees: 220 officers
- Annual budget: $31.4 million

Jurisdictional structure
- Operations jurisdiction: South Bend, Indiana, United States
- General nature: Local civilian police

Operational structure
- Headquarters: 701 W Sample St., South Bend, Indiana 46601
- Mayor responsible: James Mueller
- Agency executive: Scott Ruszkowski, Chief of Police

The South Bend Police Department (abbreviated to SBPD) is a local law enforcement agency in the City of South Bend, Indiana. The department states on its website that it "works to safeguard the lives and property of the people we serve."

== History ==
The South Bend Police Department was founded in 1831 and originally had two constables. The department officially became known as the South Bend Police Department in 1903. In 1910, the department introduced motorized patrol vehicles to officers. 1914 was the first year women were instated; this paved the way for the diversity that the department still strives for today. In the 1960s and 1970s, the department saw major growth and expansion. 1961, South Bend recruited K-9 units for the first time. 1974 saw the edition of body armor for all officers. And in 1990, the department began patrols on bicycles in an effort to bring down gasoline expenditures due to the ongoing 1990 oil price shock.

== 2015–2019 ==
In the city sought a new Chief of Police. Scott Ruszkowski was appointed and confirmed for this position in 2015 and has been on the force since 1988. In 2018, under the administration of Pete Buttigieg, body cameras became standard for all on duty-officers.

== Shooting of Eric Logan ==
2019 saw major changes to the department's use-of-force policy. On June 16, 2019, a uniformed officer was responding to reports of a man breaking into cars. When the officer arrived at the scene, he reported that the suspect was wielding a knife. The suspect (Eric Logan, a black man) was fatally shot. The officer, Ryan O'Neill, did not have his body camera on at the time. Many locals believed the use of deadly force was unnecessary, and O'Neill was terminated and prosecuted for charges including soliciting a prostitute while on-duty. While the incident was not nationally broadcast, it sparked a larger Black Lives Matter movement locally. Several non-violent protests followed the shooting, including one on the lawn of the police station on Sample Street.

== 2020–present ==
In 2020, amidst the George Floyd protests, The South Bend Common Council introduced legislation to combat police brutality. This included adopting a new officer discipline matrix and establishing better mental health support and evaluations for officers who undergo especially difficult situations while on duty. These bills were then signed into law by incumbent Mayor James Mueller.
