= James Mueller (Indiana politician) =

Mayor of South Bend, Indiana

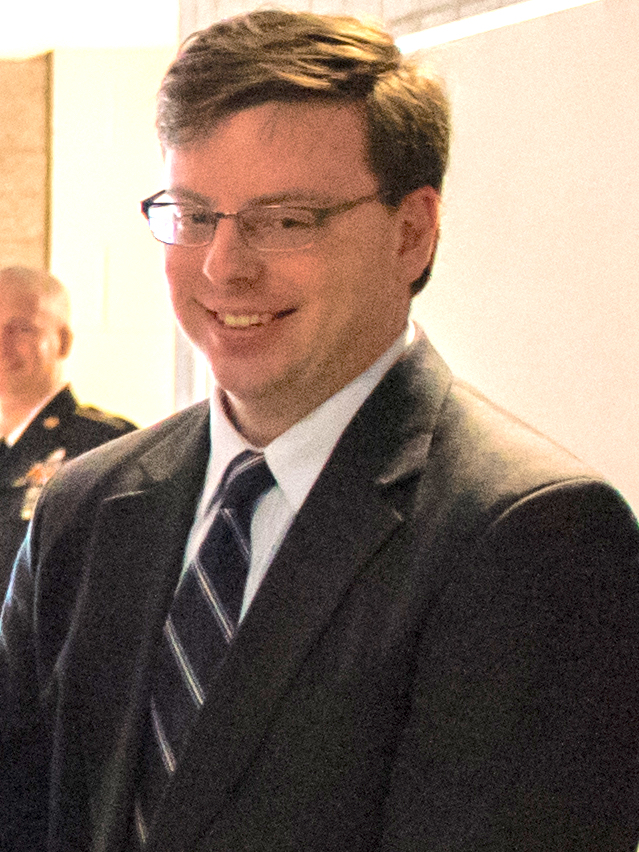
- Mueller in 2016

33rd Mayor of South Bend
- Incumbent
- Assumed office January 1, 2020
- Preceded by: Pete Buttigieg

Personal details
- Born: June 29, 1982 (age 44) South Bend, Indiana, U.S.
- Party: Democratic
- Spouse: Kellye Mitros (m. 2020)
- Education: University of Notre Dame (BA, BS); University of Delaware (PhD)
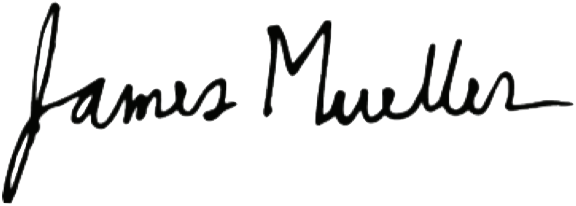
- Signature
- Website: Government website

James Mueller (born June 29, 1982) is an American politician and academic serving as the mayor of South Bend, Indiana since 2020. Prior to being elected mayor, Mueller held positions within the administration of his predecessor Pete Buttigieg.

Mueller won the Democratic nomination in a crowded primary and went on to defeat a Republican opponent in the 2019 South Bend mayoral election. In both his primary and general election campaign, Mueller proposed continuing what he regarded to be positive progress made under Buttigieg, whose endorsement he carried. He was reelected by a wider margin in 2023.

His tenure as mayor included the COVID-19 pandemic, and he collaborated with St. Joseph County to respond to the pandemic. His mayoralty has also seen him address homelessness in the city. He has also overseen efforts to reform the South Bend Police Department, including an update to the police department's use of force policy.

== Early life and education ==
Mueller was born June 29, 1982, to Thomas and Sarah Mueller. He was one of five children. His father, Thomas, was a professor of aerospace and mechanical engineering at the University of Notre Dame. His mother, Sarah, was a teacher, homemaker and social service coordinator at the YWCA.

Mueller attended elementary school at St. Anthony de Padua School. He attended St. Joseph High School, graduating in 2000. He was classmates and became friends with Pete Buttigieg while attending school there. In 2004, Mueller graduated with a bachelor's degree from the University of Notre Dame, triple majoring in mathematics, history, and philosophy. Mueller then studied ocean sciences and engineering at the University of Delaware, where he earned his PhD in oceanography.

== Early career ==
Mueller worked at George Washington University's Solar Institute in Washington, D.C., ultimately serving as its director.

Mueller also worked in the office of Senator Maria Cantwell for four years, first as a John A. Knauss Legislative Fellow, and later as a policy advisor on energy and natural resources.

=== Work in the Buttigieg administration ===
In July 2015, Mueller returned to South Bend and became the chief of staff to mayor Pete Buttigieg, who had been a childhood friend of his. This opportunity came after the resignation of Buttigieg's previous chief of staff, Kathryn Roos. Among the projects he was involved in as chief of staff was the creation of South Bend's Department of Venues, Parks and Arts as well as its Department of Innovation and Technology.

On April 24, 2017, Mueller resigned as chief of staff to become the city's director of community investment. Early into his tenure in this position, he established an Engagement & Economic Empowerment Division in the Department of Community Investment. As director of community investment, Mueller was responsible for an agreement which was to bring a chocolate factory and dinosaur museum tourist attraction to South Bend, to be developed by South Bend Chocolate owner Mark Tarner. In 2017, he was also made South Bend's member of the Transit District Steering Committee, a committee created by NICTD, composed of representatives from the municipalities that currently had, or were slated to in the future have, South Shore Line train stations. Mueller left his position in city government in mid-2019, amid his mayoral campaign, to avoid ethics conflicts.

== 2019 mayoral campaign ==
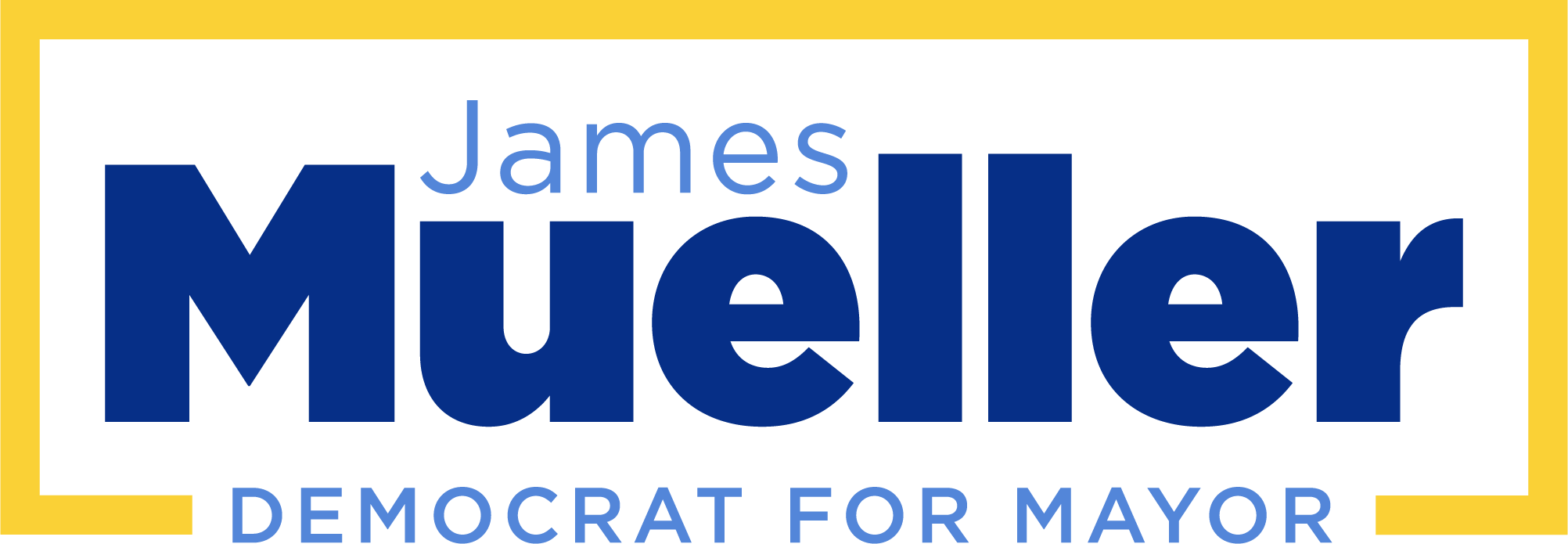
Mueller's 2019 campaign logo

On December 17, 2018, Buttigieg announced that he would not be seeking reelection to a third term. On January 22, 2019, Mueller announced his candidacy for mayor. This was Mueller's first bid for elected office. At the time he launched his campaign, Mueller lacked name recognition. Mueller's campaign manager in the primary was Malcolm Phelan.

Mueller's campaign closely tied him with Buttigieg, and promised to build upon what he regarded to be positive progress made during Buttigieg's tenure. He pledged to continue many of the policies and programs implemented by Buttigieg. Buttigieg endorsed Mueller in February. Mueller's campaign platform included a plan to implement universal preschool, a plan to make investments in infrastructure (including addressing the city's pothole problem), plans to focus on sustainability (including adopting "clean" energy), plans aiming to improve public safety, and plans relating to fostering economic growth (including plans aimed at making South Bend, "a national model for inclusive growth" by "expanding access to opportunities"). His slogan was, "Keep South Bend Moving Forward." On May 7, Mueller won a crowded primary to capture the Democratic nomination.

Kacey Gergely was Mueller's campaign manager for the general election. Mueller continued to campaign upon promising to continue the progress made during Buttigieg's tenure. One of the themes of a general ad campaign by Mueller was "Working with Pete". In the general election, Mueller outlined 32 actionable items to address crime in the city, categorized into four groups. The four categories of Mueller's plans were reducing violence; recruiting and retaining a diverse police force; building more relationships through community policing and improving resident participation; and officer training and policies. Key components of Mueller's plan included expanding the Group Violence Intervention program, establishing a summer youth jobs program, creating a community advisory board, and collaborating with Mishawaka and St. Joseph County leaders to incorporate the existing metro homicide unit into a “major crimes unit". Mueller's campaign placed an emphasis on racial justice reform, arguing that there needed to be community wide changes as well as changes within the police department to achieve this.

In the November 5 general election, Mueller defeated Republican nominee Sean M. Haas. South Bend typically votes for Democratic candidates, and Mueller won more than 63% of the vote.

== Mayoral transition ==
After being elected mayor, Mueller worked to fill positions on his staff.

Mueller expressed a view as mayor-elect that, while South Bend had made tremendous progress under Buttigieg, it was not yet entirely "back" (i.e., revived), stating, “After decades of decline, we finally turned the corner, but we are not where we want to be as a community. There are a lot of people that haven't experienced the growth yet.” This was in contrast with Buttigieg's farewell speech as mayor before the Common Council (South Bend's city council), in which Buttigieg had declared that, "South Bend is back".

As mayor-elect, Mueller expressed that public safety would be his top priority upon becoming mayor. He declared that, in order to help the entirety of the South Bend community to experience growth, the city would need to address issues in its public safety system. He wanted to see the pending results of a study being conducted by the national police consulting group 21st Century Policing (21CP) on the matter. He intended to discuss the results of the study, once it completed, with police leadership, as well as discussing the department policy regarding body cameras. Mueller also expressed his desire to create a working group consisting of people that have an interest in the relationship between South Bend's community and its police force. He hoped that this working group could include community members and members of the Fraternal Order of Police (FOP), the city's police union.

As mayor-elect, Mueller supported Dawn Jones to remain as South Bend city clerk, the only directly elected citywide office. Jones had been temporarily serving as city clerk since winning a Democratic party caucus vote in August to replace Kareemah Fowler, after Fowler had resigned as city clerk in 2019 to become chief financial officer at South Bend Community School Corporation. Fowler resigned too late to remove her name from the ballot for reelection in the 2019 general election, therefore creating a scenario in which Fowler was elected to another four-year term as city clerk and a Democratic precinct caucus needed to be held to again appoint someone in her place. Jones, touting Mueller's endorsement, along with the endorsement of South Bend Common Council president Tim Scott, defeated her challenger in the caucus.

== Mayoralty ==
Mueller assumed office on January 1, 2020, at noon. His ceremonial inauguration was held later that day at Century Center. He is the 33rd mayor of South Bend. Mueller took office at a time when South Bend had increased national and international attention from Buttigieg's presidential candidacy.

=== Appointments and staffing ===
On January 6, 2020, Mueller announced several appointments, including Kacey Gergely (his 2019 campaign manager) as his Chief of Staff, Jordan Gathers as Deputy Chief of Staff, and Shalon “Shay” Davis as Director of Community Outreach. Mueller retained a vast majority of Buttigieg's appointed department heads, including Aaron Perri as Executive Director of Venues, Parks and Arts, Chuck Bulot as Building Commissioner, Daniel Parker as City Controller, Denise Riedl as Chief Innovation Officer, Eric Horvath as Director of Public Works, Kyra Clark as Director of Human Resources, Scott Ruszkowski as Chief of Police, and Stephanie Steele as Corporation Counsel. Mueller appointed Michael Patton the city's diversity compliance/inclusion officer. On February 14, 2020, Mueller appointed Maurice "Moe" Scott as directory of community initiatives, a new position that Buttigieg had created months earlier for the 2020 budget year.

On April 1, 2020, Mueller named Carl Buchanon as fire chief. In October 2020, Mueller named former South Bend innovation officer Santiago Garces to head the Department of Community Investment. In December 2020, after the city's Board of Public Safety president John Collins resigned after almost a decade on the board, Mueller appointed Darryl Heller, a local civil rights activist and the director of the Indiana University South Bend Civil Rights Heritage Center, to fill his seat the board. In May 2021, Mueller appointed Chuck Leon as the city's interim corporation counsel.

=== Budgets ===
On October 13, 2020, Mueller signed the city's 2021 budget. The budget had been approved unanimously by the Common Council the day before. The $354.7 million budget saw a $4 million decrease in general operation spending compared to the previous year's budget, as part of a three-year plan to balance city budgets to compensate for revenue losses experienced in 2020 due to the COVID-19 pandemic.

=== Housing ===
Mueller has expressed concern for the maintenance of some buildings operated by the Housing Authority of South Bend.

==== Homelessness ====
By the end of 2020, St. Joseph County, in which South Bend is located, had seen a 25% increase in homelessness per the Indiana Housing & Community Development Authority (IHCDA). This was the third greatest increase homelessness of any of the regions categorized by the IHCDA (the IHCDA breaks the state into 17 "regions", of which St. Joseph County is one of only four single-county regions).

In May 2020, a tent city formed on a vacant lot located between two vacant structures the 500 block of Michigan Street. Mueller initially did not act to dismantle the encampment, declaring in mid-May,

"It's my understanding it has remained clean and sanitary, and as safe as other places that could be outside without permanent shelter. Being pragmatic, as long as this remains safe and sanitary and healthy, and doesn't generate its own safety or health concerns, then, while not ideal, this may be the best option we have in the near term."

However, the tent city continued to grow. Safety concerns over the growing encampment, and the demand from the property owner for the camp to vacate, led to the city breaking up the encampment, without incident, a week after Mueller's earlier remarks. Mueller remarked, "We're not looking to enforce where there's not issues. The thing that we found is that these large encampments invite a lot of problems". Mueller declared that he would be less likely to break up encampments that are smaller in size and that are not causing issues. Mueller remarked, "We can't encourage large encampments". After being broken up, the encampment merely shifted to vacant lot across the street after having been broken up. Mueller remarked, "This is not an ideal solution and that's why we're looking at trying to get better solutions over the long term." Mueller explored options for where to locate a possible new homeless shelter where the homeless in question could move. He also stated that he would ultimately order the new camp to disperse with a 48-hour notice provided, but did not immediately decide when he would give such an order. The new tent city location was ultimately shut down roughly a week later. A new encampment would soon rise outside the Dulos Chapel on South St. Joseph Street.

Soon after the first encampment arose, Mueller expressed interest in opening what would be the first homeless shelter owned by the city itself, and the third shelter located in the city. Mueller's idea was to create a shelter that would serve the chronically homeless, including those with addictions and mental illness who are unable to stay at drug-and-alcohol prohibiting shelters. Mueller even floated a potential location for such a shelter, but faced opposition from local business leaders. Ultimately, the idea was dropped after the Common Council was unsupportive of it.

On July 16, 2020, Mueller vetoed a resolution passed by a 5–4 vote of the Common Council three days prior urging him to take several actions on homelessness, including declaring a "state of emergency". This was the second time in his mayoralty in which he had issued a veto. However, afterwards, he sent out a letter declaring his full support for, "acting as swiftly as possible and working together as a community toward sustainable solutions for our homeless neighbors". On July 26, Common Council would attempt, but fail, to override his veto.

In October 2020, St. Joseph County worked with the city to use CARES Act funding, as well as funding by the county and city, to temporarily house homeless in motels, in what has dubbed the "Motels4Now" program, which was planned to last for at least several months. By December, the program was providing housing to more than a hundred homeless individuals. As of June 2021, the program had funding to last through the fall of 2021. Before the allocation of government funding in October, a more modest sized version of the program was being run, having been funded by an anonymous donation.

In late-October 2020, the Mueller administration announced that it was finalizing its plans to address the city's homelessness.

Mueller pledged to, in 2021, spend $650,000 in municipal funds generated by the city's "Economic Development Income Tax" on addressing homelessness. Mueller also assigned his deputy chief of staff Jordan Gathers to be his "point person" on issues relating to homelessness.

In August 2020, after dropping his idea to create a municipal shelter for the chronically homeless, Mueller appointed a 31-person group to give recommendations on addressing homelessness. In February 2021, the group released a report on its final recommendations. Among the recommendations that the group gave was that the city and county create and collaboratively fund a position of "homeless coordinator", who would be tasked with helping to connect the homeless with services and people working to address homelessness. The month the report was released, Mueller announced that he would earmark $25,000 raised from the "Economic Development Income Tax" towards funding the creation of a permanent coordinator, and would consider asking the county and even the neighboring city of Mishawaka to assist in paying. Mueller also announced that he would be budgeting $75,000 raised from the "Economic Development Income Tax" to hire a contractor, as opposed to a salaried municipal employee, in the interim to begin putting in place some of the recommendations the group had given.

Under Mueller, the city partnered with a local laundromat and the St. Joseph County Health Department to provide free laundry service for families in need and the homeless.

In late May 2021, the city of South Bend began to interview candidates for the new position of "facilitator of homelessness efforts", a one-year contract job that will be given a $75,000 budget. Mueller declared that he would be willing to give $25,000 to the county to aid in their plans to create a similar position to serve all of St. Joseph County.

In June 2021, Mueller announced that he was having discussions about partnering with St. Joseph County in order to create a permanent way to address homelessness in the city. Goals outlined by South Bend and county officials included establishing a homeless intake center. A homeless intake center had been an important part of Mueller's 2019 mayoral campaign platform's plan to address homelessness in the city.

Under Mueller, South Bend is seeking state tax credits to construct permanent supportive housing developments as part of the Indiana Housing & Community Development Authority's Permanent Supportive Housing Institute. It is partnering with the South Bend Heritage Foundation, Oaklawn, Beacon Health and 1st Source in competing against other communities to secure these tax credits.

=== Infrastructure ===
In early February 2021, Mueller unveiled a proposed three-year $25 million street repavement plan dubbed "Rebuilding Our Streets". He declared that, rather than only focusing on the most-used streets, as the city had in the past, the project would focus on repaving lesser-used streets that are in the worst-rated condition. In announcing this project, Mueller declared that he would, the following month, be requesting from the Common Council approval of an approximately $9 million bond issue, to be repaid by existing income taxes over the next several years, in order to "jump start" the project. The plan received immediate support from several Common Council members, including Common Council President Karen White. At the same time this plan was announced, his administration's innovation chief, Linn Riedl, also unveiled a newly launched online dashboard which South Bend residents could use to both check see condition rating of streets, and keep track of progress made towards improving them in both the new three-year "Rebuilding Our Streets" project, as well as the city's broader ten-year aims for street repairs. In late March, the South Bend Common Council approved two bills that will enable $9.7 of "Neighborhood Infrastructure Bonds" to be issued. $8.6 million of the funds raised by these bonds will go towards road reconstruction, while the rest will go towards other expenses, such as the cost of issuance. The funds raised by the bonds will be managed through the South Bend Building Corporation. The city's Economic Development Income Tax will be used to repay the bonds.

Mueller has stated that both of the two remaining proposals for a potential relocation of South Bend's South Shore Line station had reached high enough cost projections that he felt they would require state or federal assistance to be realized. One of the proposals would see the station, currently located on the east side of South Bend International Airport, instead located to the west side of the airport, where an intermodal freight hub would also be constructed in tandem. The other, which had been championed by Buttigieg as mayor, would see a new station built in downtown South Bend. Mueller has stated that, unless he sees a persuasive case that an intermodal freight hub at the airport would have strong economic benefits, he would remain tepid on the idea of contributing municipal funding to a new station there.

In May 2021, a group proposed the idea of building a streetcar system that would run from Notre Dame University into South Bend's downtown before traveling along Mishawaka Avenue into Mishawaka's downtown. The group proposed that local governments commit $250,000 to conduct a feasibility study for such a streetcar line. In response to this, Mueller declared that he would need to look at a formal request from the group before he would comment on whether he would entertain the possibility of dedicating city funds to a study of this concept. He did state that many of the locales that would be serviced by stops along the streetcar route that the group proposed are locations which the city has been eying for improvements.

=== Public health and safety ===
==== COVID-19 pandemic ====
Months into his tenure, the global COVID-19 pandemic began to impact the United States.

On March 16, 2020, Mueller ordered the closing of city parks buildings, the suspension of the ability for residents to pay their water bills in-person, and the suspension of water service shutoffs for nonpayments (the latter step taken in an effort to receive the burden on individuals losing income due to the pandemic). On March 17, Mueller joined St. Joseph county commissioners in announcing non-essential travel advisory. On March 19, Mueller declared an emergency, which automatically issued a level 2 travel advisory (out of 3 levels) against all nonessential travel.

In early April, South Bend Regional Chamber of Commerce President and CEO Jeff Rea signed a memorandum of understanding with Mueller and all three St. Joseph County commissioners under which he would help lead the South Bend and St. Joseph County response to the coronavirus pandemic. In mid-April, Mueller announced that the city had leased a Motel 6 location in order to allow the homeless to have a location where they could self-quarantine. In mid-April, Mueller also announced that the city had pledged $600,000 for CDFI groups loaning capital to small businesses not covered by federal grants.

On May 1, Mueller and St. Joseph County's deputy health officer, Dr. Mark Fox, both criticized governor Eric Holcomb's decision to move the state towards stage two in its reopening plan.

During their COVID-19 response, Mueller and St. Joseph County's leadership have often voiced disagreement over policy regarding the virus with Dave Wood, the mayor of South Bend's neighboring city of Mishawaka.

Mueller advised compliance with Centers for Disease Control and Prevention recommended practices such as wearing protective masks, social distancing, and limiting gathering sizes.

In October 2020, with St. Joseph County seeing a spike in cases and hospitalizations, Mueller remarked, 'It's no secret that I thought we were reopening a little too fast in May, so we never got the numbers down to a safe level. Then there was the spike from campus reopening and that was mostly contained to what was happening at the University of Notre Dame then we went through Labor Day did a good job and number were actually coming back down through mid-September and now we've seen a big spike in the past couple weeks, the highest level in the community we've seen all year."

South Bend received a $48,750 allocation from the CARES Act to distribute to small businesses and nonprofits within the city that have been impacted. The city distributed grants up to $1,000 to small businesses and nonprofits. In November 2020, Mueller participated in reviewing applications received for these grants.

In late January 2021, South Bend launched an "innovation grant" program to compensate restaurants for operational changes they have undergone during the pandemic. The city formed a partnership with the South Bend Regional Chamber of Commerce, which would help oversee this program. The $500,000 program distributes grants of up to $2,000.

In late March 2021, Mueller said that, in private talks, he had agreed with some other local leaders, such as Dave Wood and St. Joseph County commissioner Andy Kostielney, that St. Joseph County should change from having a mandate requiring the wearing of protective mask to an advisory urging it. He stated that he had agreed with this because, due to the lax enforcement the county of the mandate by the county, he believed there was little practical difference between the impacts of the mandate and that of an advisory. He also stated that he had agreed in hopes of having a united front with other local leaders. After St. Joseph County's health officer Robert Einterz's made the decision to instead extend the county's mandate, Mueller called criticism from county commissioners of the decision "unfortunate" due to his belief that there was little distinction between the impacts of the mandate and that of an advisory. He stated that he believed that such criticism could have the impact of dividing the community. Mueller released a statement after the decision to extend the mandate, saying, "I support our health officials on this difficult decision and encourage our residents to continue following CDC guidelines."

In mid-March 2021, anticipating that the coming warmer seasonal weather and the ongoing pandemic could lead to a rise in outdoor dining at restaurants, Mueller proposed an ordinance to the Common Council that would allow restaurants to leave as little as 4 feet of remaining sidewalk space to use by people with wheelchairs and scooters. City officials have argued that the Americans with Disabilities Act of 1990 allows this by permitting access reductions from the standard 5 feet. In late-March, Mueller declared, "with vaccines rolling out quickly and the weather warming up, now is a great time to gather outdoors," and stated that the community would be able to enjoy outdoor events, "as we keep up our guard against the spread of COVID-19."

Mueller has promoted getting vaccinated against COVID-19. For instance, in mid-May 2021, Mueller said, "the great news from our public health officials confirms that the vaccine provides strong protection and the quick vaccine rollout has finally turned the tide in our year-long fight against COVID-19. Fully vaccinated residents can now resume their normal lives safely. The sooner everyone gets vaccinated, the sooner we can put this behind us once and for all. The vaccine is easy, safe, effective, and free."

==== Policing ====
On October 22, 2020, Mueller and other city leaders brokered tentative agreement in negotiations with the city's chapter of the Fraternal Order of Police that would see the city give a majority of its police officers a 9% pay raise as part of its new contract with the union. Ahead of this agreement, the FOP had been vocal about low morale among the city's police force, particularly after the city's Common Council tabled discussion of a proposed pay raise in June 2020. Mueller voiced his belief that, in order to have a successfully managed police force, the city needed to offer its officers "competitive salaries". The following day, other aspects of the new negotiated contract with the police union were approved by the city's Board of Public Safety. The pay raise was approved by the Common Council on October 26.

Mueller's mayoral administration has undertaken work to reform the city's police department. Mueller has declared it a priority of his administration. Mueller has said that he considers South Bend to, in many ways, be a leader in policing, but has also argued that it there are many areas where its policing has room for improvement.

An audit of the city's police department conducted by the Chicago firm 21st Century Policing (21CP) was released in July 2020. The study had been ordered by then-mayor Buttigieg in November 2019. Mueller's spokesperson has said that he hopes to implement as many of the 56 recommendations that the audit gave the city, but gave no exact number of how many recommendations will see action taken upon.

Mueller backed revisions to the city's discipline guidelines, which had been created after months of debate and changes. The final form of these changes received the backing of the city's Fraternal Order of Police. These changes included a matrix, which is a chart which categorizes potential officer violations and lists a range of penalties for first, second, and third offenses. Creating a matrix had been one of the recommendations of the audit of the city's police department conducted by the firm 21st Century Policing. On July 15, 2020, these new guidelines were approved by the city's Board of Public Safety.

Mueller worked with the police department to update its use of force policy. An earlier proposal for such an update was withdrawn by Mueller in September 2020 after receiving criticism from activists that it was too lenient on officers. Since June 2020, Mueller has been publicly advocating, along with other city leaders, to ban the use of chokeholds by police, joining a national trend of municipalities banning the use of chokeholds by their police forces. A revised draft of the use of force policy was released in early December 2020. In mid-December 2020, Mueller stated that the use of force policy could be presented to the Board of Public Safety as early as January or February 2021. On February 17, the Board of Public Safety approved the revised use of force policy, with board members calling it a positive step forwards, while also urging Mueller to submit further changes in future months. On June 16, 2021, the Board of Public Safety approved further changes that Mueller had worked on.

In June 2021, Mueller participated in an event facilitating community dialogue about reevaluating the role of law enforcement officers in schools.

The city, after having for years explored the idea of creating a citizens review board. As mayor, Mueller became involved in the push to create a new review office to handle police misconduct complaints. Such an office was established through an ordinance that was passed in October 2020. In July 2021, Mueller pushed the newly hired head of the department, Joshua Reynolds, to resign after it was reported. Mueller's calls for Reynolds' resignation came after it became known, after a South Bend Tribune investigation, that Reynolds had been suspended seven times for misbehavior while working on the Indianapolis Metropolitan Police Department. Reynolds initially refused to resign. Reynolds had been appointed by South Bend City Clerk Dawn Jones in May of that year. A dispute arose between Mueller and City Clerk Dawn Jones over whether to keep Reynolds on the city payroll through the end of the 2021. The City Council transferred power over the department from the City Clerk's office to the mayor's office. Reynolds resigned on August 20, while the bill transferring power of the department was under consideration.

=== Other municipal matters ===
Mueller has collaborated with the South Bend school board. Per Indiana state law, the school district in South Bend is run by a separate entity, entirely independent from the municipal government. In 2020, Mueller supported a $220 million referendum to raise the city's taxes in order to provide more funding to local schools. The measure passed with approximately 60% of voters approving the proposition.

On May 6, 2021, at the unveiling of the St. Joseph Solar Farm, Mueller unveiled a proclamation that May 6 will be "Solar Energy Day" in South Bend.

Mueller has considered either replacing the city's code enforcement department with a new "Department of Neighborhoods" or merging it into the Department of Community investment.

=== Political endorsements ===
On February 12, 2020, in an interview with the South Bend Tribune, Mueller was asked about whether he would endorse the presidential campaign of his predecessor Pete Buttigieg. Mueller initially answered that he was unsure. However, three hours after the interview was published, Mueller backpedalled his answer, saying that he "enthusiastically" supported Buttigieg's candidacy.

On March 30, 2020, Mueller, after months of avoiding taking a position, voiced his support for a referendum that, if approved, would see an increase in property taxes to fund $220 million for South Bend's schools over the next eight years. The referendum was up for a vote during the primary elections held on June 2, 2020. Roughly 60% of voters approved the referendum.

In October 2020, ahead of the 2020 elections, Mueller took the unusual step as mayor of endorsing candidates in the city's school board elections.

In the 2021 race for St. Joseph County Democratic Party chairman, Mueller endorsed Dave Nufer who ran against incumbent chair Stan Wruble, former chair Owen "Butch" Morgan, and Oliver Davis Jr. Nufer lost, with Wruble winning reelection.

== Political positions ==
Mueller has been critical of Donald Trump, declaring in his 2019 victory speech that, "Trumpism has no place in South Bend". In January 2021, as Trump was about to leave office, Mueller commented, "It's no secret that the outgoing administration did not view cities, for the most part, favorably," and expressed hope that the incoming administration of Joe Biden would treat cities better than the Trump administration had.

Mueller believes that systemic racism is a problem that needs to be dealt with. He believes that it is present in South Bend, and that it is important to admit that. He does not believe that the admittance of the presence of systemic racism is about vilifying anyone, but rather, is about recognizing institutions and how they have historically and currently been discriminatory towards certain groups of people.

In early June 2020, amid the nationwide George Floyd protests, Mueller expressed his recognition of the sentiments behind peaceful protests in South Bend and the greater Michiana region, saying, "This is the culmination of things that have happened over a long period of time. And, you know, the anger and pain and frustration that we haven't addressed these things fully and it's 2020 is certainly real." In a late-May statement responding to the George Floyd Protests, Mueller declared, "I hear the anger and empathize with those who face systemic injustice." He declared that he was committed to getting more answers to the 2019 South Bend police shooting of Eric Logan. He also declared, "Reforming our public safety systems remains a top priority of my administration. To be successful, this will have to be an inclusive process. Change won't happen overnight, but I'm confident we can overcome whatever challenges we face together.”

== Electoral history ==
2019 South Bend mayoral election (Democratic primary)
| Party | Candidate | Votes | % |
|---|---|---|---|
| Democratic | James Mueller | 4,447 | 37.37% |
| Democratic | Jason Critchlow | 3,081 | 25.89% |
| Democratic | Lynn Coleman | 2,701 | 22.70% |
| Democratic | Regina Williams-Preston | 876 | 7.36% |
| Democratic | Oliver Davis | 723 | 6.08% |
| Democratic | Salvador Rodriguez | 23 | 0.19% |
| Democratic | Will Smith | 18 | 0.15% |
| Democratic | Shane Inez | 16 | 0.13% |
| Democratic | Richard Wright | 15 | 0.13% |

2019 South Bend mayoral election (General election)
| Party | Candidate | Votes | % |
|---|---|---|---|
| Democratic | James Mueller | 9,437 | 63.41 |
| Republican | Sean M. Haas | 5,445 | 36.58 |

2023 South Bend mayoral election (Democratic primary)
| Party | Candidate | Votes | % |
|---|---|---|---|
| Democratic | James Mueller (incumbent) | 4,880 | 67.50 |
| Democratic | Henry Davis Jr. | 2,350 | 32.50 |
| Total votes | | 7,230 | 100 |

2023 South Bend mayoral election (General election)
| Party | Candidate | Votes | % |
|---|---|---|---|
| Democratic | James Mueller (incumbent) | 7,877 | 72.83 |
| Republican | Desmont Upchurch | 2,938 | 27.17 |
| Total votes | | 10,815 | 100 |

== Personal life ==
By the time of his mayoral run, Mueller was dating Kellye Mitros. In September 2020, Mueller married Mitros before a small number of friends and family in a small wedding ceremony officiated by Pete Buttigieg, which was held outdoors, socially distanced, with protective masks worn due to the ongoing COVID-19 pandemic. This made Mueller the second South Bend mayor to get married while in office, after Buttigieg himself.

== See also ==
- List of mayors of South Bend, Indiana

Party political offices
| Preceded by Pete Buttigieg | Democratic nominee for Mayor of South Bend; 2019 | Most recent |
Political offices
| Preceded by Pete Buttigieg | Mayor of South Bend; January 1, 2020 – present | Incumbent |
