= SolSmart =

U.S. Department of Energy program

- Formation: 2016
- Purpose: SolSmart is a national program designed to recognize cities, counties, towns, and regional organizations that are encouraging solar energy growth at the local level.
- Parent organization: Interstate Renewable Energy Council, International City/County Management Association
- Website: https://solsmart.org/

The SolSmart program, established in 2016, is a national program funded by the U.S. Department of Energy Solar Energy Technologies Office with a mission to reduce solar soft costs and help local governments across the United States expand the use of solar energy in their jurisdictions. It is managed jointly by the Interstate Renewable Energy Council and the International City/County Management Association.

SolSmart works with representatives from local governments to adopt nationally recognized best practices to encourage solar energy use. This guidance covers areas such as zoning, market development, permitting and inspection, and more. SolSmart includes technical assistance providers that work with local government staff at no cost and guide them through the process. Upon meeting the required criteria, a community is awarded Bronze, Silver, Gold, or Platinum designation status.

500 towns, cities, counties, and regional organizations have been designated by the SolSmart program to date. These communities are located in 43 states, Puerto Rico, the U.S. Virgin Islands, and the District of Columbia. In 2022, the Department of Energy announced that the SolSmart program was approved for a five-year extension, with a goal of 500 additional community designees.

== Structure of the SolSmart Program ==
=== Technical Assistance ===
A key component of the SolSmart program is no-cost technical assistance, which features expert guidance on adoption of best practices and codes related to solar at the local level. SolSmart's technical assistance team includes partner organizations with expertise on solar energy and local government. Every municipality, county, and regional organization is eligible to receive this technical assistance at no cost. SolSmart also has an online resource library, including toolkits, training presentations, webinars, and other reports to help meet a community's needs.

=== Designation ===
Once a community meets certain criteria, the local government receives a designation of SolSmart Platinum, Gold, Silver, or Bronze. A SolSmart designation provides recognition that the local government has made a commitment to solar energy and has taken action to implement a transparent and streamlined permitting and inspection process that does not create barriers to solar projects. For companies looking to move into the area, it's a sign that the community is “open for solar business.” The SolSmart program also helps raise the visibility of designated communities, providing marketing templates and general promotion materials and featuring designated communities in SolSmart materials and best practice guides and resources. Communities can join the program through a form on the SolSmart website.

=== Partner Organizations ===
The SolSmart program is managed by the Interstate Renewable Energy Council and the International City/County Management Association, but it also includes a dozen partner organizations that work to extend the reach and efficacy of the program. These partner organizations are all experts in solar energy and local government. Supporting partners include:

- Brooks Engineering
- Cadmus Group
- Great Plains Institute
- Institute for Building Technology and Safety
- National Association of Counties Research Foundation
- National Association of Development Organizations Research Foundation
- National Association of Regional Councils
- National Association of State Energy Officials
- National League of Cities
- National Renewable Energy Laboratory
- Solar Energy Industries Association
- World Resources Institute

== Efficacy of the SolSmart Program ==
A study published in the Proceedings of the National Academy of Sciences found that SolSmart has “achieved its intended outcome to promote solar adoption in local communities.” The findings included that SolSmart can lead to increased solar capacity within communities as well as increase local knowledge of solar energy.

== History ==
The SolSmart program launched in 2016. Since the program's inception, it has been managed by the Interstate Renewable Energy Council and the International City/County Management Association. The first group of community designees were announced in September 2016, and included major cities such as Denver, Austin, and Philadelphia, as well as smaller towns such as Redwood City, California and Gladstone, Missouri.

Between 2016 and 2023, the SolSmart program designated 500 communities across the U.S., with the 500th community being Ashland, Massachusetts. An additional 500 community designees are planned by 2027. Under the Biden administration, SolSmart is a Justice40 program, with an emphasis on ensuring that at least 40% of new designees are underserved communities.

With the 2023 expansion of the program, SolSmart also announced a new Platinum designation for communities enacting cutting-edge initiatives to advance solar energy at the local level. Previously, only Bronze, Silver, and Gold designations were available. The Program aims to designate another 500 communities by 2027.
