= Ignition Park =

Indiana technology park under development

Coordinates: 41°39′41″N 86°15′28″W

Ignition Park is a technology park under development in South Bend, Indiana, United States on roughly 140 acres (57 ha) of land south of the city's downtown that were formerly the site of the Studebaker manufacturing complex. Though originally the park was only around 80 acres (32 ha), after much talk of doing so by city officials, it was expanded to 140 acres.

Together with Innovation Park (located near the campus of the University of Notre Dame), Ignition Park is a part of South Bend's two-site state-certified technology park.

== History of site ==
Studebaker, whose plant once occupied the site, had been the city's biggest employer before its 1963 closure.

== Inception of Ignition Park ==
Ignition Park was announced in 2008. It represented the municipal government's response to a decision in 2008 by the Semiconductor Research Corporation's Nanoelectronics Research Initiative (NRI) to locate the fourth of its national research centers, known as the Midwest Institute for Nanoelectronics Discovery (MIND), at the University of Notre Dame. Plans were for the park to concentrate on high-potential technologies and ventures, as well as the commercialization of nanotechnology concepts inspired by MIND.

Ignition Park is one of the two locations that jointly make up Indiana's first two-site state-certified technology park. The other is Innovation Park at Notre Dame, located on 12 acres (49,000 m^{2}) on the city's northeast side adjacent to the Notre Dame campus. Innovation Park, developed through a partnership between South Bend and the University of Notre Dame, opened its doors in 2009, and is targeted towards academic research and fostering startup companies. It has been the hope of planners that the companies that that startup at Innovation Park might, once they get their footing, choose to move to Ignition Park when establishing their permanent location. This would keep those startups formed at Innovation Park in the South Bend area. Innovation Park has been described by leadership as acting as a "commercialization bridge" where companies can be located in their period of transition between basic research and building more permanent operations at Ignition Park. South Bend's dual-site technology park (consisting of Ignition Park and Innovation Park) has aimed to compete with technology parks in Chicago and other areas of Illinois.

The technology park's location benefitted from the presence of a fiber-optic trunkline located along the nearby rail corridor. Because of that, Comcast is able to provide tenants of Ignition Park access to its backbone network, which, as of 2014, provided customers with 100-gigabit-per-second service.

== Development of Ignition Park ==
By 2011, the city of South Bend had already spent $32 million on planning, property acquisition, environmental work, and demolition for the development of the Ignition Park site, with tens of millions of further dollars of spending anticipated.

In 2011, Dana Realty, which had been operating out of Innovation Park, broke ground on a 45,000 square foot (4,200 m^{2}) data center in Ignition Park, which it opened in 2012, giving the park its first tenant. For a few years, it would be the park's lone tenant.

In 2014, Great Lakes Capital bought 13 acres (5.3 ha) of land in the park which they would be permitted to construct up to four buildings on, with the option of acquiring an addition 11 acres (4.5 ha) that they could then build a further four buildings on. In 2016, the company finished $12 million of construction on two buildings named "Calayst One" and "Catalyst Two". The buildings contain 90,000 square feet (8,400 m^{2}) of space, and are designed with tech firms as their target tenants. Among the first tenants of the Catalyst Two building was the $36 million Notre Dame Turbomachinery Laboratory.

In June 2018, the South Bend Redevelopment Commissioned approved $2.7 million to develop the new 12,000 square foot (1,100 m^{2}) Technology Resource Center in the Catalyst Two building. This "collaboration hub" opened in November 2019.

A partnership between Carrier Global and the University of Notre Dame saw the February 2022 opening of the Willis Carrier Centrifugal Compressor Technology Laboratory, which is meant to provide Notre Dame University students with hands-on experience in the development of HVAC compressors. Carrier intends to utilize the technology that the lab will develop in order to assist the company in meeting its goals for making its products more environmentally-friendly. Carrier and the university agreed to a three-year collaboration, which also saw the creation of the Carrier Center of Excellence at the park's existing Notre Dame Turbomachinery Laboratory.

In December 2019, Press Ganey Associates started construction on a new national headquarters building in the park. Press Ganey was the fifth-largest employer in the South Bend region by that time. The 82,064 square foot (7,624.0 m^{2}) building was completed in 2021. In January 2022, NAS Investments bought the building, and will serve as its property manager.
