= Hitting Home PAC =

Political action committee

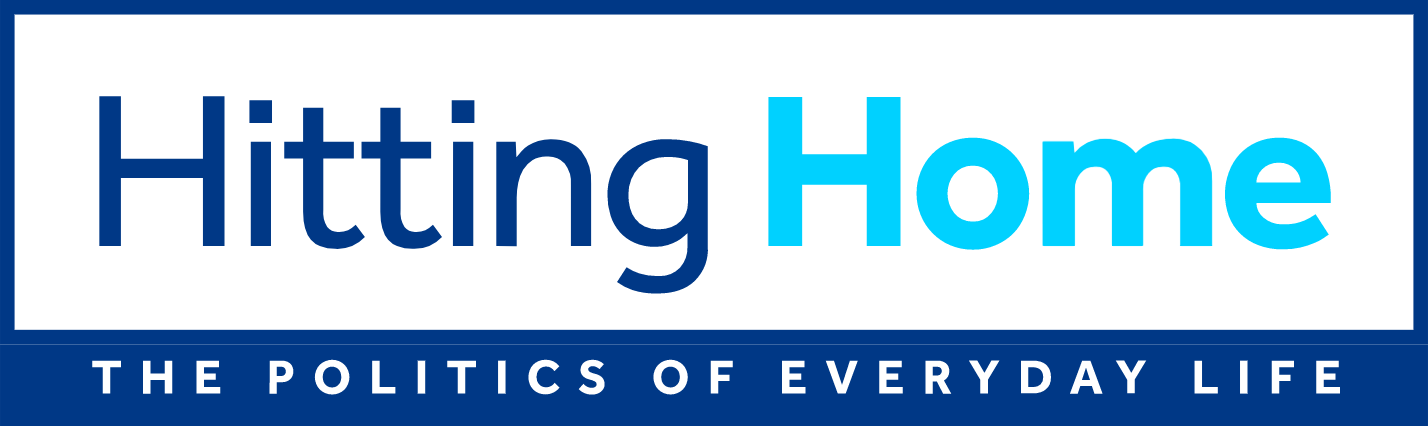
Logo

Hitting Home PAC was a 527 organization founded by Pete Buttigieg in 2017. Buttigieg launched the PAC in June 2017, several months after his failed bid for the Democratic National Committee chairmanship in its 2017 election.

Hitting Home PAC was a Carey committee, also known as a "Hybrid PAC", a type of 527 organization which is a hybrid of a super PAC and traditional PAC. The organization aimed to support the Democratic Party in the 2018 election cycle. It aimed to refocus the party to place an emphasis on the message that it would "protect and support people going about their lives." Buttigieg stated a desire for the PAC to focus on supporting heartland Democrats.

It was shut down in May 2019, amid Buttigieg's presidential campaign.

== Expenditures ==
The PAC raised $403,503, and spent nearly all of it by the end of the 2018 election cycle. A total of $399,267 was spent by the PAC during the 2018 cycle. Before being shut down in 2019, the PAC raised an additional $5,970 and spent an additional $10,206 in the 2020 cycle.

Only 10% of the PAC's spending directly supported candidates, with a mere $37,000 given to candidates. This has led to an accusation by HuffPost that the PAC did little but spend money to boost Buttigieg's image. Of the $37,000 given directly to candidates, $36,000 was distributed among 22 different Democratic candidates for the United States House of Representatives. The sole United States Senate candidate to receive a contribution from the PAC was fellow Indiana politician, Joe Donnelly, who received $1,000.

The PAC paid $70,000 to Lis Smith, who served as Buttigieg's spokesperson and subsequently became the communications director for his presidential bid. The PAC paid $27,500 to Michael Schmuhl, who was the PAC's treasurer and subsequently became Buttigieg's presidential campaign manager. The PAC's finance director was paid $34,500. A major Democratic media consulting firm was paid $28,500.

2018 candidate recipients of Hitting Home PAC Funds
Candidate	House or Senate	State	District	Amount given	Won or lost
Clarke Tucker	House	Arkansas	AR-2	$1,500	Lost
Jason Crow	House	Colorado	CO-6	$1,500	Won
Lauren Underwood	House	Illinois	IL-14	$2,000	Won
Abby Finkenauer	House	Iowa	IA-1	$2,000	Won
Dave Loebsack	House	Iowa	IA-2	$500	Won
Sharice Davids	House	Kansas	KS-3	$2,000	Won
Amy McGrath	House	Kentucky	KY-6	$2,000	Lost
Elissa Slotkin	House	Michigan	MI-8	$1,500	Won
Haley Stevens	House	Michigan	MI-11	$1,500	Won
Daniel Feehan	House	Minnesota	MN-1	$1,500	Lost
Steven Horsford	House	Nevada	NV-4	$1,500	Won
Chris Pappas	House	New Hampshire	NH-1	$2,000	Won
Andy Kim	House	New Jersey	NJ-3	$1,500	Won
Max Rose	House	New York	NY-11	$1,500	Won
Dan McCready	House	North Carolina	NC-9	$2,000	Lost
Aftab Pureval	House	Ohio	OH-1	$1,500	Lost
Ken Harbaugh	House	Ohio	OH-7	$2,000	Won
Chrissy Houlahan	House	Pennsylvania	PA-6	$2,000	Won
Joseph Kopser	House	Texas	TX-21	$1,000	Lost
Gina Ortiz Jones	House	Texas	TX-23	$2,000	Lost
Colin Allred	House	Texas	TX-32	$1,500	Won
Abigail Spanberger	House	Virginia	VA-7	$1,500	Won
Joe Donnelly	Senate	Indiana	-	$1,000	Lost
