= 2011 South Bend mayoral election =

- November 8, 2011
- Turnout: 20.29%
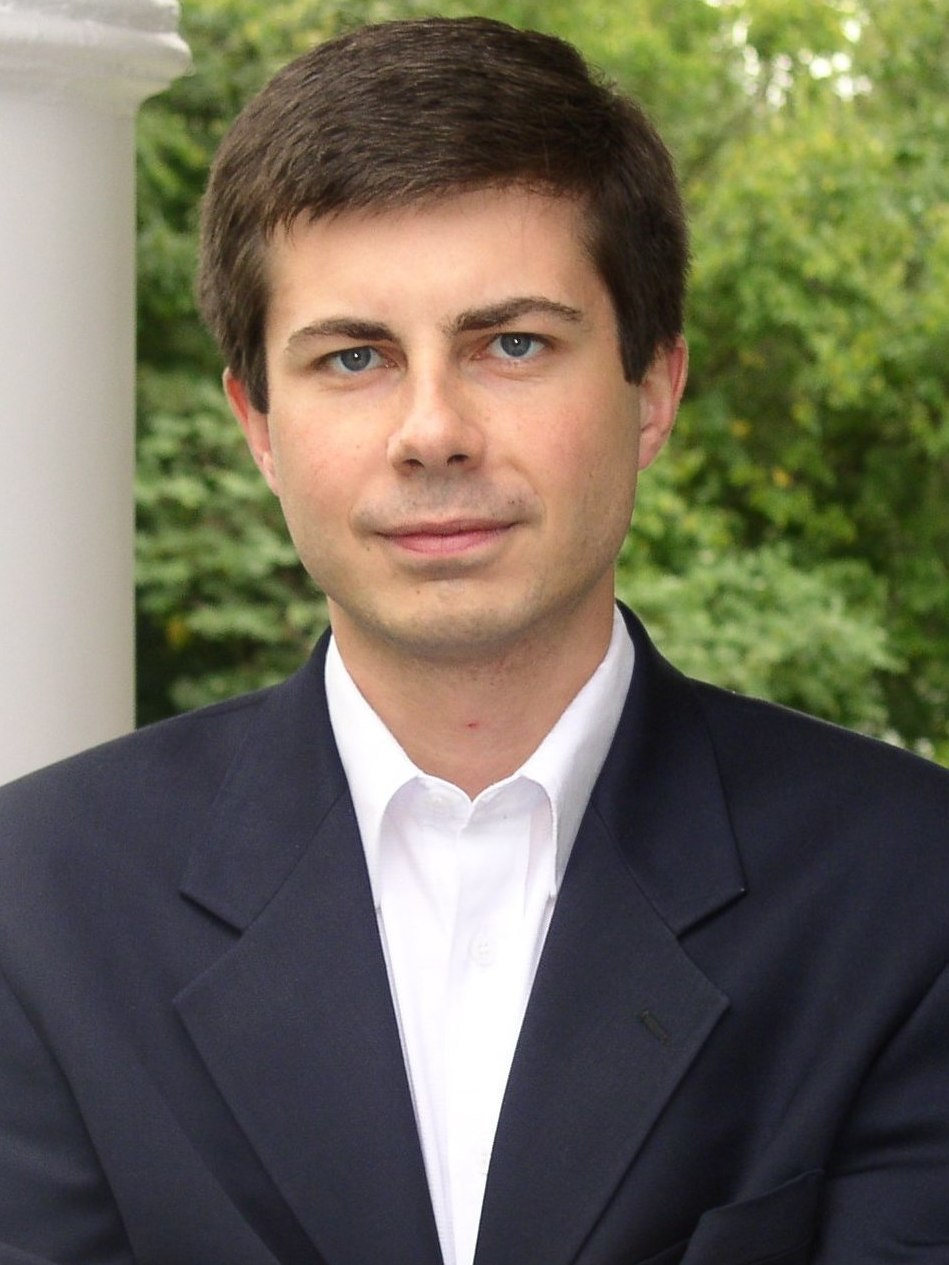

Nominee	Pete Buttigieg	Norris W. Curry, Jr	Patrick M. Farrell
Party	Democratic	Republican	Libertarian
Popular vote	10,991	2,884	1,008
Percentage	73.85%	19.38%	6.77%
Mayor before election
Steve Luecke
Democratic
Elected mayor
Pete Buttigieg
Democratic

The 2011 South Bend, Indiana mayoral election was held on November 8, 2011.

After serving for fourteen years, incumbent mayor Steve Luecke announced that he would not seek reelection. Luecke's decision not to run for reelection made the 2011 election the first open election for mayor of South Bend in 24 years.

The election was won by Pete Buttigieg, who, at 29 years of age, became the youngest mayor, at the time, of a United States city with a population greater than 100,000.

The election coincided with races for the Common Council and for South Bend City Clerk.

== Background ==
The election coincided with races for the Municipal Council and for South Bend City Clerk.

After serving for fourteen years, incumbent mayor Steve Luecke announced that he would not seek reelection. Luecke's decision not to run for reelection made the 2011 election the first open election for mayor of South Bend in 24 years. His decision not to seek reelection was considered a surprise, and initiated a large rush of candidates declaring that they would seek to succeed him as mayor.

South Bend was regarded to be a Democratic-leaning city. A Republican had not been elected mayor of the city in the four decades, since Lloyd Allen won his second term in 1967. In December 2020, David Varner, the only Republican on the South Bend Common Council was quoted by the South Bend Tribune as opining that there was a strong unlikeliness of a Republican victory in the city's upcoming mayoral election. Varner pointed to Joe Donnelly's strong victory across South Bend in the 2010 congressional election, despite a Republican wave election that year. Jack Cowell of the South Bend Tribune predicted that the Democratic primary would be tantamount to election.

== Nominations ==
Primaries were held for the Democratic Party and Republican parties on May 3.

During the primaries, St. Joseph County, where South Bend is located, saw voter turnout of 16% in its various primary elections. This was an increase of 6% from the primaries four years prior.

Absentee voting ballots in the South Bend primaries numbered at 2,539.

=== Democratic primary ===
Democratic candidates included failed 2010 Indiana State treasurer candidate Pete Buttigieg, state representative Ryan Dvorak, high school teacher and St. Joseph Councilman Michael Hamann, reverend and former Clinton administration staffer Barrett Berry, and attorney Felipe Merino. Individuals who had previously been running, but were not included on the ballot because they either dropped-out or were disqualified from running, included Mark Dollinger, a business services representative at Work One (Indiana's workforce development agency) and the former manager of the city's Weed and Seed program.

Incumbent mayor Stephen Luecke abstained from endorsing any candidate ahead of the primary.

Dvorak was initially seen as having some potential advantages, such as media coverage of the state legislature and the fact that his father, Michael Dvorak, was the county prosecutor. Dvorak had never before lost an election campaign. Due to his strong name recognition, Dvorak was initially regarded as the frontrunner. However, his position as a State Senator, requiring him to travel frequently to the state capital of Indianapolis, limited the ability for him to directly campaign in South Bend compared to his opponents. Furthermore, during the campaign, Dvorak was involved in the Indiana legislative walkouts, which caused him to spend a significant part of his candidacy out-of-town in Illinois. Dvorak had strong labor support, which he helped shore up by participating in the Indiana legislative walkouts.

Buttigieg had entered the race with very little name recognition. As a candidate, Buttigieg outlined a platform for his prospective mayoralty. This included an economic plan which promised to assist responsible existing employers grow, cultivate "new homegrown businesses of tomorrow", have the city compete both nationally and globally for investments, create "well-coordinated and user-friendly" economic development, confront poverty, and make investments in human capital and quality of life. He outlined an action plan for these economic priorities in April. Buttigieg also declared, “This election is about jobs, and the top priority of the next mayor has to be on putting people to work in good jobs. I have the most experience when it comes to business and economics. I’m the only candidate who has been involved in multibillion dollar decisions in the private sector, with some of the world’s top firms.” Buttigieg's campaign manager, Mike Schmuhl, had previously been the campaign manager on Joe Donnelly's 2010 congressional campaign. Buttigieg was ultimately supported by former mayors Roger Parent and Joe E. Kernan (the latter also being a former governor). Additionally, in its first-ever mayoral endorsement, the Chamber of Commerce of St. Joseph County endorsed Buttigieg's candidacy. Buttigieg was also endorsed by the South Bend Tribune in its first-ever mayoral primary endorsement and the South Bend's chapter of the International Association of Fire Fighters.

Barrett Berry, a local pastor, was well known for hosting a radio program. Berry had returned to South Bend three years prior after an extended career working in federal government which not only included roles in the Clinton administration, but also had included an assignment as a control officer for the United States Department of State in Nairobi after the 1998 United States embassy bombings. Berry served on several local boards, including the St. Joseph County Area Planning Commission, to which he had been appointed by mayor Luecke.

Michael Hamann promoted himself as, "the only candidate with proven executive experience." Hamann had been a St. Joseph county commissioner from 1999 through 2003, and was now a St. Joseph County Councilman representing a district which covered northwest South Bend and northwest St. Joseph County. When he previously served as a county commissioner Hamann had been a member of the Republican Party. He had also been a teacher for 26 years, and was also running a communications and marketing firm. Calling the city's unemployment rate, "unacceptably high," Hamann pledged to attract well-paying employers to the city. Hamann also pledged that, if elected, he would aggressively demolish abandoned neighborhoods in order to generate neighborhood revitalization and in order to combat crime. While St. Joseph County Democratic Chairman Butch Morgan refrained from formally endorsing any candidate, he privately supported Hamann. Hamann also received the endorsement of Citizens for Community Values Indiana.

Felipe Merino, an attorney, stated he was running because, "we need businesses, we need investment, we need somebody to take care of graffiti, somebody to fill our potholes, we need somebody who is going to make sure that the west side and the east side of South Bend are both being taken care of." He dropped out of the race in March, citing unspecified "personal issues". However, by state law, his name would remain on the ballot. After dropping-out, he endorsed Dvorak.

Buttigieg out-fundraised the other candidates. Buttigieg began to lead the pack in fundraising as early as January 2011. By April 8, Buttigieg had raised $230,000 for his campaign. Dvorak had raised $100,000. Hamann had raised $56,000.

Had they been successful in their efforts to be elected mayor, either Berry (who is African American) or Merino (who is hispanic) would have been the first ethnic minority to be elected to a full-time executive office in St. Joseph County. No ethnic minority would be elected to a full-time executive office in St. Joseph County until the 2015 South Bend City Clerk election was won by Kareemah Fowler.

In February the race was described as being "wide open", with polls showing that 60% of voters had not even yet learned that Luecke was retiring.

In mid-March, a poll conducted by the Feldman Group found Buttigieg and Dvorak to be in a virtual tie, both garnering roughly 30%. Roughly a quarter of voters were undecided. The race had widely come to be seen as being primarily a contest between Buttigieg and Dvorak.

On April 9 a debate was held at Indiana University South Bend, sponsored by Indiana University South Bend's American Democracy Project and Political Science Club as well as the League of Women Voters of the South Bend Area.

By mid-April, the election was still regarded to be a close-race between Buttigieg and Dvorak, with Hamann being seen as a third-place candidate trying to push his way back towards contention.

Late in the race, Dvorak swiftly turned negative in campaigning against Buttigieg, a move which backfired. Additionally, Hamann garnered sympathy after the tragic death of his wife, which occurred in mid-April. These two factors compounded, and Dvorak fell to third place.

==== Polling ====
In mid-March, a poll conducted by the Feldman Group found Buttigieg and Dvorak to be in a virtual tie, both garnering roughly 30%. Roughly a quarter of voters were undecided.

By mid-April, the election was regarded to be a close-race between Buttigieg and Dvorak, with Hamann being seen as a third-place candidate trying to push his way back towards contention. At this time, internal polls from the Buttigieg and Dvorak campaigns showed that Barrett Berry was in fourth place among candidates. At this time, both the Dvorak and Buttigieg campaigns, and their allies, shared that they had internal polling showed their candidate in the lead. For instance, by April two internal polls showed Buttigieg with leads of 2 and 14 percent. State representative Craig Fry reported having seen internal polling which showed Dvorak with a lead.

Poll source	Date(s) administered	Sample size	Margin of error	Barrett Berry	Pete Buttigieg	Ryan Dvorak	Michael Hamann
Feldman Group	Mid-March	400	± 5%	4%	32%	30%	12%

==== Results ====
Buttigieg ultimately won what was considered a surprisingly strong victory in the primary. Due to the contest featuring four serious contenders for the nomination, experts had predicted that the victor would only carry roughly a third of the vote.

Buttigieg benefited from large crossover voting in support of him, with one analysis finding that he received the votes of up to 3,000 Republicans.

Voter turnout in the primary was much greater than had been predicted. This was largely due to Republican crossover voting. Some predictions for turnout were as low as 8,000. The median prediction had roughly been 11,000.

Democratic primary results
Party	Candidate	Votes	%
Democratic	Pete Buttigieg	7,663	54.90
Democratic	Michael J. Hamann	2,798	20.05
Democratic	Ryan Dvorak	2,041	14.62
Democratic	Barrett Berry	1,424	10.20
Democratic	Felipe N. Merino	32	0.23
Total votes		13,958	100

=== Republican primary ===
By April, Norris W. Curry, also known as Wayne Curry, had already established himself as the broad frontrunner in the Republican primary. Curry, a carpenter and construction contractor, had won the support of the local Republican establishment ahead of the primary. Curry also was considered the best-known individual among those contending for the Republican nomination, and was also the most visible campaigner. Curry had previously run unsuccessfully for an at-large city council seat in 2007, as well as a county council seat in 2008. Curry had some experience in government and community projects, including having served as chairman for the Economic Development Panel of South Bend's City Plan process from 2003 through 2006. He had also served as treasurer for both the Community Oriented Policing Leadership Council and the North East Neighborhood Council. Curry's initial plans for 2011 were to run for the 4th district seat on the South Bend City Council, but he ultimately changed his mind and ran for mayor instead. Curry stated that he considered the "biggest asset" of the city to be its residents. Curry hoped to be the nominee so that he could present an alternative to Democratic rule in the city, which he critiqued for having what he considered a "grossly" flawed "direction and philosophy for which they base their decisions on". He claimed declining population, business, and jobs in the city were evidence of failed Democratic leadership, and declared that he would reverse these trends if elected.

Also running in the Republican primary was William F. "Bill" Davis, a self-proclaimed "independent" who had challenged mayor Luecke for the Democratic nomination in the previous election. He had also run for other offices in the past, with his most recent campaign having been a 2008 St. Joseph County Commissioner's election in which he had received 40% of the vote. Davis was described by local reporter Ralph Heibutzki as the "least conventional" candidate in either party's primary. He received media attention for his troublesome history, which included periods in which he had stayed in prisons and in mental hospitals. Davis argued that his history was less relevant than the platform on which he was running. His platform was focused on revitalizing neighborhoods, which he argued was critical to improving the economic fortunes of the city. He declared that, as mayor, he would have made it less difficult to purchase vacant houses for public use.

Additionally running was Wilson R. Taylor II, also known as Will Taylor. Like the other Republican candidates, Taylor also made vacant properties a focal point of his candidacy. Taylor's career was as a real estate investor who flipped properties. He declared that the city had been too aggressive in demolishing vacant homes. At the time of the campaign, he was even suing the city's code enforcement department for not permitting him to repair a condemned property. Taylor promised to make overhauling the code enforcement department a priority. He declared that he would not change most other city departments, as he believed them to be efficiently functioning. Taylor also promised to make anti-drug efforts a priority.

The South Bend Tribune, which prior to 2011, had never endorsed in mayoral primaries, gave their endorsement in the Republican primary to Curry.

==== Results ====
The turnout in the Republican primary was, at the time, the lowest Republican primary turnout in modern South Bend mayoral election history.

Republican primary results
Party	Candidate	Votes	%
Republican	Norris W. Curry, Jr.	655	65.83
Republican	William F. Davis	248	24.93
Republican	Wilson R. Taylor II	92	9.25
Total votes		995	100

== General election ==
During the race, Buttigieg was seen as the heavy favorite to win. While the Democratic nomination was roughly considered to be tantamount to election, making the general election largely pro forma, Buttigieg refused to take a victory for granted declaring that, “The political graveyard is filled with people who took it for granted".

During his primary campaign, Buttigieg had spent nearly all of the funds he had raised, subsequently justifying this by declaring, "We didn’t want to lose a squeaker and have a lot left in the tank." He continued to raise additional funds in the general election.

Buttigieg stated that his top economic priority for South Bend was customer service, arguing that it was important for the city to provide a more efficient response to local businesses and businesses seeking to locate in the city. He believed that this could be accomplished by establishing a single point of contact for business services that would be tasked with communicating efficiently with businesses. He stated that a top priority for him as mayor would be partnering with the board and superintendent of the South Bend Community School Corporation to improve collaboration between the city government and the schools.

Curry issued a 13-point plan for economic development. Curry also had plans for neighborhoods, education/children, and crime reduction. Curry continued discussing plans to address abandoned properties.

Joining both Curry and Buttigieg in the general election was Libertarian Party nominee Patrick M. Farrell. He argued that local politics was primarily responsible for what he called the "demise" of South Bend, faulting both of the major parties for this. In an op-ed published in the South Bend Tribune, Farrell wrote that he was running to, "be a steward of the people's trust".

In the midst of the campaign, Buttigieg spent two weeks away from the campaign trail because he was called to service in San Diego as part of his duties in the United States Navy Reserve.

Buttigieg sought to run a general election campaign that was unified with the campaigns of candidates running in the coinciding council elections.

A debate was held between the three candidates at Indiana University South Bend on October 27. The debate was sponsored by Indiana University South Bend's American Democracy Project and Political Science Club as well as the League of Women Voters of the South Bend Area.

=== Results ===
Turnout in the general election was 20.29%.

Buttigieg won all of the city's 91 voting precincts. These included several heavily Republican precincts in the city's 5th district. Some of western South Bend's heavily African American precincts gave Buttigieg some of his greatest levels of support in the general election.

The election made Buttigieg, sworn in at 29 years of age, the youngest mayor, at the time, of a United States city with a population greater than 100,000. Buttigieg also became the second-youngest mayor in South Bend history, after Schuyler Colfax III, who was elected mayor at age 28 in 1898.

General election results
Party	Candidate	Votes	%
Democratic	Pete Buttigieg	10,991	73.85
Republican	Norris W. Curry Jr.	2,884	19.38
Libertarian	Patrick M. Farrell	1,008	6.77
Total votes		14,883	100

== See also ==
- Mayoralty of Pete Buttigieg
