= Michael Dvorak =

American politician

St. Joseph County Prosecutor
- In office January 2003 – January 2015
- Preceded by: Chris Toth
- Succeeded by: Ken Cotter

Member of the Indiana House of Representatives from the 8th district
- In office November 1986 – November 6, 2002
- Preceded by: Lloyd Taylor
- Succeeded by: Ryan Dvorak

Personal details
- Born: October 24, 1948 (age 77)
- Party: Democratic
- Spouse: Kathleen
- Children: 8 (including Ryan)
- Education: Loyola University Chicago (BA); Western State College of Law (JD)
- Profession: Lawyer

Michael A. Dvorak (born October 24, 1948) is an American lawyer and politician who formerly served as an Indiana State Representative and the St. Joseph County, Indiana, prosecutor.

== Early life ==
Dvorak was born October 24, 1948, in South Bend, Indiana.

Dvorak earned a Bachelor of Arts from Loyola University Chicago in 1970. He earned a Juris Doctor from Western State College of Law in 1975. He was admitted to the State Bar of California in 1975 and the Indiana State Bar Association in 1977.

== Career ==
Dvorak served as a deputy prosecutor in Modesto, California, from 1975 through 1977. He worked in private legal practice from 1977 through 2002. He also worked as a public defender in South Bend, Indiana, from 1977 through 1986.

In 1984, Dvorak ran for the Democratic Party nomination for the 8th district seat in the Indiana House of Representatives, but lost a four-way primary election.

=== State representative ===
In 1986, Dvorak ran again for the 8th district seat in the Indiana House of Representatives, this time succeeding in securing the Democratic Nomination. Dvorak defeated three-term Republican incumbent Lloyd Taylor in the general election. His victory was considered an upset.

Dvorak left office in 2002, being succeeded by his son Ryan Dvorak.

=== St. Joseph County prosecutor ===
Dvorak successfully ran for St. Joseph County prosecutor in 2002, defeating Republican incumbent Chris Toth.

Dvorak was sworn in in 2003.

On December 16, 2010, Dvorak announced that he would not to file any criminal charges against Prince Shembo, who had been accused of sexual assault by Lizzy Seeberg nine days prior to her suicide.

In 2015, Dvorak opted against seeking reelection. Democratic nominee Ken Cotter, a longtime staffer of Dvorak, was elected to succeed him.

== Personal life ==
Dvorak is a Roman Catholic.

Dvorak and his wife Kathleen had eight children, Ryan, Todd, Sean, Brett, Carrie, Brady, Casey, and Tyler.

For decades, Dvorak has resided in Granger, Indiana.

In 1980, Dvorak began a decades-long involvement as a Michiana Soccer Association youth soccer coach.

Dvorak has served as president of the Quail Valley Homeowners Association.
