= Ryan Dvorak =

American politician from Indiana

Member of the Indiana House of Representatives from the 8th district
- Incumbent
- Assumed office November 6, 2002
- Preceded by: Michael Dvorak

Personal details
- Party: Democratic
- Spouse: Angela
- Education: University of Notre Dame (BS); Indiana University, Indianapolis (JD)
- Profession: Attorney

Ryan Michael Dvorak is an American politician from the state of Indiana. A member of the Democratic Party, Dvorak is a member of the Indiana House of Representatives, representing the 8th District since 2002.

== Biography ==
After graduating from Penn High School in 1992, Dvorak earned a B.A. in Philosophy from the University of Notre Dame (1996), and a J.D. from the Indiana University Robert H. McKinney School of Law (2008). Ryan is also a practicing attorney with May Oberfell Lorber, the oldest law firm in northern Indiana.

Dvorak served as a senior aide to Congressman Tim Roemer in Indiana and Washington, D.C. from 1996 to 2001. Dvorak ran Roemer's successful 1998 and 2000 congressional campaigns. He was elected to the Indiana House of Representatives in 2002, becoming chairman of the Committee on Courts and Criminal Code in 2003. In 2012 he was named the Assistant Democratic Leader.

He lives in South Bend with his wife, Angela, and their dog and three children, Caroline, Charlotte, and Jack

== Political career ==
While serving as a senior legislative aide to Congressman Tim Roemer, Dvorak took leaves of absence to manage Roemer's successful re-election campaigns in 1998 against Dan Holtz, and in 2000 against Chris Chocola.

In 2002, Dvorak filed as a candidate for the open State House seat that had been held since 1986 by his father, Michael A. Dvorak, who had left the Legislature to be elected St. Joseph County Prosecutor. Ryan Dvorak won the 2002 election, defeating Republican Carl Baxmeyer by a 55%-45% margin.

Dvorak was unopposed for re-election in 2004. In 2006, he defeated Democrat Dorothy Snyder in the Primary election by a margin of 93%-7% and was unopposed in the general election.

In the 2008 general election, Dvorak defeated Republican challenger Dale DeVon by a margin of 65%-35%.

Republican Dick Pfeil challenged Dvorak the first time in the 2010 general election, which Dvorak won by a margin of 55%-45%.

In 2011, Dvorak unsuccessfully sought the Democratic nomination in the South Bend Mayoral Primary election.

Dick Pfeil sought a re-match against Dvorak in the 2012 general election in the re-districted 8th House District, but Dvorak defeated him again by the same margin of 55%-45%.

Dvorak was a key leader in a 2012 leadership struggle that ousted longtime Democratic Leader B. Patrick Bauer from power in the House Democratic Caucus. The leadership change resulted in Rep. Linda Lawson being elected interim caucus Leader. After the 2012 elections, Lawson was succeeded by Rep. Scott Pelath, who appointed Dvorak Assistant Democratic Leader.

== On the issues ==
Dvorak has been recognized across Indiana as the leading legislative expert on renewable energy policy. He has authored legislation on net metering, renewable energy standards, and enforcing accountability for utility companies.

Dvorak has been honored by the Hoosier Chapter of the Sierra Club for Outstanding Achievement, named a Michiana 40 Under 40 honoree, and received Legislator of the Year by both the Indiana Aviation Association, and the Indiana Conservation Alliance.
