= WelcomePAC =

Democratic political action committee

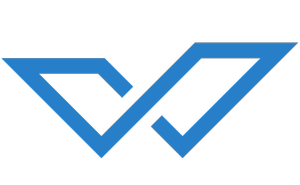
- Formation: September 16, 2021; 4 years ago
- Founder: Lauren Harper; Liam Kerr
- Registration no.: C00786830
- Legal status: Hybrid PAC
- Website: WelcomePAC.org

WelcomePAC is a political action committee that recruits and supports candidates affiliated with the centrist Blue Dog Coalition of the United States Democratic Party.

The group launched during the 2022 midterm election cycle and has been described by the New York Times as a "Democratic-aligned outfit that applies insurgent tactics to support center-left candidates in swing districts". The organization's co-founder has articulated its aim to "become the Justice Democrats of the political center".

The organization is registered with the Federal Election Commission as a hybrid PAC and raised more than $2 million in its inaugural cycle to support Democrats and oppose Republicans in Ohio and California. According to the magazine New York, WelcomePAC is funded by billionaires Reid Hoffman, Michael Bloomberg, James Murdoch and his wife Kathryn, Rory Gates, the Walton family, and Joe Manchin and Heather Manchin's centrist Americans Together organization.

== Direct action work ==
=== Ohio State House recruitment and endorsements ===
In early 2022, WelcomePAC conducted a campaign to recruit "big tent" candidates for the Ohio House of Representatives in the state's Northeast region. Later in the cycle, the group endorsed 17 state legislature candidates with a commitment to "building a big tent Democratic Party that welcomes in independents and moderate Republicans" in Ohio. In July 2022, the Ohio Capitol Journal reported that LinkedIn co-founder Reid Hoffman had made contributions to WelcomePAC's endorsed state legislature candidates.

=== Ohio Senate split ticket campaign ===
In late 2022, WelcomePAC organized a series of press conferences throughout Ohio featuring local leaders with Republican backgrounds supporting Democratic Congressman Tim Ryan's campaign for Senate against Republican author and venture capitalist JD Vance. The group also ran digital advertisements in the state, encouraging voters who had split their tickets between Republican Governor Mike DeWine and Democratic Senator Sherrod Brown in 2018 to consider voting for Ryan in 2022.

In late October 2022, the group announced an advertising campaign to persuade both moderate and Trump-aligned Republicans not to vote for JD Vance and encourage them to split their tickets in support of Tim Ryan. The six-figure campaign consisted of print, radio, and digital ads. Despite unexpectedly competitive poll numbers against Vance, Ryan received minimal support from national Democratic Party committees. According to Dayton-based NBC News affiliate WDTN, WelcomePAC was the only national Democratic group to invest significantly in supporting Ryan's campaign. In November 2022, Ryan lost the race for Senate.

=== Activities in California's 41st congressional district ===
WelcomePAC supported Democrat Will Rollins against Republican Representative Ken Calvert in the 2022 race for California's 41st congressional district. Rollins lost to Calvert in the November general election.
