= Mike Schmuhl =

Chair of the Indiana Democratic Party

Chair of the Indiana Democratic Party
- In office March 20, 2021 – March 15, 2025
- Preceded by: John Zody
- Succeeded by: Karen Tallian

Personal details
- Born: 1983 (age 41–42) South Bend, Indiana, U.S.
- Political party: Democratic
- Education: University of Notre Dame (BA); Sciences Po (MA)

Michael Schmuhl (born 1983) is an American political figure formerly serving as the chair of the Indiana Democratic Party. Schmuhl previously managed the Pete Buttigieg 2020 presidential campaign. Schmuhl worked for more than a year as Buttigieg's chief of staff during Buttigieg's South Bend, Indiana mayoralty.

== Early life and education ==
Schmuhl was born and raised in South Bend, Indiana. His father is Robert Schmuhl, an emeritus professor of American Studies at the University of Notre Dame. Schmuhl went to high school at St. Joseph High School, where he befriended a young Pete Buttigieg. Their fathers were also friends, both working as professors at Notre Dame.

He graduated from University of Notre Dame in 2005 with a bachelor's degree in history. His uncle William Schmuhl, has also taught at the university. He later received a master's degree in international affairs from the Paris Institute of Political Studies.

== Career ==
In 2004, Schmuhl was an intern at Meet the Press with Tim Russert at NBC News in Washington, D.C. He then worked at The Washington Post, where he was a producer and booker in the newsroom.

He returned to Indiana in 2009 and managed Joe Donnelly's 2010 successful congressional reelection campaign.

Schmuhl reconnected with his high school friend Pete Buttigieg, and managed his 2011 campaign for Mayor of South Bend, Indiana.

In October 2011, after Butch Morgan resigned from his role as Democratic chairman for Indiana's 2nd congressional district, Schmuhl agreed to run for the position. He was elected to the position in November in a vote of by the county chairs and vice chairs from the counties of the district.

When Buttigieg assumed the office of mayor in January 2012, he named Schmuhl as his chief of staff. Schmuhl stepped down from this position in May 2013. He resigned from the job in order to pursue a master's degree at Sciences Po in Paris, France.

Schmuhl returned to the United States in 2015 and began working at the Democratic consulting firm 270 Strategies in Chicago.

Schmuhl advised Indiana congressional candidates Shelli Yoder and Mel Hall in 2016 and 2018, respectively, and he also served as treasurer of Buttigieg's hybrid PAC, Hitting Home PAC.

Schmuhl was campaign manager for Buttigieg's 2020 presidential campaign. Pete for America was the largest political campaign in Indiana history. Buttigieg became the first openly LGBTQ+ person to win presidential primary delegates and the first openly LGBTQ+ person to become a Senate-confirmed Cabinet secretary in American history.

Schmuhl has worked as a venture capitalist. After Buttigieg's campaign, Schmuhl began working at Heartland Ventures, a small venture capital firm located in South Bend. Schmuhl and a business partner also acquired Joe's Tavern, a historic bar in South Bend.

In 2021, Schmuhl successfully ran to succeed John Zody as chairman of the Indiana Democratic Party. Zody had opted against seeking a third four-year term as state party leader. On March 20, 2021, Schmuhl won the vote by the state central committee to be the state party chair, electing him to a four-year term as state party chairman. He defeated Morgan County Democratic Party leader Tom Wallace, his sole opponent after Trish Whitcomb withdrew days before the vote citing to her son's death. In addition, Myla Eldridge, who Schmuhl had chosen as his running mate by expressing his preference for her as state party vice chair, was elected by the state central committee to the position of vice chair in a separate vote. As chair, Schmuhl has received media attention for working to revive the Democratic Party in Indiana through a series of tours and for working to combat Republican misinformation and disinformation.

Schmuhl joined LangleyCyber, a cybersecurity firm, in October 2021. His title is Partner and Head of Political. In 2022, Democratic National Committee (DNC) Chairman Jaime Harrison appointed Schmuhl to the DNC's executive committee.

== See also ==
- Mayor Pete (film)

Party political offices
Preceded by John Zody	Chair of the Indiana Democratic Party; 2021–2025	Succeeded by Karen Tallian
