= John Zody =

Chair of the Indiana Democratic Party

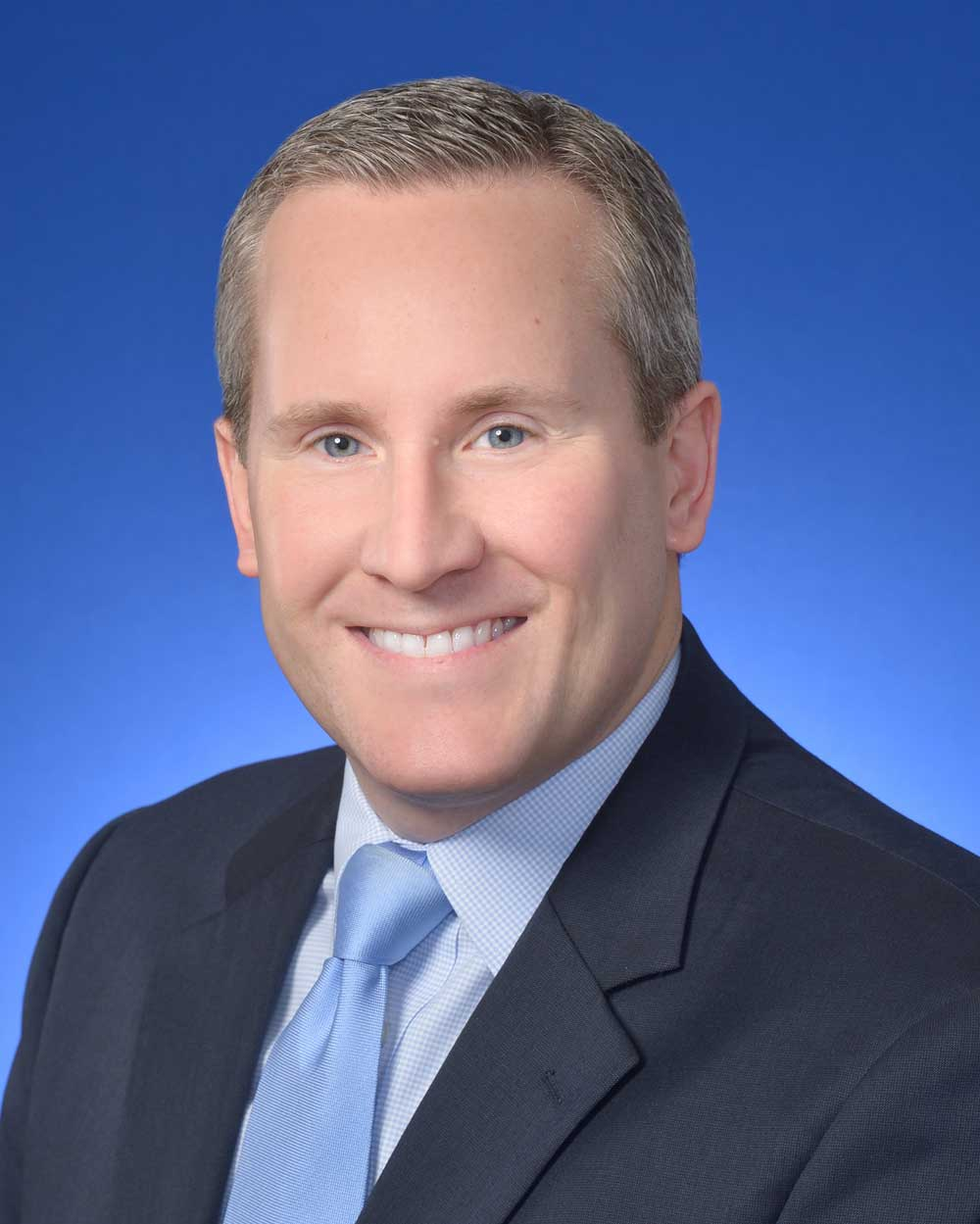

Chair of the Indiana Democratic Party
- In office March 16, 2013 – March 20, 2021
- Preceded by: Dan Parker
- Succeeded by: Mike Schmuhl

Personal details
- Born: John Chastain Zody; March 31, 1977 (age 48) Vigo County, Indiana, U.S.
- Party: Democratic
- Education: Indiana University Bloomington (BS, MPA)

John Chastain Zody (born March 31, 1977) is an American public servant, educator, and politician who served as the Chair of the Indiana Democratic Party from March 2013 to March 2021. Zody is also an adjunct instructor at the O'Neill School of Public and Environmental Affairs at Indiana University Bloomington, teaching classes on electoral law and processes, as well as leadership and ethics. Zody was previously the Great Lakes-Mid Atlantic Political Director on the 2012 re-election campaign of President Barack Obama, and formerly served as Chief of Staff for U.S. Representative Baron Hill from Indiana's Ninth Congressional District from 2009 to 2011. On November 14, 2019, Zody announced that he would be a 2020 Democratic candidate for Indiana State Senate in the 40th District, which includes most of Monroe County, Indiana. Since 2021, Zody has worked as a community development professional, serving as Director of Housing & Neighborhood Development for the City of Bloomington, Indiana until 2024 and is currently serving as the Executive Director of CDFI Friendly Bloomington, an organization that works to bring community development investment to Bloomington and Southern Indiana.

== Education and early career ==
Born in Vigo County, Indiana, Zody grew up in Martinsville, Indiana, and graduated from Martinsville High School in 1995. He received his Bachelor and Master of Public Affairs from Indiana University's O'Neill School of Public and Environmental Affairs.

In 1999, Zody began service in Indiana state government, working in community development before serving as the deputy director of Communications and Planning for the late Governor Frank O'Bannon. Following O'Bannon's death, Zody continued in the same role for Governor Joe Kernan. In 2004, Zody began working for Ivy Tech Community College, where he had duties in workforce development and civic engagement – and later in resource development for the college's Bloomington campus. For his service in state government, Zody was awarded two Sagamores of the Wabash, at the time the highest honor bestowed by a governor on an Indiana citizen.

Following Congressman Baron Hill's re-election to the U.S. House of Representatives, Zody served as Hill's District Director and then as Chief of Staff in the 110th Congress. In 2012, Zody served on the re-election campaign of President Barack Obama as the Great Lakes-Mid Atlantic Political Director, where he had political duties in nine states and the District of Columbia.

== Chairman of the Indiana Democratic Party ==
On March 16, 2013, Zody was elected Chair of the Indiana Democratic Party, where he focused on growing the Party statewide by working with volunteers, county and district party organizations to recruit candidates for local, state and federal office. During his tenure, Indiana Democrats worked to diversify and modernize the organization through investments in data, field, and training. In the 2018 and 2019 Indiana elections, the Indiana Democratic Party ran more first-time, female and millennial candidates than ever before, and elected a historically diverse group of candidates to local office in the 2019 municipal elections. Zody also served as a member of the Democratic National Committee and was appointed by DNC Chair Tom Perez to the DNC Rules & Bylaws Committee, supporting and helping craft portions of major reforms to the Party following the 2016 Presidential election.

== 2020 candidacy for Indiana State Senate, District 40 ==
In November 2019, Zody announced his 2020 candidacy for Indiana State Senate, District 40, which covers most of Monroe County, Indiana. In the announcement, he promised to be an advocate for the district to fight for livable wages, voting rights and environmental sustainability, while pushing to fully fund early childhood and public education, as well as working to expand the right to vote in Indiana and eliminating partisan gerrymandering. Zody was defeated in the primary by Shelli Yoder, by a wide margin.

Party political offices
Preceded by Dan Parker	Chair of the Indiana Democratic Party; 2013–2021	Succeeded by Mike Schmuhl
