= Majority Democrats =

Hybrid political action committee

- Formation: July 2025; 1 year ago
- Executive Director: Rohan Patel
- Chairman: Jake Auchincloss
- Website: Official website

Majority Democrats is a hybrid political action committee (PAC) and super PAC launched in July 2025 by elected representatives from the Democratic Party. The group is led by Rohan Patel, a former executive at Tesla and Obama administration official. The group largely consists of moderate Democrats, and its inaugural chairman is Jake Auchincloss.

According to The New York Times, Majority Democrats incorporates the ideas of Democratic adviser Seth London, which he had laid out in a post-2024 election memo. London is himself a part of the Majority Democrats initiative. Pennsylvania lieutenant governor Austin Davis has described the committee as a "big tent."

== History ==
After the Democratic loss in the 2024 United States presidential election, news outlets like Politico and The New York Times reported on a four-page memo, dated November 11, addressed to "Discouraged Democrats", and written by former Obama administration, fundraiser and venture capitalist official Seth London. In the memo, London attributed the loss to identity politics, and suggested to build a faction within the party to support "charismatic, moderate officeholders" and advance market-friendly moderation, with observers seeing it as an attempt to revive Al From's DLC. The memo cited the DLC in calling for the creation of "a party within the party" to combat what he says was Democrats' excessive deference to progressive activists.

Majority Democrats was formed in July 2025 by a group of Democratic politicians in the aftermath of the election of Donald Trump. Its stated mission is to focus on "reshaping and growing the Democratic Party so that it can compete everywhere and improve the lives of the American people." The group consists of largely moderate Democrats in federal, state, and local office, including Ruben Gallego, Elissa Slotkin, Abigail Spanberger, Angie Craig, Brendan Boyle, Gabe Vasquez, George T. Whitesides, Marie Gluesenkamp Perez, Maggie Goodlander, Aftab Pureval, Ritchie Torres, and James Talarico. Approximately 30 politicians joined the effort at its launch.

In September 2025, the Boston Globe reported that Massachusetts congressman Jake Auchincloss would be the group's inaugural chairman. Auchincloss called the group's ideology "patriotic, productive populism". The group is advised by multiple Democratic communications officials, including Lis Smith and Matt Corridoni. Madison McEwans of Minnesota Reformer described it as "a group of centrists aiming to remake the party's image in the wake of Donald Trump's election". According to the same source, Majority Fund, reportedly close to Majority Democrats, donated more than $100,000 to the Minnesota 2026 Senate election candidate Angie Craig in 2025.

The New York Times described the group as "funded chiefly by" hedge fund manager Stephen Mandel and his wife Sue.

In November 2026, Majority Democrats hosted the What's Next conference in Denver, Colorado, celebrating Democratic victories in the 2026 United States elections. What's Next was considered by many to be the first major event of the 2028 Democratic Party presidential primaries, featuring speculated presidential candidates Cory Booker, Pete Buttigieg, Ruben Gallego, Ro Khanna, and Josh Shapiro. Other speakers included Hakeem Jeffries, Jamie Raskin, Rob Sand, Elissa Slotkin, James Talarico, and Chris Van Hollen.
