= Mayor Pete (film) =

2021 American documentary film

- Promotional release poster
- Directed by: Jesse Moss
- Written by: Jeff Gilbert; Amanda McBaine; Jesse Moss
- Produced by: Dan Cogan; Amanda McBaine; Jon Bardin; Laurie David; Jesse Moss
- Starring: Pete Buttigieg; Chasten Buttigieg
- Cinematography: Jesse Moss; Thorsten Thielow
- Edited by: Jeff Gilbert
- Production companies: Amazon Studios; Artemis Rising Foundation; Story Syndicate
- Distributed by: Amazon Studios
- Release dates: October 14, 2021 (CIFF); November 12, 2021
- Running time: 96 minutes
- Country: United States
- Language: English

Mayor Pete is a 2021 American documentary film directed and produced by Jesse Moss. It follows Pete Buttigieg, the mayor of South Bend, as he runs for President of the United States. It had its world premiere at the Chicago International Film Festival on October 14, 2021. It was released on November 12, 2021, on Amazon Prime Video.

== Synopsis ==
The Studebaker factory shut down in the early 1960s in South Bend. Since then the city had been in decline until Buttigieg becomes its mayor.

The film follows Pete Buttigieg as he runs for the President of the United States, campaigning to become the country's first gay president. The film begins one year before the 2020 Iowa caucuses, which Buttigieg won, marking the peak of his presidential campaign.

In April 2019, Buttigieg holds a press conference with Al Sharpton at the Sylvia's Restaurant of Harlem. Sharpton says, "We have to deal with homophobia in all communities, including the black community, including the faith community."

In July 2019, Rachel Maddow asked Buttigieg, "The police force in South Bend is now 6% black in a city that is 26% black,” Maddow noted. “Why has that not improved over your two terms as mayor?”

Buttigieg and his husband discuss LGBT parenting. He also meets with liberal Jewish and Christian leaders that he terms "religious left". They discuss using "faith...as a weapon."

Buttigieg became the first openly gay candidate to take part in a U.S. presidential debate and win a primary; he wins the 2020 Iowa Democratic presidential caucuses. He is, nonetheless, forced to exit the race after Joe Biden's landslide victory at the 2020 South Carolina Democratic presidential primary.

In 2021, Buttigieg becomes the first confirmed gay cabinet member in U.S. history, when he became Secretary of Transportation. It also gives a glimpse into the realities of life on the campaign trail. In the film, Buttigieg also reflects on his coming out story, and it offers an intimate look into his marriage.

== Cast ==
- Pete Buttigieg
- Chasten Buttigieg
- Lis Smith
- Mike Schmuhl, 2020 campaign manager
- Al Sharpton

== Production ==
In July 2019, it was announced Pete Buttigieg would appear in a documentary film, with principal photography underway, with Liz Garbus and Dan Cogan set to produce under their Story Syndicate banner. In November 2020, it was announced Jesse Moss had directed the film.

== Release and reception ==
In February 2021, Amazon Studios acquired distribution rights to the film. It had its world premiere at the Chicago International Film Festival on October 14, 2021. It also screened as the opening night film at NewFest on October 15, 2021, and at the Heartland International Film Festival on October 17, 2021. It was released on Prime Video on November 12, 2021.

=== Critical response ===
On Rotten Tomatoes, the film has an approval rating of 71% based on 49 reviews, with the critics consensus, "Mayor Pete may not pull back the curtain on its subject's deepest inner self, but it remains a compelling portrait of a candidate on the campaign trail." David Rooney, writing for The Hollywood Reporter, said that "[the] sense of a political future in large part yet to be written places a slight limitation on Buttigieg as a documentary subject, as does his generally subdued manner", adding that "it perhaps would have been useful to include a taste of his dynamic post-campaign appearances on Fox News, eviscerating obtuse GOP mouthpieces without ever raising his voice or losing his cool", and concluded that "it does have the benefit of showing a man who seems destined to remain a force in American politics, growing into the role in real time." Elizabeth Weitzman of TheWrap called the film "a doggedly traditional behind-the-scenes glimpse at a solemnly earnest political candidate," adding that it is "an enjoyable ride with intermittently compelling moments." David Ehrlich of IndieWire wrote that the film "is at its most absorbing during the rare moments when it hones in on what Buttigieg's accomplishment required of him, and what it might possibly mean for others like him."

At the 2021 Critics' Choice Documentary Awards, the film was nominated for Best Political Documentary, and Buttigieg was nominated for Most Compelling Living Subject of a Documentary.
