= Prince Shembo =

American football player (born 1991)

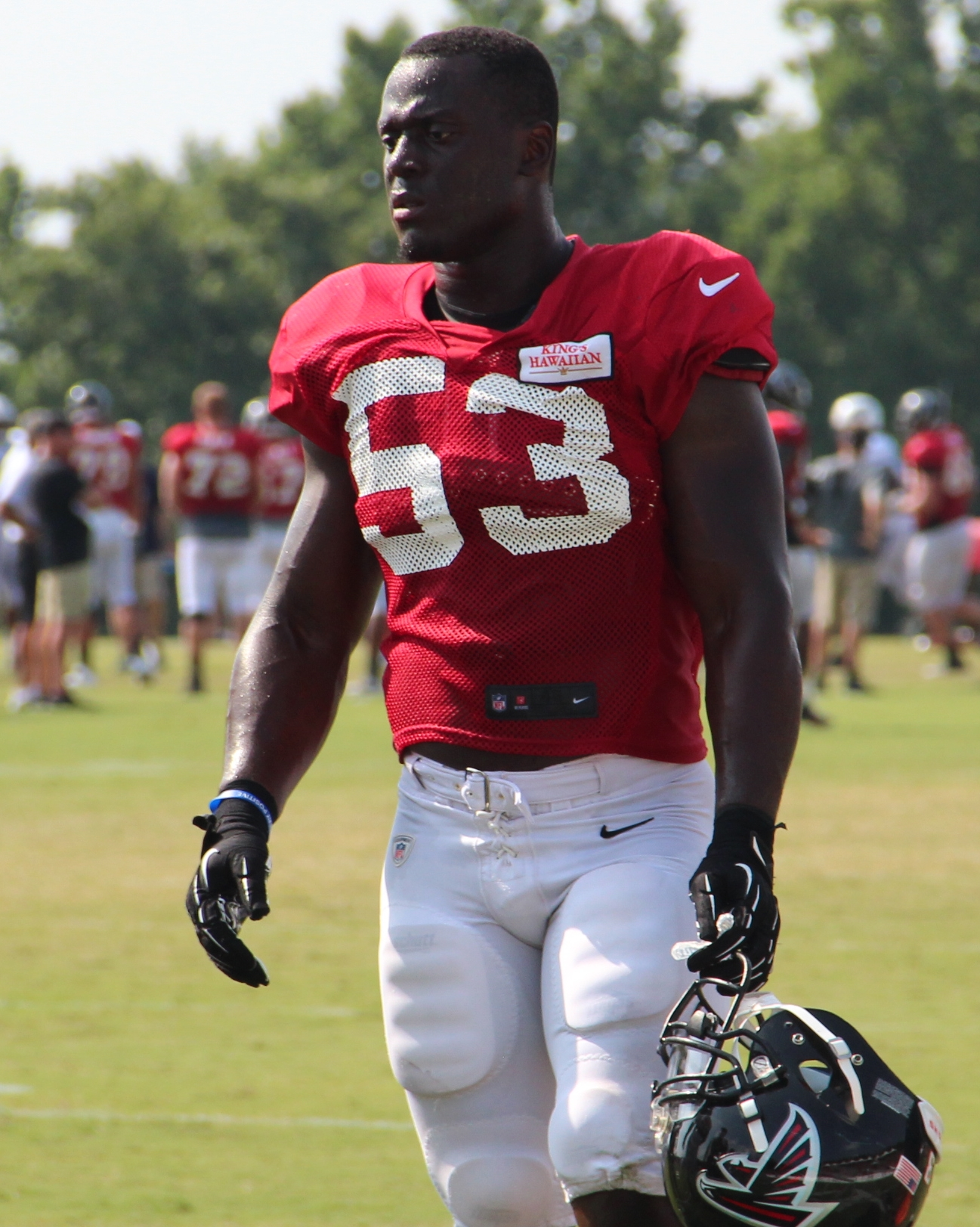
- Shembo with the Atlanta Falcons in 2014

No. 53
- Position: Linebacker

Personal information
- Born: December 24, 1991 (age 34); Greensboro, North Carolina, U.S.
- Listed height: 6 ft 1 in (1.85 m)
- Listed weight: 253 lb (115 kg)

Career information
- High school: Ardrey Kell (Charlotte, North Carolina)
- College: Notre Dame
- NFL draft: 2014: 4th round, 139th overall pick

Career history
- Atlanta Falcons (2014)

Career NFL statistics
- Total tackles: 53
- Stats at Pro Football Reference

Prince Shembo (born December 24, 1991) is an American former professional football player who was a linebacker for the Atlanta Falcons of the National Football League (NFL). He played college football for the Notre Dame Fighting Irish and was selected by the Falcons in the fourth round of the 2014 NFL draft.

== Early life ==
Prince attended Ardrey Kell High School in Charlotte, North Carolina. He played in only five games during the senior campaign. He suffered a high ankle sprain in the preseason and then was suspended from school on September 16, 2009, for an aggressive incident directed at a teacher. He recorded 86 tackles with nine sacks and added two interceptions, two forced fumbles and two fumble recoveries as a junior in 2008, and made 117 tackles during sophomore season in 2007 and was named to 2007 all-Observer team by the Charlotte Observer.

Considered a four-star recruit by Rivals.com, he was rated as the 7th best inside linebacker in the nation. He accepted a scholarship offer from Notre Dame over offers from Miami, Duke, and North Carolina.

== College career ==
As a true freshman, he saw action in all 13 games in 2010. He was one of six freshmen to make their Irish debut against Purdue, and one of three freshmen to play in every game. He registered 15 tackles on the year, including six solo stops and nine assisted tackles, and had five tackles for loss and four and a half sacks. In 2011, he appeared in 12 games for the Irish, while starting eight contests. He totaled 31 tackles, including three and a half for loss, and also had a pair of sacks. In his junior season in 2012, Shembo set career highs in tackles (51), tackles for loss (10.5), sacks (7.5) and quarterback hurries (12), and earned first-team all-independent honours. As a senior, he started all 13 games, totaling 46 tackles, including 5.5 for loss, 5.5 sacks and 17 quarterback hurries.

== Professional career ==
Shembo was selected by the Atlanta Falcons in the fourth round (139th overall) of the 2014 NFL draft. He signed with the Falcons on May 18, 2014.

The Falcons waived Shembo on May 29, 2015, after he was arrested for aggravated cruelty to animals after allegedly killing his girlfriend's dog. Shembo's attorney says Shembo accidentally killed the Yorkshire Terrier his girlfriend owned when he kicked it after it had bitten him. Shembo pleaded guilty to misdemeanor animal cruelty in August 2015 and was sentenced to a year's probation and a $1,000 fine.

The NFL suspended Shembo for two games.

In September 2016, Shembo's agent sent a letter to twelve NFL teams in which Shembo admitted mistakes and asked for another NFL opportunity.

== Personal life ==
His father, Maurice Shembo, immigrated to the United States from the Democratic Republic of the Congo in 1986. His sister, Christelle Shembo, was a forward for the Wake Forest University women's basketball team.

== Controversies ==
=== High school suspension ===
In 2009, his senior year of high school, Shembo was suspended for throwing a desk at a teacher who had taken away his cell phone.

=== Sexual battery accusation and death of Lizzy Seeberg ===
During the 2014 NFL Scouting Combine, Shembo admitted that as a Notre Dame student in 2010 he was accused of sexually assaulting Lizzy Seeberg. Seeberg, was a freshman student at nearby Saint Mary's College who later died by suicide. Shembo claimed that he is innocent of the accusation. Seeberg's father responded in a statement citing that Notre Dame was negligent in their investigation into Seeberg's case. He attributed this negligence to their fear of outing Shembo, as Shembo was part of the Notre Dame football team, an institution that has immense presence, power, and prestige within the surrounding community. This case was discussed in the 2015 documentary, The Hunting Grounds.
