= Death of Lizzy Seeberg =

American student who died by suicide

Elizabeth Seeberg (c. 1991 – September 10, 2010) was an American student who died by suicide on September 10, 2010.

== Background ==
At the time of her death, Seeberg was a 19-year-old freshman at Saint Mary's College, located across the street from University of Notre Dame. Thirteen members of the Seeberg family have attended either Notre Dame or Saint Mary's.

== Sexual assault accusation ==
On September 6, 2010, Seeberg reported to university police that she had been sexual assaulted by a Notre Dame football player on the night of August 31. In her statement to police, Seeberg said "I didn't feel safe in his room....he proceeded to grab my face and started to kiss me. Tears started rolling down my face because I didn't know what to do...I felt so scared, I couldn't move." Seeberg's death or accusations were not publicly known until the story was broken by the Chicago Tribune.

== Investigation ==
After filing the report to the police, Seeberg received several frightening texts from a friend of the accused, including "Don't do anything you would regret, messing with Notre Dame football is a bad idea."

At the time of Seeberg's death, investigators had not interviewed the accused; the player was first interviewed 15 days after Seeberg made the complaint. The university issued a statement saying "we have great sympathy for a grieving family that may believe our investigation was insufficient, but we also respectfully and wholeheartedly disagree with that contention."

However, the university had investigated Lizzy herself, including speaking with a former roommate at another school that she had previously had some disagreement with.

Prosecutors did not file criminal charges due to Lizzy not being alive to testify and also because of what they described as inconsistencies in witness accounts and cellphone records. The school determined that Lizzy lied because she said the player stopped attacking her after receiving a call or a text, but phone records showed that it was the accused who called his friend. An expert from the police department told The Washington Post that victims often get some details mixed up because of the way the brain processes information in traumatic situations.

At a closed door hearing held after the story made headlines in the national media, the accused football player was found "not responsible" and was not suspended from the team.

== Death ==
Seeberg died by suicide September 10, days after reporting the alleged incident to the campus police.

== Alleged perpetrator ==
In February 2014, during the NFL Scouting Combine, Prince Shembo admitted that as a Notre Dame student in 2010, he was accused of sexual battery against Seeberg and said that he is innocent of the accusation. Seeberg's father responded that Notre Dame was negligent in investigating Seeberg's accusation because they were protecting Shembo.

== See also ==
- Vanderbilt rape case
