= Dale DeVon =

American politician from Indiana

Dale Devon

Member of the Indiana House of Representatives from the 5th district
- Incumbent
- Assumed office November 20, 2012
- Preceded by: Craig R. Fry

Personal details
- Born: July 25, 1958 (age 67)
- Party: Republican
- Spouse: Christine
- Children: 3

Dale DeVon (born July 25, 1958) is an American politician who is the Republican member of the Indiana House of Representatives representing District 5. He was first elected in 2012. He was elected to the St. Joseph County Council for District C in 2002. He served on the County Council until his election to the State House in 2012.

DeVon and his wife Christine are the parents of three children. He is also the National Director of the Home Builders Association.
