= Pete Buttigieg 2020 presidential campaign =

American political campaign

Pete for America
- Campaign: 2020 United States presidential election (Democratic primaries)
- Candidate: Pete Buttigieg; Mayor of South Bend, Indiana (2012–2020)
- Affiliation: Democratic Party
- EC formed: January 23, 2019
- Announced: April 14, 2019
- Suspended: March 1, 2020
- Headquarters: South Bend, Indiana
- Key people: Mike Schmuhl; (campaign manager); Lis Smith; (senior advisor and spokesperson)
- Receipts: US$76,778,634.72 (December 31, 2019)
- Slogan: Win The Era

The 2020 presidential campaign of Pete Buttigieg was an election campaign by the former mayor of South Bend, Indiana. It was formally announced on April 14, 2019, in South Bend. Buttigieg was the first openly gay candidate to seek the Democratic nomination for president. At 38, he was the youngest candidate in the 2020 primary race. Although considered a lower-tier candidate at launch, his campaign later gained prominence, winning the most delegates in the Iowa caucuses and tying with Bernie Sanders for the most delegates in the New Hampshire primary.

Buttigieg's major political positions included abolition of the United States Electoral College, support for a public health insurance option with an individual mandate, labor unions, universal background checks for gun purchases, protecting the environment by addressing climate change, a pathway to citizenship for undocumented immigrants, overturning the Citizens United ruling, and a federal law prohibiting discrimination against LGBTQ people.

After placing fourth in the South Carolina primary—and not seeing a path to gain the DNC nomination—Buttigieg dropped out of the race on March 1, 2020, having earned 26 delegates and almost 17% of the popular vote. On March 2, Buttigieg endorsed Joe Biden for president.

== Campaign ==
=== Exploratory committee ===
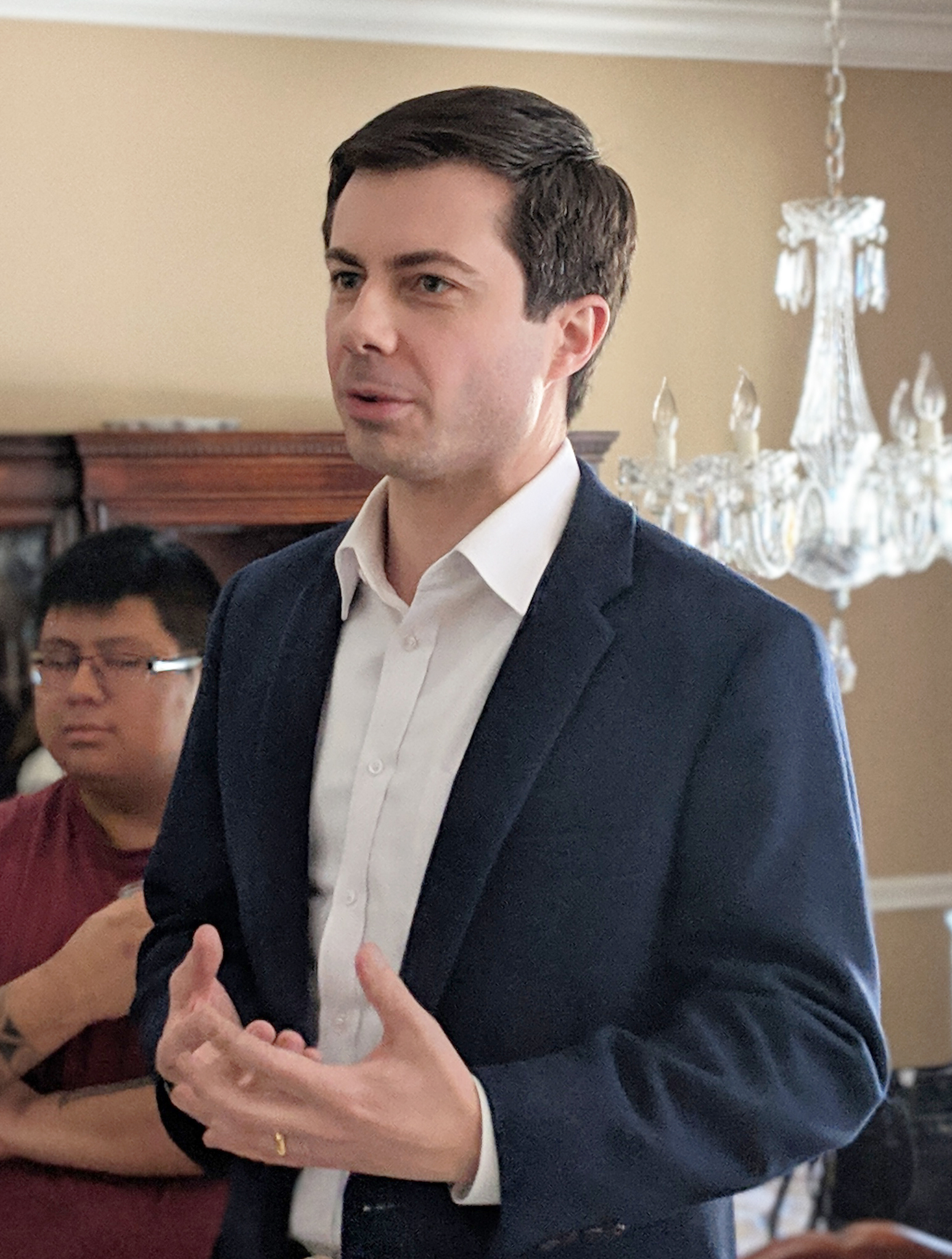
Buttigieg campaigning in New Hampshire, February 2019

Buttigieg had attracted some speculation as being a potential presidential candidate, especially following his visit to the early caucus state of Iowa in December 2018, where he announced that he would not seek reelection as mayor of South Bend. On January 23, 2019, he announced the formation of an exploratory committee to run for President of the United States in the 2020 Democratic Party presidential primaries.

On March 10, 2019, Buttigieg participated a town hall meeting at South by Southwest in Austin, Texas. The town hall was hosted and broadcast by CNN. It was one in a series of three town halls with presidential candidates that CNN aired back-to-back that evening (town halls with Tulsi Gabbard and John Delaney aired immediately before Buttigieg's). Buttigieg's performance in his town hall attracted significant attention, particularly his remarks on former Indiana governor and incumbent Republican vice president Mike Pence. Buttigieg had known Pence during their overlapping years in Indiana politics. He argued that Pence had interpreted Christian scripture in a vastly different way than he himself did when it comes to homosexuality, and derided Pence as having become, "the cheerleader for the porn star presidency," (an evident reference to the Stormy Daniels–Donald Trump scandal, which connected Trump with a pornographic actress). Within the twenty-four hours after the town hall, Buttigieg raised more than $600,000 from 22,000 unique donors. He quickly followed-up his heralded town hall with a series of well-received news media interviews. The attention garnered from the town hall and subsequent interviews helped him stand out from the Democratic field's other lesser-known candidates, and gave him early advantage in fundraising advantage over those candidates. Soon after, CNN's Chris Cillizza called Buttigieg, "the hottest candidate in the 2020 race". On March 16, 2019, Buttigieg's campaign surpassed the 65,000 unique donor threshold to qualify for the first presidential primary debates.

=== Campaign announcement ===
On April 14, 2019, Buttigieg's campaign was formally launched from South Bend, Indiana.

=== Fundraising ===
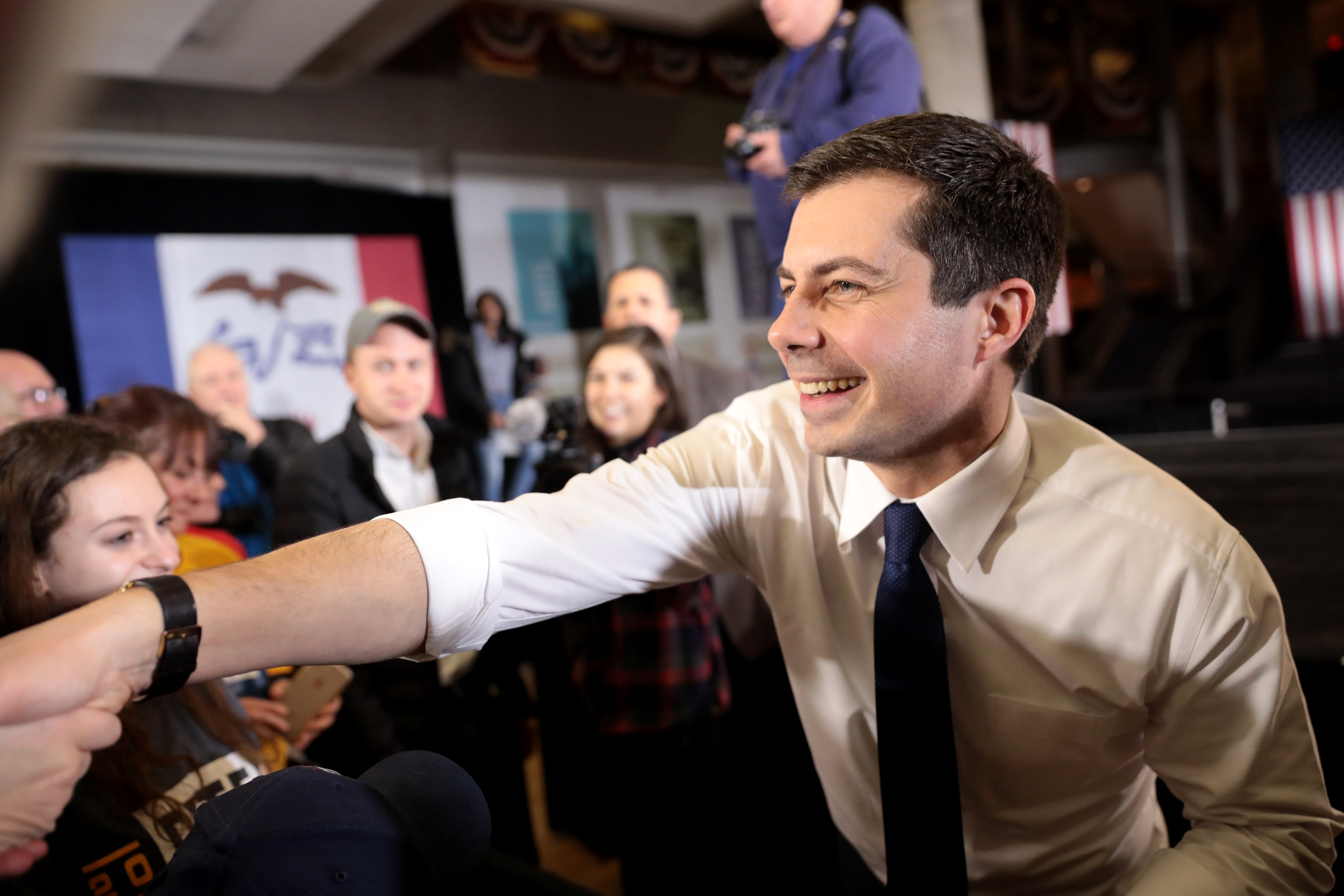
Buttigieg greeting supporters at a campaign rally in Des Moines, Iowa

By the end of the first quarter of 2019, the campaign had raised more than $7 million.

Democratic donor Susie Tompkins Buell sent invitations to a Buttigieg fundraiser scheduled for April 11, 2019; it sought contributions ranging from $250 to $2,800. Buell has also backed U.S. senator Kamala Harris in the 2020 race. Within four hours of Buttigieg's campaign launch, it raised over $1 million.

On April 26, 2019, Pete Buttigieg announced that his campaign would no longer accept donations from registered lobbyists; and it then returned $30,250 in donations of this kind.

Pete Buttigieg's campaign raised over $24.8 million in the second quarter of 2019, second to only Bernie Sanders in that quarter, and an amount that included funds from 230,000 new donors. Buttigieg has $22.6 million cash on hand, according to the campaign, with a total of 400,000 donors.

=== Polls ===
A poll conducted by Emerson Polling between March 21 and 24, 2019, in the early battleground state of Iowa found Buttigieg in third place behind Joe Biden and Bernie Sanders, but ahead of other candidates such as Kamala Harris, Elizabeth Warren, and Beto O'Rourke. A St. Anselm College poll conducted between April 3 and 8 in New Hampshire also placed Buttigieg in third.

In June, a YouGov poll showed Buttigieg in fifth place nationwide by number of people considering voting for him. Polls in August and September showed he had low support among African-Americans. By mid-November, he had emerged as a potential frontrunner in Iowa polls.

=== African American support ===
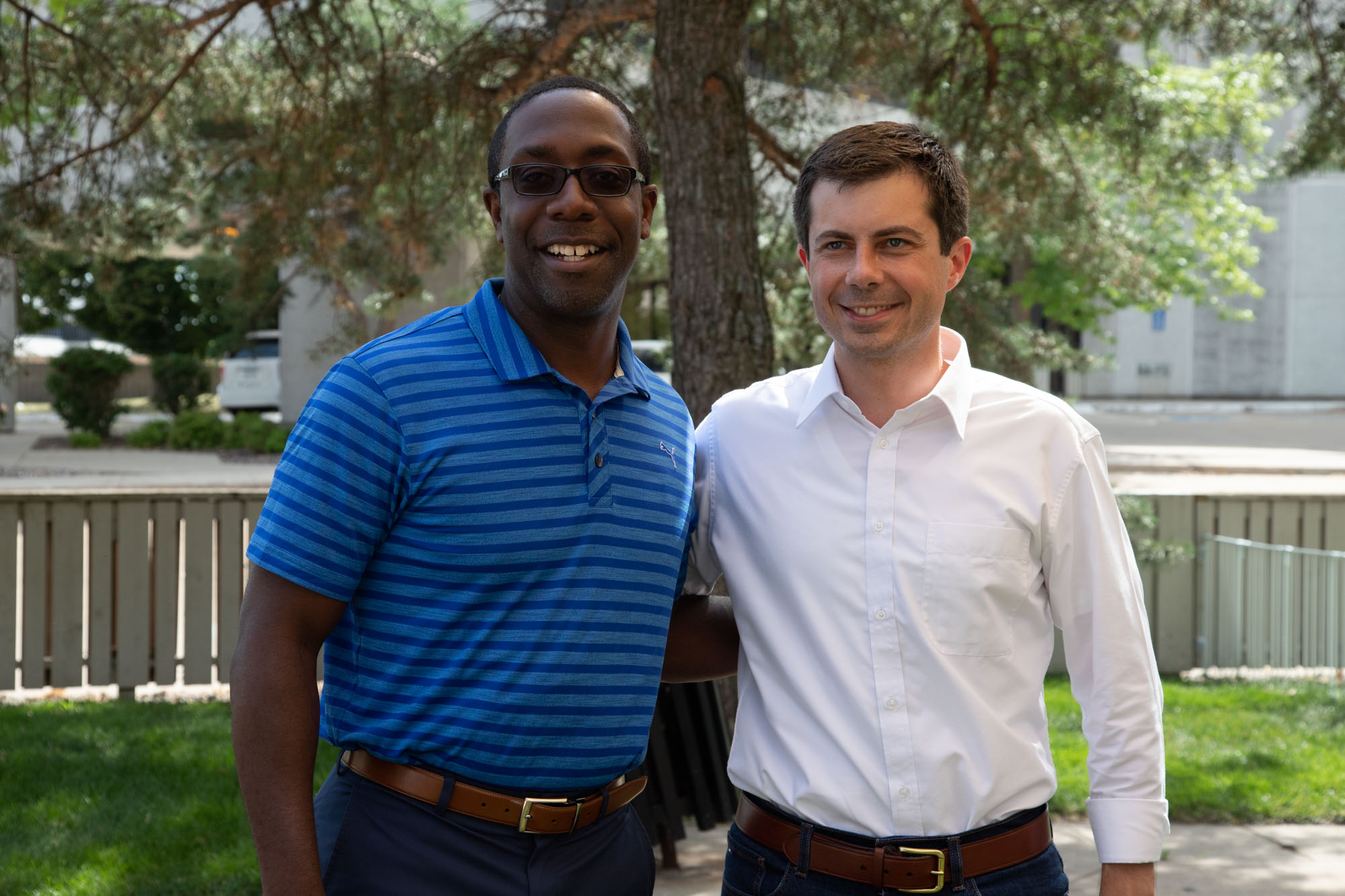
Mayors Quentin Hart (left) and Pete Buttigieg (right) together in 2019.

Criticism of Buttigieg's handling of racial issues in South Bend led to doubts about his ability to attract black voters. Following the controversial shooting of Eric Logan, an African American man, by a white South Bend police officer in June 2019, Buttigieg put his campaign on hold to focus on the emerging public reaction. Buttigieg convened a local town hall on June 23, where he heard the grievances of disaffected activists in the African American community as well as relatives of Eric Logan. After the shooting, Buttigieg came under criticism for his management of the South Bend police department. This included scrutiny towards the departure of half the African-American officers in the South Bend Police Department under Mayor Buttigieg, and the attrition of other African-American employees from that department. The incident was seen by some as a test of Buttigieg's ability to weather the rigours of the presidency.

Buttigieg's campaign touted his record in reducing the African-American poverty rate in South Bend. It also pointed to Buttigieg administration initiatives such as the creation in 2016 of the first Officer for Diversity and Inclusion for the City of South Bend. His campaign sustained questions about the low level of city contracting with minority owned businesses and hiring of persons of color during Buttigieg's tenure as mayor.

=== Campaign slogans ===
The popular slogan of the Pete Buttigieg 2020 Campaign was "Win The Era" and the message of generational change. Another frequently used phrase by Buttigieg was "future former Republicans". He used his faith as a platform to say that “God does not belong to a political party.”

=== Campaign finance violation complaint ===
In February 2020, a campaign finance watchdog group filed a Federal Election Commission (FEC) complaint alleging that the Buttigieg campaign coordinated with a Super PAC. The complaint alleged that a tweet from a Buttigieg campaign was an attempt to bypass the FEC Act, which prohibits campaigns from coordinating with outside groups. Huffington Post noted it is in the fuzzy area of social media where there is an exception: “if the information material to the creation, production, or distribution of the communication was obtained from a publicly available source”.

=== Campaign suspension ===
After a poor showing in the South Carolina primary, Buttigieg suspended his campaign on March 1, 2020. LGBTQ people showed support for the effort with a #ThankYouPete campaign on social media.

According to the New York Times, former President Barack Obama called Buttigieg before the Super Tuesday primaries to tell him "that he would never have more leverage than on the day that he was quitting the race — and the former South Bend mayor soon joined the avalanche of former candidates backing Mr. Biden."

== Democratic primary debates ==
The Democratic National Committee has scheduled a series of twelve primary debates, six each in 2019 and 2020.

=== First debate ===
The first debate was held June 26 and 27 in Miami, Florida. Due to the large number of candidates participating, twenty who qualified, the first two debates were divided into two nights, each with ten candidates; Buttigieg was placed in the latter group of candidates. On June 27, Buttigieg took part in the first 2020 Democratic Party presidential debate. He thus became the first openly gay presidential candidate to appear in a nationally televised presidential debate in the United States.

=== Second, third, and fourth debates ===
The second debate was held July 30 and 31 in Detroit. Buttigieg participated on the first night July 30. The third debate took place September 12 in Houston, Texas. Only ten candidates qualified, so it took place over the course of only one night. The fourth debate took place October 15 in Westerville, Ohio and was hosted by CNN and the New York Times.

=== Fifth debate ===
Buttigieg participated in the fifth debate along with nine other candidates, which took place on November 20 in Atlanta, Georgia. Instead of polling mid-pack, he was leading in Iowa, the first state primary, and was in the top tier in New Hampshire, the second. Buttigieg iterated his mayoral and military experience, stating "I know that from the perspective of Washington, what goes on in my city might look small, but frankly, where we live, the infighting on Capitol Hill is what looks small."

=== Sixth debate ===
Buttigieg was one of six candidates that met the polling percentages and fundraising quotas for the sixth debate held December 19 in Los Angeles. The overall field of candidates has remained around twenty with some candidates dropping out, while others have entered or declared an interest to run.

=== Ninth debate ===
Buttigieg received mixed responses from the media following his debate performance, which focused mainly on dissecting Bernie Sanders viewpoints with much critique, in hopes to winning over supporters of the front runner with an alternative choice. Sanders responded by aiming at Buttigieg's campaign contributor list, consisting of billionaires. Buttigieg also tried to discredit his moderate competition in Amy Klobuchar, specifically highlighting the fact she forgot the name of the President of Mexico, Andrés Manuel López Obrador. Buttigieg notably criticized Michael Bloomberg and Bernie Sanders, stating "We shouldn't have to choose between one candidate who wants to burn this party down and another candidate who wants to buy this party out. We can do better." According to a Newsweek article, (who cited Statista), Pete Buttigieg had the 4th longest talking time, clocking in at 14 minutes 52 seconds during the debate.

== Political positions ==
Buttigieg ran in the mainstream or moderate wing in the primary along with former Vice President Joe Biden and Senator Kamala Harris. Buttigieg and fellow moderates often criticized Senator Bernie Sanders and former Mayor Michael Bloomberg during the primary debates.

=== Abortion ===
Buttigieg is pro-choice; as such, he supports repealing the Hyde Amendment, which blocks federal funding for abortion services in all but the most extreme circumstances. In 2018, as mayor, Buttigieg vetoed a South Bend Common Council rezoning decision that would have allowed an anti-abortion center to open next door to the abortion clinic, Whole Women's Health Alliance. The Women's Care Center eventually found an alternative location in South Bend. Even though the South Bend Common Council supported the rezoning exception, Buttigieg said, "I don’t think it would be responsible to situate two groups literally right next to each other ... that have diametrically opposed views on the most divisive social issue of our time." He also expressed his concern that such a close proximity between their buildings would simply conduce to the harassment of the one side by the other.

In May 2019, after the Alabama Legislature outlawed virtually all abortion services in the state by passing the Human Life Protection Act, Buttigieg said that it was "ignoring science, criminalizing abortion, and punishing women."

=== Climate change ===
Buttigieg released a plan to combat climate change that rests on the following three pillars: building a clean economy through the creation of clean energy jobs; improving resilience by investing in disaster relief and prevention; and building the United States' role on the international stage in the urgent fight against climate change. Further, his proposal sets the aggressive benchmarks of doubling clean electricity in the U.S. by 2025, zero emissions in electricity generation by 2035, net-zero emissions from industrial vehicles by 2040, and a net-zero emissions by 2050.

Buttigieg said that he would restore the United States' commitment to the Paris Climate Agreement and double its pledge to the Green Climate Fund. He also said that the government should start subsidizing solar panels to reduce emissions. Buttigieg approves of the Green New Deal proposed by House Democrats. He also supports a carbon tax and dividend policy for reducing greenhouse gas emissions.

=== Criminal justice ===
Buttigieg supports the abolition of the death penalty. He has also called for restoring voting rights to former felons and moving toward reversing criminal sentences for minor drug-related offenses. He supports the "safe, regulated, and legal sale of marijuana."

In 2019, Buttigieg professed himself "troubled" by former President Obama's decision to commute the sentence of Chelsea Manning, the Iraq War whistleblower, days before leaving office in 2017; Buttigieg also gave a mixed evaluation of Edward Snowden's disclosure of classified information, saying that "we've learned things about abuses and that one way or another that needed to come out" but that "the way for that to come out is through Congressional oversight, not through a breach of classified information."

In August 2019, Buttigieg released a plan to decriminalize drug addiction and mental illness, favoring diversionary programs over incarceration.

=== Economy and commerce ===
Buttigieg has frequently pointed to automation as the chief cause of the great loss of manufacturing jobs nationwide. Buttigieg has spent time talking with labor workers and has emphasized the need for democratic leaders to be in contact with labor unions. As a self-proclaimed democratic capitalist, Buttigieg supports a constitutional amendment to protect democracy from the undue and corruptive influence of money in politics. He is receptive to the possibility of antitrust actions against large technology companies but more focused on privacy and data security concerns.

=== Elections ===
Buttigieg favors the abolition of the Electoral College. He is on record saying that he supports reinstating convicted felons' right to vote once they are released, but not before.

=== Foreign policy ===
Buttigieg has said that he believes the post-9/11 invasion of Afghanistan was justified, but now supports withdrawing American troops from the region while maintaining an intelligence presence. Buttigieg is a committed supporter of Israel. However, he notably disapproves of former Israeli prime minister Benjamin Netanyahu's zeal for annexing Jewish settlements in the Israeli-occupied West Bank.

In January 2019, following Juan Guaidó's self-declaration as interim president of Venezuela, Buttigieg told HuffPost that as a supporter of free and fair elections, he is amenable to potential sanctions but not a military intervention imposed on the country. On June 11, 2019, Buttigieg said: "We will remain open to working with a regime like the Kingdom of Saudi Arabia for the benefit of the American people. But we can no longer sell out our deepest values for the sake of fossil fuel access and lucrative business deals."

=== Health care ===
At the start of his campaign, Buttigieg advocated for a single-payer healthcare system. Buttigieg later promoted "Medicare for All Who Want It", a plan that would implement a public option for Medicare, while allowing private health insurance for anyone who wanted to purchase it.

In August 2019, Buttigieg released a $300 billion plan to expand mental health care services and fight addiction.

=== Immigration ===
Buttigieg supports Deferred Action for Childhood Arrivals (DACA) and has rebuked the Trump administration's deportation policies. He defended a resident of Granger, Indiana, who was deported after living in the U.S. for 17 years despite having regularly checked in with ICE and applied for a green card.

Buttigieg has said that Trump has been reckless in sending American troops to the southern border, and that it is a measure of last resort.

=== Judicial issues ===
Buttigieg has said that he believes the Supreme Court needs structural reform, emphasizing depoliticization and suggesting that the court be expanded to 15 members, five of whom can only be seated by unanimous consensus of the other ten.

=== Racial equality ===
In May 2019, Buttigieg warned that President Donald Trump and his administration were using white identity politics, which he identified as the most divisive form of identity politics. In July 2019 Buttigieg shared his Douglass Plan, named for abolitionist Frederick Douglass, to address systemic racism in America. Announcing it at a Chicago meeting of Jesse Jackson’s Rainbow/PUSH civil rights organization, Buttigieg compared the plan's scope to that of the U.S.'s Marshall Plan, which invested funds in war-torn Europe after World War II, and said it would address "opportunity for minority businesses, strengthening voting rights, and reforming the criminal justice system." The initiative allocates $10 billion to African-American entrepreneurship over five years, grants $25 billion to historically black colleges, legalizes marijuana, expunges records of drug convictions, halves the federal prison population, and passes a federal New Voting Rights Act designed to increase voting access.

The rollout of the Douglass Plan was the subject of controversy. The Intercept reported that in a press release about the plan, the campaign had listed three prominent members of the South Carolina black community, none of whom had endorsed Buttigieg and only one of whom had endorsed the plan. After criticism of the press release, the Buttigieg campaign responded that they had sent the plan to a list of supporters and asked them to opt out if they did not want to be included. The campaign also received criticism for displaying a stock photo of a woman from Kenya on their page promoting the plan, which was later removed.

=== Social issues ===
Buttigieg favors amending civil rights legislation with the Federal Equality Act so that LGBT Americans also receive federal non-discrimination protections. He opposes the ban on transgender people participating in the military that was enacted by Trump.

He also supports expanding opportunities for national service and has said that he is open to making a yearlong term of national service mandatory for those turning 18 years old. "One thing we could do ... would be to make it, if not legally obligatory, then certainly a social norm that anybody after they're 18 years old spends a year in national service", he said. In July 2019 Buttigieg announced a plan to increase participation in national service organizations like AmeriCorps and the Peace Corps, as well as creating new ones dedicated to "fighting climate change, treating mental health and addiction, and providing caregiving for older people". The initiative prioritizes volunteering in predominantly minority communities and rural areas by tripling programs to 250,000 people at first, then expanding to one million by 2026.

=== Statehood ===
Buttigieg is an advocate for the statehood of Washington, D.C., He has also indicated that he would support Puerto Rican statehood "if they want it."

=== Workers' rights ===
In July 2019, Buttigieg released a plan for "empowering workers in a changing economy", by raising the minimum wage to $15, fining employers that interfere with union elections, enforcing gender pay transparency, fighting workplace harassment and discrimination against women, and by offering sick leave and paid family leave nationwide.

== Caucuses and primaries ==
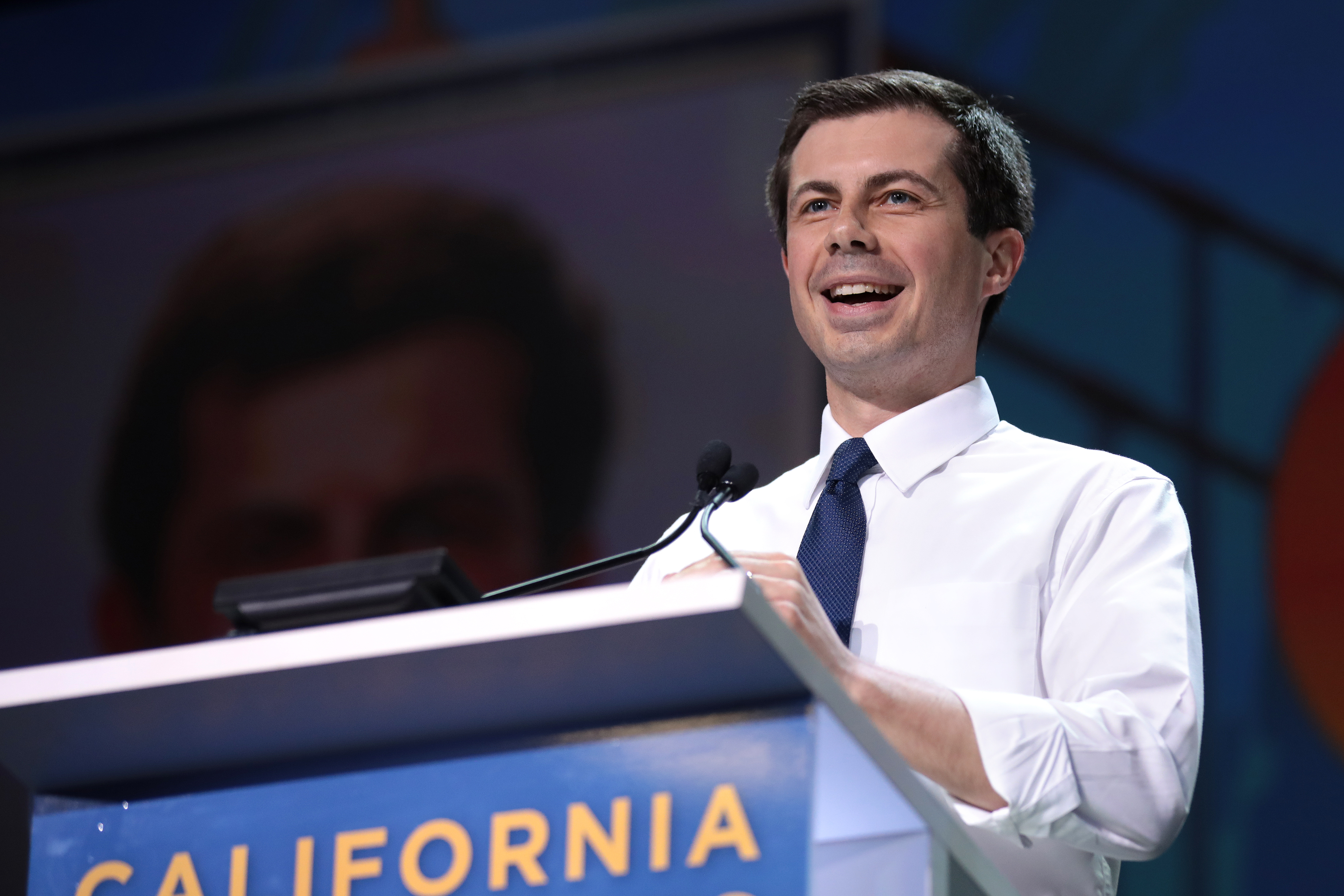
Buttigieg at the 2019 California Democratic Party State Convention

=== Early states (February) ===
In early February 2020, Buttigieg led the Iowa caucus results, the first state to have elections—with 41 Democratic delegates available, with a narrow lead of 26.2% to Bernie Sanders’ 26.1%, winning fourteen delegates to Sanders’ twelve; the results came after a recount in 95 counties where irregularities were reported, a recanvass request was expected. The LGBTQ Victory Fund, Buttigieg's first national endorsement, (Note: He was endorsed in June 2019 on the 50th anniversary of the Stonewall Uprising.) noted the historical first of an LGBTQ candidate winning a presidential state election.

In the New Hampshire primary (February 11)—with 24 delegates available—the first in the nation, Buttigieg got 24.4% of votes trailing Sanders’ 25.7% earning each nine delegates; in third was Amy Klobuchar with 19.8% getting six delegates.

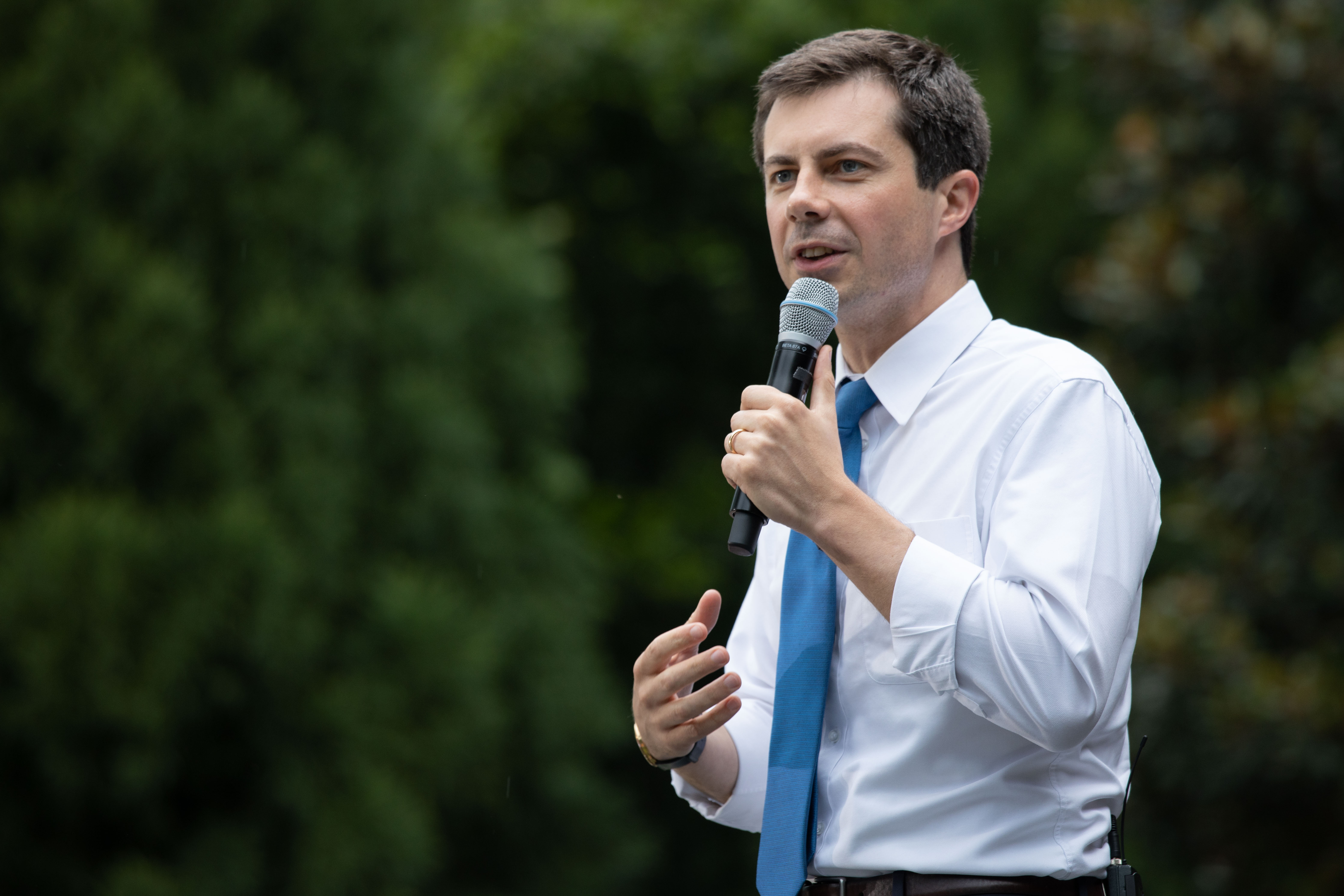
Buttigieg speaks to supporters at a rally in North Augusta, South Carolina.

The Nevada caucuses, held February 22, have thirty-six delegates available; Sanders (46.8%) getting 24 delegates, Joe Biden (20.2%), with nine delegates, and Buttigieg (14.3%) getting three.

The South Carolina primary (February 29) has fifty-four delegates; Biden won (48.4%), Sanders (19.9%), then Tom Steyer (11.3%), and Buttigieg (8.2%). Steyer had staked his personal fortune on the effort and tied it to winning the state; he has dropped out of the race. As of February 29, Buttigieg has 26 delegates, and almost 17% of the popular vote.

== LGBTQ representation ==
The Daily Beast notes Buttigieg's campaign as a "trailblazer" for LGBTQ representation in politics and society. He addressed his being gay candidly "in a way no other public figure has done". Buttigieg also rebuffed “attacks from homophobic bigots” by invoking his Christian faith. He discussed his marriage at campaign events, and publicly showed affection to his husband. According to The Daily Beast his "candidacy has shown young people anxious about coming out that being gay is no longer a barrier to full participation in our society".
