= Lis Smith =

American political consultant (born 1982)

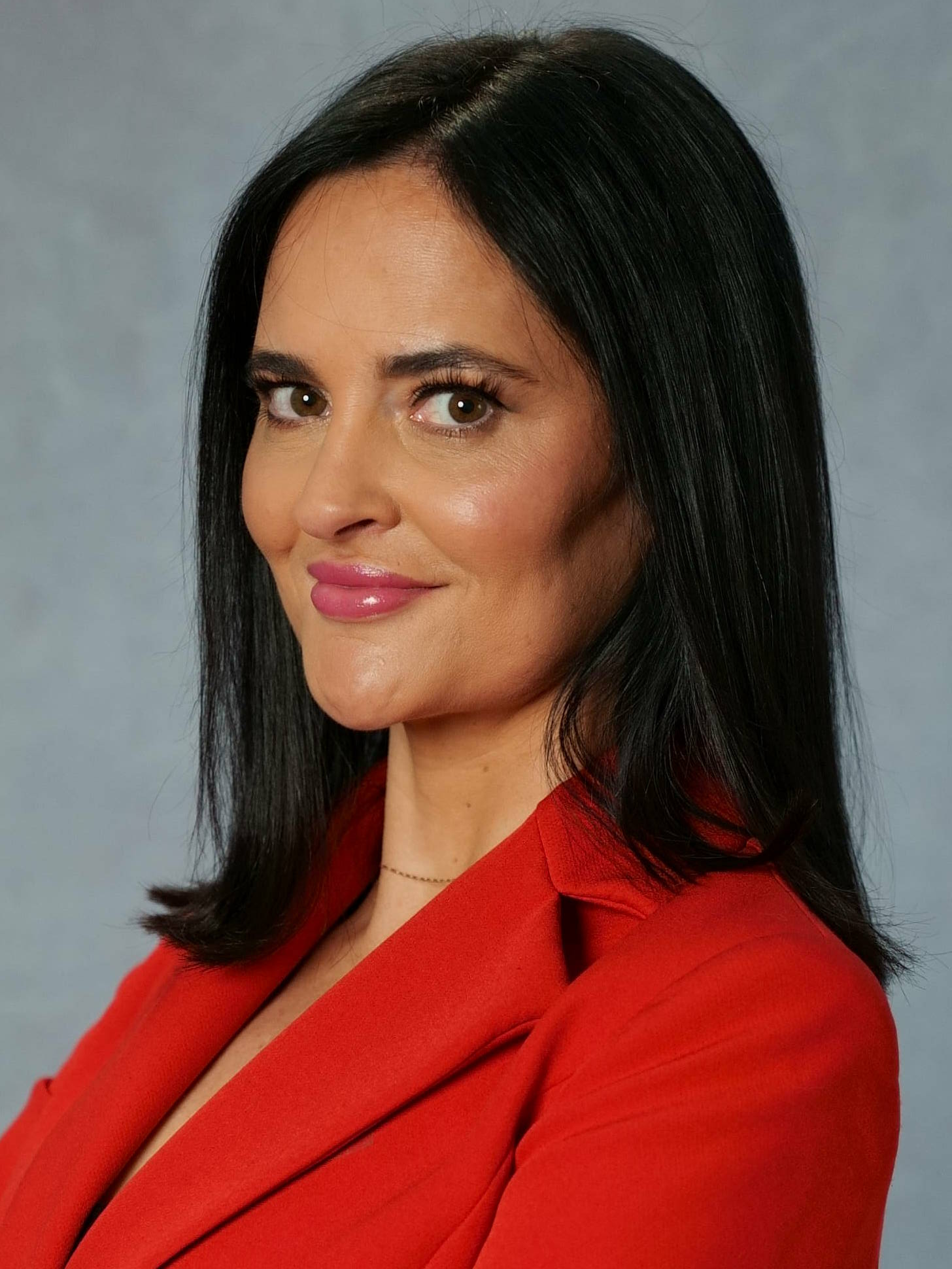

Personal details
- Born: October 15, 1982 (age 44) Bronxville, New York, U.S.
- Party: Democratic
- Education: Dartmouth College (BA)
- Occupation: Political strategist

Elisabeth Smith (born October 15, 1982) is an American political strategist for the Democratic Party.

She is known for being the senior advisor for Pete Buttigieg's 2020 presidential campaign, deputy manager of Martin O'Malley's 2016 presidential campaign and the director of rapid response for Barack Obama's 2012 campaign. She has also directed communications and strategy for several other gubernatorial, mayoral and congressional campaigns.

== Early life and education ==
Smith was born to lawyers Thomas, cousin of Senator Sam Ervin, and Adrienne Smith and was raised in Bronxville, New York, along with her twin brother Angus, and older siblings Ashley and Toby.

In 2001, Smith graduated from Bronxville High School. Smith double majored in government and anthropology at Dartmouth College, graduating in 2005. During her time at Dartmouth, she volunteered for John Edwards' 2004 presidential campaign.

== Career ==
=== 2000s ===
Smith worked on Tom Daschle's 2004 Senate campaign as a field organizer.

In 2006, Smith went to work on Claire McCaskill's Senate campaign in Missouri as Press Secretary. After McCaskill's win, she joined the 2007 Kentucky gubernatorial campaign of Bruce Lunsford as traveling press secretary. She was also communications director for Dan Seals' 2008 Illinois House race. In 2009, she became press secretary for Terry McAuliffe and Jon Corzine's gubernatorial races in Virginia and New Jersey.

=== 2010s ===
Smith served as communications director for Ted Strickland's 2010 Ohio governor's race. She became communications director for the Democratic Governors Association in 2011. As communications director for the DGA, she oversaw gubernatorial campaign efforts in Kentucky and West Virginia.

In 2012, she became director of the rapid response team for Barack Obama's 2012 presidential campaign. While working for the Obama campaign she met David Axelrod, whom Smith considers a mentor. In 2013, she moved back to New York and became the press secretary for Eliot Spitzer's New York City comptroller campaign, an attempted political comeback after his prostitution scandal. She later worked as the spokeswoman for Bill de Blasio's mayoral run in 2013. In 2014, she became a communication consultant for Adriano Espaillat's congressional campaign.

In 2016, she was the spokesperson for Marisol Alcantara's successful New York State Senate campaign. After winning the election, the candidate joined the Independent Democratic Conference (IDC), and Smith consulted briefly for the group. Critics of the IDC have questioned Smith's loyalty to the implementation of progressive policies and candidates. In 2018, Smith became spokeswoman for Andrew Cuomo's successful re-election campaign, who had endorsed the political entity.

She was the deputy campaign manager for the Martin O'Malley 2016 presidential campaign. After O'Malley's campaign, she advised several nonprofit organizations, and incumbent governors such as Montana governor Steve Bullock.

=== 2020 Pete Buttigieg presidential campaign ===
Smith met Pete Buttigieg on the recommendations of Axelrod and O'Malley when he was considering running for Democratic National Committee chair in 2017 and became a consultant for the campaign. She served as senior advisor for his 2020 presidential run, steering his campaign publicly by courting the national political press, a technique she further honed during Buttigieg's 2020 presidential campaign. Smith was credited with implementing a campaign strategy that emphasized one-on-one interactions between Buttigieg and the press which helped raise his profile from the mayor of the fourth-largest Indiana city to a top-tier presidential candidate. Smith's strategy also emphasized saturation in unconventional settings, such as "West Wing" fan podcasts. She later modeled a New Hampshire bus trip off of John McCain's Straight Talk Express during his 2000 presidential campaign in which reporters were invited on board to travel and question the candidate.

The Buttigieg campaign launched Smith, and her "hard-nosed New York-style," to national celebrity in the Democratic Party. Her role in the campaign was explored by the 2021 documentary film Mayor Pete. Business Insider considered her to be one of the 10 most powerful women running the 2020 presidential campaigns. She has been included in Fortune's 40 Under 40 in Government and Politics, and Crain's list of the 50 Most Powerful Women in New York.

=== 2020s ===
In 2020, Smith was one of six political experts named as fellows by the Georgetown Institute of Politics and Public Service. She was a senior advisor on Corey Johnson's 2021 campaign for New York City Comptroller, and raised $3.5 million in funds for a PAC supporting Andrew Yang's 2021 mayoral campaign.

In 2021, Smith worked closely with then-governor Andrew Cuomo, and advised him on how to respond to the sexual harassment allegations against him. A report by New York Attorney General Letitia James showed that Smith was working behind the scenes to protect Cuomo from the allegations. In 2022, Smith became a communications adviser for Michigan State Senator Mallory McMorrow.

Smith authored the 2022 book Any Given Tuesday: A Political Love Story. It was written over a period of 18 months, and covers her life and political career. The book was praised for its insight into the personal and political fortunes of politicians she advised. Philip Elliott of Time praised its transparency and wrote that it "may just rewrite the template for what a political memoir can be." Lloyd Green, writing for The Guardian, called it "breezy and informative." Some critics felt that it minimized her role in discrediting the sexual assault allegations against Cuomo.

In March 2024, the Democratic National Committee selected Smith to lead communications, opposition research and legal challenges as part of a team focused on combatting independent and third-party candidates in the 2024 presidential election. In July 2025, The New York Times reported that Smith was an advisor for Majority Democrats.

== Political commentary and analysis ==
Smith is also known for her commentary and analysis of United States politics. She has written for publications such as The New York Times, Vanity Fair and The Washington Post. She also has an active social media presence, through which she addresses political topics and factchecks statements by Republican politicians such as Mitt Romney. Time and Politico included her on their lists of the best political Twitter feeds. Smith is a critic of the progressive wing of the Democratic Party.

== Personal life ==
Smith dated Missouri politician Jeff Smith, who served as her professor at Dartmouth. She also handled some of his publicity during his political campaign. From 2013 to 2015, she had a relationship with her former boss, former New York governor Eliot Spitzer. The relationship ended her role in de Blasio's mayoral campaign after tabloids published stories about it.
