= Craig R. Fry =

American politician

Member of the Indiana House of Representatives from the 5th district
- In office 1988–2012
- Succeeded by: Dale DeVon

Personal details
- Born: October 6, 1952 (age 73)
- Party: Democratic
- Spouse: Carol
- Occupation: Executive Director of Apprenticeship Training, Ivy Tech State College

Craig Raymond Fry is a Democratic member of the Indiana House of Representatives, representing the 5th District between 1988 and 2012.
