= Hybrid PAC =

A hybrid PAC (sometimes called a Carey Committee) is a political committee classification in the United States. It is used by the Federal Election Commission to describe a committee with certain spending and contribution limitations.

The term is related to "super PAC," a committee which may not make contributions to candidate campaigns or parties, but may engage in unlimited political spending independently of the campaigns. Unlike super PACs, however, a hybrid PAC can give limited amounts of money directly to campaigns and committees, while still making independent expenditures in unlimited amounts.

The hybrid PAC is required to maintain two separate bank accounts for the two types of expenditures, and to register with the Federal Election Commission (FEC) and report all receipts and disbursements for both accounts. In essence, the hybrid PAC is the equivalent of a traditional PAC and a super PAC operating under the same roof. The first $5,000 given to a hybrid PAC is given to the traditional PAC, and any funds above that are channeled into the super PAC.

== History ==
The Hybrid PAC has its origins in the Carey v. Federal Election Commission (FEC) case, in which retired United States Navy Rear Admiral James J. Carey, Kelly Eustis, and the National Defense Political Action Committee filed suit against the FEC on January 31, 2011. Dan Backer, Carey's attorney in the case, argued that the current laws governing campaign contributions prohibited "a nonconnected political committee from soliciting and accepting unlimited contributions to one bank account designated for independent expenditures, while maintaining a second, separate bank account designated for source- and amount-limited contributions to candidates and their authorized political committees." A judge in the D.D.C. ruled in Carey's favor, which opened the door for any PAC or super PAC to reclassify themselves as a hybrid PAC.

Thirteen hybrid PACs were formed within five months of the Carey v. FEC decision. One of the nation's oldest PACs, The Business-Industry Political Action Committee, transitioned to a hybrid PAC in October 2011. Its president and CEO Greg Casey called the decision a "no-brainer," as the PAC could start operating a super PAC arm by opening a new bank account instead of creating a new organization.

As of 2024, Americans for Prosperity, a twenty year old Hybrid PAC, has spent "$257 million (US) to support conservative congressional and presidential candidates."

In total, $1,376 million was spent by hybrid PACs in the 2024 election. The largest spender was for the 2024 US presidential election, in which Kamala Harris was supported by Future Forward USA PAC, a hybrid PAC that spent $517 million.
