= 2026 Indiana House of Representatives election =

- November 3, 2026

All 100 seats in the Indiana House of Representatives 51 seats needed for a majority
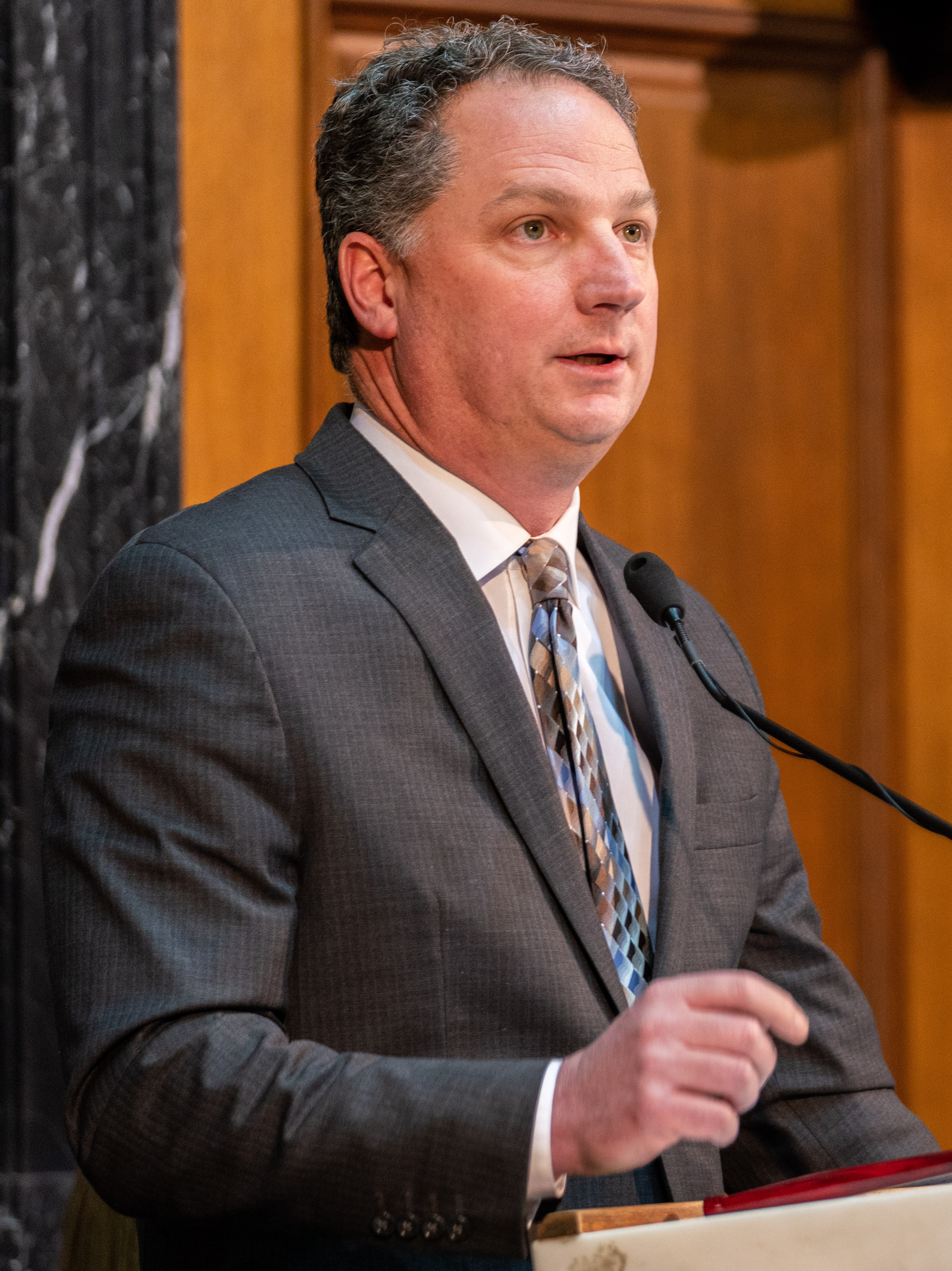

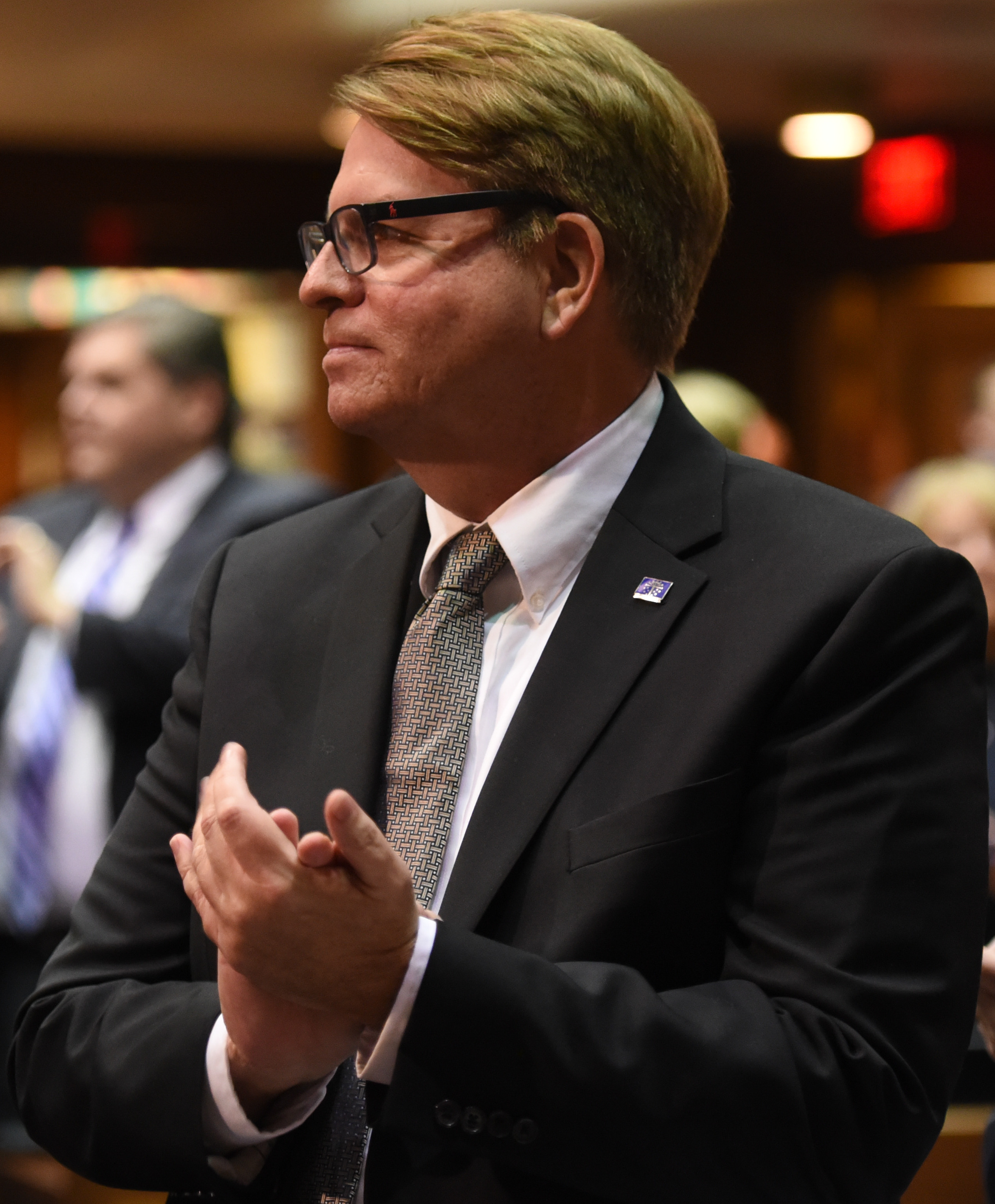
	Majority party	Minority party
Leader	Todd Huston (lost re-election)	Phil GiaQuinta
Party	Republican	Democratic
Leader's seat	37th-Fishers	80th-Fort Wayne
Last election	70	30
Seats before	69	30
Seats won	54	46
Seat change	▼15	▲16
Popular vote	875,967	977,008
Percentage	47.27%	52.73%
Swing	▼16.40%	▲16.93%
	Third party
Party	Independent
Last election	0 seats
Seats before	1 (Note: Edward Clere, who was re-elected as a Republican in 2024, is an independent who left the party and is retiring to run for mayor of New Albany. He is no longer included in the number of seats held by Republicans.)
Seats won	0
Seat change	▼1
- Democratic gain Republican hold Democratic hold
Speaker before election
Todd Huston
Republican
Elected Speaker
Ben Smaltz
Republican

The 2026 Indiana House of Representatives election was held on November 3, 2026, alongside the Indiana Senate election and the other 2026 United States elections. Voters elected members of the Indiana House of Representatives in all 100 of the U.S. state of Indiana's legislative districts to serve a two-year term.

Republicans' for the first time since 2010 did not win a two-thirds supermajority, as Democrats had a net gain total of 16 seats.

== Overview ==
2026 Indiana State House general election
Party	Votes	Percentage	% Change	Seats before	Candidates	Seats after	+/–
Republican	834,849	53.02%	▼10.65%	69	79	54	▼15
Democratic	723,252	45.93%	▲10.13%	30	91	46	▲16
Independent	9,186	0.58%	▲0.58%	1	2	0	▼1
Libertarian	6,572	0.42%	▼0.12%	0	4	0	Steady
Socialist	469	0.03%	▲0.03%	0	1	0	Steady
Green	275	0.02%	▲0.02%	0	1	0	Steady
Totals	1,574,603	100.00%	—	100		100	—

== Background ==
In the 2024 United States presidential election, Republican Donald Trump won 70 Indiana House districts while Democrat Kamala Harris won 30. Heading into the 2026 election, Democrats held three districts where Trump won in 2024: District 9, located in Michigan City (Trump +3%), District 43, located in Terre Haute (Trump +3%), and District 71, located in Jeffersonville (Trump +0.3%), while Republicans held one district where Harris won in 2024: District 62, which includes parts of Monroe, Brown, and Jackson counties (Harris+0.3%).

Harris 40–50% 50–60% 60–70% 70–80% 80–90% 90–100% / Trump 40–50% 50–60% 60–70% 70–80% 80–90% 90–100%

== Predictions ==
Source	Ranking	As of
Sabato's Crystal Ball	Likely R	January 22, 2026
State Navigate	Safe R	October 21, 2026

== Retirements ==
Nine incumbents retired.

=== Republicans ===
Six Republicans retired.

1. District 30: Michael Karickhoff retired.
2. District 56: Brad Barrett retired.
3. District 57: Craig Haggard retired to run for U.S. House for 4th district.
4. District 58: Michelle Davis retired to run for Indiana Senate.
5. District 63: Shane Lindauer retired.
6. District 70: Karen Engleman retired.

=== Democrats ===
Two Democrats retired.

1. District 9: Patricia Boy resigned her seat early in October 2025.
2. District 34: Sue Errington retired.

=== Independents ===
One Independent retired.

1. District 72: Edward Clere retired to run for mayor of New Albany in 2027. (Note: Clere left the Republican Party in January 2026 and was expelled from the Indiana House Republican caucus. He is running for mayor of New Albany as an independent.)

== Districts 1–25 ==
=== District 1 ===
The district had been represented by Democrat Carolyn Jackson since 2018. Jackson was re-elected unopposed in 2024.

==== Democratic primary ====
===== Candidates =====
====== Declared ======
- Carolyn Jackson, incumbent state representative

=== District 2 ===
The district had been represented by Democrat Earl Harris Jr. since 2016. Harris Jr. was re-elected with 82% of the vote in 2024.

==== Democratic primary ====
===== Candidates =====
====== Declared ======
- Earl Harris Jr., incumbent state representative

=== District 3 ===
The district had been represented by Democrat Ragen Hatcher since 2018. Hatcher was re-elected with 63.1% of the vote in 2024.

==== Democratic primary ====
===== Candidates =====
====== Declared ======
- Ragen Hatcher, incumbent state representative

=== District 4 ===
The district had been represented by Republican Edmond Soliday since 2006. Soliday was re-elected with 57.6% of the vote in 2024.

==== Republican primary ====
===== Candidates =====
====== Declared ======
- Edmond Soliday, incumbent state representative

==== Democratic primary ====
===== Candidates =====
====== Declared ======
- Ryan Kominakis, crane operator and veteran

==== Libertarian convention ====
===== Candidates =====
====== Nominee ======
- Travis Gearhart

==== General election ====
General election
Party	Candidate	Votes	%
Democratic	Ryan Kominakis	13,638	54.1
Republican	Edmond Soliday (incumbent)	10,416	41.3
Libertarian	Travis Gearhart	1,153	4.6
Total votes		25,204	100.0
Democratic gain from Republican			

=== District 5 ===
The district had been represented by Republican Dale DeVon since 2012. DeVon was re-elected with 54.6% of the vote in 2024.

==== Republican primary ====
===== Candidates =====
====== Declared ======
- Dale DeVon, incumbent state representative

==== Democratic primary ====
===== Candidates =====
====== Declared ======
- Alex Wait, screenwriter

===== Results =====
General election
Party	Candidate	Votes	%
Democratic	Alex Wait	10,925	52.5
Republican	Dale DeVon (incumbent)	9,901	47.5
Total votes		20,826	100.0
Democratic gain from Republican			

=== District 6 ===
The district had been represented by Democrat Maureen Bauer since 2020. Bauer was re-elected with 81% of the vote in 2024.

==== Democratic primary ====
===== Candidates =====
====== Declared ======
- Maureen Bauer, incumbent state representative

=== District 7 ===
The district had been represented by Republican Jake Teshka since 2020. Teshka was re-elected unopposed in 2024.

==== Republican primary ====
===== Candidates =====
====== Declared ======
- Jake Teshka, incumbent state representative

==== Democratic primary ====
===== Candidates =====
====== Declared ======
- Oliver Davis, South Bend city councilor (2007–present)

===== Results =====
General election
Party	Candidate	Votes	%
Republican	Jake Teshka (incumbent)	10,460	50.6
Democratic	Oliver Davis	10,213	49.4
Total votes		20,673	100.0
Republican hold			

=== District 8 ===
The district had been represented by Democrat Ryan Dvorak since 2002. Dvorak was re-elected unopposed in 2024.

==== Democratic primary ====
===== Candidates =====
====== Declared ======
- Ryan Dvorak, incumbent state representative

===== Results =====
General election
Party	Candidate	Votes	%
Democratic	Ryan Dvorak (incumbent)	12,953	66.5
Republican	Eric Harris	6,541	33.6
Total votes		19,494	100.0
Democratic hold			

=== District 9 ===
The district had been represented by Democrat Patricia Boy since 2018. Boy was re-elected with 51% of the vote in 2024. In October 2025, Boy announced she would resign on October 18, 2025. Randy Novak was selected via caucus to replace Boy and sworn in on October 22, 2025.

==== Democratic primary ====
===== Candidates =====
====== Declared ======
- Randy Novak, incumbent state representative

====== Declined ======
- Patricia Boy, former state representative (2019–2025)

==== Republican primary ====
===== Candidates =====
====== Declared ======
- Chris Cleveland, businessman

===== Results =====
General election
Party	Candidate	Votes	%
Democratic	Randy Novak (incumbent)	12,950	61
Republican	Chris Cleveland	8,298	39
Total votes			100.0
Democratic hold			

=== District 10 ===
The district had been represented by Democrat Charles Moseley since 2008. Moseley was re-elected with 52.1% of the vote in 2024.

==== Democratic primary ====
===== Candidates =====
====== Declared ======
- Charles Moseley, incumbent state representative

==== Republican primary ====
===== Candidates =====
====== Declared ======
- Ted Uzelac, Assistant Chief of Portage Police Department

===== Results =====
General election
Party	Candidate	Votes	%
Democratic	Charles Moseley (incumbent)	11,746	59.8
Republican	Ted Uzelac	7,895	40.2
Total votes		19,641	100.0
Democratic hold			

=== District 11 ===
The district had been represented by Republican Michael Aylesworth since 2014. Aylesworth was re-elected unopposed in 2024.

==== Republican primary ====
===== Candidates =====
====== Declared ======
- Michael Aylesworth, incumbent state representative

==== Democratic primary ====
===== Candidates =====
====== Declared ======
- Tyler Bridges

===== Results =====
General election
Party	Candidate	Votes	%
Republican	Michael Aylesworth (incumbent)	13,622	62.2
Democratic	Tyler Bridges	8,278	37.8
Total votes		21,900	100.0
Republican hold			

=== District 12 ===
The district had been represented by Democrat Mike Andrade since 2020. Andrade was re-elected with 55% of the vote in 2024.

==== Democratic primary ====
===== Candidates =====
====== Declared ======
- Mike Andrade, incumbent state representative

=== District 13 ===
The district had been represented by Republican Matt Commons since 2024. Commons was first elected with 73.7% of the vote in 2024.

==== Republican primary ====
===== Candidates =====
====== Declared ======
- Matt Commons, incumbent state representative

==== Democratic primary ====
===== Candidates =====
====== Nominee ======
- Brenna Geswein, engineer

==== Eliminated in primary ====
- Edward Moyer Jr., retired principal

==== Results ====
District 13 Democratic primary
Party	Candidate	Votes	%
Democratic	Brenna Geswein	1,670	78.8
Democratic	Edward Moyer Jr	457	21.5
Total votes		2,127	100.0

==== Socialist Party of Indiana convention ====
===== Candidates =====
====== Nominee ======
- Ben Davis

==== General election ====
General election
Party	Candidate	Votes	%
Republican	Matt Commons (incumbent)	12,749	61.3
Democratic	Brenna Geswein	7,572	36.4
Socialist	Ben Davis	469	2.3
Total votes		20,790	100.0
Republican hold			

=== District 14 ===
The district had been represented by Democrat Vernon Smith since 1990. Smith was re-elected with 72.1% of the vote in 2024.

==== Democratic primary ====
===== Candidates =====
====== Declared ======
- Vernon Smith, incumbent state representative

=== District 15 ===
The district had been represented by Republican Hal Slager since 2020, but previously held office from 2012 to 2018. Slager was elected with 63.3% of the vote in 2024.

==== Republican primary ====
===== Candidates =====
====== Declared ======
- Hal Slager, incumbent state representative

==== Democratic primary ====
===== Candidates =====
====== Declared ======
- Anthony Oberman

===== Results =====
General election
Party	Candidate	Votes	%
Republican	Hal Slager (incumbent)	13,482	52.2
Democratic	Anthony Oberman	12,341	47.8
Total votes		25,823	100.0
Republican hold			

=== District 16 ===
The district had been represented by Republican Kendell Culp since 2022. Culp was re-elected with 76.9% of the vote in 2024.

==== Republican primary ====
===== Candidates =====
====== Declared ======
- Kendell Culp, incumbent state representative

==== Democratic primary ====
===== Candidates =====
====== Declared ======
- Ashley Hammac

===== Results =====
General election
Party	Candidate	Votes	%
Republican	Kendell Culp (incumbent)	12,279	65.9
Democratic	Ashley Hammac	6,366	34.1
Total votes		18,645	100.0
Republican hold			

=== District 17 ===
The district had been represented by Republican Jack Jordan since 2016. Jordan was re-elected unopposed in 2024.

==== Republican primary ====
===== Candidates =====
====== Declared ======
- Jack Jordan, incumbent state representative

==== Democratic primary ====
===== Candidates =====
====== Declared ======
- Mary Gibson

===== Results =====
General election
Party	Candidate	Votes	%
Republican	Jack Jordan (incumbent)	11,101	65.6
Democratic	Mary Gibson	5,834	34.5
Total votes		16,935	100.0
Republican hold			

=== District 18 ===
The district had been represented by Republican David Abbott since 2022. Abbott was re-elected unopposed in 2024.

==== Republican primary ====
===== Candidates =====
====== Declared ======
- David Abbott, incumbent state representative

=== District 19 ===
The district had been represented by Republican Julie Olthoff since 2020, and she had previously represented it from 2014 to 2018. Olthoff was re-elected unopposed in 2024.

==== Republican primary ====
===== Candidates =====
====== Declared ======
- Julie Olthoff, incumbent state representative

==== Democratic primary ====
===== Candidates =====
====== Declared ======
- Nick Neal

===== Results =====
General election
Party	Candidate	Votes	%
Democratic	Nick Neal	12,655	51.3
Republican	Julie Olthoff (incumbent)	12,031	48.8
Total votes		24,686	100.0
Democratic gain from Republican			

=== District 20 ===
The district had been represented by Republican Jim Pressel since 2016. Pressel was re-elected unopposed in 2024.

==== Republican primary ====
===== Candidates =====
====== Nominee ======
- Jim Pressel, incumbent state representative

==== Eliminated in primary ====
- Juanita Haney

===== Endorsements =====
Jim Pressel

Executive branch officials

- Donald Trump, president of the United States (2017–2021, 2025–present)

Statewide officials

- Mike Braun, governor of Indiana (2025–present) and former senator (2019–2025)

Organizations

- Indiana Farm Bureau AgELECT PAC
- National Federation of Independent Business Indiana PAC
- NRA Political Victory Fund

==== Results ====
District 20 Republican primary
Party	Candidate	Votes	%
Republican	Jim Pressel (incumbent)	3,238	62.2
Republican	Juanita Haney	1,972	37.9
Total votes		5,210	100.0

==== Democratic primary ====
===== Candidates =====
====== Nominee ======
- Laura Liskey

==== Eliminated in primary ====
- Alicia Firanek

==== Results ====
District 20 Democratic primary
Party	Candidate	Votes	%
Democratic	Laura Liskey	1,350	52.7
Democratic	Alicia Firanek	1,212	47.3
Total votes		2,562	100.0

===== Results =====
General election
Party	Candidate	Votes	%
Republican	Jim Pressel (incumbent)	10,213	52.2
Democratic	Laura Liskey	8,974	46.8
Total votes		19,187	100.0
Republican hold			

=== District 21 ===
The district had been represented by Republican Timothy Wesco since 2010. Wesco was re-elected with 79.1% of the vote in 2024.

==== Republican primary ====
===== Candidates =====
====== Declared ======
- Timothy Wesco, incumbent state representative

==== Democratic primary ====
===== Candidates =====
====== Declared ======
- Charles Burkley

===== Results =====
General election
Party	Candidate	Votes	%
Republican	Timothy Wesco (incumbent)	7,486	58.5
Democratic	Charles Burkley	5,302	41.5
Total votes		12,788	100.0
Republican hold			

=== District 22 ===
The district had been represented by Republican Craig Snow since 2022. Snow was first elected to the district with 86.4% of the vote in 2024.

==== Republican primary ====
===== Candidates =====
====== Nominee ======
- Craig Snow, incumbent state representative

==== Eliminated in primary ====
- Daniel Koors

===== Endorsements =====
Craig Snow

Executive branch officials

- Donald Trump, president of the United States (2017–2021, 2025–present)

Statewide officials

- Mike Braun, governor of Indiana (2025–present) and former senator (2019–2025)

Organizations

- Indiana Farm Bureau AgELECT PAC
- National Federation of Independent Business Indiana PAC
- NRA Political Victory Fund

==== Results ====
District 22 Republican primary
Party	Candidate	Votes	%
Republican	Craig Snow (incumbent)	3,486	76.7
Republican	Daniel Koors	1,059	23.3
Total votes		4,545	100.0

=== District 23 ===
The district had been represented by Republican Ethan Manning since 2018. Manning was re-elected with 73.9% of the vote in 2024.

==== Republican primary ====
===== Candidates =====
====== Declared ======
- Ethan Manning, incumbent state representative

==== Democratic primary ====
===== Candidates =====
====== Declared ======
- Austin Meives

===== Results =====
General election
Party	Candidate	Votes	%
Republican	Ethan Manning (incumbent)	10,123	66.1
Democratic	Austin Meives	5,199	33.9
Total votes		15,322	100.0
Republican hold			

=== District 24 ===
The district had been represented by Republican Hunter Smith since 2024. Smith was elected with 56.2% of the vote in 2024.

==== Republican primary ====
===== Candidates =====
====== Declared ======
- Hunter Smith, incumbent state representative

==== Democratic primary ====
===== Candidates =====
====== Declared ======
- Racheal Bleicher, businesswoman

===== Results =====
General election
Party	Candidate	Votes	%
Democratic	Racheal Bleicher	17,509	53.1
Republican	Hunter Smith (incumbent)	15,490	46.9
Total votes		32,999	100.0
Democratic gain from Republican			

=== District 25 ===
The district had been represented by Republican Becky Cash since 2022. Cash was re-elected with 50.1% of the vote in 2024.

==== Republican primary ====
===== Candidates =====
====== Declared ======
- Becky Cash, incumbent state representative

==== Democratic primary ====
===== Candidates =====
====== Declared ======
- Tiffany Stoner, small business owner and nominee for this district in 2024

===== Results =====
General election
Party	Candidate	Votes	%
Democratic	Tiffany Stoner	16,847	58.6
Republican	Becky Cash (incumbent)	11,903	41.4
Total votes		28,750	100.0
Democratic gain from Republican			

== Districts 26–50 ==
=== District 26 ===
The district has been represented by Democrat Chris Campbell since 2018. Campbell was re-elected with 64.1% of the vote in 2024.

==== Democratic primary ====
===== Candidates =====
====== Declared ======
- Chris Campbell, incumbent state representative

==== Republican primary ====
===== Candidates =====
====== Declared ======
- Magdalaine Davis

=== General election ===
==== Results ====
General election
Party	Candidate	Votes	%
Democratic	Chris Campbell (incumbent)	8,597	70.7
Republican	Magdalaine Davis	3,561	29.3
Total votes		12,158	100.0
Democratic hold			

=== District 27 ===
The district has been represented by Democrat Sheila Klinker since 1982. Klinker was re-elected with 61.5% of the vote in 2024.

==== Democratic primary ====
===== Candidates =====
====== Declared ======
- Sheila Klinker, incumbent state representative

==== Republican primary ====
===== Candidates =====
====== Nominee ======
- Tracy Brown, Tippecanoe County commissioner and former Tippecanoe County sheriff

==== Eliminated in primary ====
- Oscar Alcarez, nominee for this district in 2024

==== Results ====
District 27 Republican primary
Party	Candidate	Votes	%
Republican	Tracy Brown	1,966	79.4
Republican	Oscar Alvarez	511	20.6
Total votes		2,477	100.0

=== General election ===
==== Results ====
General election
Party	Candidate	Votes	%
Democratic	Sheila Klinker (incumbent)	9,151	64.5
Republican	Tracy Brown	5,032	35.5
Total votes		14,183	100.0
Democratic hold			

=== District 28 ===
The district has been represented by Republican Jeff Thompson since 1998. Thompson was re-elected with 71.8% of the vote in 2024.

==== Republican primary ====
===== Candidates =====
====== Declared ======
- Jeff Thompson, incumbent state representative
- Sheila Zielinski, nurse

===== Endorsements =====
Jeff Thompson

Executive branch officials

- Donald Trump, president of the United States (2017–2021, 2025–present)

Statewide officials

- Mike Braun, governor of Indiana (2025–present) and former senator (2019–2025)

Organizations

- Indiana Farm Bureau AgELECT PAC
- National Federation of Independent Business Indiana PAC
- NRA Political Victory Fund

==== Results ====
District 28 Republican primary
Party	Candidate	Votes	%
Republican	Jeff Thompson (incumbent)	3,773	55.9
Republican	Sheila Zielinski	2,972	44.1
Total votes		6,745	100.0

==== Democratic primary ====
===== Candidates =====
====== Declared ======
- Karen Whitney

=== General election ===
==== Results ====
General election
Party	Candidate	Votes	%
Republican	Jeff Thompson (incumbent)	12,775	58.3
Democratic	Karen Whitney	9,138	41.7
Total votes		21,913	100.0
Republican hold			

=== District 29 ===
The district has been represented by Republican Alaina Shonkwiler since 2024. Shonkwiler was elected with 63.4% of the vote in 2024.

==== Republican primary ====
===== Candidates =====
====== Declared ======
- Alaina Shonkwiler, incumbent state representative

==== Democratic primary ====
===== Candidates =====
====== Declared ======
- Coumba Kebe, small business owner (later ran for state treasurer)
- Devon Wellington, education policy expert and small business owner

==== Results ====
District 29 Democratic primary
Party	Candidate	Votes	%
Democratic	Devon Wellington	1,921	53.7
Democratic	Coumba Kebe	1,655	46.3
Total votes		3,576	100.0

=== General election ===
==== Results ====
General election
Party	Candidate	Votes	%
Republican	Alaina Shonkwiler (incumbent)	14,623	52.4
Democratic	Devon Wellington	13,289	47.6
Total votes		27,912	100.0
Republican hold			

=== District 30 ===
The district has been represented by Republican Michael Karickhoff since 2010. Karickhoff was re-elected with 67.5% of the vote in 2024. In November 2025, it was announced that Karickhoff would retire at the end of his term.

==== Nominee ====
- Paula Davis, community advocate and Chapter Chair of the Howard County Moms for Liberty

==== Eliminated in primary ====
- Ray Collins, Kokomo common council president

===== Declined =====
- Michael Karickhoff, incumbent state representative

===== Endorsements =====
Paula Davis

Organizations

- Americans for Prosperity

==== Results ====
District 30 Republican primary
Party	Candidate	Votes	%
Republican	Paula Davis	3,354	66.3
Republican	Ray Collins	1,703	33.7
Total votes		5,057	100.0

==== Democratic primary ====
===== Nominee =====
- Jack Chance

=== General election ===
==== Results ====
General election
Party	Candidate	Votes	%
Republican	Paula Davis	9,953	53.9
Democratic	Jack Chance	8,523	46.1
Total votes		18,476	100.0
Republican hold			

=== District 31 ===
The district has been represented by Republican Lori Goss-Reaves since her appointment in 2023. Goss-Reaves was elected unopposed in 2024.

==== Republican primary ====
===== Candidates =====
====== Declared ======
- Lori Goss-Reaves, incumbent state representative

==== Democratic primary ====
===== Candidates =====
====== Declared ======
- Katie Robins

=== General election ===
==== Results ====
General election
Party	Candidate	Votes	%
Republican	Lori Goss-Reaves (incumbent)	10,974	64.8
Democratic	Katie Robins	5,955	35.2
Total votes		16,929	100.0
Republican hold			

=== District 32 ===
The district has been represented by Democrat Victoria Wilburn since 2022. Wilburn was elected with 52.1% of the vote in 2024.

==== Democratic primary ====
===== Candidates =====
====== Declared ======
- Victoria Wilburn, incumbent state representative

==== Republican caucus ====
===== Candidates =====
====== Declared ======
- Paul Nix, candidate for this district in 2022

=== General election ===
==== Results ====
General election
Party	Candidate	Votes	%
Democratic	Victoria Wilburn (incumbent)	16,628	62.7
Republican	Paul Nix	9,915	37.6
Total votes		26,543	100.0
Democratic hold			

=== District 33 ===
The district has been represented by Republican J. D. Prescott since 2018. Prescott was re-elected with 73% of the vote in 2024.

==== Republican primary ====
===== Candidates =====
====== Declared ======
- J.D. Prescott, incumbent state representative

==== Democratic primary ====
===== Candidates =====
====== Declared ======
- John Bartlett, nominee for this district in 2022 and 2024

=== General election ===
==== Results ====
General election
Party	Candidate	Votes	%
Republican	J.D. Prescott (incumbent)	10,570	58.1
Democratic	John Bartlett	7,620	41.9
Total votes		18,190	100.0
Republican hold			

=== District 34 ===
The district has been represented by Democrat Sue Errington since 2012. Errington was re-elected with 55.1% of the vote in 2024. She announced she would retire at the end of her term.

==== Democratic primary ====
===== Candidates =====
====== Declared ======
- Sara Gullion, Muncie city councilor

====== Declined ======
- Sue Errington, incumbent state representative

===== Endorsements =====
Sara Gullion

State legislators

- Sue Errington, state representative for the 34th district (2012–present)

==== Republican primary ====
===== Candidates =====
====== Declared ======
- Richard Ivy, Muncie city employee and former Muncie deputy mayor
- Randall McCallister

====== Withdrawn ======
- Tim Overton, Delaware County Republican Party Chairman
- Chris Walker, Muncie Central High School principal

==== Results ====
District 34 Republican primary
Party	Candidate	Votes	%
Republican	Richard Ivy	1,264	53.2
Republican	Randall McCallister	1,111	46.8
Total votes		2,375	100.0

=== General election ===
==== Results ====
General election
Party	Candidate	Votes	%
Democratic	Sara Gullion	9,714	63.2
Republican	Richard Ivy	5,647	36.8
Total votes		15,361	100.0
Democratic hold			

=== District 35 ===
The district has been represented by Republican Elizabeth Rowray since 2020. Rowray was re-elected with 71% of the vote in 2024.

==== Republican primary ====
===== Candidates =====
====== Declared ======
- Elizabeth Rowray, incumbent state representative

==== Democratic primary ====
===== Candidates =====
====== Declared ======
- Phil Gift, nominee for this district in 2024

=== General election ===
==== Results ====
General election
Party	Candidate	Votes	%
Republican	Elizabeth Rowray (incumbent)	13,010	60.7
Democratic	Phil Gift	8,434	39.3
Total votes		21,444	100.0
Republican hold			

=== District 36 ===
The district has been represented by Republican Kyle Pierce since 2022. Pierce was elected with 59% of the vote in 2024.

==== Republican primary ====
===== Candidates =====
====== Declared ======
- Kyle Pierce, incumbent state representative

==== Democratic primary ====
===== Candidates =====
====== Declared ======
- Nouhad Melki II
- Kim Townsend, director of the Anderson Housing Authority

==== Results ====
District 36 Democratic primary
Party	Candidate	Votes	%
Democratic	Kim Townsend	3,796	87.7
Democratic	Nouhad Melki II	530	12.3
Total votes		4,326	100.0

=== General election ===
==== Results ====
General election
Party	Candidate	Votes	%
Democratic	Kim Townsend	9,218	54.6
Republican	Kyle Pierce (incumbent)	7,670	45.4
Total votes		16,888	100.0
Democratic gain from Republican			

=== District 37 ===
The district has been represented by Republican Todd Huston since 2012. Huston was re-elected unopposed in 2024.

==== Republican primary ====
===== Candidates =====
====== Declared ======
- Todd Huston, incumbent state representative

==== Democratic primary ====
===== Candidates =====
====== Declared ======
- Lauren Cole
- Joel Levi, candidate for Senate District 20 in 2024

==== Results ====
District 37 Democratic primary
Party	Candidate	Votes	%
Democratic	Lauren Cole	2,167	55.2
Democratic	Joel Levi	1,757	44.8
Total votes		3,924	100.0

=== General election ===
==== Results ====
General election
Party	Candidate	Votes	%
Democratic	Lauren Cole	13,318	51.5
Republican	Todd Huston (incumbent)	12,532	48.5
Total votes		25,850	100.0
Democratic gain from Republican			

=== District 38 ===
The district has been represented by Republican Heath VanNatter since 2010. VanNatter was re-elected with 75.3% of the vote in 2024.

==== Republican primary ====
===== Candidates =====
====== Declared ======
- Mark Hufford, farmer
- Heath VanNatter, incumbent state representative

===== Endorsements =====
Heath VanNatter

Executive branch officials

- Donald Trump, president of the United States (2017–2021, 2025–present)

Statewide officials

- Mike Braun, governor of Indiana (2025–present) and former senator (2019–2025)

Organizations

- National Federation of Independent Business Indiana PAC
- NRA Political Victory Fund

==== Results ====
District 38 Republican primary
Party	Candidate	Votes	%
Republican	Heath VanNatter (incumbent)	4,676	58.5
Republican	Mark Hufford	3,316	41.5
Total votes		7,992	100.0

==== Democratic primary ====
===== Candidates =====
====== Declared ======
- Nate Stout

=== General election ===
==== Results ====
General election
Party	Candidate	Votes	%
Republican	Heath VanNatter (incumbent)	14,452	63.9
Democratic	Nate Stout	8,178	36.1
Total votes		22,630	100.0
Republican hold			

=== District 39 ===
The district has been represented by Republican Danny Lopez since 2024. Lopez was elected with 53.7% of the vote in 2024.

==== Republican primary ====
===== Candidates =====
====== Declared ======
- Danny Lopez, incumbent state representative

====== Disqualified ======
- Billy Qian

==== Democratic primary ====
===== Candidates =====
====== Declared ======
- Lindsay Gramlich, president of a nonprofit organization

=== General election ===
==== Results ====
General election
Party	Candidate	Votes	%
Democratic	Lindsay Gramlich	16,369	54.1
Republican	Danny Lopez (incumbent)	13,884	45.9
Total votes		30,253	100.0
Democratic gain from Republican			

=== District 40 ===
The district has been represented by Republican Greg Steuerwald since his appointment in 2007. Steuerwald was re-elected with 58.4% of the vote in 2024.

==== Republican primary ====
===== Candidates =====
====== Declared ======
- Sid Mahant, trucking company owner
- Greg Steuerwald, incumbent state representative

===== Endorsements =====
Greg Steuerwald

Statewide officials

- Mike Braun, governor of Indiana (2025–present) and former senator (2019–2025)

Organizations

- Americans for Prosperity
- Indiana Farm Bureau AgELECT PAC
- National Federation of Independent Business Indiana PAC
- NRA Political Victory Fund

==== Results ====
District 40 Republican primary
Party	Candidate	Votes	%
Republican	Greg Steuerwald (incumbent)	3,527	75.1
Republican	Sid Mahant	1,169	24.9
Total votes		4,696	100.0

==== Democratic primary ====
===== Candidates =====
====== Declared ======
- William Colteryahn

=== General election ===
==== Results ====
General election
Party	Candidate	Votes	%
Democratic	William Colteryahn	11,579	54.7
Republican	Greg Steuerwald (incumbent)	9,574	45.3
Total votes		21,153	100.0
Democratic gain from Republican			

=== District 41 ===
The district has been represented by Republican Mark Genda since 2022. Genda was elected with 73.1% of the vote in 2024.

==== Republican primary ====
===== Candidates =====
====== Declared ======
- Mark Genda, incumbent state representative

==== Democratic primary ====
===== Candidates =====
====== Declared ======
- Jackson Hayes

=== General election ===
==== Results ====
General election
Party	Candidate	Votes	%
Republican	Mark Genda (incumbent)	11,090	63.2
Democratic	Jackson Hayes	6,465	36.8
Total votes		17,555	100.0
Republican hold			

=== District 42 ===
The district has been represented by Republican Tim Yocum since 2025. After Alan Morrison was appointed to serve as the Director of the Indiana Department of Natural Resources, Yocum was chosen to replace him.

==== Republican primary ====
===== Candidates =====
====== Declared ======
- Tim Yocum, incumbent state representative

=== General election ===
==== Results ====
General election
Party	Candidate	Votes	%
Republican	Tim Yocum (incumbent)	11,337	60.4
Democratic	Brandi Vandivier	7,446	39.6
Total votes		18,783	100.0
Republican hold			

=== District 43 ===
The district has been represented by Democrat Tonya Pfaff since 2018. Pfaff was re-elected unopposed in 2024.

==== Democratic primary ====
===== Candidates =====
====== Declared ======
- Tonya Pfaff, incumbent state representative

==== Republican primary ====
===== Candidates =====
====== Declared ======
- Amy Lore, Vigo County School Board member

=== General election ===
==== Results ====
General election
Party	Candidate	Votes	%
Democratic	Tonya Pfaff (incumbent)	10,268	64.7
Republican	Amy Lore	5,612	35.3
Total votes		15,880	100.0
Democratic hold			

=== District 44 ===
The district has been represented by Republican Beau Baird since 2018. Baird was re-elected unopposed in 2024.

==== Republican primary ====
===== Candidates =====
====== Declared ======
- Beau Baird, incumbent state representative
- Clint Cooper

===== Endorsements =====
Beau Baird

Executive branch officials

- Donald Trump, president of the United States (2017–2021, 2025–present)

Statewide officials

- Mike Braun, governor of Indiana (2025–present) and former senator (2019–2025)

Organizations

- Indiana Farm Bureau AgELECT PAC
- National Federation of Independent Business Indiana PAC
- NRA Political Victory Fund

==== Results ====
District 44 Republican primary
Party	Candidate	Votes	%
Republican	Beau Baird (incumbent)	3,471	61.5
Republican	Clint Cooper	2,171	38.5
Total votes		5,642	100.0

==== Democratic primary ====
===== Candidates =====
====== Declared ======
- Kelsey Kauffman, educator

=== General election ===
==== Results ====
General election
Party	Candidate	Votes	%
Republican	Beau Baird (incumbent)	11,323	64.4
Democratic	Kelsey Kauffman	6,263	35.6
Total votes		17,586	100.0
Republican hold			

=== District 45 ===
The district has been represented by Republican Bruce Borders since 2014, but previously held office from 2004 to 2012. Borders was unopposed in 2024.

==== Republican primary ====
===== Candidates =====
====== Declared ======
- Bruce Borders, incumbent state representative
- Kellie Streeter, Knox County Commissioner and candidate for this district in 2024

===== Endorsements =====
Bruce Borders

Executive branch officials

- Donald Trump, president of the United States (2017–2021, 2025–present)

Statewide officials

- Mike Braun, governor of Indiana (2025–present) and former senator (2019–2025)

Organizations

- National Federation of Independent Business Indiana PAC
- NRA Political Victory Fund
Kellie Streeter

Organizations

- Indiana Farm Bureau AgELECT PAC

==== Results ====
District 45 Republican primary
Party	Candidate	Votes	%
Republican	Kellie Streeter	4,939	53.2
Republican	Bruce Borders (incumbent)	4,340	46.8
Total votes		9,279	100.0

==== Democratic primary ====
===== Candidates =====
====== Declared ======
- Rebecca "Becky" Mayfield

=== General election ===
==== Results ====
General election
Party	Candidate	Votes	%
Republican	Kellie Streeter	13,410	69.6
Democratic	Rebecca "Becky" Mayfield	5,856	30.4
Total votes		19,266	100.0
Republican hold			

=== District 46 ===
The district has been represented by Republican Bob Heaton since 2010. Heaton was re-elected with 67.9% of the vote in 2024.

==== Republican primary ====
===== Candidates =====
====== Declared ======
- Tom Arthur, former mayor of Brazil, Indiana (2004–2007)
- Bob Heaton, incumbent state representative

===== Endorsements =====
Bob Heaton

Executive branch officials

- Donald Trump, president of the United States (2017–2021, 2025–present)

Statewide officials

- Mike Braun, governor of Indiana (2025–present) and former senator (2019–2025)

Organizations

- National Federation of Independent Business Indiana PAC
- NRA Political Victory Fund

==== Results ====
District 46 Republican primary
Party	Candidate	Votes	%
Republican	Bob Heaton (incumbent)	4,479	68.9
Republican	Tom Arthur	2,022	31.1
Total votes		6,501	100.0

==== Democratic primary ====
===== Candidates =====
====== Declared ======
- James Pittsford III

=== General election ===
==== Results ====
General election
Party	Candidate	Votes	%
Republican	Bob Heaton (incumbent)	11,830	56.9
Democratic	James Pittsford III	8,950	43.1
Total votes		20,780	100.0
Republican hold			

=== District 47 ===
The district has been represented by Republican Robb Greene since 2022. Greene was re-elected with 74% of the vote in 2024.

==== Republican primary ====
===== Candidates =====
====== Declared ======
- Robb Greene, incumbent state representative

==== Democratic primary ====
===== Candidates =====
====== Declared ======
- Michael Potter

=== General election ===
==== Results ====
General election
Party	Candidate	Votes	%
Republican	Robb Greene (incumbent)	13,277	63.4
Democratic	Michael Potter	7,656	36.6
Total votes		20,933	100.0
Republican hold			

=== District 48 ===
The district has been represented by Republican Doug Miller since 2014. Miller was re-elected unopposed in 2024.

==== Republican primary ====
===== Candidates =====
====== Declared ======
- Doug Miller, incumbent state representative

==== Democratic primary ====
===== Candidates =====
====== Declared ======
- Carl Stutsman
- Emily Yaw

==== Results ====
District 48 Democratic primary
Party	Candidate	Votes	%
Democratic	Emily Yaw	1,007	54
Democratic	Carl Stutsman	858	46
Total votes		1,865	100.0

==== Green Party ====
===== Candidates =====
====== Declared ======
- Marshall Travis, RV industry worker

==== General election ====
General election results
Party	Candidate	Votes	%
Republican	Doug Miller (incumbent)	8,513	54.6
Democratic	Emily Yaw	6,810	43.7
Green	Marshall Travis	275	1.8
Total votes		15,598	100.0
Republican hold			

=== District 49 ===
The district has been represented by Republican Joanna King since her appointment in 2020. King was re-elected unopposed in 2024.

==== Republican primary ====
===== Candidates =====
====== Declared ======
- Joanna King, incumbent state representative

==== Democratic primary ====
===== Candidates =====
====== Declared ======
- Monica Garbaciak
- Susan Lawson
- Michelle Milne

==== Results ====
District 49 Democratic primary
Party	Candidate	Votes	%
Democratic	Michelle Milne	1,471	66.7
Democratic	Susan Lawson	445	20.2
Democratic	Monica Garbaciak	288	13.1
Total votes		2,204	100.0

=== General election ===
==== Results ====
General election
Party	Candidate	Votes	%
Republican	Joanna King (incumbent)	8,319	53.4
Democratic	Michelle Milne	7,259	46.6
Total votes		15,578	100.0
Republican hold			

=== District 50 ===
The district has been represented by Republican Lorissa Sweet since 2022. Sweet was elected with 76.9% of the vote in 2024.

==== Republican primary ====
===== Candidates =====
====== Declared ======
- Lorissa Sweet, incumbent state representative

==== Democratic primary ====
===== Candidates =====
====== Declared ======
- Pepper Snyder, Libertarian nominee for Indiana's 3rd congressional district in 2016

=== General election ===
==== Results ====
General election
Party	Candidate	Votes	%
Republican	Lorissa Sweet (incumbent)	12,769	66.9
Democratic	Pepper Snyder	6,318	33.1
Total votes		19,087	100.0
Republican hold			

== Districts 51–75 ==
=== District 51 ===
The district has been represented by Republican Tony Isa since 2024. Isa was elected with 74.4% of the vote in 2024.

==== Republican primary ====
===== Candidates =====
====== Declared ======
- Tony Isa, incumbent state representative
- Theresa Steele

===== Endorsements =====
Tony Isa

Executive branch officials

- Donald Trump, president of the United States (2017–2021, 2025–present)

Statewide officials

- Mike Braun, governor of Indiana (2025–present) and former senator (2019–2025)

Organizations

- Americans for Prosperity
- Indiana Farm Bureau AgELECT PAC
- National Federation of Independent Business Indiana PAC
- NRA Political Victory Fund

==== Results ====
District 51 Republican primary
Party	Candidate	Votes	%
Republican	Tony Isa (incumbent)	3,995	68.2
Republican	Theresa Steele	1,862	31.8
Total votes		5,857	100.0

==== Democratic primary ====
===== Candidates =====
====== Declared ======
- Judy Rowe, real estate broker

=== General election ===
==== Results ====
General election
Party	Candidate	Votes	%
Republican	Tony Isa (incumbent)	10,010	67.5
Democratic	Judy Rowe	4,822	32.5
Total votes		14,832	100.0
Republican hold			

=== District 52 ===
The district has been represented by Republican Ben Smaltz since 2012. Smaltz was re-elected with 76.7% of the vote in 2024.

==== Republican primary ====
===== Candidates =====
====== Declared ======
- Ben Smaltz, incumbent state representative
- Eve Peters

===== Endorsements =====
Ben Smaltz

Executive branch officials

- Donald Trump, president of the United States (2017–2021, 2025–present)

Statewide officials

- Mike Braun, governor of Indiana (2025–present) and former senator (2019–2025)

Organizations

- Americans for Prosperity
- Indiana Farm Bureau AgELECT PAC
- National Federation of Independent Business Indiana PAC
- NRA Political Victory Fund

==== Results ====
District 52 Republican primary
Party	Candidate	Votes	%
Republican	Ben Smaltz (incumbent)	4,408	73.7
Republican	Eve Peters	1,573	26.3
Total votes		5,981	100.0

=== General election ===
==== Results ====
General election
Party	Candidate	Votes	%
Republican	Ben Smaltz (incumbent)	11,562	65.8
Democratic	Joseph Trost	6,001	34.2
Total votes		17,563	100.0
Republican hold			

=== District 53 ===
The district has been represented by Republican Ethan Lawson since 2024. Lawson was elected with 70.4% of the vote in 2024.

==== Republican primary ====
===== Candidates =====
====== Declared ======
- Ethan Lawson, incumbent state representative

=== General election ===
==== Results ====
General election
Party	Candidate	Votes	%
Republican	Ethan Lawson (incumbent)		
Democratic	Reece Axel-Adams		
Total votes			100.0

=== District 54 ===
The district has been represented by Republican Cory Criswell since 2022. Criswell was re-elected unopposed in 2024.

==== Republican primary ====
===== Candidates =====
====== Declared ======
- Cory Criswell, incumbent state representative

=== General election ===
==== Results ====
General election
Party	Candidate	Votes	%
Republican	Cory Criswell (incumbent)	11,916	67
Democratic	Nan Polk	5,878	33
Total votes		17,794	100.0
Republican hold			

=== District 55 ===
The district has been represented by Republican Lindsay Patterson since 2022. Patterson was re-elected with 80.5% of the vote in 2024.

==== Republican primary ====
===== Candidates =====
====== Declared ======
- Lindsay Patterson, incumbent state representative

==== Democratic primary ====
===== Candidates =====
====== Declared ======
- Victoria Martz, lawyer and chairwoman of Ripley County Democrats

=== General election ===
==== Results ====
General election
Party	Candidate	Votes	%
Republican	Lindsay Patterson (incumbent)	12,944	71.4
Democratic	Victoria Martz	5,191	28.6
Total votes		18,135	100.0
Republican hold			

=== District 56 ===
The district has been represented by Republican Brad Barrett since 2018. Barrett was re-elected unopposed in 2024. In January 2026, Barrett announced he would retire at the end of his term.

==== Republican primary ====
===== Candidates =====
====== Declared ======
- Randy Retter, Wayne County sheriff
- Pete Zaleski, businessman

====== Withdrawn ======
- Adam Blanton, Assistant Chief of Richmond Police Department (endorsed Zaleski, remained on ballot)

====== Declined ======
- Brad Barrett, incumbent state representative

===== Endorsements =====
Randy Retter

Organizations

- NRA Political Victory Fund

==== Results ====
District 56 Republican primary
Party	Candidate	Votes	%
Republican	Randy Retter	3,250	53.0
Republican	Pete Zaleski	2,603	42.4
Republican	Adam Blanton	281	4.6
Total votes		6,134	100.0

==== Democratic primary ====
===== Candidates =====
====== Declared ======
- Thomas Rockwell

=== General election ===
==== Results ====
General election
Party	Candidate	Votes	%
Republican	Randy Retter	9,687	59
Democratic	Thomas Rockwell	6,739	41
Total votes		16,426	100.0
Republican hold			

=== District 57 ===
The district has been represented by Republican Craig Haggard since 2022. He was elected unopposed in 2024. Haggard is choosing to run for Indiana's 4th congressional district leaving this seat open.

==== Republican primary ====
===== Candidates =====
====== Declared ======
- Wes Bennett
- Greg “No Bull” Knott
- Rob Stiles
- Tina Turner, Morgan County Republican secretary

====== Declined ======
- Craig Haggard, incumbent state representative (running for U.S. House for 4th district)

==== Results ====
District 57 Republican primary
Party	Candidate	Votes	%
Republican	Wes Bennett	1,450	31.2
Republican	Greg “No Bull” Knott	1,372	29.5
Republican	Rob Stiles	924	19.9
Republican	Tina Turner	904	19.4
Total votes		4,650	100.0

==== Democratic primary ====
===== Candidates =====
====== Declared ======
- Suzanne Fortenberry, courier and nominee for Indiana Senate district 36 in 2024

=== General election ===
==== Results ====
General election
Party	Candidate	Votes	%
Republican	Wes Bennett	10,280	55.6
Democratic	Suzanne Fortenberry	8,200	44.4
Total votes		18,480	100.0
Republican hold			

=== District 58 ===
The district has been represented by Republican Michelle Davis since 2020. Davis was re-elected with 67.4% of the vote in 2024. Davis is choosing to run for State Senate instead leaving this seat open.

==== Republican primary ====
===== Candidates =====
====== Declared ======
- Ed Brickley, realtor and retired police officer
- John Reed, dean of students at Indiana Baptist College
- John Young, former state representative for the 47th district (2016–2022)

====== Declined ======
- Michelle Davis, incumbent state representative (running for State Senate District 41)

===== Endorsements =====
Ed Brickley

Organizations

- Indiana Farm Bureau AgELECT PAC
John Reed

Organizations

- Americans for Prosperity

==== Results ====
District 58 Republican primary
Party	Candidate	Votes	%
Republican	John Reed	1,690	42.5
Republican	Ed Brickley	1,330	33.5
Republican	John Young	952	24.0
Total votes		3,972	100.0

==== Democratic primary ====
===== Candidates =====
====== Declared ======
- Eric Reingardt
- Michelle Hennessee Sears

==== Results ====
District 58 Democratic primary
Party	Candidate	Votes	%
Democratic	Michelle Hennessee Sears	1,327	75.2
Democratic	Eric Reingardt	437	24.8
Total votes		1,764	100.0

=== General election ===
==== Results ====
General election
Party	Candidate	Votes	%
Republican	John Reed	8,806	52.7
Democratic	Michelle Hennessee Sears	7,907	47.3
Total votes		16,713	100.0
Republican hold			

=== District 59 ===
The district had been represented by Republican Ryan Lauer since 2018. Lauer was re-elected with 63.8% of the vote in 2024.

==== Republican primary ====
===== Candidates =====
====== Declared ======
- Ryan Lauer, incumbent state representative

=== General election ===
==== Results ====
General election
Party	Candidate	Votes	%
Republican	Ryan Lauer (incumbent)	9,530	51.2
Democratic	Josh Burbrink	9,097	48.8
Total votes		18,627	100.0
Republican hold			

=== District 60 ===
The district has been represented by Republican Peggy Mayfield since 2012. Mayfield was re-elected with 75.7% of the vote in 2024.

==== Republican primary ====
===== Candidates =====
====== Declared ======
- Peggy Mayfield, incumbent state representative
- Mike Moore, police officer
- David Waters

===== Endorsements =====
Peggy Mayfield

Statewide officials

- Mike Braun, governor of Indiana (2025–present) and former senator (2019–2025)

Organizations

- Indiana Farm Bureau AgELECT PAC
- National Federation of Independent Business Indiana PAC
- NRA Political Victory Fund

==== Democratic primary ====
===== Candidates =====
====== Declared ======
- Carrie L. Syczylo

=== General election ===
==== Results ====
General election
Party	Candidate	Votes	%
Republican	Peggy Mayfield (incumbent)	13,618	64.6
Democratic	Carrie Syczylo	7,450	35.4
Total votes		21,068	100.0
Republican hold			

=== District 61 ===
The district has been represented by Democrat Matt Pierce since 2002. Pierce was re-elected unopposed in 2024.

==== Democratic primary ====
===== Candidates =====
====== Declared ======
- Matt Pierce, incumbent state representative
- Lilliana Young, hostess and busser

===== Endorsements =====
Matt Pierce

Organizations

- Indiana Farm Bureau AgELECT PAC

==== Results ====
District 61 Democratic primary
Party	Candidate	Votes	%
Democratic	Matt Pierce (incumbent)	3,820	67.0
Democratic	Lilliana Young	1,879	33.0
Total votes		5,699	100.0

=== District 62 ===
The district has been represented by Republican Dave Hall since 2022. Hall was re-elected with 51.1% of the vote in 2024.

==== Republican primary ====
===== Candidates =====
====== Declared ======
- Dave Hall, incumbent state representative

==== Democratic primary ====
===== Candidates =====
====== Declared ======
- Amy Huffman Oliver, former deputy prosecutor

=== General election ===
==== Results ====
General election
Party	Candidate	Votes	%
Democratic	Amy Huffman Oliver	15,748	59.3
Republican	Dave Hall (incumbent)	10,799	40.7
Total votes		26,547	100.0
Democratic gain from Republican			

=== District 63 ===
The district has been represented by Republican Shane Lindauer since his appointment in 2017. Lindauer was re-elected with 76.3% of the vote in 2024. In October 2025, Lindauer announced he would retire at the end of his term.

==== Republican primary ====
===== Candidates =====
====== Declared ======
- Amy Kippenbrock, Dubois County Clerk and Dubois County GOP Chairman
- Richard Moss, otolaryngologist, candidate for House District 63 in 2014, and candidate for Indiana's 8th congressional district in 2016, 2018, and 2024

====== Declined ======
- Shane Lindauer, incumbent state representative

==== Results ====
District 63 Republican primary
Party	Candidate	Votes	%
Republican	Amy Kippenbrock	6,838	77.4
Republican	Richard Moss	2,001	22.6
Total votes		8,839	100.0

==== Democratic primary ====
===== Candidates =====
====== Declared ======
- Tiffanie Arthur
- Tony Bolen
- Adam Mann

==== Results ====
District 63 Democratic primary
Party	Candidate	Votes	%
Democratic	Tiffanie Arthur	1,071	63.8
Democratic	Tony Bolen	344	20.5
Democratic	Adam Mann	264	15.7
Total votes		8,839	100.0

=== General election ===
==== Results ====
General election
Party	Candidate	Votes	%
Republican	Amy Kippenbrock	11,718	61
Democratic	Tiffanie Arthur	7,482	39
Total votes		19,200	100.0
Republican hold			

=== District 64 ===
The district has been represented by Republican Matt Hostettler since 2018. Hostettler was re-elected unopposed in 2024.

==== Republican primary ====
===== Candidates =====
====== Declared ======
- Matt Hostettler, incumbent state representative

==== Democratic primary ====
===== Candidates =====
====== Declared ======
- Candace Greer

====== Withdrew ======
- Kellie Moore, cook and candidate for Indiana's 8th congressional district in 2024

=== General election ===
==== Results ====
General election
Party	Candidate	Votes	%
Republican	Matt Hostettler (incumbent)	12,878	66.3
Democratic	Candace Greer	6,554	33.7
Total votes		19,432	100.0
Republican hold			

=== District 65 ===
The district has been represented by Republican Christopher May since 2016. May was re-elected unopposed in 2024.

==== Republican primary ====
===== Candidates =====
====== Declared ======
- Christopher May, incumbent state representative

=== General election ===
==== Results ====
General election
Party	Candidate	Votes	%
Republican	Christopher May (incumbent)	10,331	57.0
Independent	Sean Steele	7,805	43.0
Total votes		18,136	100.0
Republican hold			

=== District 66 ===
The district has been represented by Republican Zach Payne since 2020. Payne was re-elected with 69.4% of the vote in 2024.

==== Republican primary ====
===== Candidates =====
====== Declared ======
- Zach Payne, incumbent state representative

==== Democratic primary ====
===== Candidates =====
====== Declared ======
- Ryan Price

=== General election ===
==== Results ====
General election
Party	Candidate	Votes	%
Republican	Zach Payne (incumbent)	12,615	60
Democratic	Ryan Price	8,386	40
Total votes		21,001	100.0
Republican hold			

=== District 67 ===
The district has been represented by Republican Alex Zimmerman since 2023. Zimmerman was elected unopposed in 2024.

==== Republican primary ====
===== Candidates =====
====== Declared ======
- Alex Zimmerman, incumbent state representative

==== Democratic primary ====
===== Candidates =====
====== Declared ======
- Justin Chadwick

=== General election ===
==== Results ====
General election
Party	Candidate	Votes	%
Republican	Alex Zimmerman (incumbent)	12,838	68
Democratic	Justin Chadwick	6,026	32
Total votes		18,864	100.0
Republican hold			

=== District 68 ===
The district has been represented by Republican Garrett Bascom since 2024. He was elected with 79.5% of the vote in 2024.

==== Republican primary ====
===== Candidates =====
====== Declared ======
- Garrett Bascom, incumbent state representative

==== Democratic primary ====
===== Candidates =====
====== Declared ======
- Hunter Collins, labor organizer

=== General election ===
==== Results ====
General election
Party	Candidate	Votes	%
Republican	Garrett Bascom (incumbent)	14,366	73.1
Democratic	Hunter Collins	5,281	26.9
Total votes		19,647	100.0
Republican hold			

=== District 69 ===
The district has been represented by Republican Jim Lucas since 2012. Lucas was re-elected with 68.7% of the vote in 2024.

==== Republican primary ====
===== Candidates =====
====== Declared ======
- Jim Lucas, incumbent state representative

==== Democratic primary ====
===== Candidates =====
====== Declared ======
- Chris Bowen

=== General election ===
==== Results ====
General election
Party	Candidate	Votes	%
Republican	Jim Lucas (incumbent)	10,010	60.2
Democratic	Chris Bowen	5,225	31.5
Independent	Tyler Henkle	1,381	8.3
Total votes		16,616	100.0
Republican hold			

=== District 70 ===
The district has been represented by Republican Karen Engleman since 2016. Engleman was re-elected with 73.4% of the vote in 2024. She announced she would be retiring at the end of her term.

==== Republican primary ====
===== Candidates =====
====== Declared ======
- John Colburn, candidate for this district in 2024
- Scott Fluhr, human resources analyst and Chairman of the Harrison County Republican Party

====== Declined ======
- Karen Engleman, incumbent state representative

==== Results ====
District 70 Republican primary
Party	Candidate	Votes	%
Republican	Scott Fluhr	4,159	68.5
Republican	John Colburn	1,914	31.5
Total votes		6,073	100.0

==== Democratic primary ====
===== Candidates =====
====== Declared ======
- Sarah Blessing
- Jerry Finn, businessman
- Tamyra Persinger-Andres

==== Results ====
District 70 Democratic primary
Party	Candidate	Votes	%
Democratic	Sarah Blessing	1,477	49.9
Democratic	Jerry Finn	1,096	37.0
Democratic	Tamyra Persinger-Andres	387	13.1
Total votes		2,960	100.0

=== General election ===
==== Results ====
General election
Party	Candidate	Votes	%
Republican	Scott Fluhr	13,798	59.9
Democratic	Sarah Blessing	8,502	36.9
Libertarian	Brandi Tibben	723	3.1
Total votes		23,023	100.0
Republican hold			

=== District 71 ===
The district has been represented by Democrat Wendy Dant Chesser since 2024. Previous representative Rita Fleming retired from the General Assembly effective immediately one week after the 2024 primary. Wendy Dant Chesser was chosen to fulfill out the remainder of her term and won election to a full term with 49.6% of the vote in 2024.

==== Democratic primary ====
===== Candidates =====
====== Declared ======
- Wendy Dant Chesser, incumbent state representative

==== Republican primary ====
===== Candidates =====
====== Declared ======
- D.M. Bagshaw
- James McClure Jr., candidate for this district in 2024

==== Results ====
District 71 Republican primary
Party	Candidate	Votes	%
Republican	James McClure Jr.	1,337	55.1
Republican	D.M. Bagshaw	1,090	44.9
Total votes		2,427	100.0

=== General election ===
==== Results ====
General election
Party	Candidate	Votes	%
Democratic	Wendy Dant Chesser (incumbent)	12,548	63.6
Republican	James McClure Jr.	7,173	36.4
Total votes		19,721	100.0
Democratic hold			

=== District 72 ===
The district has been represented by former Republican turned independent, Edward Clere since 2008. Clere was re-elected with 57.3% of the vote in 2024. In January 2026, Clere announced that he would retire at the end of his term and run for mayor of New Albany as an independent in 2027.

==== Republican primary ====
===== Candidates =====
====== Declared ======
- Shawn Carruthers, former Floyd County commissioner
- Darrell Neeley, veteran

====== Declined ======
- Edward Clere, incumbent state representative (running for mayor of New Albany in 2027)

==== Results ====
District 72 Republican primary
Party	Candidate	Votes	%
Republican	Darrell Neeley	2,315	54.2
Republican	Shawn Carruthers	1,957	45.8
Total votes		4,272	100.0

==== Democratic primary ====
===== Candidates =====
====== Declared ======
- Cory Cochran
- Michele Henry

==== Results ====
District 72 Democratic primary
Party	Candidate	Votes	%
Democratic	Michele Henry	2,248	52.2
Democratic	Cory Cochran	2,062	47.8
Total votes		4,310	100.0

=== General election ===
==== Results ====
General election
Party	Candidate	Votes	%
Democratic	Michele Henry	12,434	52.6
Republican	Darrell Neeley	11,190	47.4
Total votes			100.0
Democratic gain from Independent			

=== District 73 ===
The district has been represented by Republican Jennifer Meltzer since 2022. Meltzer was elected with 76.9% in the vote in 2024.

==== Republican primary ====
===== Candidates =====
====== Declared ======
- Edward Comstock, Air Force veteran, candidate for House District 57 in 2020, and candidate for this seat in 2022 and 2024
- Jennifer Meltzer, incumbent state representative

====== Disqualified ======
- Jacob Johnson, tradesman

===== Endorsements =====
Jennifer Meltzer

Statewide officials

- Mike Braun, governor of Indiana (2025–present) and former senator (2019–2025)

Organizations

- National Federation of Independent Business Indiana PAC
- NRA Political Victory Fund

==== Results ====
District 73 Republican primary
Party	Candidate	Votes	%
Republican	Jennifer Meltzer (incumbent)	3,675	66.6
Republican	Edward Comstock	1,844	33.4
Total votes		5,519	100.0

==== Democratic primary ====
===== Candidates =====
====== Declared ======
- Allen J. (A.J.) Miller

=== General election ===
==== Results ====
General election
Party	Candidate	Votes	%
Republican	Jennifer Meltzer (incumbent)	10,905	65.0
Democratic	Allen J. (A.J.) Miller	5,870	35.0
Total votes		16,775	100.0
Republican hold			

=== District 74 ===
The district has been represented by Republican Stephen Bartels since his appointment in 2017. Bartels was re-elected with 68.6% in 2024.

==== Republican primary ====
===== Candidates =====
====== Declared ======
- Stephen Bartels, incumbent state representative

=== General election ===
==== Results ====
General election
Party	Candidate	Votes	%
Republican	Stephen Bartels (incumbent)	13,189	60.4
Democratic	Lena Goffinet	8,649	39.6
Total votes		21,838	100.0
Republican hold			

=== District 75 ===
The district has been represented by Republican Cindy Ledbetter since 2020. Ledbetter was re-elected unopposed in 2024.

==== Republican primary ====
===== Candidates =====
====== Declared ======
- Cindy Ledbetter, incumbent state representative

=== General election ===
==== Results ====
General election
Party	Candidate	Votes	%
Republican	Cindy Ledbetter (incumbent)	12,384	57.8
Democratic	Mason Barclay	9,036	42.2
Total votes		21,420	100.0
Republican hold			

== Districts 76–100 ==
=== District 76 ===
The district has been represented by Republican Wendy McNamara since 2010. McNamara was re-elected unopposed in 2024.

==== Republican primary ====
===== Candidates =====
====== Declared ======
- Wendy McNamara, incumbent state representative

==== Democratic primary ====
===== Candidates =====
====== Declared ======
- Logan Patberg

=== General election ===
==== Results ====
General election
Party	Candidate	Votes	%
Republican	Wendy McNamara (incumbent)	11,114	56.2
Democratic	Logan Patberg	8,659	43.8
Total votes		19,773	100.0
Republican hold			

=== District 77 ===
The district has been represented by Democrat Alex Burton since 2024. He was elected unopposed in 2024.

==== Democratic primary ====
===== Candidates =====
====== Declared ======
- Alex Burton, incumbent state representative

=== District 78 ===
The district has been represented by Republican Tim O'Brien since his appointment in 2021. O'Brien was re-elected unopposed in 2024.

==== Republican primary ====
===== Candidates =====
====== Declared ======
- Tim O'Brien, incumbent state representative

==== Democratic primary ====
===== Candidates =====
====== Declared ======
- Sally Busby

=== General election ===
==== Results ====
General election
Party	Candidate	Votes	%
Republican	Tim O'Brien (incumbent)	10,765	50.1
Democratic	Sally Busby	10,707	49.9
Total votes		21,472	100.0
Republican hold			

=== District 79 ===
The district has been represented by Republican Matt Lehman since 2008. Lehman was re-elected unopposed in 2024.

==== Republican primary ====
===== Candidates =====
====== Declared ======
- Matt Lehman, incumbent state representative

==== Democratic primary ====
===== Candidates =====
====== Declared ======
- Ian Richardson, healthcare worker

=== General election ===
==== Results ====
General election
Party	Candidate	Votes	%
Republican	Matt Lehman (incumbent)	12,859	73.9
Democratic	Ian Richardson	4,546	26.1
Total votes		17,405	100.0

=== District 80 ===
The district has been represented by Democrat Phil GiaQuinta since 2006. GiaQuinta was re-elected unopposed in 2024.

==== Democratic primary ====
===== Candidates =====
====== Declared ======
- Phil GiaQuinta, incumbent state representative

=== District 81 ===
The district has been represented by Republican Martin Carbaugh since 2012. Carbaugh was re-elected with 64.9% of the vote in 2024.

==== Republican primary ====
===== Candidates =====
====== Declared ======
- Martin Carbaugh, incumbent state representative
- David Mervar, candidate for this district in 2024

===== Endorsements =====
Martin Carbaugh

Executive branch officials

- Donald Trump, president of the United States (2017–2021, 2025–present)

Statewide officials

- Mike Braun, governor of Indiana (2025–present) and former senator (2019–2025)

Organizations

- Americans for Prosperity
- National Federation of Independent Business Indiana PAC
- NRA Political Victory Fund

==== Results ====
District 81 Republican primary
Party	Candidate	Votes	%
Republican	Martin Carbaugh (incumbent)	3,795	75.1
Republican	David Mervar	1,256	24.9
Total votes		5,051	100.0

==== Democratic primary ====
===== Candidates =====
====== Declared ======
- Chad Clevidence
- Sharon Wight

==== Results ====
District 81 Democratic primary
Party	Candidate	Votes	%
Democratic	Sharon Wight	1,976	81.6
Democratic	Chad Clevidence	446	18.4
Total votes		2,422	100.0

=== General election ===
==== Results ====
General election
Party	Candidate	Votes	%
Republican	Martin Carbaugh (incumbent)	10,976	52.7
Democratic	Sharon Wight	9,851	47.3
Total votes		20,827	100.0
Republican hold			

=== District 82 ===
The district has been represented by Democrat Kyle Miller since 2022. Miller was re-elected unopposed in 2024.

==== Democratic primary ====
===== Candidates =====
====== Declared ======
- Kyle Miller, incumbent state representative

=== District 83 ===
The district has been represented by Republican Christopher Judy since 2014. Judy was re-elected with 64% of the vote in 2024.

==== Republican primary ====
===== Candidates =====
====== Declared ======
- Christopher Judy, incumbent state representative

==== Democratic primary ====
===== Candidates =====
====== Declared ======
- Wesley Haffenden

=== General election ===
==== Results ====
General election
Party	Candidate	Votes	%
Republican	Christopher Judy (incumbent)	11,974	53
Democratic	Wesley Haffenden	10,608	47
Total votes		22,582	100.0
Republican hold			

=== District 84 ===
The district has been represented by Republican Bob Morris since 2010. Morris was re-elected unopposed in 2024.

==== Republican primary ====
===== Candidates =====
====== Declared ======
- Bob Morris, incumbent state representative

==== Democratic primary ====
===== Candidates =====
====== Declared ======
- Misti Meehan

=== General election ===
==== Results ====
General election
Party	Candidate	Votes	%
Democratic	Misti Meehan	10,459	51.2
Republican	Bob Morris (incumbent)	9,967	48.8
Total votes		20,426	100.0
Democratic gain from Republican			

=== District 85 ===
The district has been represented by Republican Dave Heine since 2016. Heine was re-elected with 74.4% of the vote in 2024.

==== Republican primary ====
===== Candidates =====
====== Declared ======
- Dave Heine, incumbent state representative

==== Democratic primary ====
===== Candidates =====
====== Declared ======
- Mark Wehrle

=== General election ===
==== Results ====
General election
Party	Candidate	Votes	%
Republican	Dave Heine (incumbent)	12,674	63.7
Democratic	Mark Wehrle	7,238	36.4
Total votes		19,912	100.0
Republican hold			

=== District 86 ===
The district has been represented by Democrat Ed DeLaney since 2008. DeLaney was re-elected unopposed in 2024.

==== Democratic primary ====
===== Candidates =====
====== Declared ======
- Ed DeLaney, incumbent state representative

==== Republican primary ====
===== Candidates =====
====== Declared ======
- Glenn Bill

=== General election ===
==== Results ====
General election
Party	Candidate	Votes	%
Democratic	Ed DeLaney (incumbent)	22,618	78
Republican	Glenn Bill	6,379	22
Total votes		28,997	100.0
Democratic hold			

=== District 87 ===
The district has been represented by Democrat Carey Hamilton since 2016. Hamilton was re-elected unopposed in 2024.

==== Democratic primary ====
===== Candidates =====
====== Declared ======
- Carey Hamilton, incumbent state representative

=== District 88 ===
The district has been represented by Republican Chris Jeter since 2020. Jeter was re-elected with 57.8% of the vote in 2024.

==== Republican primary ====
===== Candidates =====
====== Declared ======
- Chris Jeter, incumbent state representative

==== Democratic primary ====
===== Candidates =====
====== Declared ======
- Stephanie Jo Yocum, nominee for this district in 2024

=== General election ===
==== Results ====
General election
Party	Candidate	Votes	%
Democratic	Stephanie Jo Yocum	15,473	54.1
Republican	Chris Jeter (incumbent)	13,113	45.9
Total votes		28,586	100.0
Democratic gain from Republican			

=== District 89 ===
The district has been represented by Democrat Mitch Gore since 2020. Gore was re-elected with 55.8% of the vote in 2024.

==== Democratic primary ====
===== Candidates =====
====== Declared ======
- Mitch Gore, incumbent state representative

==== Libertarian convention ====
===== Candidates =====
====== Nominee ======
- Drew Weingarten

==== General election ====
General election results
Party	Candidate	Votes	%
Democratic	Mitch Gore (incumbent)	11,206	78.0
Libertarian	Drew Weingarten	3,157	22.0
Total votes		14,363	100.0
Democratic hold			

=== District 90 ===
The district has been represented by Republican Andrew Ireland since 2024. He was elected with 63.6% of the vote in 2024.

==== Republican primary ====
===== Candidates =====
====== Declared ======
- Andrew Ireland, incumbent state representative

==== General election ====
General election results
Party	Candidate	Votes	%
Democratic	David Boyd	10,362	51.1
Republican	Andrew Ireland (incumbent)	9,914	48.9
Total votes		20,276	100.0
Democratic gain from Republican			

=== District 91 ===
The district has been represented by Republican Robert Behning since 1992. Behning was re-elected with 60.1% of the vote in 2024.

==== Republican primary ====
===== Candidates =====
====== Declared ======
- Robert Behning, incumbent state representative

==== Democratic primary ====
===== Candidates =====
====== Declared ======
- Jarren Hurt

=== General election ===
==== Results ====
General election
Party	Candidate	Votes	%
Democratic	Jarren Hurt	8,096	54.4
Republican	Robert Behning (incumbent)	6,788	45.6
Total votes		14,827	100.0
Democratic gain from Republican			

=== District 92 ===
The district has been represented by Democrat Renee Pack since 2020. Pack was re-elected with 59% of the vote in 2024.

==== Democratic primary ====
===== Candidates =====
====== Declared ======
- Renee Pack, incumbent state representative

=== District 93 ===
The district has been represented by Republican Julie McGuire since 2022. McGuire was elected with 62.2% of the vote in 2024.

==== Republican primary ====
===== Candidates =====
====== Declared ======
- Julie McGuire, incumbent state representative

==== Democratic primary ====
===== Candidates =====
====== Declared ======
- Eva Rosberg

=== General election ===
==== Results ====
General election
Party	Candidate	Votes	%
Democratic	Eva Rosberg	7,440	51.1
Republican	Julie McGuire (incumbent)	7,108	48.9
Total votes		14,548	100.0
Democratic gain from Republican			

=== District 94 ===
The district has been represented by Democrat Cherrish Pryor since 2008. Pryor was re-elected unopposed in 2024.

==== Democratic primary ====
===== Candidates =====
====== Declared ======
- Cherrish Pryor, incumbent state representative
- Andre Sisk Sr.

===== Endorsements =====
Cherrish Pryor

Organizations

- Indiana Farm Bureau AgELECT PAC

==== Results ====
District 94 Democratic primary
Party	Candidate	Votes	%
Democratic	Cherrish Pryor (incumbent)	6,086	89.4
Democratic	Andre Sisk Sr.	719	10.6
Total votes		6,805	100.0

=== District 95 ===
The district has been represented by Democrat John Bartlett since 2008. Bartlett was re-elected unopposed in 2024.

==== Democratic primary ====
===== Candidates =====
====== Declared ======
- John Bartlett, incumbent state representative
- Tyrrell Giles, Lawrence City councilman
- Keith Graves, Indianapolis City-County Indianapolis City-County Council (2019–present)

===== Endorsements =====
John Bartlett

Organizations

- Indiana Farm Bureau AgELECT PAC

==== Results ====
District 95 Democratic primary
Party	Candidate	Votes	%
Democratic	John Bartlett (incumbent)	3,235	51.9
Democratic	Tyrrell Giles	1,792	28.7
Democratic	Keith Graves	1,211	19.4
Total votes		6,238	100.0

=== District 96 ===
The district has been represented by Democrat Greg Porter since 1992. Porter was re-elected unopposed in 2024.

==== Democratic primary ====
===== Candidates =====
====== Declared ======
- Greg Porter, incumbent state representative

===== Endorsements =====
Greg Porter

Organizations

- Indiana Farm Bureau AgELECT PAC

=== District 97 ===
The district has been represented by Democrat Justin Moed since 2012. Moed was re-elected with 58.2% of the vote in 2024.

==== Democratic primary ====
===== Candidates =====
====== Declared ======
- Justin Moed, incumbent state representative
- Sarah Shydale, candidate for this district in 2024

===== Endorsements =====
Justin Moed

Organizations

- Indiana Farm Bureau AgELECT PAC

==== Results ====
District 97 Democratic primary
Party	Candidate	Votes	%
Democratic	Justin Moed (incumbent)	1,820	67.3
Democratic	Sarah Shydale	886	32.8
Total votes		2,706	100.0

==== Libertarian convention ====
===== Candidates =====
====== Nominee ======
- Mark Renholzberger, nominee for this district in 2024 and 2020

==== General election ====
General election results
Party	Candidate	Votes	%
Democratic	Justin Moed (incumbent)	7,971	83.8
Libertarian	Mark Renholzberger	1,539	16.2
Total votes		9,510	100.0
Democratic hold			

=== District 98 ===
The district has been represented by Democrat Robin Shackleford since 2012. Shackleford was re-elected with 81.9% of the vote in 2024.

==== Democratic primary ====
===== Candidates =====
====== Declared ======
- Robin Shackleford, incumbent state representative

=== District 99 ===
The district has been represented by Democrat Vanessa Summers since her appointment in 1991. Summers was re-elected with 81.3% of the vote in 2024.

==== Democratic primary ====
===== Candidates =====
====== Declared ======
- Vanessa Summers, incumbent state representative

=== District 100 ===
The district has been represented by Democrat Blake Johnson since his appointment in 2020. Johnson was re-elected with 71.7% of the vote in 2024.

==== Democratic primary ====
===== Candidates =====
====== Declared ======
- Blake Johnson, incumbent state representative
