= 2020 Indiana House of Representatives election =

- November 3, 2020

All 100 seats in the Indiana House of Representatives 51 seats needed for a majority
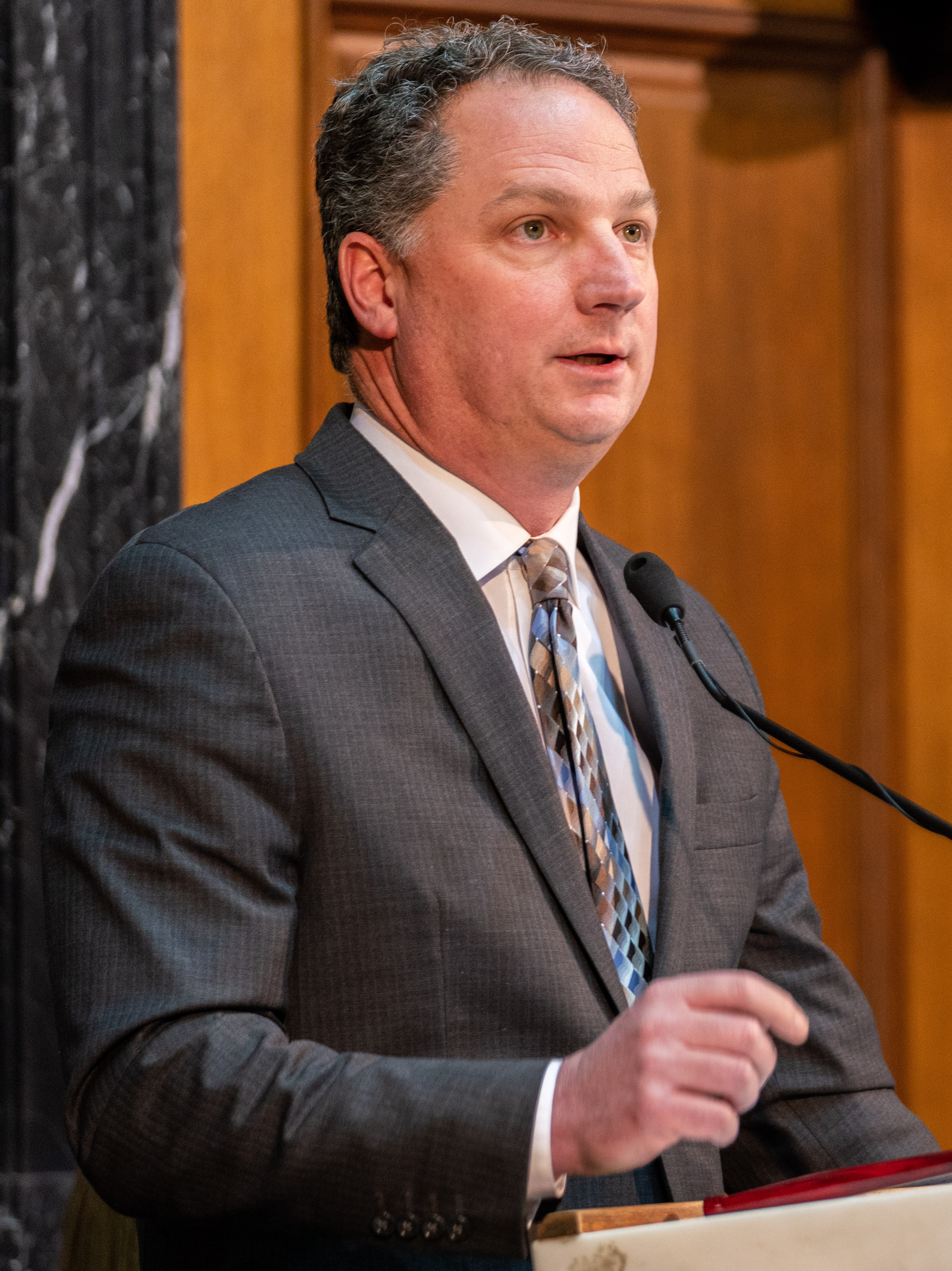

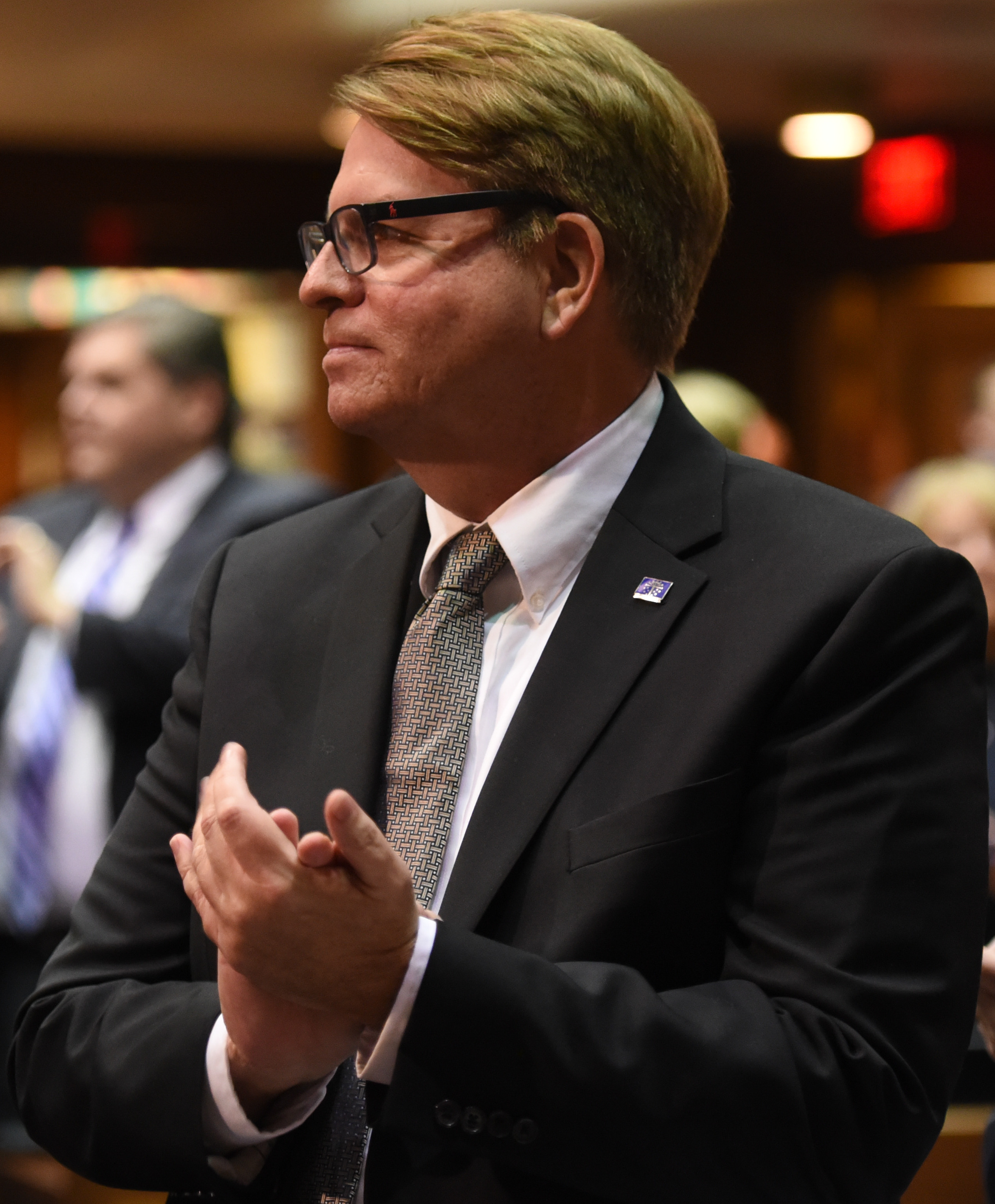
	Majority party	Minority party
Leader	Todd Huston	Phil GiaQuinta
Party	Republican	Democratic
Leader's seat	37th-Fishers	80th-Fort Wayne
Last election	67	33
Seats won	71	29
Seat change	▲4	▼4
Popular vote	1,682,843	1,121,303
Percentage	59.69%	39.77%
- Republican gain Democratic gain Republican hold Democratic hold 50–60% 60–70% 70–80% >90% 50–60% 60–70% 70–80% 80–90% >90%
Speaker before election
Todd Huston
Republican
Elected Speaker
Todd Huston
Republican

The 2020 elections for the Indiana House of Representatives were held on Tuesday, November 3, 2020, to elect representatives from all 100 districts. The primary election occurred on June 2, 2020. The Republican Party has held a House majority since 2010. Indiana legislators assume office on the second Tuesday after the general election.

The elections for the United States President, Indiana's 9 congressional districts, Indiana's Governor race, and the Indiana Senate were held on this date.

== Predictions ==
Source	Ranking	As of
The Cook Political Report	Safe R	October 21, 2020

== Results ==
2020 Indiana State House General Election
Party	Votes	Percentage	% Change	Seats before	Candidates	Seats after	+/–
Republican	1,682,843	59.69%	Steady	67	85	71	▲4
Democratic	1,121,303	39.77%	Steady	34	83	29	▼4
Libertarian	10,875	0.39%	Steady	0	5	0	
Independent	4,186	0.15%	Steady	0	1	0	
Totals	2,819,207	100.00%	—	100	174	100	—

== Elections by district ==
=== District 1 ===
==== Results ====
General Election
Party	Candidate	Votes	%
Democratic	Carolyn Jackson (incumbent)	Unopposed	100.0
Total votes			100.0
Democratic hold			

=== District 2 ===
==== Results ====
General Election
Party	Candidate	Votes	%
Democratic	Earl Harris (incumbent)	Unopposed	100.0
Total votes			100.0
Democratic hold			

=== District 3 ===
==== Results ====
General Election
Party	Candidate	Votes	%
Democratic	Ragen Hatcher (incumbent)	Unopposed	100.0
Total votes			100.0
Democratic hold			

=== District 4 ===
==== Results ====
General Election
Party	Candidate	Votes	%
Republican	Ed Soliday (incumbent)	20,072	54.6
Democratic	Debora Porter	16,704	45.4
Total votes		36,776	100.0
Republican hold			

=== District 5 ===
==== Results ====
General Election
Party	Candidate	Votes	%
Republican	Dale DeVon (incumbent)	14,617	50.7
Democratic	Donald Westerhausen	14,190	49.3
Total votes		28,807	100.0
Republican hold			

=== District 6 ===
Democrat B. Patrick Bauer announced he would be not seek re-election. There were three Democrats running in the primaries including Bauer's daughter, Maureen Bauer.

==== Results ====
General Election
Party	Candidate	Votes	%
Democratic	Maureen Bauer	Unopposed	100
Total votes			100.0
Democratic hold			

=== District 7 ===
==== Results ====
General Election
Party	Candidate	Votes	%
Republican	Jake Teshka	14,668	54.0
Democratic	Ross Deal (incumbent)	12,498	46.0
Total votes		27,166	100.0
Republican gain from Democratic			

=== District 8 ===
==== Results ====
General Election
Party	Candidate	Votes	%
Democratic	Ryan Dvorak (incumbent)	16,554	56.8
Republican	Timothy Jaycox	12,568	43.2
Total votes		29,122	100.0
Democratic hold			

=== District 9 ===
==== Results ====
General Election
Party	Candidate	Votes	%
Democratic	Patricia Boy (incumbent)	15,781	56.6
Republican	Dion Bergeron	12,096	43.4
Total votes		27,877	100.0
Democratic hold			

=== District 10 ===
==== Results ====
General Election
Party	Candidate	Votes	%
Democratic	Charles Moseley (incumbent)	Unopposed	100
Total votes			100.0
Democratic hold			

=== District 11 ===
==== Results ====
General Election
Party	Candidate	Votes	%
Republican	Michael Aylesworth (incumbent)	25,742	68.8
Democratic	Keegan Damron	11,697	31.2
Total votes		37,439	100.0
Republican hold			

=== District 12 ===
Democrat Mara Candelaria Reardon announced she would be not seek re-election in the 12th district leaving the seat open.

==== Results ====
General Election
Party	Candidate	Votes	%
Democratic	Mike Andrade	18,733	57.7
Republican	Tom Wichlinski	13,730	42.3
Total votes		37,439	100.0
Democratic hold			

=== District 13 ===
==== Results ====
General Election
Party	Candidate	Votes	%
Republican	Sharon Negele (incumbent)	22,080	72.8
Democratic	Keegan Damron	8,256	27.2
Total votes		30,336	100.0
Republican hold			

=== District 14 ===
==== Results ====
General Election
Party	Candidate	Votes	%
Democratic	Vernon Smith (incumbent)	Unopposed	100.0
Total votes			100.0
Democratic hold			

=== District 15 ===
==== Results ====
General Election
Party	Candidate	Votes	%
Republican	Hal Slager	17,813	51.5
Democratic	Chris Chyung (incumbent)	16,751	48.5
Total votes		34,564	100.0
Republican gain from Democratic			

=== District 16 ===
==== Results ====
General Election
Party	Candidate	Votes	%
Republican	Douglas Gutwein (incumbent)	21,686	74.1
Democratic	Michael Lovely	7,573	25.9
Total votes		29,259	100.0
Republican hold			

=== District 17 ===
==== Results ====
General Election
Party	Candidate	Votes	%
Republican	Jack Jordan (incumbent)	19,955	74.7
Democratic	Bianka Tinklenberg	6,748	25.3
Total votes		26,703	100.0
Republican hold			

=== District 18 ===
Republican incumbent David Wolkins did not file to run for re-election.

==== Results ====
General Election
Party	Candidate	Votes	%
Republican	Craig Snow	22,637	78.1
Democratic	Chad Harris	6,353	21.9
Total votes		28,990	100.0
Republican hold			

=== District 19 ===
==== Results ====
General Election
Party	Candidate	Votes	%
Republican	Julie Olthoff	19,496	51.8
Democratic	Lisa Beck (incumbent)	18,135	48.2
Total votes		29,259	100.0
Republican gain from Democratic			

=== District 20 ===
==== Results ====
General Election
Party	Candidate	Votes	%
Republican	Jim Pressel (incumbent)	20,028	68.2
Democratic	Tim Gust	9,322	31.8
Total votes		29,350	100.0
Republican hold			

=== District 21 ===
==== Results ====
General Election
Party	Candidate	Votes	%
Republican	Timothy Wesco (incumbent)	15,346	64.5
Democratic	Ryan Liedtky	8,446	35.5
Total votes		29,350	100.0
Republican hold			

=== District 22 ===
==== Results ====
General Election
Party	Candidate	Votes	%
Republican	Curt Nisly (incumbent)	20,694	72.1
Democratic	Kelly Thompson	8,003	27.9
Total votes		28,697	100.0
Republican hold			

=== District 23 ===
==== Results ====
General Election
Party	Candidate	Votes	%
Republican	Ethan Manning (incumbent)	Unopposed	100
Total votes			100.0
Republican hold			

=== District 24 ===
==== Results ====
General Election
Party	Candidate	Votes	%
Republican	Donna Schaibley (incumbent)	30,321	58.1
Democratic	Naomi Bechtold	21,853	41.9
Total votes		52,174	100.0
Republican hold			

=== District 25 ===
==== Results ====
General Election
Party	Candidate	Votes	%
Republican	Donald Lehe (incumbent)	22,475	70.3
Democratic	Naomi Bechtold	9,500	29.7
Total votes		31,975	100.0
Republican hold			

=== District 26 ===
==== Results ====
General Election
Party	Candidate	Votes	%
Democratic	Chris Campbell (incumbent)	Unopposed	100
Total votes			100.0
Democratic hold			

=== District 27 ===
==== Results ====
General Election
Party	Candidate	Votes	%
Democratic	Sheila Klinker (incumbent)	14,631	62.1
Republican	James Hass	8,934	37.9
Total votes		31,975	100.0
Democratic hold			

=== District 28 ===
==== Results ====
General Election
Party	Candidate	Votes	%
Republican	Jeff Thompson (incumbent)	27,826	71.5
Democratic	Eric Shotwell	11,075	28.5
Total votes		31,975	100.0
Republican hold			

=== District 29 ===
==== Results ====
General Election
Party	Candidate	Votes	%
Republican	Chuck Goodrich (incumbent)	27,618	66.0
Democratic	Mike Vick	14,228	34.0
Total votes		41,846	100.0
Republican hold			

=== District 30 ===
==== Results ====
General Election
Party	Candidate	Votes	%
Republican	Mike Karickhoff (incumbent)	19,226	66.1
Democratic	Dylan McHenry	9,839	33.9
Total votes		29,065	100.0
Republican hold			

=== District 31 ===
==== Results ====
General Election
Party	Candidate	Votes	%
Republican	Ann Vermilion (incumbent)	Unopposed	100
Total votes			100.0
Republican hold			

=== District 32 ===
==== Results ====
General Election
Party	Candidate	Votes	%
Republican	Anthony Cook (incumbent)	26,430	75.4
Democratic	Amie Neiling	8,615	24.6
Total votes		35,045	100.0
Republican hold			

=== District 33 ===
==== Results ====
General Election
Party	Candidate	Votes	%
Republican	John Prescott (incumbent)	20,198	72.5
Democratic	Amie Neiling	7,649	27.5
Total votes		27,847	100.0
Republican hold			

=== District 34 ===
==== Results ====
General Election
Party	Candidate	Votes	%
Democratic	Sue Errington (incumbent)	11,293	56.4
Republican	Dale Basham	8,744	43.6
Total votes		20,037	100.0
Democratic hold			

=== District 35 ===
==== Results ====
General Election
Party	Candidate	Votes	%
Republican	Elizabeth Rowray	16,767	55.3
Democratic	Melanie Wright (incumbent)	13,570	44.7
Total votes		30,337	100.0
Republican gain from Democratic			

=== District 36 ===
==== Results ====
General Election
Party	Candidate	Votes	%
Democratic	Terri Austin (incumbent)	12,951	53.0
Republican	Kyle Pierce	11,485	47.0
Total votes		24,436	100.0
Democratic hold			

=== District 37 ===
==== Results ====
General Election
Party	Candidate	Votes	%
Republican	Todd Huston (incumbent)	24,591	56.2
Democratic	Aimee Cole	19,159	43.8
Total votes		43,750	100.0
Republican hold			

=== District 38 ===
==== Results ====
General Election
Party	Candidate	Votes	%
Republican	Heath VanNatter (incumbent)	20,746	71.5
Democratic	Tom Hedde	8,272	28.5
Total votes		29,018	100.0
Republican hold			

=== District 39 ===
==== Results ====
General Election
Party	Candidate	Votes	%
Republican	Jerry Torr (incumbent)	23,396	53.6
Democratic	Ashley Klein	20,262	46.4
Total votes		43,658	100.0
Republican hold			

=== District 40 ===
==== Results ====
General Election
Party	Candidate	Votes	%
Republican	Gregory Steuerwald (incumbent)	24,004	60.0
Democratic	Kevin Short	15,974	40.0
Total votes		39,978	100.0
Republican hold			

=== District 41 ===
==== Results ====
General Election
Party	Candidate	Votes	%
Republican	Tim Brown (incumbent)	22,639	75.3
Democratic	Greg Woods	7,407	24.7
Total votes		30,046	100.0
Republican hold			

=== District 42 ===
==== Results ====
General Election
Party	Candidate	Votes	%
Republican	Alan Morrison (incumbent)	18,945	66.8
Democratic	Amy Adams	9,421	33.2
Total votes		28,366	100.0
Republican hold			

=== District 43 ===
==== Results ====
General Election
Party	Candidate	Votes	%
Democratic	Tonya Pfaff (incumbent)	13,172	57.5
Republican	Bill Treadway	9,722	42.5
Total votes		22,894	100.0
Republican hold			

=== District 44 ===
==== Results ====
General Election
Party	Candidate	Votes	%
Republican	Beau Baird (incumbent)	Unopposed	100
Total votes			100.0
Republican hold			

=== District 45 ===
==== Results ====
General Election
Party	Candidate	Votes	%
Republican	Bruce Borders (incumbent)	Unopposed	100
Total votes			100.0
Republican hold			

=== District 46 ===
==== Results ====
General Election
Party	Candidate	Votes	%
Republican	Bob Heaton (incumbent)	Unopposed	100
Total votes			100.0
Republican hold			

=== District 47 ===
==== Results ====
General Election
Party	Candidate	Votes	%
Republican	John Young (incumbent)	Unopposed	100
Total votes			100.0
Republican hold			

=== District 48 ===
==== Results ====
General Election
Party	Candidate	Votes	%
Republican	Doug Miller (incumbent)	16,430	64.3
Democratic	Aaron Mishler	9,105	35.7
Total votes		25,535	100.0
Republican hold			

=== District 49 ===
==== Results ====
General Election
Party	Candidate	Votes	%
Republican	Christy Stutzman (incumbent)	16,539	66.5
Democratic	Amanda Qualls	8,341	33.5
Total votes		24,880	100.0
Republican hold			

=== District 50 ===
==== Results ====
General Election
Party	Candidate	Votes	%
Republican	Dan Leonard (incumbent)	21,418	71.5
Democratic	Jorge Fernandez	8,517	28.5
Total votes		29,935	100.0
Republican hold			

=== District 51 ===
==== Results ====
General Election
Party	Candidate	Votes	%
Republican	Dennis Zent (incumbent)	17,633	77.1
Democratic	Michael Stephenson	5,250	22.9
Total votes		22,883	100.0
Republican hold			

=== District 52 ===
==== Results ====
General Election
Party	Candidate	Votes	%
Republican	Ben Smaltz (incumbent)	24,713	72.0
Democratic	Martha Lemert	8,322	24.3
Libertarian	Morgan Rigg	1,271	3.7
Total votes		34,306	100.0
Republican hold			

=== District 53 ===
==== Results ====
General Election
Party	Candidate	Votes	%
Republican	Robert Cherry (incumbent)	Unopposed	100
Total votes			100.0
Republican hold			

=== District 54 ===
==== Results ====
General Election
Party	Candidate	Votes	%
Republican	Tom Saunders (incumbent)	Unopposed	100
Total votes			100.0
Republican hold			

=== District 55 ===
==== Results ====
General Election
Party	Candidate	Votes	%
Republican	Cindy Ziemke (incumbent)	Unopposed	100
Total votes			100.0
Republican hold			

=== District 56 ===
==== Results ====
General Election
Party	Candidate	Votes	%
Republican	Brad Barrett (incumbent)	Unopposed	100
Total votes			100.0
Republican hold			

=== District 57 ===
==== Results ====
General Election
Party	Candidate	Votes	%
Republican	Sean Eberhart (incumbent)	Unopposed	100
Total votes			100.0
Republican hold			

=== District 58 ===
Republican Charles "Woody" Burton retired after being in office since 1988. His retirement left the seat open in this election.

==== Results ====
General Election
Party	Candidate	Votes	%
Republican	Michelle Davis	22,282	67.6
Democratic	Cindy Reinert	10,664	32.4
Total votes		32,946	100.0
Republican hold			

=== District 59 ===
==== Results ====
General Election
Party	Candidate	Votes	%
Republican	Ryan Lauer (incumbent)	17,729	59.9
Democratic	Dale Nowlin	11,873	40.1
Total votes		29,602	100.0
Republican hold			

=== District 60 ===
==== Results ====
General Election
Party	Candidate	Votes	%
Republican	Peggy Mayfield (incumbent)	21,712	63.5
Democratic	Tiffany Grant	12,484	36.5
Total votes		34,196	100.0
Republican hold			

=== District 61 ===
==== Results ====
General Election
Party	Candidate	Votes	%
Democratic	Matt Pierce (incumbent) (incumbent)	Unopposed	100
Total votes			100.0
Democratic hold			

=== District 62 ===
==== Results ====
General Election
Party	Candidate	Votes	%
Republican	Jeff Ellington (incumbent)	19,036	60.4
Democratic	Alyssa Bailey	12,468	39.6
Total votes		31,504	100.0
Republican hold			

=== District 63 ===
==== Results ====
General Election
Party	Candidate	Votes	%
Republican	Shane Lindauer (incumbent)	21,494	73.8
Democratic	Teresa Kendall	7,626	26.2
Total votes		29,120	100.0
Republican hold			

=== District 64 ===
==== Results ====
General Election
Party	Candidate	Votes	%
Republican	Matt Hostettler (incumbent)	25,191	75.9
Democratic	Ian Gamroth	7,986	24.1
Total votes		33,177	100.0
Republican hold			

=== District 65 ===
==== Results ====
General Election
Party	Candidate	Votes	%
Republican	Chris May (incumbent)	23,721	72.9
Democratic	Ian Gamroth	8,803	27.1
Total votes		32,524	100.0
Republican hold			

=== District 66 ===
==== Results ====
General Election
Party	Candidate	Votes	%
Republican	Zach Payne	16,585	55.8
Democratic	Terry Goodin (incumbent)	13,160	44.2
Total votes		29,745	100.0
Republican gain from Democratic			

=== District 67 ===
==== Results ====
General Election
Party	Candidate	Votes	%
Republican	Randy Frye (incumbent)	Unopposed	100
Total votes			100.0
Republican hold			

=== District 68 ===
==== Results ====
General Election
Party	Candidate	Votes	%
Republican	Randy Lyness (incumbent)	Unopposed	100
Total votes			100.0
Republican hold			

=== District 69 ===
==== Results ====
General Election
Party	Candidate	Votes	%
Republican	Jim Lucas (incumbent)	18,784	67.3
Democratic	Jeffery Prewitt	4,924	17.7
Independent	Katrina Hardwick	4,186	15.0
Total votes		27,894	100.0
Republican hold			

=== District 70 ===
==== Results ====
General Election
Party	Candidate	Votes	%
Republican	Karen Engleman (incumbent)	25,166	70.7
Democratic	Kent Yeager	10,437	29.3
Total votes		35,603	100.0
Republican hold			

=== District 71 ===
==== Results ====
General Election
Party	Candidate	Votes	%
Democratic	Rita Fleming (incumbent)	19,167	77.6
Libertarian	Russell Brooksbank	5,523	22.4
Total votes		24,690	100.0
Democratic hold			

=== District 72 ===
==== Results ====
General Election
Party	Candidate	Votes	%
Republican	Edward Clere (incumbent)	20,850	59.4
Democratic	Erica Lawrence	14,275	40.6
Total votes		35,125	100.0
Republican hold			

=== District 73 ===
==== Results ====
General Election
Party	Candidate	Votes	%
Republican	Steve Davisson (incumbent)	Unopposed	100
Total votes			100.0
Republican hold			

=== District 74 ===
==== Results ====
General Election
Party	Candidate	Votes	%
Republican	Stephen Bartels (incumbent)	Unopposed	100
Total votes			100.0
Republican hold			

=== District 75 ===
Republican Ron Bacon did not file for re-election leaving his seat open.

==== Results ====
General Election
Party	Candidate	Votes	%
Republican	Cindy Ledbetter	20,945	61.2
Democratic	John Hurley	13,306	38.8
Total votes		34,251	100.0
Republican hold			

=== District 76 ===
==== Results ====
General Election
Party	Candidate	Votes	%
Republican	Wendy McNamara (incumbent)	18,507	64.0
Democratic	Stephen Folz	10,391	36.0
Total votes		28,898	100.0
Republican hold			

=== District 77 ===
==== Results ====
General Election
Party	Candidate	Votes	%
Democratic	Ryan Hatfield (incumbent)	13,695	63.2
Republican	Gregory Peete	7,975	36.8
Total votes		21,670	100.0
Democratic hold			

=== District 78 ===
==== Results ====
General Election
Party	Candidate	Votes	%
Republican	Holli Sullivan (incumbent)	20,273	63.9
Democratic	Tonda Pauley	11,453	36.1
Total votes		31,726	100.0
Republican hold			

=== District 79 ===
==== Results ====
General Election
Party	Candidate	Votes	%
Republican	Matt Lehman (incumbent)	Unopposed	100
Total votes			100.0
Republican hold			

=== District 80 ===
==== Results ====
General Election
Party	Candidate	Votes	%
Democratic	Phil GiaQuinta (incumbent)	Unopposed	100
Total votes			100.0
Democratic hold			

=== District 81 ===
==== Results ====
General Election
Party	Candidate	Votes	%
Republican	Martin Carbaugh (incumbent)	13,725	52.0
Democratic	Kyle Miller	12,653	48.0
Total votes		26,378	100.0
Republican hold			

=== District 82 ===
==== Results ====
General Election
Party	Candidate	Votes	%
Republican	David Abbott (incumbent)	Unopposed	100
Total votes			100.0
Republican hold			

=== District 83 ===
==== Results ====
General Election
Party	Candidate	Votes	%
Republican	Christopher Judy (incumbent)	24,783	64.7
Democratic	Michael Bienz	11,953	31.2
Libertarian	Jason Eicholtz	1,578	4.1
Total votes		38,314	100.0
Republican hold			

=== District 84 ===
==== Results ====
General Election
Party	Candidate	Votes	%
Republican	Bob Morris (incumbent)	21,482	61.1
Democratic	Emma Steele	13,670	38.9
Total votes		35,152	100.0
Republican hold			

=== District 85 ===
==== Results ====
General Election
Party	Candidate	Votes	%
Republican	Dave Heine (incumbent)	21,238	71.8
Democratic	Pablo Hurtado	8,332	28.2
Total votes		29,570	100.0
Republican hold			

=== District 86 ===
==== Results ====
General Election
Party	Candidate	Votes	%
Democratic	Ed DeLaney (incumbent)	27,901	70.0
Republican	Paul Tinkle	11,930	30.0
Total votes		39,831	100.0
Democratic hold			

=== District 87 ===
==== Results ====
General Election
Party	Candidate	Votes	%
Democratic	Carey Hamilton (incumbent)	22,729	62.7
Republican	Ryan Royer	13,549	37.3
Total votes		36,278	100.0
Democratic hold			

=== District 88 ===
==== Results ====
General Election
Party	Candidate	Votes	%
Republican	Chris Jeter (incumbent)	26,659	59.3
Democratic	Pam Dechert	18,285	40.7
Total votes		44,944	100.0
Republican hold			

=== District 89 ===
==== Results ====
General Election
Party	Candidate	Votes	%
Democratic	Mitch Gore	13,898	51.3
Republican	Cynthia Kirchhofer (incumbent)	13,173	48.7
Total votes		27,071	100.0
Democratic gain from Republican			

=== District 90 ===
==== Results ====
General Election
Party	Candidate	Votes	%
Republican	Mike Speedy (incumbent)	22,311	63.9
Democratic	Jordan Nienaber	12,584	36.1
Total votes		34,895	100.0
Republican hold			

=== District 91 ===
==== Results ====
General Election
Party	Candidate	Votes	%
Republican	Robert Behning (incumbent)	16,113	59.5
Democratic	Beverly McDermott-Piazza	9,300	34.3
Libertarian	Crystal Henry	1,687	6.2
Total votes		27,100	100.0
Republican hold			

=== District 92 ===
Democrat Karlee Macer did not seek re-election.

==== Results ====
General Election
Party	Candidate	Votes	%
Democratic	Renee Pack	Unopposed	100
Total votes			100.0
Democratic hold			

=== District 93 ===
Republican incumbent Dollyne Sherman lost in the primaries to John Jacob.

==== Results ====
General Election
Party	Candidate	Votes	%
Republican	John Jacob	18,485	61.0
Democratic	Angela Elliott	11,806	39.0
Total votes		30,291	100.0
Republican hold			

=== District 94 ===
==== Results ====
General Election
Party	Candidate	Votes	%
Democratic	Cherrish Pryor	21,430	85.5
Republican	Angela Elliott	3,629	14.5
Total votes		25,059	100.0
Democratic hold			

=== District 95 ===
==== Results ====
General Election
Party	Candidate	Votes	%
Democratic	John Bartlett	Unopposed	100
Total votes			100.0
Democratic hold			

=== District 96 ===
==== Results ====
General Election
Party	Candidate	Votes	%
Democratic	Greg Porter	Unopposed	100
Total votes			100.0
Democratic hold			

=== District 97 ===
==== Results ====
General Election
Party	Candidate	Votes	%
Democratic	Justin Moed (incumbent)	9,707	55.5
Republican	John Schmitz	6,962	39.8
Libertarian	Mark Renholzberger	816	4.7
Total votes		17,485	100.0
Democratic hold			

=== District 98 ===
==== Results ====
General Election
Party	Candidate	Votes	%
Democratic	Robin Shackleford	Unopposed	100
Total votes			100.0
Democratic hold			

=== District 99 ===
==== Results ====
General Election
Party	Candidate	Votes	%
Democratic	Vanessa Summers	Unopposed	100
Total votes			100.0
Democratic hold			

=== District 100 ===
==== Results ====
General Election
Party	Candidate	Votes	%
Democratic	Blake Johnson (incumbent)	16,353	67.0
Republican	Wayne Harmon	8,037	33.0
Total votes		24,390	100.0
Democratic hold			
