= Steuerwald =

Steuerwald is a German toponymic surname for a person from Hanover. Notable people with the surname include:

- Greg Steuerwald (born 1952), American politician
- Markus Steuerwald (born 1989), German volleyball player
