= Jerry Torr =

American politician (born 1957)

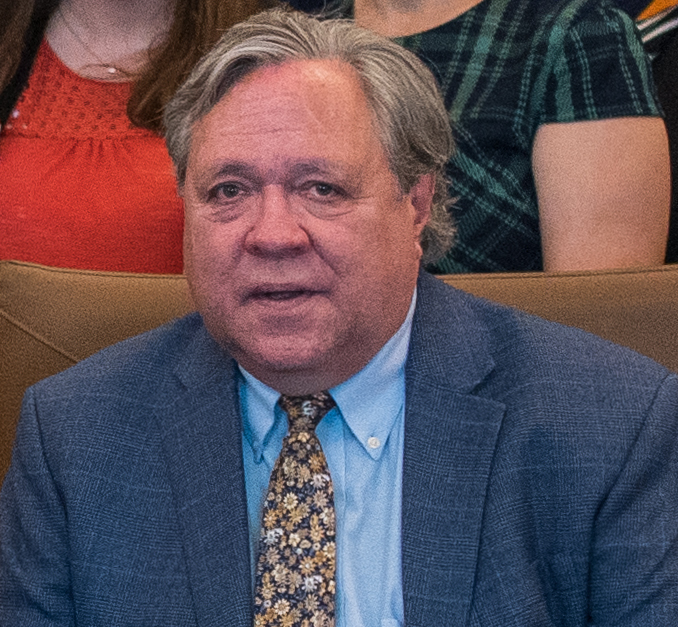

Member of the Indiana House of Representatives from the 39th district
- In office November 19, 1996 – November 18, 2024
- Preceded by: Katherine Willing
- Succeeded by: Danny Lopez

Personal details
- Born: Gerald R. Torr; November 28, 1957 (age 68) Greencastle, Indiana, U.S.
- Party: Republican
- Spouse: Stephanie
- Education: Musicians Institute; Hanover College

Gerald R. Torr (born November 28, 1957) is an American politician. He was a member of the Indiana House of Representatives from the 39th District, serving from 1996 to 2024. He is a member of the Republican Party. In 2023, Torr announced he would not be running for another term.

Rep. Jerry Torr and one other Republican representative joined all 28 Democrats present in voting against an Indiana bill to ban transgender healthcare for children.

== Electoral history ==
Indiana House of Representatives 39th District: Results 1996–2022
Year	Democratic	Votes	%	Republican	Votes	%	Third Party	Party	Votes	%
1996	No candidate			Jerry Torr	21,451	89.5%	Mark R. Struble	Independent	2,508	10.5%
1998	No candidate			Jerry Torr	17,687	100.0%				
2000	No candidate			Jerry Torr	26,428	100.0%				
2002	No candidate			Jerry Torr	12,703	100.0%				
2004	Alvin E. Skoog Jr.	7,217	22.6%	Jerry Torr	24,685	77.4%				
2006	Alvin E. Skoog Jr.	5,140	27.8%	Jerry Torr	13,359	72.2%				
2008	Alvin E. Skoog Jr.	10,599	29.1%	Jerry Torr	25,789	70.9%				
2010	No candidate			Jerry Torr	20,595	100.0%				
2012	No candidate			Jerry Torr	26,432	90.2%	John Strinka	Socialist	2,862	9.8%
2014	David Russ	4,012	26.8%	Jerry Torr	10,978	73.2%				
2016	David Russ	12,640	34.9%	Jerry Torr	23,591	65.1%				
2018	Mark Hinton	14,207	43.0%	Jerry Torr	18,861	57.0%				
2020	Ashley Klein	20,262	46.4%	Jerry Torr	23,396	53.6%				
2022	Matt McNally	13,430	47.6%	Jerry Torr	14,757	52.4%				
