= Rhonda Rhoads =

American politician

Member of the Indiana House of Representatives from the 70th district
- In office November 16, 2010 – November 22, 2016
- Preceded by: Paul J. Robertson
- Succeeded by: Karen Engleman

Personal details
- Born: October 12, 1950 (age 75) Harrison County, Indiana, U.S.
- Party: Republican

Rhonda Rhoads (born October 12, 1950) is an American politician who served in the Indiana House of Representatives from the 70th district from 2010 to 2016.
