= Michael Murphy (Indiana politician) =

American politician

Member of the Indiana House of Representatives from the 90th district
- In office November 9, 1994 – November 3, 2010
- Preceded by: George Edward McKee Schmid
- Succeeded by: Mike Speedy

Personal details
- Born: Michael Brendan Murphy; February 16, 1957 (age 69) South Bend, Indiana
- Party: Republican
- Children: 2
- Education: University of Notre Dame (BA); Indiana University (MA)

Michael Brendan Murphy (born February 16, 1957) served as a Republican member of the Indiana House of Representatives, representing the 90th District from 1994 to 2010. A conservative, Murphy was known for his speeches on behalf of free markets, adherence to the 10th Amendment, and elimination of government regulation. Murphy authored the most sweeping de-regulation of the telecommunications industry (2006) for its time. His bill was signed into law by Governor Mitch Daniels. Murphy also led the effort to cut the Indiana Inheritance Tax in half, and authored an amendment to the Indiana Constitution (Article 5, Section 10), which set up a succession order in Indiana state government. The citizens of Indiana approved the amendment in the November, 2004 election.

Murphy may be best known for his defense of the rights of immigrants to constitutional and humane treatment. In 2006, he gave a speech against HB1383, which among other things, sought to deny some immigrants even emergency medical care. The bill was overwhelmingly defeated.

Murphy was nominated in 2007 for the John F. Kennedy Profile in Courage Award. From January, 2004 to February, 2007, Murphy served as Chairman of the Republican Party for Marion County (Indianapolis) Indiana.

In 2010, Mike Murphy ran for the 2010 Republican nomination to Indiana's 5th congressional district seat then held by Dan Burton. Murphy lost his 2010 bid for Congress in Indiana's 5th District. He came in 4th in the 7-way race, receiving 9,805 votes (approx. 9% of the vote)

In 2015, Murphy was a major fundraiser for Jeb Bush's presidential campaign. He continues to be a major fundraiser and advisor to Republican candidates across Indiana.

Murphy published his first non-fiction book: "The Kimberlins Go To War: A Union Family in Copperhead Country", on October 21, 2016. The book was published in hardcover by the Indiana Historical Society Press.
