= Danny Lopez (politician) =

American politician

Member of the Indiana House of Representatives from the 39th district
- In office November 19, 2024 – November 4, 2026
- Preceded by: Jerry Torr
- Succeeded by: Lindsay Gramlich

Personal details
- Party: Republican
- Education: Florida International University (BA); Georgia State University (MA)

Danny Lopez (born 1979) is an American politician who formerly served as a member of the Indiana House of Representatives from the 39th district. Lopez lost reelection in the 2026 Indiana House of Representatives election to Lindsay Gramlich.

== Career ==
Lopez held various roles in government prior to his election as a representative. He served as a special assistant to then-governor Mike Pence, state director for U.S. Senator Dan Coats, chief of staff for then-lieutenant governor Eric Holcomb, and deputy chief of staff for governor Holcomb. He works as the vice president for external affairs and corporate communications at Pacers Sports & Entertainment.

== Personal life ==
Lopez is married to Sofia and live in Carmel with their two kids.
