= Mike Speedy =

American politician (born 1968)

Member of the Indiana House of Representatives from the 90th district
- In office 2010 – November 18, 2024
- Preceded by: Michael Murphy
- Succeeded by: Andrew Ireland

Member of the Indianapolis City-County Council from the 24th district
- In office 2004–2010
- Preceded by: Beulah Coughenhour
- Succeeded by: Jack Sandlin

Personal details
- Born: August 15, 1968 (age 58) Indianapolis, Indiana, U.S.
- Party: Republican
- Spouse: Amy
- Children: 3
- Education: Indiana University, Bloomington (BS); Indiana University, Indianapolis (JD)

Mike Speedy (born August 15, 1968) is a Republican state politician. In 2024, he was appointed by Governor Mike Braun to be the Secretary of Business Affairs for the state of Indiana. He is a former member of the Indiana House of Representatives representing the 90th district from 2010 to 2024. He previously served as an Indianapolis City Councilman for the 24th district from 2004 to 2010. The American Conservative Union has given him a lifetime Legislature score of 90%. He earned a BS from the Kelley School of Business and a JD from the Indiana University Robert H. McKinney School of Law. In 2024, Speedy announced he was running for the United States House of Representatives in Indiana's 6th congressional district after Greg Pence announced he would not seek re-election. He lost the primary election to former Indianapolis city councilor Jefferson Shreve.

== Political positions ==
=== Abortion ===
Speedy does not support abortion in most circumstances, and has voted against exceptions for rape and incest.
