= Randy Novak =

American politician (born 1959 or 1960)

Member of the Indiana House of Representatives from the 9th district
- Incumbent
- Assumed office October 22, 2025
- Preceded by: Pat Boy

Personal details
- Born: 1959 or 1960 (age 65–66)
- Party: Democratic
- Children: 2
- Education: Rogers High School, Ivy Tech Community College, Purdue North Central, and University of Georgia

Randy Novak (born 1959–1960) is an American politician, former fire chief and realtor who is currently serving as a Democratic member of the Indiana House of Representatives, representing the 9th district. He was sworn into the seat on October 22, 2025, following the resignation of representative Pat Boy.

== Personal life and career ==
Novak graduated from Rogers High School and attended multiple colleges, including Ivy Tech, Purdue North Central and the University of Georgia. He is married and has 2 children. Novak was appointed as the fire chief of Michigan City in June 2015, later retiring in 2020. He previously served on the LaPorte County Council, including as president of the council. He was elected to the State House unopposed in a caucus of Democratic committee members in LaPorte and Porter counties.

== Political views ==
=== Redistricting ===
After his election to the seat in October 2025, Novak publicly came out against the 2025 redistricting effort in the state.
