= Robert Behning =

American politician from Indiana

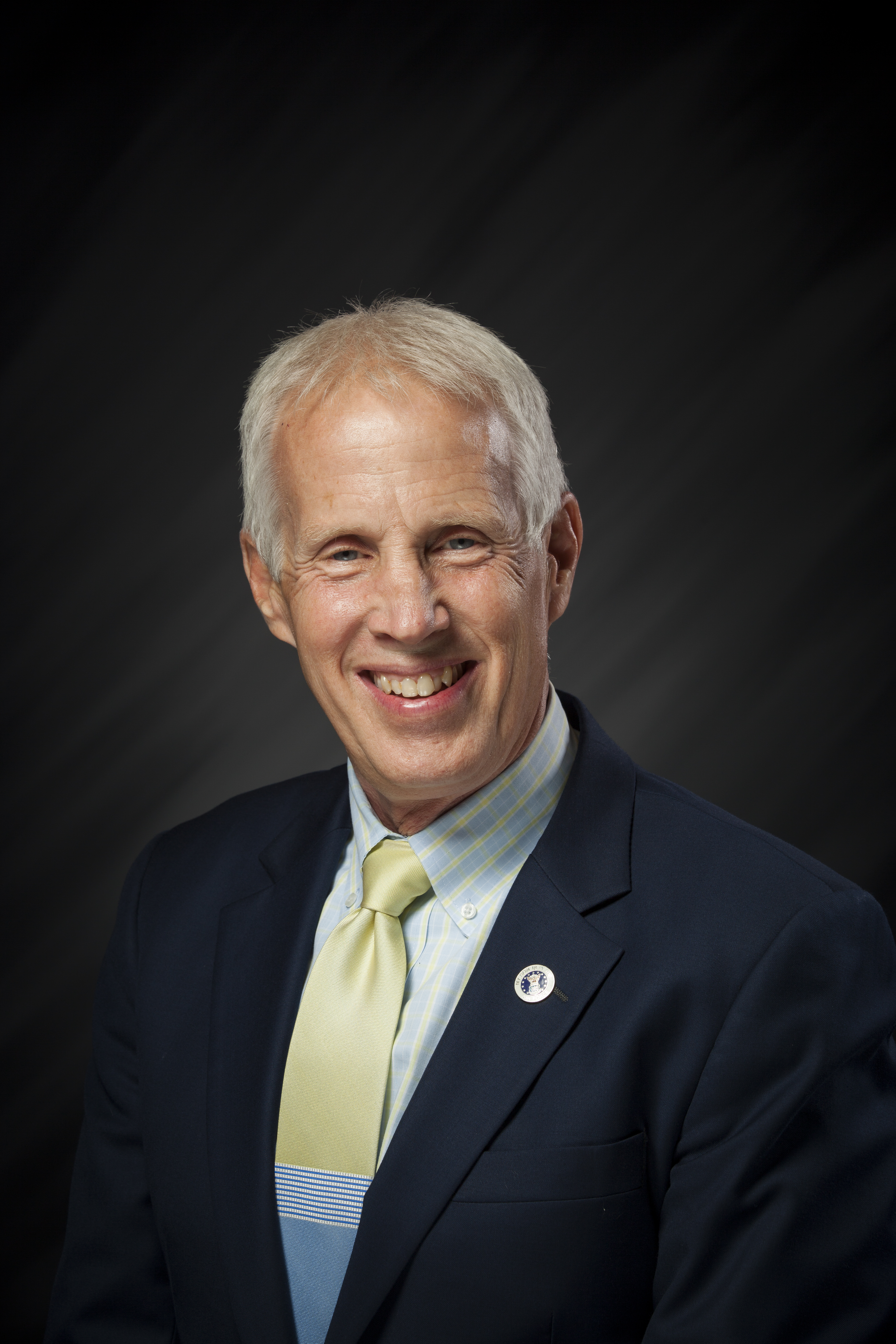

Member of the Indiana House of Representatives from the 91st district
- In office November 17, 1992 – November 4, 2026
- Preceded by: Constituency established
- Succeeded by: Jarren Hurt

Personal details
- Born: January 18, 1954 (age 72) Indianapolis, Indiana
- Party: Republican
- Spouse: Rosalie
- Children: 3
- Education: Indiana University (BS)

Robert William Behning is a Republican member of the Indiana House of Representatives. He represents House District 91, which includes portions of Marion and Hendricks counties. He was born and raised in Indianapolis. In 1976, he received a Bachelor of Science degree from Indiana University.

In 2011, Behning authored legislation creating the School Choice Scholarship program, providing families who do not have the financial means to pay the cost of tuition at a private school with a scholarship (or voucher).

Behning currently works at Marian University as the Director of External Affairs for the Educators College. He is married to Rosalie.

Behning lost reelection to Jarren Hurt in the 2026 Indiana House of Representatives election.
