= 2012 Indiana elections =

Indiana elections, 2012
- November 6, 2012

This is a list of elections held in 2012 in the U.S. state of Indiana:

- United States presidential election in Indiana, 2012
- United States Senate election in Indiana, 2012
- United States House of Representatives elections in Indiana, 2012
- Indiana gubernatorial election, 2012
