= Greg Steuerwald =

American politician and attorney from Indiana

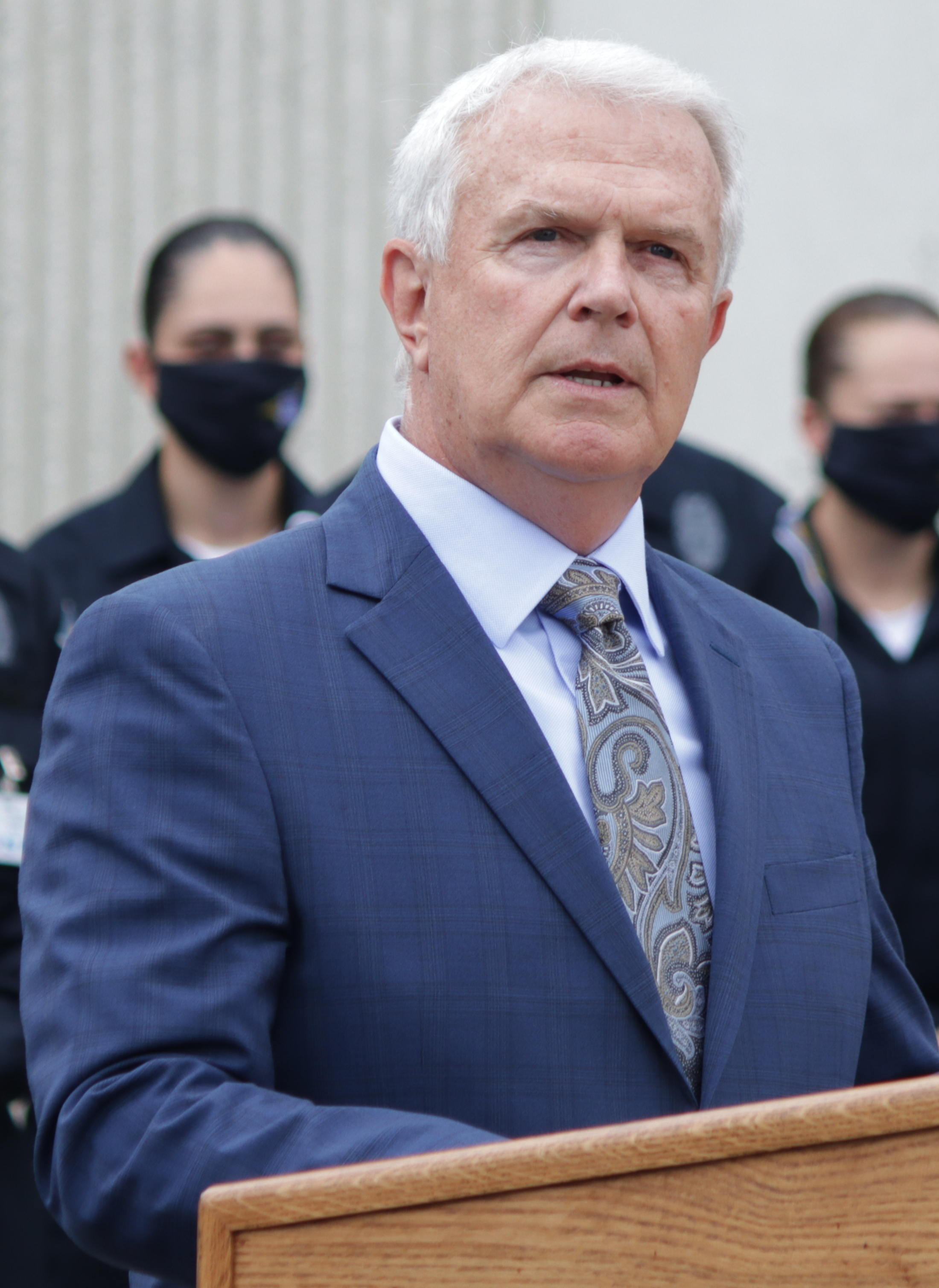

Member of the Indiana House of Representatives from the 40th district
- In office August 19, 2007 – November 3, 2026
- Preceded by: Matt Whetstone

Personal details
- Born: September 12, 1952 (age 74) Terre Haute, Indiana
- Party: Republican
- Occupation: Attorney, politician

Greg Steuerwald (born September 12, 1952) is an American politician and attorney from Indiana. Steuerwald is a member of the Indiana House of Representatives from the 40th district since 2007.

Steuerwald lost reelection to Democrat William Colteryahn in the November 3, 2026 general election.
