= Andrew Ireland (politician) =

American politician

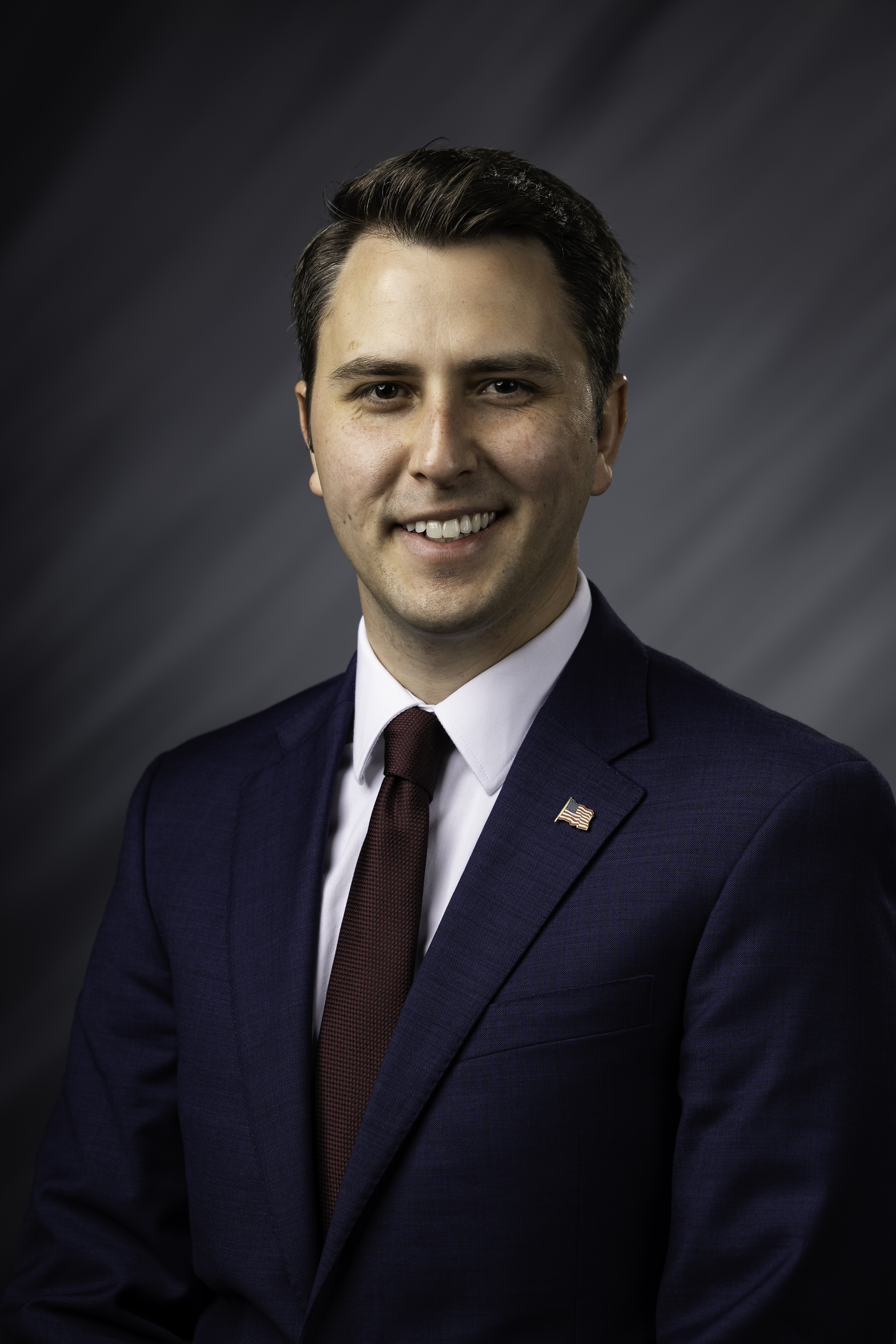
- Official portrait

Member of the Indiana House of Representatives from the 90th district
- In office November 19, 2024 – November 4, 2026
- Preceded by: Mike Speedy
- Succeeded by: David Boyd

Personal details
- Born: January 30, 1995 (age 31) Indiana, U.S.
- Party: Republican
- Spouse: Maddie
- Education: Indiana University, Bloomington (BA, JD); Sungkyunkwan University (MBA)
- Website: House website Campaign website

Andrew Ireland is an American politician and attorney who formerly served as a member of the Indiana House of Representatives from the 90th district. He assumed office on November 19, 2024. He is currently the youngest member of the Indiana General Assembly.

== Early life and education ==
Ireland earned his law and bachelor's degrees from Indiana University and his MBA from Sungkyunkwan University.

== Early career ==
Ireland is a practicing attorney and previously served as a deputy attorney general for Indiana under Todd Rokita until 2022.

== Indiana House of Representatives ==
=== Tenure ===
Ireland was sworn in as a member of the Indiana House of Representatives in November 2024. He has authored bills to enhance criminal sentences for illegal immigrants, reduce homestead property taxes. Ireland also sponsored bills to ban government funding of obscene performances and heighten the penalties for swatting.

Ireland lost his bid for reelection to Democrat David Lawrence Boyd in the November 3, 2026, general election.

== Personal life ==
Ireland is married to Maddie, lives in Franklin Township and attends Indian Creek Christian Church.

== Electoral history ==
=== 2024 ===
Republican primary
Party	Candidate	Votes	%
Republican	Andrew Ireland	2,382	38.2
Republican	Elizabeth Williams	2,299	36.7
Republican	Tim McVey	1,211	19.3
Republican	David Waters	361	5.8
Total votes		6,263	100.0

General election
Party	Candidate	Votes	%
Republican	Andrew Ireland	19,450	63.6
Democratic	Dominique Davie	11,124	36.4
Total votes		30,574	100.0
Republican hold			

=== 2026 ===
Republican primary, May 5, 2026
Party	Candidate	Votes	%
Republican	Andrew Ireland (incumbent)	2,208	100.0
Total votes		2,208	100.0

General election, November 3, 2026 (unofficial results)
Party	Candidate	Votes	%
Democratic	David Lawrence Boyd	10,362	51.1
Republican	Andrew Ireland (incumbent)	9,914	48.9
Total votes		20,276	100.0
