= Edward Clere =

American politician from Indiana

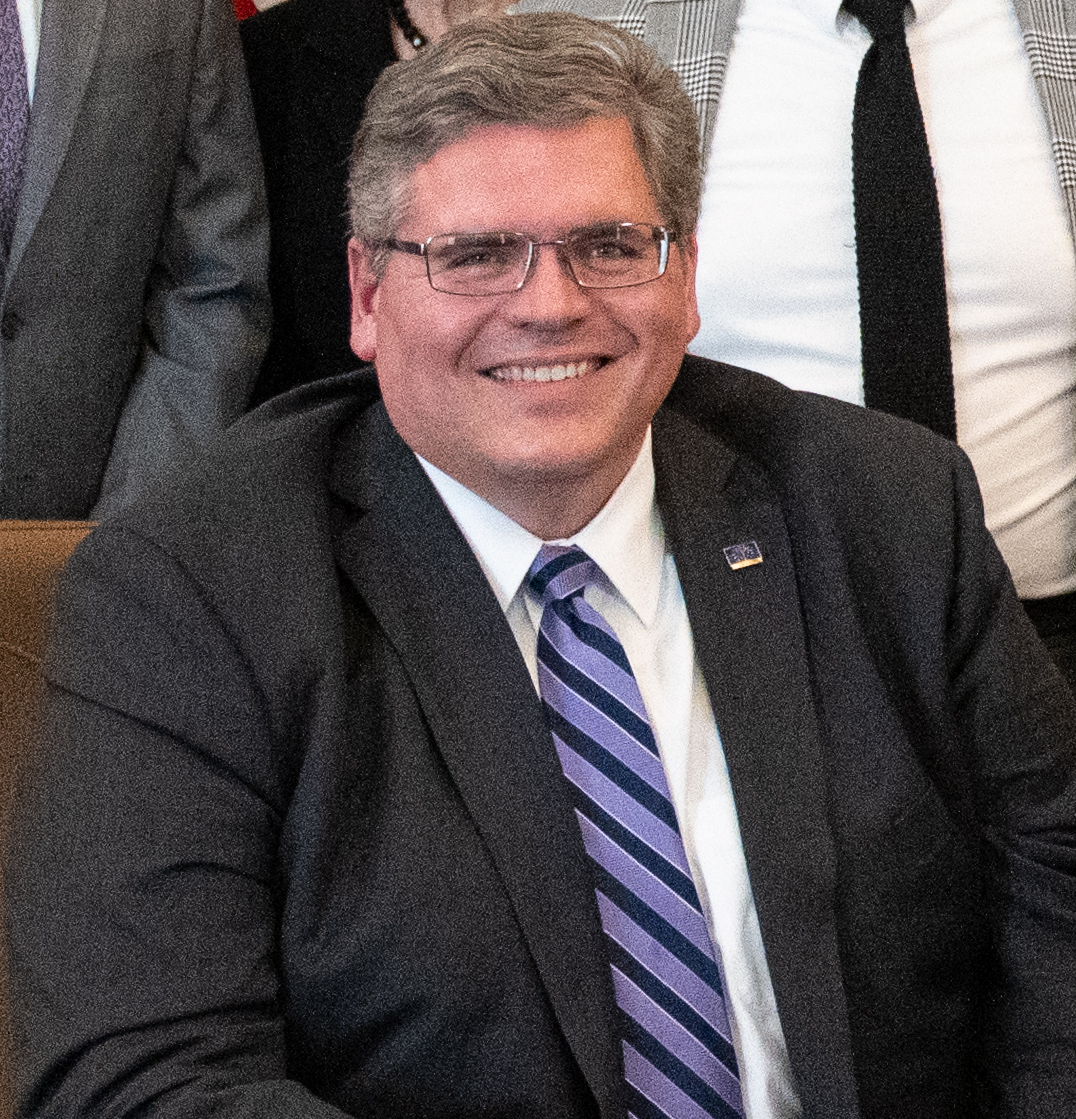
- Clere in 2023

Member of the Indiana House of Representatives from the 72nd district
- In office November 18, 2008 – November 4, 2026
- Preceded by: William Cochran

Personal details
- Born: Edward D. Clere; April 16, 1974 (age 52) Georgetown, Indiana
- Party: Independent (2026–present); Republican (until 2026)
- Spouse: Amy
- Children: 5
- Education: Indiana University Southeast
- Occupation: Politician

Edward D. Clere (born April 16, 1974) is an American politician who has been a member of the Indiana House of Representatives representing the 72nd district since 2008. He was a Republican throughout most of his tenure, but registered as an independent in 2026 after voting against proposed redistricting in the state.

== Political career ==
=== Indiana House of Representatives ===
Clere was first elected in 2008, winning by 108 votes on a margin of 0.36 points. He was re-elected in 2010 with almost 57% of the vote, and went on to win by similar margins in his later elections.

In 2015, Clere, concerned about the rapid spread of HIV in Scott County, urged then-governor Mike Pence to sign an executive order to allow needle exchange programs to operate. After resisting the intervention for over two months, Pence spoke to the county sheriff, prayed for guidance, then capitulated, allowing such a program to address the epidemic. The rate of infection slowed dramatically.

In 2023, Clere and one other Republican representative joined all 28 Democrats present in voting against an Indiana bill to ban transgender healthcare for children.

=== 2023 mayoral campaign ===
In 2023, Clere ran for mayor of New Albany. He lost to Democratic incumbent, Jeff Gahan, 52%–48%.

=== Defection and 2027 mayoral campaign ===
On January 30, 2026, Clere announced his departure from the Republican Party to become an independent, as well as his intention to run for mayor of New Albany in 2027.

== Personal life ==
Clere received the Chancellor's Medal from Indiana University Southeast in 2016.
