= Matt Pierce =

American educator and politician from Indiana

Member of the Indiana House of Representatives from the 61st district
- Incumbent
- Assumed office January 9, 2002
- Preceded by: Mark Kruzan

Personal details
- Born: Newton County, Indiana
- Party: Democratic
- Education: Indiana University Bloomington (BA, JD)
- Occupation: Lecturer

Matt Pierce is a Democratic member of the Indiana House of Representatives, representing the 61st District since 2002. He is also a lecturer in the Telecommunications department of the College of Arts and Sciences at Indiana University Bloomington, Indiana. He previously served as Chief of Staff to Congressman Baron Hill from 1999 to 2001.

He received a BA in Telecommunications and Political Science from Indiana University Bloomington in 1984 and a JD from Indiana University School of Law in Bloomington in 1987.
