= Heath VanNatter =

American politician from Indiana

Member of the Indiana House of Representatives from the 38th district
- Incumbent
- Assumed office November 3, 2010
- Preceded by: Jacque Clements
- In office May 28, 2008 – November 5, 2008
- Preceded by: Jim Buck
- Succeeded by: Jacque Clements

Personal details
- Party: Republican
- Spouse: Felicia
- Children: 3

Heath VanNatter is a Republican member of the Indiana House of Representatives representing the 38th district where he has served since 2010. He previously served in the State House in 2008.

Indiana House of Representatives
| Preceded by Jim Buck | Member of the Indiana House of Representatives from the 38th district 2008 | Succeeded by Jacque Clements |
| Preceded by Jacque Clements | Member of the Indiana House of Representatives from the 38th district 2010–present | Incumbent |
