= Pat Boy =

American businesswoman and politician

Member of the Indiana House of Representatives from the 9th district
- In office 2019 – October 17, 2025
- Preceded by: Scott Pelath
- Succeeded by: Randy Novak

Personal details
- Born: 1949 or 1950 (age 75–76)
- Party: Democratic
- Children: 1
- Education: DePaul University (BA)

Patricia A. Boy (born 1950) is an American businesswoman and politician who served in the Indiana House of Representatives from 2019 to 2025. A member of the Democratic Party, Boy represented Indiana's 9th House district, which contains Michigan City and the surrounding area. Prior to her election to the state house, Boy was a member of the Michigan City Common Council from 2004 to 2018.

== Biography ==
Boy was born in 1950. She attended DePaul University from 1968 until 1973, graduating with a Bachelor of Arts degree in English. Boy was the owner of File Clerk Corp., a data management company, from 1988 until its closure in 2016.

In 2004, Boy was elected to the Michigan City Common Council as member of the Democratic Party. She served on the council until 2018, when she ran for the Indiana House of Representatives. Boy ran for Indiana's 9th House district, which was being vacated by incumbent Democratic representative Scott Pelath. Boy defeated two opponents in the Democratic primary, receiving 48% of the vote. In the general election, Boy defeated attorney Dan Granquist, the Republican Party nominee, receiving 60% of the vote. Her election was part of a wider "pink wave" that occurred in 2018, in which a record number of women across the United States were elected to political office.

Boy ran for re-election in 2020, defeating Republican Dion Bergeron and receiving 56% of the vote. Boy ran for re-election in 2022, defeating Bergeron in a rematch.

In 2022, Boy served as the ranking member on the Natural Resources Committee in the state house.

Boy retired from the Indiana House in October 2025.
