= Karen Engleman =

American politician from Indiana

Member of the Indiana House of Representatives from the 70th district
- Incumbent
- Assumed office November 22, 2016
- Preceded by: Rhonda Rhoads

Personal details
- Born: February 15, 1953 (age 73)
- Party: Republican

Karen Engleman (born February 15, 1953) is an American politician who has served in the Indiana House of Representatives from the 70th district since 2016.

== Abortion ==
Engleman believes abortion should be made illegal in nearly all circumstances, even in cases of rape, incest, or the health of the mother. In July 2022, she attempted to pass legislation that would have prevented a 10-year-old incest victim from getting an abortion.
