= Peggy Mayfield =

American politician from Indiana

Member of the Indiana House of Representatives from the 60th district
- Incumbent
- Assumed office November 20, 2012
- Preceded by: Peggy Welch

Personal details
- Born: August 1, 1963 (age 62)
- Party: Republican

Peggy Mayfield (born August 1, 1963) is an American politician who has served in the Indiana House of Representatives from the 60th district since 2012.
