= Timothy Wesco =

American politician from Indiana

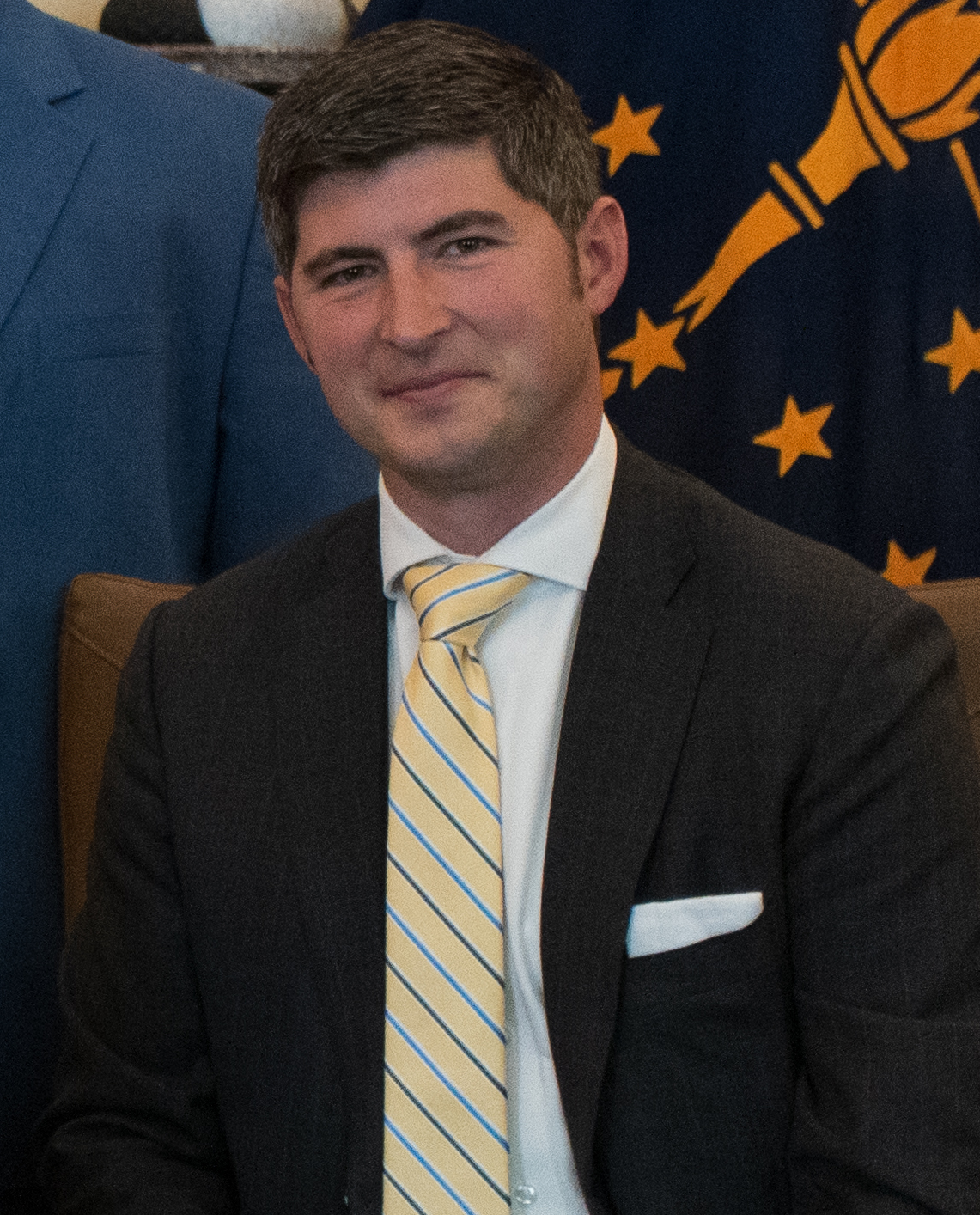

Member of the Indiana House of Representatives from the 21st district
- Incumbent
- Assumed office 2010
- Preceded by: Jackie Walorski

Personal details
- Party: Republican
- Education: Midwest School of Theology
- Occupation: Politician
- Website: timothywesco.com

Timothy Wesco is a Republican member of the Indiana House of Representatives, representing the 21st District since 2010. Following his election at 25, he was the youngest member of the Indiana House.

== Political positions ==
=== Abortion ===
Wesco opposes abortion rights in almost all circumstances, including rape or incest. In a July 2022 state House debate for a bill that would ban abortion in Indiana, he argued that rape victims should not have access to abortion, however, his voting record showed otherwise, as on the floor he voted against Amendment 76, which would have removed those exceptions.

=== No-Fault Divorce ===
In January 2025, Wesco introduced House Bill 1684, a bill which would end no-fault divorce for married couples with children. HB 1684 would require couples with children to prove their marriage is "irretrievably broken", either through witness testimony or both parties convincing a judge. It was criticized by domestic violence victim advocates as having the potential to make escaping abuse more difficult. The bill was withdrawn in February 2025.
