= Ed DeLaney =

American politician from Indiana

Member of the Indiana House of Representatives from the 86th district
- Incumbent
- Assumed office January 2009
- Preceded by: David Orentlicher

Personal details
- Party: Democratic
- Spouse: Ann
- Children: Kathleen, Jennifer and Tim
- Education: Binghamton University (BA, MA; Harvard University (JD)
- Occupation: Attorney

Military service
- Branch/service: United States Navy

Edward DeLaney is an American politician from the state of Indiana. He is a member of the Democratic Party and serves in the Indiana House of Representatives. He has represented the 86th District since 2009.

== Biography ==
DeLaney has a B.A. and an M.A. from Binghamton University. After serving his country as an officer in the Navy, Ed graduated from Harvard Law School with honors in 1973 and began work in Indianapolis at the firm of Barnes, Hickam, Pantzer & Boyd—now known as Barnes & Thornburg.

DeLaney has advocated for businesses and individuals in matters ranging from estate litigation, access to records litigation, business disputes, election law and First Amendment rights. DeLaney was the founding lawyer for Investigative Reporters & Editors, Inc. which is now an international organization with thousands of members. For several years, DeLaney has been an adjunct faculty member at Indiana University School of Law in Bloomington. He is a former partner in the law firm of DeLaney & DeLaney, which was founded by his wife Ann and daughter Kathleen.

DeLaney has represented the Federation of Bosnia and Herzegovina in an arbitration hearing under the Dayton Peace Accords. He speaks Russian fluently. He has been an election monitor for the International Republican Institute in Russia. For some 25 years, DeLaney has trained both groups and individuals in the skills of being an advocate. His experience has been recognized by the Best Lawyers in America and the Indiana Super Lawyers.

DeLaney served former Governor Evan Bayh as Chair of the Indiana Development Finance Authority from 1990 to 1996. He has been a member of the Indianapolis Police Merit Board and the Indianapolis Bar Association on its Judicial Evaluation Committee. The DeLaneys are parishioners at St. Thomas Aquinas where Ed served as President of the Parish Council and was a member of the capital campaign committee.

On November 6, 2012, Delaney won reelection by defeating Republican Luke Bosso 60 to 40 percent.

DeLaney and Ann married in 1967 and have three adult children: Kathleen, who is currently still a partner at DeLaney and DeLaney; Jennifer, a physician in St. Louis; and Tim, who is a partner at Bose, McKinney and Evans. They have eleven grandchildren: Emma, Miranda, Kevin, Aidan, John, Owen, Cormac, Cora, Elise, Josephine, and Caitlin.
