= 2024 Indiana House of Representatives election =

- November 5, 2024

All 100 seats in the Indiana House of Representatives 51 seats needed for a majority
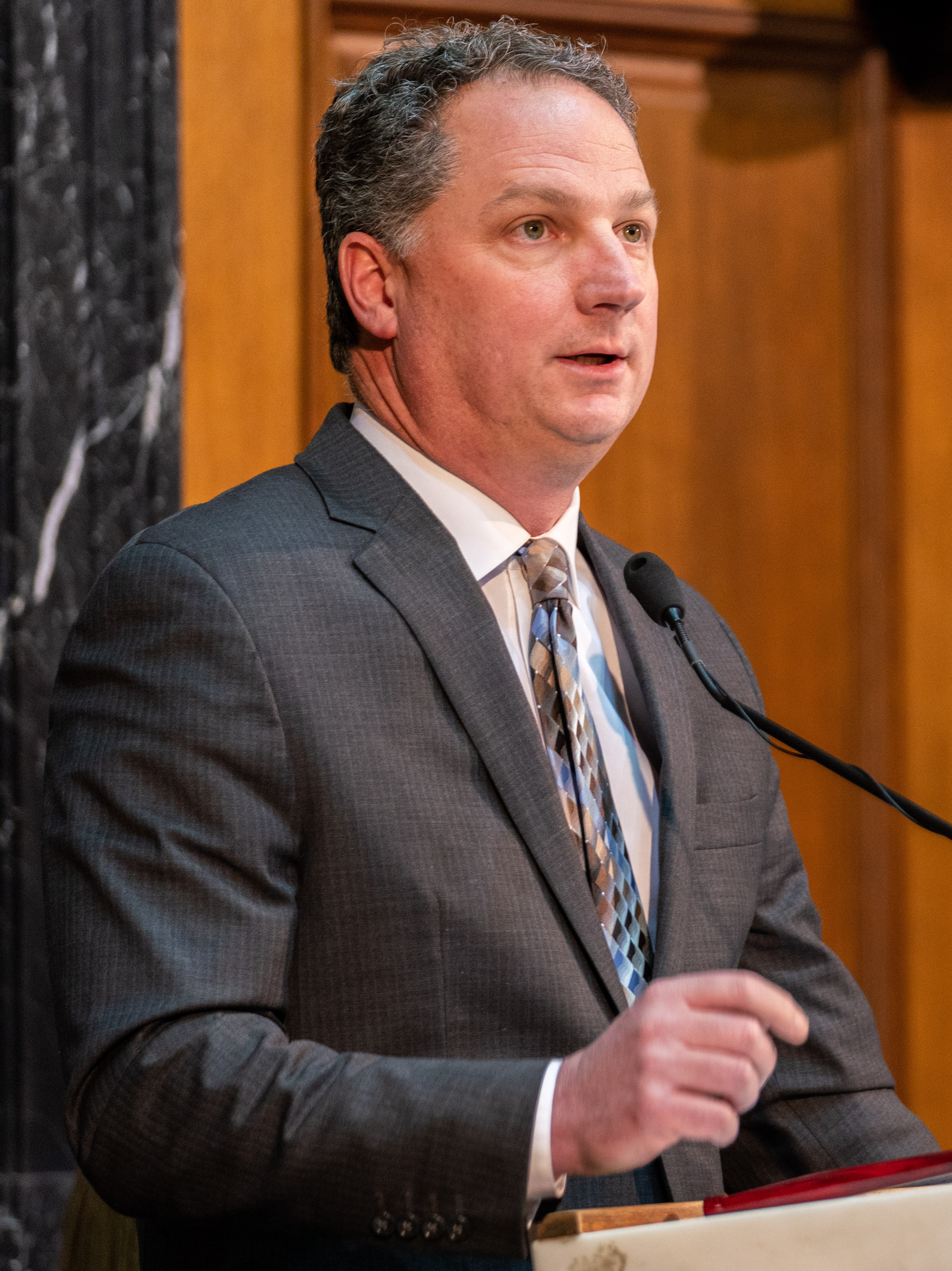

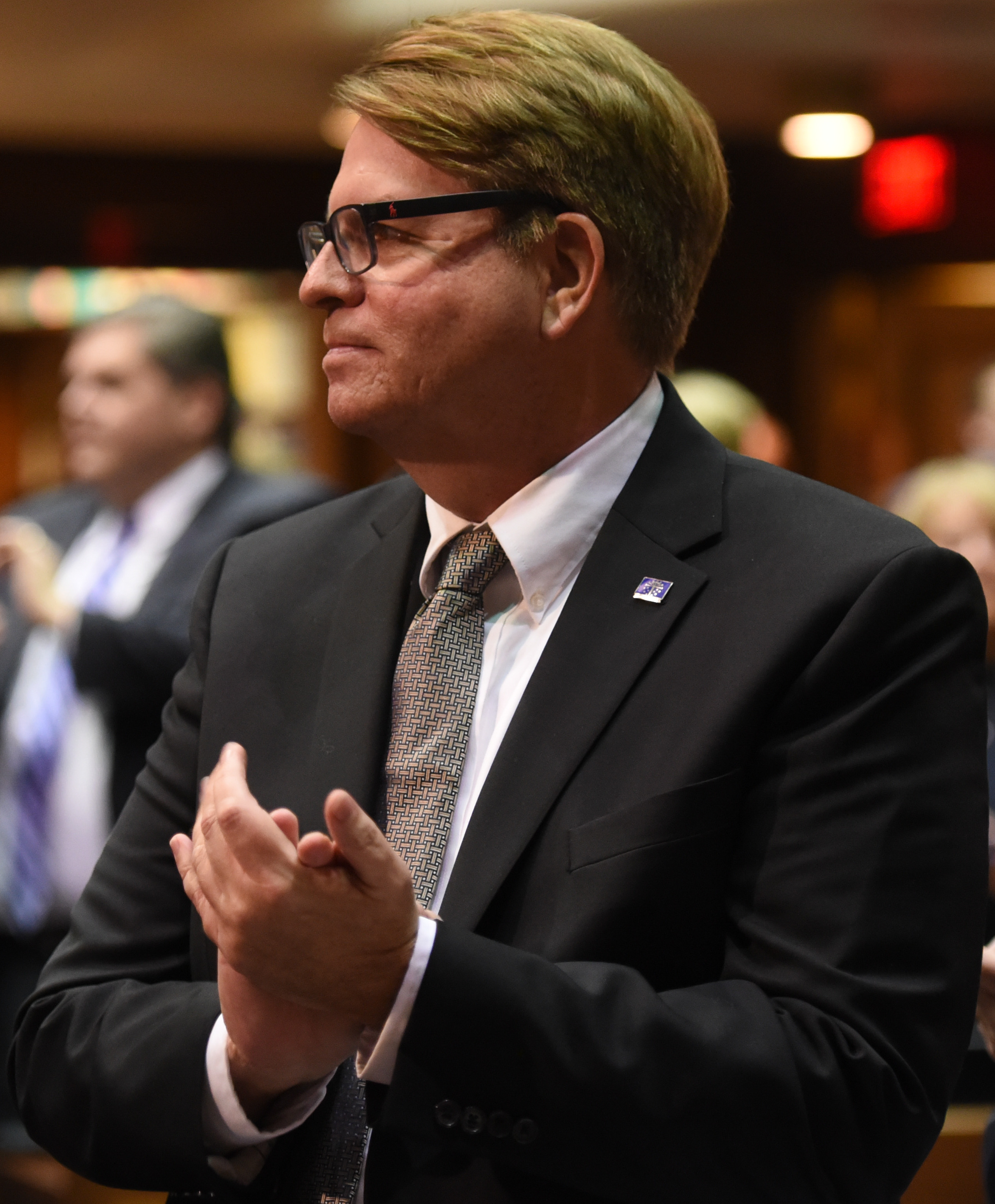
	Majority party	Minority party
Leader	Todd Huston	Phil GiaQuinta
Party	Republican	Democratic
Leader's seat	37th-Fishers	80th-Fort Wayne
Last election	70	30
Seats won	70	30
Seat change	Steady	Steady
Popular vote	1,675,017	941,783
Percentage	63.67%	35.80%
Swing	▼2.37%	▲2.79%
- Republican hold Democratic hold 50–60% 60–70% 70–80% 80–90% >90% 40–50% 50–60% 60–70% 70–80% 80–90% >90%
Speaker before election
Todd Huston
Republican
Elected Speaker
Todd Huston
Republican

The 2024 elections for the Indiana House of Representatives took place on Tuesday November 5, 2024, to elect representatives from all 100 districts in the Indiana House of Representatives. The primary elections took place on May 7, 2024. The Republican Party has held a House majority since 2011.

The elections for United States presidential election, Indiana's nine congressional districts, Indiana governor, and Indiana state senate were also held on this date.

== Overview ==
2024 Indiana State House general election
Party	Votes	Percentage	% Change	Seats before	Candidates	Seats after	+/–
Republican	1,675,017	63.67%	▼2.37%	70	86	70	Steady
Democratic	941,783	35.80%	▲2.79%	30	74	30	Steady
Libertarian	14,126	0.54%	▲0.15%	0	6	0	Steady
Totals	2,630,926	100.00%	—	100	166	100	—

== Background ==
In the 2020 United States Presidential election, Republican Donald Trump won the most votes in 70 Indiana House of Representatives Districts and Democrat Joe Biden won the most votes in 30 districts. Heading into the 2024 Indiana House of Representatives election, Democrats held one district where Trump won in 2020: District 43, located in Terre Haute (Trump +3%) while Republicans held one district where Biden won in 2020: District 62, which includes parts of Monroe, Brown, and Jackson counties (Biden +0.3%).

Biden 40–50% 50–60% 60–70% 70–80% 80–90% 90–100% / Trump 40–50% 50–60% 60–70% 70–80% 80–90% 90–100%

== Predictions ==
Source	Ranking	As of
CNalysis	Solid R	February 29, 2024

== Retirements ==
Nine incumbents retired.

=== Republicans ===
Seven Republicans retired.

1. District 24: Donna Schaibley retired.
2. District 29: Chuck Goodrich retired to run for Congress.
3. District 39: Jerry Torr retired.
4. District 51: Dennis Zent retired.
5. District 53: Bob Cherry retired.
6. District 68: Randy Lyness retired.
7. District 90: Mike Speedy retired to run for Congress.

=== Democrats ===
Two Democrats retired.

1. District 71: Rita Fleming resigned from her seat early in May 2024.
2. District 77: Ryan Hatfield retired to run for Vanderburgh County Circuit Court judge.

== Incumbents defeated ==
=== In primary election ===
One incumbent representative, a Republican, was defeated in the May 7 primary election.

==== Republicans ====
1. District 13: Sharon Negele lost renomination to Matt Commons.

== Summary of results by district ==
Italics denote an open seat held by the incumbent party; bold text denotes a gain for a party.

State House district	Incumbent	Party	Elected representative	Outcome
1	Carolyn Jackson	Dem	Carolyn Jackson	Dem hold
2	Earl Harris Jr.	Dem	Earl Harris Jr.	Dem hold
3	Ragen Hatcher	Dem	Ragen Hatcher	Dem hold
4	Edmond Soliday	Rep	Edmond Soliday	Rep hold
5	Dale DeVon	Rep	Dale DeVon	Rep hold
6	Maureen Bauer	Dem	Maureen Bauer	Dem hold
7	Jake Teshka	Rep	Jake Teshka	Rep hold
8	Ryan Dvorak	Dem	Ryan Dvorak	Dem hold
9	Pat Boy	Dem	Pat Boy	Dem hold
10	Charles Moseley	Dem	Charles Moseley	Dem hold
11	Michael Aylesworth	Rep	Michael Aylesworth	Rep hold
12	Mike Andrade	Dem	Mike Andrade	Dem hold
13	Sharon Negele	Rep	Matt Commons	Rep hold
14	Vernon Smith	Dem	Vernon Smith	Dem hold
15	Hal Slager	Rep	Hal Slager	Rep hold
16	Kendell Culp	Rep	Kendell Culp	Rep hold
17	Jack Jordan	Rep	Jack Jordan	Rep hold
18	David Abbott	Rep	David Abbott	Rep hold
19	Julie Olthoff	Rep	Julie Olthoff	Rep hold
20	Jim Pressel	Rep	Jim Pressel	Rep hold
21	Timothy Wesco	Rep	Timothy Wesco	Rep hold
22	Craig Snow	Rep	Craig Snow	Rep hold
23	Ethan Manning	Rep	Ethan Manning	Rep hold
24	Donna Schaibley	Rep	Hunter Smith	Rep hold
25	Becky Cash	Rep	Becky Cash	Rep hold
26	Chris Campbell	Dem	Chris Campbell	Dem hold
27	Sheila Klinker	Dem	Sheila Klinker	Dem hold
28	Jeff Thompson	Rep	Jeff Thompson	Rep hold
29	Chuck Goodrich	Rep	Alaina Shonkwiler	Rep hold
30	Michael Karickhoff	Rep	Michael Karickhoff	Rep hold
31	Lori Goss-Reaves	Rep	Lori Goss-Reaves	Rep hold
32	Victoria Garcia Wilburn	Dem	Victoria Garcia Wilburn	Dem hold
33	John "J. D." Prescott	Rep	John "J. D." Prescott	Rep hold
34	Sue Errington	Dem	Sue Errington	Dem hold
35	Elizabeth Rowray	Rep	Elizabeth Rowray	Rep hold
36	Kyle Pierce	Rep	Kyle Pierce	Rep hold
37	Todd Huston	Rep	Todd Huston	Rep hold
38	Heath VanNatter	Rep	Heath VanNatter	Rep hold
39	Jerry Torr	Rep	Daniel "Danny" Lopez	Rep hold
40	Greg Steuerwald	Rep	Greg Steuerwald	Rep hold
41	Mark Genda	Rep	Mark Genda	Rep hold
42	Alan Morrison	Rep	Alan Morrison	Rep hold
43	Tonya Pfaff	Dem	Tonya Pfaff	Dem hold
44	Beau Baird	Rep	Beau Baird	Rep hold
45	Bruce Borders	Rep	Bruce Borders	Rep hold
46	Bob Heaton	Rep	Bob Heaton	Rep hold
47	Robb Greene	Rep	Robb Greene	Rep hold
48	Douglas "Doug" Miller	Rep	Douglas "Doug" Miller	Rep hold
49	Joanna King	Rep	Joanna King	Rep hold
50	Lorissa Sweet	Rep	Lorissa Sweet	Rep hold
51	Dennis Zent	Rep	Tony Isa	Rep hold
52	Ben Smaltz	Rep	Ben Smaltz	Rep hold
53	Bob Cherry	Rep	Ethan Lawson	Rep hold
54	Cory Criswell	Rep	Cory Criswell	Rep hold
55	Lindsay Patterson	Rep	Lindsay Patterson	Rep hold
56	Bradford Barrett	Rep	Bradford Barrett	Rep hold
57	Craig Haggard	Rep	Craig Haggard	Rep hold
58	Michelle Davis	Rep	Michelle Davis	Rep hold
59	Ryan Lauer	Rep	Ryan Lauer	Rep hold
60	Peggy Mayfield	Rep	Peggy Mayfield	Rep hold
61	Matt Pierce	Dem	Matt Pierce	Dem hold
62	Dave Hall	Rep	Dave Hall	Rep hold
63	Shane Lindauer	Rep	Shane Lindauer	Rep hold
64	Matt Hostettler	Rep	Matt Hostettler	Rep hold
65	Christopher May	Rep	Christopher May	Rep hold
66	Zach Payne	Rep	Zach Payne	Rep hold
67	Alex Zimmerman	Rep	Alex Zimmerman	Rep hold
68	Randy Lyness	Rep	Garrett Bascom	Rep hold
69	Jim Lucas	Rep	Jim Lucas	Rep hold
70	Karen Engleman	Rep	Karen Engleman	Rep hold
71	Wendy Dant Chesser	Dem	Wendy Dant Chesser	Dem hold
72	Edward Clere	Rep	Edward Clere	Rep hold
73	Jennifer Meltzer	Rep	Jennifer Meltzer	Rep hold
74	Stephen Bartels	Rep	Stephen Bartels	Rep hold
75	Cindy Ledbetter	Rep	Cindy Ledbetter	Rep hold
76	Wendy McNamara	Rep	Wendy McNamara	Rep hold
77	Ryan Hatfield	Dem	Alex Burton	Dem hold
78	Tim O'Brien	Rep	Tim O'Brien	Rep hold
79	Matt Lehman	Rep	Matt Lehman	Rep hold
80	Phil GiaQuinta	Dem	Phil GiaQuinta	Dem hold
81	Martin Carbaugh	Rep	Martin Carbaugh	Rep hold
82	Kyle Miller	Dem	Kyle Miller	Dem hold
83	Christopher Judy	Rep	Christopher Judy	Rep hold
84	Robert Morris	Rep	Robert Morris	Rep hold
85	Dave Heine	Rep	Dave Heine	Rep hold
86	Ed DeLaney	Dem	Ed DeLaney	Dem hold
87	Carey Hamilton	Dem	Carey Hamilton	Dem hold
88	Chris Jeter	Rep	Chris Jeter	Rep hold
89	Mitch Gore	Dem	Mitch Gore	Dem hold
90	Mike Speedy	Rep	Andrew Ireland	Rep hold
91	Robert Behning	Rep	Robert Behning	Rep hold
92	Renee Pack	Dem	Renee Pack	Dem hold
93	Julie McGuire	Rep	Julie McGuire	Rep hold
94	Cherrish Pryor	Dem	Cherrish Pryor	Dem hold
95	John Bartlett	Dem	John Bartlett	Dem hold
96	Greg Porter	Dem	Greg Porter	Dem hold
97	Justin Moed	Dem	Justin Moed	Dem hold
98	Robin Shackleford	Dem	Robin Shackleford	Dem hold
99	Vanessa Summers	Dem	Vanessa Summers	Dem hold
100	Blake Johnson	Dem	Blake Johnson	Dem hold

== Districts 1–25 ==
=== District 1 ===
The district had been represented by Democrat Carolyn Jackson since 2018. Jackson was re-elected unopposed in 2022.

==== Democratic primary ====
===== Candidates =====
====== Declared ======
- Carolyn Jackson, incumbent state representative

==== General election ====
===== Endorsements =====
Carolyn Jackson

Organizations

- Indiana Farm Bureau AgELECT PAC

===== Results =====
General election
Party	Candidate	Votes	%
Democratic	Carolyn Jackson (incumbent)	13,932	100.0
Total votes		13,932	100.0
Democratic hold			

=== District 2 ===
The district had been represented by Democrat Earl Harris Jr. since 2016. Harris Jr. was re-elected unopposed in 2022.

==== Democratic primary ====
===== Candidates =====
====== Declared ======
- Earl Harris Jr., incumbent state representative

==== General election ====
===== Endorsements =====
Earl Harris Jr.

Organizations

- Indiana Farm Bureau AgELECT PAC

===== Results =====
General election
Party	Candidate	Votes	%
Democratic	Earl Harris Jr. (incumbent)	14,997	82.0
Republican	Ben Ruiz	3,290	18.0
Total votes		18,287	100.0
Democratic hold			

=== District 3 ===
The district had been represented by Democrat Ragen Hatcher since 2018. Hatcher was re-elected unopposed in 2022.

==== Democratic primary ====
===== Candidates =====
====== Declared ======
- Ragen Hatcher, incumbent state representative
- Heather McCarthy

==== Results ====
Democratic primary
Party	Candidate	Votes	%
Democratic	Ragen Hatcher (incumbent)	2,876	56.1
Democratic	Heather McCarthy	2,247	43.9
Total votes		5,123	100.0

==== General election ====
===== Results =====
General election
Party	Candidate	Votes	%
Democratic	Ragen Hatcher (incumbent)	14,763	63.1
Republican	Leslie A Dallner	8,617	36.9
Total votes		23,380	100.0
Democratic hold			

=== District 4 ===
The district had been represented by Republican Edmond Soliday since 2006. Soliday was re-elected unopposed in 2022.

==== Republican primary ====
===== Candidates =====
====== Declared ======
- Edmond Soliday, incumbent state representative

==== Democratic primary ====
===== Candidates =====
====== Declared ======
- Erika Robinson-Watkins, school board member

==== General election ====
===== Endorsements =====
Edmond Soliday

Organizations

- Indiana Farm Bureau AgELECT PAC
- NRA Political Victory Fund

===== Results =====
General election
Party	Candidate	Votes	%
Republican	Edmond Soliday (incumbent)	20,111	57.6
Democratic	Erika Robinson-Watkins	14,800	42.4
Total votes		34,911	100.0
Republican hold			

=== District 5 ===
The district had been represented by Republican Dale DeVon since 2012. DeVon was re-elected with 56.7% of the vote in 2022.

==== Republican primary ====
===== Candidates =====
====== Declared ======
- Dale DeVon, incumbent state representative

==== Democratic primary ====
===== Candidates =====
====== Declared ======
- Heidi Beidinger, professor

==== General election ====
===== Endorsements =====
Dale DeVon

Organizations

- Indiana Farm Bureau AgELECT PAC
- NRA Political Victory Fund

===== Results =====
General election
Party	Candidate	Votes	%
Republican	Dale DeVon (incumbent)	16,835	54.6
Democratic	Heidi Beidinger	14,013	45.4
Total votes		30,848	100.0
Republican hold			

=== District 6 ===
The district had been represented by Democrat Maureen Bauer since 2020. Bauer was re-elected unopposed in 2022.

==== Democratic primary ====
===== Candidates =====
====== Declared ======
- Maureen Bauer, incumbent state representative

==== Libertarian convention ====
===== Candidates =====
====== Declared ======
- Charlie Florance

==== General election ====
===== Endorsements =====
Maureen Bauer

Organizations

- Indiana Farm Bureau AgELECT PAC

===== Results =====
General election
Party	Candidate	Votes	%
Democratic	Maureen Bauer (incumbent)	14,861	81.0
Libertarian	Charlie Florance	3,483	19.0
Total votes		18,344	100.0
Democratic hold			

=== District 7 ===
The district had been represented by Republican Jake Teshka since 2020. Teshka was first elected with 60.8% of the vote in 2022.

==== Republican primary ====
===== Candidates =====
====== Declared ======
- Timothy Jaycox, candidate for this district in 2022
- Jake Teshka, incumbent state representative

===== Endorsements =====
Jake Teshka

Organizations

- Indiana Right to Life
- NRA Political Victory Fund

==== Results ====
Republican primary
Party	Candidate	Votes	%
Republican	Jake Teshka (incumbent)	4,130	84.4
Republican	Timothy Jaycox	761	15.6
Total votes		4,891	100.0

==== General election ====
===== Results =====
General election
Party	Candidate	Votes	%
Republican	Jake Teshka (incumbent)	20,991	100.0
Total votes		20,991	100.0
Republican hold			

=== District 8 ===
The district had been represented by Democrat Ryan Dvorak since 2002. Dvorak was re-elected unopposed in 2022.

==== Democratic primary ====
===== Candidates =====
====== Declared ======
- Ryan Dvorak, incumbent state representative

==== Republican primary ====
===== Candidates =====
====== Declared ======
- Joe Layne

==== General election ====
===== Results =====
General election
Party	Candidate	Votes	%
Democratic	Ryan Dvorak (incumbent)	19,461	100.0
Total votes		19,461	100.0
Democratic hold			

=== District 9 ===
The district had been represented by Democrat Patricia Boy since 2018. Boy was re-elected with 54.9% of the vote in 2022.

==== Democratic primary ====
===== Candidates =====
====== Declared ======
- Patricia Boy, incumbent state representative

==== General election ====
===== Results =====
General election
Party	Candidate	Votes	%
Democratic	Patricia Boy (incumbent)	15,149	51.0
Republican	Joel Florek	14,555	49.0
Total votes		29,704	100.0
Democratic hold			

=== District 10 ===
The district had been represented by Democrat Charles Moseley since 2008. Moseley was re-elected with 52.8% of the vote in 2022.

==== Democratic primary ====
===== Candidates =====
====== Declared ======
- Charles Moseley, incumbent state representative

==== Republican primary ====
===== Candidates =====
====== Declared ======
- Jeff Larson
- Manuel Maldonado

====== Results ======
Republican primary
Party	Candidate	Votes	%
Republican	Jeff Larson	2,090	74.2
Republican	Manuel Maldonado	726	25.8
Total votes		2,816	100.0

==== General election ====
===== Results =====
General election
Party	Candidate	Votes	%
Democratic	Charles Moseley (incumbent)	15,405	52.1
Republican	Jeff Larson	14,149	47.9
Total votes		29,554	100.0
Democratic hold			

=== District 11 ===
The district had been represented by Republican Michael Aylesworth since 2014. Aylesworth was re-elected unopposed in 2022.

==== Republican primary ====
===== Candidates =====
====== Declared ======
- Michael Aylesworth, incumbent state representative

==== General election ====
===== Endorsements =====
Michael Aylesworth

Organizations

- Indiana Farm Bureau AgELECT PAC

===== Results =====
General election
Party	Candidate	Votes	%
Republican	Michael Aylesworth (incumbent)	27,017	100.0
Total votes		27,017	100.0
Republican hold			

=== District 12 ===
The district had been represented by Democrat Mike Andrade since 2020. Andrade was re-elected with 55.6% of the vote in 2022.

==== Democratic primary ====
===== Candidates =====
====== Declared ======
- Mike Andrade, incumbent state representative

==== General election ====
===== Results =====
General election
Party	Candidate	Votes	%
Democratic	Mike Andrade (incumbent)	17,940	55.0
Republican	Jim Lietz	14,652	45.0
Total votes		32,592	100.0
Democratic hold			

=== District 13 ===
The district had been represented by Republican Sharon Negele since 2012. Negele was re-elected unopposed in 2022.

==== Republican primary ====
===== Candidates =====
====== Declared ======
- Matt Commons, teacher and Army veteran
- Sharon Negele, incumbent state representative

====== Endorsements ======
Sharon Negele

Organizations

- Indiana Farm Bureau AgELECT PAC
- NRA Political Victory Fund

====== Results ======
Republican primary
Party	Candidate	Votes	%
Republican	Matt Commons	6,151	60.2
Republican	Sharon Negele (incumbent)	4,067	39.8
Total votes		10,218	100.0

==== Democratic primary ====
===== Candidates =====
====== Declared ======
- Edward Moyer Jr.

==== General election ====
===== Endorsements =====
Matt Commons

Organizations

- Indiana Farm Bureau AgELECT PAC

===== Results =====
General election
Party	Candidate	Votes	%
Republican	Matt Commons	23,437	73.7
Democratic	Edward Moyer Jr.	8,355	26.3
Total votes		31,792	100.0
Republican hold			

=== District 14 ===
The district had been represented by Democrat Vernon Smith since 1990. Smith was re-elected unopposed in 2022.

==== Democratic primary ====
===== Candidates =====
====== Declared ======
- Vernon Smith, incumbent state representative

==== Republican primary ====
===== Candidates =====
====== Declared ======
- Ivan Ursery II

==== General election ====
===== Results =====
General election
Party	Candidate	Votes	%
Democratic	Vernon Smith (incumbent)	17,570	72.1
Republican	Ivan Ursery II	6,786	27.9
Total votes		24,356	100.0
Democratic hold			

=== District 15 ===
The district had been represented by Republican Hal Slager since 2020, but previously held office from 2012 to 2018. Slager was elected with 63.2% of the vote in 2022.

==== Republican primary ====
===== Candidates =====
====== Declared ======
- Hal Slager, incumbent state representative

==== General election ====
===== Endorsements =====
Hal Slager

Organizations

- NRA Political Victory Fund

===== Results =====
General election
Party	Candidate	Votes	%
Republican	Hal Slager (incumbent)	23,536	63.3
Democratic	Jack Walter	13,625	36.7
Total votes		37,161	100.0
Republican hold			

=== District 16 ===
The district had been represented by Republican Kendell Culp since 2022. Culp was first elected unopposed in 2022.

==== Republican primary ====
===== Candidates =====
====== Declared ======
- Kendell Culp, incumbent state representative

==== General election ====
===== Endorsements =====
Kendell Culp

Organizations

- Indiana Farm Bureau AgELECT PAC
- NRA Political Victory Fund

===== Results =====
General election
Party	Candidate	Votes	%
Republican	Kendell Culp (incumbent)	22,500	76.9
Democratic	Dennis Collins	6,740	23.1
Total votes		29,240	100.0
Republican hold			

=== District 17 ===
The district had been represented by Republican Jack Jordan since 2016. Jordan was re-elected with 74.8% of the vote in 2022.

==== Republican primary ====
===== Candidates =====
====== Declared ======
- Jack Jordan, incumbent state representative

==== General election ====
===== Endorsements =====
Jack Jordan

Organizations

- NRA Political Victory Fund

===== Results =====
General election
Party	Candidate	Votes	%
Republican	Jack Jordan (incumbent)	22,867	100.0
Total votes		22,867	100.0
Republican hold			

=== District 18 ===
The district had been represented by Republican David Abbott since 2022. Abbott was first elected to the district unopposed in 2022.

==== Republican primary ====
===== Candidates =====
====== Declared ======
- David Abbott, incumbent state representative

==== General election ====
===== Endorsements =====
David Abbott

Organizations

- NRA Political Victory Fund

===== Results =====
General election
Party	Candidate	Votes	%
Republican	David Abbott (incumbent)	24,250	100.0
Total votes		24,250	100.0
Republican hold			

=== District 19 ===
The district had been represented by Republican Julie Olthoff since 2020, and she had previously represented it from 2014 to 2018. Olthoff was first elected with 58.7% of the vote in 2022.

==== Republican primary ====
===== Candidates =====
====== Declared ======
- Julie Olthoff, incumbent state representative

==== General election ====
===== Endorsements =====
Julie Olthoff

Organizations

- NRA Political Victory Fund

===== Results =====
General election
Party	Candidate	Votes	%
Republican	Julie Olthoff (incumbent)	25,348	100.0
Total votes		25,348	100.0
Republican hold			

=== District 20 ===
The district had been represented by Republican Jim Pressel since 2016. Pressel was re-elected unopposed in 2022.

==== Republican primary ====
===== Candidates =====
====== Declared ======
- Richard Horner
- Jim Pressel, incumbent state representative

====== Results ======
Republican primary
Party	Candidate	Votes	%
Republican	Jim Pressel (incumbent)	4,485	74.3
Republican	Richard Horner	1,551	25.7
Total votes		6,036	100.0

==== General election ====
===== Endorsements =====
Jim Pressel

Organizations

- Indiana Farm Bureau AgELECT PAC
- Indiana Right to Life
- NRA Political Victory Fund

===== Results =====
General election
Party	Candidate	Votes	%
Republican	Jim Pressel (incumbent)	22,170	100.0
Total votes		22,170	100.0
Republican hold			

=== District 21 ===
The district had been represented by Republican Timothy Wesco since 2010. Wesco was re-elected with 73.8% of the vote in 2022.

==== Republican primary ====
===== Candidates =====
====== Declared ======
- Timothy Wesco, incumbent state representative

==== General election ====
===== Endorsements =====
Timothy Wesco

Organizations

- Indiana Farm Bureau AgELECT PAC
- NRA Political Victory Fund

===== Results =====
General election
Party	Candidate	Votes	%
Republican	Timothy Wesco (incumbent)	14,904	79.1
Libertarian	Melissa D Kauffmann	3,942	20.9
Total votes		18,846	100.0
Republican hold			

=== District 22 ===
The district had been represented by Republican Craig Snow since 2022. Snow was first elected to the district with 79.4% of the vote in 2022.

==== Republican primary ====
===== Candidates =====
====== Declared ======
- Craig Snow, incumbent state representative

==== Libertarian convention ====
===== Candidates =====
====== Declared ======
- Josh Vergiels

==== General election ====
===== Endorsements =====
Craig Snow

Organizations

- Indiana Farm Bureau AgELECT PAC
- NRA Political Victory Fund

===== Results =====
General election
Party	Candidate	Votes	%
Republican	Craig Snow (incumbent)	21,137	86.4
Libertarian	Josh Vergiels	3,332	13.6
Total votes		24,469	100.0
Republican hold			

=== District 23 ===
The district had been represented by Republican Ethan Manning since 2018. Manning was re-elected unopposed in 2022.

==== Republican primary ====
===== Candidates =====
====== Declared ======
- Ethan Manning, incumbent state representative

==== Democratic primary ====
===== Candidates =====
====== Declared ======
- Rick Rouser

==== General election ====
===== Endorsements =====
Ethan Manning

Organizations

- Indiana Farm Bureau AgELECT PAC
- NRA Political Victory Fund

===== Results =====
General election
Party	Candidate	Votes	%
Republican	Ethan Manning (incumbent)	18,330	73.9
Democratic	Rick Rouser	6,469	26.1
Total votes		24,799	100.0
Republican hold			

=== District 24 ===
The district had been represented by Republican Donna Schaibley since 2014. Schaibley was re-elected with 56.6% of the vote in 2022. Schaibley announced she would not seek re-election.

==== Republican primary ====
===== Candidates =====
====== Declared ======
- Bill Gutrich, corporate executive and small business owner
- Hunter Smith, former NFL punter

====== Declined ======
- Donna Schaibley, incumbent state representative

====== Endorsements ======
Bill Gutrich

State legislators

- Scott Baldwin, state senator from the 20th district (2020–present)

Local officials

- James Brainard, former mayor of Carmel (1996–2024)
- Scott Willis, mayor of Westfield (2023–present)
Hunter Smith

Organizations

- Americans for Prosperity
- Indiana Farm Bureau AgELECT PAC
- Indiana Right to Life

====== Results ======
Republican primary
Party	Candidate	Votes	%
Republican	Hunter Smith	5,135	61.5
Republican	Bill Gutrich	3,218	38.5
Total votes		8,353	100.0

==== Democratic primary ====
===== Candidates =====
====== Declared ======
- Josh Lowry, attorney and nominee for Indiana Senate in 2022

==== General election ====
===== Results =====
General election
Party	Candidate	Votes	%
Republican	Hunter Smith	23,364	56.2
Democratic	Josh Lowry	18,237	43.8
Total votes		41,601	100.0
Republican hold			

=== District 25 ===
The district had been represented by Republican Becky Cash since 2022. Cash was elected with 52.7% of the vote in 2022.

==== Republican primary ====
===== Candidates =====
====== Declared ======
- Becky Cash, incumbent state representative

==== Democratic primary ====
===== Candidates =====
====== Declared ======
- Tiffany Stoner

==== General election ====
===== Endorsements =====
Becky Cash

Organizations

- NRA Political Victory Fund

===== Results =====
General election
Party	Candidate	Votes	%
Republican	Becky Cash (incumbent)	18,794	50.1
Democratic	Tiffany Stoner	18,730	49.9
Total votes		37,524	100.0
Republican hold			

== Districts 26–50 ==
=== District 26 ===
The district had been represented by Democrat Chris Campbell since 2018. Campbell was re-elected with 59.9% of the vote in 2022.

==== Democratic primary ====
===== Candidates =====
====== Declared ======
- Chris Campbell, incumbent state representative

==== Republican primary ====
===== Candidates =====
====== Declared ======
- James Schenke

==== General election ====
===== Results =====
General election
Party	Candidate	Votes	%
Democratic	Chris Campbell (incumbent)	11,508	64.1
Republican	James Schenke	6,450	35.9
Total votes		17,958	100.0
Democratic hold			

=== District 27 ===
The district had been represented by Democrat Sheila Klinker since 1982. Klinker was re-elected with 60.1% of the vote in 2022.

==== Democratic primary ====
===== Candidates =====
====== Declared ======
- Sheila Klinker, incumbent state representative

==== Republican primary ====
===== Candidates =====
====== Declared ======
- Oscar Alvarez

==== General election ====
===== Results =====
General election
Party	Candidate	Votes	%
Democratic	Sheila Klinker (incumbent)	13,398	61.5
Republican	Oscar Alvarez	8,383	38.5
Total votes		21,781	100.0
Democratic hold			

=== District 28 ===
The district had been represented by Republican Jeff Thompson since 1998. Thompson was re-elected unopposed in 2022.

==== Republican primary ====
===== Candidates =====
====== Declared ======
- Joe Batic
- Jeff Thompson, incumbent state representative

===== Results =====
Republican primary
Party	Candidate	Votes	%
Republican	Jeff Thompson (incumbent)	5,642	65.4
Republican	Joe Batic	2,979	34.6
Total votes		8,621	100.0

==== Democratic primary ====
===== Candidates =====
====== Declared ======
- Karen Whitney

==== General election ====
===== Endorsements =====
Jeff Thompson

Organizations

- Indiana Farm Bureau AgELECT PAC
- Indiana Right to Life
- NRA Political Victory Fund

===== Results =====
General election
Party	Candidate	Votes	%
Republican	Jeff Thompson (incumbent)	23,989	71.8
Democratic	Karen Whitney	9,442	28.2
Total votes		33,431	100.0
Republican hold			

=== District 29 ===
The district had been represented by Republican Chuck Goodrich since 2018. Goodrich was re-elected unopposed in 2022. Goodrich chose to run to become a US Representative.

==== Republican primary ====
===== Candidates =====
====== Declared ======
- Laura Alerding, Noblesville Schools Board of Trustees member and former Hamilton East Public Library Board President
- Alaina Shonkwiler, government advisor

====== Declined ======
- Chuck Goodrich, incumbent state representative (running for U.S. House for 5th district)

===== Endorsements =====
Laura Alerding

State officials

- Todd Rokita, 44th Indiana Attorney General (2021–present), former U.S. Representative for Indiana's 4th congressional district (2011–2019), and 59th Secretary of State of Indiana (2002–2010)
Alaina Shonkwiler

U.S. Representatives

- Susan Brooks, former U.S. Representative for Indiana's 5th congressional district (2013–2021)

State legislators

- Luke Kenley, former state senator from the 20th district (1992–2017)
- Scott Baldwin, state senator from the 20th district (2020–present)

Local officials

- Scott Fadness, mayor of Fishers (2015–present)
- Chris Jensen, mayor of Noblesville (2019–present)

Organizations

- NRA Political Victory Fund

===== Results =====
Republican primary
Party	Candidate	Votes	%
Republican	Alaina Shonkwiler	4,809	59.2
Republican	Laura Alerding	3,311	40.8
Total votes		8,120	100.0

==== Democratic primary ====
===== Candidates =====
====== Declared ======
- Christopher Hartig

==== General election ====
===== Results =====
General election
Party	Candidate	Votes	%
Republican	Alaina Shonkwiler	22,794	63.4
Democratic	Christopher Hartig	13,170	36.6
Total votes		35,964	100.0
Republican hold			

=== District 30 ===
The district had been represented by Republican Michael Karickhoff since 2010. Karickhoff was re-elected with 67.5% of the vote in 2022.

==== Republican primary ====
===== Candidates =====
====== Declared ======
- Michael Karickhoff, incumbent state representative

==== Democratic primary ====
===== Candidates =====
====== Declared ======
- Michael Katcher

==== General election ====
===== Endorsements =====
Michael Karickhoff

Organizations

- Indiana Farm Bureau AgELECT PAC
- NRA Political Victory Fund

===== Results =====
General election
Party	Candidate	Votes	%
Republican	Michael Karickhoff (incumbent)	19,303	67.5
Democratic	Michael Katcher	9,309	32.5
Total votes		28,612	100.0
Republican hold			

=== District 31 ===
The district had been represented by Republican Ann Vermilion since her appointment in 2019. Vermilion was re-elected unopposed in 2022. Vermilion resigned during her team; Lori Goss-Reaves was elected via caucus to replace her.

==== Republican primary ====
===== Candidates =====
====== Declared ======
- Lori Goss-Reaves, incumbent state representative

====== Declined ======
- Ann Vermilion, former state representative

==== General election ====
===== Results =====
General election
Party	Candidate	Votes	%
Republican	Lori Goss-Reaves (incumbent)	19,345	100.0
Total votes		19,345	100.0
Republican hold			

=== District 32 ===
The district had been represented by Democrat Victoria Wilburn since 2022. Wilburn was elected with 50.5% of the vote in 2022.

==== Democratic primary ====
===== Candidates =====
====== Declared ======
- Victoria Wilburn, incumbent state representative

====== Endorsements ======
Victoria Wilburn

Organizations

- Indiana Farm Bureau AgELECT PAC

==== Republican primary ====
===== Candidates =====
====== Declared ======
- Patricia Bratton

====== Withdrawn ======
- Tom Havens

==== General election ====
===== Results =====
General election
Party	Candidate	Votes	%
Democratic	Victoria Wilburn (incumbent)	17,994	52.1
Republican	Patricia Bratton	16,542	47.9
Total votes		34,536	100.0
Democratic hold			

=== District 33 ===
The district had been represented by Republican J. D. Prescott since 2018. Prescott was re-elected with 70.4% of the vote in 2022.

==== Republican primary ====
===== Candidates =====
====== Declared ======
- Gregory LeMaster
- J. D. Prescott, incumbent state representative

===== Endorsements =====
J. D. Prescott

Organizations

- Indiana Farm Bureau AgELECT PAC
- Indiana Right to Life
- NRA Political Victory Fund

===== Results =====
Republican primary
Party	Candidate	Votes	%
Republican	J. D. Prescott (incumbent)	6,035	70.7
Republican	Gregory LeMaster	2,506	29.3
Total votes		8,541	100.0

==== Democratic primary ====
===== Candidates =====
====== Declared ======
- John E. Bartlett
- Jim Phillips

===== Results =====
Democratic primary
Party	Candidate	Votes	%
Democratic	John E. Bartlett	859	69.2
Democratic	Jim Phillips	383	30.8
Total votes		1,242	100.0

==== General election ====
===== Results =====
General election
Party	Candidate	Votes	%
Republican	J.D. Prescott (incumbent)	21,160	73.0
Democratic	John E. Bartlett	7,818	27.0
Total votes		28,978	100.0
Republican hold			

=== District 34 ===
The district had been represented by Democrat Sue Errington since 2012. Errington was re-elected with 52.8% of the vote in 2022.

==== Democratic primary ====
===== Candidates =====
====== Declared ======
- Sue Errington, incumbent state representative

==== Republican primary ====
===== Candidates =====
====== Declared ======
- Susan Dillon

==== General election ====
===== Results =====
General election
Party	Candidate	Votes	%
Democratic	Sue Errington (incumbent)	12,156	55.1
Republican	Susan Dillon	9,910	44.9
Total votes		22,066	100.0
Democratic hold			

=== District 35 ===
The district had been represented by Republican Elizabeth Rowray since 2020. Rowray was first elected with 70% of the vote in 2022.

==== Republican primary ====
===== Candidates =====
====== Declared ======
- Elizabeth Rowray, incumbent state representative

==== Democratic primary ====
===== Candidates =====
====== Declared ======
- Phil Gift

==== General election ====
===== Endorsements =====
Elizabeth Rowray

Organizations

- NRA Political Victory Fund

===== Results =====
General election
Party	Candidate	Votes	%
Republican	Elizabeth Rowray (incumbent)	22,529	71.0
Democratic	Phil Gift	9,204	29.0
Total votes		31,733	100.0
Republican hold			

=== District 36 ===
The district had been represented by Republican Kyle Pierce since 2022. Pierce was elected with 50.9% of the vote in 2022.

==== Republican primary ====
===== Candidates =====
====== Declared ======
- Kyle Pierce, incumbent state representative

==== General election ====
===== Endorsements =====
Kyle Pierce

Organizations

- Indiana Farm Bureau AgELECT PAC
- NRA Political Victory Fund

===== Results =====
General election
Party	Candidate	Votes	%
Republican	Kyle Pierce (incumbent)	15,310	59.0
Democratic	Thonja M Nicholson	10,623	41.0
Total votes		25,933	100.0
Republican hold			

=== District 37 ===
The district had been represented by Republican Todd Huston since 2012. Huston was re-elected unopposed in 2022.

==== Republican primary ====
===== Candidates =====
====== Declared ======
- Todd Huston, incumbent state representative

==== General election ====
===== Endorsements =====
Todd Huston

Organizations

- Indiana Farm Bureau AgELECT PAC
- NRA Political Victory Fund

===== Results =====
General election
Party	Candidate	Votes	%
Republican	Todd Huston (incumbent)	24,212	100.0
Total votes		24,212	100.0
Republican hold			

=== District 38 ===
The district had been represented by Republican Heath VanNatter since 2010. VanNatter was re-elected unopposed in 2020.

==== Republican primary ====
===== Candidates =====
====== Declared ======
- Heath VanNatter, incumbent state representative

==== Democratic primary ====
===== Candidates =====
====== Declared ======
- Carl Seese

==== General election ====
===== Endorsements =====
Heath VanNatter

Organizations

- Indiana Farm Bureau AgELECT PAC
- NRA Political Victory Fund

===== Results =====
General election
Party	Candidate	Votes	%
Republican	Heath VanNatter (incumbent)	25,387	75.3
Democratic	Carl Seese	8,339	24.7
Total votes		33,726	100.0
Republican hold			

=== District 39 ===
The district had been represented by Republican Jerry Torr since 1996. Torr was re-elected with 52.4% of the vote in 2022. Torr announced he would retire at the end of his term.

==== Republican primary ====
===== Candidates =====
====== Declared ======
- Danny Lopez, businessman

====== Declined ======
- Jerry Torr, incumbent state representative

==== Democratic primary ====
===== Candidates =====
====== Declared ======
- Matt McNally, passenger airline pilot and nominee for this district in 2022

==== General election ====
===== Endorsements =====
Danny Lopez

Local officials

- Sue Finkam, Mayor of Carmel (2024–present)

Organizations

- Indiana Farm Bureau AgELECT PAC

===== Results =====
General election
Party	Candidate	Votes	%
Republican	Danny Lopez	21,164	53.7
Democratic	Matt McNally	18,223	46.3
Total votes		39,387	100.0
Republican hold			

=== District 40 ===
The district had been represented by Republican Greg Steuerwald since his appointment in 2007. Steuerwald was re-elected unopposed in 2022.

==== Republican primary ====
===== Candidates =====
====== Declared ======
- Brian Paasch
- Greg Steuerwald, incumbent state representative

===== Endorsements =====
Greg Steuerwald

Organizations

- Indiana Farm Bureau AgELECT PAC
- Indiana Right to Life
- NRA Political Victory Fund

===== Results =====
Republican primary
Party	Candidate	Votes	%
Republican	Greg Steuerwald (incumbent)	3,519	63.2
Republican	Brian Paasch	2,050	36.8
Total votes		5,569	100.0

==== Democratic primary ====
===== Candidates =====
====== Declared ======
- Robert Pope III, veteran

==== General election ====
===== Results =====
General election
Party	Candidate	Votes	%
Republican	Greg Steuerwald (incumbent)	17,489	58.4
Democratic	Robert Pope III	12,478	41.6
Total votes		29,967	100.0
Republican hold			

=== District 41 ===
The district had been represented by Republican Mark Genda since 2022. Genda was elected with 75.3% of the vote in 2022.

==== Republican primary ====
===== Candidates =====
====== Declared ======
- Mark Genda, incumbent state representative
- Joe Sturm

===== Endorsements =====
Mark Genda

Organizations

- Indiana Farm Bureau AgELECT PAC
- Indiana Right to Life
- NRA Political Victory Fund

===== Results =====
Republican primary
Party	Candidate	Votes	%
Republican	Mark Genda (incumbent)	5,359	68.7
Republican	Joe Sturm	2,440	31.3
Total votes		7,799	100.0

==== Democratic primary ====
===== Candidates =====
====== Declared ======
- Dan Sikes

==== General election ====
===== Results =====
General election
Party	Candidate	Votes	%
Republican	Mark Genda (incumbent)	20,495	73.1
Democratic	Dan Sikes	7,542	26.9
Total votes		28,037	100.0
Republican hold			

=== District 42 ===
The district had been represented by Republican Alan Morrison since 2012. Morrison was re-elected with 68.4% of the vote in 2022.

==== Republican primary ====
===== Candidates =====
====== Declared ======
- Alan Morrison, incumbent state representative
- Tim Yocum

===== Endorsements =====
Alan Morrison

Organizations

- Indiana Right to Life
- NRA Political Victory Fund

===== Results =====
Republican primary
Party	Candidate	Votes	%
Republican	Alan Morrison (incumbent)	5,702	61.1
Republican	Tim Yocum	3,626	38.9
Total votes		9,328	100.0

==== Democratic primary ====
===== Candidates =====
====== Declared ======
- Chad Harmon

==== General election ====
===== Results =====
General election
Party	Candidate	Votes	%
Republican	Alan Morrison (incumbent)	24,611	100.0
Total votes		24,611	100.0
Republican hold			

=== District 43 ===
The district had been represented by Democrat Tonya Pfaff since 2018. Pfaff was re-elected with 58.4% of the vote in 2022.

==== Democratic primary ====
===== Candidates =====
====== Declared ======
- Tonya Pfaff, incumbent state representative

==== General election ====
===== Results =====
General election
Party	Candidate	Votes	%
Democratic	Tonya Pfaff (incumbent)	16,847	100.0
Total votes		16,847	100.0
Democratic hold			

=== District 44 ===
The district had been represented by Republican Beau Baird since 2018. Baird was re-elected unopposed in 2022.

==== Republican primary ====
===== Candidates =====
====== Declared ======
- Beau Baird, incumbent state representative

====== Endorsements ======
Beau Baird

Organizations

- Indiana Farm Bureau AgELECT PAC
- NRA Political Victory Fund

==== General election ====
===== Results =====
General election
Party	Candidate	Votes	%
Republican	Beau Baird (incumbent)	24,061	100.0
Total votes		24,061	100.0
Republican hold			

=== District 45 ===
The district had been represented by Republican Bruce Borders since 2014, but previously held office from 2004 to 2012. Borders was re-elected with 69.8% of the vote in 2022.

==== Republican primary ====
===== Candidates =====
====== Declared ======
- Bruce Borders, incumbent state representative
- Jeff Ellington, former state representative
- Kellie Streeter

====== Endorsements ======
Bruce Borders

Organizations

- Indiana Right to Life
- NRA Political Victory Fund
Kellie Streeter

Organizations

- Indiana Farm Bureau AgELECT PAC

===== Results =====
Republican primary
Party	Candidate	Votes	%
Republican	Bruce Borders (incumbent)	3,553	38.0
Republican	Kellie Streeter	3,230	34.6
Republican	Jeff Ellington	2,557	27.4
Total votes		9,340	100.0

==== General election ====
===== Results =====
General election
Party	Candidate	Votes	%
Republican	Bruce Borders (incumbent)	23,309	100.0
Total votes		23,309	100.0
Republican hold			

=== District 46 ===
The district had been represented by Republican Bob Heaton since 2010. Heaton was re-elected with 66.7% of the vote in 2022.

==== Republican primary ====
===== Candidates =====
====== Declared ======
- Bob Heaton, incumbent state representative

==== Democratic primary ====
===== Candidates =====
====== Declared ======
- Kurtis Cummings

==== General election ====
===== Endorsements =====
Bob Heaton

Organizations

- NRA Political Victory Fund

===== Results =====
General election
Party	Candidate	Votes	%
Republican	Bob Heaton (incumbent)	20,852	67.9
Democratic	Kurtis Cummings	9,847	32.1
Total votes		30,699	100.0
Republican hold			

=== District 47 ===
The district had been represented by Republican Robb Greene since 2022. Greene was elected unopposed in 2022.

==== Republican primary ====
===== Candidates =====
====== Declared ======
- Robb Greene, incumbent state representative

==== Democratic primary ====
===== Candidates =====
====== Declared ======
- Michael Potter

==== General election ====
===== Endorsements =====
Robb Greene

Organizations

- Indiana Farm Bureau AgELECT PAC
- NRA Political Victory Fund

===== Results =====
General election
Party	Candidate	Votes	%
Republican	Robb Greene (incumbent)	23,888	74.0
Democratic	Michael Potter	8,402	26.0
Total votes		32,290	100.0
Republican hold			

=== District 48 ===
The district had been represented by Republican Doug Miller since 2014. Miller was re-elected unopposed in 2022.

==== Republican primary ====
===== Candidates =====
====== Declared ======
- Doug Miller, incumbent state representative

==== General election ====
===== Endorsements =====
Doug Miller

Organizations

- Indiana Farm Bureau AgELECT PAC
- NRA Political Victory Fund

===== Results =====
General election
Party	Candidate	Votes	%
Republican	Doug Miller (incumbent)	18,878	100.0
Total votes		18,878	100.0
Republican hold			

=== District 49 ===
The district had been represented by Republican Joanna King since her appointment in 2020. King was re-elected with 67.2% of the vote in 2022.

==== Republican primary ====
===== Candidates =====
====== Declared ======
- Cindi Hajicek
- Joanna King, incumbent state representative

===== Endorsements =====
Joanna King

Organizations

- Indiana Farm Bureau AgELECT PAC
- Indiana Right to Life
- NRA Political Victory Fund

===== Results =====
Republican primary
Party	Candidate	Votes	%
Republican	Joanna King (incumbent)	3,803	65
Republican	Cindi Hajicek	2,049	35
Total votes		5,852	100.0

==== General election ====
===== Results =====
General election
Party	Candidate	Votes	%
Republican	Joanna King (incumbent)	17,915	100.0
Total votes		17,915	100.0
Republican hold			

=== District 50 ===
The district had been represented by Republican Lorissa Sweet since 2022. Sweet was elected with 67.2% of the vote in 2022.

==== Republican primary ====
===== Candidates =====
====== Declared ======
- Rob Miller, Huntington County commissioner
- Lorissa Sweet, incumbent state representative

===== Results =====
Republican primary
Party	Candidate	Votes	%
Republican	Lorissa Sweet (incumbent)	6,576	65.5
Republican	Rob Miller	3,457	34.5
Total votes		10,033	100.0

==== Democratic primary ====
===== Candidates =====
====== Declared ======
- Joe Swisher

==== General election ====
===== Endorsements =====
Lorissa Sweet

Organizations

- Indiana Farm Bureau AgELECT PAC
- NRA Political Victory Fund

===== Results =====
General election
Party	Candidate	Votes	%
Republican	Lorissa Sweet (incumbent)	23,785	76.9
Democratic	Joe Swisher	7,136	23.1
Total votes		30,921	100.0
Republican hold			

== Districts 51–75 ==
=== District 51 ===
The district had been represented by Republican Dennis Zent since 2012. Zent was re-elected with 75.6% of the vote in 2022. Zent announced he would retire at the end of his term.

==== Republican primary ====
===== Candidates =====
====== Declared ======
- Tony Isa, Steuben County councilor
- Rhonda Sharp, physician

====== Declined ======
- Dennis Zent, incumbent state representative

====== Endorsements ======
Tony Isa

Organizations

- Indiana Farm Bureau AgELECT PAC
- NRA Political Victory Fund

===== Results =====
Republican primary
Party	Candidate	Votes	%
Republican	Tony Isa	3,968	57.3
Republican	Rhonda Sharp	2,963	42.7
Total votes		6,931	100.0

==== Democratic primary ====
===== Candidates =====
====== Declared ======
- Judy Rowe, realtor

==== General election ====
===== Results =====
General election
Party	Candidate	Votes	%
Republican	Tony Isa	16,777	74.4
Democratic	Judy Rowe	5,764	25.6
Total votes		22,541	100.0
Republican hold			

=== District 52 ===
The district had been represented by Republican Ben Smaltz since 2012. Smaltz was re-elected with 81.7% of the vote in 2022.

==== Republican primary ====
===== Candidates =====
====== Declared ======
- Curt Hammitt
- Ben Smaltz, incumbent state representative

===== Endorsements =====
Ben Smaltz

Organizations

- Indiana Farm Bureau AgELECT PAC
- Indiana Right to Life
- NRA Political Victory Fund

===== Results =====
Republican primary
Party	Candidate	Votes	%
Republican	Ben Smaltz (incumbent)	6,206	72.7
Republican	Curt Hammitt	2,335	27.3
Total votes		8,541	100.0

==== Democratic primary ====
===== Candidates =====
====== Declared ======
- Walt Sorg

==== General election ====
===== Results =====
General election
Party	Candidate	Votes	%
Republican	Ben Smaltz (incumbent)	22,279	76.7
Democratic	Walt Sorg	6,750	23.3
Total votes		29,029	100.0
Republican hold			

=== District 53 ===
The district had been represented by Republican Bob Cherry since 1998. Cherry was re-elected unopposed in 2022. He announced he would retire at the end of his term.

==== Republican primary ====
===== Candidates =====
====== Declared ======
- Keely Butrum, Hancock County councilor
- Brian Evans, veteran
- Ethan Lawson, Hancock County Republican Party Vice-Chair
- Kevin Mandrell, businessman

====== Declined ======
- Bob Cherry, incumbent state representative

===== Endorsements =====
Ethan Lawson

Organizations

- Indiana Right to Life (co-endorsement with Mandrell)
Kevin Mandrell

Organizations

- Indiana Right to Life (co-endorsement with Lawson)

===== Results =====
Republican primary
Party	Candidate	Votes	%
Republican	Ethan Lawson	2,982	33.8
Republican	Kevin Mandrell	2,319	26.3
Republican	Keely Butrum	2,205	25.0
Republican	Brian Evans	1,324	15.0
Total votes		8,830	100.0

==== Democratic primary ====
===== Candidates =====
====== Declared ======
- Nate Anderson

==== General election ====
===== Endorsements =====
Ethan Lawson

Organizations

- Indiana Farm Bureau AgELECT PAC
- Indiana Right to Life
- NRA Political Victory Fund

===== Results =====
General election
Party	Candidate	Votes	%
Republican	Ethan Lawson	24,454	70.4
Democratic	Nate Anderson	10,281	29.6
Total votes		34,735	100.0
Republican hold			

=== District 54 ===
The district had been represented by Republican Cory Criswell since 2022. Criswell was elected with 73.7% of the vote in 2022.

==== Republican primary ====
===== Candidates =====
====== Declared ======
- Cory Criswell, incumbent state representative

==== General election ====
===== Endorsements =====
Cory Criswell

Organizations

- Indiana Farm Bureau AgELECT PAC

===== Results =====
General election
Party	Candidate	Votes	%
Republican	Cory Criswell (incumbent)	24,738	100.0
Total votes		24,738	100.0
Republican hold			

=== District 55 ===
The district had been represented by Republican Lindsay Patterson since 2022. Patterson was elected unopposed in 2022.

==== Republican primary ====
===== Candidates =====
====== Declared ======
- Lindsay Patterson, incumbent state representative

==== General election ====
===== Results =====
General election
Party	Candidate	Votes	%
Republican	Lindsay Patterson (incumbent)	24,820	80.5
Democratic	Victoria Martz	6,016	19.5
Total votes		30,836	100.0
Republican hold			

=== District 56 ===
The district had been represented by Republican Brad Barrett since 2018. Barrett was re-elected with 69.9% of the vote in 2022.

==== Republican primary ====
===== Candidates =====
====== Declared ======
- Brad Barrett, incumbent state representative

==== General election ====
===== Endorsements =====
Brad Barrett

Organizations

- Indiana Farm Bureau AgELECT PAC

===== Results =====
General election
Party	Candidate	Votes	%
Republican	Brad Barrett (incumbent)	20,218	100.0
Total votes		20,218	100.0
Republican hold			

=== District 57 ===
The district had been represented by Republican Craig Haggard since 2022. Haggard was elected unopposed in 2022.

==== Republican primary ====
===== Candidates =====
====== Declared ======
- Craig Haggard, incumbent state representative

==== General election ====
===== Endorsements =====
Craig Haggard

Organizations

- Indiana Farm Bureau AgELECT PAC
- NRA Political Victory Fund

===== Results =====
General election
Party	Candidate	Votes	%
Republican	Craig Haggard (incumbent)	22,413	100.0
Total votes		22,413	100.0
Republican hold			

=== District 58 ===
The district had been represented by Republican Michelle Davis since 2020. Davis was re-elected unopposed in 2022.

==== Republican primary ====
===== Candidates =====
====== Declared ======
- Michelle Davis, incumbent state representative

==== Democratic primary ====
===== Candidates =====
====== Declared ======
- Sandy James

==== General election ====
===== Results =====
General election
Party	Candidate	Votes	%
Republican	Michelle Davis (incumbent)	18,731	67.4
Democratic	Sandy James	9,051	32.6
Total votes		27,782	100.0

=== District 59 ===
The district had been represented by Republican Ryan Lauer since 2018. Lauer was re-elected with 61.3% of the vote in 2022.

==== Republican primary ====
===== Candidates =====
====== Declared ======
- Ryan Lauer, incumbent state representative

==== Democratic primary ====
===== Candidates =====
====== Declared ======
- Ross Thomas

==== General election ====
===== Results =====
General election
Party	Candidate	Votes	%
Republican	Ryan Lauer (incumbent)	17,151	63.8
Democratic	Ross Thomas	9,711	36.2
Total votes		26,862	100.0
Republican hold			

=== District 60 ===
The district had been represented by Republican Peggy Mayfield since 2012. Mayfield was re-elected with 75.4% of the vote in 2022.

==== Republican primary ====
===== Candidates =====
====== Declared ======
- Peggy Mayfield, incumbent state representative

==== Democratic primary ====
===== Candidates =====
====== Declared ======
- Michelle Higgs

==== General election ====
===== Endorsements =====
Peggy Mayfield

Organizations

- Indiana Farm Bureau AgELECT PAC
- NRA Political Victory Fund

===== Results =====
General election
Party	Candidate	Votes	%
Republican	Peggy Mayfield (incumbent)	25,764	75.7
Democratic	Michelle Higgs	8,274	24.3
Total votes		34,038	100.0
Republican hold			

=== District 61 ===
The district had been represented by Democrat Matt Pierce since 2002. Pierce was re-elected unopposed in 2022.

==== Democratic primary ====
===== Candidates =====
====== Declared ======
- Matt Pierce, incumbent state representative

==== General election ====
===== Results =====
General election
Party	Candidate	Votes	%
Democratic	Matt Pierce (incumbent)	17,018	100.0
Total votes		17,018	100.0
Democratic hold			

=== District 62 ===
The district had been represented by Republican Dave Hall since 2022. Hall was elected with 50.1% of the vote in 2022.

==== Republican primary ====
===== Candidates =====
====== Declared ======
- Dave Hall, incumbent state representative

==== Democratic primary ====
===== Candidates =====
====== Declared ======
- Thomas Horrocks, Indiana National Guard chaplain

==== General election ====
===== Endorsements =====
Dave Hall

Organizations

- Indiana Farm Bureau AgELECT PAC
- NRA Political Victory Fund

===== Results =====
General election
Party	Candidate	Votes	%
Republican	Dave Hall (incumbent)	18,395	51.1
Democratic	Thomas Horrocks	17,586	48.9
Total votes		35,981	100.0
Republican hold			

=== District 63 ===
The district had been represented by Republican Shane Lindauer since his appointment in 2017. Lindauer was re-elected with 76.9% of the vote in 2022.

==== Republican primary ====
===== Candidates =====
====== Declared ======
- Shane Lindauer, incumbent state representative

==== Democratic primary ====
===== Candidates =====
====== Declared ======
- Teresa Kendall

==== General election ====
===== Endorsements =====
Shane Lindauer

Organizations

- Indiana Farm Bureau AgELECT PAC
- NRA Political Victory Fund

===== Results =====
General election
Party	Candidate	Votes	%
Republican	Shane Lindauer (incumbent)	21,651	76.3
Democratic	Teresa Kendall	6,709	23.7
Total votes		28,360	100.0
Republican hold			

=== District 64 ===
The district had been represented by Republican Matt Hostettler since 2018. Hostettler was re-elected unopposed in 2022.

==== Republican primary ====
===== Candidates =====
====== Declared ======
- Matt Hostettler, incumbent state representative
- Dale Mallory

===== Endorsements =====
Matt Hostettler

Organizations

- Indiana Right to Life
- NRA Political Victory Fund

===== Results =====
Republican primary
Party	Candidate	Votes	%
Republican	Matt Hostettler (incumbent)	5,544	67.8
Republican	Dale Mallory	2,635	32.2
Total votes		8,179	100.0

==== General election ====
===== Results =====
General election
Party	Candidate	Votes	%
Republican	Matt Hostettler (incumbent)	26,027	100.0
Total votes		26,027	100.0
Republican hold			

=== District 65 ===
The district had been represented by Republican Christopher May since 2016. May was re-elected with 77.7% of the vote in 2022.

==== Republican primary ====
===== Candidates =====
====== Declared ======
- Christopher May, incumbent state representative

==== General election ====
===== Endorsements =====
Chris May

Organizations

- Indiana Farm Bureau AgELECT PAC
- NRA Political Victory Fund

===== Results =====
General election
Party	Candidate	Votes	%
Republican	Christopher May (incumbent)	24,786	100.0
Total votes		24,786	100.0
Republican hold			

=== District 66 ===
The district had been represented by Republican Zach Payne since 2020. Payne was re-elected with 69.9% of the vote in 2022.

==== Republican primary ====
===== Candidates =====
====== Declared ======
- Jim Baker
- Zach Payne, incumbent state representative

===== Endorsements =====
Zach Payne

Organizations

- Indiana Farm Bureau AgELECT PAC
- Indiana Right to Life
- NRA Political Victory Fund

===== Results =====
Republican primary
Party	Candidate	Votes	%
Republican	Zach Payne (incumbent)	5,221	76.4
Republican	Jim Baker	1,613	23.6
Total votes		6,834	100.0

==== Democratic primary ====
===== Candidates =====
====== Declared ======
- Rick Cannon
- Jennifer David

===== Results =====
Democratic primary
Party	Candidate	Votes	%
Democratic	Jennifer David	1,416	67.7
Democratic	Rick Cannon	677	32.3
Total votes		2,093	100.0

==== General election ====
===== Results =====
General election
Party	Candidate	Votes	%
Republican	Zach Payne (incumbent)	22,507	69.4
Democratic	Jennifer David	9,926	30.6
Total votes		32,433	100.0
Republican hold			

=== District 67 ===
The district had been represented by Republican Randy Frye since 2010. Frye was re-elected unopposed in 2022. Frye announced he would retire effective July 8, 2023. Alex Zimmerman was elected via caucus to replace him.

==== Republican primary ====
===== Candidates =====
====== Declared ======
- Chad Meinders, farmer
- Alex Zimmerman, incumbent state representative

====== Declined ======
- Randy Frye, former state representative

===== Endorsements =====
Alex Zimmerman

Organizations

- Indiana Farm Bureau AgELECT PAC
- Indiana Right to Life
- NRA Political Victory Fund

===== Results =====
Republican primary
Party	Candidate	Votes	%
Republican	Alex Zimmerman (incumbent)	5,316	64.9
Republican	Chad Meinders	2,876	35.1
Total votes		8,192	100.0

==== General election ====
===== Results =====
General election
Party	Candidate	Votes	%
Republican	Alex Zimmerman (incumbent)	25,408	100.0
Total votes		25,408	100.0
Republican hold			

=== District 68 ===
The district had been represented by Republican Randy Lyness since his appointment in 2015. He was re-elected unopposed in 2022. Lyness announced he would retire at the end of his term.

==== Republican primary ====
===== Candidates =====
====== Declared ======
- Garrett Bascom, attorney

====== Declined ======
- Randy Lyness, incumbent state representative

==== Democratic primary ====
===== Candidates =====
====== Declared ======
- Lisa Barker

==== General election ====
===== Results =====
General election
Party	Candidate	Votes	%
Republican	Garrett Bascom	26,983	79.5
Democratic	Lisa Barker	6,970	20.5
Total votes		33,953	100.0
Republican hold			

=== District 69 ===
The district had been represented by Republican Jim Lucas since 2012. Lucas was re-elected with 73.7% of the vote in 2022. In May 2023, Lucas was arrested for operating a vehicle while intoxicated and leaving the scene of an accident. Lucas plead guilty to the two charges which are misdemeanors and therefore allowed him to keep his seat in the Indiana General Assembly. Lucas told The Hammer and Nigel Show of WIBC that he had no intention of resigning.

==== Republican primary ====
===== Candidates =====
====== Declared ======
- Jim Lucas, incumbent state representative
- Brian Savilla, former member of West Virginia House of Delegates

==== Endorsements ====
Jim Lucas

Organizations

- NRA Political Victory Fund

==== Results ====
Republican primary
Party	Candidate	Votes	%
Republican	Jim Lucas (incumbent)	4,584	57.5
Republican	Brian Savilla	3,390	42.5
Total votes		7,974	100.0

==== Democratic primary ====
===== Candidates =====
====== Declared ======
- Trish Whitcomb, former president of Indiana Federation of Democratic Women and 2012 campaign manager for Glenda Ritz

==== General election ====
===== Results =====
General election
Party	Candidate	Votes	%
Republican	Jim Lucas (incumbent)	18,438	68.7
Democratic	Trish Whitcomb	8,410	31.3
Total votes		26,848	100.0
Republican hold			

=== District 70 ===
The district had been represented by Republican Karen Engleman since 2016. Engleman was re-elected with 75% of the vote in 2022.

==== Republican primary ====
===== Candidates =====
====== Declared ======
- John D. Colburn
- Karen Engleman, incumbent state representative

==== Endorsements ====
Karen Engleman

Organizations

- Indiana Right to Life
- NRA Political Victory Fund

==== Results ====
Republican primary
Party	Candidate	Votes	%
Republican	Karen Engleman (incumbent)	6,079	68.9
Republican	John Colburn	2,739	31.1
Total votes		8,818	100.0

==== General election ====
===== Results =====
General election
Party	Candidate	Votes	%
Republican	Karen Engleman (incumbent)	25,765	73.4
Democratic	Sarah Blessing	9,325	26.6
Total votes		35,090	100.0
Republican hold			

=== District 71 ===
The district had been represented by Democrat Rita Fleming since 2018. Fleming was re-elected with 50.6% of the vote in 2022. Fleming retired from the General Assembly effective immediately one week after the primary. Wendy Dant Chesser was chosen to fulfill out the remainder of her term and is running for re-election.

==== Democratic primary ====
===== Candidates =====
====== Declared ======
- Rita Fleming, incumbent state representative

====== Endorsements ======
Rita Fleming

Organizations

- Indiana Farm Bureau AgELECT PAC

==== Republican primary ====
===== Candidates =====
====== Declared ======
- Scott Hawkins, Jeffersonville city councilor
- James McClure Jr.

==== Results ====
Republican primary
Party	Candidate	Votes	%
Republican	Scott Hawkins	3,209	78.3
Republican	James McClure	891	21.7
Total votes		4,100	100.0

==== General election ====
===== Results =====
General election
Party	Candidate	Votes	%
Democratic	Wendy Dant Chesser	14,413	49.6
Republican	Scott Hawkins	13,537	46.6
Libertarian	Greg Hertzsch	1,123	3.9
Total votes		29,073	100.0
Democratic hold			

=== District 72 ===
The district had been represented by Republican Edward Clere since 2008. Clere was re-elected with 60.4% of the vote in 2022.

==== Republican primary ====
===== Candidates =====
====== Declared ======
- Edward Clere, incumbent state representative

==== Democratic primary ====
===== Candidates =====
====== Declared ======
- Jason Applegate, small business owner

==== General election ====
===== Endorsements =====
Ed Clere

Organizations

- Indiana Farm Bureau AgELECT PAC
- NRA Political Victory Fund

===== Results =====
General election
Party	Candidate	Votes	%
Republican	Edward Clere (incumbent)	19,507	57.3
Democratic	Jason Applegate	14,553	42.7
Total votes		34,060	100.0
Republican hold			

=== District 73 ===
The district had been represented by Republican Jennifer Meltzer since 2022. Meltzer was elected with 77.1% in the vote in 2022.

==== Republican primary ====
===== Candidates =====
====== Declared ======
- Edward Comstock II
- Jennifer Meltzer, incumbent state representative

==== Endorsements ====
Jennifer Meltzer

Organizations

- Indiana Right to Life
- NRA Political Victory Fund

==== Results ====
Republican primary
Party	Candidate	Votes	%
Republican	Jennifer Meltzer (incumbent)	5,536	74.7
Republican	Edward Comstock II	1,871	25.3
Total votes		7,407	100.0

==== Democratic primary ====
===== Candidates =====
====== Declared ======
- Hollie Payton

==== General election ====
===== Results =====
General election
Party	Candidate	Votes	%
Republican	Jennifer Meltzer (incumbent)	20,900	76.9
Democratic	Hollie Payton	6,284	23.1
Total votes		27,184	100.0
Republican hold			

=== District 74 ===
The district had been represented by Republican Stephen Bartels since his appointment in 2017. Bartels was re-elected unopposed in 2022.

==== Republican primary ====
===== Candidates =====
====== Declared ======
- Stephen Bartels, incumbent state representative

==== Democratic primary ====
===== Candidates =====
====== Declared ======
- Bob Compton

==== General election ====
===== Endorsements =====
Stephen Bartels

Organizations

- Indiana Farm Bureau AgELECT PAC
- NRA Political Victory Fund

===== Results =====
General election
Party	Candidate	Votes	%
Republican	Stephen Bartels (incumbent)	21,681	68.6
Democratic	Bob Compton	9,944	31.4
Total votes		31,625	100.0
Republican hold			

=== District 75 ===
The district had been represented by Republican Cindy Ledbetter since 2020. Ledbetter was re-elected with 70.5% of the vote in 2022.

==== Republican primary ====
===== Candidates =====
====== Declared ======
- Cindy Ledbetter, incumbent state representative

==== General election ====
===== Endorsements =====
Cindy Ledbetter

Organizations

- Indiana Farm Bureau AgELECT PAC
- NRA Political Victory Fund

===== Results =====
General election
Party	Candidate	Votes	%
Republican	Cindy Ledbetter (incumbent)	26,617	100.0
Total votes		26,617	100.0
Republican hold			

== Districts 76–100 ==
=== District 76 ===
The district had been represented by Republican Wendy McNamara since 2010. McNamara was re-elected unopposed in 2022.

==== Republican primary ====
===== Candidates =====
====== Declared ======
- Wendy McNamara, incumbent state representative

==== General election ====
===== Endorsements =====
Wendy McNamara

Organizations

- Indiana Farm Bureau AgELECT PAC
- NRA Political Victory Fund

===== Results =====
General election
Party	Candidate	Votes	%
Republican	Wendy McNamara (incumbent)	25,585	100.0
Total votes		25,585	100.0
Republican hold			

=== District 77 ===
The district had been represented by Democrat Ryan Hatfield since 2016. He was re-elected with 76.7% of the vote in 2022. Hatfield decided not to run for another term.

==== Democratic primary ====
===== Candidates =====
====== Declared ======
- Alex Burton, Evansville city councilor

====== Declined ======
- Ryan Hatfield, incumbent state representative (running for Vanderburgh County Circuit Court Judge)

==== General election ====
===== Endorsements =====
Alex Burton

Organizations

- Indiana Farm Bureau AgELECT PAC

===== Results =====
General election
Party	Candidate	Votes	%
Democratic	Alex Burton	14,395	100.0
Total votes		14,395	100.0
Democratic hold			

=== District 78 ===
The district had been represented by Republican Tim O'Brien since his appointment in 2021. O'Brien was elected with 62.7% of the vote in 2022.

==== Republican primary ====
===== Candidates =====
====== Declared ======
- Tim O'Brien, incumbent state representative

==== General election ====
===== Endorsements =====
Tim O'Brien

Organizations

- Indiana Farm Bureau AgELECT PAC
- NRA Political Victory Fund

===== Results =====
General election
Party	Candidate	Votes	%
Republican	Tim O'Brien (incumbent)	24,110	100.0
Total votes		24,110	100.0
Republican hold			

=== District 79 ===
The district had been represented by Republican Matt Lehman since 2008. Lehman was re-elected unopposed in 2022.

==== Republican primary ====
===== Candidates =====
====== Declared ======
- Matt Lehman, incumbent state representative

==== General election ====
===== Endorsements =====
Matt Lehman

Organizations

- Indiana Farm Bureau AgELECT PAC
- NRA Political Victory Fund

===== Results =====
General election
Party	Candidate	Votes	%
Republican	Matt Lehman (incumbent)	23,426	100.0
Total votes		23,426	100.0
Republican hold			

=== District 80 ===
The district had been represented by Democrat Phil GiaQuinta since 2006. GiaQuinta was re-elected unopposed in 2022.

==== Democratic primary ====
===== Candidates =====
====== Declared ======
- Phil GiaQuinta, incumbent state representative

==== General election ====
===== Endorsements =====
Phil GiaQuinta

Organizations

- Indiana Farm Bureau AgELECT PAC

===== Results =====
General election
Party	Candidate	Votes	%
Democratic	Phil GiaQuinta (incumbent)	13,519	100.0
Total votes		13,519	100.0
Democratic hold			

=== District 81 ===
The district had been represented by Republican Martin Carbaugh since 2012. Carbaugh was re-elected with 99.7% of the vote in 2022.

==== Republican primary ====
===== Candidates =====
====== Declared ======
- Martin Carbaugh, incumbent state representative
- David Mervar

===== Endorsements =====
Martin Carbaugh

Organizations

- Indiana Right to Life
- NRA Political Victory Fund

===== Results =====
Republican primary
Party	Candidate	Votes	%
Republican	Martin Carbaugh (incumbent)	4,508	69.9
Republican	David Mervar	1,944	30.1
Total votes		7,407	100.0

==== Democratic primary ====
===== Candidates =====
====== Declared ======
- Abby Norden

==== General election ====
===== Results =====
General election
Party	Candidate	Votes	%
Republican	Martin Carbaugh (incumbent)	20,913	64.9
Democratic	Abby Norden	11,332	35.1
Total votes		32,245	100.0
Republican hold			

=== District 82 ===
The district had been represented by Democrat Kyle Miller since 2022. Miller was elected with 56.4% of the vote in 2022.

==== Democratic primary ====
===== Candidates =====
====== Declared ======
- Kyle Miller, incumbent state representative

==== Republican primary ====
===== Candidates =====
====== Declared ======
- Otto Bonahoom

==== General election ====
===== Results =====
General election
Party	Candidate	Votes	%
Democratic	Kyle Miller (incumbent)	14,151	100.0
Total votes		14,151	100.0
Democratic hold			

=== District 83 ===
The district had been represented by Republican Christopher Judy since 2014. Judy was re-elected unopposed in 2022.

==== Republican primary ====
===== Candidates =====
====== Declared ======
- Christopher Judy, incumbent state representative

==== Democratic primary ====
===== Candidates =====
====== Declared ======
- Kyle Thele, digital editor

==== General election ====
===== Endorsements =====
Chris Judy

Organizations

- Indiana Farm Bureau AgELECT PAC
- NRA Political Victory Fund

===== Results =====
General election
Party	Candidate	Votes	%
Republican	Christopher Judy (incumbent)	22,111	64.0
Democratic	Kyle Thele	12,426	36.0
Total votes		34,537	100.0
Republican hold			

=== District 84 ===
The district had been represented by Republican Bob Morris since 2010. Morris was re-elected unopposed in 2022.

==== Republican primary ====
===== Candidates =====
====== Declared ======
- Bob Morris, incumbent state representative

==== General election ====
===== Endorsements =====
Bob Morris

Organizations

- NRA Political Victory Fund

===== Results =====
General election
Party	Candidate	Votes	%
Republican	Bob Morris (incumbent)	21,927	100.0
Total votes		21,927	100.0
Republican hold			

=== District 85 ===
The district had been represented by Republican Dave Heine since 2016. Heine was re-elected unopposed in 2022.

==== Republican primary ====
===== Candidates =====
====== Declared ======
- Dave Heine, incumbent state representative

==== General election ====
===== Endorsements =====
Dave Heine

Organizations

- Indiana Farm Bureau AgELECT PAC
- NRA Political Victory Fund

===== Results =====
General election
Party	Candidate	Votes	%
Republican	Dave Heine (incumbent)	23,160	74.4
Democratic	Phil Goss	7,970	25.6
Total votes		31,130	100.0
Republican hold			

=== District 86 ===
The district had been represented by Democrat Ed DeLaney since 2008. DeLaney was re-elected with 71.3% of the vote in 2022.

==== Democratic primary ====
===== Candidates =====
====== Declared ======
- Ed DeLaney, incumbent state representative

==== General election ====
===== Results =====
General election
Party	Candidate	Votes	%
Democratic	Ed DeLaney (incumbent)	28,998	100.0
Total votes		28,998	100.0
Democratic hold			

=== District 87 ===
The district had been represented by Democrat Carey Hamilton since 2016. Hamilton was re-elected with 62.9% of the vote in 2022.

==== Democratic primary ====
===== Candidates =====
====== Declared ======
- Carey Hamilton, incumbent state representative

==== General election ====
===== Results =====
General election
Party	Candidate	Votes	%
Democratic	Carey Hamilton (incumbent)	25,517	100.0
Total votes		25,517	100.0
Democratic hold			

=== District 88 ===
The district had been represented by Republican Chris Jeter since 2020. Jeter was re-elected with 59.9% of the vote in 2022.

==== Republican primary ====
===== Candidates =====
====== Declared ======
- Chris Jeter, incumbent state representative

==== Democratic primary ====
===== Candidates =====
====== Declared ======
- Starr Joy Hairston
- Stephanie Jo Yocum

===== Results =====
Democratic primary
Party	Candidate	Votes	%
Democratic	Stephanie Yocum	1,271	67.3
Democratic	Starr Hairston	618	32.7
Total votes		1,889	100.0

==== General election ====
===== Endorsements =====
Chris Jeter

Organizations

- NRA Political Victory Fund

===== Results =====
General election
Party	Candidate	Votes	%
Republican	Chris Jeter (incumbent)	23,075	57.8
Democratic	Stephanie Yocum	16,838	42.2
Total votes		39,913	100.0
Republican hold			

=== District 89 ===
The district had been represented by Democrat Mitch Gore since 2020. Gore was re-elected with 51% of the vote in 2022.

==== Democratic primary ====
===== Candidates =====
====== Declared ======
- Mitch Gore, incumbent state representative

==== Republican primary ====
===== Candidates =====
====== Declared ======
- Yvonne Metcalfe

==== General election ====
===== Endorsements =====
Mitch Gore

Organizations

- Indiana Farm Bureau AgELECT PAC

===== Results =====
General election
Party	Candidate	Votes	%
Democratic	Mitch Gore (incumbent)	12,948	55.8
Republican	Yvonne Metcalfe	10,240	44.2
Total votes		23,188	100.0
Democratic hold			

=== District 90 ===
The district had been represented by Republican Mike Speedy since 2010. He was re-elected with 98.1% of the vote in 2022. Speedy decided to run for the vacant for U.S. House in 6th district.

==== Republican primary ====
===== Candidates =====
====== Declared ======
- Andrew Ireland, former deputy attorney general
- Tim McVey, employee for storage company
- David Waters, former pharmacist
- Elizabeth Williams, business owner

====== Declined ======
- Mike Speedy, incumbent state representative (running for U.S. House for 6th district)

===== Results =====
Republican primary
Party	Candidate	Votes	%
Republican	Andrew Ireland	2,382	38.2
Republican	Elizabeth Williams	2,299	36.7
Republican	Tim McVey	1,211	19.3
Republican	David Waters	361	5.8
Total votes		6,263	100.0

==== Democratic primary ====
===== Candidates =====
====== Declared ======
- Dominique Davie

==== General election ====
===== Endorsements =====
Andrew Ireland

Organizations

- NRA Political Victory Fund

===== Results =====
General election
Party	Candidate	Votes	%
Republican	Andrew Ireland	19,450	63.6
Democratic	Dominique Davie	11,124	36.4
Total votes		30,574	100.0
Republican hold			

=== District 91 ===
The district had been represented by Republican Robert Behning since 1992. Behning was re-elected unopposed in 2022.

==== Republican primary ====
===== Candidates =====
====== Declared ======
- Robert Behning, incumbent state representative

==== General election ====
===== Endorsements =====
Robert Behning

Organizations

- NRA Political Victory Fund

===== Results =====
General election
Party	Candidate	Votes	%
Republican	Robert Behning (incumbent)	13,723	60.1
Democratic	Andrew Locke	9,101	39.9
Total votes		22,824	100.0
Republican hold			

=== District 92 ===
The district had been represented by Democrat Renee Pack since 2020. Pack was re-elected unopposed in 2022.

==== Democratic primary ====
===== Candidates =====
====== Declared ======
- Renee Pack, incumbent state representative

==== Republican primary ====
===== Candidates =====
====== Declared ======
- John Couch, perennial candidate

==== General election ====
===== Results =====
General election
Party	Candidate	Votes	%
Democratic	Renee Pack (incumbent)	13,173	59.0
Republican	John Couch	9,144	41.0
Total votes		22,317	100.0
Democratic hold			

=== District 93 ===
The district had been represented by Republican Julie McGuire since 2022. McGuire was elected with 57.7% of the vote in 2022.

==== Republican primary ====
===== Candidates =====
====== Declared ======
- Julie McGuire, incumbent state representative

==== General election ====
===== Endorsements =====
Julie McGuire

Organizations

- NRA Political Victory Fund

===== Results =====
General election
Party	Candidate	Votes	%
Republican	Julie McGuire (incumbent)	13,562	62.2
Democratic	Ryan Hughey	8,258	37.8
Total votes		21,820	100.0
Republican hold			

=== District 94 ===
The district had been represented by Democrat Cherrish Pryor since 2008. Pryor was re-elected unopposed in 2022.

==== Democratic primary ====
===== Candidates =====
====== Declared ======
- Cherrish Pryor, incumbent state representative

==== General election ====
===== Endorsements =====
Cherrish Pryor

Organizations

- Indiana Farm Bureau AgELECT PAC

===== Results =====
General election
Party	Candidate	Votes	%
Democratic	Cherrish Pryor (incumbent)	18,772	100.0
Total votes		18,772	100.0
Democratic hold			

=== District 95 ===
The district had been represented by Democrat John Bartlett since 2008. Bartlett was re-elected unopposed in 2022.

==== Democratic primary ====
===== Candidates =====
====== Declared ======
- John Bartlett, incumbent state representative
- Autumn Carter, author and public speaker

===== Results =====
Democratic primary
Party	Candidate	Votes	%
Democratic	John Bartlett (incumbent)	1,943	57.7
Democratic	Autumn Carter	1,424	42.3
Total votes		3,367	100.0

==== General election ====
===== Endorsements =====
John Bartlett

Organizations

- Indiana Farm Bureau AgELECT PAC

===== Results =====
General election
Party	Candidate	Votes	%
Democratic	John Bartlett (incumbent)	17,901	100.0
Total votes		17,901	100.0
Democratic hold			

=== District 96 ===
The district had been represented by Democrat Greg Porter since 1992. Porter was re-elected unopposed in 2022.

==== Democratic primary ====
===== Candidates =====
====== Declared ======
- Greg Porter, incumbent state representative

====== Disqualified ======
- Deandra Thompson

==== General election ====
===== Endorsements =====
Greg Porter

Organizations

- Indiana Farm Bureau AgELECT PAC

===== Results =====
General election
Party	Candidate	Votes	%
Democratic	Greg Porter (incumbent)	25,952	100.0
Total votes		25,952	100.0
Democratic hold			

=== District 97 ===
The district had been represented by Democrat Justin Moed since 2012. Moed was re-elected with 58.8% of the vote in 2022.

==== Democratic primary ====
===== Candidates =====
====== Declared ======
- Justin Moed, incumbent state representative
- Sarah Shydale

===== Results =====
Democratic primary
Party	Candidate	Votes	%
Democratic	Justin Moed (incumbent)	967	76.3
Democratic	Sarah Shydale	300	23.7
Total votes		1,267	100.0

==== Republican primary ====
===== Candidates =====
====== Declared ======
- Stephen Whitmer

==== Libertarian convention ====
===== Candidates =====
====== Declared ======
- Mark Renholzberger

==== General election ====
===== Endorsements =====
Justin Moed

Organizations

- Indiana Farm Bureau AgELECT PAC
Stephen Whitmer

Organizations

- NRA Political Victory Fund

===== Results =====
General election
Party	Candidate	Votes	%
Democratic	Justin Moed (incumbent)	8,831	58.2
Republican	Stephen Whitmer	5,907	38.9
Libertarian	Mark Renholzberger	429	2.8
Total votes		15,167	100.0
Democratic hold			

=== District 98 ===
The district had been represented by Democrat Robin Shackleford since 2012. Shackleford was re-elected unopposed in 2022.

==== Democratic primary ====
===== Candidates =====
====== Declared ======
- Robin Shackleford, incumbent state representative

==== Libertarian convention ====
===== Candidates =====
====== Declared ======
- Elizabeth (Libby) Glass

==== General election ====
===== Results =====
General election
Party	Candidate	Votes	%
Democratic	Robin Shackleford (incumbent)	14,781	89.1
Libertarian	Elizabeth Glass	1,817	10.9
Total votes		16,598	100.0
Democratic hold			

=== District 99 ===
The district had been represented by Democrat Vanessa Summers since her appointment in 1991. Summers was re-elected with 82.6% of the vote in 2022.

==== Democratic primary ====
===== Candidates =====
====== Declared ======
- Vanessa Summers, incumbent state representative

====== Withdrawn ======
- Edward Rogers

==== Republican primary ====
===== Candidates =====
====== Declared ======
- Felipe Rios

==== General election ====
===== Results =====
General election
Party	Candidate	Votes	%
Democratic	Vanessa Summers (incumbent)	13,661	81.3
Republican	Felipe Rios	3,151	18.7
Total votes		16,812	100.0
Democratic hold			

=== District 100 ===
The district had been represented by Democrat Blake Johnson since his appointment 2020. Johnson was re-elected unopposed in 2022.

==== Democratic primary ====
===== Candidates =====
====== Declared ======
- Blake Johnson, incumbent state representative

==== Republican primary ====
===== Candidates =====
====== Declared ======
- Joseph Bortka

==== General election ====
===== Results =====
General election
Party	Candidate	Votes	%
Democratic	Blake Johnson (incumbent)	16,667	71.7
Republican	Joseph Bortka	6,585	28.3
Total votes		23,252	100.0
Democratic hold			
