= Gutwein =

Gutwein is a surname of German origin literally meaning "good wine". Notable people with the surname include:

- Douglas Gutwein, American politician
- Peter Gutwein (born 1964), Australian politician
