= Brian Savilla =

American politician

Member of the West Virginia House of Delegates from the 14th district
- In office 2011 – December 1, 2012

Personal details
- Born: Charleston, West Virginia
- Party: Republican
- Education: Poca High School
- Alma mater: West Virginia State University

Brian Savilla is an American politician from West Virginia. He is a Republican and represented District 14 in the West Virginia House of Delegates.

Savilla worked as a teacher in Brownsville, Indiana. Savilla was a candidate for District 69 in the 2024 Indiana House of Representatives election. Savilla supports term limits.
