= Cindy Ziemke =

American politician from Indiana

Member of the Indiana House of Representatives from the 55th district
- In office 2012–2022
- Succeeded by: Lindsay Patterson

Personal details
- Party: Republican

Cindy Ziemke is a member of the Indiana House of Representatives, representing the 55th District. She is a Republican who was first elected to the House in 2012. She retired from political life in 2022.

== Committee assignments ==
- Family, Children and Human Affairs (Vice Chair)
- Commerce, Small Business and Economic Development
- Select Committee on Government Reduction
