= Sharon Negele =

American politician from Indiana

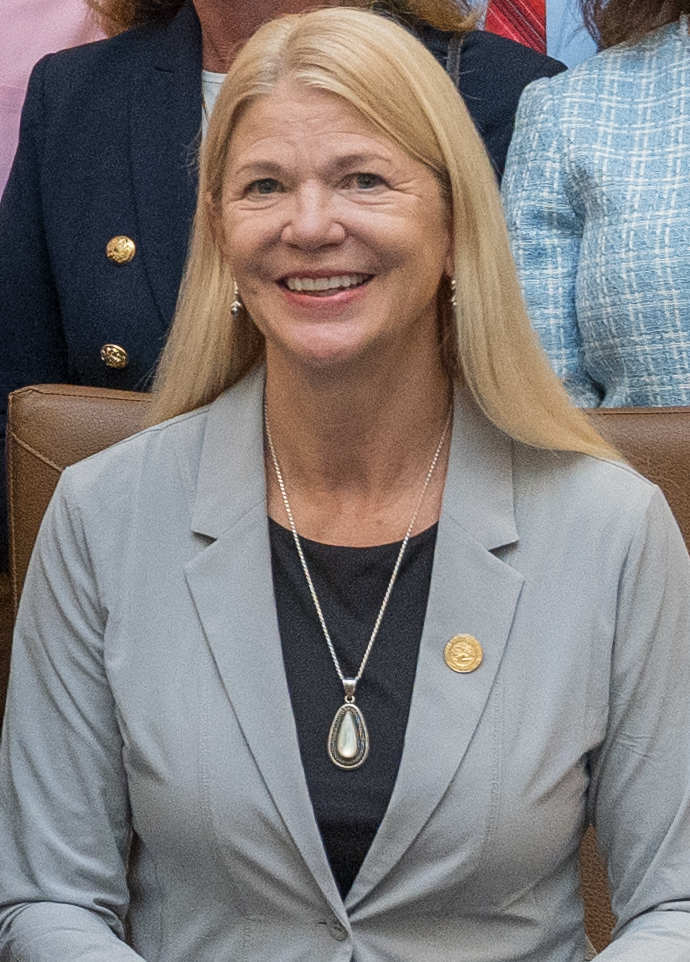

Member of the Indiana House of Representatives from the 13th district
- In office January 2013 – November 18, 2024
- Preceded by: Chester Dobis
- Succeeded by: Matt Commons

Personal details
- Party: Republican
- Spouse: Dennis McIntosh
- Children: 2
- Education: Western Michigan University (BA); University of Houston (MBA)

Sharon Negele is an American politician. Negele was a Republican member of the Indiana House of Representatives from House District 13.

== Early life ==
Negele was born in Michigan.

== Education ==
In 1982, Negele earned a Bachelor of Arts degree in Finance and Economics from Western Michigan University. In 1990, Negele earned an MBA degree in finance from the University of Houston.

== Career ==
Negele is a small business owner.

On November 6, 2012, Negele won the election and became a Republican member of Indiana House of Representatives for District 13. Negele defeated Dan Young. On November 4, 2014, as an incumbent, Negele won the election unopposed and continued serving District 13. Negele lost her bid for re-election in the 2024 Republican primary.

== Personal life ==
Negele's husband is Dennis McIntosh. They have two children. Negele and her family live in Attica, Indiana.
