= Dan Leonard =

American politician from Indiana

Member of the Indiana House of Representatives from the 50th district
- In office November 19, 2002 – November 22, 2022
- Preceded by: Gary P. Dillon
- Succeeded by: Lorissa Sweet

Personal details
- Born: March 18, 1949 (age 77)
- Party: Republican
- Spouse: Lydia Sanders
- Children: Four
- Profession: businessman

Daniel J. Leonard (born March 18, 1949) is an American politician. He was a member of the Indiana House of Representatives from the 50th District, serving from 2002 until 2022. A businessman, he is a member of the Republican party. In May 2022, Leonard lost his renomination bid for the State House to Lorissa Sweet.
