= Ethan Lawson =

American politician

Member of the Indiana House of Representatives from the 53rd district
- Incumbent
- Assumed office November 19, 2024
- Preceded by: Bob Cherry

Personal details
- Party: Republican
- Education: Western Governors University (BA), (MBA)

Ethan Lawson is an American politician serving as a member of the Indiana House of Representatives from the 53rd district. He assumed office on November 19, 2024.

== Career ==
Lawson works for the Indiana National Guard. He won the 2024 general election gathering 70% of the vote.

== Personal life ==
Lawson is married to Holly and lives in Greenfield and attends Otterbein Methodist Church.
