= Donald Lehe =

American politician from Indiana

Member of the Indiana House of Representatives from the 25th district
- In office November 7, 2012 – November 8, 2022
- Preceded by: Jeb Bardon
- Succeeded by: Becky Cash

Member of the Indiana House of Representatives from the 15th district
- In office November 6, 2002 – November 7, 2012
- Preceded by: Dan Dumezich
- Succeeded by: Hal Slager

Personal details
- Party: Republican
- Spouse: Kathy
- Education: Purdue University
- Occupation: Politician / Farmer

Donald Lehe is a former Republican member of the Indiana House of Representatives, representing the 25th District since 2012 and the 15th district from 2002 to 2012. In 2006, Lehe retained his seat, garnering only 26 votes more than his challenger. Lehe chose to retire and not run for re-election in 2022.
