= Lindsay Patterson =

American politician

Member of the Indiana House of Representatives from the 55th district
- Incumbent
- Assumed office November 22, 2022
- Preceded by: Cindy Ziemke

Personal details
- Born: Brookville, Indiana, U.S.
- Party: Republican
- Education: University of Cincinnati (AS); Indiana University (BA)

Lindsay Patterson is an American politician serving as a member of the Indiana House of Representatives from the 55th district. She assumed office on November 22, 2022.

== Career ==
Patterson graduated from University of Cincinnati with an associate degree in dental hygiene and Indiana University with a bachelor's degree in business in 2009. She worked as a dental hygienist prior to being elected.

== Personal life ==
Patterson was born in Brookville, Indiana and currently resides on a farm in Franklin County, Indiana. She lives with her husband and two sons.
