= Bradford Barrett =

American politician and physician

Brad Barrett
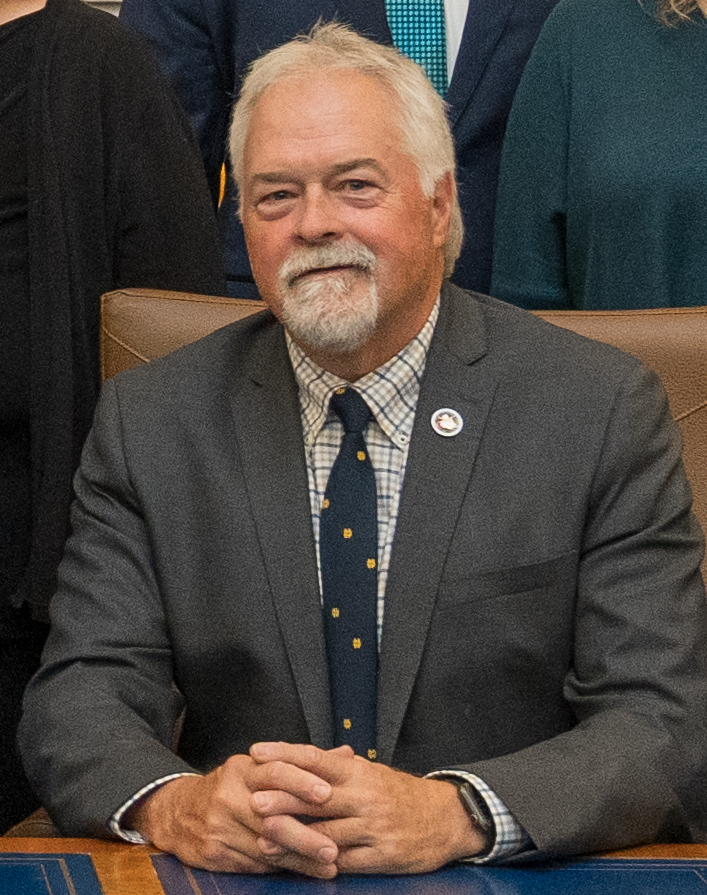
- Barrett in 2024

Member of the Indiana House of Representatives from the 56th district
- Incumbent
- Assumed office November 7, 2018
- Preceded by: Richard Hamm

Personal details
- Born: Bradford Barrett
- Party: Republican
- Spouse: Mary Ann
- Children: 2
- Education: University of Notre Dame (BS); Ohio State University (MD)

Bradford "Brad" J. Barrett is an American politician and physician serving as a member of the Indiana House of Representatives from the 56th district. He assumed office on November 7, 2018.

== Education ==
Barrett earned a Bachelor of Science degree in professional studies from the University of Notre Dame and a Doctor of Medicine from the Ohio State University College of Medicine.

== Career ==
From 1988 to 1993, Barrett worked as an intern and resident at Indiana University Health University Hospital. He was the president and owner of General Surgeons from 1993 to 2017 and also worked as chief of surgery for Reid Hospital. He was elected to the Indiana House of Representatives in November 2018. Barrett has also served as vice chair and chair of the House Public Health Committee.
