= Tony Isa =

American politician

Member of the Indiana House of Representatives from the 51st district
- Incumbent
- Assumed office November 19, 2024
- Preceded by: Dennis Zent

Personal details
- Party: Republican

Tony Isa is an American politician and realtor serving as a member of the Indiana House of Representatives from the 51st district. He assumed office on November 19, 2024.

== Career ==
Isa is a realtor and a small business owner. He owns a local ice cream shop named Scoop's Ice Cream in Angola. Additionally, he previously served on the Steuben County council from 2020 until his election in 2024.

== Personal life ==
Isa and his wife, Desiree, live in Angola and have three children.
