= Alaina Shonkwiler =

American politician

Member of the Indiana House of Representatives from the 29th district
- Incumbent
- Assumed office November 19, 2024
- Preceded by: Chuck Goodrich

Personal details
- Born: 1982 or 1983 (age 42–43) Indianapolis, Indiana
- Party: Republican
- Education: Indiana University (BA); North Central University (MS)

Alaina Shonkwiler (born 1983) is an American politician serving as a member of the Indiana House of Representatives from the 29th district. She assumed office on November 19, 2024.

== Career ==
Shonkwiler previously worked for U.S. representative Victoria Spartz as a district director and as a government advisory for an accounting firm.

== Personal life ==
Shonkwiler is married to Jason and lives in Noblesville with their two children.
