= Tim O'Brien (Indiana politician) =

Indiana politician

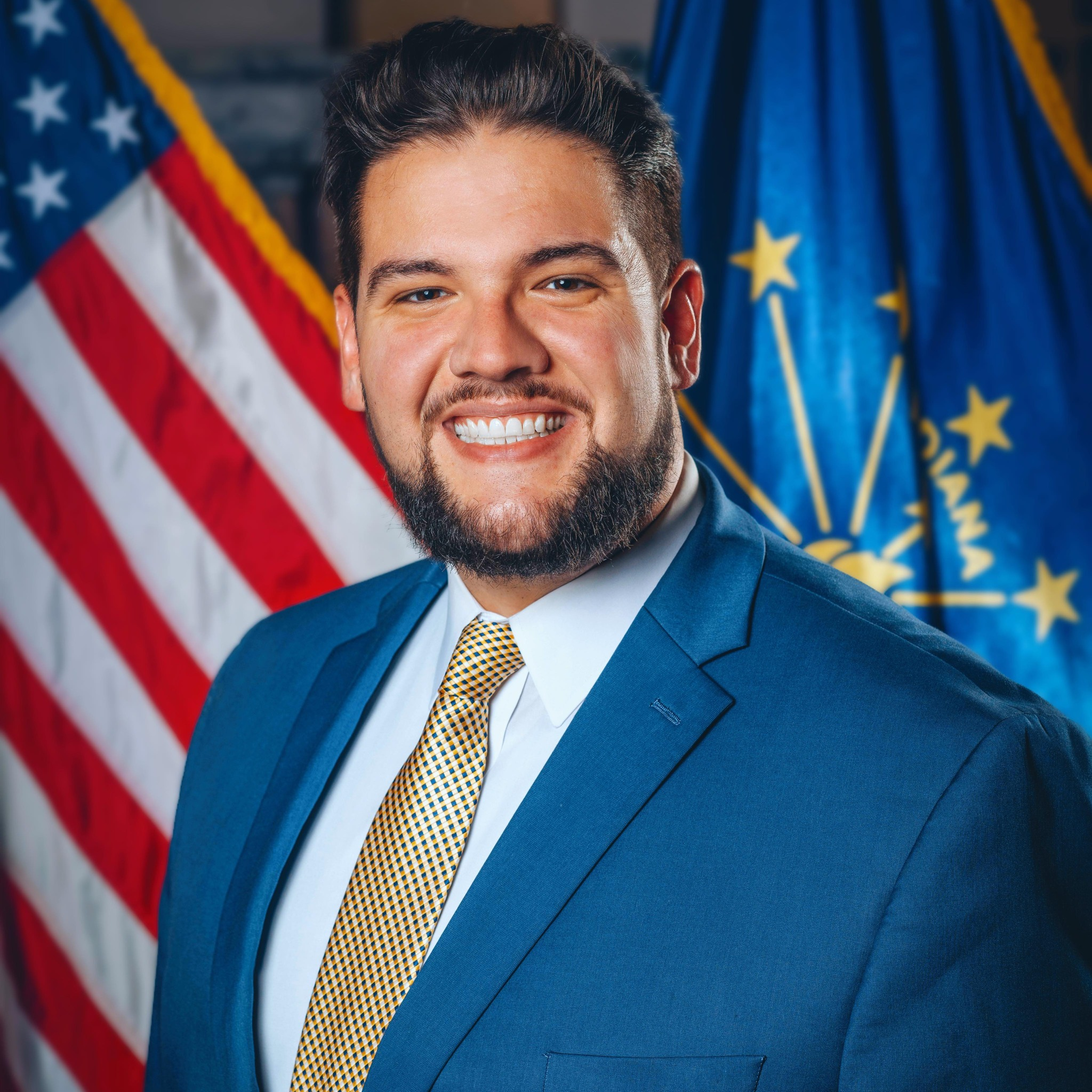

Member of the Indiana House of Representatives from the 78th district
- Incumbent
- Assumed office March 30, 2021
- Preceded by: Holli Sullivan

Personal details
- Born: Hobart, Indiana, U.S.
- Party: Republican
- Education: University of Southern; Indiana (BA)

Timothy "Tim" O'Brien is an American politician and businessman serving as a member of the Indiana House of Representatives from the 78th district. He assumed office on March 30, 2021.

== Early life and education ==
O'Brien was born in Hobart, Indiana. He earned a Bachelor of Arts degree in economics from the University of Southern Indiana in 2015.

== Career ==
Outside of politics, O'Brien works as a real estate agent and broker. In 2019, he became president of the Southwest Indiana Association of Realtors. In 2019, O'Brien ran unsuccessfully for the Evansville City Council. He was elected to the Indiana House of Representatives in a March 2021 special election.
