= Martin Carbaugh =

American politician from Indiana

Member of the Indiana House of Representatives from the 81st district
- Incumbent
- Assumed office November 20, 2012
- Preceded by: Winfield Moses

Personal details
- Born: October 28, 1979 (age 46) Fort Wayne, Indiana
- Party: Republican

Martin Carbaugh (born October 28, 1979) is an American politician who has served in the Indiana House of Representatives from the 81st district since 2012.
