= Garrett Bascom =

American politician

Member of the Indiana House of Representatives from the 68th district
- Incumbent
- Assumed office November 19, 2024
- Preceded by: Randy Lyness

Personal details
- Party: Republican
- Education: Mount St. Joseph University (BA); Indiana University (JD)

Garrett Bascom is an American politician and lawyer serving as a member of the Indiana House of Representatives from the 68th district. He assumed office on November 19, 2024.

== Early life and education ==
Bascom earned his bachelor's degree from Mount St. Joseph University and his J.D. degree from Indiana University.

== Career ==
Bascom previously served in the Indiana Attorney General's office and as the deputy prosecutor in Dearborn County. He started his own private law practice in 2023.

== Elections ==
=== 2024 ===
Indiana House District 68 Republican primary, May 7, 2024
Party	Candidate	Votes	%
Republican	Garrett Bascom	6,000	100.0
Total votes		6,000	100.0

Indiana House District 68 general election, November 5, 2024
Party	Candidate	Votes	%
Republican	Garrett Bascom	26,983	79.5
Democratic	Lisa Barker	6,970	20.5
Total votes		33,953	100.0

=== 2026 ===
Indiana House District 68 Republican primary, May 5, 2026
Party	Candidate	Votes	%
Republican	Garrett Bascom (incumbent)	6,895	100.0
Total votes		6,895	100.0

Indiana House District 68 general election, November 3, 2026 (unofficial results)
Party	Candidate	Votes	%
Republican	Garrett Bascom (incumbent)	14,366	73.1
Democratic	Hunter Collins	5,281	26.9
Total votes		19,647	100.0
