= Douglas Gutwein =

American politician from Indiana (1948–2023)

Member of the Indiana House of Representatives from the 16th district
- In office 2008–2022
- Preceded by: Eric Gutwein
- Succeeded by: Kendell Culp

Personal details
- Born: April 4, 1948 Francesville, Indiana, U.S.
- Died: December 1, 2023 (aged 75)
- Party: Republican
- Spouse: Mary
- Occupation: Politician

Douglas Lynn Gutwein (April 4, 1948 – December 1, 2023) was an American politician who was a Republican member of the Indiana House of Representatives, representing the 16th District from 2008 to 2022. He supported "right-to-work" legislation in Indiana. He retired in 2022.

== Early life ==
Gutwein was born in Francesville, Indiana on April 4, 1948. After graduating from high school, Gutwein served in the US Army for 3 years. During his 3 years he was stationed in Frankfort, Germany and Vietnam. After his service, Gutwein decided to become a city mail carrier in Valparaiso and California.

== 1979 ==
In 1979 Gutwein returned to Francesville to run his brother's company. Gutwein, several years later, bought out his brother's company.

== 1992 ==
In 1992 Gutwein was voted president of the town board. The board's main focuses and accomplishments consisted of reformation of zoning laws, a sewer system, an expansion of the public library and increased funding through the Build Indiana program. With the extra money, the board was able to expand not only the size of the town hall but also the police department, the water and sewer department, and the fire department.

== Organizations ==
Gutwein was a member of the American Legion.

== Personal life and death ==
Gutwein and his wife Mary Lew were married for 33 years. Together the two had two children and three grandchildren. Gutwein died from cancer on December 1, 2023, at the age of 75.
