= Craig Haggard =

American politician

Member of the Indiana House of Representatives from the 57th district
- In office November 9, 2022 – November 4, 2026
- Preceded by: Sean Eberhart

Personal details
- Born: Mooresville, Indiana, U.S.
- Party: Republican
- Spouse: Brooke Haggard
- Children: 4
- Education: Hanover College (BA)

Craig Haggard is an American politician. A Republican, he represents District 57 in the Indiana House of Representatives.

== Life and career ==
Haggard was raised in Mooresville, Indiana. He attended Mooresville High School, graduating in 1987. He's married to Brooke Haggard and has four children.

Haggard served in the United States Marine Corps for twelve years, and was formerly in the Indiana National Guard retiring with the rank of Lieutenant colonel.

In May 2022, Haggard defeated Melinda Griesemer in the Republican primary election for the 57th district of the Indiana House of Representatives. No candidate was nominated to challenge him in the general election. He succeeded Sean Eberhart.

In 2025, Haggard declared his candidacy to run for Indiana's 4th congressional district in the 2026 election.
