= Lori Goss-Reaves =

American politician

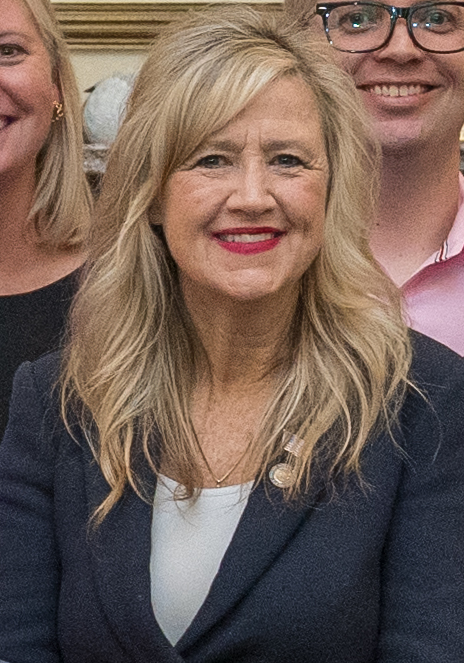

Member of the Indiana House of Representatives from the 31st district
- Incumbent
- Assumed office June 1, 2023
- Preceded by: Ann Vermilion

Personal details
- Party: Republican
- Spouse: Eric
- Children: 5
- Education: Ball State University (BS) Indiana University–Purdue University Indianapolis (MSW) Capella University (DSW)

Lori Goss-Reaves is an American politician serving as a member of the Indiana House of Representatives from the 31st district. She assumed office on June 1, 2023.

== Career ==
Goss-Reaves earned a bachelor's degree from Ball State University in 1988. She went on to earn her master's of social work and doctorate of social work from Indiana University–Purdue University Indianapolis and Capella University, respectively. Goss-Reaves' career experience includes working as a social worker and as a professor Indiana Wesleyan University

== Personal life ==
Goss-Reaves is married to her husband, Eric, and has five children. She is daughter of a Navy Corspman who was killed in action of the Vietnam War. She authored a book titled "Kiss Lori for Me" about her father and his experience in the war. She and her husband live in Marion, Indiana.

== Published works ==
- Goss-Reaves, Dr. Lori (2022). Kiss Lori for Me. Patagonia Press. ISBN 978-1736562932.
