= Christopher Judy =

American politician from Indiana

Member of the Indiana House of Representatives from the 83rd district
- Incumbent
- Assumed office September 22, 2014
- Preceded by: Kathy Heuer

Personal details
- Born: May 24, 1978 (age 48) Wabash, Indiana, U.S.
- Party: Republican

Christopher Judy (born May 24, 1978) is an American politician. A Republican, he has served in the Indiana House of Representatives from the 83rd district since 2014.
