= Kyle Miller (politician) =

American politician

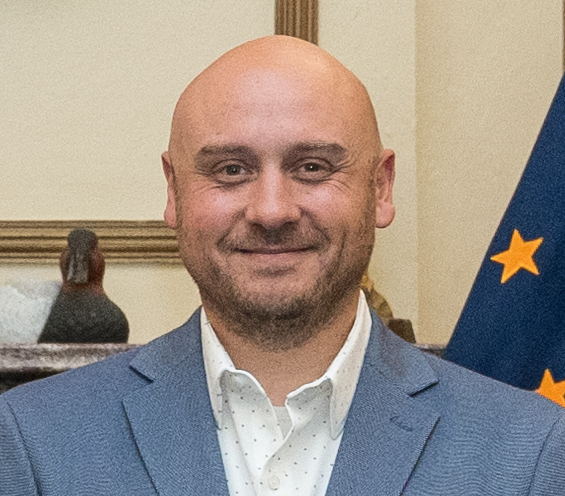

Member of the Indiana House of Representatives from the 82nd district
- Incumbent
- Assumed office November 9, 2022

Personal details
- Party: Democratic

Kyle Miller is an American politician. He serves as a Democratic member for the 82nd district of the Indiana House of Representatives.
