= Mark Genda =

American politician

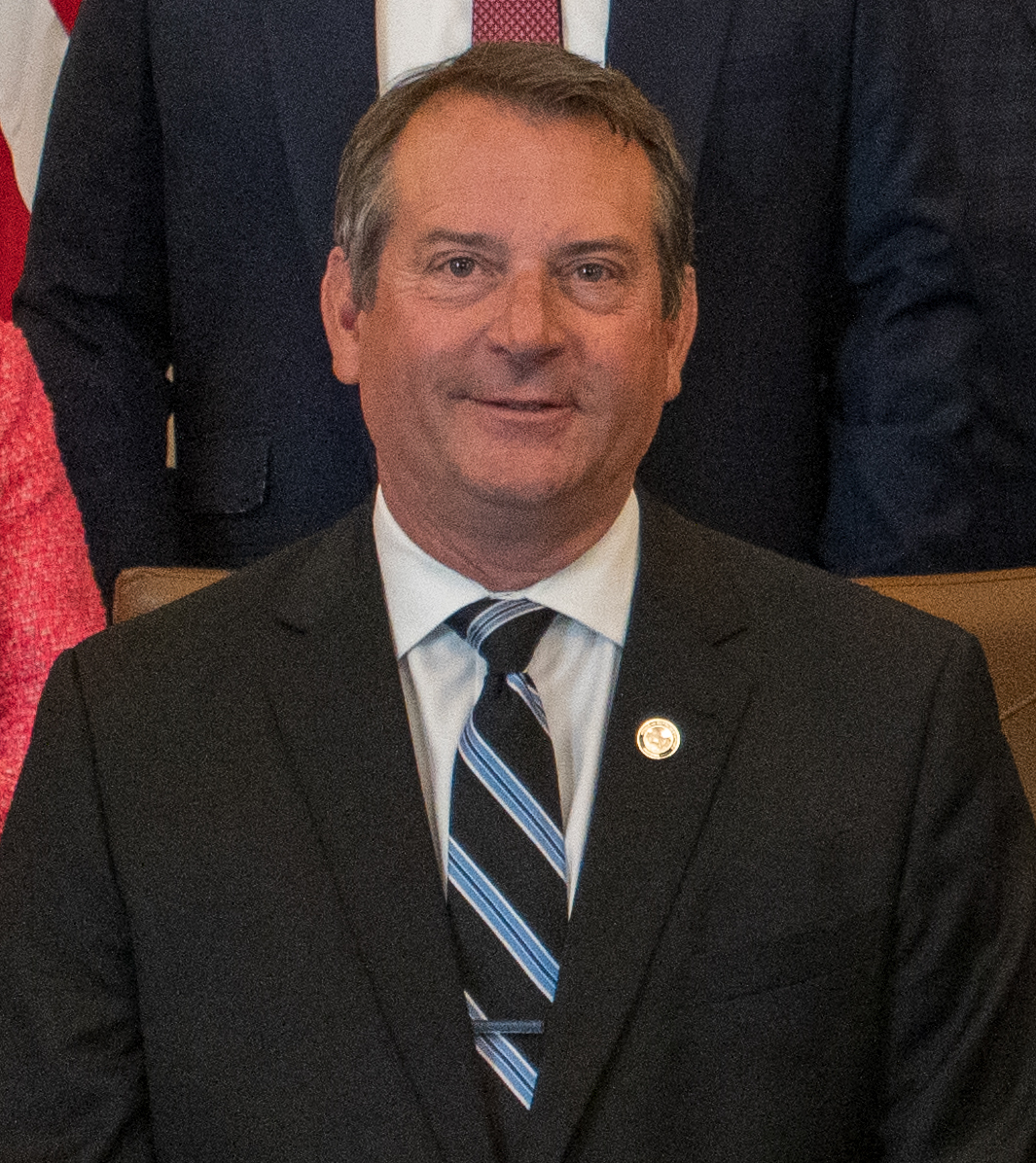

Member of the Indiana House of Representatives from the 41st district
- Incumbent
- Assumed office November 22, 2022
- Preceded by: Tim Brown

Personal details
- Born: Frankfort, Indiana
- Party: Republican
- Education: Worsham College of Mortuary Science

Mark Genda is an American politician serving as a member of the Indiana House of Representatives from the 41st district. He assumed office on November 9, 2022.

== Career ==
Genda graduated from the Worsham College of Mortuary Science with an associate degree in mortuary science in 1984. He was the former owner and funeral director of Genda Funeral Homes. After Genda was sworn into office, it was announced that Genda sold his funeral homes and would focus on his political career.

== Personal life ==
Genda was born and currently lives in Frankfort, Indiana.
