= Jennifer Meltzer =

American politician

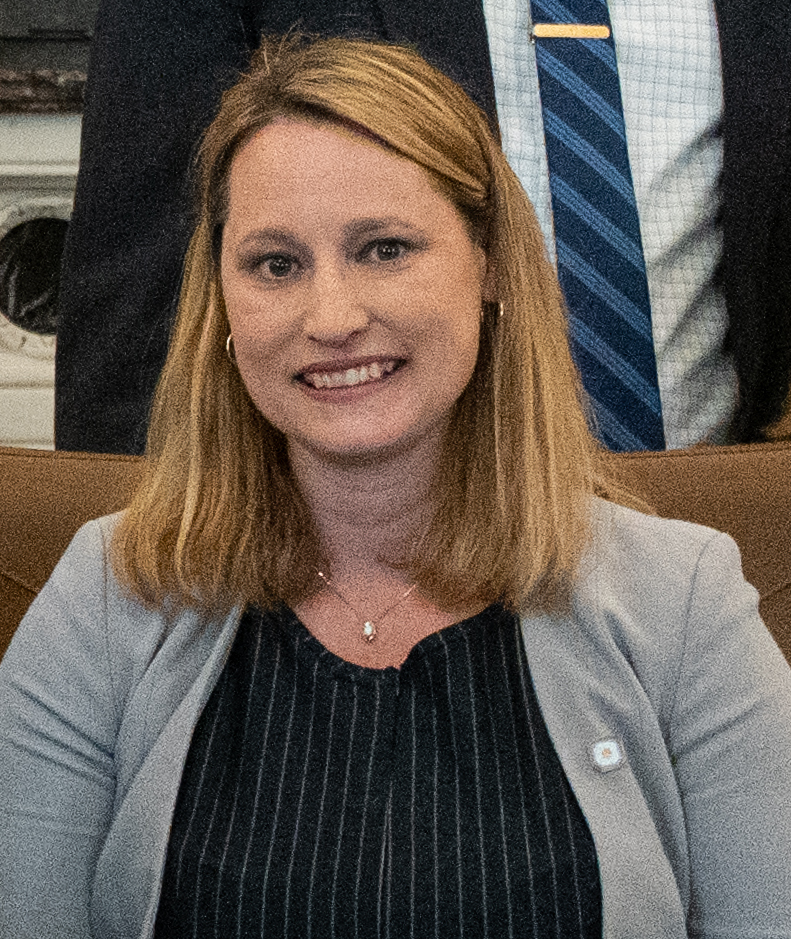

Member of the Indiana House of Representatives from the 73rd district
- Incumbent
- Assumed office November 22, 2022
- Preceded by: J. Michael Davisson

Personal details
- Born: Toledo, Ohio, U.S.
- Party: Republican
- Education: Xavier University (BS); Indiana University (JD)

Jennifer Meltzer is an American politician serving as a member of the Indiana House of Representatives from the 73rd district. She assumed office on November 22, 2022.

== Career ==
Meltzer graduated from Xavier University with a bachelor's degree in psychology in 2006 and a Juris Doctor degree from Indiana University in 2009. She is a former Shelbyville City Attorney and former Indiana Deputy Attorney General.

== Personal life ==
Meltzer lives in Shelbyville with her husband, Trent, and children, June, Rose, and Pearl. Meltzer is Catholic.
