= Stephen Bartels =

American politician

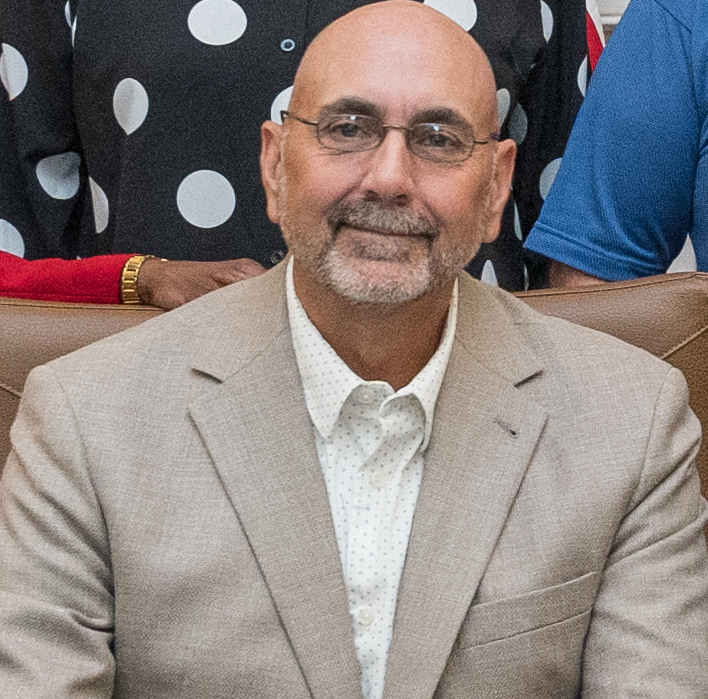

Member of the Indiana House of Representatives from the 74th district
- Incumbent
- Assumed office November 16, 2017
- Preceded by: Lloyd Arnold

Personal details
- Born: Indiana, U.S.
- Party: Republican

Military service
- Branch/service: United States Army
- Unit: Army National Guard

Stephen R. Bartels is an American politician serving as a member of the Indiana House of Representatives from the 74th district. He assumed office on November 16, 2017.

== Early life and education ==
Bartels was born and raised in Southern Indiana. He attended Indiana State University and Vincennes University, but did not earn a degree.

== Career ==
Bartels served in the Army National Guard, reaching the rank of major. He later served as a patrolman in the Terre Haute Police Department. Bartels owns the Patoka Lake Marina and Patoka Lake Winery. He was appointed to the Indiana House of Representatives in November 2017.
