= Kendell Culp =

American politician

Member of the Indiana House of Representatives from the 16th district
- Incumbent
- Assumed office November 22, 2022
- Preceded by: Douglas Gutwein

Personal details
- Party: Republican
- Education: Purdue University

Kendell Culp is an American politician serving as a member of the Indiana House of Representatives from the 16th district. He assumed office on November 22, 2022.

== Career ==
Culp graduated from Purdue University. He has been a farmer since 1978 and harvesting soybeans, corn, wheat, and raising beef cattle. In January 2016, he became the vice president of the Indiana Farm Bureau.

== Personal life ==
Culp lives in Rensselaer with his wife, Tammy, and his son, Brandon. He is a member of Trinity United Methodist Church.
