= Dennis Zent =

American politician from Indiana

Member of the Indiana House of Representatives from the 51st district
- In office November 20, 2012 – November 18, 2024
- Preceded by: Dick Dodge
- Succeeded by: Tony Isa

Personal details
- Born: September 11, 1948 (age 77)
- Party: Republican

Dennis Zent (born September 11, 1948) is an American politician who served in the Indiana House of Representatives from the 51st district from 2012 to 2024.
