= Dave Heine =

American politician from Indiana (born 1957)

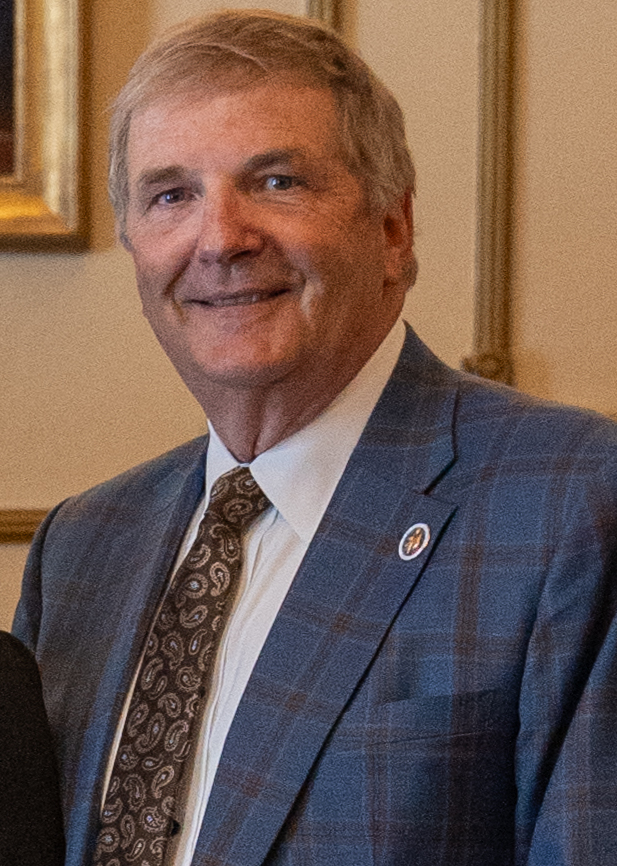

Member of the Indiana House of Representatives from the 85th district
- Incumbent
- Assumed office November 22, 2016
- Preceded by: Casey Cox

Personal details
- Born: January 16, 1957 (age 69) Fort Wayne, Indiana, U.S.
- Party: Republican

Dave Heine (born January 16, 1957) is an American politician and farmer who has served in the Indiana House of Representatives from the 85th district since 2016.

He graduated from Indiana University with a B.S. in accounting in 1979.

He is owner of Heine Farms.
