= Jim Pressel =

American politician from Indiana

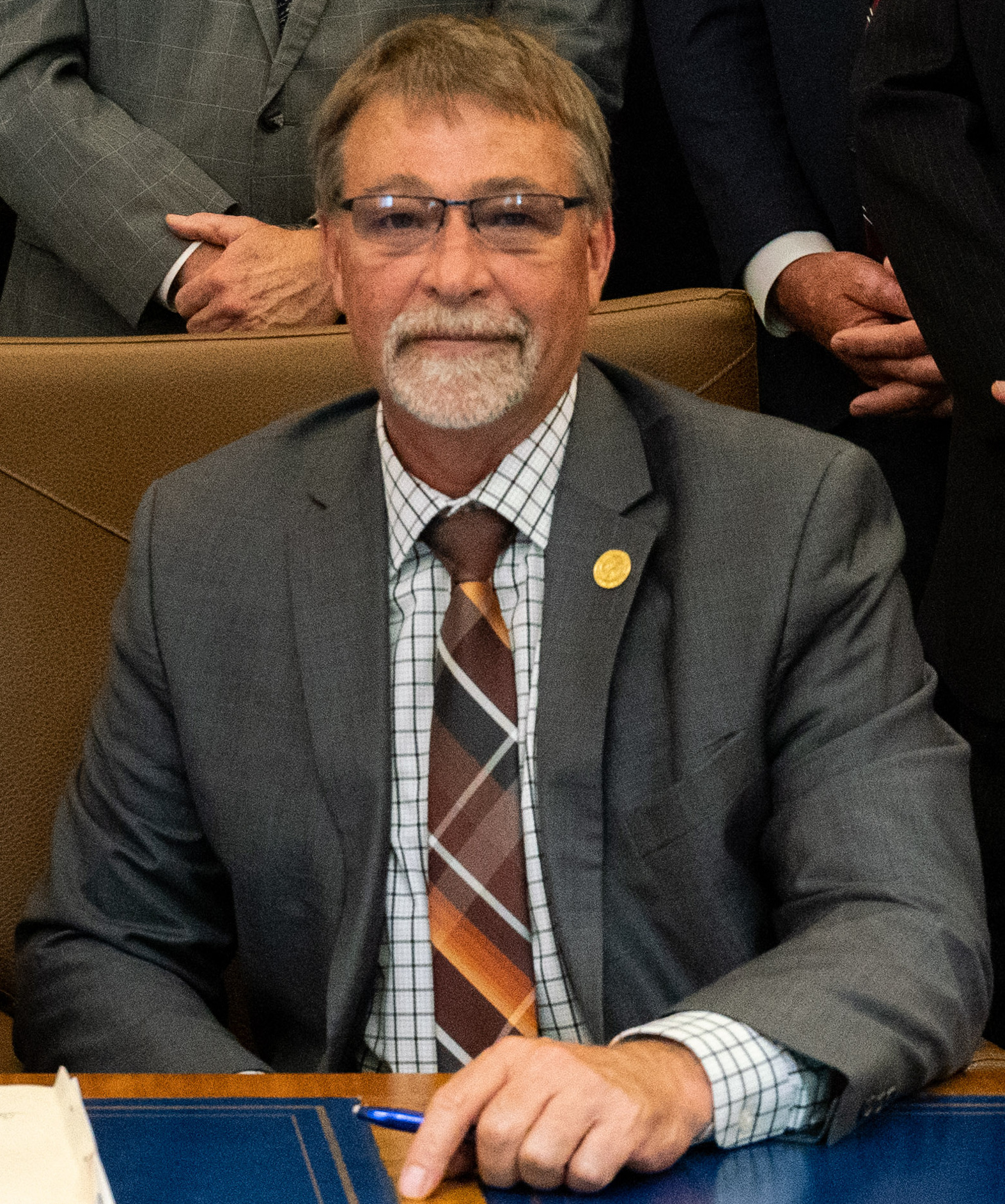

Member of the Indiana House of Representatives from the 20th district
- Incumbent
- Assumed office November 22, 2016
- Preceded by: Tom Dermody

Personal details
- Born: July 19, 1963 (age 63)
- Party: Republican

Jim Pressel (born July 19, 1963) is an American politician who has served in the Indiana House of Representatives from the 20th district since 2016.
