= Becky Cash =

American politician

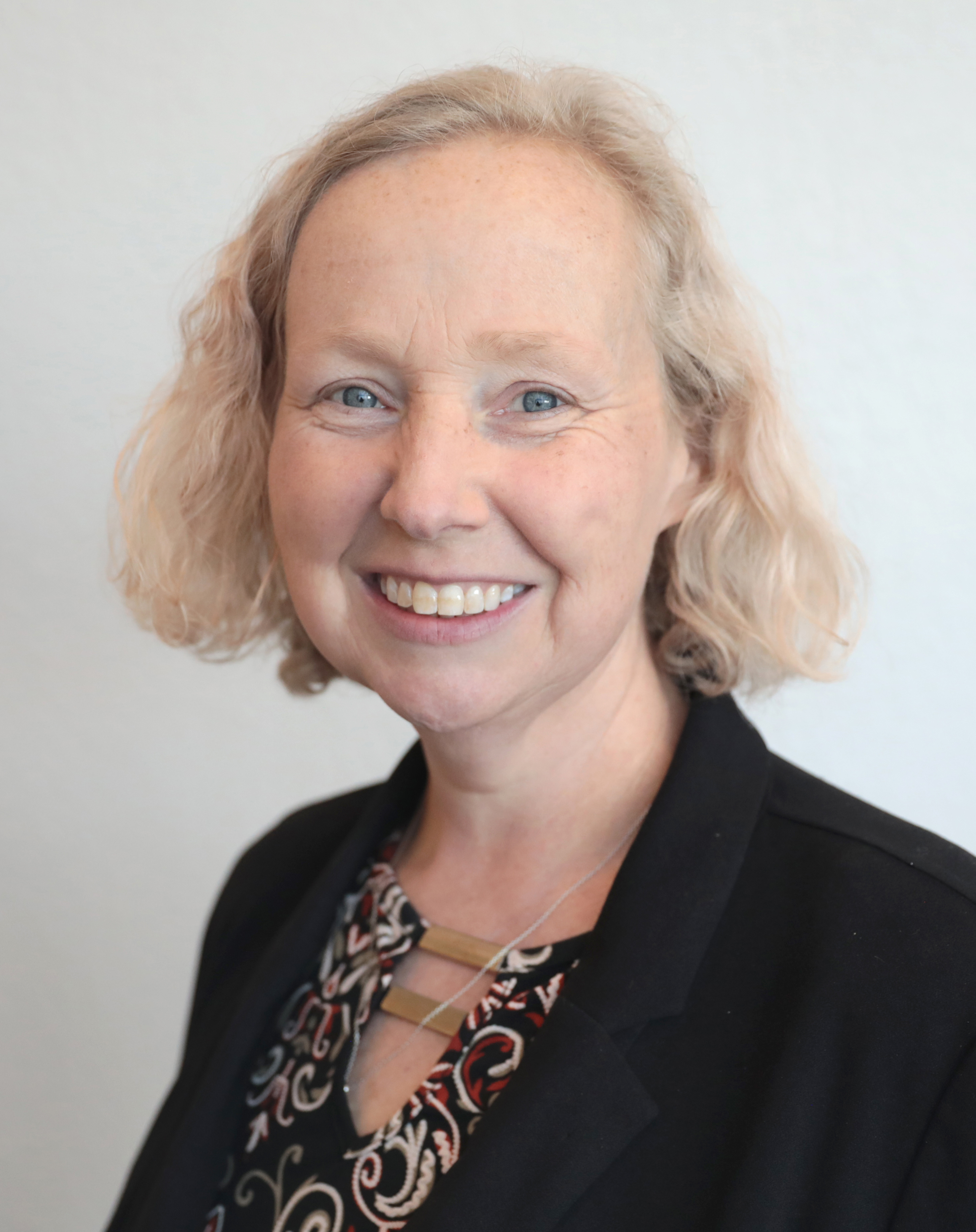

Member of the Indiana House of Representatives from the 25th district
- In office November 9, 2022 – November 4, 2026
- Preceded by: Donald Lehe
- Succeeded by: Tiffany Stoner

Personal details
- Born: 1975 or 1976 (age 49–50) Green Bay, Wisconsin, U.S.
- Party: Republican
- Education: Bowling Green State University

Becky Cash (born 1975/1976) is an American politician who formerly served as a member of the Indiana House of Representatives from the 25th district. She assumed office on November 9, 2022.

== Career ==
Cash earned a bachelor's degree from Bowling Green State University in 1998. Cash's career experience includes working as a business owner and a naturopathic practitioner where she has her own practice in Indianapolis.

Cash lost her reelection to Democrat Tiffany Stoner in the November 3, 2026, general election.

== Personal life ==
Cash was born in Green Bay, Wisconsin. She is married to her husband, Chris, and has six children.
