= Ryan Lauer =

American politician

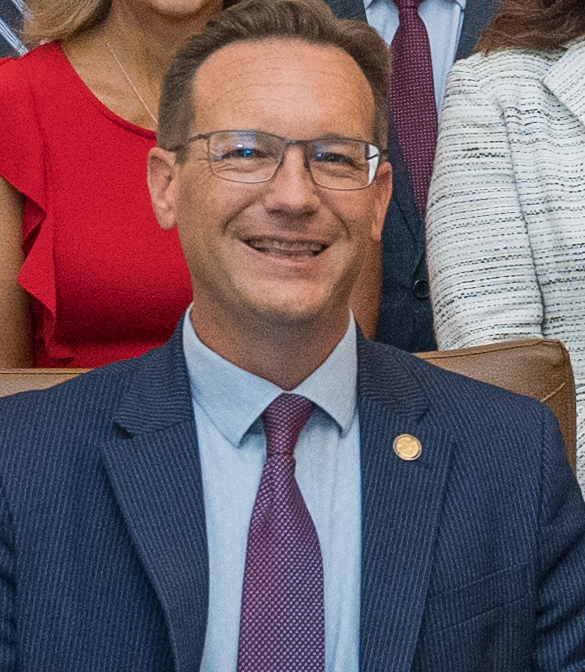

Member of the Indiana House of Representatives from the 59th district
- Incumbent
- Assumed office November 7, 2018
- Preceded by: Milo Smith

Personal details
- Party: Republican
- Spouse: Blair
- Children: 3
- Education: Indiana University, Bloomington (BS)

Ryan Lauer is an American politician serving as a member of the Indiana House of Representatives from the 59th district. He assumed office on November 7, 2018.

== Early life and education ==
Lauer is a native of Columbus, Indiana. He earned a Bachelor of Science degree in mathematics and biochemistry from Indiana University Bloomington.

== Career ==
Lauer began his career as a technical support employee for Kiva Networking and BlueMarble Telecom. He was a violinist in the Columbus Indiana Philharmonic and founded Lauer Technology in 2004. He has also worked as a technical specialist for Cummins. Lauer was elected to the Indiana House of Representatives in November 2018. He also serves as vice chair of the Veterans Affairs and Public Safety Committee.

In December 2021, Lauer co-authored House Bill 1001, which would "end the statewide public health emergency and to restrict business options to require COVID-19 vaccinations".
