= Mike Andrade =

American politician (born 1980)

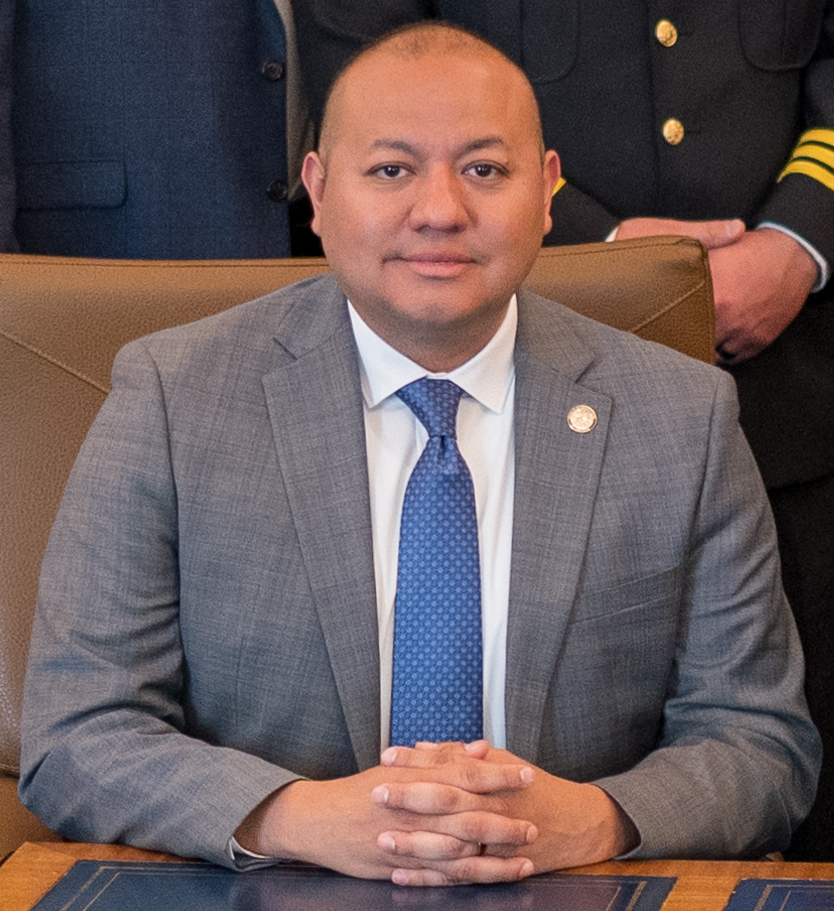
- Andrade in 2023

Member of the Indiana House of Representatives from the 12th district
- Incumbent
- Assumed office November 4, 2020
- Preceded by: Mara Candelaria Reardon

Personal details
- Born: March 10, 1980 (age 46)
- Party: Democratic
- Children: 1

Mike Andrade (born March 10, 1980) is an American politician serving as a member of the Indiana House of Representatives from the 12th district. He assumed office on November 4, 2020.

== Background ==
Andrade was born on March 10, 1980, and was raised in Pilsen Historic District, Chicago, moving to Hammond, Indiana as a young adult. Andrade owns and operates a real estate investment firm. In November 2020, Andrade was elected to the Indiana House of Representatives for the 12th district, succeeding Mara Candelaria Reardon.
