= Randy Lyness =

American politician (born 1951)

Member of the Indiana House of Representatives from the 68th district
- In office November 6, 2015 – November 18, 2024
- Preceded by: Jud McMillin
- Succeeded by: Garrett Bascom

Personal details
- Born: October 2, 1951 (age 74) Logan Township, Dearborn County, Indiana
- Party: Republican

Randy Lyness (born October 2, 1951) is an American politician who served in the Indiana House of Representatives from the 68th district since 2015 to 2024.
