= Cory Criswell =

American politician

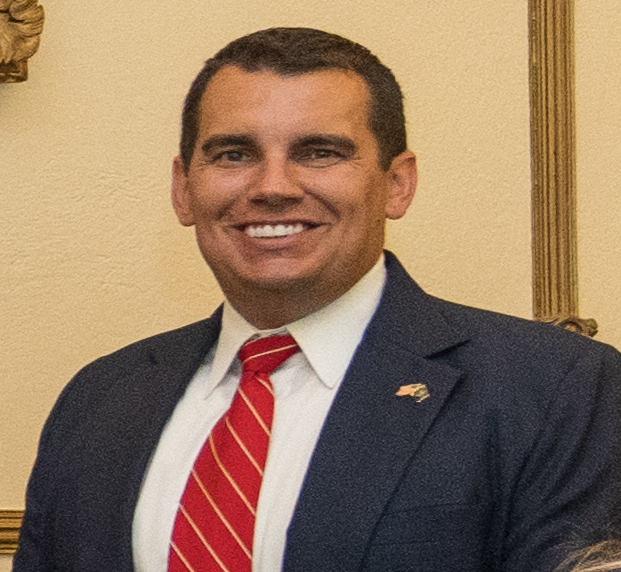

Member of the Indiana House of Representatives from the 54th district
- Incumbent
- Assumed office November 22, 2022
- Preceded by: Tom Saunders

Personal details
- Party: Republican
- Education: Anderson University (BS); Ball State University (M.Ed.)

Cory Criswell is an American politician serving as a member of the Indiana House of Representatives from the 54th district. He assumed office on November 22, 2022.

== Career ==
Criswell earned a bachelor's degree in physical education from Anderson University and a master's degree in educational leadership from Ball State University. In July 2023, the Indiana Basketball Hall of Fame hired Criswell as their development director while keeping his role as a state representative.

== Personal life ==
Criswell lives in Middletown with his wife, Sabrina. They have two children Caleb and Carlee. They are members of Blue River Church of the Nazarene. He is a member of Free and Accepted Masons and Sons of the American Legion.
