= Alex Zimmerman =

American politician

Member of the Indiana House of Representatives from the 67th district
- Incumbent
- Assumed office July 17, 2023
- Preceded by: Randy Frye

Personal details
- Born: North Vernon, Indiana, U.S.
- Party: Republican
- Spouse: Kayla Zimmerman
- Children: 1
- Education: Indiana University Robert H. McKinney School of Law
- Profession: Attorney

Alex Zimmerman is an American attorney and politician serving as a Republican member of the Indiana House of Representatives for the 67th district. He was appointed to the position on July 17, 2023, following the resignation of Representative Randy Frye due to health issues. Zimmerman was elected to the seat in the 2024 general election and is currently serving his first full term.

== Early life and education ==
Zimmerman was born and raised in Delaware County, Indiana. He earned his Juris Doctor from the Indiana University Robert H. McKinney School of Law in 2020. Prior to his legislative career, Zimmerman worked in various roles within the Indiana Senate, including legislative assistant, majority legal associate, and deputy majority attorney from 2015 to 2020.

== Legal career ==
Zimmerman owns and operates a private law practice in North Vernon, focusing on criminal defense, family law, estate planning, wills and trusts, probate law, guardianships, powers of attorney, and municipal law. His firm emphasizes client service and caters to the legal needs of Jennings County and Southeastern Indiana residents.

== Political career ==
Zimmerman was selected by a Republican caucus to fill the vacant seat in House District 67 on July 17, 2023. He won the seat in the 2024 general election with 100% of the vote.

As a state representative, Zimmerman has sponsored legislation aimed at improving various local issues, including child welfare and fire protection districts. He has advocated for reducing the time children spend in the foster care system and has also worked on expanding the use of fire protection districts across the state. Additionally, he has worked on bills that aim to strengthen penalties for driving without a license, particularly when such violations result in death.

Zimmerman's legislative focus includes public safety, criminal justice reform, and supporting local governance structures that improve the efficiency and quality of service delivery to citizens.

== Personal life ==
Zimmerman resides in North Vernon with his wife, Kayla, who is also an attorney, and their son. The family attends Vernon Baptist Church.

== Elections ==
=== 2023 ===
After Randy Frye resigned, a Republican precinct caucus met on July 17, 2023, to fill the District 67 vacancy. Zimmerman received 26 votes on the first ballot in a field of four candidates.

=== 2024 ===
Indiana House District 67 Republican primary, May 7, 2024
Party	Candidate	Votes	%
Republican	Alex Zimmerman (incumbent)	5,317	64.9
Republican	Chad Meinders	2,876	35.1
Total votes		8,193	100.0

Indiana House District 67 general election, November 5, 2024
Party	Candidate	Votes	%
Republican	Alex Zimmerman (incumbent)	25,408	100.0
Total votes		25,408	100.0

=== 2026 ===
Indiana House District 67 Republican primary, May 5, 2026
Party	Candidate	Votes	%
Republican	Alex Zimmerman (incumbent)	6,963	100.0
Total votes		6,963	100.0

Indiana House District 67 general election, November 3, 2026 (unofficial results)
Party	Candidate	Votes	%
Republican	Alex Zimmerman (incumbent)	12,838	68.1
Democratic	Justin Chadwick	6,026	31.9
Total votes		18,864	100.0
