= Matt Commons =

American politician

Member of the Indiana House of Representatives from the 13th district
- Incumbent
- Assumed office November 19, 2024
- Preceded by: Sharon Negele

Personal details
- Born: 1990 or 1991 (age 34–35)
- Party: Republican
- Education: Purdue University (BA); Liberty University (MA); Indiana State University (M.Ed.)
- Awards: Purple Heart

Military service
- Allegiance: United States of America
- Branch/service: United States Army
- Unit: 82nd Airborne Division
- Battles/wars: War in Afghanistan

Matt Commons (born 1990 or 1991) is an American politician serving as a member of the Indiana House of Representatives from the 13th district. He assumed office on November 19, 2024.

== Career ==
Commons was an infantryman in the 82nd Airborne Division and served in Afghanistan. He later became a teacher at Seeger Memorial High School. Commons challenged incumbent Sharon Negele in the 2024 Republican primary. He easily defeated Negele in what was considered a major upset.

== Personal life ==
Commons is married to Alyssa and lives in Williamsport with their two kids.
