= Lorissa Sweet =

American businesswoman and politician

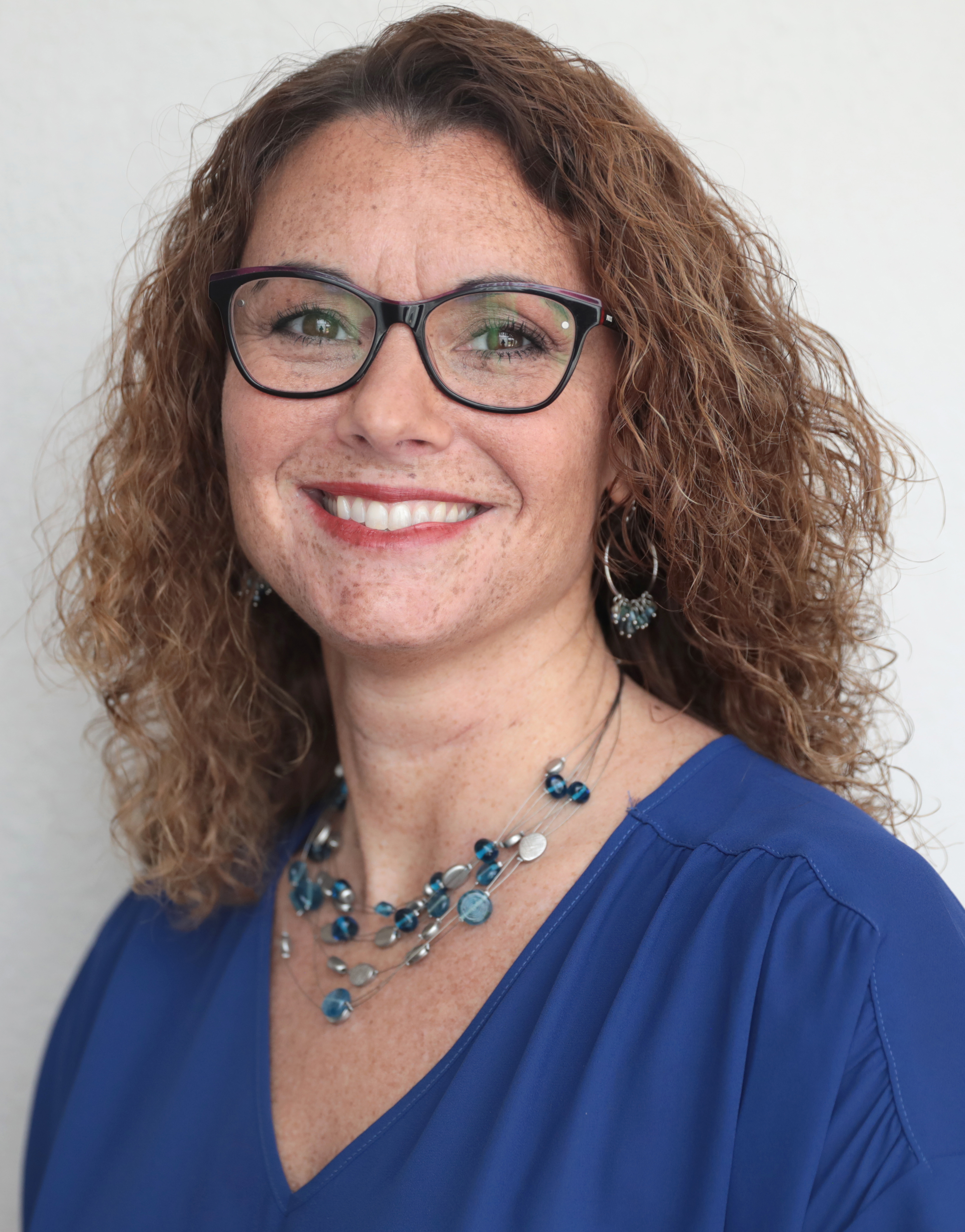

Member of the Indiana House of Representatives from the 50th district
- Incumbent
- Assumed office November 9, 2022
- Preceded by: Dan Leonard

Personal details
- Born: November 12, 1978 (age 47)
- Party: Republican
- Children: 2
- Education: Purdue University (BS)

Lorissa Sweet is an American politician and businesswoman serving as a member of the Indiana House of Representatives for the 50th district. She assumed office on November 9, 2022.

== Education ==
Sweet graduated from Maconaquah High School and earned a Bachelor of Science degree in animal agribusiness from Purdue University.

== Career ==
A businesswoman, Sweet is the owner of Sweet Grooms, a pet grooming business, and Sweet Occasions LLC, a wedding decor rental business. From 2016 to 2022, she served as a member of the Wabash County Council. Sweet was elected to the Indiana House of Representatives in November 2022.

In 2023, Sweet spearheaded legislation barring any public funding of the Kinsey Institute, a part of Indiana University, claiming that it promoted child sex abuse.
