= Randy Frye =

American politician from Indiana

Member of the Indiana House of Representatives from the 67th district
- In office November 16, 2010 – July 8, 2023
- Preceded by: Cleo Duncan
- Succeeded by: Alex Zimmerman

Personal details
- Born: July 7, 1955 (age 71) Oldenburg, Indiana
- Party: Republican
- Education: Cincinnati Christian College (AA)

Randy Frye (born July 7, 1955) is an American retired firefighter and politician who has served in the Indiana House of Representatives from the 67th district since 2010, having previously served in the Indianapolis Fire Department from 1994 to 2010.

On 29 June 2023, Frye announced he would resign from the House on July 8 due to health issues.
