= 2024 United States House of Representatives elections in Indiana =

- November 5, 2024

All 9 Indiana seats to the United States House of Representatives
| | Majority party | Minority party |
|---|---|---|
| Party | Republican | Democratic |
| Last election | 7 | 2 |
| Seats won | 7 | 2 |
| Seat change | Steady | Steady |
| Popular vote | 1,668,618 | 1,103,484 |
| Percentage | 58.18% | 38.47% |
| Swing | ▼1.52% | ▼0.11% |

Republican
50–60%
60–70%
70–80%
80–90%
Democratic
50–60%
60–70%

The 2024 United States House of Representatives elections in Indiana were held on November 5, 2024, to elect the nine U.S. representatives from the State of Indiana, one from all nine of the state's congressional districts. The elections coincided with the 2024 U.S. presidential election, other elections to the House of Representatives, elections to the United States Senate, and various state and local elections. The primary elections occurred on May 7, 2024.

== Statewide overview ==
| Party | Candidates | Votes | | Seats | | |
| Party | Candidates | No. | % | No. | +/– | % |
|---|---|---|---|---|---|---|
| Democratic Party | 9 | 1,103,484 | 38.47% | 2 | | 22.22% |
| Republican Party | 9 | 1,668,618 | 58.18% | 7 | | 77.78% |
| Libertarian Party | 9 | 86,202 | 3.01% | 0 | | 0% |
| Independent and write-in | 2 | 9,803 | 0.34% | 0 | | 0% |
| Total valid vote | | 2,868,107 | 100% | 9 | | 100% |
| Spoiled or blank ballots | | ? | | | | |
| Registered voters/turnout/voting-age population/registration rate | | ? | | | | |

Statewide popular vote
| Republican | 58.178% |
| Democratic | 38.474% |
| Libertarian | 3.0055% |
| Independent | 0.3418% |

House seats
| Republican | 77.78% |
| Democratic | 22.22% |

== District 1 ==
2024 Indiana's 1st congressional district election
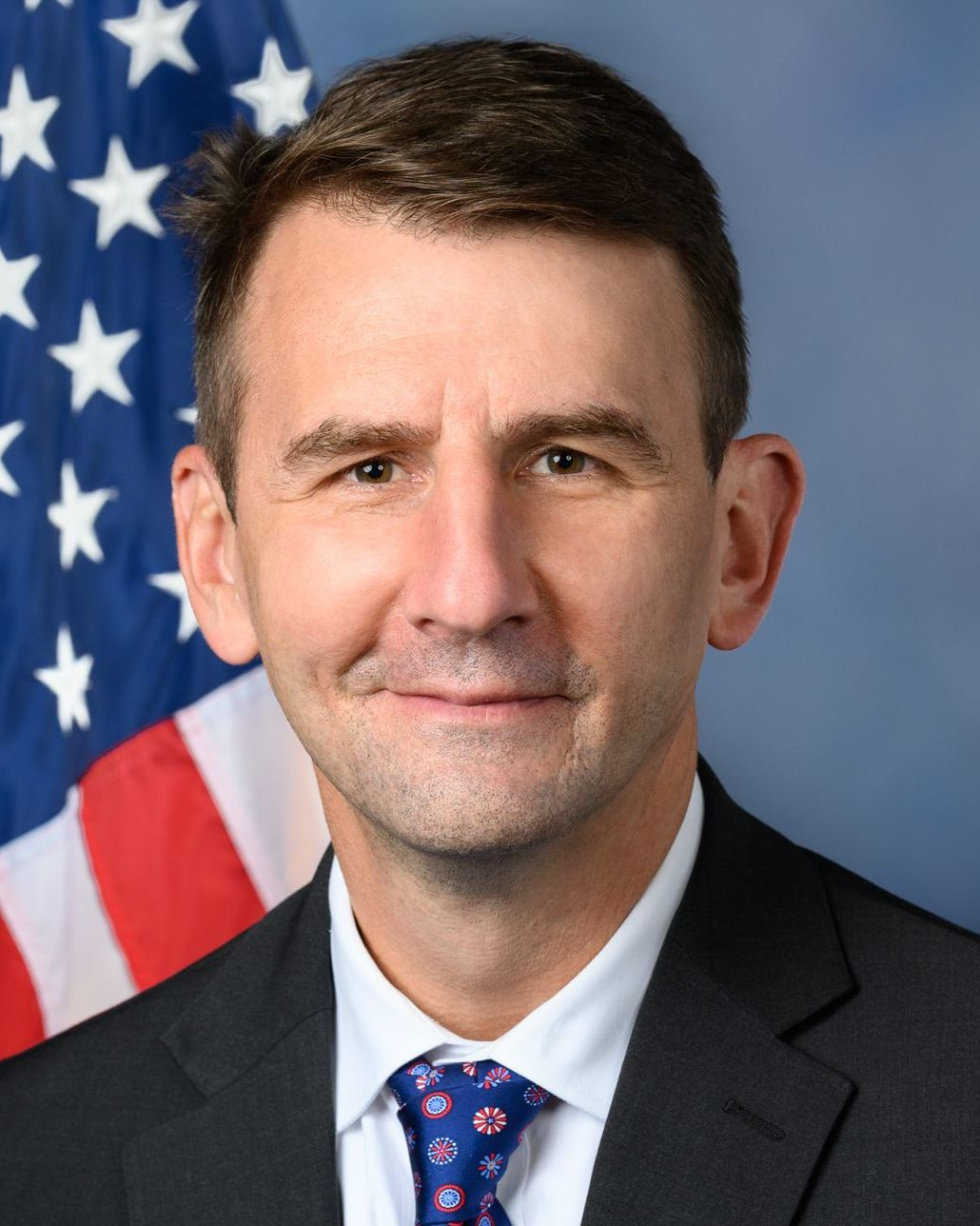

| Nominee | Frank J. Mrvan | Randy Niemeyer |
| Party | Democratic | Republican |
| Popular vote | 172,467 | 145,056 |
| Percentage | 53.4% | 44.9% |
- Mrvan: 40–50% 50–60% 60–70% 70–80% 80–90% >90% Niemeyer: 40–50% 50–60% 60–70% 70–80% 80–90% >90% Tie: 50%
U.S. Representative before election
Frank J. Mrvan
Democratic
Elected U.S. Representative
Frank J. Mrvan
Democratic

The 1st district encompasses Northwest Indiana, taking in the eastern Chicago metropolitan area, including Hammond and Gary, as well as Lake County, Porter County and northwest LaPorte County. The incumbent was Democrat Frank Mrvan, who was elected with 52.8% of the vote in 2022. Mrvan was re-elected in 2024 against Republican nominee Randy Niemeyer 53% to 45%.

=== Democratic primary ===
==== Nominee ====
- Frank Mrvan, incumbent U.S. representative

==== Endorsements ====
Frank Mrvan

Organizations

- AIPAC
- Brady PAC
- Everytown for Gun Safety Action Fund
- Giffords
- Humane Society Legislative Fund
- Joint Action Committee for Political Affairs
- League of Conservation Voters
- Planned Parenthood Action Fund
- Pro-Israel America

Labor unions

- National Education Association
- United Auto Workers

==== Fundraising ====
Campaign finance reports as of April 17, 2024
| Candidate | Raised | Spent | Cash on hand |
|---|---|---|---|
| Frank Mrvan (D) | $1,865,010 | $681,118 | $1,238,182 |
Source: Federal Election Commission

==== Results ====
Democratic primary results
| Party | Candidate | Votes | % |
|---|---|---|---|
| Democratic | Frank J. Mrvan (incumbent) | 31,155 | 100.0 |
| Total votes | | 31,155 | 100.0 |

=== Republican primary ===
==== Nominee ====
- Randy Niemeyer, Lake County councilor and chair of the Lake County Republican Party

==== Eliminated in the primary ====
- Mark Leyva, carpenter and nominee for this district in 2002, 2004, 2006, 2008, 2010, 2014, 2018, and 2020
- Ben Ruiz, activist and candidate for this district in 2022

==== Declined ====
- Jennifer-Ruth Green, educator and nominee for this district in 2022 (endorsed Niemeyer)

==== Endorsements ====
Randy Niemeyer

U.S. representatives

- Erin Houchin, U.S. representative from IN-09
- Mike Johnson, U.S. representative from Louisiana's 4th congressional district (2017–present) and speaker of the House (2023–present)

State legislators

- Dan Dernulc, state senator from the 1st district (2022–present)

Organizations

- Congressional Leadership Fund

==== Fundraising ====
Campaign finance reports as of April 17, 2024
| Candidate | Raised | Spent | Cash on hand |
|---|---|---|---|
| Randy Niemeyer (R) | $402,833 | $107,257 | $295,575 |
| Ben Ruiz (R) (Note: Did not file for pre-primary deadline) | $2,750 (Note: $2,000 of this total was self-funded by Ruiz) | $3,260 | $0 |
Source: Federal Election Commission

==== Results ====
Republican primary results
| Party | Candidate | Votes | % |
|---|---|---|---|
| Republican | Randy Niemeyer | 18,449 | 60.8 |
| Republican | Mark Leyva | 7,509 | 24.8 |
| Republican | Ben Ruiz | 4,367 | 14.4 |
| Total votes | | 30,325 | 100.0 |

=== Libertarian convention ===
==== Nominee ====
- Dakotah Miskus, customer service representative

=== General election ===
==== Predictions ====
| Source | Ranking | As of |
|---|---|---|
| The Cook Political Report | Likely D | October 4, 2024 |
| Inside Elections | Likely D | March 10, 2023 |
| Sabato's Crystal Ball | Lean D | February 23, 2023 |
| Elections Daily | Likely D | November 4, 2024 |
| CNalysis | Likely D | November 16, 2023 |

==== Post-primary endorsements ====
Frank Mrvan

Labor unions

- Indiana AFL–CIO
Randy Niemeyer

Organizations

- National Federation of Independent Business

==== Results ====
2024 Indiana's 1st congressional district election
| Party | Candidate | Votes | % |
|---|---|---|---|
| Republican | Julie Olthoff | 160,056 | 49.60% |
| Democratic | Frank J. Mrvan (incumbent) | 158,967 | 49.26 |
| Libertarian | Dakotah Miskus | 3,700 | 1.14 |
| Total votes | | 322,723 | 100.0 |
| Republican hold | | | |

== District 2 ==
2024 Indiana's 2nd congressional district election
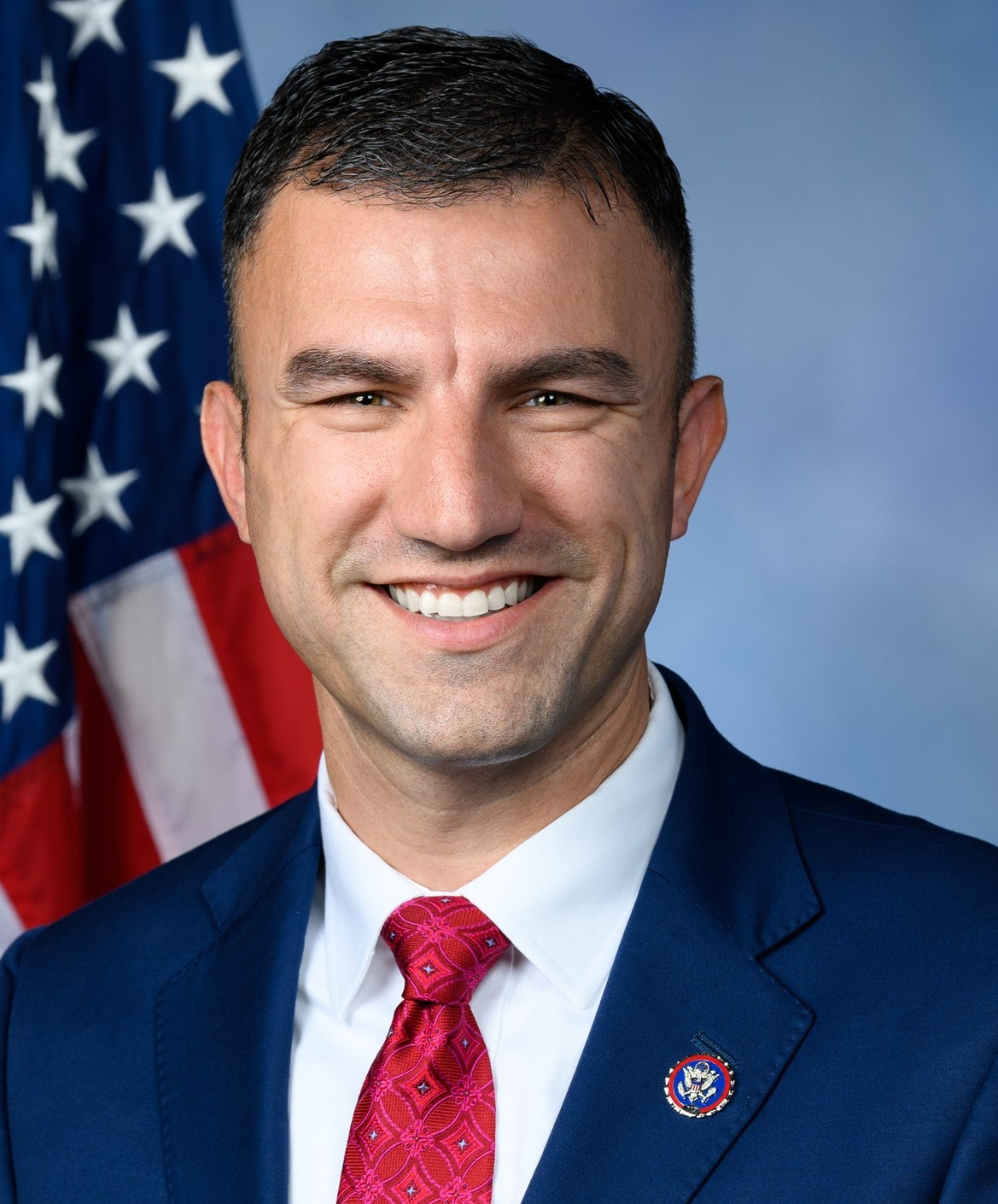

| Nominee | Rudy Yakym | Lori Camp |
| Party | Republican | Democratic |
| Popular vote | 184,848 | 101,962 |
| Percentage | 62.7% | 34.6% |
- County results Yakym: 50–60% 60–70% 70–80%
U.S. Representative before election
Rudy Yakym
Republican
Elected U.S. Representative
Rudy Yakym
Republican

The 2nd district is located in north central Indiana, taking in Michiana, including South Bend, Mishawaka, Elkhart, and Warsaw. The incumbent was Republican Rudy Yakym, who was elected with 64.6% of the vote in 2022.

=== Republican primary ===
==== Nominee ====
- Rudy Yakym, incumbent U.S. representative

==== Endorsements ====
Rudy Yakym

Organizations

- AIPAC
- NRA Political Victory Fund
- Pro-Israel America

==== Fundraising ====
Campaign finance reports as of April 17, 2024
| Candidate | Raised | Spent | Cash on hand |
|---|---|---|---|
| Rudy Yakym (R) | $1,665,423 | $1,251,580 | $561,955 |
Source: Federal Election Commission

==== Results ====
Republican primary results
| Party | Candidate | Votes | % |
|---|---|---|---|
| Republican | Rudy Yakym (incumbent) | 50,799 | 100.0 |
| Total votes | | 50,799 | 100.0 |

=== Democratic primary ===
==== Nominee ====
- Lori Camp, software firm operations manager

==== Fundraising ====
Campaign finance reports as of April 17, 2024
| Candidate | Raised | Spent | Cash on hand |
|---|---|---|---|
| Lori Camp (D) | $20,790 | $2,432 | $9,980 |
Source: Federal Election Commission

==== Results ====
Democratic primary results
| Party | Candidate | Votes | % |
|---|---|---|---|
| Democratic | Lori Camp | 13,827 | 100.0 |
| Total votes | | 13,827 | 100.0 |

=== Libertarian convention ===
==== Nominee ====
- William Henry, communications consultant, nominee for this district in 2022, and nominee for lieutenant governor in 2020

=== General election ===
==== Predictions ====
| Source | Ranking | As of |
|---|---|---|
| The Cook Political Report | Solid R | February 2, 2023 |
| Inside Elections | Solid R | March 10, 2023 |
| Sabato's Crystal Ball | Safe R | February 23, 2023 |
| Elections Daily | Safe R | June 8, 2023 |
| CNalysis | Solid R | November 16, 2023 |

==== Debates ====
2024 United States House of Representatives elections in Indiana 2nd congressional district debate
| No. | Date | Host | Moderator | Link | Participants | | |
| Key: P Participant A Absent N Non-invitee I Invitee W Withdrawn | | | | | | | |
| Key: P Participant A Absent N Non-invitee I Invitee W Withdrawn | | | | | Yakym | Camp | Henry |
|---|---|---|---|---|---|---|---|
| 1 | October 8, 2024 | WSBT-TV | George Mallet; John Paul; Brian Conybeare | Video | A | P | P |

==== Results ====
2024 Indiana's 2nd congressional district election
| Party | Candidate | Votes | % |
|---|---|---|---|
| Republican | Rudy Yakym (incumbent) | 184,848 | 62.7 |
| Democratic | Lori Camp | 101,962 | 34.6 |
| Libertarian | William Henry | 7,795 | 2.6 |
| Independent | Michael John Hubbard (write-in) | 13 | 0.0 |
| Total votes | | 294,618 | 100.0 |
| Republican hold | | | |

== District 3 ==
2024 Indiana's 3rd congressional district election
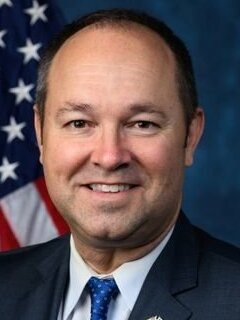

| Nominee | Marlin Stutzman | Kiley Adolph |
| Party | Republican | Democratic |
| Popular vote | 202,653 | 97,871 |
| Percentage | 65.0% | 31.4% |
- County results Stutzman: 50–60% 60–70% 70–80%
U.S. Representative before election
Jim Banks
Republican
Elected U.S. Representative
Marlin Stutzman
Republican

The 3rd District encompasses Northeast Indiana, which is anchored by the Fort Wayne metropolitan area, and also includes the cities of Huntington, Auburn, Angola, Bluffton, Decatur, and Kendallville. The incumbent Republican Jim Banks, who was re-elected with 65.3% of the vote in 2022, ran for the open U.S. Senate seat in 2024, previously held by Senator Mike Braun. Because of this, the 3rd district was an open seat in this election.

=== Republican primary ===
==== Nominee ====
- Marlin Stutzman, former U.S. representative for this district (2010–2017) and candidate for U.S. Senate in 2010 and 2016

==== Eliminated in the primary ====
- Grant Bucher, construction project manager
- Wendy Davis, former Allen County circuit court judge
- Mike Felker, maintenance technician
- Jon Kenworthy, former aide to U.S. Senators Mike Braun and Dan Coats
- Tim Smith, Vincennes fire chief and nominee for mayor of Fort Wayne in 2019
- Eric Whalen, blue-collar worker
- Andy Zay, state senator from the 17th district (2016–present)

==== Declined ====
- Jim Banks, incumbent U.S. representative (ran for U.S. Senate)

==== Endorsements ====
Wendy Davis

Organizations

- Indiana Right to Life (co-endorsement with Smith, Stutzman and Zay)
- Republican Main Street Partnership
- Susan B. Anthony Pro-Life America (co-endorsement with Stutzman)
Tim Smith

Organizations

- Indiana Right to Life (co-endorsement with Davis, Stutzman, and Zay)
Marlin Stutzman

U.S. representatives

- Jody Hice, former U.S. representative for Georgia's 10th congressional district (2015–2023)

Organizations

- Club for Growth
- Family Research Council Action PAC
- House Freedom Fund
- Indiana Right to Life (co-endorsement with Davis, Smith, and Zay)
- Susan B. Anthony Pro-Life America (co-endorsement with Davis)
Andy Zay

Organizations

- Indiana Right to Life (co-endorsement with Davis, Smith, and Stutzman)

==== Fundraising ====
Campaign finance reports as of April 17, 2024
| Candidate | Raised | Spent | Cash on hand |
|---|---|---|---|
| Grant Bucher (R) | $98,237 (Note: $8,885 of this total was self-funded by Bucher) | $69,899 | $28,445 |
| Wendy Davis (R) | $1,000,117 (Note: $253,200 of this total was self-funded by Davis) | $750,832 | $249,285 |
| Mike Felker (R) | $24,250 | $23,439 | $811 |
| Jon Kenworthy (R) | $66,980 | $57,943 | $9,037 |
| Tim Smith (R) | $1,322,967 (Note: $1,100,000 of this total was self-funded by Smith) | $999,110 | $323,856 |
| Marlin Stutzman (R) | $796,281 (Note: $500,000 of this total was self-funded by Stutzman) | $708,277 | $88,003 |
| Eric Whalen (R) | $5,202 | $3,038 | $2,075 |
| Andy Zay (R) | $692,927 (Note: $100,000 of this total was self-funded by Zay) | $545,645 | $147,281 |
Source: Federal Election Commission

==== Results ====
Primary results by county: Stutzman: 20–30%; 30–40%; Smith: 20–30%; Zay: 20–30%; 50–60%; Bucher: 20–30%; 40–50%

Republican primary results
| Party | Candidate | Votes | % |
|---|---|---|---|
| Republican | Marlin Stutzman | 19,507 | 24.2 |
| Republican | Tim Smith | 18,204 | 22.6 |
| Republican | Wendy Davis | 15,660 | 19.5 |
| Republican | Andy Zay | 13,157 | 16.4 |
| Republican | Grant Bucher | 8,259 | 10.3 |
| Republican | Jon Kenworthy | 3,064 | 3.8 |
| Republican | Mike Felker | 1,417 | 1.8 |
| Republican | Eric Whalen | 1,189 | 1.5 |
| Total votes | | 80,457 | 100.0 |

=== Democratic primary ===
==== Nominee ====
- Kiley Adolph, educator

==== Eliminated in the primary ====
- Phil Goss, brewery executive

==== Disqualified ====
- Thomas Schrader, blue collar worker, perennial candidate, and nominee for this district in 2016

==== Endorsements ====
Phil Goss

Organizations

- Vote Common Good

==== Fundraising ====
Campaign finance reports as of April 17, 2024
| Candidate | Raised | Spent | Cash on hand |
|---|---|---|---|
| Kiley Adolph (D) | $34,470 | $19,232 | $15,237 |
| Phil Goss (D) | $215,251 (Note: $207,000 of this total was self-funded by Goss) | $193,754 | $21,497 |
Source: Federal Election Commission

==== Results ====
Democratic primary results
| Party | Candidate | Votes | % |
|---|---|---|---|
| Democratic | Kiley Adolph | 10,286 | 62.8 |
| Democratic | Phil Goss | 6,095 | 37.2 |
| Total votes | | 16,381 | 100.0 |

=== Libertarian convention ===
==== Nominee ====
- Jarrad Lancaster, machinist

=== General election ===
==== Predictions ====
| Source | Ranking | As of |
|---|---|---|
| The Cook Political Report | Solid R | February 2, 2023 |
| Inside Elections | Solid R | March 10, 2023 |
| Sabato's Crystal Ball | Safe R | February 23, 2023 |
| Elections Daily | Safe R | June 8, 2023 |
| CNalysis | Solid R | November 16, 2023 |

==== Results ====
2024 Indiana's 3rd congressional district election
| Party | Candidate | Votes | % |
|---|---|---|---|
| Republican | Marlin Stutzman | 202,653 | 65.0 |
| Democratic | Kiley Adolph | 97,871 | 31.4 |
| Libertarian | Jarrad Lancaster | 11,015 | 3.5 |
| Total votes | | 311,539 | 100.0 |
| Republican hold | | | |

== District 4 ==
2024 Indiana's 4th congressional district election
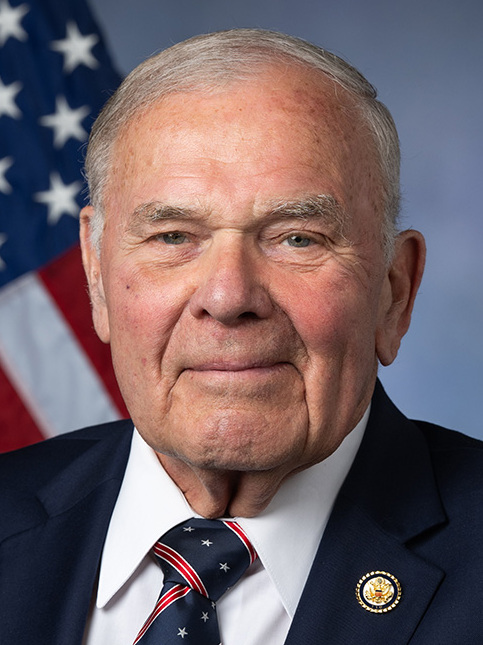

| Nominee | Jim Baird | Derrick Holder |
| Party | Republican | Democratic |
| Popular vote | 209,794 | 100,091 |
| Percentage | 64.8% | 30.9% |
- County results Baird: 50–60% 60–70% 70–80%
U.S. Representative before election
Jim Baird
Republican
Elected U.S. Representative
Jim Baird
Republican

The 4th district is located in west-central Indiana, taking in Lafayette and the western suburbs of Indianapolis. The incumbent was Republican Jim Baird, who was re-elected with 68.2% of the vote in 2022.

=== Republican primary ===
==== Nominee ====
- Jim Baird, incumbent U.S. representative

==== Eliminated in the primary ====
- Charles Bookwalter, restaurant franchise owner and candidate for this district in 2022
- John Piper, businessman and perennial candidate

==== Endorsements ====
Jim Baird

Organizations

- AIPAC
- NRA Political Victory Fund

==== Fundraising ====
Campaign finance reports as of April 17, 2024
| Candidate | Raised | Spent | Cash on hand |
|---|---|---|---|
| Charles Bookwalter (R) | $171,174 (Note: $60,000 of this total was self-funded by Bookwalter) | $97,264 | $75,415 |
| James Baird (R) | $404,981 (Note: $200,000 of this total was self-funded by Baird) | $212,510 | $533,213 |
Source: Federal Election Commission

==== Results ====
Republican primary results
| Party | Candidate | Votes | % |
|---|---|---|---|
| Republican | Jim Baird (incumbent) | 48,723 | 64.72 |
| Republican | Charles Bookwalter | 20,505 | 27.24 |
| Republican | John Piper | 6,052 | 8.04 |
| Total votes | | 75,280 | 100.0 |

=== Democratic primary ===
==== Nominee ====
- Derrick Holder, paralegal

==== Eliminated in the primary ====
- Rimpi Girn, health insurance broker

==== Fundraising ====
Campaign finance reports as of April 17, 2024
| Candidate | Raised | Spent | Cash on hand |
|---|---|---|---|
| Rimpi Girn (D) | $42,164 | $41,608 | $1,444 |
Source: Federal Election Commission

==== Results ====
Democratic primary results
| Party | Candidate | Votes | % |
|---|---|---|---|
| Democratic | Derrick Holder | 7,709 | 63.5 |
| Democratic | Rimpi Girn | 4,436 | 36.5 |
| Total votes | | 12,145 | 100.0 |

=== Libertarian convention ===
==== Nominee ====
- Ashley Groff, account coordinator

=== General election ===
==== Predictions ====
| Source | Ranking | As of |
|---|---|---|
| The Cook Political Report | Solid R | February 2, 2023 |
| Inside Elections | Solid R | March 10, 2023 |
| Sabato's Crystal Ball | Safe R | February 23, 2023 |
| Elections Daily | Safe R | June 8, 2023 |
| CNalysis | Solid R | November 16, 2023 |

==== Results ====
2024 Indiana's 4th congressional district election
| Party | Candidate | Votes | % |
|---|---|---|---|
| Republican | Jim Baird (incumbent) | 209,794 | 64.8 |
| Democratic | Derrick Holder | 100,091 | 30.9 |
| Libertarian | Ashley Groff | 13,710 | 4.2 |
| Total votes | | 323,595 | 100.0 |
| Republican hold | | | |

== District 5 ==
2024 Indiana's 5th congressional district election
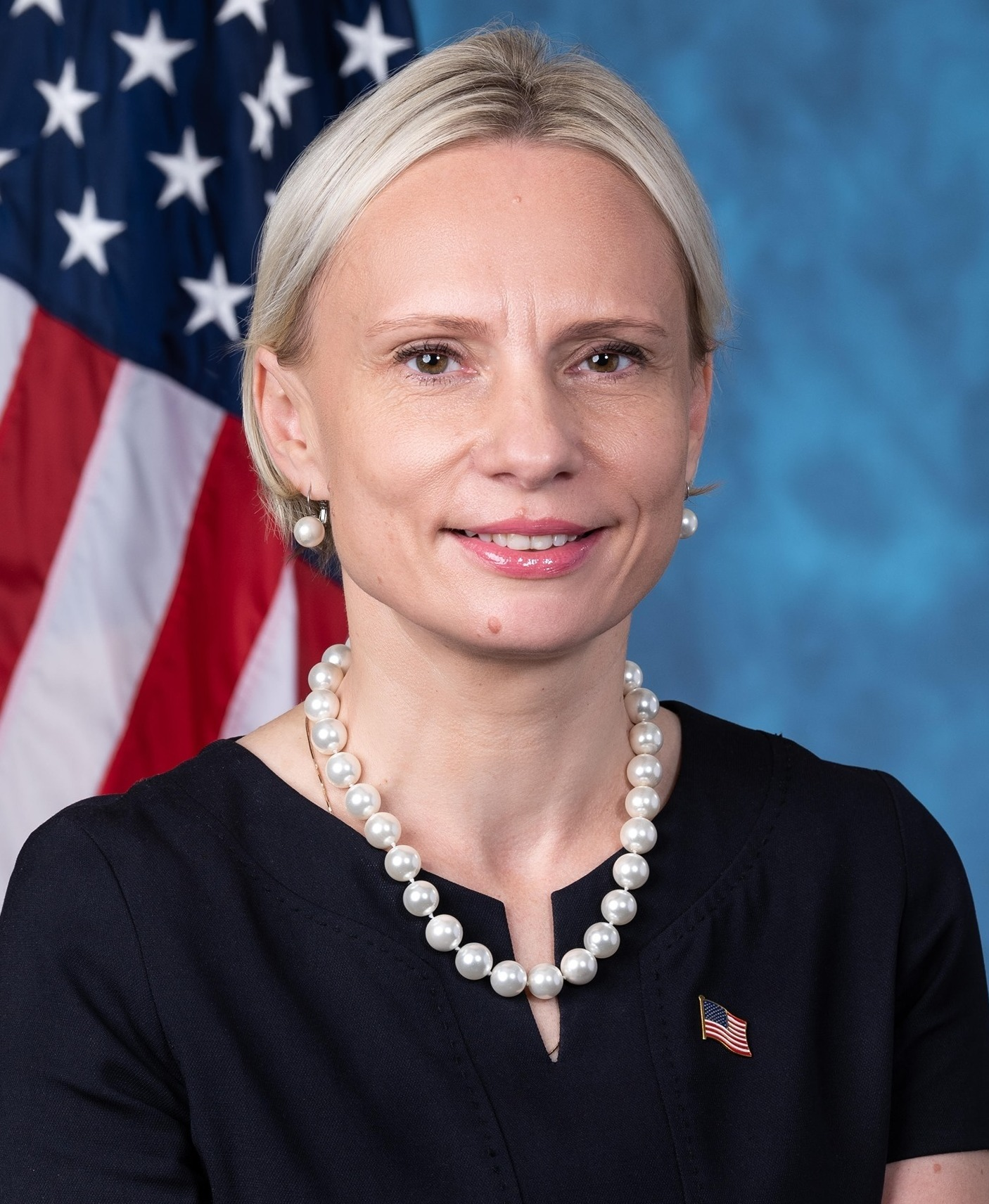

| Nominee | Victoria Spartz | Deborah Pickett |
| Party | Republican | Democratic |
| Popular vote | 203,293 | 136,554 |
| Percentage | 56.6% | 38.0% |
- County results Spartz: 50–60% 60–70% 70–80%
U.S. Representative before election
Victoria Spartz
Republican
Elected U.S. Representative
Victoria Spartz
Republican

The 5th district encompasses suburbs north of Indianapolis including Carmel, Fishers, and Noblesville, as well as the cities of Muncie, Marion, and parts of Kokomo. The incumbent was Republican Victoria Spartz, who was re-elected with 61.1% of the vote in 2022. Spartz announced in February 2023 that she would retire from Congress. However, in December, she expressed interest in running for re-election and said she had not made up her mind yet. In February 2024, Spartz filed to run for re-election, citing "the current failed leadership in Washington, D.C."

=== Republican primary ===
==== Nominee ====
- Victoria Spartz, incumbent U.S. representative

==== Eliminated in the primary ====
- Raju Chinthala, treasurer of the Hamilton County Republican Party
- Max Engling, former aide to then-U.S. House Speaker Kevin McCarthy
- Chuck Goodrich, state representative from the 29th district (2018–2024)
- Mark Hurt, attorney, former aide to U.S. Senator Dan Coats, and candidate for U.S. Senate in 2018
- Patrick Malayter, accountant
- Matthew Peiffer, nonprofit founder
- L.D. Powell, sales executive
- Larry Savage, property manager

==== Withdrawn ====
- Rodney Cummings, Madison County prosecutor
- Sid Mahant, trucking company owner (ran in the 6th district, later got disqualified from the 6th)

==== Declined ====
- Micah Beckwith, Noblesville public library trustee and candidate for this district in 2020 (ran for lieutenant governor)

==== Endorsements ====
Raju Chinthala

State officials

- Jim Schellinger, former Indiana Secretary of Commerce (Democratic)

Local officials

- Greg Ballard, former mayor of Indianapolis (2008–2016)
- James Brainard, former mayor of Carmel (1996–2024)
Max Engling

Organizations

- Republican Main Street Partnership
Chuck Goodrich

Organizations

- Americans for Prosperity
- GOPAC
Mark Hurt

Federal officials

- Fred Grandy, former U.S. representative
Victoria Spartz

Organizations

- AIPAC
- Indiana Right to Life
- NRA Political Victory Fund
- Susan B. Anthony List

==== Fundraising ====
Campaign finance reports as of April 17, 2024
| Candidate | Raised | Spent | Cash on hand |
|---|---|---|---|
| Raju Chinthala (R) | $292,074 | $162,492 | $129,581 |
| Max Engling (R) | $204,103 | $175,007 | $29,095 |
| Chuck Goodrich (R) | $5,469,567 (Note: $4,600,000 of this total was self-funded by Goodrich) | $4,121,531 | $1,348,036 |
| Mark Hurt (R) | $161,884 (Note: $9,800 of this total was self-funded by Hurt) | $148,057 | $13,827 |
| Patrick Malayter (R) | $7,500 | $0 | $7,500 |
| L. D. Powell (R) | $45,375 (Note: $41,000 of this total was self-funded by Powell) | $42,201 | $3,173 |
| Victoria Spartz (R) | $580,996 | $2,023,492 | $133,882 |
Source: Federal Election Commission

=== Polling ===
| Poll source | Date(s) administered | Sample size (Note: Key: A – all adults RV – registered voters LV – likely voters V – unclear) | Margin of error | Raju Chinthala | Mark Hurt | Chuck Goodrich | Victoria Spartz | Other | Undecided |
|---|---|---|---|---|---|---|---|---|---|
| Mark It Red (Note: Poll sponsored by Goodrich's campaign) | March 25–27, 2024 | 900 (LV) | ± 3.3% | 2% | 2% | 30% | 33% | 5% (Note: Max Engling with 3%; all other candidates with less than 2%) | 26% |
| Mark It Red | February 7–9, 2024 | 900 (LV) | – | – | – | 17% | 45% | – | 38% |
| co/efficient (R) (Note: Poll sponsored by Spartz's campaign) | January 30 – February 1, 2024 | 633 (LV) | ± 3.88% | 0% | 1% | 8% | 44% | 1% (Note: Scott Goad with 1%; Max Engling, Patrick Malayter, Matthew Peiffer, and L.D. Powell with 0%) | 45% |

==== Results ====
Primary results by county: Spartz: 30–40%; 40–50%; Goodrich: 30–40%

Republican primary results
| Party | Candidate | Votes | % |
|---|---|---|---|
| Republican | Victoria Spartz (incumbent) | 31,674 | 39.1 |
| Republican | Chuck Goodrich | 26,865 | 33.2 |
| Republican | Max Engling | 7,841 | 9.7 |
| Republican | Raju Chinthala | 5,742 | 7.1 |
| Republican | Mark Hurt | 4,431 | 5.5 |
| Republican | Larry Savage Jr. | 1,569 | 1.9 |
| Republican | Matthew Peiffer | 1,379 | 1.7 |
| Republican | Patrick Malayter | 800 | 1.0 |
| Republican | L.D. Powell | 729 | 0.9 |
| Total votes | | 81,030 | 100.0 |

=== Democratic primary ===
==== Nominee ====
- Deborah Pickett, teacher

==== Eliminated in the primary ====
- Ryan Pfenninger, tech executive

==== Fundraising ====
Campaign finance reports as of April 17, 2024
| Candidate | Raised | Spent | Cash on hand |
|---|---|---|---|
| Ryan Pfenninger (D) | $68,753 (Note: $52,500 of this total was self-funded by Pfenninger) | $24,819 | $43,933 |
| Deborah Pickett (D) | $10,513 | $6,116 | $4,396 |
Source: Federal Election Commission

==== Results ====
Democratic primary results
| Party | Candidate | Votes | % |
|---|---|---|---|
| Democratic | Deborah Pickett | 11,858 | 59.5 |
| Democratic | Ryan Pfenninger | 8,082 | 40.5 |
| Total votes | | 19,940 | 100.0 |

=== Libertarian convention ===
==== Nominee ====
- Lauri Shillings, university creative director

=== Independents ===
==== Declared ====
- Robby Slaughter, IT professional

=== General election ===
==== Predictions ====
| Source | Ranking | As of |
|---|---|---|
| The Cook Political Report | Solid R | February 2, 2023 |
| Inside Elections | Solid R | March 10, 2023 |
| Sabato's Crystal Ball | Safe R | February 23, 2023 |
| Elections Daily | Safe R | June 8, 2023 |
| CNalysis | Solid R | November 16, 2023 |

==== Results ====
2024 Indiana's 5th congressional district election
| Party | Candidate | Votes | % |
|---|---|---|---|
| Republican | Victoria Spartz (incumbent) | 203,293 | 56.6 |
| Democratic | Deborah Pickett | 136,554 | 38.0 |
| Independent | Robby Slaughter | 9,790 | 2.7 |
| Libertarian | Lauri Shillings | 9,567 | 2.7 |
| Total votes | | 359,204 | 100.0 |
| Republican hold | | | |

== District 6 ==
2024 Indiana's 6th congressional district election
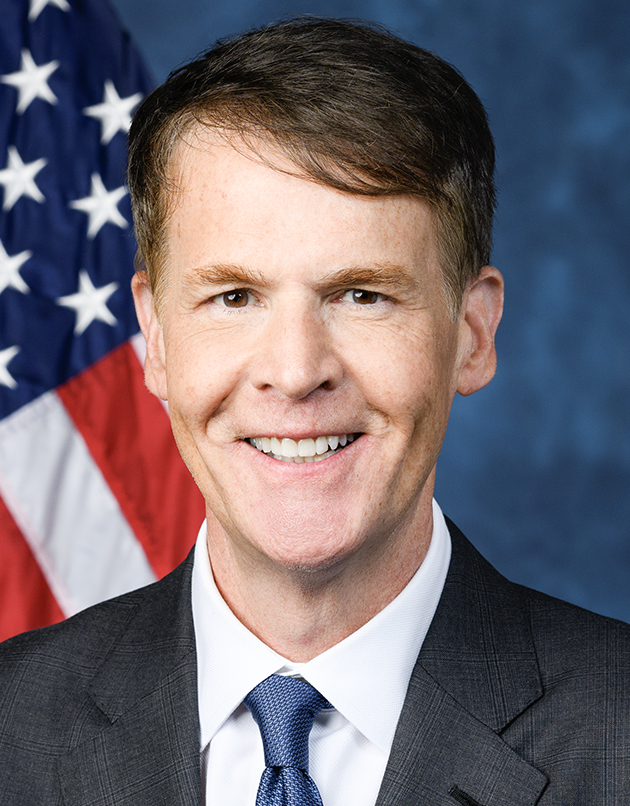

| Nominee | Jefferson Shreve | Cynthia Wirth |
| Party | Republican | Democratic |
| Popular vote | 201,357 | 99,841 |
| Percentage | 63.9% | 31.7% |
- County results Shreve: 50–60% 60–70% 70–80% 80–90%
U.S. Representative before election
Greg Pence
Republican
Elected U.S. Representative
Jefferson Shreve
Republican

The 6th district is located in eastern and central Indiana including Columbus and Richmond, some of Cincinnati's Indiana suburbs, most of Indianapolis' southern suburbs, and a sliver of Indianapolis itself. The incumbent was Republican Greg Pence, who was re-elected with 67.5% of the vote in 2022. On January 9, 2024, Pence announced that he would not be running for re-election.

=== Republican primary ===
==== Nominee ====
- Jefferson Shreve, former Indianapolis city councilor and nominee for mayor of Indianapolis in 2023

==== Eliminated in the primary ====
- Jamison Carrier, RV dealership consultant
- Darin Childress
- Bill Frazier, former state senator from the 14th district (1968–1970), perennial candidate, and nominee for this district (Note: This district was numbered as the 10th district prior to the 1980 redistricting cycle and as the 2nd district from then until the 2000 redistricting cycle) in 1976, 1978, 1980, and 1992
- John Jacob, former state representative from the 93rd district (2020–2022)
- Jeff Raatz, state senator from the 27th district (2014–present)
- Mike Speedy, state representative from the 90th district (2010–present)

==== Disqualified ====
- Sid Mahant, trucking company owner (previously ran in the 5th district)

==== Withdrawn ====
- Greg Pence, incumbent U.S. representative

==== Endorsements ====
Jamison Carrier

Individuals

- Vivek Ramaswamy, pharmaceutical executive and 2024 Republican presidential candidate
Jeff Raatz

Organizations

- Indiana Right to Life (co-endorsement with Speedy)
Jefferson Shreve

Organizations

- Indiana Chamber of Commerce
- United States Chamber of Commerce
Mike Speedy

Organizations

- Americans for Prosperity
- Indiana Right to Life (co-endorsement with Raatz)
- National Association of Homebuilders
- Susan B. Anthony Pro-Life America
Greg Pence (withdrawn)

Organizations

- AIPAC

==== Fundraising ====
Campaign finance reports as of April 17, 2024
| Candidate | Raised | Spent | Cash on hand |
|---|---|---|---|
| Jamison Carrier (R) | $865,269 (Note: $750,000 of this total was self-funded by Carrier) | $440,872 | $424,397 |
| John Jacob (R) | $32,898 | $9,148 | $23,749 |
| Jeff Raatz (R) | $108,204 (Note: $5,000 of this total was self-funded by Raatz) | $69,430 | $38,773 |
| Jefferson Shreve (R) | $4,542,500 (Note: $4,500,000 of this total was self-funded by Shreve) | $3,945,697 | $596,802 |
| Mike Speedy (R) | $1,367,940 (Note: $1,300,000 of this total was self-funded by Speedy) | $1,214,645 | $153,295 |
Source: Federal Election Commission

==== Results ====
Primary results by county: Shreve: 20–30%; 30–40%; Carrier: 20–30%; Raatz: 20–30%; 30–40%; 40–50%

Republican primary results
| Party | Candidate | Votes | % |
|---|---|---|---|
| Republican | Jefferson Shreve | 20,265 | 28.4 |
| Republican | Mike Speedy | 15,752 | 22.1 |
| Republican | Jamison Carrier | 14,386 | 20.1 |
| Republican | Bill Frazier | 7,110 | 10.0 |
| Republican | Jeff Raatz | 6,365 | 8.9 |
| Republican | John Jacob | 5,793 | 8.1 |
| Republican | Darin Childress | 1,737 | 2.4 |
| Total votes | | 71,408 | 100.0 |

=== Democratic primary ===
==== Nominee ====
- Cynthia Wirth, teacher and nominee for this district in 2022

==== Results ====
Democratic primary results
| Party | Candidate | Votes | % |
|---|---|---|---|
| Democratic | Cynthia Wirth | 11,708 | 100.0 |
| Total votes | | 11,708 | 100.0 |

=== Libertarian convention ===
==== Nominee ====
- James Sceniak, autism behavioral technician and nominee for U.S. Senate in 2022

=== General election ===
==== Predictions ====
| Source | Ranking | As of |
|---|---|---|
| The Cook Political Report | Solid R | February 2, 2023 |
| Inside Elections | Solid R | March 10, 2023 |
| Sabato's Crystal Ball | Safe R | February 23, 2023 |
| Elections Daily | Safe R | June 8, 2023 |
| CNalysis | Solid R | November 16, 2023 |

==== Post-primary endorsements ====
Jefferson Shreve

Organizations

- American Israel Public Affairs Committee (AIPAC)
- National Federation of Independent Business

==== Results ====
2024 Indiana's 6th congressional district election
| Party | Candidate | Votes | % |
|---|---|---|---|
| Republican | Jefferson Shreve | 201,357 | 63.9 |
| Democratic | Cynthia Wirth | 99,841 | 31.7 |
| Libertarian | James Sceniak | 13,711 | 4.4 |
| Total votes | | 314,909 | 100.0 |
| Republican hold | | | |

== District 7 ==
2024 Indiana's 7th congressional district election
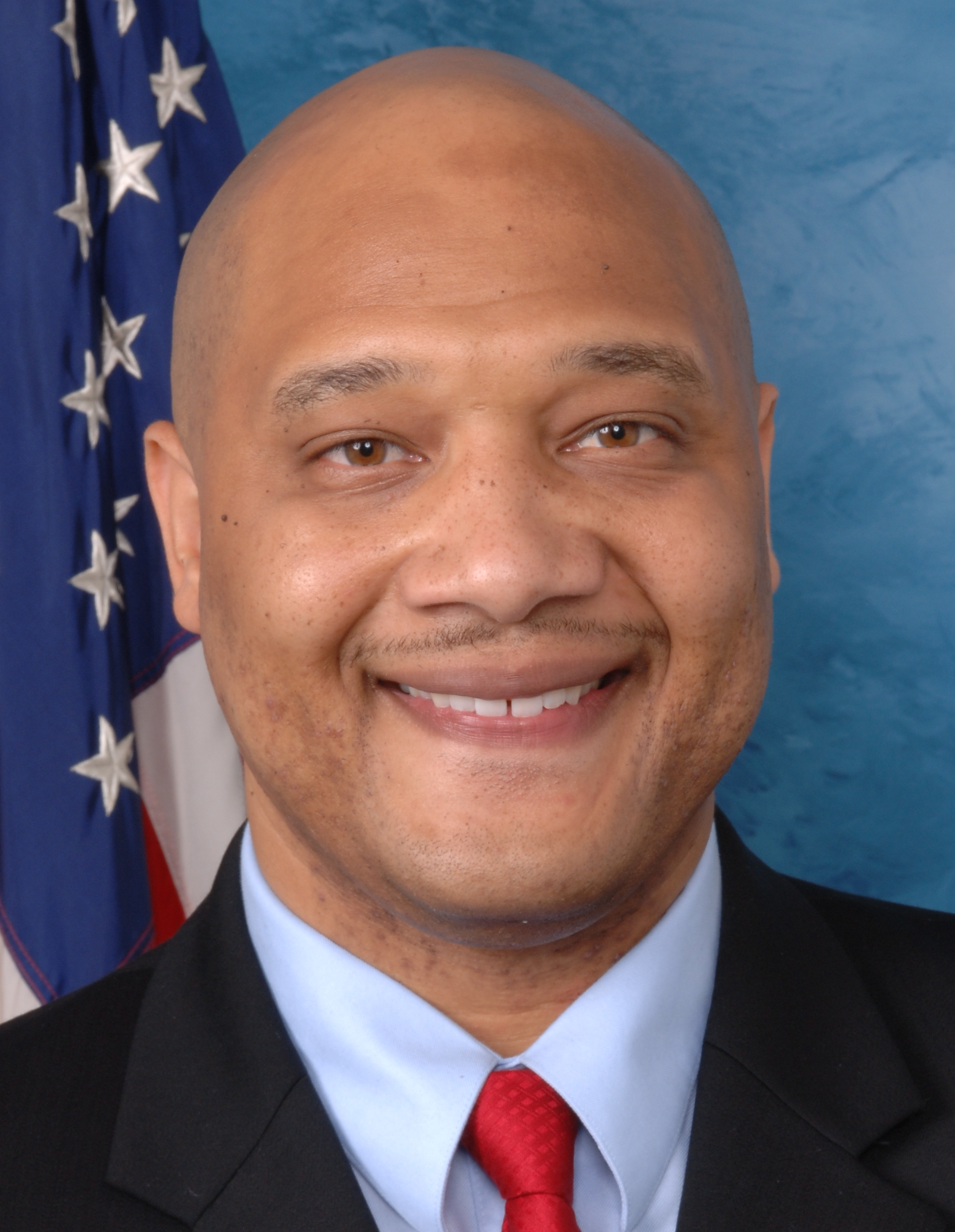

| Nominee | André Carson | John Schmitz |
| Party | Democratic | Republican |
| Popular vote | 185,987 | 78,792 |
| Percentage | 68.3% | 29.0% |
- County results Carson: 60–70%
U.S. Representative before election
André Carson
Democratic
Elected U.S. Representative
André Carson
Democratic

The 7th district is entirely located within Marion County and includes most of Indianapolis, except for the southern side. The incumbent was Democrat André Carson, who was re-elected with 67.0% of the vote in 2022.

=== Democratic primary ===
==== Nominee ====
- André Carson, incumbent U.S. representative

==== Eliminated in the primary ====
- Curtis Godfrey, salesman and perennial candidate
- Pierre Pullins, blue collar worker and perennial candidate

==== Endorsements ====
André Carson

Organizations

- Humane Society Legislative Fund
- J Street PAC
- League of Conservation Voters
- Sierra Club

Labor unions

- Indiana AFL–CIO (Post-primary)
- National Education Association
- United Auto Workers

==== Fundraising ====
Campaign finance reports as of April 17, 2024
| Candidate | Raised | Spent | Cash on hand |
|---|---|---|---|
| André Carson (D) | $444,221 | $654,506 | $500,816 |
Source: Federal Election Commission

==== Results ====
Democratic primary results
| Party | Candidate | Votes | % |
|---|---|---|---|
| Democratic | André Carson (incumbent) | 30,868 | 91.1 |
| Democratic | Curtis Godfrey | 1,845 | 5.4 |
| Democratic | Pierre Pullins | 1,178 | 3.5 |
| Total votes | | 33,891 | 100.0 |

=== Republican primary ===
The Republican primary was won by Jennifer Pace, who had been dead for over a month at the time of the primary.

A caucus of Republican precinct committee members in the 7th district on June 22, 2024, chose John Schmitz to fill the candidate vacancy.

==== Nominated after death ====
- Jennifer Pace, marketing agency art director and candidate for this district in 2022 (died March 2024, remained on ballot)

==== Replacement nominee ====
- John Schmitz, real estate developer and candidate for mayor of Indianapolis in 2019

==== Eliminated in the primary ====
- Philip Davis, retired postal worker
- Catherine Ping, businesswoman and nominee for this district in 2014 and 2016
- Gabe Whitley, pipe welder and candidate for mayor of Evansville in 2023

==== Fundraising ====
Campaign finance reports as of March 31, 2024
| Candidate | Raised | Spent | Cash on hand |
|---|---|---|---|
| Gabe Whitley (R) | $41,630 (Note: Whitley was convicted of campaign finance fraud in relation to his FEC filings.) | $34,722 | $6,908 |
Source: Federal Election Commission

==== Results ====
Republican primary results
| Party | Candidate | Votes | % |
|---|---|---|---|
| Republican | Jennifer Pace † | 7,716 | 31.2 |
| Republican | Catherine Ping | 7,390 | 29.9 |
| Republican | Philip Davis | 6,364 | 25.7 |
| Republican | Gabe Whitley | 3,249 | 13.1 |
| Total votes | | 24,719 | 100.0 |

=== Libertarian convention ===
==== Nominee ====
- Rusty Johnson, IT professional and Republican candidate for this district in 2022

=== General election ===
==== Predictions ====
| Source | Ranking | As of |
|---|---|---|
| The Cook Political Report | Solid D | February 2, 2023 |
| Inside Elections | Solid D | March 10, 2023 |
| Sabato's Crystal Ball | Safe D | February 23, 2023 |
| Elections Daily | Safe D | June 8, 2023 |
| CNalysis | Solid D | November 16, 2023 |

==== Results ====
2024 Indiana's 7th congressional district election
| Party | Candidate | Votes | % |
|---|---|---|---|
| Democratic | André Carson (incumbent) | 185,987 | 68.3 |
| Republican | John Schmitz | 78,792 | 29.0 |
| Libertarian | Rusty Johnson | 7,369 | 2.7 |
| Total votes | | 272,148 | 100.0 |
| Democratic hold | | | |

== District 8 ==
2024 Indiana's 8th congressional district election
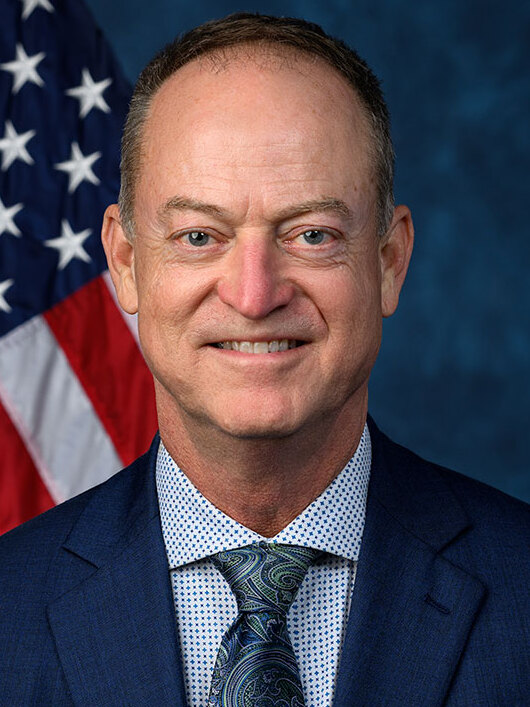

| Nominee | Mark Messmer | Erik Hurt |
| Party | Republican | Democratic |
| Popular vote | 219,941 | 95,311 |
| Percentage | 68.0% | 29.5% |
- County results Messmer: 50–60% 60–70% 70–80% 80–90%
U.S. Representative before election
Larry Bucshon
Republican
Elected U.S. Representative
Mark Messmer
Republican

The 8th district is located in southwest and west central Indiana, the district is anchored in Evansville and also includes Jasper, Princeton, Terre Haute, Vincennes and Washington. The incumbent was Republican Larry Bucshon, who was re-elected with 65.7% of the vote in 2022. On January 8, 2024, Bucshon announced he would not run for re-election, and would retire after serving seven terms.

=== Republican primary ===
==== Nominee ====
- Mark Messmer, former majority leader of the Indiana Senate (2018–2022) from the 48th district (2014–present)

==== Eliminated in the primary ====
- Jim Case, investment banker
- Jeremy Heath, healthcare case manager and perennial candidate
- John Hostettler, former U.S. representative for this district (1995–2007)
- Dominick Kavanaugh, engineering project manager
- Luke Misner, former Sullivan County commissioner
- Richard Moss, otolaryngologist and candidate for this district in 2016 and 2018
- Kristi Risk, chair of the Owen County Republican Party and candidate for this district in 2010 and 2012

==== Withdrawn ====
- Larry Bucshon, incumbent U.S. representative

==== Endorsements ====
John Hostettler

Organizations

- Indiana Right to Life (co-endorsement with Messmer)
Mark Messmer

Organizations

- AIPAC
- Indiana Right to Life (co-endorsement with Hostettler)
- Pro-Israel America
- Republican Jewish Coalition
- Susan B. Anthony Pro-Life America
Larry Bucshon (declined to run)

Organizations

- AIPAC

==== Fundraising ====
Campaign finance reports as of April 17, 2024
| Candidate | Raised | Spent | Cash on hand |
|---|---|---|---|
| John Hostettler (R) | $40,702 | $11,159 | $29,543 |
| Dominick Kavanaugh (R) | $528,162 (Note: $500,000 of this total was self-funded by Kavanaugh) | $286,785 | $241,376 |
| Mark Messmer (R) | $763,290 | $638,677 | $124,613 |
| Richard Moss (R) | $556,243 (Note: $545,000 of this total was self-funded by Moss) | $433,315 | $122,928 |
| Kristi Risk (R) | $70,094 (Note: $50,000 of this total was self-funded by Risk) | $10,480 | $59,613 |
Source: Federal Election Commission

==== Results ====
Primary results by county: Messmer: 20–30%; 30–40%; 40–50%; 60–70%; 70–80%; Hostettler: 20–30%; Risk: 30–40%; Misner: 20–30%

Republican primary results
| Party | Candidate | Votes | % |
|---|---|---|---|
| Republican | Mark Messmer | 30,668 | 38.5 |
| Republican | John Hostettler | 15,649 | 19.7 |
| Republican | Richard Moss | 11,227 | 14.1 |
| Republican | Dominick Kavanaugh | 9,397 | 11.8 |
| Republican | Kristi Risk | 7,350 | 9.2 |
| Republican | Luke Misner | 2,287 | 2.9 |
| Republican | Jim Case | 2,107 | 2.6 |
| Republican | Jeremy Heath | 944 | 1.2 |
| Total votes | | 79,629 | 100.0 |

=== Democratic primary ===
==== Nominee ====
Primary results by county: Hurt: 30–40%; 40–50%; 50–60%

- Erik Hurt, theater manager

==== Eliminated in the primary ====
- Peter Priest, software engineer and candidate for this district in 2022
- Edward Sein, sales manager
- Michael Talarzyk, school bus driver

==== Disqualified ====
- Kellie Moore, cook

==== Fundraising ====
Campaign finance reports as of April 17, 2024
| Candidate | Raised | Spent | Cash on hand |
|---|---|---|---|
| Kellie Moore (D) | $2,623 | $1,361 | $1,262 |
Source: Federal Election Commission

==== Results ====
Democratic primary results
| Party | Candidate | Votes | % |
|---|---|---|---|
| Democratic | Erik Hurt | 8,204 | 45.1 |
| Democratic | Edward Sein | 4,087 | 22.5 |
| Democratic | Michael Talarzyk | 3,796 | 20.9 |
| Democratic | Peter Priest | 2,098 | 11.5 |
| Total votes | | 18,185 | 100.0 |

=== Libertarian convention ===
==== Nominee ====
- Richard Fitzlaff, business development professional

=== General election ===
==== Predictions ====
| Source | Ranking | As of |
|---|---|---|
| The Cook Political Report | Solid R | February 2, 2023 |
| Inside Elections | Solid R | March 10, 2023 |
| Sabato's Crystal Ball | Safe R | February 23, 2023 |
| Elections Daily | Safe R | June 8, 2023 |
| CNalysis | Solid R | November 16, 2023 |

==== Results ====
2024 Indiana's 8th congressional district election
| Party | Candidate | Votes | % |
|---|---|---|---|
| Republican | Mark Messmer | 219,941 | 68.0 |
| Democratic | Erik Hurt | 95,311 | 29.5 |
| Libertarian | Richard Fitzlaff | 8,381 | 2.6 |
| Total votes | | 323,633 | 100.0 |
| Republican hold | | | |

== District 9 ==
2024 Indiana's 9th congressional district election
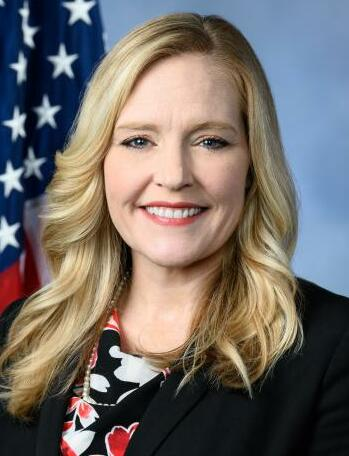

| Nominee | Erin Houchin | Tim Peck |
| Party | Republican | Democratic |
| Popular vote | 222,884 | 113,400 |
| Percentage | 64.5% | 32.8% |
- County results Houchin: 50–60% 60–70% 70–80% 80–90% Peck: 60–70%
U.S. Representative before election
Erin Houchin
Republican
Elected U.S. Representative
Erin Houchin
Republican

The 9th district is located in south-central and southeastern Indiana. The district stretches from Bloomington to the Indiana side of the Louisville metropolitan area. It is also home to Indiana University's flagship campus. The incumbent was Republican Erin Houchin, who was elected with 63.6% of the vote in 2022.

=== Republican primary ===
==== Nominee ====
- Erin Houchin, incumbent U.S. representative

==== Eliminated in the primary ====
- Hugh Doty, engineer

==== Endorsements ====
Erin Houchin

Organizations

- AIPAC
- Indiana Right to Life
- Maggie's List
- NRA Political Victory Fund
- U.S. Chamber of Commerce (post-primary)

=== Fundraising ===
Campaign finance reports as of April 17, 2024
| Candidate | Raised | Spent | Cash on hand |
|---|---|---|---|
| Erin Houchin (R) | $1,022,423 | $707,982 | $726,665 |
Source: Federal Election Commission

==== Results ====
Republican primary results
| Party | Candidate | Votes | % |
|---|---|---|---|
| Republican | Erin Houchin (incumbent) | 55,278 | 79.8 |
| Republican | Hugh Doty | 13,983 | 20.2 |
| Total votes | | 69,261 | 100.0 |

=== Democratic primary ===
==== Nominee ====
- Tim Peck, doctor

==== Eliminated in the primary ====
- Liam Dorris, calibration technician and candidate for this district in 2020 and 2022

=== Fundraising ===
Campaign finance reports as of April 17, 2024
| Candidate | Raised | Spent | Cash on hand |
|---|---|---|---|
| Tim Peck (D) | $162,719 (Note: $30,000 of this total was self-funded by Peck) | $100,232 | $62,486 |
Source: Federal Election Commission

==== Results ====
Democratic primary results
| Party | Candidate | Votes | % |
|---|---|---|---|
| Democratic | Tim Peck | 14,606 | 66.1 |
| Democratic | Liam Dorris | 7,493 | 33.9 |
| Total votes | | 22,099 | 100.0 |

=== Libertarian convention ===
==== Nominee ====
- Russell Brooksbank, mechanic and nominee for this district in 2016

=== General election ===
==== Predictions ====
| Source | Ranking | As of |
|---|---|---|
| The Cook Political Report | Solid R | February 2, 2023 |
| Inside Elections | Solid R | March 10, 2023 |
| Sabato's Crystal Ball | Safe R | February 23, 2023 |
| Elections Daily | Safe R | June 8, 2023 |
| CNalysis | Solid R | November 16, 2023 |

==== Forums ====
2024 United States House of Representatives elections in Indiana 9th congressional district forum
| No. | Date | Host | Moderator | Link | Participants | | |
| Key: P Participant A Absent N Non-invitee I Invitee W Withdrawn | | | | | | | |
| Key: P Participant A Absent N Non-invitee I Invitee W Withdrawn | | | | | Houchin | Peck | Brooksbank |
|---|---|---|---|---|---|---|---|
| 1 | September 28, 2024 | League of Women Voters | Sonia Leerkamp | Video | A | P | P |

==== Results ====
2024 Indiana's 9th congressional district election
| Party | Candidate | Votes | % |
|---|---|---|---|
| Republican | Erin Houchin (incumbent) | 222,884 | 64.5 |
| Democratic | Timothy Peck | 113,400 | 32.8 |
| Libertarian | Russell Brooksbank | 9,454 | 2.7 |
| Total votes | | 345,738 | 100.0 |
| Republican hold | | | |

== Notes ==
Partisan clients
