= Bill Frazier (politician) =

American politician

Member of the Indiana Senate from the 14th district
- In office November 19, 1968 – November 17, 1970
- Preceded by: Vincent Pittenger
- Succeeded by: Don Park

Personal details
- Born: November 8, 1936 (age 89) Muncie, Indiana, U.S.
- Party: Republican
- Spouse: Joan (d. 2023)
- Children: 6 (2 deceased)
- Education: Ball State University

Bill Frazier (born November 8, 1936) is an American farmer, politician, and perennial candidate from the state of Indiana. A member of the Republican Party, he represented the 14th district in the Indiana Senate from 1968 to 1970.

== Political career ==
Frazier was elected to the Indiana Senate in a 1968 special election held after the death of Republican incumbent Vincent Pittenger. Frazier won by a 54% to 46% margin, defeating Democratic former state senator Von Eichhorn. He ran for a full term in 1970, but lost to Democrat Don Park. Over the next 30 years, Frazier ran for office numerous times, including campaigns for state senate and U.S. House in three different congressional districts.

In 2000, Frazier campaigned for the 2nd congressional district as an independent, hoping to fill the seat left open by Republican David McIntosh's retirement. Frazier spent $300,000 of his own money on the campaign, running ads critical of the North American Free Trade Agreement. He received 10% of the vote compared to 39% for Democrat Robert Rock and 51% for the winner, talk radio host (and future governor and vice president) Mike Pence. When Pence ran for governor in 2012, Frazier again ran for his seat, now numbered as the 6th district. He finished fourth in the primary, taking 10% of the vote as the primary was won by Luke Messer. In January 2024, Frazier filed to run for the district once again. The seat was open due to the retirement of Republican incumbent Greg Pence, brother of Mike Pence. In the Republican primary, Frazier once again finished fourth with 10% of the vote.

== Personal life ==
Frazier lives in Muncie. He is a farmer and formerly operated a mobile home park.
