= Kathy Kreag Richardson =

American politician

Kathy K. Richardson
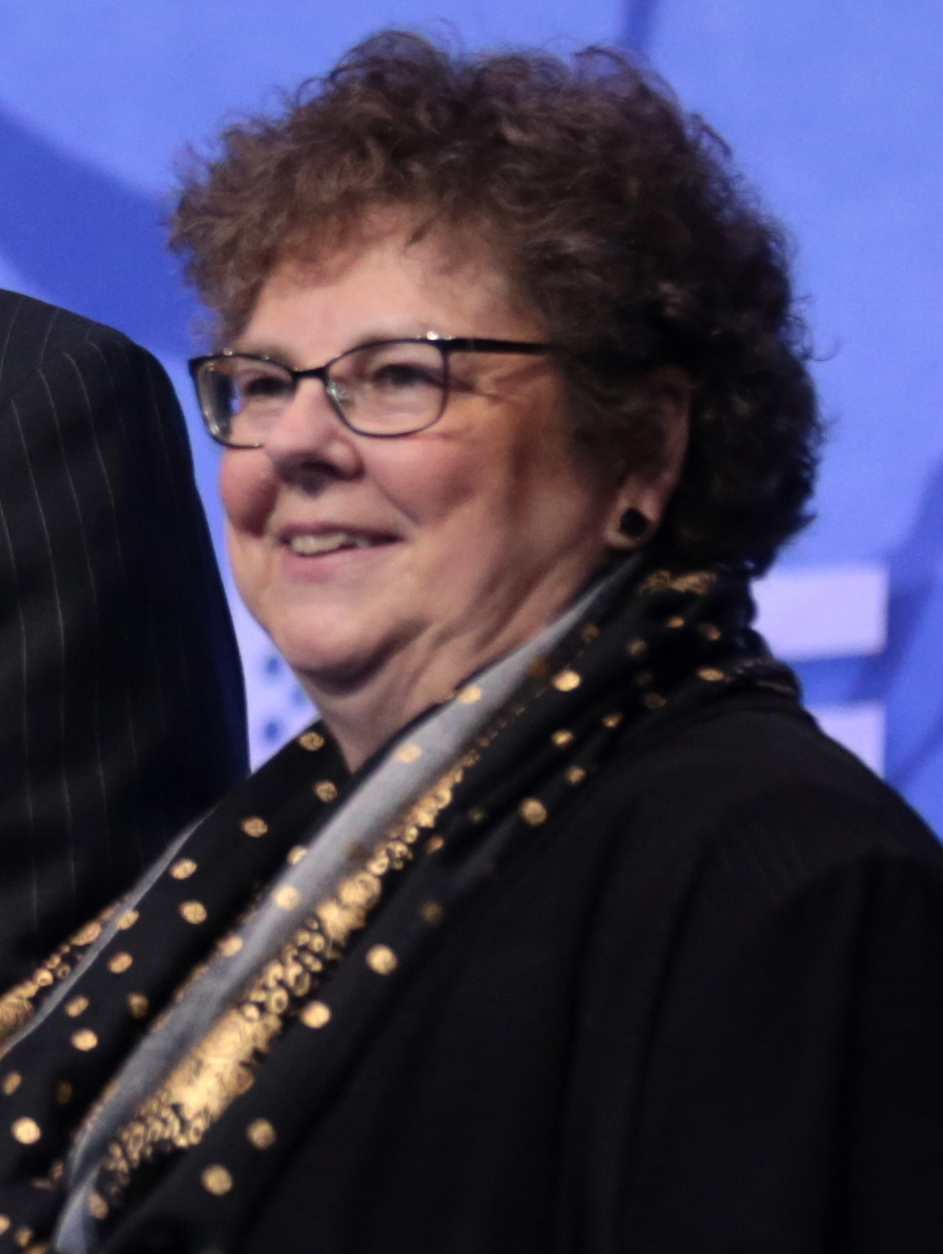

Member of the Indiana House of Representatives from the 29th district
- In office November 4, 1992 – November 7, 2018
- Preceded by: Brad Bayliff
- Succeeded by: Chuck Goodrich

Personal details
- Born: April 28, 1956 (age 70) Noblesville, Indiana
- Party: Republican
- Occupation: Politician

Kathy Kreag Richardson (born April 28, 1956) is an American politician who served as a member of the Indiana House of Representatives for the 29th district from 1993 to 2018.

== Career ==
In December 2017, Richardson announced that she would not be running for reelection in 2018, but would seek the office of Hamilton County clerk of the Circuit Court. She previously served as clerk of the Indiana Circuit Court from 1984 to 1991.
