= 2024 Indiana elections =

Indiana elections, 2024
- November 5, 2024

The Indiana general election was held on November 5, 2024. Primary elections took place on May 7, 2024.

== Federal offices ==
=== United States Senate ===
Incumbent one-term Republican senator Mike Braun has declined to run for a second term in office, opting instead to run for governor.

== State elections ==
=== Governor ===
Incumbent Republican governor Eric Holcomb is term-limited and cannot seek re-election to a third consecutive term in office.

=== Attorney general ===
Attorney General Todd Rokita ran for re-election.
