= Chuck Goodrich =

American politician (born 1969)

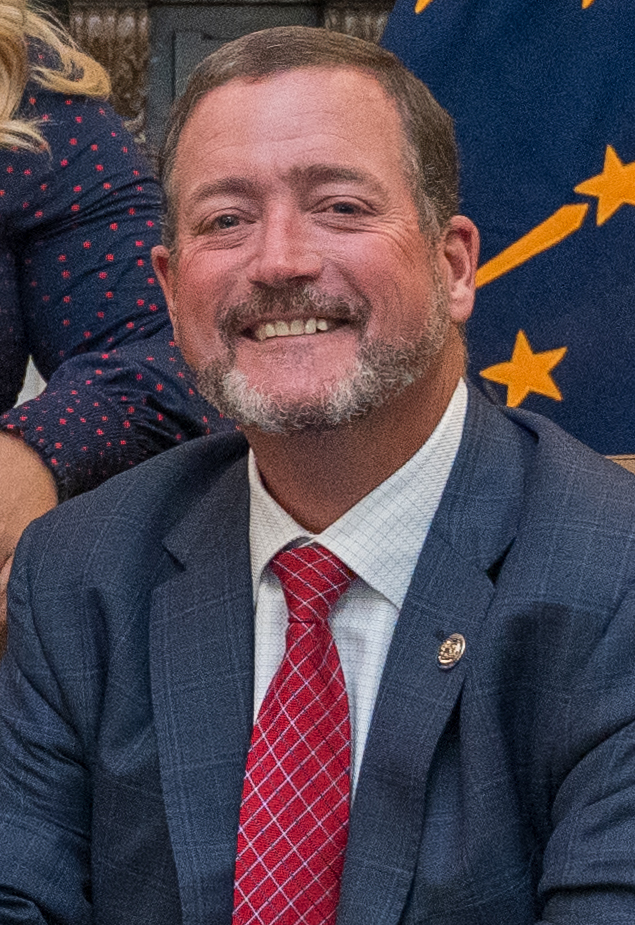

Indiana Secretary of Commerce
- Incumbent
- Assumed office July 13, 2026
- Governor: Mike Braun
- Preceded by: David Adams

Member of the Indiana House of Representatives from the 29th district
- In office November 7, 2018 – November 18, 2024
- Preceded by: Kathy Kreag Richardson
- Succeeded by: Alaina Shonkwiler

Personal details
- Born: Charles Goodrich; November 9, 1969 (age 56) Roann, Indiana, U.S.
- Party: Republican
- Spouse: Tricia
- Children: 4
- Education: Vincennes University (AS); Purdue University (BS)

Charles "Chuck" Goodrich (born November 9, 1969) is an American politician and businessman who last served as a member of the Indiana House of Representatives from the 29th district. He was in office from 2018 to 2024. He is currently the Indiana Secretary of Commerce.

== Early life and education ==
Goodrich was born in Roann, Indiana, in 1969. He earned an Associate of Science degree in architectural design from Vincennes University, a Bachelor of Science in building construction management from Purdue University.

== Career ==
Goodrich is the CEO of Gaylor Electric, an electrical contracting company. He is a member of the Associated Builders and Contractors Executive Committee and is a board member of the Riverview Health Foundation and Purdue Construction Advisory Council for Building Construction Management. He was elected to the Indiana House of Representatives in November 2018.

=== 2024 congressional campaign ===
In January 2024, Goodrich announced that he would run for the U.S. House of Representatives in Indiana's 5th congressional district to succeed Victoria Spartz, who announced that she would not seek re-election to a third term. On February 5, 2024, Spartz announced that she in fact would seek re-election. Goodrich decided to remain a candidate against Spartz. Goodrich would ultimately end up being narrowly defeated by Spartz in the Republican primary, losing by a margin of only 4,809 votes (5.9%).

=== Indiana secretary of commerce ===
In June 2026, Indiana Governor Mike Braun announced that Goodrich would become the Secretary of Commerce for the state and Goodrich began that position in July 2026.
