= 2012 United States House of Representatives elections in Indiana =

- November 6, 2012

All 9 Indiana seats to the United States House of Representatives
| | Majority party | Minority party |
|---|---|---|
| Party | Republican | Democratic |
| Last election | 6 | 3 |
| Seats won | 7 | 2 |
| Seat change | ▲1 | ▼1 |
| Popular vote | 1,351,760 | 1,142,554 |
| Percentage | 52.93% | 44.74% |
| Swing | ▼2.72% | ▲5.86% |

Republican hold Republican gain
Democratic hold
Republican
40–50%
50–60%
60–70%
70–80%
Democratic
40–50%
50–60%
60–70%

The 2012 United States House of Representatives elections in Indiana were held on Tuesday, November 6, 2012, to elect the nine U.S. representatives from the state, one from each of the state's nine congressional districts. The elections coincided with the elections of other federal and state offices, including a quadrennial presidential election, an election to the U.S. Senate, and a gubernatorial election.

== Overview ==
United States House of Representatives elections in Indiana, 2012
| Party | Votes | Percentage | Seats | +/– |
|---|---|---|---|---|
| Republican | 1,351,760 | 52.93% | 7 | +1 |
| Democratic | 1,142,554 | 44.74% | 2 | -1 |
| Libertarian | 59,429 | 2.33% | 0 | - |
| Independents | 3 | <0.01% | 0 | - |
| Totals | 2,553,746 | 100.00% | 9 | - |

== Redistricting ==
A redistricting bill was passed by both houses of the Indiana General Assembly in April 2011 and signed into law by Governor Mitch Daniels on May 10, 2011.

The newly drawn map was designed to produce seven districts which are favorable to the Republican Party and two which favor the Democratic Party. Republicans described the districts as being more compact and more in keeping with existing county boundaries than the previous map, while Democrats argued that the map was intended to protect Republican incumbents and help the Republican Party win the 2nd district.

== District 1 ==
2012 Indiana's 1st congressional district election
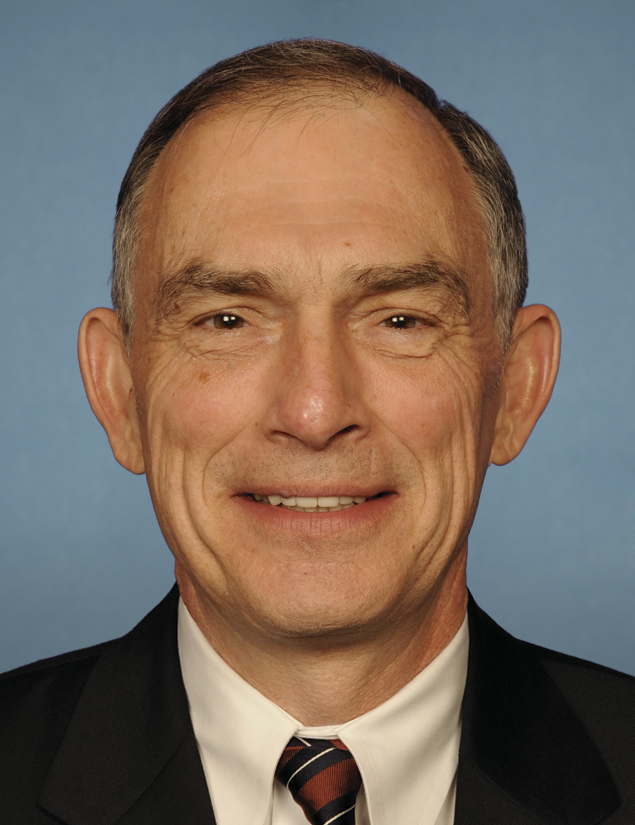

| Nominee | Pete Visclosky | Joel Phelps |
| Party | Democratic | Republican |
| Popular vote | 187,743 | 91,291 |
| Percentage | 67.3% | 32.7% |
- County results Visclosky: 60–70%
U.S. Representative before election
Pete Visclosky
Democratic
Elected U.S. Representative
Pete Visclosky
Democratic

The district, based in the suburbs and exurbs of Chicago, acquired parts of LaPorte County, including Michigan City, in redistricting.

=== Democratic primary ===
==== Candidates ====
===== Nominee =====
- Pete Visclosky, incumbent U.S. Representative

==== Primary results ====
Democratic primary results
| Party | Candidate | Votes | % |
|---|---|---|---|
| Democratic | Pete Visclosky (incumbent) | 42,219 | 100.0 |
| Total votes | | 42,219 | 100.0 |

=== Republican primary ===
==== Candidates ====
===== Nominee =====
- Joel Phelps, industrial engineer

==== Primary results ====
Republican primary results
| Party | Candidate | Votes | % |
|---|---|---|---|
| Republican | Joel Phelps | 11,952 | 100.0 |
| Total votes | | 11,952 | 100.0 |

=== General election ===
==== Predictions ====
| Source | Ranking | As of |
|---|---|---|
| The Cook Political Report | Safe D | November 5, 2012 |
| Rothenberg | Safe D | November 2, 2012 |
| Roll Call | Safe D | November 4, 2012 |
| Sabato's Crystal Ball | Safe D | November 5, 2012 |
| NY Times | Safe D | November 4, 2012 |
| RCP | Safe D | November 4, 2012 |
| The Hill | Safe D | November 4, 2012 |

==== Results ====
Indiana's 1st congressional district, 2012
| Party | Candidate | Votes | % |
|---|---|---|---|
| Democratic | Pete Visclosky (incumbent) | 187,743 | 67.3 |
| Republican | Joel Phelps | 91,291 | 32.7 |
| Total votes | | 279,034 | 100.0 |
| Democratic hold | | | |

== District 2 ==
2012 Indiana's 2nd congressional district election
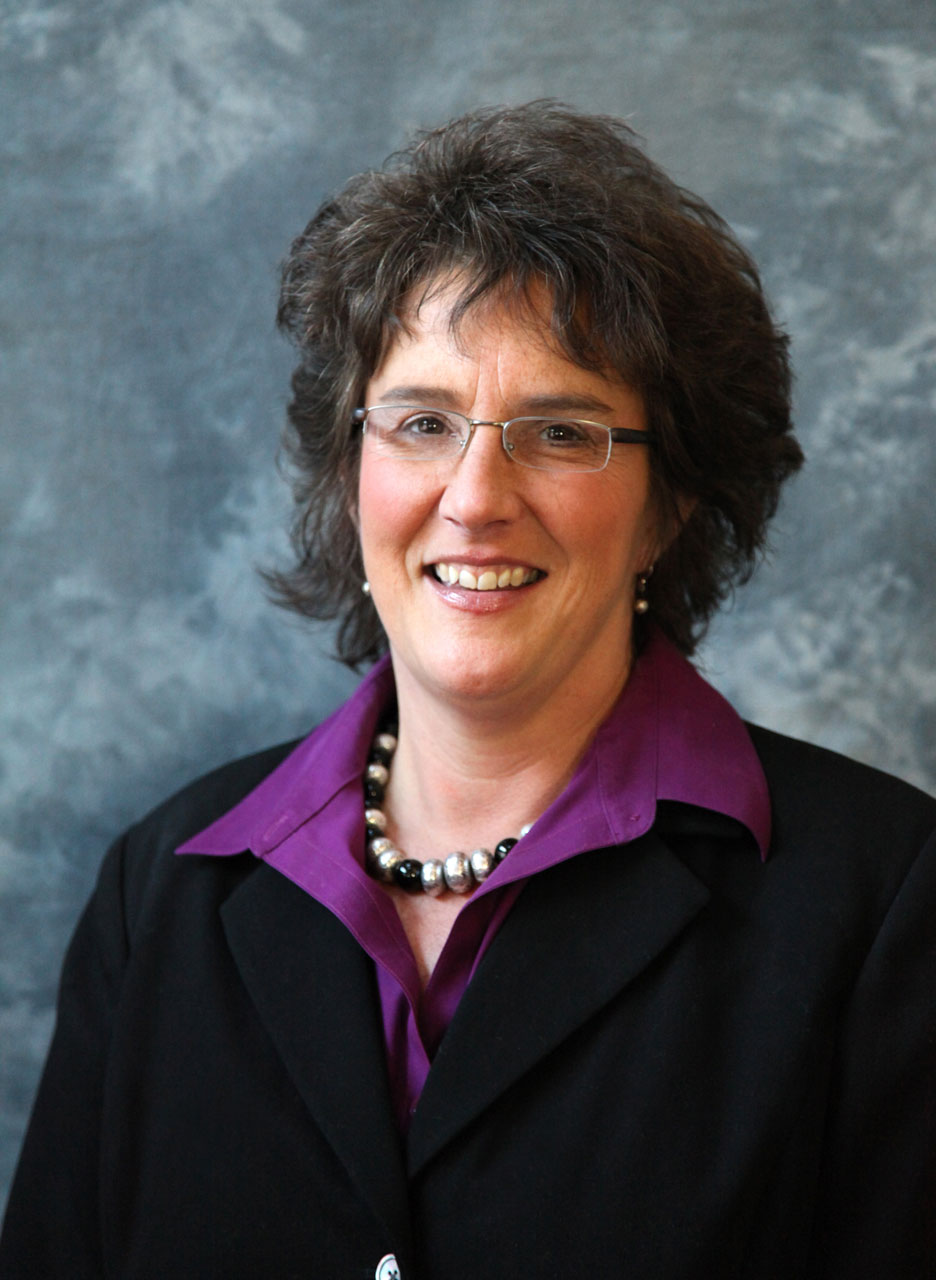

| Nominee | Jackie Walorski | Brendan Mullen |
| Party | Republican | Democratic |
| Popular vote | 134,033 | 130,113 |
| Percentage | 49.0% | 47.6% |
- County results Swihart: 50–60% 60–70% Mullen: 50–60%
U.S. Representative before election
Joe Donnelly
Democratic
Elected U.S. Representative
Jackie Walorski
Republican

In redistricting, parts of the state which typically favor Republicans, including Elkhart County, Miami County, Wabash County and much of Kosciusko County, were moved into the 2nd district, while Democratic-leaning areas such as Kokomo and part of LaPorte County were removed from the district.

=== Democratic primary ===
Prior to announcing his Senate campaign, Donnelly commented that he was confident that a Democrat would be able to win the district, noting that then-Senator Barack Obama would have received 49% of the vote in the district in the 2008 presidential election had it been held under the newly drawn boundaries.

==== Candidates ====
===== Nominee =====
- Brendan Mullen, Army veteran and military contractor

===== Eliminated in primary =====
- Dan Morrison, small business owner

===== Withdrawn =====
- Andrew Straw, attorney and an assistant dean at the Indiana University Maurer School of Law

===== Declined =====
- Joe Donnelly, incumbent U.S. Representative (ran for U.S. Senate)

==== Primary results ====
Democratic primary results
| Party | Candidate | Votes | % |
|---|---|---|---|
| Democratic | Brendan Mullen | 11,218 | 54.1 |
| Democratic | Dan Morrison | 9,519 | 45.9 |
| Total votes | | 20,737 | 100.0 |

=== Republican primary ===
==== Candidates ====
===== Nominee =====
- Jackie Walorski, former state representative and nominee for this seat in 2010

===== Eliminated in primary =====
- Greg Andrews, physician

===== Withdrawn =====
- Mitch Feikes, real estate developer and broker

==== Primary results ====
Republican primary results
| Party | Candidate | Votes | % |
|---|---|---|---|
| Republican | Jackie Walorski | 46,873 | 72.8 |
| Republican | Greg Andrews | 17,522 | 27.2 |
| Total votes | | 64,395 | 100.0 |

=== Libertarian primary ===
==== Candidates ====
===== Nominee =====
- Joe Ruiz

=== Green primary ===
Andrew Straw, an attorney, switched from the Democratic Party to Green Party and ran for this seat. Straw was an Indiana Supreme Court analyst and an assistant dean at the Indiana University Maurer School of Law in charge of the International Program. He was, however, disqualified from the ballot in July.

=== General election ===
==== Endorsements ====
Brendan Mullen (D)

Organizations

- Blue Dog Coalition
- Democratic Congressional Campaign Committee "Red to Blue" Program
Jackie Walorski (R)

Organizations

- National Republican Congressional Committee "Young Guns" Program

==== Predictions ====
| Source | Ranking | As of |
|---|---|---|
| The Cook Political Report | Likely R (flip) | November 5, 2012 |
| Rothenberg | Safe R (flip) | November 2, 2012 |
| Roll Call | Likely R (flip) | November 4, 2012 |
| Sabato's Crystal Ball | Likely R (flip) | November 5, 2012 |
| NY Times | Safe D | November 4, 2012 |
| RCP | Likely R (flip) | November 4, 2012 |
| The Hill | Lean R (flip) | November 4, 2012 |

==== Results ====
Indiana's 2nd congressional district, 2012
| Party | Candidate | Votes | % |
|---|---|---|---|
| Republican | Jackie Walorski | 134,033 | 49.0 |
| Democratic | Brendan Mullen | 130,113 | 47.6 |
| Libertarian | Joe Ruiz | 9,326 | 3.4 |
| Independent | Kenneth R. Lunce Jr. (write-in) | 3 | 0.0 |
| Total votes | | 273,475 | 100.0 |
| Republican gain from Democratic | | | |

== District 3 ==
2012 Indiana's 3rd congressional district election
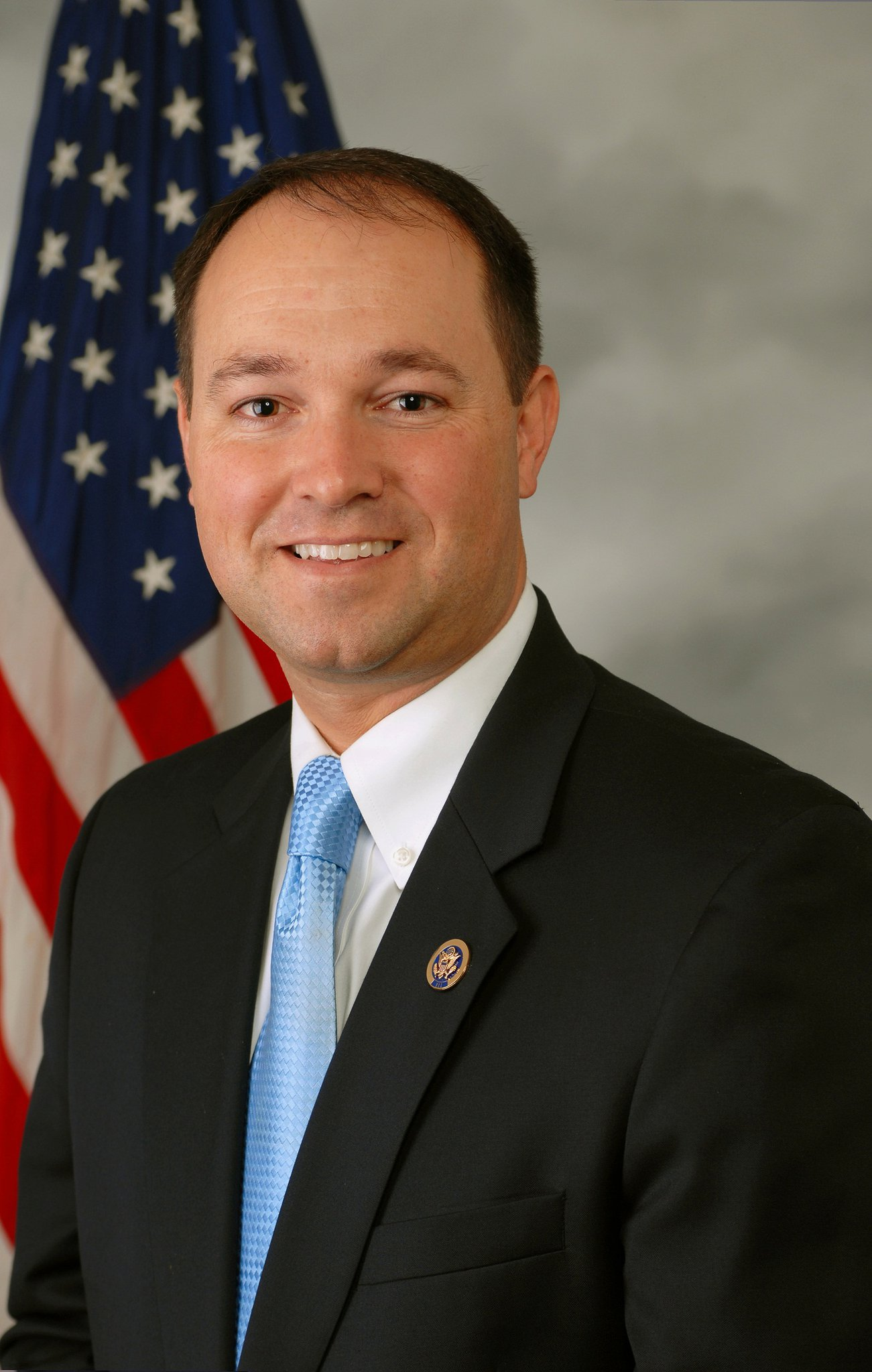

| Nominee | Marlin Stutzman | Kevin Boyd |
| Party | Republican | Democratic |
| Popular vote | 187,872 | 92,363 |
| Percentage | 67.0% | 33.0% |
- County results Stutzman: 50–60% 60–70% 70–80%
U.S. Representative before election
Marlin Stutzman
Republican
Elected U.S. Representative
Marlin Stutzman
Republican

The 3rd district was expected to remain favorable to Republicans. Among the changes made in redistricting were the removal of Elkhart County from the 4th district to the 2nd, and the addition of areas south of Fort Wayne, which might have made Stutzman vulnerable to a primary challenge.

=== Republican primary ===
==== Candidates ====
===== Nominee =====
- Marlin Stutzman, incumbent U.S. Representative

==== Primary results ====
Republican primary results
| Party | Candidate | Votes | % |
|---|---|---|---|
| Republican | Marlin Stutzman (incumbent) | 74,812 | 100.0 |
| Total votes | | 74,812 | 100.0 |

=== Democratic primary ===
==== Candidates ====
===== Nominee =====
- Kevin Boyd, pastor of Fort Wayne's Trinity Presbyterian Church

===== Eliminated in primary =====
- Stephen Hope
- Justin Kuhnle, family case manager
- John Roberson, former police officer
- Tommy Schrader
- David Sowards

==== Primary results ====
Democratic primary results
| Party | Candidate | Votes | % |
|---|---|---|---|
| Democratic | Kevin R. Boyd | 5,985 | 47.8 |
| Democratic | Tommy A. Schrader | 1,694 | 13.5 |
| Democratic | Stephen G. Hope | 1,441 | 11.5 |
| Democratic | Justin Kuhnle | 1,265 | 10.1 |
| Democratic | David Sowards | 1,172 | 9.4 |
| Democratic | John Forrest Roberson | 966 | 7.7 |
| Total votes | | 12,523 | 100.0 |

=== General election ===
==== Predictions ====
| Source | Ranking | As of |
|---|---|---|
| The Cook Political Report | Safe R | November 5, 2012 |
| Rothenberg | Safe R | November 2, 2012 |
| Roll Call | Safe R | November 4, 2012 |
| Sabato's Crystal Ball | Safe R | November 5, 2012 |
| NY Times | Safe R | November 4, 2012 |
| RCP | Safe R | November 4, 2012 |
| The Hill | Safe R | November 4, 2012 |

==== Results ====
Indiana's 3rd congressional district, 2012
| Party | Candidate | Votes | % |
|---|---|---|---|
| Republican | Marlin Stutzman (incumbent) | 187,872 | 67.0 |
| Democratic | Kevin Boyd | 92,363 | 33.0 |
| Total votes | | 280,235 | 100.0 |
| Republican hold | | | |

== District 4 ==
2012 Indiana's 4th congressional district election
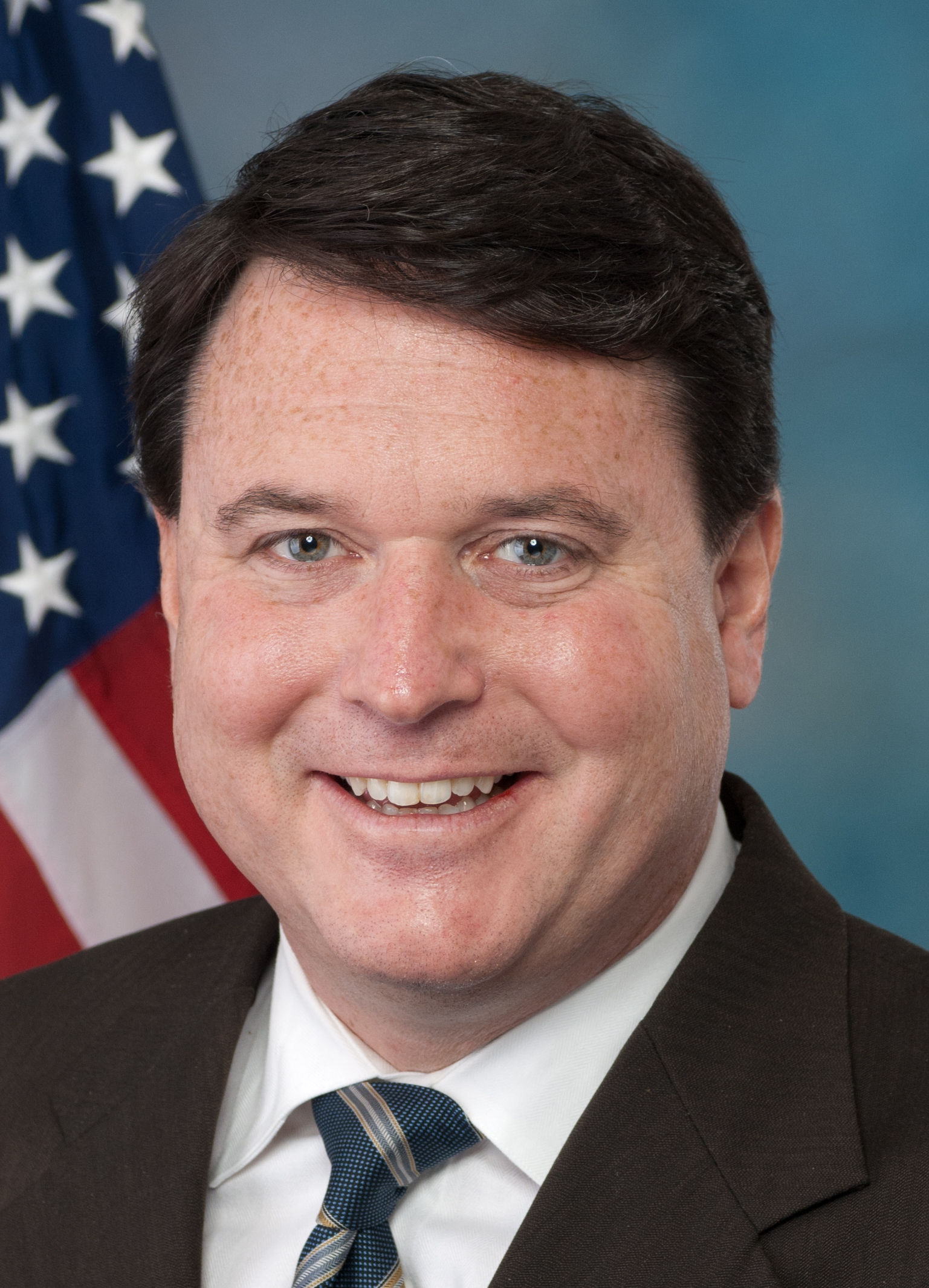

| Nominee | Todd Rokita | Tara Nelson |
| Party | Republican | Democratic |
| Popular vote | 168,688 | 93,015 |
| Percentage | 61.9% | 34.2% |
- County results Rokita: 50–60% 60–70% 70–80%
U.S. Representative before election
Todd Rokita
Republican
Elected U.S. Representative
Todd Rokita
Republican

Republican incumbent Todd Rokita ran for re-election in 2012. Rokita's home lies "about 500 yards" outside the boundaries of the newly drawn 4th district, a phenomenon he attributed in May 2011 to "a kind of comeuppance thing" on the part of members of the Indiana General Assembly in return for his having supported a nonpartisan redistricting process during his tenure as Secretary of State of Indiana. Sue Landske, a Republican member of the Indiana Senate, denied that this was the case. The 4th district was expected to remain favorable to Republicans.

=== Republican primary ===
==== Candidates ====
===== Nominee =====
- Todd Rokita, incumbent U.S. Representative

==== Primary results ====
Republican primary results
| Party | Candidate | Votes | % |
|---|---|---|---|
| Republican | Todd Rokita (incumbent) | 73,089 | 100.0 |
| Total votes | | 73,089 | 100.0 |

=== Democratic primary ===
==== Candidates ====
===== Nominee =====
- Tara Nelson, information technology project manager

===== Eliminated in primary =====
- Lester Moore, former Newton County Assessor

==== Primary results ====
Democratic primary results
| Party | Candidate | Votes | % |
|---|---|---|---|
| Democratic | Tara E. Nelson | 7,018 | 58.3 |
| Democratic | Lester Terry Moore | 5,010 | 41.7 |
| Total votes | | 12,028 | 100.0 |

=== Libertarian primary ===
==== Candidates ====
===== Nominee =====
- Benjamin Gehlhausen, economics and professional flight technology major at Purdue University

=== General election ===
==== Predictions ====
| Source | Ranking | As of |
|---|---|---|
| The Cook Political Report | Safe R | November 5, 2012 |
| Rothenberg | Safe R | November 2, 2012 |
| Roll Call | Safe R | November 4, 2012 |
| Sabato's Crystal Ball | Safe R | November 5, 2012 |
| NY Times | Safe R | November 4, 2012 |
| RCP | Safe R | November 4, 2012 |
| The Hill | Safe R | November 4, 2012 |

==== Results ====
Indiana's 4th congressional district, 2012
| Party | Candidate | Votes | % |
|---|---|---|---|
| Republican | Todd Rokita (incumbent) | 168,688 | 61.9 |
| Democratic | Tara Nelson | 93,015 | 34.2 |
| Libertarian | Benjamin Gehlhausen | 10,565 | 3.9 |
| Total votes | | 272,268 | 100.0 |
| Republican hold | | | |

== District 5 ==
2012 Indiana's 5th congressional district election
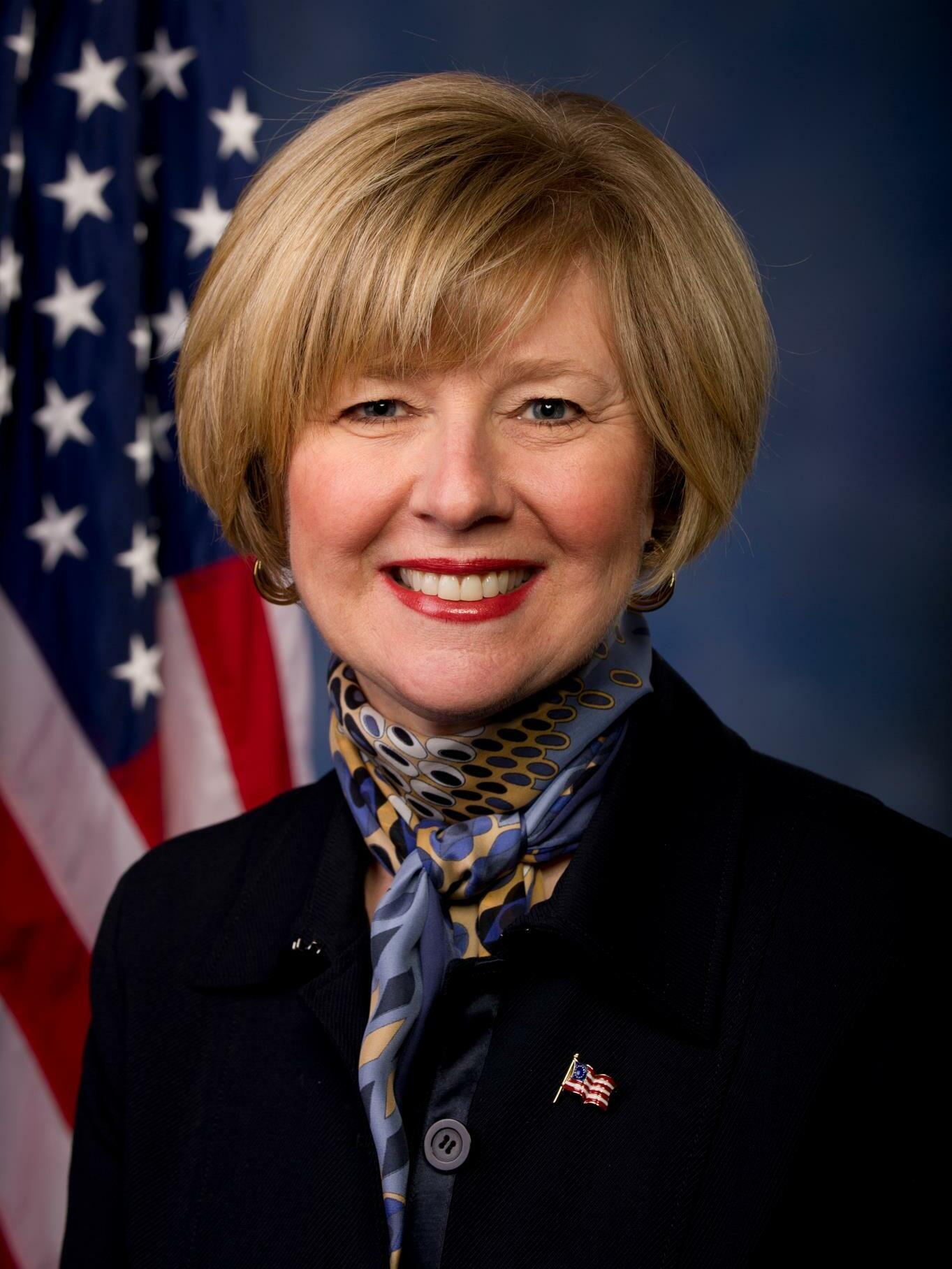

| Nominee | Susan Brooks | Scott Reske |
| Party | Republican | Democratic |
| Popular vote | 194,570 | 125,347 |
| Percentage | 58.4% | 37.6% |
- County results Brooks: 40–50% 50–60% 60–70% 70–80% Reske: 50–60%
U.S. Representative before election
Dan Burton
Republican
Elected U.S. Representative
Susan Brooks
Republican

The 5th district continues to include Hamilton County and the north side of Indianapolis, but received Democratic-leaning areas in northern Marion County and Madison County, and lost rural areas near Fort Wayne. The district was expected to continue to favor Republicans.

Republican incumbent Dan Burton, who had represented the 5th district since 2003 and previously represented the 6th district from 1983, retired rather than seeking re-election in 2012.

=== Republican primary ===
==== Candidates ====
===== Nominee =====
- Susan Brooks, former United States Attorney for the Southern District of Indiana

===== Eliminated in primary =====
- Jason Anderson
- Jack Lugar, attorney
- John McGoff, physician and candidate for this seat in 2008 & 2010
- David McIntosh, former U.S. Representative and lobbyist
- Matthew Mount
- Bill Salin, business analyst and Air Force veteran
- Wayne Seybold, Mayor of Marion and former Olympic pair skater

===== Withdrawn =====
- Dan Burton, incumbent U.S. Representative

===== Declined =====
- Mike Delph, state senator

==== Primary results ====
Republican primary results
| Party | Candidate | Votes | % |
|---|---|---|---|
| Republican | Susan Brooks | 31,185 | 30.2 |
| Republican | David McIntosh | 30,175 | 29.2 |
| Republican | John McGoff | 23,773 | 23.0 |
| Republican | Wayne Seybold | 11,874 | 11.5 |
| Republican | Jack Lugar | 4,758 | 4.6 |
| Republican | Jason Anderson | 1,036 | 1.0 |
| Republican | Bill Salin | 869 | 0.8 |
| Republican | Matthew Mount | 453 | 0.4 |
| Total votes | | 103,254 | 100.0 |

=== Democratic primary ===
==== Candidates ====
===== Nominee =====
- Scott Reske, state representative,

===== Eliminated in primary =====
- Tony Long, general motors retiree

==== Primary results ====
Democratic primary results
| Party | Candidate | Votes | % |
|---|---|---|---|
| Democratic | Scott Reske | 13,175 | 63.1 |
| Democratic | Tony Long | 7,692 | 36.9 |
| Total votes | | 20,867 | 100.0 |

=== Libertarian primary ===
==== Candidates ====
===== Nominee =====
- Chard Reid, economics and finance teacher at Plainfield High School

=== General election ===
==== Endorsements ====
Susan Brooks (R)

Organizations

- National Republican Congressional Committee "Vanguard" Program

==== Predictions ====
| Source | Ranking | As of |
|---|---|---|
| The Cook Political Report | Safe R | November 5, 2012 |
| Rothenberg | Safe R | November 2, 2012 |
| Roll Call | Safe R | November 4, 2012 |
| Sabato's Crystal Ball | Safe R | November 5, 2012 |
| NY Times | Safe R | November 4, 2012 |
| RCP | Safe R | November 4, 2012 |
| The Hill | Safe R | November 4, 2012 |

==== Results ====
Indiana's 5th congressional district, 2012
| Party | Candidate | Votes | % |
|---|---|---|---|
| Republican | Susan Brooks | 194,570 | 58.4 |
| Democratic | Scott Reske | 125,347 | 37.6 |
| Libertarian | Chard Reid | 13,442 | 4.0 |
| Total votes | | 333,359 | 100.0 |
| Republican hold | | | |

== District 6 ==
2012 Indiana's 6th congressional district election
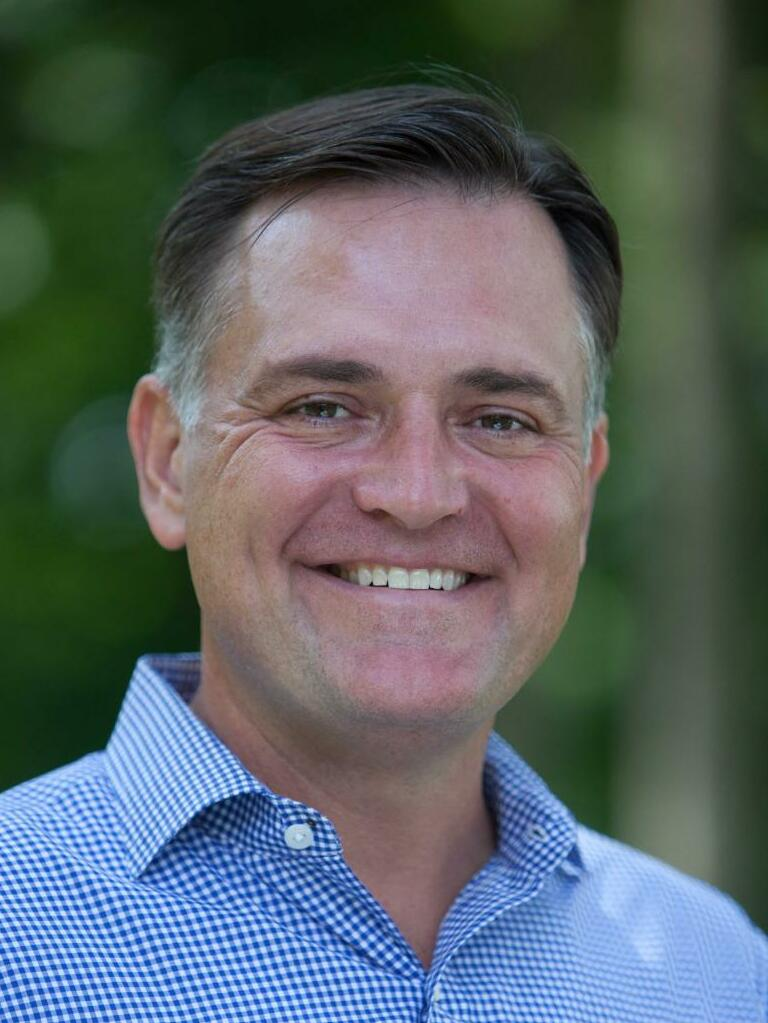

| Nominee | Luke Messer | Brad Bookout | Rex Bell |
| Party | Republican | Democratic | Libertarian |
| Popular vote | 162,613 | 96,678 | 15,962 |
| Percentage | 59.1% | 35.1% | 5.8% |
- County results Messer: 40–50% 50–60% 60–70% 70–80% Bookout: 50–60%
U.S. Representative before election
Mike Pence
Republican
Elected U.S. Representative
Luke Messer
Republican

The 6th district was made more favorable to Republicans in redistricting, and now stretches from Muncie to the Ohio River.

Republican incumbent Mike Pence announced in May 2011 that he would run for Governor of Indiana rather than for re-election to the House of Representatives.

=== Republican primary ===
==== Candidates ====
===== Nominee =====
- Luke Messer, former state representative, former executive director of the Indiana Republican Party, and candidate for the 5th District in 2010

===== Eliminated in primary =====
- Don Bates Jr., financial adviser and candidate for Senate in 2010
- Bill Frazier, former state senator
- Travis Hankins, developer and candidate for 9th District in 2010
- John Hatter, human resources director at Ivy Tech Community College
- Joe Sizemore, factory worker
- Allen Smith, Bartholomew County coroner and The Biggest Loser contestant
- Joseph S. Van Wye Sr., part-time service technician and part-time worker for Lifetime Resources

===== Declined =====
- Nate LaMar, president of the Henry County Council
- Jean Lesing, state senator
- Mike Pence, incumbent U.S. Representative
- Andrew Phipps, retired educator and candidate for Indiana Senate in 2002 and 2006
- Mike Sodrel, former U.S. Representative
- T.J. Thompson, candidate for this seat in 2010

==== Primary results ====
Republican primary results
| Party | Candidate | Votes | % |
|---|---|---|---|
| Republican | Luke Messer | 32,859 | 40.3 |
| Republican | Travis Hankins | 23,276 | 28.6 |
| Republican | Don Bates Jr. | 10,913 | 13.4 |
| Republican | Bill Frazier | 8,446 | 10.4 |
| Republican | Joe Sizemore | 2,346 | 2.9 |
| Republican | Allen K. Smith II | 1,679 | 2.1 |
| Republican | Joseph S. Van Wye, Sr | 989 | 1.2 |
| Republican | John Hatter | 917 | 1.1 |
| Total votes | | 81,425 | 100.0 |

=== Democratic primary ===
==== Candidates ====
===== Nominee =====
- Bradley Bookout, former Delaware County council member

===== Eliminated in primary =====
- Dan Bolling, biotech entrepreneur
- Jim Crone, sociology professor at Hanover College
- Susan Hall Heitzman, small business owner
- George Holland, salesman

===== Declined =====
- Lane Siekman, attorney;
- Barry Welsh, nominee for this seat in 2006, 2008 & 2010

==== Primary results ====
Democratic primary results
| Party | Candidate | Votes | % |
|---|---|---|---|
| Democratic | Bradley T. Bookout | 8,278 | 30.9 |
| Democratic | Susan Hall Heitzman | 7,077 | 26.5 |
| Democratic | Jim Crone | 5,611 | 21.0 |
| Democratic | Dan Bolling | 3,719 | 13.9 |
| Democratic | George T. Holland | 2,059 | 7.7 |
| Total votes | | 26,744 | 100.0 |

=== Libertarian primary ===
==== Candidates ====
===== Nominee =====
- Rex Bell, owner of a contracting business in the New Castle area

=== General election ===
==== Endorsements ====
Luke Messer (R)

Organizations

- National Republican Congressional Committee "Vanguard" Program

==== Predictions ====
| Source | Ranking | As of |
|---|---|---|
| The Cook Political Report | Safe R | November 5, 2012 |
| Rothenberg | Safe R | November 2, 2012 |
| Roll Call | Safe R | November 4, 2012 |
| Sabato's Crystal Ball | Safe R | November 5, 2012 |
| NY Times | Safe R | November 4, 2012 |
| RCP | Safe R | November 4, 2012 |
| The Hill | Safe R | November 4, 2012 |

==== Results ====
Indiana's 6th congressional district, 2012
| Party | Candidate | Votes | % |
|---|---|---|---|
| Republican | Luke Messer | 162,613 | 59.1 |
| Democratic | Brad Bookout | 96,678 | 35.1 |
| Libertarian | Rex Bell | 15,962 | 5.8 |
| Total votes | | 275,253 | 100.0 |
| Republican hold | | | |

== District 7 ==
2012 Indiana's 7th congressional district election
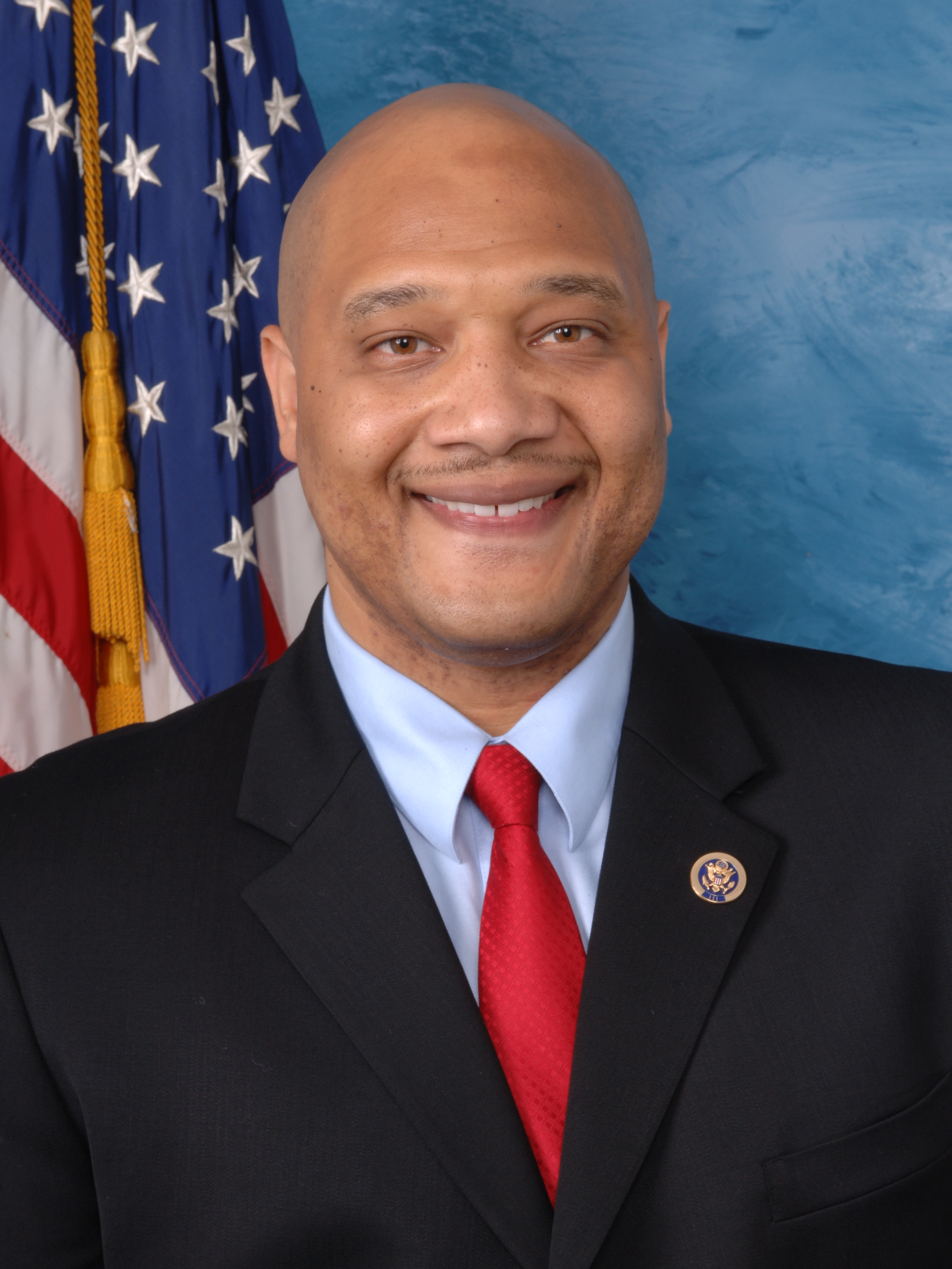

| Nominee | André Carson | Carlos May |
| Party | Democratic | Republican |
| Popular vote | 162,122 | 95,828 |
| Percentage | 62.9% | 37.1% |
- County results Carson: 60–70%
U.S. Representative before election
André Carson
Democratic
Elected U.S. Representative
André Carson
Democratic

The 7th district lost Democratic-leaning areas in northern Marion County in redistricting, while acquiring more Republican areas in the south of the county. Nonetheless, the district was expected to remain favorable to Democrats.

=== Democratic primary ===
==== Candidates ====
===== Nominee =====
- André Carson, incumbent U.S. Representative

===== Eliminated in primary =====
- Bob Kern, paralegal
- Pierre Pullins, warehouse worker
- Woodrow Wilcox

==== Primary results ====
Democratic primary results
| Party | Candidate | Votes | % |
|---|---|---|---|
| Democratic | André Carson (incumbent) | 34,782 | 90.3 |
| Democratic | Bob "Citizen" Kern | 2,048 | 5.3 |
| Democratic | Woodrow Wilcox | 1,082 | 2.8 |
| Democratic | Pierre Quincy Pullins | 586 | 1.5 |
| Total votes | | 38,498 | 100.0 |

=== Republican primary ===
==== Candidates ====
===== Nominee =====
- Carlos May, former aide for Indianapolis Mayor Greg Ballard

===== Eliminated in primary =====
- Steve Davis, former Southport police chief
- Tony Duncan, Army veteran and union worker
- Wayne Harmon, parole agent and former Marine
- J.D. Miniear, Christian ministry outreach
- Catherine Ping, Army Reserve lieutenant colonel and business owner
- Larry Shouse

==== Primary results ====
Republican primary results
| Party | Candidate | Votes | % |
|---|---|---|---|
| Republican | Carlos A. May | 10,783 | 26.8 |
| Republican | Catherine Ping | 9,771 | 24.3 |
| Republican | Steven Davis | 7,727 | 19.1 |
| Republican | Wayne E. Harmon | 4,252 | 10.6 |
| Republican | Anthony W. Duncan | 4,079 | 10.1 |
| Republican | JD Miniear | 2,227 | 5.5 |
| Republican | Lawrence B. Shouse | 1,412 | 3.5 |
| Total votes | | 40,251 | 100.0 |

=== General election ===
==== Predictions ====
| Source | Ranking | As of |
|---|---|---|
| The Cook Political Report | Safe D | November 5, 2012 |
| Rothenberg | Safe D | November 2, 2012 |
| Roll Call | Safe D | November 4, 2012 |
| Sabato's Crystal Ball | Safe D | November 5, 2012 |
| NY Times | Safe D | November 4, 2012 |
| RCP | Safe D | November 4, 2012 |
| The Hill | Safe D | November 4, 2012 |

==== Results ====
Indiana's 7th congressional district, 2012
| Party | Candidate | Votes | % |
|---|---|---|---|
| Democratic | André Carson (incumbent) | 162,122 | 62.9 |
| Republican | Carlos May | 95,828 | 37.1 |
| Total votes | | 257,950 | 100.0 |
| Democratic hold | | | |

== District 8 ==
2012 Indiana's 8th congressional district election
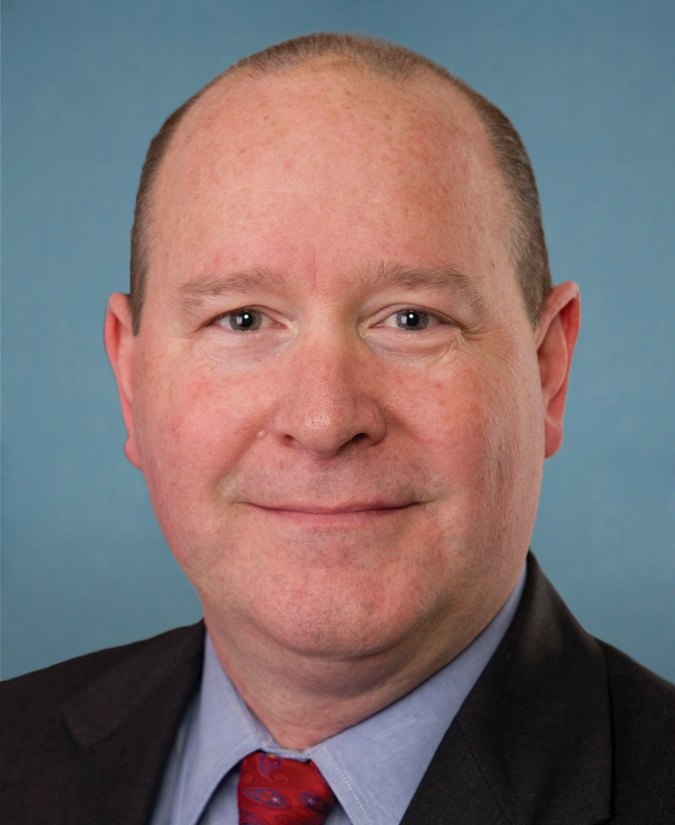

| Nominee | Larry Bucshon | Dave Crooks |
| Party | Republican | Democratic |
| Popular vote | 151,533 | 122,325 |
| Percentage | 53.3% | 43.1% |
- County results Crooks: 40–50% 50–60% Bucshon: 40–50% 50–60%
U.S. Representative before election
Larry Bucshon
Republican
Elected U.S. Representative
Larry Bucshon
Republican

The 8th district was made slightly more favorable to Democrats in redistricting, as a result of the removal of Fountain County, Putnam County and Warren County, all of which favor Republicans, and the addition of Dubois County, Perry County, Spencer County and part of Crawford County, all of which strongly favor neither party. Republican incumbent Larry Bucshon ran for re-election.

=== Republican primary ===
==== Candidates ====
===== Nominee =====
- Larry Bucshon, incumbent U.S. Representative

===== Eliminated in primary =====
- Kristi Risk, stay-at-home mom

==== Primary results ====
Republican primary results
| Party | Candidate | Votes | % |
|---|---|---|---|
| Republican | Larry D. Bucshon (incumbent) | 34,511 | 58.0 |
| Republican | Kristi Risk | 24,960 | 42.0 |
| Total votes | | 59,471 | 100.0 |

=== Democratic primary ===
The 8th district's Democratic candidates agreed to participate in a caucus in which the chairs and vice chairs of 38 counties would vote to decide the party's nominee; after which the candidates not selected would support the winner. Former state representative Dave Crooks was endorsed as the Democratic nominee by party leaders on December 10, 2011.

==== Candidates ====
===== Nominee =====
- Dave Crooks, former state representative

===== Eliminated in primary =====
- Thomas Barnett
- William Bryk, attorney and perennial candidate

===== Withdrawn =====
- Patrick Scates, former aide to former U.S. Representative Brad Ellsworth
- Terry White, chair of the Warrick County Democratic Party

===== Declined =====
- Brad Ellsworth, former U.S. Representative and nominee for Senate in 2010
- Trent Van Haaften, former state representative and nominee for this seat in 2010

==== Primary results ====
Democratic primary results
| Party | Candidate | Votes | % |
|---|---|---|---|
| Democratic | Dave Crooks | 18,634 | 57.7 |
| Democratic | Thomas Barnett | 10,638 | 32.9 |
| Democratic | William Bryk | 3,023 | 9.4 |
| Total votes | | 32,295 | 100.0 |

=== Libertarian primary ===
==== Candidates ====
===== Nominee =====
- Bart Gadau

=== General election ===
==== Endorsements ====
Dave Crooks (D)

Organizations

- Blue Dog Coalition
- Democratic Congressional Campaign Committee "Red to Blue" Program

==== Predictions ====
| Source | Ranking | As of |
|---|---|---|
| The Cook Political Report | Lean R | November 5, 2012 |
| Rothenberg | Likely R | November 2, 2012 |
| Roll Call | Safe R | November 4, 2012 |
| Sabato's Crystal Ball | Lean R | November 5, 2012 |
| NY Times | Lean R | November 4, 2012 |
| RCP | Likely R | November 4, 2012 |
| The Hill | Lean R | November 4, 2012 |

==== Results ====
Indiana's 8th congressional district, 2012
| Party | Candidate | Votes | % |
|---|---|---|---|
| Republican | Larry Bucshon (incumbent) | 151,533 | 53.3 |
| Democratic | Dave Crooks | 122,325 | 43.1 |
| Libertarian | Bart Gadau | 10,134 | 3.6 |
| Total votes | | 283,992 | 100.0 |
| Republican hold | | | |

== District 9 ==
2012 Indiana's 9th congressional district election
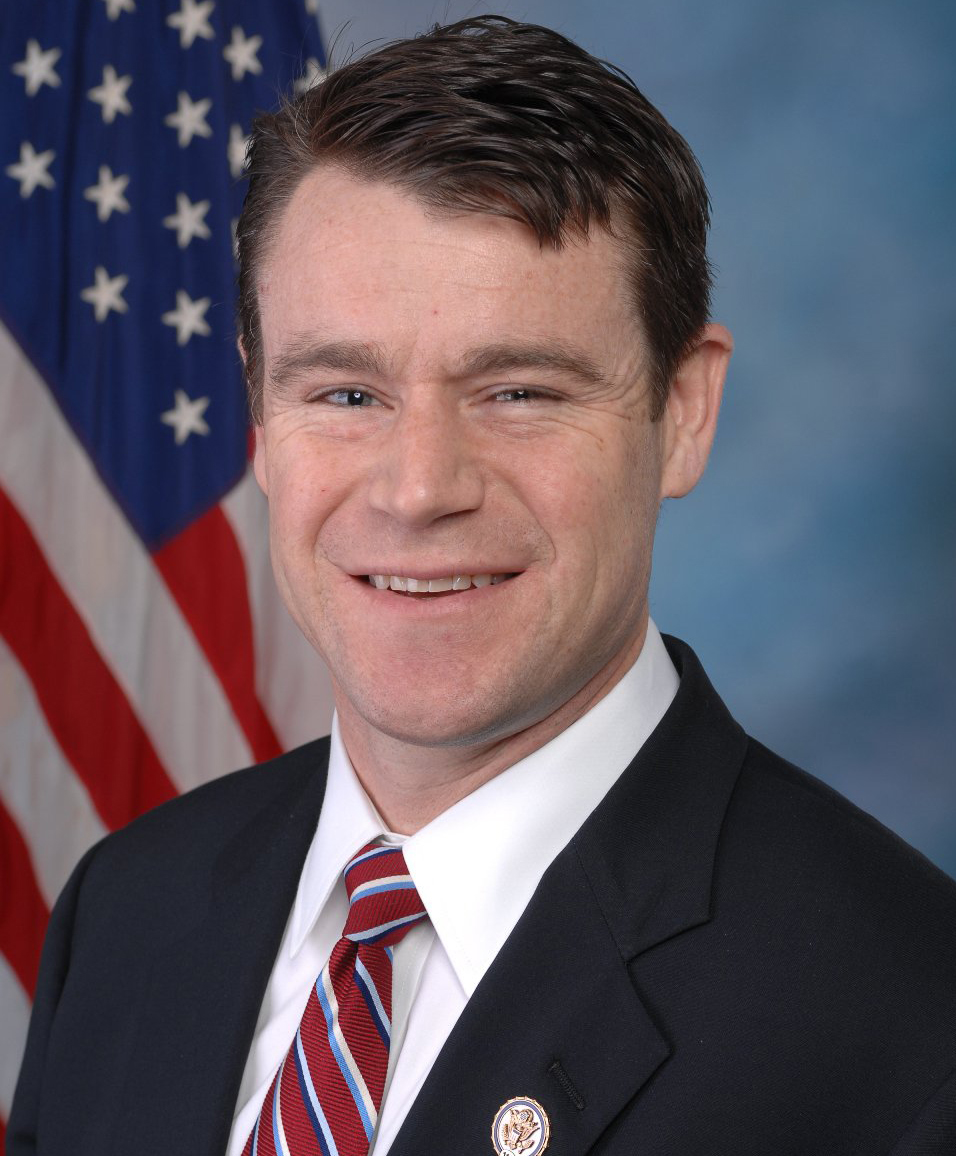

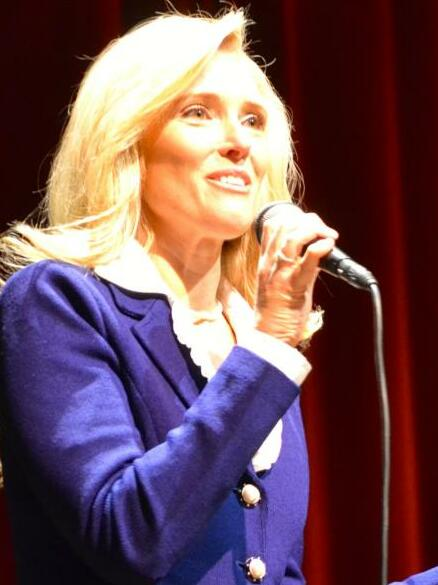
| Nominee | Todd Young | Shelli Yoder |
| Party | Republican | Democratic |
| Popular vote | 165,332 | 132,848 |
| Percentage | 55.4% | 44.6% |
- County results Young: 50–60% 60–70% 70–80% Yoder: 50–60%
U.S. Representative before election
Todd Young
Republican
Elected U.S. Representative
Todd Young
Republican

The 9th district previously consisted mostly of rural areas in southeastern Indiana but was made more favorable to Republicans when the legislature extended it northwards to include Johnson County and Morgan County while also incorporating suburbs of Louisville, Kentucky. Republican incumbent Todd Young ran for re-election.

=== Republican primary ===
==== Candidates ====
===== Nominee =====
- Todd Young, incumbent U.S. Representative

==== Primary results ====
Republican primary results
| Party | Candidate | Votes | % |
|---|---|---|---|
| Republican | Todd Young (incumbent) | 59,327 | 100.0 |
| Total votes | | 59,327 | 100.0 |

=== Democratic primary ===
==== Candidates ====
===== Nominee =====
- Shelli Yoder, professional development director at Indiana University in Bloomington Kelley School of Business and former Miss Indiana

===== Eliminated in primary =====
- Jonathan D. George, former Air Force officer who served on the United States National Security Council
- John Griffin Miller, activist
- John Tilford, military veteran and activist for veterans
- Robert Winningham, former employee of U.S. Representative Lee Hamilton

===== Declined =====
- Sam Locke, Air Force veteran and candidate for State Auditor in 2010
- Peggy Welch, state representative

==== Primary results ====
Democratic primary results
| Party | Candidate | Votes | % |
|---|---|---|---|
| Democratic | Shelli Yoder | 13,186 | 47.7 |
| Democratic | Robert Winningham | 5,590 | 20.2 |
| Democratic | Jonathan George | 4,591 | 16.6 |
| Democratic | John W. Tilford | 2,233 | 8.1 |
| Democratic | John Griffin Miller | 2,062 | 7.4 |
| Total votes | | 27,662 | 100.0 |

=== General election ===
Jason Sharp was nominated by the Libertarian Party but later dropped out.

==== Predictions ====
| Source | Ranking | As of |
|---|---|---|
| The Cook Political Report | Safe R | November 5, 2012 |
| Rothenberg | Safe R | November 2, 2012 |
| Roll Call | Safe R | November 4, 2012 |
| Sabato's Crystal Ball | Safe R | November 5, 2012 |
| NY Times | Safe R | November 4, 2012 |
| RCP | Safe R | November 4, 2012 |
| The Hill | Safe R | November 4, 2012 |

==== Results ====
Indiana's 9th congressional district, 2012
| Party | Candidate | Votes | % |
|---|---|---|---|
| Republican | Todd Young (incumbent) | 165,332 | 55.4 |
| Democratic | Shelli Yoder | 132,848 | 44.6 |
| Total votes | | 298,180 | 100.0 |
| Republican hold | | | |
