= 2018 Indiana House of Representatives election =

Election to the Indiana House of Representatives

- November 6, 2018

All 100 seats in the Indiana House of Representatives 51 seats needed for a majority
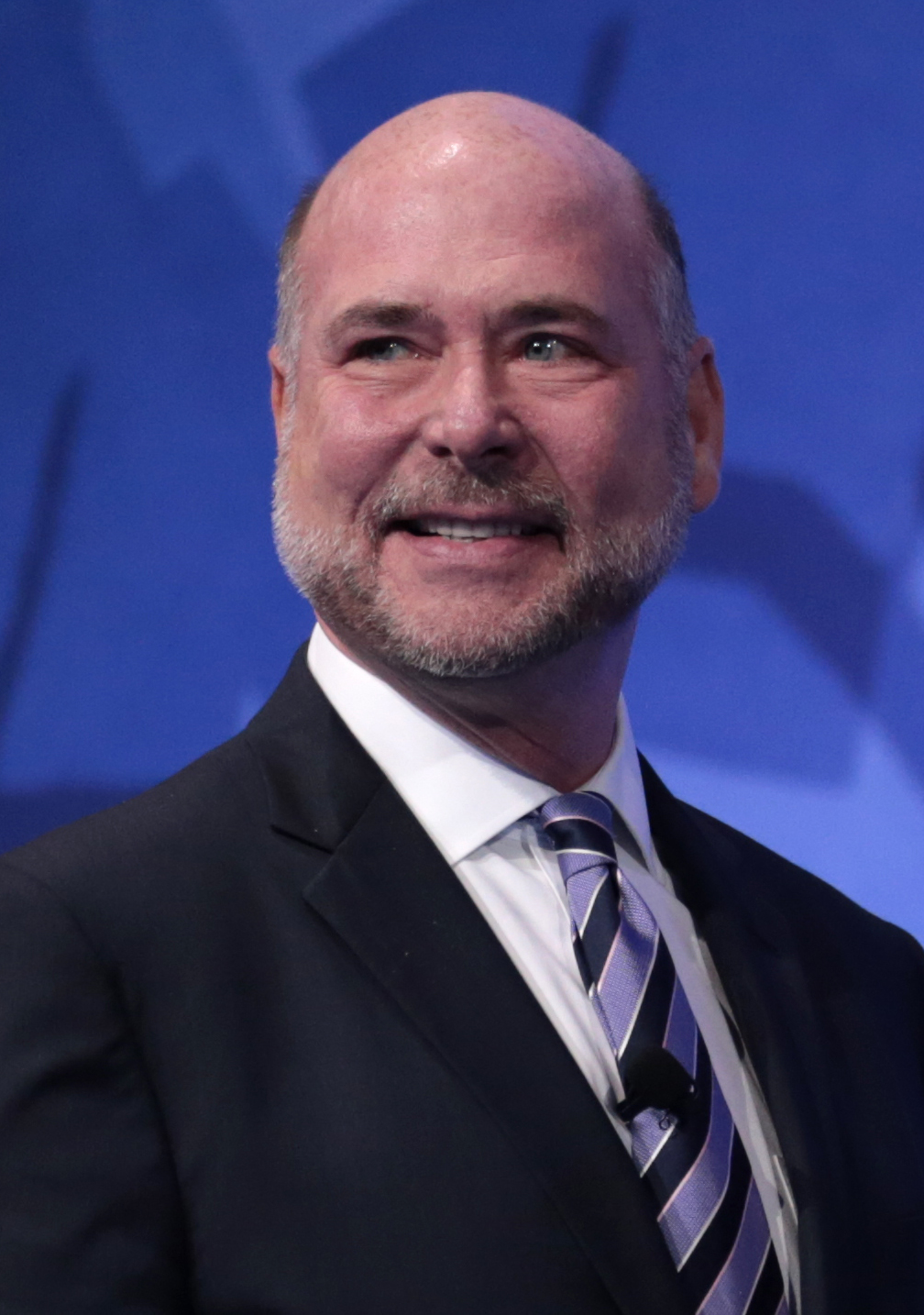
	Majority party	Minority party
Leader	Brian Bosma	Terry Goodin
Party	Republican	Democratic
Leader's seat	88th district	66th district
Last election	70	30
Seats won	67	33
Seat change	▼3	▲3
Popular vote	1,153,439	944,637
Percentage	54.70%	44.80%
Speaker before election
Brian Bosma
Republican
Elected Speaker
Brian Bosma
Republican

The 2018 Indiana House of Representatives election was held on November 6, 2018, to elect all 100 members of the Indiana House of Representatives. Primary elections were held on May 8. The Republican Party retained control of the chamber, winning 67 seats, while the Democratic Party won 33. Democrats gained three seats, reducing the Republican majority from the 70–30 division following the 2016 election.

The Democratic gains came in Districts 15, 19 and 26, where Chris Chyung, Lisa Beck and Chris Campbell, respectively, defeated Republican incumbents. Republicans nevertheless retained the two-thirds supermajority necessary to conduct legislative business without members of the minority party present.

== Background ==
Republicans entered the election holding 70 of the House's 100 seats, with Democrats holding the other 30. The Republican Party had controlled the chamber since the 2010 elections and also held the Indiana Senate and the governorship at the time of the 2018 elections.

All members of the House were up for election to two-year terms. The May 8 primary elections preceded the November 6 general election; the major-party candidate filing deadline was February 9. Twelve incumbents did not seek re-election.

== Campaign and election ==
Of the 100 general-election races, 31 were uncontested and 11 were decided by fewer than ten percentage points. One Republican incumbent was defeated in a primary, and three were defeated in the general election.

Three Republican incumbents lost their seats in the general election. In District 15, Chris Chyung defeated Hal Slager; in District 19, Lisa Beck defeated Julie Olthoff; and in District 26, Chris Campbell defeated Sally Siegrist. All three seats changed from Republican to Democratic control.

Campbell's campaign in District 26 emphasized public education funding. In a post-election interview with WBAA, she also identified wages and the opioid epidemic among her priorities.

=== Vote-counting delays in Porter County ===
The reporting of several legislative races was delayed by election administration problems in Porter County. Local officials did not begin counting ballots until the morning after election day, and results remained outstanding on November 8. The delayed totals affected House Districts 4 and 19 and Senate District 7. Porter County commissioners asked federal authorities to investigate allegations of election-law violations.

== Results ==
Republicans won 67 seats and Democrats won 33, a net Democratic gain of three. Thirty-one districts had only one candidate on the general-election ballot: 21 were won by Democrats and 10 by Republicans. The statewide vote totals below are the sums of votes cast for House candidates in the 100 individual districts, rather than the number of distinct voters statewide.

Party	Candidates	Votes	Vote share	Seats before	Seats won	Change
Republican	78	1,153,439	54.70%	70	67	−3
Democratic	89	944,637	44.80%	30	33	+3
Libertarian	8	10,132	0.48%	0	0	0
Independent	1	528	0.03%	0	0	0
Total	176	2,108,736	100%	100	100	—

=== Closest races ===
Eleven races were decided by margins of less than 10 percentage points. The table shows the winner's margin over the runner-up, expressed as a percentage of all votes cast in that district.

District	Winning candidate	Party	Margin (votes)	Margin (%)
15	Chris Chyung	Democratic	82	0.33
19	Lisa Beck	Democratic	251	0.96
89	Cindy Kirchhofer	Republican	218	1.05
35	Melanie M. Wright	Democratic	334	1.32
5	Dale DeVon	Republican	473	2.06
7	Joe Taylor	Democratic	727	3.33
4	Ed Soliday	Republican	1,929	6.98
81	Martin Carbaugh	Republican	1,435	7.33
37	Todd Huston	Republican	2,772	8.93
66	Terry Goodin	Democratic	2,091	9.19
76	Wendy McNamara	Republican	2,183	9.72

=== Seats changing parties ===
The following three Republican-held districts elected Democrats.

District	Republican incumbent	Democratic winner	Winner's vote	Incumbent's vote
15	Hal Slager	Chris Chyung	12,468	12,386
19	Julie Olthoff	Lisa Beck	13,249	12,998
26	Sally Siegrist	Chris Campbell	10,078	7,701

=== Results by district ===
The following tables list the candidates and votes recorded in each of the 100 districts. Vote shares are calculated from the candidate totals in each district; figures may not add to 100.0% because of rounding. The results are compiled from county-level election returns, with the Indiana Election Division's archived general-election results also available online.

The winning candidate in each district is shown in bold.

=== District 1 ===
Party	Candidate	Votes	%
Democratic	**Carolyn B. Jackson**	11,731	86.2
Libertarian	Donna Dunn	1,882	13.8
Total votes		13,613	100.0

=== District 2 ===
Party	Candidate	Votes	%
Democratic	**Earl Harris Jr.**	14,841	100.0
Total votes		14,841	100.0

=== District 3 ===
Party	Candidate	Votes	%
Democratic	**Ragen Hatcher**	15,339	100.0
Total votes		15,339	100.0

=== District 4 ===
Republican incumbent Ed Soliday defeated Democrat Frank Szczepanski. The reporting of results in this district was delayed by the Porter County election administration problems.

Party	Candidate	Votes	%
Republican	**Ed Soliday**	14,791	53.5
Democratic	Frank Szczepanski	12,862	46.5
Total votes		27,653	100.0

=== District 5 ===
Party	Candidate	Votes	%
Republican	**Dale DeVon**	11,713	51.0
Democratic	Donald R. Westerhausen Jr.	11,240	49.0
Total votes		22,953	100.0

=== District 6 ===
Party	Candidate	Votes	%
Democratic	**B. Patrick Bauer**	14,652	100.0
Total votes		14,652	100.0

=== District 7 ===
Party	Candidate	Votes	%
Democratic	**Joe Taylor**	11,267	51.7
Republican	Troy E. Dillon	10,540	48.3
Total votes		21,807	100.0

=== District 8 ===
Party	Candidate	Votes	%
Democratic	**Ryan M. Dvorak**	16,141	100.0
Total votes		16,141	100.0

=== District 9 ===
Party	Candidate	Votes	%
Democratic	**Patricia A. Boy**	13,088	60.2
Republican	Dan Granquist	8,645	39.8
Total votes		21,733	100.0

=== District 10 ===
Party	Candidate	Votes	%
Democratic	**Chuck Moseley**	15,126	100.0
Total votes		15,126	100.0

=== District 11 ===
Party	Candidate	Votes	%
Republican	**Mike Aylesworth**	16,445	65.3
Democratic	Delano Scaife	8,739	34.7
Total votes		25,184	100.0

=== District 12 ===
Party	Candidate	Votes	%
Democratic	**Mara Candelaria Reardon**	16,935	100.0
Total votes		16,935	100.0

=== District 13 ===
Party	Candidate	Votes	%
Republican	**Sharon Negele**	15,270	70.2
Democratic	Loretta Barnes	6,494	29.8
Total votes		21,764	100.0

=== District 14 ===
Party	Candidate	Votes	%
Democratic	**Vernon G. Smith**	16,642	100.0
Total votes		16,642	100.0

=== District 15 ===
Democrat Chris Chyung defeated Republican incumbent Hal Slager by 82 votes, taking the district for the Democratic Party.

Party	Candidate	Votes	%
Democratic	**Chris Chyung**	12,468	50.2
Republican	Hal Slager	12,386	49.8
Total votes		24,854	100.0

=== District 16 ===
Party	Candidate	Votes	%
Republican	**Doug Gutwein**	14,661	70.2
Democratic	Christina L. Zacny	6,209	29.8
Total votes		20,870	100.0

=== District 17 ===
Party	Candidate	Votes	%
Republican	**Jack Jordan**	13,664	67.3
Democratic	Michelle Livinghouse	6,631	32.7
Total votes		20,295	100.0

=== District 18 ===
Party	Candidate	Votes	%
Republican	**David A. Wolkins**	16,942	76.1
Democratic	Dee M Moore	5,323	23.9
Total votes		22,265	100.0

=== District 19 ===
Democrat Lisa Beck defeated Republican incumbent Julie Olthoff by 251 votes.

Party	Candidate	Votes	%
Democratic	**Lisa Beck**	13,249	50.5
Republican	Julie Olthoff	12,998	49.5
Total votes		26,247	100.0

=== District 20 ===
Party	Candidate	Votes	%
Republican	**Jim Pressel**	13,631	61.3
Democratic	Karen Salzer	8,590	38.7
Total votes		22,221	100.0

=== District 21 ===
Party	Candidate	Votes	%
Republican	**Tim Wesco**	10,996	62.4
Democratic	Carl Rust	5,988	34.0
Libertarian	Ethan Legg	632	3.6
Total votes		17,616	100.0

=== District 22 ===
Party	Candidate	Votes	%
Republican	**Curt Nisly**	17,300	100.0
Total votes		17,300	100.0

=== District 23 ===
Party	Candidate	Votes	%
Republican	**Ethan Manning**	11,588	64.6
Democratic	Terry Doran	5,707	31.8
Libertarian	Adam Werner	653	3.6
Total votes		17,948	100.0

=== District 24 ===
Party	Candidate	Votes	%
Republican	**Donna Schaibley**	20,618	55.6
Democratic	Naomi S. Bechtold	15,428	41.6
Libertarian	Donald G. Rainwater II	1,026	2.8
Total votes		37,072	100.0

=== District 25 ===
Party	Candidate	Votes	%
Republican	**Donald J. Lehe**	16,668	70.8
Democratic	Maurice Oakel Fuller	6,872	29.2
Total votes		23,540	100.0

=== District 26 ===
Democrat Chris Campbell defeated Republican incumbent Sally Siegrist. Campbell received 10,078 votes, compared with 7,701 for Siegrist.

Party	Candidate	Votes	%
Democratic	**Chris Campbell**	10,078	56.7
Republican	Sally Siegrist	7,701	43.3
Total votes		17,779	100.0

=== District 27 ===
Party	Candidate	Votes	%
Democratic	**Sheila Klinker**	12,238	100.0
Total votes		12,238	100.0

=== District 28 ===
Party	Candidate	Votes	%
Republican	**Jeff Thompson**	19,757	70.0
Democratic	Harlan Vondersaar	8,484	30.0
Total votes		28,241	100.0

=== District 29 ===
Party	Candidate	Votes	%
Republican	**Chuck Goodrich**	19,251	64.8
Democratic	Tracy M. Roberts	10,475	35.2
Total votes		29,726	100.0

=== District 30 ===
Party	Candidate	Votes	%
Republican	**Mike Karickhoff**	14,711	100.0
Total votes		14,711	100.0

=== District 31 ===
Party	Candidate	Votes	%
Republican	**Kevin A. Mahan**	12,358	66.4
Democratic	Lynn Johnson	6,250	33.6
Total votes		18,608	100.0

=== District 32 ===
Party	Candidate	Votes	%
Republican	**Tony Cook**	18,296	71.6
Democratic	Amie Neiling	7,269	28.4
Total votes		25,565	100.0

=== District 33 ===
Party	Candidate	Votes	%
Republican	**J. D. Prescott**	12,966	61.3
Democratic	Shon Byrum	7,161	33.8
Libertarian	Dale Arnett	1,034	4.9
Total votes		21,161	100.0

=== District 34 ===
Party	Candidate	Votes	%
Democratic	**Sue Errington**	11,553	100.0
Total votes		11,553	100.0

=== District 35 ===
Party	Candidate	Votes	%
Democratic	**Melanie M. Wright**	12,799	50.7
Republican	Ben W. Fisher	12,465	49.3
Total votes		25,264	100.0

=== District 36 ===
Party	Candidate	Votes	%
Democratic	**Terri Austin**	11,446	55.4
Republican	Jennifer Culp	9,211	44.6
Total votes		20,657	100.0

=== District 37 ===
Party	Candidate	Votes	%
Republican	**Todd Huston**	16,913	54.5
Democratic	Aimee Rivera Cole	14,141	45.5
Total votes		31,054	100.0

=== District 38 ===
Party	Candidate	Votes	%
Republican	**Heath R. Vannatter**	15,479	70.3
Democratic	Thomas (Tom) Hedde	6,538	29.7
Total votes		22,017	100.0

=== District 39 ===
Party	Candidate	Votes	%
Republican	**Jerry Torr**	18,861	57.0
Democratic	Mark C. Hinton	14,207	43.0
Total votes		33,068	100.0

=== District 40 ===
Party	Candidate	Votes	%
Republican	**Gregory E Steuerwald**	16,501	57.7
Democratic	Mechelle Callen	12,121	42.3
Total votes		28,622	100.0

=== District 41 ===
Party	Candidate	Votes	%
Republican	**Tim Brown**	16,164	73.2
Democratic	Brock Ervin	5,909	26.8
Total votes		22,073	100.0

=== District 42 ===
Party	Candidate	Votes	%
Republican	**Alan Morrison**	13,073	60.4
Democratic	Evelyn Brown	8,570	39.6
Total votes		21,643	100.0

=== District 43 ===
Party	Candidate	Votes	%
Democratic	**Tonya Pfaff**	10,110	59.2
Republican	Eddie Felling	6,978	40.8
Total votes		17,088	100.0

=== District 44 ===
Party	Candidate	Votes	%
Republican	**Beau Baird**	14,776	68.8
Democratic	Kimberly Anne Fidler	6,690	31.2
Total votes		21,466	100.0

=== District 45 ===
Party	Candidate	Votes	%
Republican	**Bruce Borders**	13,726	65.0
Democratic	Jim Exline	7,377	35.0
Total votes		21,103	100.0

=== District 46 ===
Party	Candidate	Votes	%
Republican	**Bob Heaton**	14,491	64.3
Democratic	E. Thomasina Marsili	8,050	35.7
Total votes		22,541	100.0

=== District 47 ===
Party	Candidate	Votes	%
Republican	**John T. Young**	17,419	71.1
Democratic	Susan Clare Diagana	7,080	28.9
Total votes		24,499	100.0

=== District 48 ===
Party	Candidate	Votes	%
Republican	**Doug Miller**	12,370	76.5
Libertarian	Robert Wilson Jr.	3,798	23.5
Total votes		16,168	100.0

=== District 49 ===
Party	Candidate	Votes	%
Republican	**Christy Stutzman**	13,633	100.0
Total votes		13,633	100.0

=== District 50 ===
Party	Candidate	Votes	%
Republican	**Dan Leonard**	16,096	71.4
Democratic	Jorge Fernandez	6,439	28.6
Total votes		22,535	100.0

=== District 51 ===
Party	Candidate	Votes	%
Republican	**Dennis J. Zent**	12,907	75.1
Democratic	Michael M. Stephenson	4,285	24.9
Total votes		17,192	100.0

=== District 52 ===
Party	Candidate	Votes	%
Republican	**Ben Smaltz**	17,871	73.3
Democratic	Martha Lemert	6,500	26.7
Total votes		24,371	100.0

=== District 53 ===
Party	Candidate	Votes	%
Republican	**Bob Cherry**	17,011	70.7
Democratic	Nancy Tibbett	7,034	29.3
Total votes		24,045	100.0

=== District 54 ===
Party	Candidate	Votes	%
Republican	**Tom Saunders**	17,179	100.0
Total votes		17,179	100.0

=== District 55 ===
Party	Candidate	Votes	%
Republican	**Cindy Meyer Ziemke**	15,474	72.2
Democratic	Corinne Westerfield	5,951	27.8
Total votes		21,425	100.0

=== District 56 ===
Independent candidate Jeremy Why received 528 votes in the district.

Party	Candidate	Votes	%
Republican	**Bradford J. Barrett**	11,926	65.0
Democratic	Jeffrey S. Locke	5,891	32.1
Independent	Jeremy Why	528	2.9
Total votes		18,345	100.0

=== District 57 ===
Party	Candidate	Votes	%
Republican	**Sean R. Eberhart**	18,085	100.0
Total votes		18,085	100.0

=== District 58 ===
Party	Candidate	Votes	%
Republican	**Woody Burton**	13,784	63.3
Democratic	Cindy Reinert	7,981	36.7
Total votes		21,765	100.0

=== District 59 ===
Party	Candidate	Votes	%
Republican	**Ryan Lauer**	12,519	56.8
Democratic	Dale Nowlin	8,930	40.6
Libertarian	Clyde D. Myers	573	2.6
Total votes		22,022	100.0

=== District 60 ===
Party	Candidate	Votes	%
Republican	**Peggy Mayfield**	15,384	59.0
Democratic	Penny Githens	10,708	41.0
Total votes		26,092	100.0

=== District 61 ===
Party	Candidate	Votes	%
Democratic	**Matt Pierce**	16,870	100.0
Total votes		16,870	100.0

=== District 62 ===
Party	Candidate	Votes	%
Republican	**Jeff Ellington**	13,571	56.9
Democratic	Amy Swain	10,264	43.1
Total votes		23,835	100.0

=== District 63 ===
Party	Candidate	Votes	%
Republican	**Shane M. Lindauer**	15,459	67.2
Democratic	Joe Lannan	7,557	32.8
Total votes		23,016	100.0

=== District 64 ===
Party	Candidate	Votes	%
Republican	**Matt Hostettler**	20,738	100.0
Total votes		20,738	100.0

=== District 65 ===
Party	Candidate	Votes	%
Republican	**Chris D. May**	17,398	69.3
Democratic	Jared Stancombe	7,724	30.7
Total votes		25,122	100.0

=== District 66 ===
Party	Candidate	Votes	%
Democratic	**Terry Goodin**	12,427	54.6
Republican	Mike Bowling	10,336	45.4
Total votes		22,763	100.0

=== District 67 ===
Party	Candidate	Votes	%
Republican	**Randy Frye**	16,294	77.6
Democratic	Cordelle Feuston	4,713	22.4
Total votes		21,007	100.0

=== District 68 ===
Party	Candidate	Votes	%
Republican	**Randy Lyness**	17,841	78.7
Democratic	Matt Gaustad	4,834	21.3
Total votes		22,675	100.0

=== District 69 ===
Party	Candidate	Votes	%
Republican	**Jim Lucas**	14,604	69.3
Democratic	Steve Schoettmer	6,480	30.7
Total votes		21,084	100.0

=== District 70 ===
Party	Candidate	Votes	%
Republican	**Karen Engleman**	18,120	65.4
Democratic	Sarah Stivers	9,574	34.6
Total votes		27,694	100.0

=== District 71 ===
Party	Candidate	Votes	%
Democratic	**Rita A. Fleming**	13,239	55.6
Republican	Matt Owen	10,031	42.1
Libertarian	Thomas Keister	534	2.2
Total votes		23,804	100.0

=== District 72 ===
Party	Candidate	Votes	%
Republican	**Ed Clere**	14,957	55.1
Democratic	Sam Charbonneau	12,178	44.9
Total votes		27,135	100.0

=== District 73 ===
Party	Candidate	Votes	%
Republican	**Steve Davisson**	17,824	100.0
Total votes		17,824	100.0

=== District 74 ===
Party	Candidate	Votes	%
Republican	**Stephen R. Bartels**	13,671	56.9
Democratic	Larry K. Kleeman	10,359	43.1
Total votes		24,030	100.0

=== District 75 ===
Party	Candidate	Votes	%
Republican	**Ron Bacon**	16,118	61.2
Democratic	John Hurley	10,236	38.8
Total votes		26,354	100.0

=== District 76 ===
Party	Candidate	Votes	%
Republican	**Wendy McNamara**	12,317	54.9
Democratic	Steve Folz	10,134	45.1
Total votes		22,451	100.0

=== District 77 ===
Party	Candidate	Votes	%
Democratic	**Ryan Hatfield**	12,662	100.0
Total votes		12,662	100.0

=== District 78 ===
Party	Candidate	Votes	%
Republican	**Holli Sullivan**	18,098	100.0
Total votes		18,098	100.0

=== District 79 ===
Party	Candidate	Votes	%
Republican	**Matthew Lehman**	18,984	100.0
Total votes		18,984	100.0

=== District 80 ===
Party	Candidate	Votes	%
Democratic	**Phil Giaquinta**	12,229	100.0
Total votes		12,229	100.0

=== District 81 ===
Party	Candidate	Votes	%
Republican	**Martin Carbaugh**	10,504	53.7
Democratic	Kyle R. Miller	9,069	46.3
Total votes		19,573	100.0

=== District 82 ===
Party	Candidate	Votes	%
Republican	**David H. Abbott**	14,764	74.6
Democratic	Mike Wilber	5,017	25.4
Total votes		19,781	100.0

=== District 83 ===
Party	Candidate	Votes	%
Republican	**Christopher N. Judy**	23,070	100.0
Total votes		23,070	100.0

=== District 84 ===
Party	Candidate	Votes	%
Republican	**Bob Morris**	16,771	62.6
Democratic	Curtis Nash	10,027	37.4
Total votes		26,798	100.0

=== District 85 ===
Party	Candidate	Votes	%
Republican	**Dave Heine**	15,871	70.6
Democratic	Christopher J. Rex	6,613	29.4
Total votes		22,484	100.0

=== District 86 ===
Party	Candidate	Votes	%
Democratic	**Ed DeLaney**	24,976	100.0
Total votes		24,976	100.0

=== District 87 ===
Party	Candidate	Votes	%
Democratic	**Carey Hamilton**	18,650	62.2
Republican	Paula L. Finch	11,338	37.8
Total votes		29,988	100.0

=== District 88 ===
Party	Candidate	Votes	%
Republican	**Brian C. Bosma**	18,825	55.5
Democratic	Poonam Gill	15,099	44.5
Total votes		33,924	100.0

=== District 89 ===
Republican incumbent Cindy Kirchhofer defeated Democrat John Barnes by 218 votes.

Party	Candidate	Votes	%
Republican	**Cindy Kirchhofer**	10,455	50.5
Democratic	John F. Barnes	10,237	49.5
Total votes		20,692	100.0

=== District 90 ===
Party	Candidate	Votes	%
Republican	**Mike Speedy**	15,699	60.3
Democratic	Tim Jeffers	10,345	39.7
Total votes		26,044	100.0

=== District 91 ===
Party	Candidate	Votes	%
Republican	**Robert W. Behning**	11,273	60.0
Democratic	Kevin Leineweber	7,516	40.0
Total votes		18,789	100.0

=== District 92 ===
Party	Candidate	Votes	%
Democratic	**Karlee Macer**	12,786	100.0
Total votes		12,786	100.0

=== District 93 ===
Party	Candidate	Votes	%
Republican	**David N. Frizzell**	14,316	62.4
Democratic	Greg Rathnow	8,635	37.6
Total votes		22,951	100.0

=== District 94 ===
Party	Candidate	Votes	%
Democratic	**Cherrish S. Pryor**	18,056	100.0
Total votes		18,056	100.0

=== District 95 ===
Party	Candidate	Votes	%
Democratic	**John L. Bartlett**	16,040	100.0
Total votes		16,040	100.0

=== District 96 ===
Party	Candidate	Votes	%
Democratic	**Gregory W. Porter**	24,261	100.0
Total votes		24,261	100.0

=== District 97 ===
Party	Candidate	Votes	%
Democratic	**Justin Moed**	8,635	100.0
Total votes		8,635	100.0

=== District 98 ===
Party	Candidate	Votes	%
Democratic	**Robin Shackleford**	13,699	100.0
Total votes		13,699	100.0

=== District 99 ===
Party	Candidate	Votes	%
Democratic	**Vanessa J. Summers**	15,599	100.0
Total votes		15,599	100.0

=== District 100 ===
Party	Candidate	Votes	%
Democratic	**Dan Forestal**	14,070	100.0
Total votes		14,070	100.0

== Aftermath ==
The results left Republicans with exactly 67 seats, preserving their House supermajority. Shortly after the election, House Democrats elected Phil GiaQuinta as their caucus leader in place of Terry Goodin. Republicans retained Brian Bosma as Speaker. At the General Assembly's organizational meeting on November 20, Bosma continued as Speaker and GiaQuinta became House minority leader.

== See also ==
- 2018 Indiana elections
- 2018 Indiana State Senate election
- 2018 United States state legislative elections
