= 2016 Indiana House of Representatives election =

Election for the 100 seats of the Indiana House of Representatives

- November 8, 2016

All 100 seats in the Indiana House of Representatives 51 seats needed for a majority
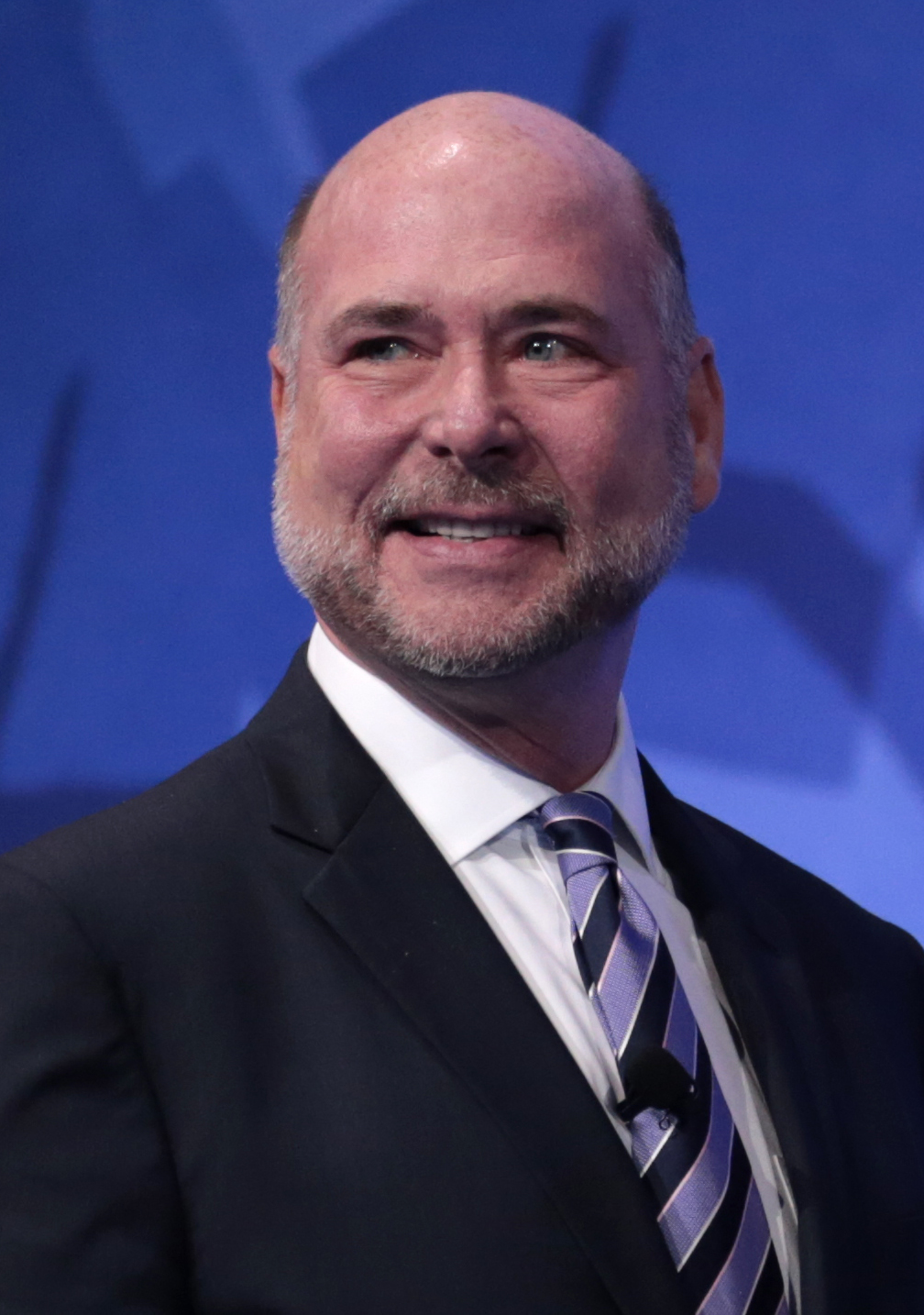
	Majority party	Minority party
Leader	Brian Bosma	Scott Pelath
Party	Republican	Democratic
Leader's seat	88th district	9th district
Last election	71	29
Seats won	70	30
Seat change	▼1	▲1
Popular vote	1,487,152	985,191
Percentage	59.02%	39.10%
Speaker before election
Brian Bosma
Republican
Elected Speaker
Brian Bosma
Republican

The 2016 Indiana House of Representatives election was held on November 8, 2016, to elect all 100 members of the Indiana House of Representatives. The Republican Party retained its majority, winning 70 seats to the Democratic Party's 30. Republicans had held 71 seats before the election, so the outcome represented a net gain of one seat for the Democrats. The Republican caucus remained large enough to hold a two-thirds supermajority.

The only district to change party control was District 12, where Democrat Mara Candelaria Reardon defeated Republican incumbent Bill Fine. The primary elections took place on May 3, and the general-election candidate filing deadline for major parties was February 5.

== Background ==
Republicans entered the 2016 elections with 71 of the chamber's 100 seats, compared with 29 seats for Democrats. Every House seat was up for election. Republicans also controlled the Indiana Senate and the governorship before the election.

Ten incumbents did not seek another House term. They included four Democrats, Donna Harris (District 2), David Niezgodski (District 7), Gail Riecken (District 77) and Christina Hale (District 87), and six Republicans, Timothy Harman (District 17), Tom Dermody (District 20), Randolph Truitt (District 26), John Price (District 47), Eric Koch (District 65) and Rhonda Rhoads (District 70). Hale withdrew her House re-election bid after the primary to run for lieutenant governor.

== Nominations and campaign ==
Major-party primaries were held on May 3. Twelve incumbents, 11 Republicans and one Democrat, faced primary challengers. Republican representative Casey Cox lost the District 85 primary to Dave Heine, who subsequently won the general election.

Ballotpedia identified the Republican primaries in Districts 24, 59 and 65 as noteworthy contests. In District 24, incumbent Donna Schaibley defeated Greg Fettig; in District 59, incumbent Milo Smith defeated Ryan Lauer and Lew Wilson. The District 65 Republican primary had six candidates seeking to succeed outgoing representative Eric Koch, and Christopher May won the nomination.

The general election featured more than one candidate in 73 districts. The other 27 general-election races had only one candidate listed in the compiled returns. Of the 73 contested races, ten were decided by less than ten percentage points.

== Results ==
The Republicans won 70 seats and the Democrats won 30. District 12 was the only party change. House Republicans therefore retained a supermajority, although their margin declined by one seat.

The vote totals in the following statewide table are sums of district-level candidate votes, not a statewide two-party vote or a count of distinct voters. For districts with multiple general-election candidates, the figures use the published Ballotpedia district results; for the 27 districts with only one general-election candidate and no vote total on Ballotpedia's candidate list, they use county-level returns distributed by OpenElections. The 2014 comparison is calculated from OpenElections' county-level returns. The totals should therefore be treated as compiled figures from two reporting datasets, rather than an independently published official statewide total.

=== Statewide summary ===
Party results for all 100 House districts
Party	Candidates	Votes	Vote share	Change in vote share vs. 2014 (pp)	Seats before	Seats won	Seat change
Republican	84	1,487,152	59.02%	▼3.9	71	70	▼1
Democratic	82	985,191	39.10%	▲3.3	29	30	▲1
Libertarian	14	37,043	1.47%	▲0.2	0	0	—
Independent	3	10,512	0.42%	▲0.3	0	0	—
Total	183	2,519,898	100.00%	—	100	100	—

The vote-share changes shown above are arithmetic differences between the 2016 and 2014 statewide sums. They are not a uniform-electorate swing measure: candidates ran without major-party opposition in different districts in the two elections, and the figures use different reporting datasets.

=== Seats changing parties ===
The only House district to switch parties was District 12.

District	Previously held by	Democratic winner	Republican incumbent	Democratic votes	Republican votes	Result
12	Republican	Mara Candelaria Reardon	Bill Fine	15,979	13,246	▲ Democratic gain

=== Closest contests ===
Ten House elections were decided by fewer than ten percentage points. The margin is the difference between the winner and runner-up, divided by the total votes recorded for the district; it is not a two-party swing.

District	Winner	Party	Runner-up	Margin (votes)	Margin (pp)
19	Julie Olthoff	Republican	Shelli VanDenburgh	341	1.09
7	Joe Taylor III	Democratic	Justin Chupp	531	2.10
87	Carey Hamilton	Democratic	Connie Eckert	1,503	4.49
35	Melanie Wright	Democratic	Bill Walters	1,514	5.09
26	Sally Siegrist	Republican	Victoria Woeste	1,087	5.16
15	Hal Slager	Republican	Tom O'Donnell	2,571	8.65
8	Ryan Dvorak	Democratic	Richard Pfeil	2,374	8.75
89	Cindy Kirchhofer	Republican	Rachel Burke	2,316	9.25
12	Mara Candelaria Reardon	Democratic	Bill Fine	2,733	9.35
4	Ed Soliday	Republican	Pamela Fish	2,961	9.38

=== District overview ===
The following table lists the winning candidate in each district. A gain indicates a change in the winning party since the 2014 House election; a hold indicates that the same party retained the district. A two-party swing is shown only where both the Republican and Democratic candidates received votes in both 2014 and 2016. The party letter identifies the party toward which the two-party vote share moved, with the numerical change in percentage points. Where the comparison is unavailable, a dash is shown.

District	Winning candidate	Party	Winner's share	Two-party swing vs. 2014 (pp)	Seat status
1	Linda Lawson	Democratic	87.4%	—	Democratic hold
2	Earl Harris Jr.	Democratic	100.0%	—	Democratic hold
3	Charlie Brown	Democratic	100.0%	—	Democratic hold
4	Ed Soliday	Republican	54.7%	D +0.8	Republican hold
5	Dale DeVon	Republican	100.0%	—	Republican hold
6	B. Patrick Bauer	Democratic	100.0%	—	Democratic hold
7	Joe Taylor III	Democratic	48.1%	—	Democratic hold
8	Ryan Dvorak	Democratic	54.4%	—	Democratic hold
9	Scott Pelath	Democratic	100.0%	—	Democratic hold
10	Charles Moseley	Democratic	100.0%	—	Democratic hold
11	Michael Aylesworth	Republican	60.5%	R +3.8	Republican hold
12	Mara Candelaria Reardon	Democratic	54.7%	D +6.2	Democratic gain from Republican
13	Sharon Negele	Republican	69.4%	—	Republican hold
14	Vernon Smith	Democratic	100.0%	—	Democratic hold
15	Hal Slager	Republican	54.3%	D +4.3	Republican hold
16	Douglas Gutwein	Republican	68.9%	R +4.4	Republican hold
17	Jack Jordan	Republican	67.2%	—	Republican hold
18	David Wolkins	Republican	76.1%	—	Republican hold
19	Julie Olthoff	Republican	48.5%	D +0.6	Republican hold
20	Jim Pressel	Republican	57.1%	—	Republican hold
21	Timothy Wesco	Republican	61.8%	D +1.9	Republican hold
22	Curt Nisly	Republican	77.4%	R +2.9	Republican hold
23	Bill Friend	Republican	70.4%	—	Republican hold
24	Donna Schaibley	Republican	82.0%	—	Republican hold
25	Donald Lehe	Republican	69.0%	R +2.4	Republican hold
26	Sally Siegrist	Republican	52.6%	—	Republican hold
27	Sheila Klinker	Democratic	100.0%	—	Democratic hold
28	Jeffrey Thompson	Republican	100.0%	—	Republican hold
29	Kathy Kreag Richardson	Republican	100.0%	—	Republican hold
30	Mike Karickhoff	Republican	60.3%	R +2.5	Republican hold
31	Kevin Mahan	Republican	65.8%	—	Republican hold
32	Tony Cook	Republican	74.9%	R +11.8	Republican hold
33	Greg Beumer	Republican	100.0%	—	Republican hold
34	Sue Errington	Democratic	65.7%	R +0.0	Democratic hold
35	Melanie Wright	Democratic	52.5%	D +1.9	Democratic hold
36	Terri Jo Austin	Democratic	58.7%	R +2.3	Democratic hold
37	Todd Huston	Republican	64.0%	—	Republican hold
38	Heath VanNatter	Republican	74.7%	—	Republican hold
39	Jerry Torr	Republican	65.1%	D +8.1	Republican hold
40	Gregory Steuerwald	Republican	100.0%	—	Republican hold
41	Tim Brown	Republican	69.1%	—	Republican hold
42	Alan Morrison	Republican	56.6%	R +0.4	Republican hold
43	Clyde Kersey	Democratic	100.0%	—	Democratic hold
44	Jim Baird	Republican	69.0%	—	Republican hold
45	Bruce Borders	Republican	100.0%	—	Republican hold
46	Bob Heaton	Republican	64.9%	R +2.6	Republican hold
47	John Young	Republican	73.4%	D +3.4	Republican hold
48	Doug Miller	Republican	66.4%	—	Republican hold
49	Wes Culver	Republican	100.0%	—	Republican hold
50	Dan Leonard	Republican	73.1%	—	Republican hold
51	Dennis Zent	Republican	100.0%	—	Republican hold
52	Ben Smaltz	Republican	75.0%	D +0.4	Republican hold
53	Robert Cherry	Republican	69.5%	—	Republican hold
54	Tom Saunders	Republican	72.9%	—	Republican hold
55	Cindy Ziemke	Republican	76.3%	R +5.5	Republican hold
56	Dick Hamm	Republican	61.3%	D +2.6	Republican hold
57	Sean Eberhart	Republican	100.0%	—	Republican hold
58	Charles Burton	Republican	66.6%	—	Republican hold
59	Milo Smith	Republican	61.2%	R +1.6	Republican hold
60	Peggy Mayfield	Republican	63.4%	D +0.4	Republican hold
61	Matt Pierce	Democratic	78.8%	—	Democratic hold
62	Jeff Ellington	Republican	59.1%	R +1.8	Republican hold
63	Mike Braun	Republican	71.8%	—	Republican hold
64	Thomas Washburne	Republican	100.0%	—	Republican hold
65	Christopher May	Republican	62.7%	—	Republican hold
66	Terry Goodin	Democratic	60.3%	D +1.3	Democratic hold
67	Randy Frye	Republican	77.1%	—	Republican hold
68	Randy Lyness	Republican	75.1%	R +5.2	Republican hold
69	Jim Lucas	Republican	100.0%	—	Republican hold
70	Karen Engleman	Republican	65.5%	R +6.7	Republican hold
71	Steven Stemler	Democratic	80.4%	—	Democratic hold
72	Ed Clere	Republican	57.2%	R +0.7	Republican hold
73	Steve Davisson	Republican	72.8%	R +2.6	Republican hold
74	Lloyd Arnold	Republican	59.7%	D +1.6	Republican hold
75	Ron Bacon	Republican	69.2%	R +2.6	Republican hold
76	Wendy McNamara	Republican	100.0%	—	Republican hold
77	Ryan Hatfield	Democratic	59.4%	R +2.5	Democratic hold
78	Holli Sullivan	Republican	66.4%	R +2.6	Republican hold
79	Matthew Lehman	Republican	100.0%	—	Republican hold
80	Phil GiaQuinta	Democratic	100.0%	—	Democratic hold
81	Martin Carbaugh	Republican	60.9%	R +1.4	Republican hold
82	David Ober	Republican	75.3%	D +1.7	Republican hold
83	Christopher N. Judy	Republican	100.0%	—	Republican hold
84	Bob Morris	Republican	66.1%	D +0.6	Republican hold
85	Dave Heine	Republican	73.3%	—	Republican hold
86	Edward DeLaney	Democratic	62.2%	—	Democratic hold
87	Carey Hamilton	Democratic	52.2%	D +0.7	Democratic hold
88	Brian Bosma	Republican	65.3%	—	Republican hold
89	Cindy Kirchhofer	Republican	54.6%	D +4.6	Republican hold
90	Mike Speedy	Republican	63.6%	—	Republican hold
91	Robert Behning	Republican	100.0%	—	Republican hold
92	Karlee Macer	Democratic	60.9%	D +8.2	Democratic hold
93	David Frizzell	Republican	67.4%	D +4.7	Republican hold
94	Cherrish Pryor	Democratic	100.0%	—	Democratic hold
95	John Bartlett	Democratic	87.2%	—	Democratic hold
96	Gregory Porter	Democratic	100.0%	—	Democratic hold
97	Justin Moed	Democratic	61.0%	—	Democratic hold
98	Robin Shackleford	Democratic	81.4%	—	Democratic hold
99	Vanessa Summers	Democratic	100.0%	—	Democratic hold
100	Dan Forestal	Democratic	67.2%	—	Democratic hold

== Results by district ==
General-election votes and candidates are drawn from the Ballotpedia district results except in uncontested districts, where vote totals come from the OpenElections county file. The change column is the difference between the candidate's party vote share in 2016 and that party's vote share in the same district in 2014. It measures the change in all-candidate vote share, not two-party swing; a dash means the party did not have a recorded candidate in that district in 2014. Percentage-point figures are rounded to one decimal place.

For districts that had a contested Democratic or Republican primary with published candidate vote counts, the corresponding primary results are listed ahead of the general-election table. Only these contested primaries are displayed; absence of a primary table does not mean that a primary was not held.

=== District 1 ===
District 1 general-election results, November 8, 2016
Party	Candidate	Votes	Vote share	Change vs. 2014 (pp)
Democratic	Linda Lawson	15,561	87.4%	▼12.6
Libertarian	Michael Sandridge	2,242	12.6%	—
Total votes		17,803	100.0%	—
Democratic hold

=== District 2 ===
Democratic representative Donna Harris did not run for re-election. Harris was president and producer of Motivation Media at the time of the election.

==== Democratic primary ====
Democratic primary, May 3, 2016
Candidate	Votes	Vote share
Earl Harris Jr.	3,882	34.5%
Rose Rodriguez	3,137	27.9%
Tammi Davis	3,056	27.2%
Drake Morris	1,177	10.5%
Total	11,252	100.0%

==== General election ====
District 2 general-election results, November 8, 2016
Party	Candidate	Votes	Vote share	Change vs. 2014 (pp)
Democratic	Earl Harris Jr.	19,091	100.0%	▲9.8
Total votes		19,091	100.0%	—
Democratic hold

=== District 3 ===
==== Democratic primary ====
Democratic primary, May 3, 2016
Candidate	Votes	Vote share
Charlie Brown	7,816	72.9%
Antuwan Clemons	2,899	27.1%
Total	10,715	100.0%

==== General election ====
District 3 general-election results, November 8, 2016
Party	Candidate	Votes	Vote share	Change vs. 2014 (pp)
Democratic	Charlie Brown	18,985	100.0%	0.0
Total votes		18,985	100.0%	—
Democratic hold

=== District 4 ===
==== Democratic primary ====
Democratic primary, May 3, 2016
Candidate	Votes	Vote share
Pamela Fish	4,247	52.5%
Jesse Harper	3,844	47.5%
Total	8,091	100.0%

==== General election ====
District 4 general-election results, November 8, 2016
Party	Candidate	Votes	Vote share	Change vs. 2014 (pp)
Republican	Ed Soliday	17,272	54.7%	▼0.8
Democratic	Pamela Fish	14,311	45.3%	▲0.8
Total votes		31,583	100.0%	—
Republican hold

=== District 5 ===
District 5 general-election results, November 8, 2016
Party	Candidate	Votes	Vote share	Change vs. 2014 (pp)
Republican	Dale DeVon	19,177	100.0%	0.0
Total votes		19,177	100.0%	—
Republican hold

=== District 6 ===
District 6 general-election results, November 8, 2016
Party	Candidate	Votes	Vote share	Change vs. 2014 (pp)
Democratic	B. Patrick Bauer	17,530	100.0%	0.0
Total votes		17,530	100.0%	—
Democratic hold

=== District 7 ===
Democratic representative David Niezgodski did not seek another House term. Democrat Joe Taylor III narrowly defeated Republican Justin Chupp in the open-seat race. Taylor was an assembler at AM General and a local United Auto Workers president.

District 7 general-election results, November 8, 2016
Party	Candidate	Votes	Vote share	Change vs. 2014 (pp)
Democratic	Joe Taylor III	12,165	48.1%	▼27.6
Republican	Justin Chupp	11,634	46.0%	—
Libertarian	James P. Gillen II	1,471	5.8%	▼18.4
Total votes		25,270	100.0%	—
Democratic hold

=== District 8 ===
District 8 general-election results, November 8, 2016
Party	Candidate	Votes	Vote share	Change vs. 2014 (pp)
Democratic	Ryan Dvorak	14,747	54.4%	▼45.6
Republican	Richard Pfeil	12,373	45.6%	—
Total votes		27,120	100.0%	—
Democratic hold

=== District 9 ===
District 9 general-election results, November 8, 2016
Party	Candidate	Votes	Vote share	Change vs. 2014 (pp)
Democratic	Scott Pelath	19,283	100.0%	0.0
Total votes		19,283	100.0%	—
Democratic hold

=== District 10 ===
District 10 general-election results, November 8, 2016
Party	Candidate	Votes	Vote share	Change vs. 2014 (pp)
Democratic	Charles Moseley	19,906	100.0%	▲42.9
Total votes		19,906	100.0%	—
Democratic hold

=== District 11 ===
District 11 general-election results, November 8, 2016
Party	Candidate	Votes	Vote share	Change vs. 2014 (pp)
Republican	Michael Aylesworth	18,163	60.5%	▲3.8
Democratic	James Metro	11,852	39.5%	▼3.8
Total votes		30,015	100.0%	—
Republican hold

=== District 12 ===
Democrat Mara Candelaria Reardon defeated Republican incumbent Bill Fine, the only seat to change party hands in the election. Reardon previously represented the district and worked for the Lake County Drug-Free Alliance.

District 12 general-election results, November 8, 2016
Party	Candidate	Votes	Vote share	Change vs. 2014 (pp)
Democratic	Mara Candelaria Reardon	15,979	54.7%	▲6.2
Republican	Bill Fine	13,246	45.3%	▼6.2
Total votes		29,225	100.0%	—
Democratic gain from Republican

=== District 13 ===
District 13 general-election results, November 8, 2016
Party	Candidate	Votes	Vote share	Change vs. 2014 (pp)
Republican	Sharon Negele	18,566	69.4%	▼30.6
Democratic	Mike Childress	8,167	30.6%	—
Total votes		26,733	100.0%	—
Republican hold

=== District 14 ===
District 14 general-election results, November 8, 2016
Party	Candidate	Votes	Vote share	Change vs. 2014 (pp)
Democratic	Vernon Smith	20,038	100.0%	0.0
Total votes		20,038	100.0%	—
Democratic hold

=== District 15 ===
District 15 general-election results, November 8, 2016
Party	Candidate	Votes	Vote share	Change vs. 2014 (pp)
Republican	Hal Slager	16,152	54.3%	▼4.3
Democratic	Tom O'Donnell	13,581	45.7%	▲4.3
Total votes		29,733	100.0%	—
Republican hold

=== District 16 ===
District 16 general-election results, November 8, 2016
Party	Candidate	Votes	Vote share	Change vs. 2014 (pp)
Republican	Douglas Gutwein	17,652	68.9%	▲4.4
Democratic	Richard Ludington	7,972	31.1%	▼4.4
Total votes		25,624	100.0%	—
Republican hold

=== District 17 ===
Republican representative Timothy Harman did not run for re-election. Jordan had served as president of the Bremen Public Schools Board.

==== Republican primary ====
Republican primary, May 3, 2016
Candidate	Votes	Vote share
Jack Jordan	6,381	55.8%
Jesse Bohannon	5,049	44.2%
Total	11,430	100.0%

==== General election ====
District 17 general-election results, November 8, 2016
Party	Candidate	Votes	Vote share	Change vs. 2014 (pp)
Republican	Jack Jordan	16,043	67.2%	▼32.8
Democratic	Michelle Livinghouse	7,826	32.8%	—
Total votes		23,869	100.0%	—
Republican hold

=== District 18 ===
District 18 general-election results, November 8, 2016
Party	Candidate	Votes	Vote share	Change vs. 2014 (pp)
Republican	David Wolkins	20,055	76.1%	▼23.9
Democratic	Dee M. Moore	6,287	23.9%	—
Total votes		26,342	100.0%	—
Republican hold

=== District 19 ===
Republican incumbent Julie Olthoff defeated Democrat Shelli VanDenburgh by 341 votes, the closest House result of the election.

District 19 general-election results, November 8, 2016
Party	Candidate	Votes	Vote share	Change vs. 2014 (pp)
Republican	Julie Olthoff	15,236	48.5%	▼2.6
Democratic	Shelli VanDenburgh	14,895	47.4%	▼1.5
Libertarian	Evan J. Demaree	1,288	4.1%	—
Total votes		31,419	100.0%	—
Republican hold

=== District 20 ===
Republican representative Tom Dermody did not run for re-election. Pressel owned a homebuilding firm he founded in 1992.

District 20 general-election results, November 8, 2016
Party	Candidate	Votes	Vote share	Change vs. 2014 (pp)
Republican	Jim Pressel	15,398	57.1%	▼42.9
Democratic	Karen Biernacki	10,432	38.7%	—
Libertarian	Aurea Torres	1,131	4.2%	—
Total votes		26,961	100.0%	—
Republican hold

=== District 21 ===
District 21 general-election results, November 8, 2016
Party	Candidate	Votes	Vote share	Change vs. 2014 (pp)
Republican	Timothy Wesco	13,275	61.8%	▼5.1
Democratic	Jodi Buoscio	7,140	33.3%	▲0.2
Libertarian	Ethan Legg	1,049	4.9%	—
Total votes		21,464	100.0%	—
Republican hold

=== District 22 ===
District 22 general-election results, November 8, 2016
Party	Candidate	Votes	Vote share	Change vs. 2014 (pp)
Republican	Curt Nisly	19,254	77.4%	▲6.6
Democratic	Brian Smith	5,624	22.6%	▼1.6
Total votes		24,878	100.0%	—
Republican hold

=== District 23 ===
District 23 general-election results, November 8, 2016
Party	Candidate	Votes	Vote share	Change vs. 2014 (pp)
Republican	Bill Friend	15,829	70.4%	▼29.6
Democratic	Rose Ryan	6,642	29.6%	—
Total votes		22,471	100.0%	—
Republican hold

=== District 24 ===
Republican incumbent Donna Schaibley defeated Greg Fettig in the primary before winning the general election.

==== Republican primary ====
Republican primary, May 3, 2016
Candidate	Votes	Vote share
Donna Schaibley	8,085	53.6%
Greg Fettig	6,987	46.4%
Total	15,072	100.0%

==== General election ====
District 24 general-election results, November 8, 2016
Party	Candidate	Votes	Vote share	Change vs. 2014 (pp)
Republican	Donna Schaibley	29,297	82.0%	▼18.0
Libertarian	Erol Ali Cetinok	6,450	18.0%	—
Total votes		35,747	100.0%	—
Republican hold

=== District 25 ===
==== Democratic primary ====
Democratic primary, May 3, 2016
Candidate	Votes	Vote share
Maurice Fuller	2,153	57.3%
Justin Notoras	1,605	42.7%
Total	3,758	100.0%

==== General election ====
District 25 general-election results, November 8, 2016
Party	Candidate	Votes	Vote share	Change vs. 2014 (pp)
Republican	Donald Lehe	19,273	69.0%	▼2.1
Democratic	Maurice Fuller	6,948	24.9%	▼4.1
Libertarian	Franklyn Voorhies	1,731	6.2%	—
Total votes		27,952	100.0%	—
Republican hold

=== District 26 ===
Republican representative Randolph Truitt did not run for re-election. Siegrist had served on the Tippecanoe County Council.

==== Democratic primary ====
Democratic primary, May 3, 2016
Candidate	Votes	Vote share
Victoria Woeste	2,708	58.6%
Deanna McMillan	1,913	41.4%
Total	4,621	100.0%

==== Republican primary ====
Republican primary, May 3, 2016
Candidate	Votes	Vote share
Sally Siegrist	4,046	62.7%
Gerry Keen	2,402	37.3%
Total	6,448	100.0%

==== General election ====
District 26 general-election results, November 8, 2016
Party	Candidate	Votes	Vote share	Change vs. 2014 (pp)
Republican	Sally Siegrist	11,067	52.6%	▼47.4
Democratic	Victoria Woeste	9,980	47.4%	—
Total votes		21,047	100.0%	—
Republican hold

=== District 27 ===
District 27 general-election results, November 8, 2016
Party	Candidate	Votes	Vote share	Change vs. 2014 (pp)
Democratic	Sheila Klinker	15,098	100.0%	▲48.2
Total votes		15,098	100.0%	—
Democratic hold

=== District 28 ===
==== Republican primary ====
Republican primary, May 3, 2016
Candidate	Votes	Vote share
Jeffrey Thompson	10,735	66.3%
Luke Stephenson	5,463	33.7%
Total	16,198	100.0%

==== General election ====
District 28 general-election results, November 8, 2016
Party	Candidate	Votes	Vote share	Change vs. 2014 (pp)
Republican	Jeffrey Thompson	27,982	100.0%	▲17.3
Total votes		27,982	100.0%	—
Republican hold

=== District 29 ===
District 29 general-election results, November 8, 2016
Party	Candidate	Votes	Vote share	Change vs. 2014 (pp)
Republican	Kathy Kreag Richardson	27,460	100.0%	▲26.0
Total votes		27,460	100.0%	—
Republican hold

=== District 30 ===
District 30 general-election results, November 8, 2016
Party	Candidate	Votes	Vote share	Change vs. 2014 (pp)
Republican	Mike Karickhoff	15,997	60.3%	▲2.5
Democratic	Natalie Guest	10,551	39.7%	▼2.5
Total votes		26,548	100.0%	—
Republican hold

=== District 31 ===
District 31 general-election results, November 8, 2016
Party	Candidate	Votes	Vote share	Change vs. 2014 (pp)
Republican	Kevin Mahan	15,274	65.8%	▼34.2
Democratic	Lynn Johnson	7,952	34.2%	—
Total votes		23,226	100.0%	—
Republican hold

=== District 32 ===
District 32 general-election results, November 8, 2016
Party	Candidate	Votes	Vote share	Change vs. 2014 (pp)
Republican	Tony Cook	22,112	74.9%	▲11.8
Democratic	Ryan Scott Davis	7,417	25.1%	▼11.8
Total votes		29,529	100.0%	—
Republican hold

=== District 33 ===
District 33 general-election results, November 8, 2016
Party	Candidate	Votes	Vote share	Change vs. 2014 (pp)
Republican	Greg Beumer	21,439	100.0%	▲40.4
Total votes		21,439	100.0%	—
Republican hold

=== District 34 ===
District 34 general-election results, November 8, 2016
Party	Candidate	Votes	Vote share	Change vs. 2014 (pp)
Democratic	Sue Errington	12,516	65.7%	0.0
Republican	Joe Shank	6,533	34.3%	0.0
Total votes		19,049	100.0%	—
Democratic hold

=== District 35 ===
District 35 general-election results, November 8, 2016
Party	Candidate	Votes	Vote share	Change vs. 2014 (pp)
Democratic	Melanie Wright	15,643	52.5%	▲1.9
Republican	Bill Walters	14,129	47.5%	▼1.9
Total votes		29,772	100.0%	—
Democratic hold

=== District 36 ===
District 36 general-election results, November 8, 2016
Party	Candidate	Votes	Vote share	Change vs. 2014 (pp)
Democratic	Terri Jo Austin	14,782	58.7%	▼2.3
Republican	Jim Shelton	10,405	41.3%	▲2.3
Total votes		25,187	100.0%	—
Democratic hold

=== District 37 ===
District 37 general-election results, November 8, 2016
Party	Candidate	Votes	Vote share	Change vs. 2014 (pp)
Republican	Todd Huston	22,403	64.0%	▼36.0
Democratic	Mike Boland	12,592	36.0%	—
Total votes		34,995	100.0%	—
Republican hold

=== District 38 ===
District 38 general-election results, November 8, 2016
Party	Candidate	Votes	Vote share	Change vs. 2014 (pp)
Republican	Heath VanNatter	18,623	74.7%	▼25.3
Independent	Jason Burns	6,303	25.3%	—
Total votes		24,926	100.0%	—
Republican hold

=== District 39 ===
==== Republican primary ====
Republican primary, May 3, 2016
Candidate	Votes	Vote share
Jerry Torr	7,896	52.6%
Tom Linkmeyer	7,111	47.4%
Total	15,007	100.0%

==== General election ====
District 39 general-election results, November 8, 2016
Party	Candidate	Votes	Vote share	Change vs. 2014 (pp)
Republican	Jerry Torr	23,591	65.1%	▼8.1
Democratic	David Russ	12,640	34.9%	▲8.1
Total votes		36,231	100.0%	—
Republican hold

=== District 40 ===
District 40 general-election results, November 8, 2016
Party	Candidate	Votes	Vote share	Change vs. 2014 (pp)
Republican	Gregory Steuerwald	24,968	100.0%	0.0
Total votes		24,968	100.0%	—
Republican hold

=== District 41 ===
District 41 general-election results, November 8, 2016
Party	Candidate	Votes	Vote share	Change vs. 2014 (pp)
Republican	Tim Brown	18,500	69.1%	▼30.9
Democratic	Howard Pollchik	5,238	19.6%	—
Libertarian	John Pickerill	3,043	11.4%	—
Total votes		26,781	100.0%	—
Republican hold

=== District 42 ===
District 42 general-election results, November 8, 2016
Party	Candidate	Votes	Vote share	Change vs. 2014 (pp)
Republican	Alan Morrison	14,901	56.6%	▲0.4
Democratic	Tim Skinner	11,434	43.4%	▼0.4
Total votes		26,335	100.0%	—
Republican hold

=== District 43 ===
District 43 general-election results, November 8, 2016
Party	Candidate	Votes	Vote share	Change vs. 2014 (pp)
Democratic	Clyde Kersey	16,445	100.0%	0.0
Total votes		16,445	100.0%	—
Democratic hold

=== District 44 ===
District 44 general-election results, November 8, 2016
Party	Candidate	Votes	Vote share	Change vs. 2014 (pp)
Republican	Jim Baird	17,927	69.0%	▼31.0
Democratic	Kimberly Fidler	8,073	31.1%	—
Total votes		26,000	100.0%	—
Republican hold

=== District 45 ===
District 45 general-election results, November 8, 2016
Party	Candidate	Votes	Vote share	Change vs. 2014 (pp)
Republican	Bruce Borders	19,193	100.0%	▲43.3
Total votes		19,193	100.0%	—
Republican hold

=== District 46 ===
District 46 general-election results, November 8, 2016
Party	Candidate	Votes	Vote share	Change vs. 2014 (pp)
Republican	Bob Heaton	17,333	64.9%	▲2.6
Democratic	Bill Breeden	9,369	35.1%	▼2.6
Total votes		26,702	100.0%	—
Republican hold

=== District 47 ===
Republican representative John Price did not run for re-election. Young practiced law in Indianapolis.

==== Republican primary ====
Republican primary, May 3, 2016
Candidate	Votes	Vote share
John Young	7,105	53.5%
Matt Prine	6,163	46.5%
Total	13,268	100.0%

==== General election ====
District 47 general-election results, November 8, 2016
Party	Candidate	Votes	Vote share	Change vs. 2014 (pp)
Republican	John Young	22,240	73.4%	▼3.4
Democratic	Mike Reddick	8,059	26.6%	▲3.4
Total votes		30,299	100.0%	—
Republican hold

=== District 48 ===
District 48 general-election results, November 8, 2016
Party	Candidate	Votes	Vote share	Change vs. 2014 (pp)
Republican	Doug Miller	14,710	66.4%	▼33.6
Democratic	James Barnes	7,438	33.6%	—
Total votes		22,148	100.0%	—
Republican hold

=== District 49 ===
District 49 general-election results, November 8, 2016
Party	Candidate	Votes	Vote share	Change vs. 2014 (pp)
Republican	Wes Culver	16,508	100.0%	▲16.9
Total votes		16,508	100.0%	—
Republican hold

=== District 50 ===
==== Republican primary ====
Republican primary, May 3, 2016
Candidate	Votes	Vote share
Dan Leonard	7,809	63.1%
Ted Harber	4,558	36.9%
Total	12,367	100.0%

==== General election ====
District 50 general-election results, November 8, 2016
Party	Candidate	Votes	Vote share	Change vs. 2014 (pp)
Republican	Dan Leonard	19,561	73.1%	▼26.9
Democratic	Jorge Fernandez	7,181	26.9%	—
Total votes		26,742	100.0%	—
Republican hold

=== District 51 ===
District 51 general-election results, November 8, 2016
Party	Candidate	Votes	Vote share	Change vs. 2014 (pp)
Republican	Dennis Zent	17,664	100.0%	0.0
Total votes		17,664	100.0%	—
Republican hold

=== District 52 ===
District 52 general-election results, November 8, 2016
Party	Candidate	Votes	Vote share	Change vs. 2014 (pp)
Republican	Ben Smaltz	21,016	75.0%	▼0.4
Democratic	Charlie Odier	7,009	25.0%	▲0.4
Total votes		28,025	100.0%	—
Republican hold

=== District 53 ===
District 53 general-election results, November 8, 2016
Party	Candidate	Votes	Vote share	Change vs. 2014 (pp)
Republican	Robert Cherry	19,964	69.5%	▼11.7
Democratic	Nancy Tibbett	6,780	23.6%	—
Libertarian	Rick Brown	1,979	6.9%	▼11.9
Total votes		28,723	100.0%	—
Republican hold

=== District 54 ===
District 54 general-election results, November 8, 2016
Party	Candidate	Votes	Vote share	Change vs. 2014 (pp)
Republican	Tom Saunders	17,726	72.9%	▼0.4
Libertarian	Zachary Lee	6,605	27.1%	▲0.4
Independent	Jeff Embry	1	0.0%	—
Total votes		24,332	100.0%	—
Republican hold

=== District 55 ===
District 55 general-election results, November 8, 2016
Party	Candidate	Votes	Vote share	Change vs. 2014 (pp)
Republican	Cindy Ziemke	20,302	76.3%	▲5.5
Democratic	Mimi Pruett	6,295	23.7%	▼5.5
Total votes		26,597	100.0%	—
Republican hold

=== District 56 ===
District 56 general-election results, November 8, 2016
Party	Candidate	Votes	Vote share	Change vs. 2014 (pp)
Republican	Dick Hamm	14,463	61.3%	▲2.0
Democratic	Karen Chasteen	9,125	38.7%	▲5.2
Total votes		23,588	100.0%	—
Republican hold

=== District 57 ===
District 57 general-election results, November 8, 2016
Party	Candidate	Votes	Vote share	Change vs. 2014 (pp)
Republican	Sean Eberhart	23,085	100.0%	0.0
Total votes		23,085	100.0%	—
Republican hold

=== District 58 ===
District 58 general-election results, November 8, 2016
Party	Candidate	Votes	Vote share	Change vs. 2014 (pp)
Republican	Charles Burton	19,213	66.6%	▼33.4
Democratic	Edward O'Connor	9,616	33.4%	—
Total votes		28,829	100.0%	—
Republican hold

=== District 59 ===
Republican incumbent Milo Smith won a three-candidate primary before defeating Democrat Bob Pitman in the general election.

==== Democratic primary ====
Democratic primary, May 3, 2016
Candidate	Votes	Vote share
Bob Pitman	2,472	53.9%
Dale Nowlin	2,118	46.1%
Total	4,590	100.0%

==== Republican primary ====
Republican primary, May 3, 2016
Candidate	Votes	Vote share
Milo Smith	5,883	47.2%
Ryan Lauer	4,825	38.7%
Lew Wilson	1,746	14.0%
Total	12,454	100.0%

==== General election ====
District 59 general-election results, November 8, 2016
Party	Candidate	Votes	Vote share	Change vs. 2014 (pp)
Republican	Milo Smith	16,118	61.2%	▲1.6
Democratic	Bob Pitman	10,205	38.8%	▼1.6
Total votes		26,323	100.0%	—
Republican hold

=== District 60 ===
District 60 general-election results, November 8, 2016
Party	Candidate	Votes	Vote share	Change vs. 2014 (pp)
Republican	Peggy Mayfield	18,885	63.4%	▼0.4
Democratic	Penny Githens	10,882	36.6%	▲0.4
Total votes		29,767	100.0%	—
Republican hold

=== District 61 ===
District 61 general-election results, November 8, 2016
Party	Candidate	Votes	Vote share	Change vs. 2014 (pp)
Democratic	Matt Pierce	15,608	78.8%	▼21.2
Independent	Drew Ash	4,208	21.2%	—
Total votes		19,816	100.0%	—
Democratic hold

=== District 62 ===
==== Republican primary ====
Republican primary, May 3, 2016
Candidate	Votes	Vote share
Jeff Ellington	6,871	62.8%
Sawyer Sparks	4,066	37.2%
Total	10,937	100.0%

==== General election ====
District 62 general-election results, November 8, 2016
Party	Candidate	Votes	Vote share	Change vs. 2014 (pp)
Republican	Jeff Ellington	16,724	59.1%	▲4.1
Democratic	Steve Lindsey	11,589	40.9%	▼0.1
Total votes		28,313	100.0%	—
Republican hold

=== District 63 ===
District 63 general-election results, November 8, 2016
Party	Candidate	Votes	Vote share	Change vs. 2014 (pp)
Republican	Mike Braun	19,228	71.8%	▼28.2
Democratic	Andrea Hulsman	7,570	28.2%	—
Total votes		26,798	100.0%	—
Republican hold

=== District 64 ===
==== Republican primary ====
Republican primary, May 3, 2016
Candidate	Votes	Vote share
Thomas Washburne	7,445	58.1%
Ann Ennis	5,380	41.9%
Total	12,825	100.0%

==== General election ====
District 64 general-election results, November 8, 2016
Party	Candidate	Votes	Vote share	Change vs. 2014 (pp)
Republican	Thomas Washburne	25,506	100.0%	0.0
Total votes		25,506	100.0%	—
Republican hold

=== District 65 ===
Republican representative Eric Koch did not run for re-election. Christopher May won a six-candidate Republican primary for the seat vacated by Eric Koch and won the general election. May had served three terms as a Lawrence County commissioner.

==== Republican primary ====
Republican primary, May 3, 2016
Candidate	Votes	Vote share
Christopher May	5,487	42.8%
Jim Pfaff	2,355	18.4%
Mark Mathis	1,655	12.9%
Franklin Andrew	1,488	11.6%
Jacob Franklin	924	7.2%
Darren Byrd	903	7.0%
Total	12,812	100.0%

==== General election ====
District 65 general-election results, November 8, 2016
Party	Candidate	Votes	Vote share	Change vs. 2014 (pp)
Republican	Christopher May	18,290	62.7%	▼37.3
Democratic	Chris Woods	10,871	37.3%	—
Total votes		29,161	100.0%	—
Republican hold

=== District 66 ===
District 66 general-election results, November 8, 2016
Party	Candidate	Votes	Vote share	Change vs. 2014 (pp)
Democratic	Terry Goodin	15,939	60.3%	▲1.3
Republican	Joe Van Wye	10,484	39.7%	▼1.3
Total votes		26,423	100.0%	—
Democratic hold

=== District 67 ===
District 67 general-election results, November 8, 2016
Party	Candidate	Votes	Vote share	Change vs. 2014 (pp)
Republican	Randy Frye	20,492	77.1%	▼22.9
Democratic	Rudy Howard	6,101	22.9%	—
Total votes		26,593	100.0%	—
Republican hold

=== District 68 ===
District 68 general-election results, November 8, 2016
Party	Candidate	Votes	Vote share	Change vs. 2014 (pp)
Republican	Randy Lyness	22,451	75.1%	▲5.2
Democratic	Jake Hoog	7,457	24.9%	▼5.2
Total votes		29,908	100.0%	—
Republican hold

=== District 69 ===
==== Republican primary ====
Republican primary, May 3, 2016
Candidate	Votes	Vote share
Jim Lucas	7,705	65.6%
Nancy Franke	4,044	34.4%
Total	11,749	100.0%

==== General election ====
District 69 general-election results, November 8, 2016
Party	Candidate	Votes	Vote share	Change vs. 2014 (pp)
Republican	Jim Lucas	20,765	100.0%	0.0
Total votes		20,765	100.0%	—
Republican hold

=== District 70 ===
Republican representative Rhonda Rhoads did not run for re-election. Engleman had been the Harrison County auditor.

District 70 general-election results, November 8, 2016
Party	Candidate	Votes	Vote share	Change vs. 2014 (pp)
Republican	Karen Engleman	20,966	65.5%	▲6.7
Democratic	Heidi Sellers	11,020	34.5%	▼6.7
Total votes		31,986	100.0%	—
Republican hold

=== District 71 ===
District 71 general-election results, November 8, 2016
Party	Candidate	Votes	Vote share	Change vs. 2014 (pp)
Democratic	Steven Stemler	18,728	80.4%	▼3.5
Libertarian	Thomas Keister	4,578	19.6%	▲3.5
Total votes		23,306	100.0%	—
Democratic hold

=== District 72 ===
District 72 general-election results, November 8, 2016
Party	Candidate	Votes	Vote share	Change vs. 2014 (pp)
Republican	Ed Clere	18,092	57.2%	▲0.7
Democratic	Steve Bonifer	13,511	42.8%	▼0.7
Total votes		31,603	100.0%	—
Republican hold

=== District 73 ===
==== Republican primary ====
Republican primary, May 3, 2016
Candidate	Votes	Vote share
Steve Davisson	7,908	72.3%
Michael Harkness	3,030	27.7%
Total	10,938	100.0%

==== General election ====
District 73 general-election results, November 8, 2016
Party	Candidate	Votes	Vote share	Change vs. 2014 (pp)
Republican	Steve Davisson	18,722	72.8%	▲2.6
Democratic	Douglas Leatherbury	6,992	27.2%	▼2.6
Total votes		25,714	100.0%	—
Republican hold

=== District 74 ===
District 74 general-election results, November 8, 2016
Party	Candidate	Votes	Vote share	Change vs. 2014 (pp)
Republican	Lloyd Arnold	16,538	59.7%	▼1.6
Democratic	Larry Kleeman	11,156	40.3%	▲1.6
Total votes		27,694	100.0%	—
Republican hold

=== District 75 ===
District 75 general-election results, November 8, 2016
Party	Candidate	Votes	Vote share	Change vs. 2014 (pp)
Republican	Ron Bacon	21,146	69.2%	▲2.6
Democratic	Pete Rapp	9,429	30.8%	▼2.6
Total votes		30,575	100.0%	—
Republican hold

=== District 76 ===
District 76 general-election results, November 8, 2016
Party	Candidate	Votes	Vote share	Change vs. 2014 (pp)
Republican	Wendy McNamara	21,885	100.0%	▲37.0
Total votes		21,885	100.0%	—
Republican hold

=== District 77 ===
Democratic representative Gail Riecken did not run for re-election. Hatfield worked as a Vanderburgh County deputy prosecutor.

==== Democratic primary ====
Democratic primary, May 3, 2016
Candidate	Votes	Vote share
Ryan Hatfield	2,717	43.6%
Lori Sherman	2,507	40.3%
Brandon Ferguson	1,001	16.1%
Total	6,225	100.0%

==== Republican primary ====
Republican primary, May 3, 2016
Candidate	Votes	Vote share
Johnny Kincaid	2,848	57.8%
Billy Garrett	1,039	21.1%
Henrietta Jenkins	1,039	21.1%
Total	4,926	100.0%

==== General election ====
District 77 general-election results, November 8, 2016
Party	Candidate	Votes	Vote share	Change vs. 2014 (pp)
Democratic	Ryan Hatfield	12,616	59.4%	▼2.5
Republican	Johnny Kincaid	8,614	40.6%	▲2.5
Total votes		21,230	100.0%	—
Democratic hold

=== District 78 ===
District 78 general-election results, November 8, 2016
Party	Candidate	Votes	Vote share	Change vs. 2014 (pp)
Republican	Holli Sullivan	19,208	66.4%	▲2.6
Democratic	Philip Bennett	9,704	33.6%	▼2.6
Total votes		28,912	100.0%	—
Republican hold

=== District 79 ===
District 79 general-election results, November 8, 2016
Party	Candidate	Votes	Vote share	Change vs. 2014 (pp)
Republican	Matthew Lehman	22,994	100.0%	0.0
Total votes		22,994	100.0%	—
Republican hold

=== District 80 ===
District 80 general-election results, November 8, 2016
Party	Candidate	Votes	Vote share	Change vs. 2014 (pp)
Democratic	Phil GiaQuinta	14,840	100.0%	0.0
Total votes		14,840	100.0%	—
Democratic hold

=== District 81 ===
District 81 general-election results, November 8, 2016
Party	Candidate	Votes	Vote share	Change vs. 2014 (pp)
Republican	Martin Carbaugh	13,925	60.9%	▲1.4
Democratic	Bob Haddad	8,938	39.1%	▼1.4
Total votes		22,863	100.0%	—
Republican hold

=== District 82 ===
District 82 general-election results, November 8, 2016
Party	Candidate	Votes	Vote share	Change vs. 2014 (pp)
Republican	David Ober	17,833	75.3%	▼1.7
Democratic	Mike Wilber	5,863	24.7%	▲1.7
Total votes		23,696	100.0%	—
Republican hold

=== District 83 ===
District 83 general-election results, November 8, 2016
Party	Candidate	Votes	Vote share	Change vs. 2014 (pp)
Republican	Christopher N. Judy	27,352	100.0%	0.0
Total votes		27,352	100.0%	—
Republican hold

=== District 84 ===
==== Democratic primary ====
Democratic primary, May 3, 2016
Candidate	Votes	Vote share
Curtis Nash	2,579	54.2%
Donny Manco	2,178	45.8%
Total	4,757	100.0%

==== General election ====
District 84 general-election results, November 8, 2016
Party	Candidate	Votes	Vote share	Change vs. 2014 (pp)
Republican	Bob Morris	20,559	66.1%	▼0.6
Democratic	Curtis Nash	10,544	33.9%	▲0.6
Total votes		31,103	100.0%	—
Republican hold

=== District 85 ===
Republican Dave Heine defeated incumbent Casey Cox in the May primary and then won the general election against Democrat Kathy Zoucha. Heine had worked for Do it Best Corp. for 28 years.

==== Republican primary ====
Republican primary, May 3, 2016
Candidate	Votes	Vote share
Dave Heine	7,849	59.3%
Casey Cox	4,218	31.9%
Denny Worman	1,162	8.8%
Total	13,229	100.0%

==== General election ====
District 85 general-election results, November 8, 2016
Party	Candidate	Votes	Vote share	Change vs. 2014 (pp)
Republican	Dave Heine	19,198	73.3%	▼26.7
Democratic	Kathy Zoucha	7,006	26.7%	—
Total votes		26,204	100.0%	—
Republican hold

=== District 86 ===
District 86 general-election results, November 8, 2016
Party	Candidate	Votes	Vote share	Change vs. 2014 (pp)
Democratic	Edward DeLaney	22,285	62.2%	▼37.8
Republican	Scott DeVries	12,049	33.6%	—
Libertarian	Ethan Owens	1,488	4.2%	—
Total votes		35,822	100.0%	—
Democratic hold

=== District 87 ===
Democratic representative Christina Hale withdrew from the House race after the primary to seek the lieutenant governorship. Democrat Carey Hamilton defeated Republican Connie Eckert in the open-seat general election. Hamilton headed the Indiana Recycling Coalition.

District 87 general-election results, November 8, 2016
Party	Candidate	Votes	Vote share	Change vs. 2014 (pp)
Democratic	Carey Hamilton	17,485	52.2%	▲0.7
Republican	Connie Eckert	15,982	47.8%	▼0.7
Total votes		33,467	100.0%	—
Democratic hold

=== District 88 ===
District 88 general-election results, November 8, 2016
Party	Candidate	Votes	Vote share	Change vs. 2014 (pp)
Republican	Brian Bosma	24,550	65.3%	▼34.7
Democratic	Dana Black	13,059	34.7%	—
Total votes		37,609	100.0%	—
Republican hold

=== District 89 ===
District 89 general-election results, November 8, 2016
Party	Candidate	Votes	Vote share	Change vs. 2014 (pp)
Republican	Cindy Kirchhofer	13,683	54.6%	▼4.6
Democratic	Rachel Burke	11,367	45.4%	▲4.6
Total votes		25,050	100.0%	—
Republican hold

=== District 90 ===
District 90 general-election results, November 8, 2016
Party	Candidate	Votes	Vote share	Change vs. 2014 (pp)
Republican	Mike Speedy	19,019	63.6%	▼36.4
Democratic	Lacy Hollings	9,515	31.8%	—
Libertarian	Douglas McNaughton	1,348	4.5%	—
Total votes		29,882	100.0%	—
Republican hold

=== District 91 ===
==== Republican primary ====
Republican primary, May 3, 2016
Candidate	Votes	Vote share
Robert Behning	5,511	61.8%
Jim Grimes	3,406	38.2%
Total	8,917	100.0%

==== General election ====
District 91 general-election results, November 8, 2016
Party	Candidate	Votes	Vote share	Change vs. 2014 (pp)
Republican	Robert Behning	17,389	100.0%	▲33.6
Total votes		17,389	100.0%	—
Republican hold

=== District 92 ===
District 92 general-election results, November 8, 2016
Party	Candidate	Votes	Vote share	Change vs. 2014 (pp)
Democratic	Karlee Macer	14,000	60.9%	▲9.7
Republican	Bradford Moulton	8,973	39.1%	▼6.8
Total votes		22,973	100.0%	—
Democratic hold

=== District 93 ===
District 93 general-election results, November 8, 2016
Party	Candidate	Votes	Vote share	Change vs. 2014 (pp)
Republican	David Frizzell	18,407	67.4%	▼4.7
Democratic	Greg Rathnow	8,923	32.6%	▲4.7
Total votes		27,330	100.0%	—
Republican hold

=== District 94 ===
District 94 general-election results, November 8, 2016
Party	Candidate	Votes	Vote share	Change vs. 2014 (pp)
Democratic	Cherrish Pryor	21,416	100.0%	0.0
Total votes		21,416	100.0%	—
Democratic hold

=== District 95 ===
District 95 general-election results, November 8, 2016
Party	Candidate	Votes	Vote share	Change vs. 2014 (pp)
Democratic	John Bartlett	18,044	87.2%	▼12.8
Libertarian	Nathanael L. Ginn	2,640	12.8%	—
Total votes		20,684	100.0%	—
Democratic hold

=== District 96 ===
District 96 general-election results, November 8, 2016
Party	Candidate	Votes	Vote share	Change vs. 2014 (pp)
Democratic	Gregory Porter	26,683	100.0%	▲16.0
Total votes		26,683	100.0%	—
Democratic hold

=== District 97 ===
District 97 general-election results, November 8, 2016
Party	Candidate	Votes	Vote share	Change vs. 2014 (pp)
Democratic	Justin Moed	9,834	61.0%	▼39.0
Republican	Dale Nye	6,300	39.0%	—
Total votes		16,134	100.0%	—
Democratic hold

=== District 98 ===
District 98 general-election results, November 8, 2016
Party	Candidate	Votes	Vote share	Change vs. 2014 (pp)
Democratic	Robin Shackleford	16,354	81.4%	▼7.9
Republican	Gary Whitmore	3,747	18.6%	—
Total votes		20,101	100.0%	—
Democratic hold

=== District 99 ===
District 99 general-election results, November 8, 2016
Party	Candidate	Votes	Vote share	Change vs. 2014 (pp)
Democratic	Vanessa Summers	19,352	100.0%	0.0
Total votes		19,352	100.0%	—
Democratic hold

=== District 100 ===
District 100 general-election results, November 8, 2016
Party	Candidate	Votes	Vote share	Change vs. 2014 (pp)
Democratic	Dan Forestal	14,110	67.2%	▼32.8
Republican	Larry Shouse	6,894	32.8%	—
Total votes		21,004	100.0%	—
Democratic hold

== See also ==
- 2016 Indiana Senate election
- 2016 Indiana elections
- Indiana House of Representatives
