= Shelli VanDenburgh =

American politician

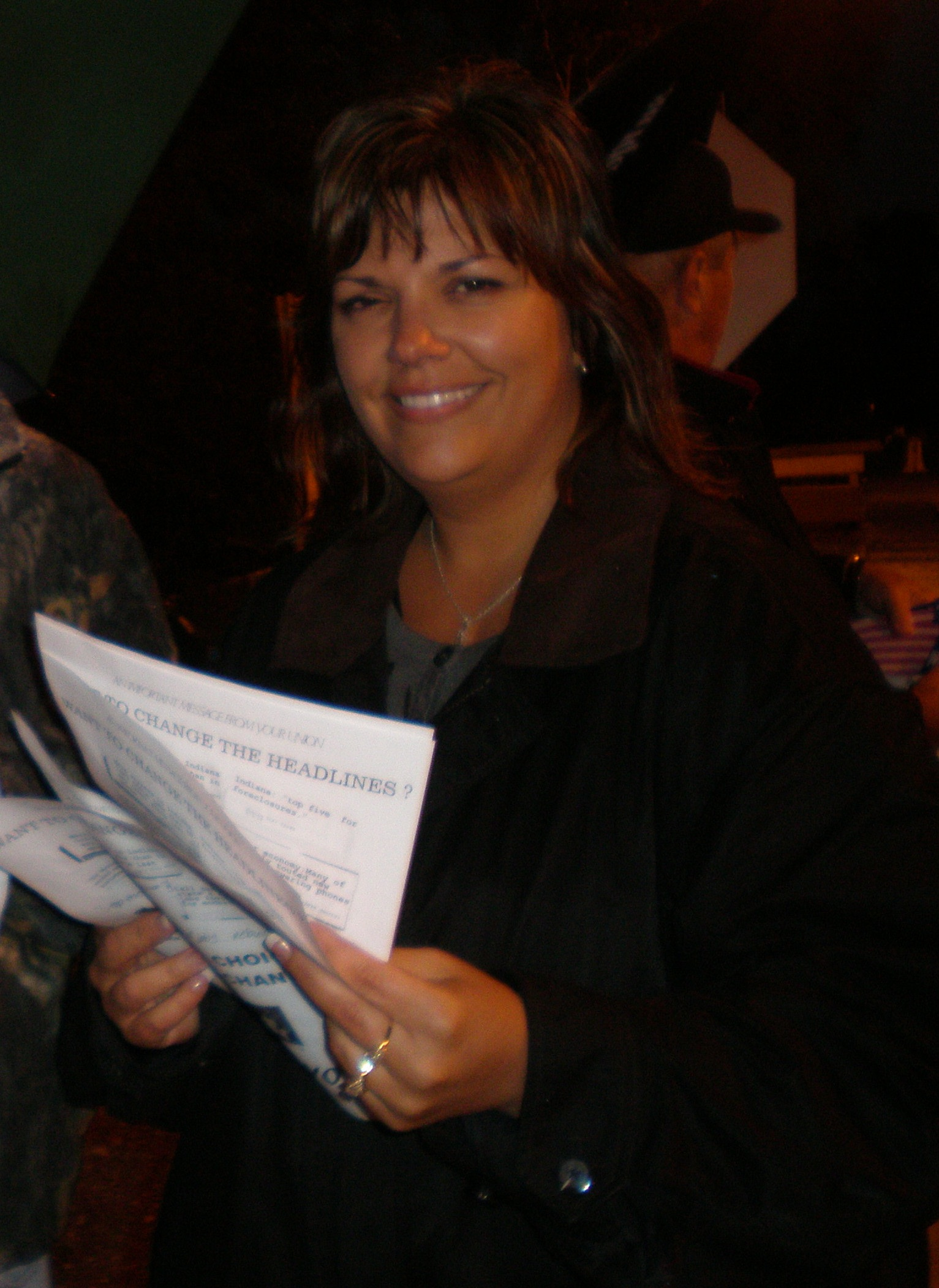
- VanDenburgh in 2008

Member of the Indiana House of Representatives from the 19th district
- In office July 9, 2007 – November 19, 2014
- Preceded by: Robert Kuzman
- Succeeded by: Julie Olthoff

Personal details
- Born: October 21, 1969 (age 56)
- Party: Democratic
- Spouse: Tim
- Children: R.J. and Bailey

Rochelle "Shelli" VanDenburgh (born October 21, 1969) is a former Democratic member of the Indiana House of Representatives, representing the 19th District from 2007 to 2014. She served as the Vice Chair of the Family, Children and Human Affairs Committee, and also served on the Small Business and Economic Development, Elections and Apportionment, Education, and Utilities and Commerce committees. She championed legislation supporting both children and working-class families in her tenure. In her last term, Representative VanDenburgh served as a member of the House Minority leadership team. In 2014, VanDenburgh was recognized with the prestigious "Democratic Woman of the Year" award for her work in the Indiana Legislature.

VanDenburgh was the Director of the Child Support Division in the Lake County Clerk's Office from 1995 until her resignation in May 2008. Appointed to the state legislature in July 2007 upon the resignation of Democratic incumbent Robert Kuzman, VanDenburgh subsequently won reelection three times in 2008, 2010 and 2012. In 2014, VanDenburgh was challenged by Republican Julie Olthoff in the general election. On November 4, 2014, VanDenburgh was unseated by Olthoff, losing the election 6,834 votes to Olthoff's 7,136, or, 48.8% to 51.1%.
