= Randy Truitt =

American politician

Member of the Indiana House of Representatives from the 26th district
- In office 2008–2016
- Preceded by: Joe Micon
- Succeeded by: Sally Siegrist

Member of the West Lafayette City Council from the at-large district
- In office 2004–2008
- Preceded by: Barbara Sparby
- Succeeded by: Steven Dietrich

Personal details
- Born: West Lafayette, Indiana
- Party: Republican
- Spouse: Krista
- Education: Purdue University; Indiana Wesleyan University (MBA)
- Occupation: Businessman

Randy Truitt is an American politician and businessman who was a member of the Indiana House of Representatives representing District 26 which includes portions of Tippecanoe and Warren County from 2008 to 2016. Prior to 2008, he was a member of the West Lafayette, Indiana City Council. After eight years in state government, Truitt did not re-run for election in 2016 and returned his focus to his real estate firm.

== Life ==
Truitt graduated from West Lafayette High School in 1986 and from Purdue University in 1990, receiving a bachelor's degree from the School of Technology. He later received his M.B.A. from Indiana Wesleyan University in 2002.

Truitt is married and has three children.
