= Bill Fine =

American politician

Member of the Indiana House of Representatives from the 12th district
- In office November 5, 2014 – November 9, 2016
- Preceded by: Mara Candelaria Reardon
- Succeeded by: Mara Candelaria Reardon

Personal details
- Born: Hammond, IN
- Party: Republican
- Education: Indiana University; Purdue Calumet
- Occupation: Politician

William I. Fine is an American politician who served as a member of the Indiana House of Representatives. He was a Republican member representing District 12 from 2014 to 2016. Fine was appointed to serve as the state's Office of Utility Consumer Counselor in 2016.

== Early life, education and career ==
Fine is a Phi Beta Kappa graduate of Indiana University and earned a J.D. from Indiana University in 1976. He also hold a Masters in Arts in English from Purdue Calumet. Fine served as an attorney in Lake County until his appointment as Office of Utility Consumer Counselor. He is Jewish.

== Political career ==
In 2010, Fine ran as a Republican candidate for Judge of the Lake Circuit Court.

In 2012, Fine ran for District 12, losing in the general election to Democrat Mara Candelaria Reardon. The two ran again in 2014, which Fine won. The two ran for a third time in 2016, won by Reardon.

== Election results ==
=== 2010 ===
2010 Indiana General Election
Party	Candidate	Votes	%	±%
Democratic	George C. Paras		62%	
Republican	William I. Fine		38%	

=== 2012 ===
2012 Indiana General Election
Party	Candidate	Votes	%	±%
Democratic	Mara Candelaria Reardon		54%	
Republican	William I. (Bill) Fine		46%	

=== 2014 ===
2014 Indiana General Election
Party	Candidate	Votes	%	±%
Democratic	Mara Candelaria Reardon		49%	
Republican	William I. (Bill) Fine		51%	

=== 2016 ===
2016 Indiana General Election
Party	Candidate	Votes	%	±%
Democratic	Mara Candelaria Reardon		55%	
Republican	William I. (Bill) Fine		45%	
