= Chris Chyung =

American politician

Member of the Indiana House of Representatives from the 15th district
- In office 2018–2020
- Preceded by: Hal Slager
- Succeeded by: Hal Slager

Personal details
- Born: Merrillville, Indiana, U.S.
- Party: Democratic
- Education: Columbia University

Chris Chyung is a real estate businessman who served in the Indiana House of Representatives from 2018 to 2020. Chyung was the first Asian American and was the youngest person serving in the Indiana House at the time.

== Early life ==
Chyung was born in Merrillville, Indiana to Korean immigrants who worked as physicians in the local area. He was raised in Munster, Indiana and attended Munster High School and later Columbia University, where he studied industrial engineering and graduated in 2016. After graduation, Chyung completed internships in New York and Chicago before resettling in Indiana and founding a real estate business.

== Political career ==
In 2016, Chyung was spurred to run for office following the ongoing debate on immigration in the United States. In the 2018 election, Chyung defeated third term incumbent representative Hal Slager by 82 votes. This was seen as a surprise victory because internal polling had put Chyung behind Slager 54–37. Chyung faced Anti-Asian racism during his campaign and was frequently told "go back to China", despite the fact that he is Korean American.

During his time in the Indiana House, he proposed lowering the minimum age to serve in the Legislature to 18 from 25 in the Indiana Senate and 21 in the House. With Senator Mark Stoops, Chyung authored a bill attempting to ban conversion therapy for LGBT youth under age 18. Chyung called for increases in the state education budget, crackdowns on payday lenders, and support for affordable housing and housing vouchers for veterans. In his second campaign, he promised voters that he would not serve for more than eight years in office. In both of his campaigns Chyung did not accept corporate donations.

The 2020 election was again a race between Chyung and Slager, and was held during the COVID-19 pandemic in Indiana. Despite an endorsement by South Bend Mayor Pete Buttigieg, Slager defeated Chyung on election day.

Following his defeat, Chyung was critical not only of his own campaign but of Indiana Democratic chair John Zody and defund the police messaging.
