= Chris Campbell (politician) =

American politician

Member of the Indiana House of Representatives from the 26th district
- Incumbent
- Assumed office November 7, 2018
- Preceded by: Sally Siegrist

Personal details
- Born: December 12, 1963 (age 62) La Porte, Indiana, U.S.
- Party: Democratic
- Education: Purdue University (BS, MS)

Chris Campbell (born December 12, 1963) is an American politician and audiologist serving as a member of the Indiana House of Representatives from House District 26. She assumed office on November 7, 2018.

== Early life and education ==
Campbell was born in La Porte, Indiana. She earned a Bachelor of Science and Master of Science in audiology from Purdue University.

== Career ==
Campbell began her career as an audiology fellow at the Indianapolis Hearing Center. She later worked as an audiologist at the Lifeline Rehabilitation Center, Saint Elizabeth Regional Health & Home Hospital, and Lafayette ENT. She was elected to the Indiana House of Representatives in November 2018. Since 2019, she has served as ranking member of the House Government and Regulatory Reform Committee.
