= Sally Siegrist =

American politician (1951–2022)

Member of the Indiana House of Representatives from the 26th district
- In office November 22, 2016 – November 20, 2018
- Preceded by: Randy Truitt
- Succeeded by: Chris Campbell

Personal details
- Born: October 5, 1951 Lafayette, Indiana, U.S.
- Died: May 1, 2022 (aged 70) West Lafayette, Indiana, U.S.
- Party: Republican
- Education: Indiana University Bloomington (BA); Purdue University (MS)

Sally Siegrist (October 5, 1951 – May 1, 2022) was an American politician who served in the Indiana House of Representatives from House District 26 from 2016 to 2018. She died on May 1, 2022.

== Early life and education ==
Siegrist earned a bachelor of arts in communication and media studies from Indiana University Bloomington and a master of business administration from Purdue University Daniels School of Business.
