= Hal Slager =

American politician

Harold "Hal" Slager
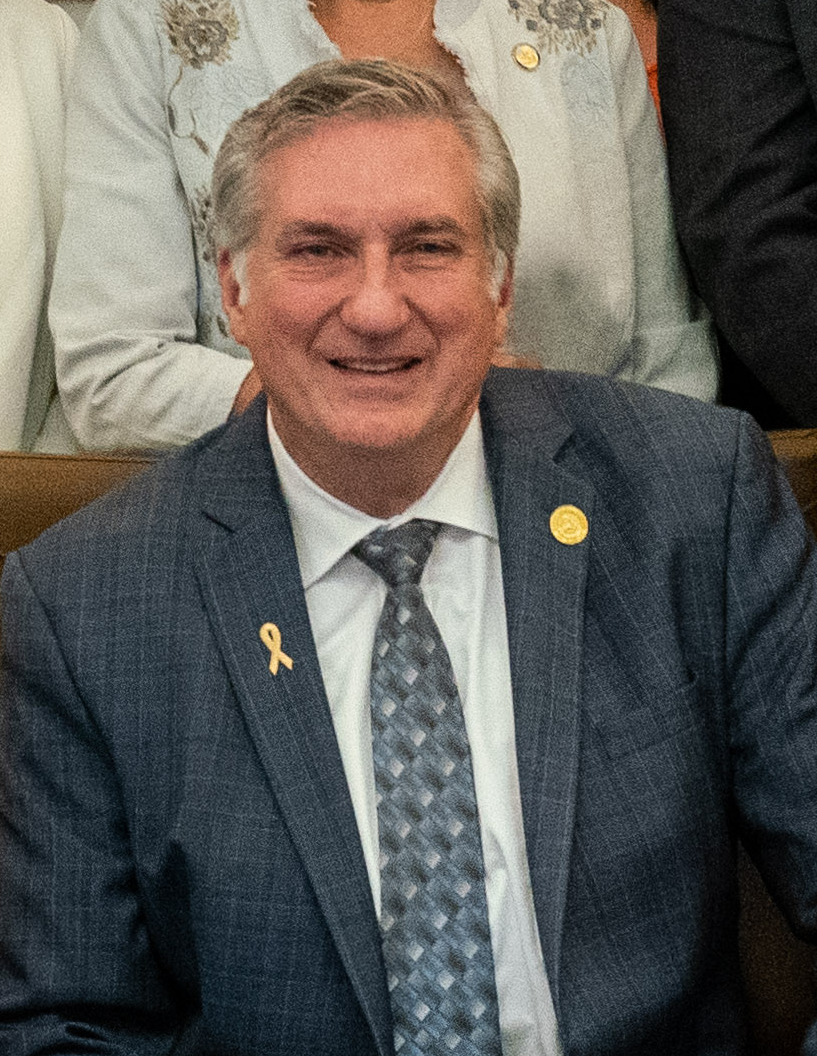

Member of the Indiana House of Representatives from the 15th district
- Incumbent
- Assumed office November 17, 2020
- Preceded by: Chris Chyung
- In office November 20, 2012 – November 20, 2018
- Preceded by: Donald Lehe
- Succeeded by: Chris Chyung

Personal details
- Party: Republican
- Education: Butler University (BS)

Harold "Hal" Slager is a member of the Indiana House of Representatives. He is a CPA by profession. Slager was elected to the Indiana House in 2012. He previously served on the Schererville Town Council from 2003 to 2012. He was educated at Butler University. Slager is a Roman Catholic.
