= Mara Candelaria Reardon =

American politician from Indiana

Member of the Indiana House of Representatives from the 12th district
- In office November 9, 2016 – November 4, 2020
- Preceded by: Bill Fine
- Succeeded by: Mike Andrade
- In office November 8, 2006 – November 5, 2014
- Preceded by: John Aguilera
- Succeeded by: Bill Fine

Personal details
- Born: East Chicago, Indiana
- Party: Democratic
- Spouse: Matthew
- Education: Indiana University Northwest
- Occupation: Legislator

Mara Candelaria Reardon is an American politician who was a member of the Indiana House of Representatives. Candelaria Reardon is a member of the Democratic Party. She was first elected in 2006. She was defeated in the 2014 general election by Republican Bill Fine, but defeated him in the 2016 general election.

Candelaria Reardon was a candidate for the Democratic nomination for Indiana's 1st congressional district, to replace retiring incumbent Pete Visclosky. She announced her run on November 21, 2019. Frank J. Mrvan of Lake County won the nomination and the seat in Congress.

== Biography ==
Candelaria Reardon was born in East Chicago, Indiana, in 1964. She is the daughter of Isabelino "Cande" Candelaria, the first Puerto Rican appointed to a city council in Indiana, and Victoria Soto Candelaria, the first Latina elected as president of the Indiana Federation of Teachers. She graduated from Munster High School in Munster, Indiana, in 1982. She attended Indiana University Northwest for her undergraduate degree and attended John Marshall School of Law in Chicago.

== Political career ==
She chaired the Board of Hispanic Caucus Chairs (BHCC), serves as chair of the National Association of Elected and Appointed Officials (NALEO) Education Fund board of directors, and is a member of the National Hispanic Caucus of State Legislators (NHCSL).

Reardon has advocated for greater funding for drug addiction treatment and legalizing medical marijuana.

She has generally opposed cuts to public education funding, limits on collective bargaining, cuts to unemployment insurance programs, repealing Common Core education standards, and directing state funding to private charter schools.

In July 2018, Reardon was one of five women who alleged they were sexually harassed by Indiana Attorney General Curtis Hill, a Republican, while celebrating the end of the General Assembly session at AJ's Lounge, an adult party bar and the oldest African-American-owned bar in Indianapolis. He denied the allegations. Reardon and three other women filed a civil lawsuit against Hill. On March 2, 2020, the lawsuit and all federal claims in the civil case brought against the attorney general by Candelaria and three other women were dismissed by federal Judge Jane Magnus-Stinson of the U.S. District Court of Southern Indiana. They refiled their suit in state court.

In the 2020 elections, Reardon ran for the United States House of Representatives seat in Indiana's 1st congressional district, where incumbent Pete Visclosky was retiring. There were 14 candidates, including Frank J. Mrvan, supported by Visclosky as his chosen successor. Mrvan won both the Democratic nomination and the general election.

In 2022, Candelaria Reardon was appointed by President Biden to US Department of Commerce, where she served as deputy director of public engagement for the National Telecommunications and Information Administration and later served as a senior advisor to the White House Initiative for Educational and Economic Excellence for Hispanics. Candelaria Reardon also serves on the board of directors of Indiana American Water. She is a lifetime member of the National Association of Latino Elected and Appointed Officials (NALEO).

== Election results ==
=== 2012 ===
2012 Indiana General Election
Party	Candidate	Votes	%	±%
Democratic	Mara Candelaria Reardon		54%	
Republican	William I. (Bill) Fine		46%	

=== 2014 ===
2014 Indiana General Election
Party	Candidate	Votes	%	±%
Democratic	Mara Candelaria Reardon		49%	
Republican	William I. (Bill) Fine		51%	

=== 2016 ===
2016 Indiana General Election
Party	Candidate	Votes	%	±%
Democratic	Mara Candelaria Reardon		55%	
Republican	William I. (Bill) Fine		45%	

=== 2018 ===
2018 Indiana General Election
Party	Candidate	Votes	%	±%
Democratic	Mara Candelaria Reardon		100%	
