= Tom Dermody =

American politician

Mayor of La Porte, Indiana
- Incumbent
- Assumed office 2019

Member of the Indiana House of Representatives from the 20th district
- In office November 8, 2006 – November 9, 2016
- Preceded by: Mary Kay Budak
- Succeeded by: Jim Pressel

Personal details
- Party: Republican
- Spouse: Jackie Dermody
- Occupation: Politician

Tom Dermody is an American politician and former member of the Indiana House of Representatives, representing the 20th District from 2006 to 2016. He has served as a board member for LaPorte Community Schools and as a sales representative.

In the 2006 Republican primary, Dermody defeated thirteen term incumbent Mary Kay Budak in the 2006 primary, at least in part due to her support for the Indiana Toll Road lease. Dermody was elected in the 2006 general election. He chose not to run for re-election in 2016.

On May 27, 2018, Dermody announced his candidacy for mayor of LaPorte, Indiana.
