= Julie Olthoff =

American politician

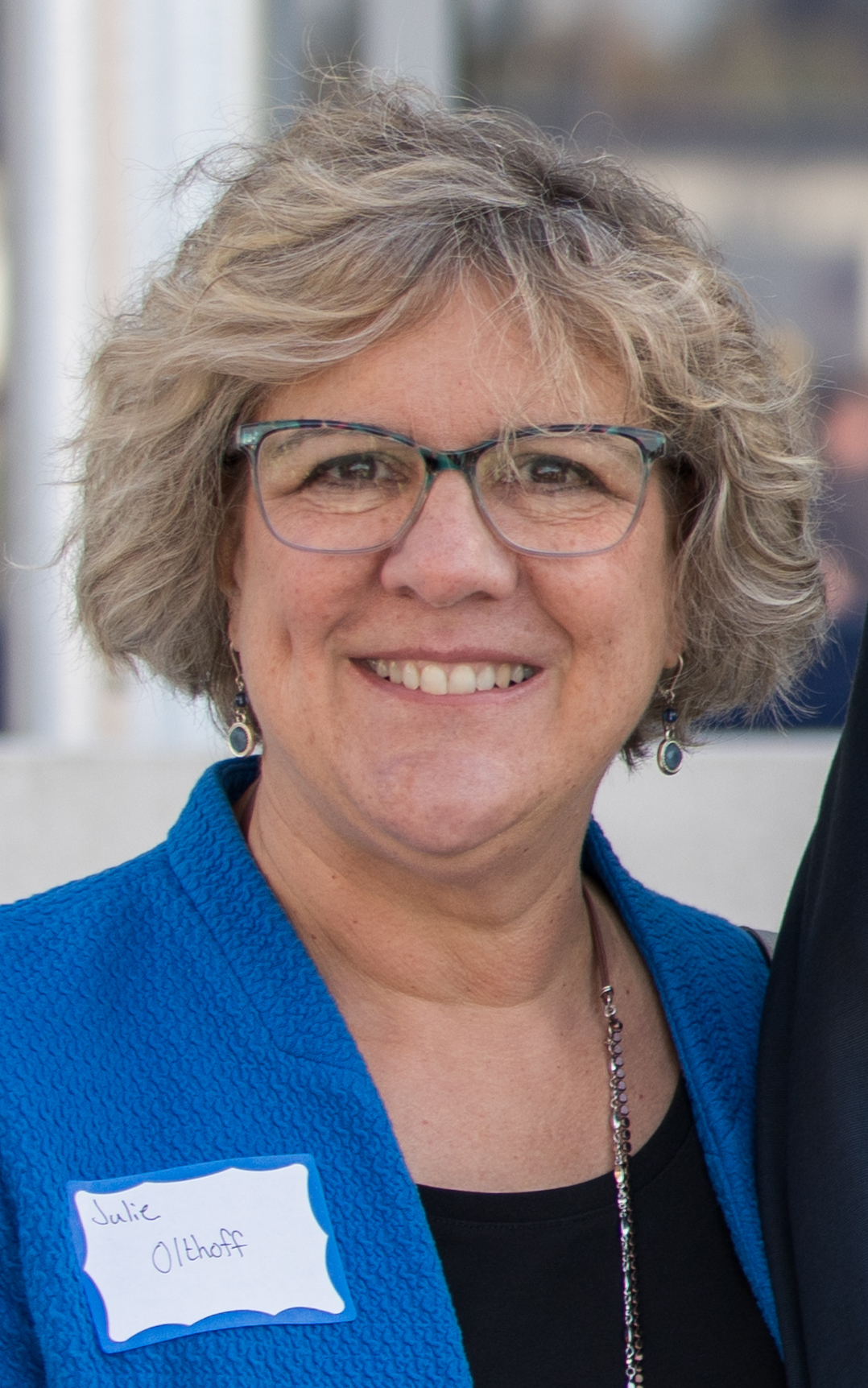

Member of the Indiana House of Representatives from the 19th district
- In office November 18, 2020 – November 4, 2026
- Preceded by: Lisa Beck
- Succeeded by: Nick Neal
- In office November 18, 2014 – November 20, 2018
- Preceded by: Shelli VanDenburgh
- Succeeded by: Lisa Beck

Personal details
- Born: August 1, 1957 (age 69)
- Party: Republican

Julie Olthoff (born August 1, 1957) is an American politician who serves in the Indiana House of Representatives from the 19th district. She first represented this district from 2014 to 2018, and was again elected to represent the district in 2020. She is a Republican.

Olthoff lost reelection to Democrat Nick Neal in the November 3, 2026 general election.

== Elections ==
=== 2014 ===
Indiana House District 19 Republican primary, May 6, 2014
Party	Candidate	Votes	%
Republican	Julie Olthoff	1,314	60.1
Republican	Chris N. Retson	874	39.9
Total votes		2,188	100.0

Indiana House District 19 general election, November 4, 2014
Party	Candidate	Votes	%
Republican	Julie Olthoff	7,146	51.1
Democratic	Shelli VanDenburgh (incumbent)	6,834	48.9
Total votes		13,980	100.0

=== 2016 ===
Indiana House District 19 Republican primary, May 3, 2016
Party	Candidate	Votes	%
Republican	Julie Olthoff (incumbent)	7,571	100.0
Total votes		7,571	100.0

Indiana House District 19 general election, November 8, 2016
Party	Candidate	Votes	%
Republican	Julie Olthoff (incumbent)	15,236	48.5
Democratic	Shelli VanDenburgh	14,895	47.4
Libertarian	Evan J. Demaree	1,288	4.1
Total votes		31,419	100.0

=== 2018 ===
Indiana House District 19 Republican primary, May 8, 2018
Party	Candidate	Votes	%
Republican	Julie Olthoff (incumbent)	3,171	100.0
Total votes		3,171	100.0

Indiana House District 19 general election, November 6, 2018
Party	Candidate	Votes	%
Democratic	Lisa Beck	13,249	50.5
Republican	Julie Olthoff (incumbent)	12,998	49.5
Total votes		26,247	100.0

=== 2020 ===
Indiana House District 19 Republican primary, June 2, 2020
Party	Candidate	Votes	%
Republican	Julie Olthoff	3,619	100.0
Total votes		3,619	100.0

Indiana House District 19 general election, November 3, 2020
Party	Candidate	Votes	%
Republican	Julie Olthoff	19,496	51.8
Democratic	Lisa Beck (incumbent)	18,135	48.2
Total votes		37,631	100.0

=== 2022 ===
Indiana House District 19 Republican primary, May 3, 2022
Party	Candidate	Votes	%
Republican	Julie Olthoff (incumbent)	3,237	100.0
Total votes		3,237	100.0

Indiana House District 19 general election, November 8, 2022
Party	Candidate	Votes	%
Republican	Julie Olthoff (incumbent)	13,662	58.7
Democratic	Lisa Beck	9,605	41.3
Total votes		23,267	100.0

=== 2024 ===
Indiana House District 19 Republican primary, May 7, 2024
Party	Candidate	Votes	%
Republican	Julie Olthoff (incumbent)	3,113	100.0
Total votes		3,113	100.0

Indiana House District 19 general election, November 5, 2024
Party	Candidate	Votes	%
Republican	Julie Olthoff (incumbent, unopposed)	25,348	100.0
Total votes		25,348	100.0

=== 2026 ===
Indiana House District 19 Republican primary, May 5, 2026
Party	Candidate	Votes	%
Republican	Julie Olthoff (incumbent)	3,227	100.0
Total votes		3,227	100.0

Indiana House District 19 general election, November 3, 2026 (unofficial results)
Party	Candidate	Votes	%
Democratic	Nick Neal	12,655	51.3
Republican	Julie Olthoff (incumbent)	12,031	48.7
Total votes		24,686	100.0
