= Cheetham (surname) =

- Language: English

Origin
- Language: English
- Origin: Cheetham, Manchester
- Meaning: "homestead or village by the wood called Chet"

Other names
- Variant forms: Chetham, Cheatham, Chatan, Chitham, Chitson

Cheetham is an English surname, probably derived from Cheetham in Lancashire, now part of Manchester.

Notable people with the surname include:

- Alan Cheetham (born 1928), American paleobiologist
- Alfred Cheetham (1867–1918), member of several Antarctic expeditions
- Anthony Cheetham (born 1946), British materials scientist
- Arthur Cheetham (1864–1937), English film-maker
- Craig Cheetham (born 1970), English actor
- Deborah Cheetham (born 1964), Australian opera singer
- Erika Cheetham (1939–1998), English medieval scholar
- Francis Cheetham (1928–2005), leading authority on Nottingham Alabaster
- Henry Cheetham (1827–1899), Anglican bishop
- Henry Cheetham (pastor) (1801–1881), English Congregational minister in colonial South Australia
- Jack Cheetham (1920–1980), South African cricket player
- Jackie Cheetham (1907–1987), Scottish footballer
- Jason Cheetham (born 1969), English musician (a.k.a. Jay Kay, frontman of Jamiroquai)
- John Cheetham (manufacturer) (1802–1886), English politician
- John Frederick Cheetham (1835–1916), English politician and son of John Cheetham
- Josh Cheetham (born 1992), British speed skater
- Joshua Milne Cheetham (1835–1902), British Member of Parliament
- Michael Cheetham, English footballer
- Sir Milne Cheetham (1869–1938), British diplomat
- Sir Nicolas Cheetham (1910–2002), British diplomat and historical writer
- Richard Cheetham (born 1955), current Anglican Area Bishop of Kingston upon Thames
- Roy Cheetham (1939–2019), English footballer
- Steven Cheetham (born 1987), English cricket player
- Tommy Cheetham (1910–1993), English professional football player

== See also ==
- Chetham
- Cheatham (surname)
- Cheetham (disambiguation)
- Chitham (surname)
- Chittum (surname)
