= Chetham =

- Language: English

Origin
- Language: English
- Origin: Cheetham, Manchester
- Meaning: "homestead or village by the wood called Chet"

Other names
- Variant forms: Cheetham, Cheatham, Chatan, Chitham, Chitson

Chetham is an English surname originating from the place name Cheetham near Manchester, Lancashire. Variants include Cheetham, Cheatham, Chatan, Chitham, and Chitson. One early Chetham family was from Moston, Manchester in the Middle Ages.

== People ==
- Humphrey Chetham (1580–1653), English merchant and philanthropist

== See also ==
- Chetham's Hospital and Library, Manchester, founded by Humphrey Chetham in 1653:
  - Chetham's School of Music
  - Chetham's Library
- Chetham Society
- Cheetham, Manchester
- Cheetham (disambiguation)
- Cheetham (surname)
- Cheatham (disambiguation)
- Cheatham (surname)
- Chitham
