= Cheatham (surname) =

- Language: English

Origin
- Language: English
- Origin: Cheetham, Manchester
- Meaning: "homestead or village by the wood called Chet"

Other names
- Variant forms: Chetham, Cheetham, Chatan, Chitham, Chitson

Cheatham is a surname. Notable people with the surname include:

- Benjamin F. Cheatham (1820–1886), Confederate general and California gold miner
- Boyd M. Cheatham (c. 1838–1876), Tennessee state congressman
- Charles Cheatham Cavanah (1871–1953), United States federal judge
- Dave Cheatham, Democratic member, Indiana House of Representatives (representing 69th District since 2006)
- Doc Cheatham (1905–1997), American jazz trumpeter, singer and bandleader
- Donna Cheatham, American high school girls' basketball coach
- Edward Saunders Cheatham (1818–1878), Tennessee state congressman and senator.
- Eugene Calvin Cheatham Jr. (1915–2005), one of the Tuskegee Airmen and a career officer
- Henry P. Cheatham (1857–1935), African American Republican member, US House of Representatives
- Jack Cheatham (1894 – 1971), American character actor
- Jimmy Cheatham (1924–2007), American jazz trombonist and teacher
- John Cheatham (1855–1918), American firefighter
- Karla Cheatham Mosley (born 1981), American actress
- Kitty Cheatham (1864–1946), American singer and actress
- Kwan Cheatham (born 1995), American basketball player for Ironi Nes Ziona of the Israel Basketball Premier League
- Maree Cheatham (born 1942), American actress
- Oliver Cheatham (1948–2013), American singer
- Owen Robertson Cheatham (1902–1970), American founder of Georgia-Pacific
- Richard Boone Cheatham (1824–1877), mayor of Nashville, Tennessee during the opening years of the Civil War
- Richard Cheatham (1799–1845), American politician who represented Tennessee 's eleventh district
- Teresa Cheatham (born 1957), vocal instructor from Wellington, Alabama who was named Miss Alabama 1978

== See also ==
- Chetham
- Cheetham (surname)
- Chitham (surname)
