= Panarin =

Panarin (masculine, Russian: Панарин) or Panarina (feminine, Russian: Панарина) is a Russian surname. Notable people with the surname include:

- Aleksandr Panarin (born 1987), Russian soccer player
- Artemi Panarin (born 1991), Russian ice hockey player
- Igor Panarin (born 1958), Russian academician, professor, writer, intelligence analyst, and political scientist
- Olga Panarina (born 1985), Belarusian track cyclist
