= Chitham =

- Language: English

Origin
- Language: English
- Origin: Cheetham, Manchester
- Meaning: "homestead or village by the wood called Chet"

Other names
- Variant forms: Chetham, Cheetham, Cheatham, Chatan, Chitson

Chitham is an English surname, a variant of Cheetham, probably derived from Cheetham in Lancashire, now part of Manchester.

== Notable people ==
- Sir Charles Carter Chitham (1886–1972), a British policeman who served mostly in India
- Claire Chitham (born 1978), a New Zealand actress
- Robert Chitham (1935/36–2017), a British architect and writer

== See also ==
- Chetham
- Cheetham (surname)
- Cheatham (surname)
