= Rustication (architecture) =

Masonry technique of texturing

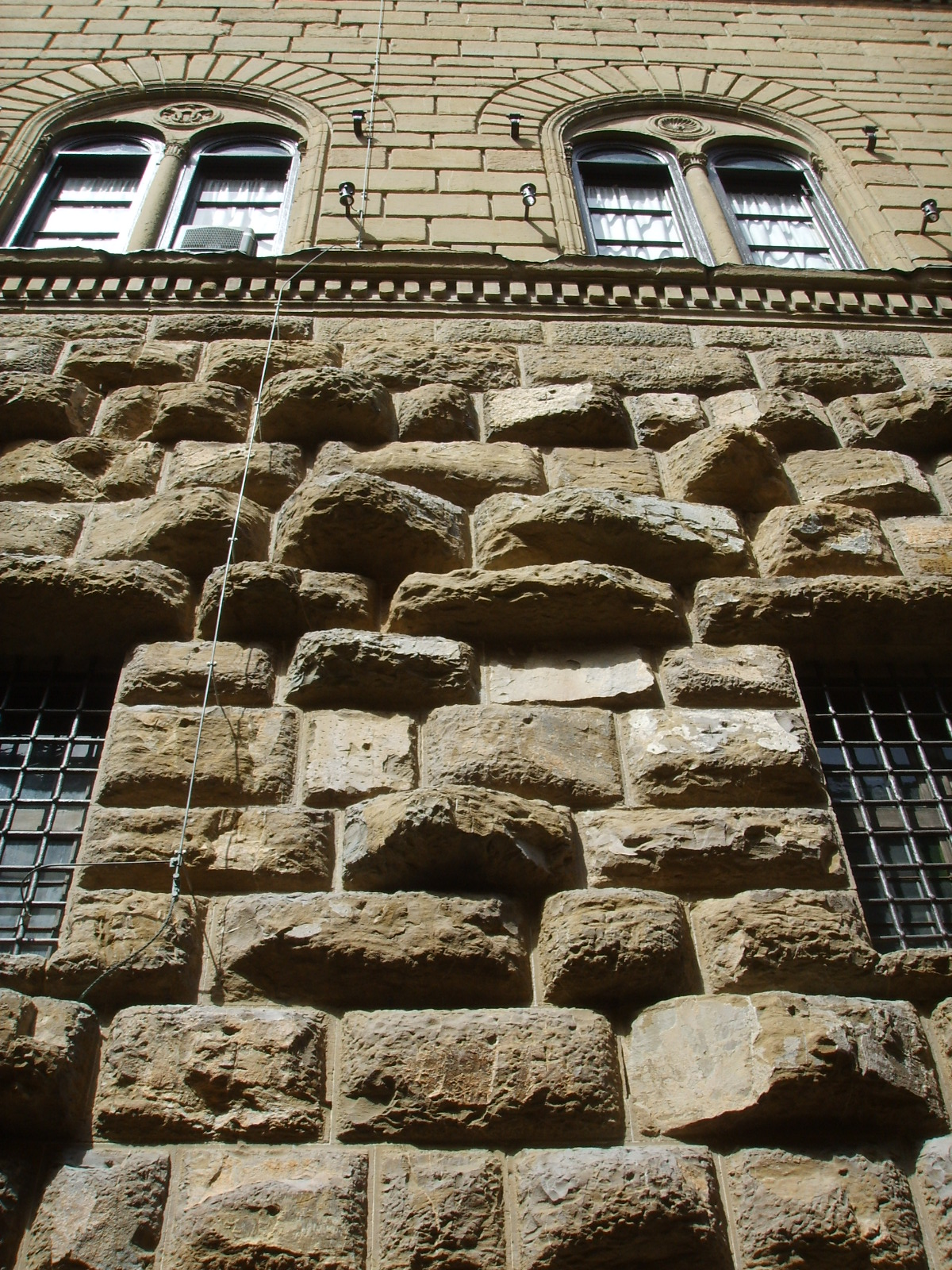
Two different styles of rustication in the Palazzo Medici-Riccardi in Florence; smooth-faced above and rough-faced below

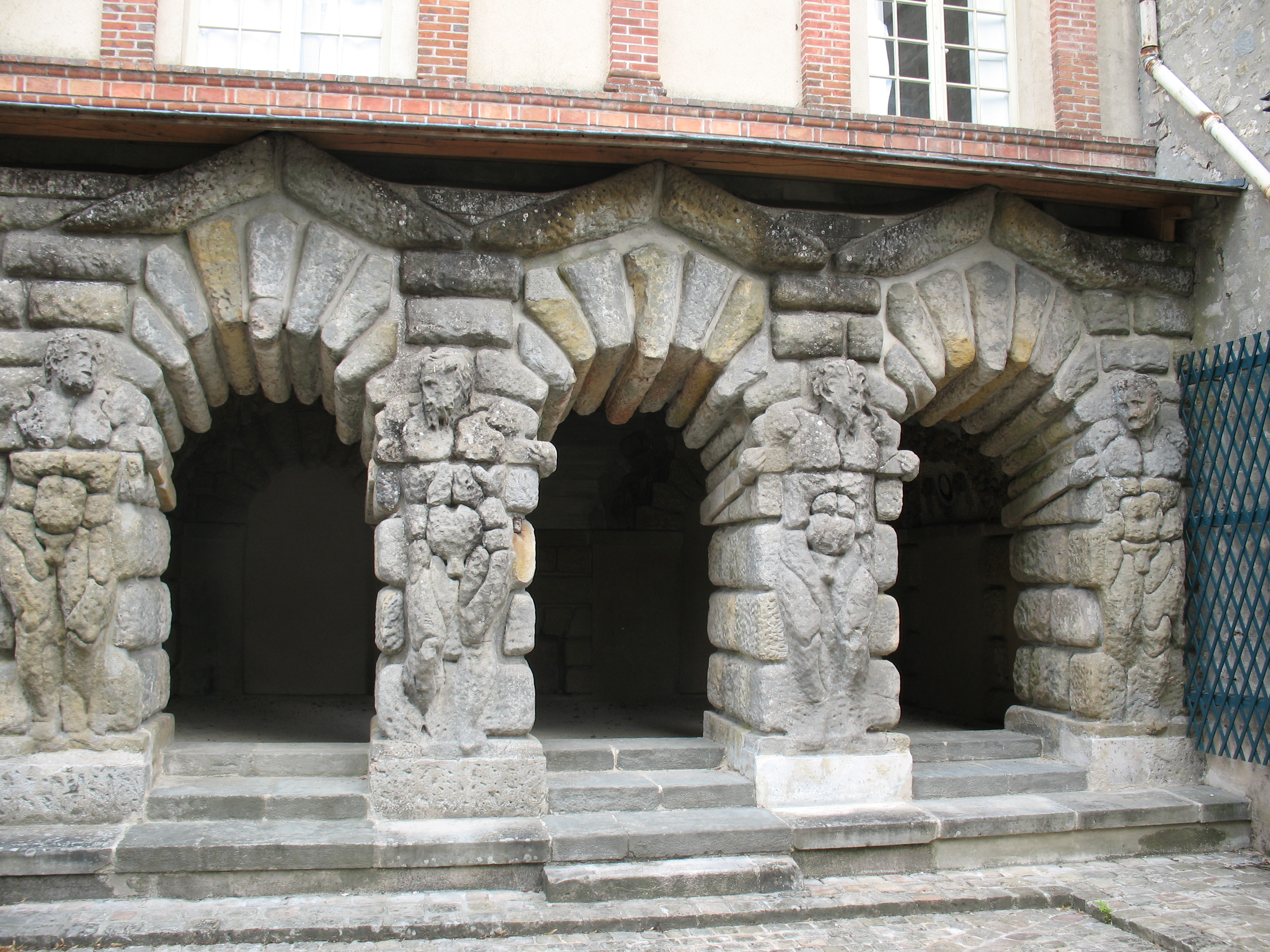
Extreme Mannerist "cyclopian" rustication at the Palace of Fontainebleau

Rustication refers to a range of masonry techniques used in classical architecture giving visible surfaces a finish texture that contrasts with smooth, squared-block masonry called ashlar. The visible face of each individual block is cut back around the edges to make its size and placing very clear. In addition the central part of the face of each block may be given a deliberately rough or patterned surface.

Rusticated masonry is usually "dressed", or squared off neatly, on all sides of the stones except the face that will be visible when the stone is put in place. This is given wide joints that emphasize the edges of each block, by angling the edges ("channel-jointed"), or dropping them back a little. The main part of the exposed face may be worked flat and smooth or left with, or worked, to give a more or less rough or patterned surface. Rustication is often used to give visual weight to the ground floor in contrast to smooth ashlar above. Though intended to convey a "rustic" simplicity, the finish is highly artificial, and the faces of the stones often carefully worked to achieve an appearance of a coarse finish.

Rustication was used in ancient times, but became especially popular in the revived classical styles of Italian Renaissance architecture and that of subsequent periods, particularly in the lower floors of secular buildings. It remains in use in some modern architecture.

Similar finishes are very common in medieval architecture, especially in castles, walls and similar buildings, but here it merely arises from an unwillingness to spend the extra money required for ashlar masonry in a particular building, and lacks the deliberate emphasis on the joints between blocks. Though it often achieves a decorative effect, this is something of a by-product, and the exploitation for architectural effect within a single building of contrasts between rusticated and ashlar surfaces is rarely seen. In some buildings, such as the Palazzo Vecchio in Florence (begun 1298) something other than cost-saving is at play, and this may be the association of the technique with the display of power and strength, from its use in military architecture. Rough finishes on stone are also very common in architecture outside the European tradition, but these too would generally not be called rustication. For example, the bases of Japanese castles and other fortifications usually use rough stone, often very attractively.

== History ==
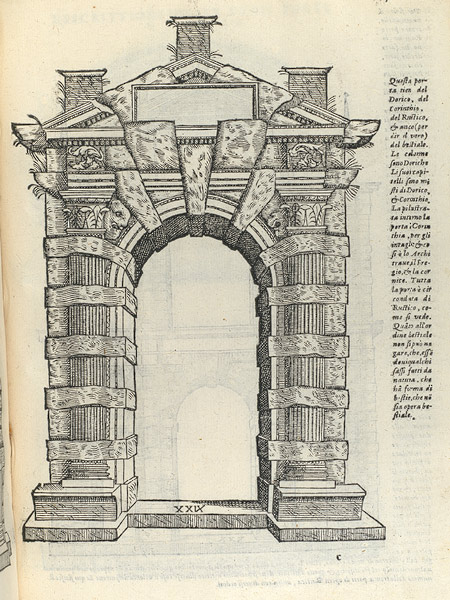
Illustration to Serlio, rusticated doorway of the type now called a Gibbs surround, 1537

Although rustication is known from a few buildings of Greek and Roman antiquity, for example Rome's Porta Maggiore, the method first became popular during the Renaissance, when the stone work of lower floors and sometimes entire facades of buildings were finished in this manner. It was generally used for secular buildings, and has always remained uncommon in churches, perhaps through a lingering association with the architecture of military power; there are exceptions, such as St Giles in the Fields, London (1730–34).

Probably the earliest and most influential example is the Palazzo Medici Riccardi in Florence, built between 1444 and 1484, with two contrasting rusticated finishes. The ground floor has an irregular and genuinely rugged appearance, with a variation in the degree to which parts of the faces of blocks project from the wall that is rarely equalled later. Above, the rustication is merely to emphasize the individual blocks, and the faces are all smooth and even. Also in Florence, Palazzo Strozzi, begun 1489, with large oblong rounded cushions, and the front of the Palazzo Pitti, begun 1458, rusticated their whole facades in the same style. These facades only used the classical orders in mullions and aedicules, with arched forms in rustication the main relief from the massive flat walls. The Palazzo Rucellai, probably of the 1460s, begins to classicize such facades, using smooth-faced rustication throughout, except for the pilasters at each level.

In Rome, Donato Bramante's Palazzo Caprini ("House of Raphael", by 1510, now destroyed) provided a standard model for the integration of rustication with the orders. Here the obvious strength of a blind arched arcade with emphatic voussoirs on the rusticated ground storey (in fact using stucco) gave reassuring support to the upper storey's paired Doric columns standing on rusticated piers, set against a smooth wall. The first major Renaissance building in Spain, the Palace of Charles V in Granada (1527), had a deeply rusticated ground floor facade with regular rounded cushions.

The technique was enthusiastically taken up by the next generation of Mannerist architects, with Giulio Romano in the lead. Most early examples of this "rustic" style are therefore built for sophisticated patrons in the leading centres of taste. Giulio's Palazzo Maccarani Stati in Rome and Palazzo Te in Mantua expand the voussoirs still further, and the courtyard in Mantua plays games with the technique, with some blocks ashlar, other projecting further than the rest, and larger blocks placed higher than smaller ones. The Mannerist architectural writer Sebastiano Serlio and others of his generation enjoyed the play between rusticated and finished architectural elements. In the woodcut of a doorway from Serlio's 1537 treatise, the banded rustication of the wall is carried right across the attached column and the moldings of the doorway surround, binding together all the elements.

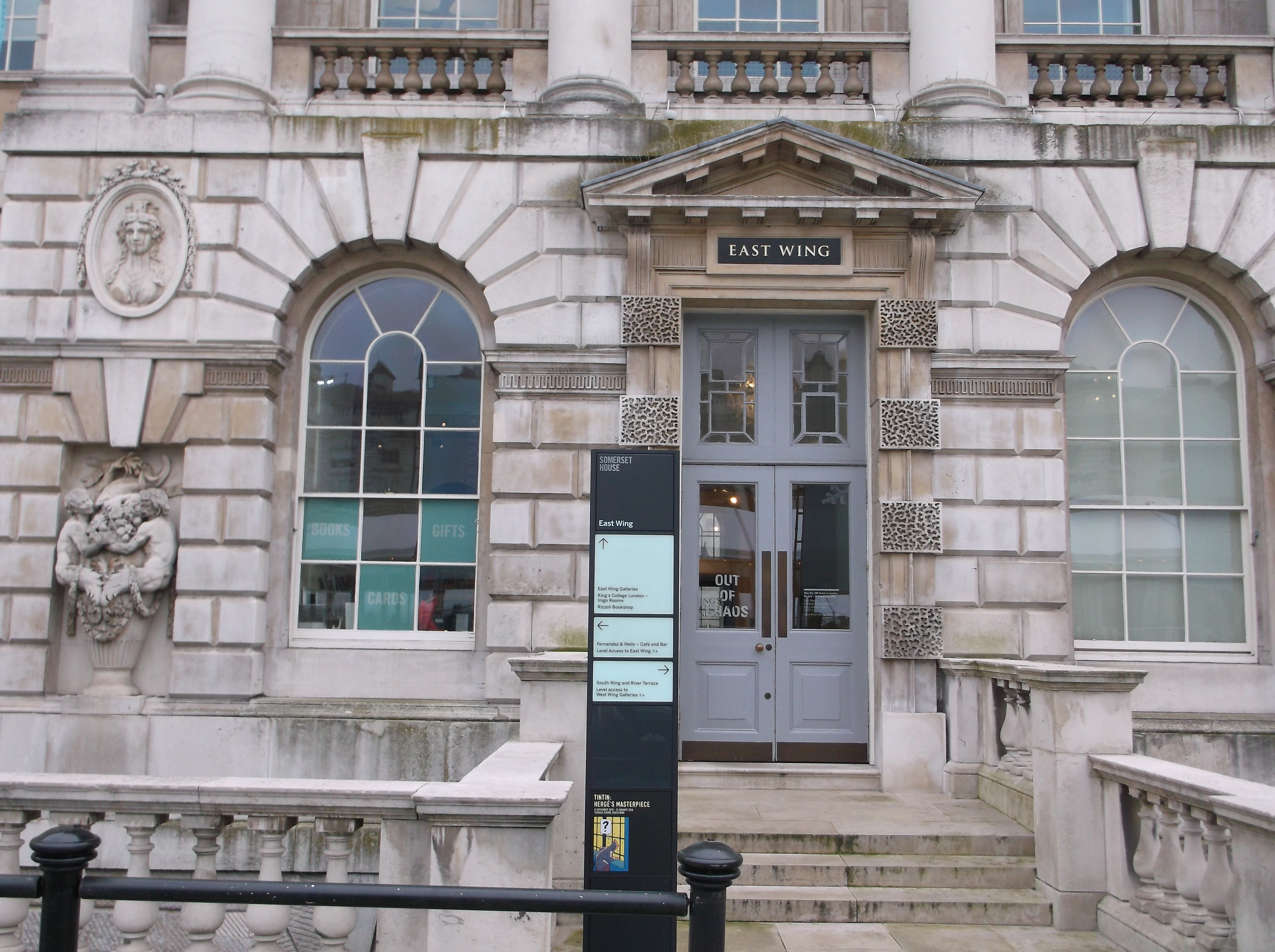
Courtyard of Somerset House in London, mostly smooth-faced "V" joints, but with vermiculated square blocks around the Gibbs surround to the door

The Italians brought in to expand the Palace of Fontainebleau introduced the technique to France. Its spread to Germany and England took longer, but by about the end of the 16th century it had reached all parts of Europe. In his Banqueting House in London (1619), Inigo Jones gave a lightly rusticated surface texture to emphasize the blocks on both storeys, and to unify them behind his orders of pilasters and columns.

During the 18th century, following the Palladian revival, rustication was widely used on the ground floors of large buildings, as its contrived appearance of simplicity and solidity contrasted well to the carved ornamental stonework and columns of the floors above: "Rustication became almost obligatory in all 18th- and 19th-century public buildings in Europe and the USA". A ground floor with rustication, especially in an English mansion such as Kedleston Hall, is sometimes referred to as the "rustic floor", in order to distinguish it from the piano nobile above. As well as uses emphasizing the horizontal, rustication is often used in relatively narrow vertical bands, on the quoins at corners or elsewhere. Rustication may also be confined to the surrounds of arches, doors or windows, especially at the top. In these and other situations where rustication stops horizontally, the edge is usually made up of vertically alternating long and short blocks. Rustication therefore often reverses the patterns of medieval and later vernacular architecture, where roughly dressed wall surfaces often contrast with ashlar quoins and frames to openings.

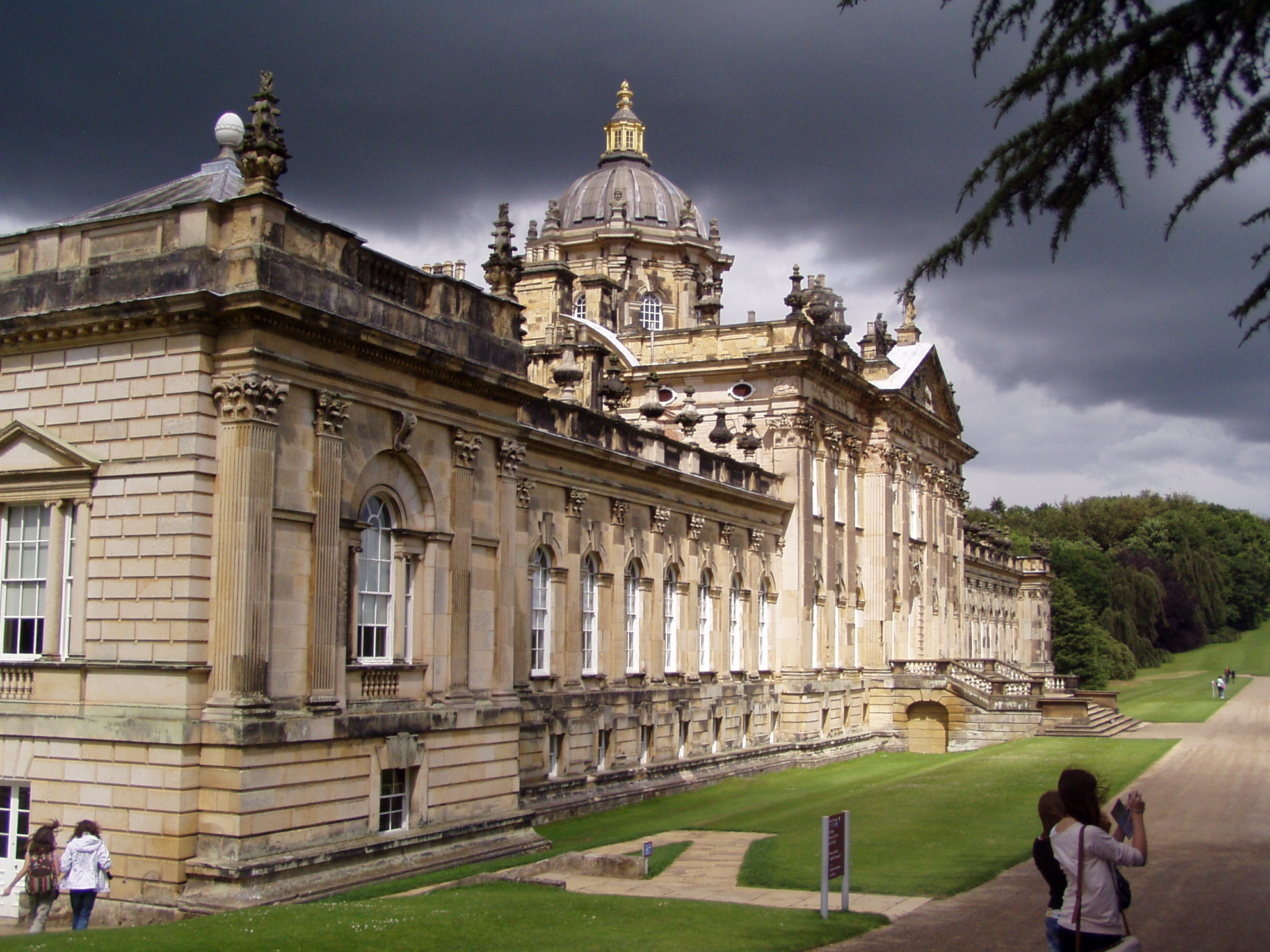
Regular smooth-faced rustication (left) turns to horizontal banded rustication at the corner of Castle Howard in North Yorkshire, England.

Architectural books by authors such as James Gibbs and William Chambers set out detailed recommendations for the proportions of the blocks in relation to columns in the same facade, and the proportion of the block that a widened joint should occupy, though their prescriptions differ, and were not always followed by architects.

Typically, rustication after 1700 is highly regular, with the front faces of blocks flat even when worked in patterns, as opposed to the real unevenness often seen in the 16th-century examples. Often the Palazzo Medici Riccardi model is followed; the ground floor has heavy rustication with textured faces, while above there is smooth-faced "V" rustication. Though such horizontal zones of rustication are the most common, vertical zones can often be used as highlights, as in the illustration from Catania above, or the Cour Napoleon in the Louvre Palace. The Baroque garden front of the Palazzo Pitti achieves a striking effect, not often copied, by using extensive "blocking", both rounded and rectangular, on the shafts of its columns and pilasters.

Canton Viaduct, a blind arcade cavity wall railroad viaduct built in 1834–35 in Canton, Massachusetts, is an example of modest effects of rustication in industrial architecture; the effect is pleasing, and the cost was probably reduced. Massive effects of contrasting rustications typify the "Richardsonian Romanesque" style exemplified in the 1870s and 80s by the American architect H. H. Richardson. The technique is still sometimes used in architecture of a broadly Modernist character, especially in city centre streets where it helps modern buildings blend with older ones with rustication.

Although essentially a technique for stone masonry, rustication can be imitated in brick and stucco, which began as early as Bramante's Palazzo Caprini and was common in smaller houses in Georgian architecture, and also in wood (see below), which is mainly found in British America.

== Variations ==
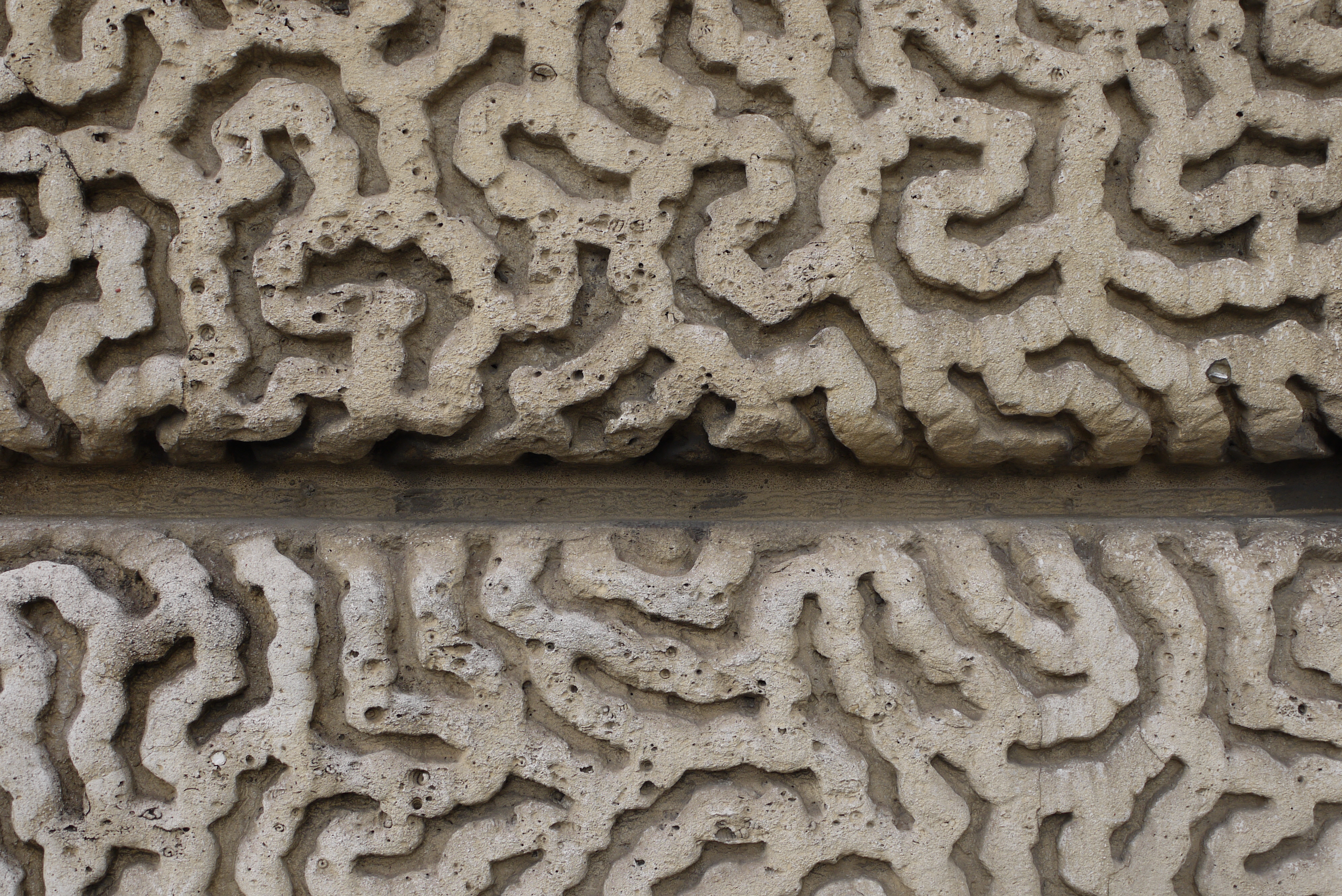
Two adjacent vermiculated blocks showing rather different interpretations of the pattern

The most common variation of rustication is the smooth-faced, where the external face of the block is smooth, as in ashlar, and differs from that only by the cutting in at the joints; this became increasingly popular, and is now the most commonly seen type. If deeply cut-back edges are worked only to the horizontal joints, with the appearance of the vertical joints being minimised, the resulting effect is known as "banded rustication", mostly seen on the lowest levels of very large buildings like the Palace of Versailles or the main Foreign Office building in London. As at Versailles, the bands may be "elbowed", dipping diagonally around arches to join up with and emphasize the voussoirs. Banded rustication is mostly seen with smooth-faced stones, and has remained popular in Stripped Classicism and other contemporary versions of classical styles. In this style, the bands are sometimes several feet apart, making it apparent that stone facings are being used.

When the stone is left with a rough external surface, rough shapes may be drilled or chiselled in the somewhat smoothed face in a technique called "vermiculation" ("vermiculate rustication" or "vermicular rustication"), so called from the Latin vermiculus meaning "little worm", because the shapes resemble worms, worm-casts or worm tracks in mud or wet sand. Carved vermiculation requires a good deal of careful mason's work, and is mostly used over limited areas to highlight them. Disparities between individual blocks are often seen, presumably as different carvers interpreted their patterns slightly differently, or had different levels of skill. The small Turner Mausoleum at Kirkleatham by James Gibbs (1740) has an unusually large area vermiculated, over half of the main level. When the shapes join up to form a network, the style is called "reticulated".

Often, especially from the Baroque onwards, the roughly flattened central areas of stones are indented in regular, but not too regular, patterns called "pecked" or "picked-work", and various other ways of patterning them may be found. In garden architecture, where water was to flow over or near the surface, a vertically oriented pattern evoking hanging pond-weed or algae, or icicles ("frost-work") is sometimes used. Also associated with gardens is "cyclopian" rustication, where the blocks are very large and irregular, as though placed by giants, and "rock-work", where surfaces are built up of rough rocks not placed in regular courses at all. This last goes beyond rustication, and is found in fountains and follies, and later rockeries for planting.

In "prismatic rustication" the blocks are dressed at an angle near each edge, giving a prism-like shape. Where the faces rise to a single point, this is often known by terms using "diamond", and is covered below. They may also, usually in blocks that are oblong rather than square, rise to a ridge in the centre. Both types are illustrated, with several others, by Serlio.

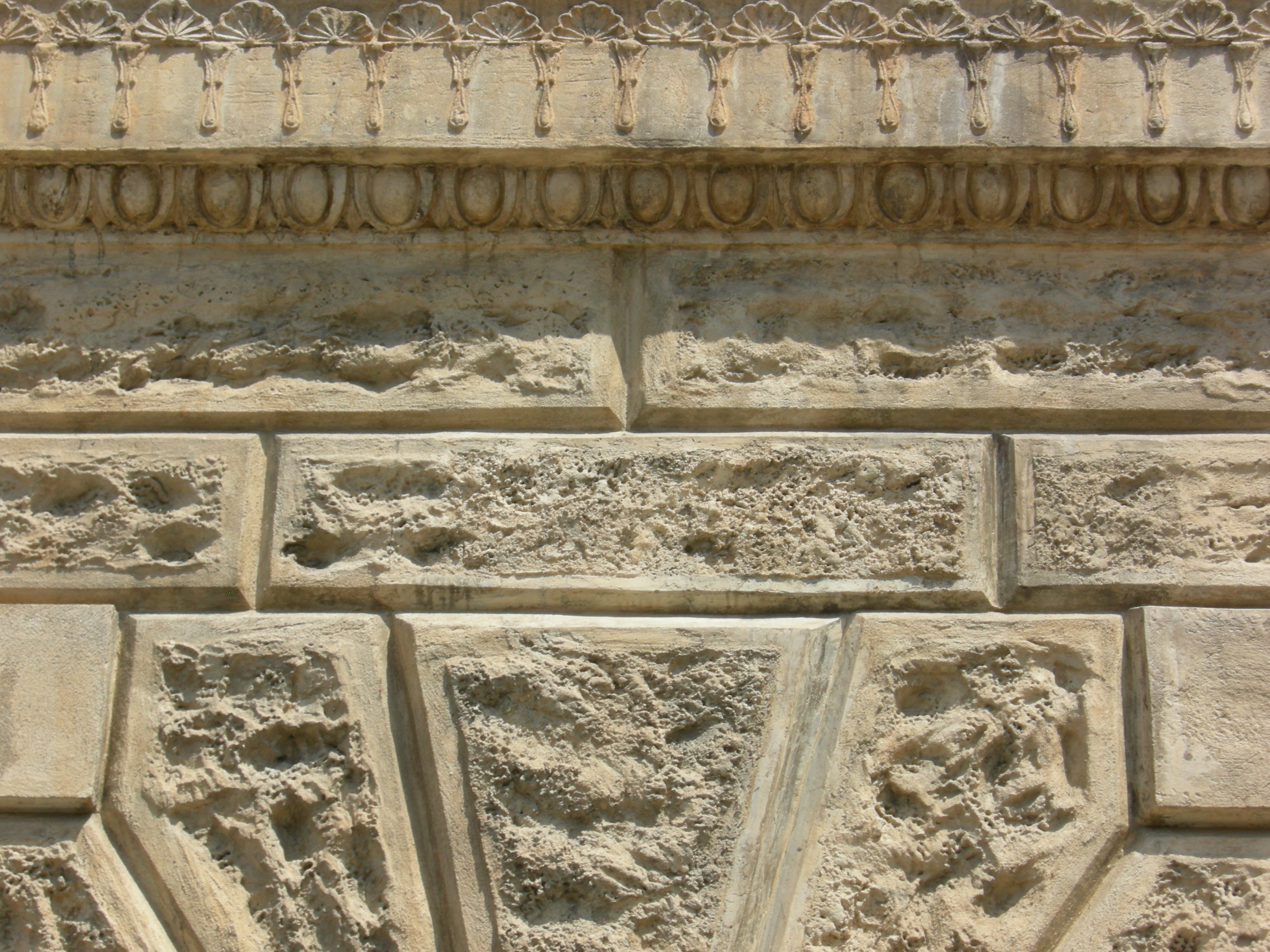
"V" joints and roughened faces within a flat margin, Giulio Romano for his house in Mantua

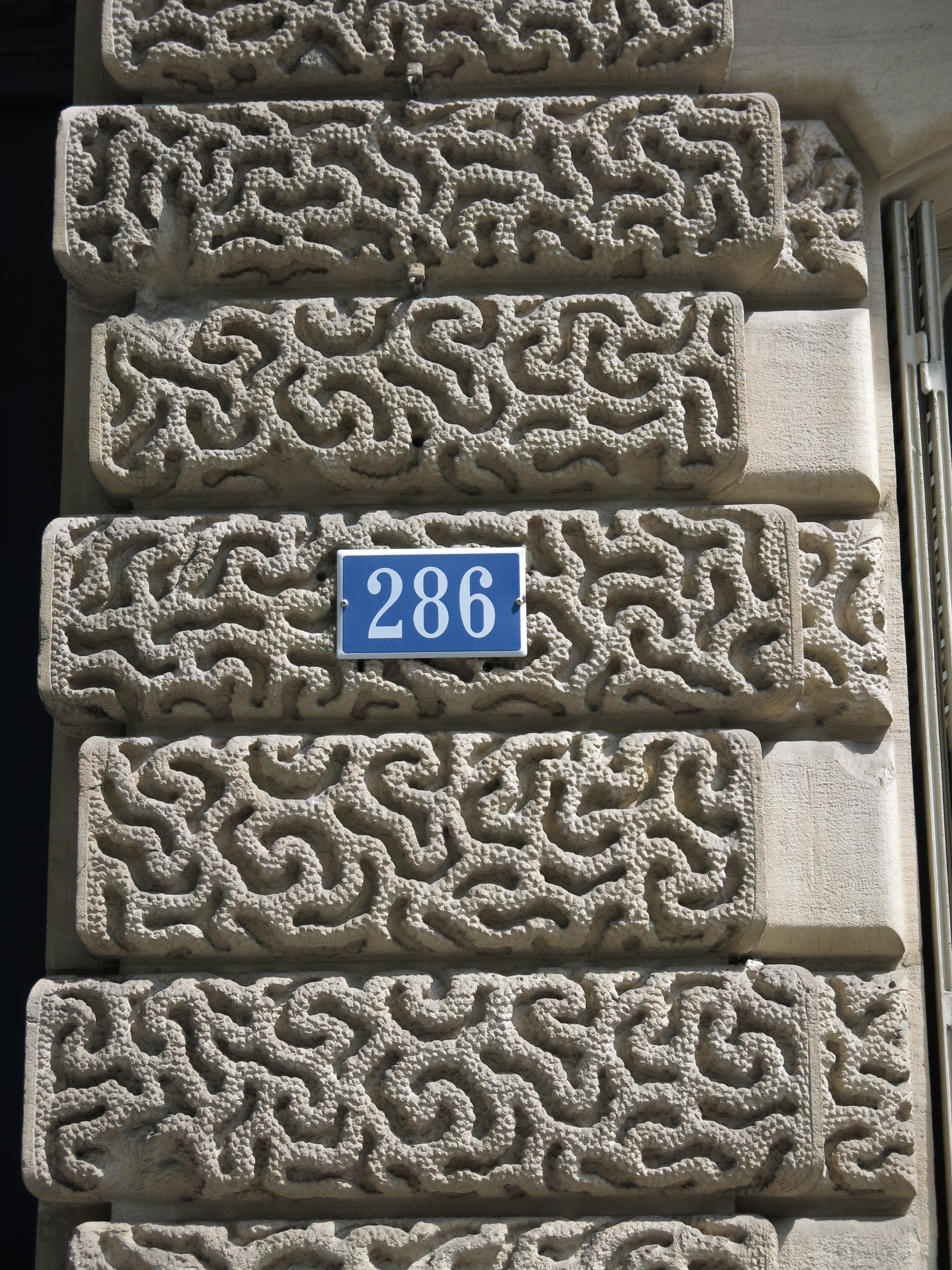
Vermiculation at 286 Boulevard Saint-Germain, Paris

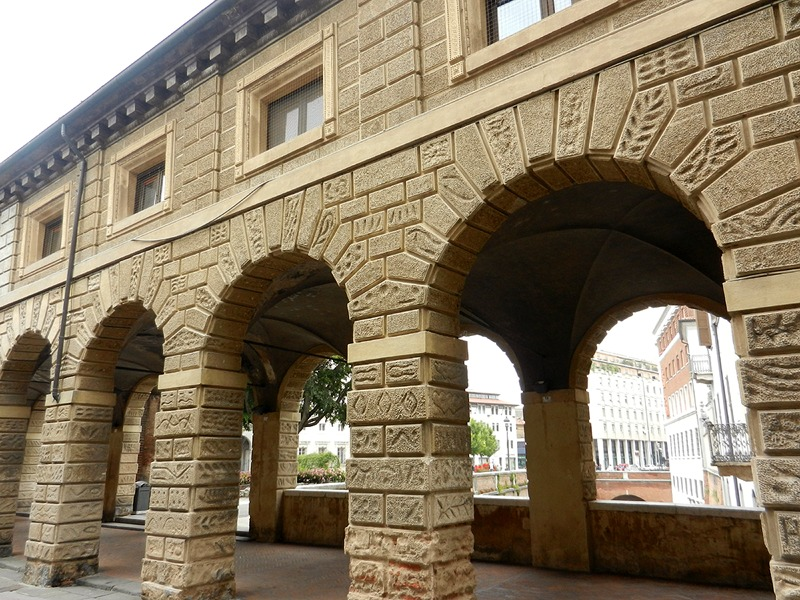
An unusual pattern book of effects in the Loggia di Giulio Romano in Mantua

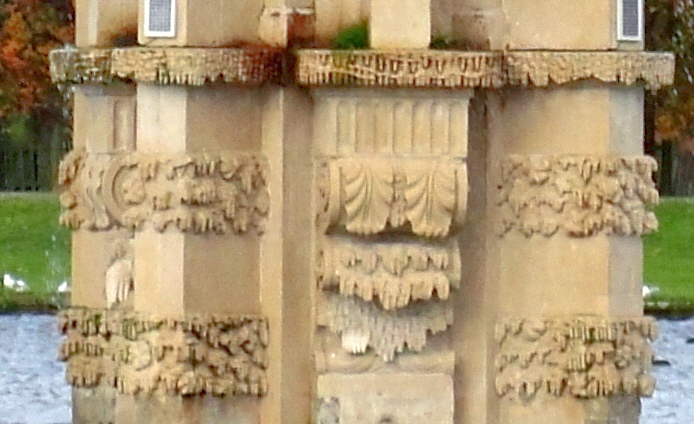
"Frost-work" on the Diana Fountain, London, c. 1690

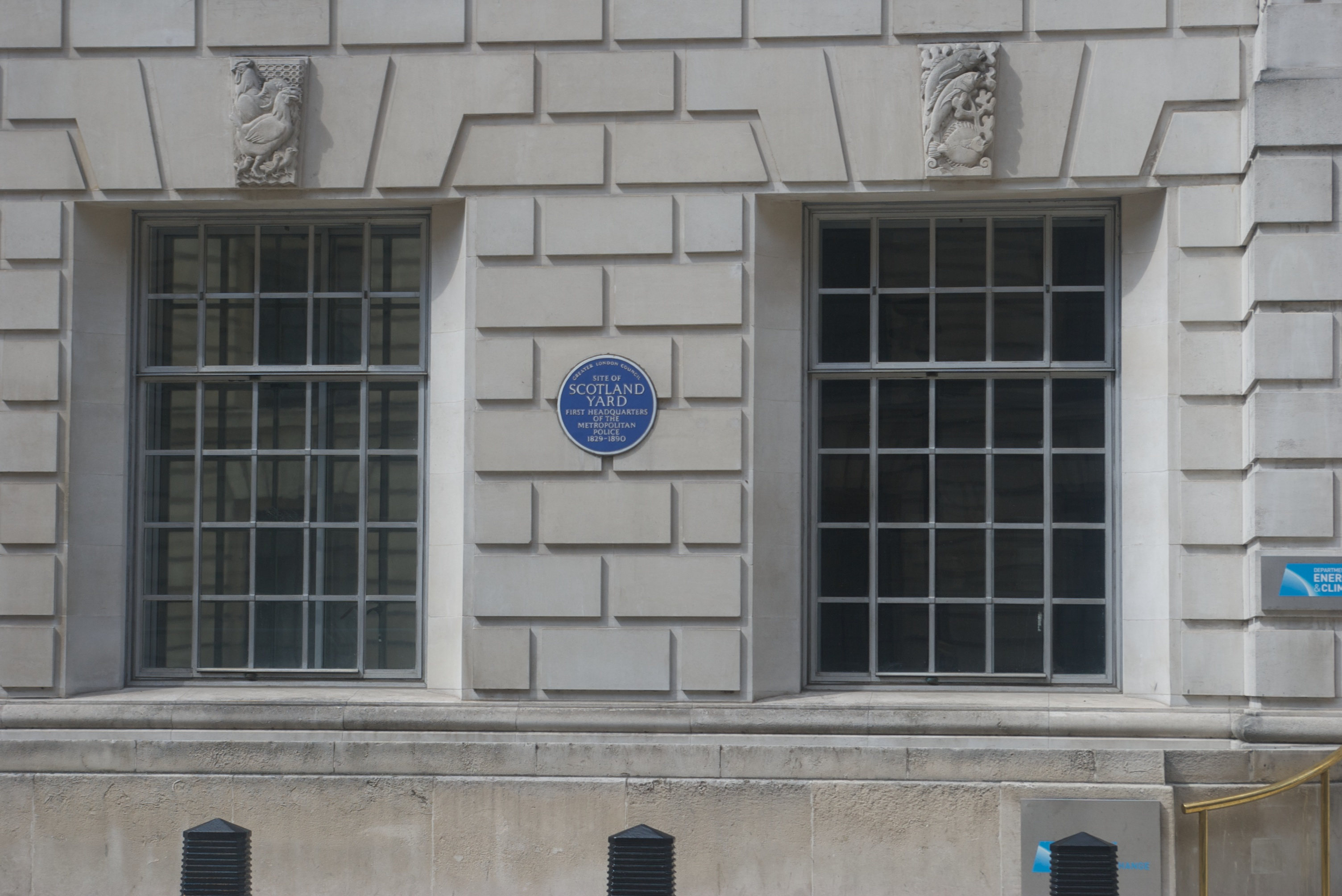
Smooth-faced rustication with the blocks dropping back to the wall at 90°, rather than a "V" chamfer

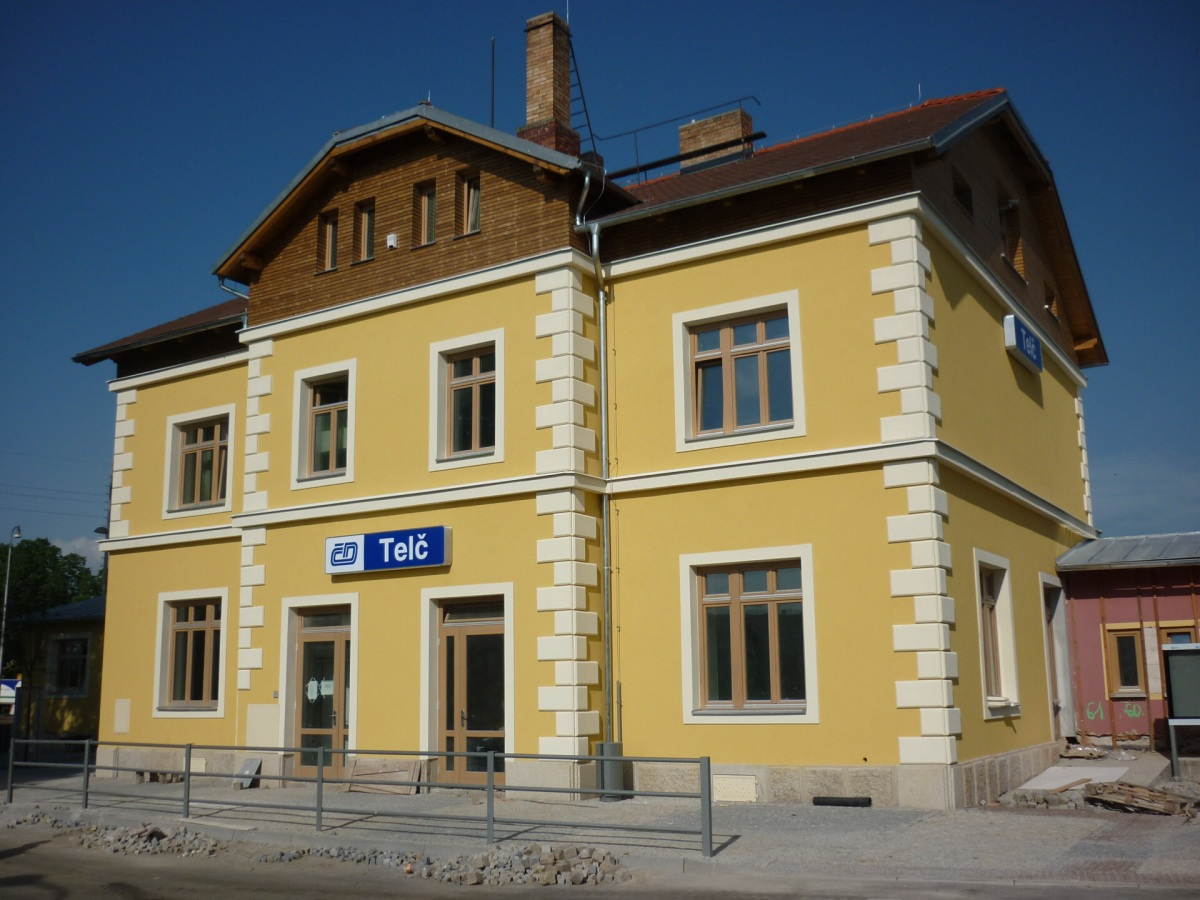
Quoins only, with long and short strips, on a Czech railway station

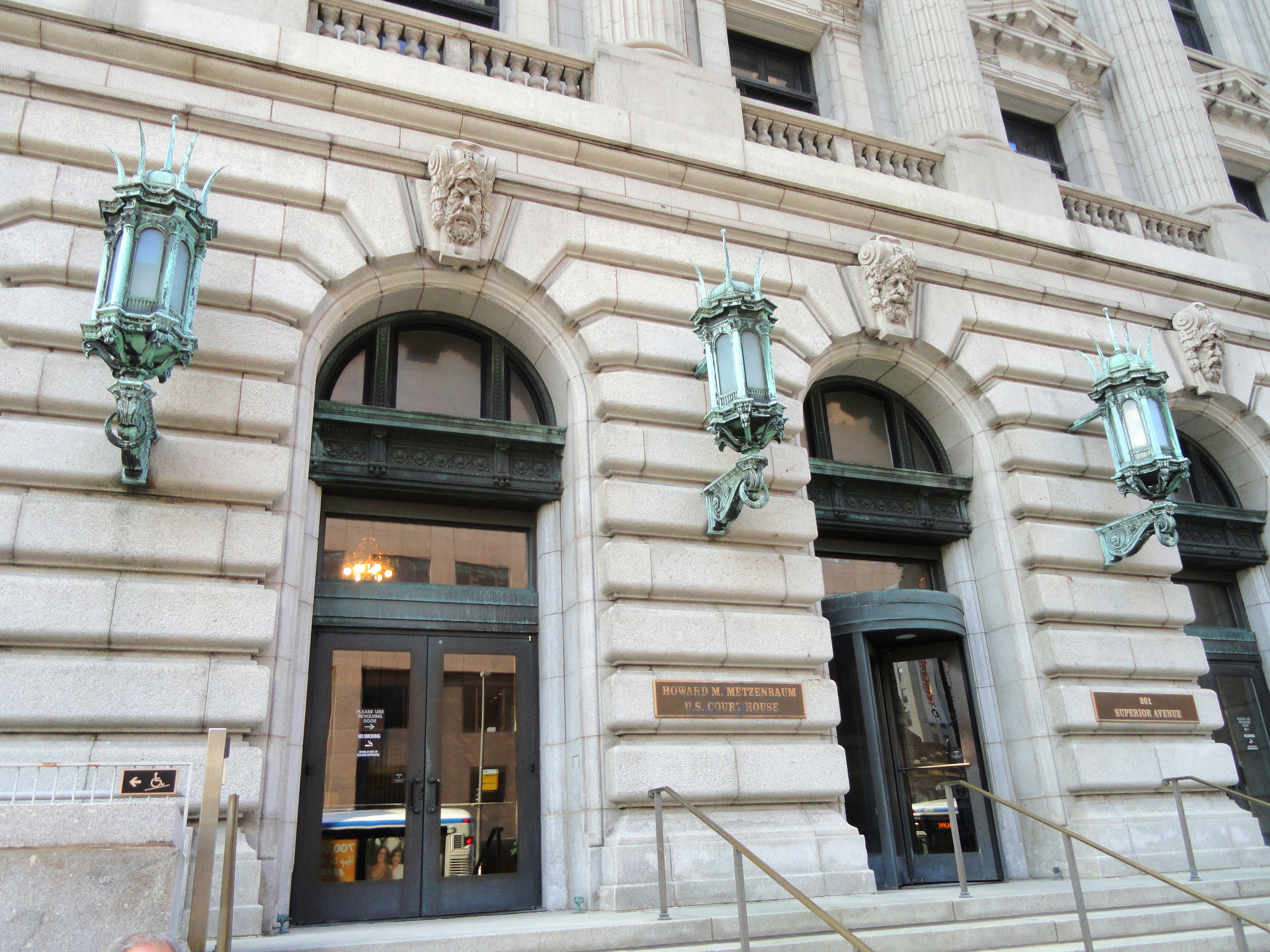
Banded, with "elbows" and very wide joints, Cleveland, Ohio

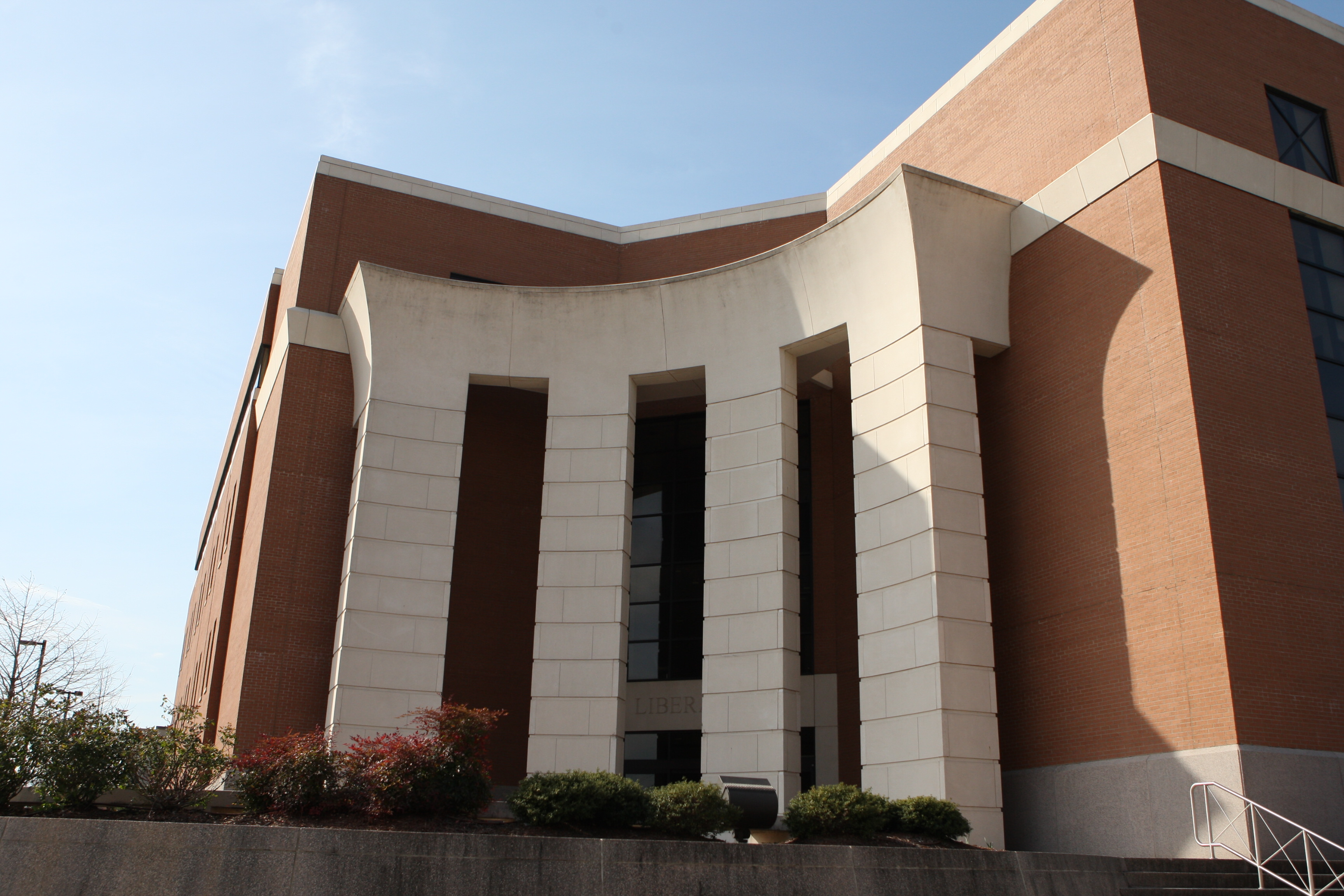
Banded rustication in a wholly modern context, Hattiesburg, Mississippi

=== Diamond rustication ===
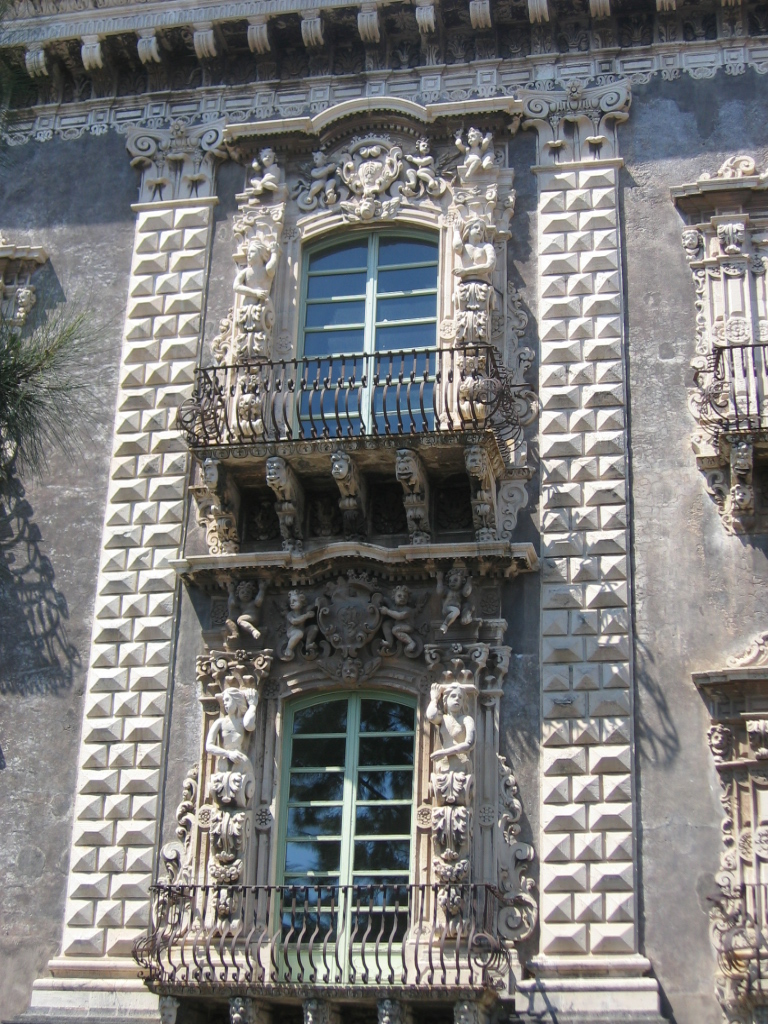
Sicilian Baroque pilasters with two types of prismatic rustication against a smooth background at the University of Catania

Various types of other patterns in masonry surfaces are sometimes called rustication. These include "diamond point" or "diamond rustication" where the face of each stone is a low pyramid facing out. This covered the whole facade of the Palazzo dei Diamanti in Ferrara, completed in 1503, and most of that of the Palace of Facets in the Moscow Kremlin, designed by Italians and completed in 1492, with rectangular "diamonds". These "diamond palaces" influenced other whole walls of diamonds at Casa dos Bicos in Portugal (after 1523, alternate stones only), and Crichton Castle in Scotland (c. 1585; all stones, with flat edges between pyramids).

The round towers at the Castello Sforzesco in Milan almost use diamonds, but their points are smoothed over. The illustration at right, from Catania in Sicily, alternates rows of three square "diamond" blocks with two oblong blocks, where the faces rise to a ridge rather than a point, showing both the main forms of "prismatic rustication".

The sharply pointed styles have really nothing to do with classical rustication, and are instead a development of styles of raised decoration of masonry that were popular in late Gothic architecture, especially the Iberian Manueline (or Portuguese late Gothic) and its equivalent in Spain, known as Isabelline Gothic. When not figurative these are known as bossage. These are probably a development of Mudéjar styles of patterning walls. In the spectacular late-15th-century gateway to the Palacio de Jabalquinto in Baeza, Andalucia, small widely spaced pyramids cover one of the many zones with fancy carved elements, projecting from a wall otherwise in ashlar.

Later, in Baroque architecture, relatively small areas of diamond rustication were reintegrated into architecture in the classical tradition, and were popular as highlights, especially in Sicily and southern Italy and Eastern and Central Europe. The large Černín Palace in Prague (1660s) repeats the Kremlin formula of a broad zone of diamonds across the middle height of the facade, though like the towers in Milan these do not come to a point.

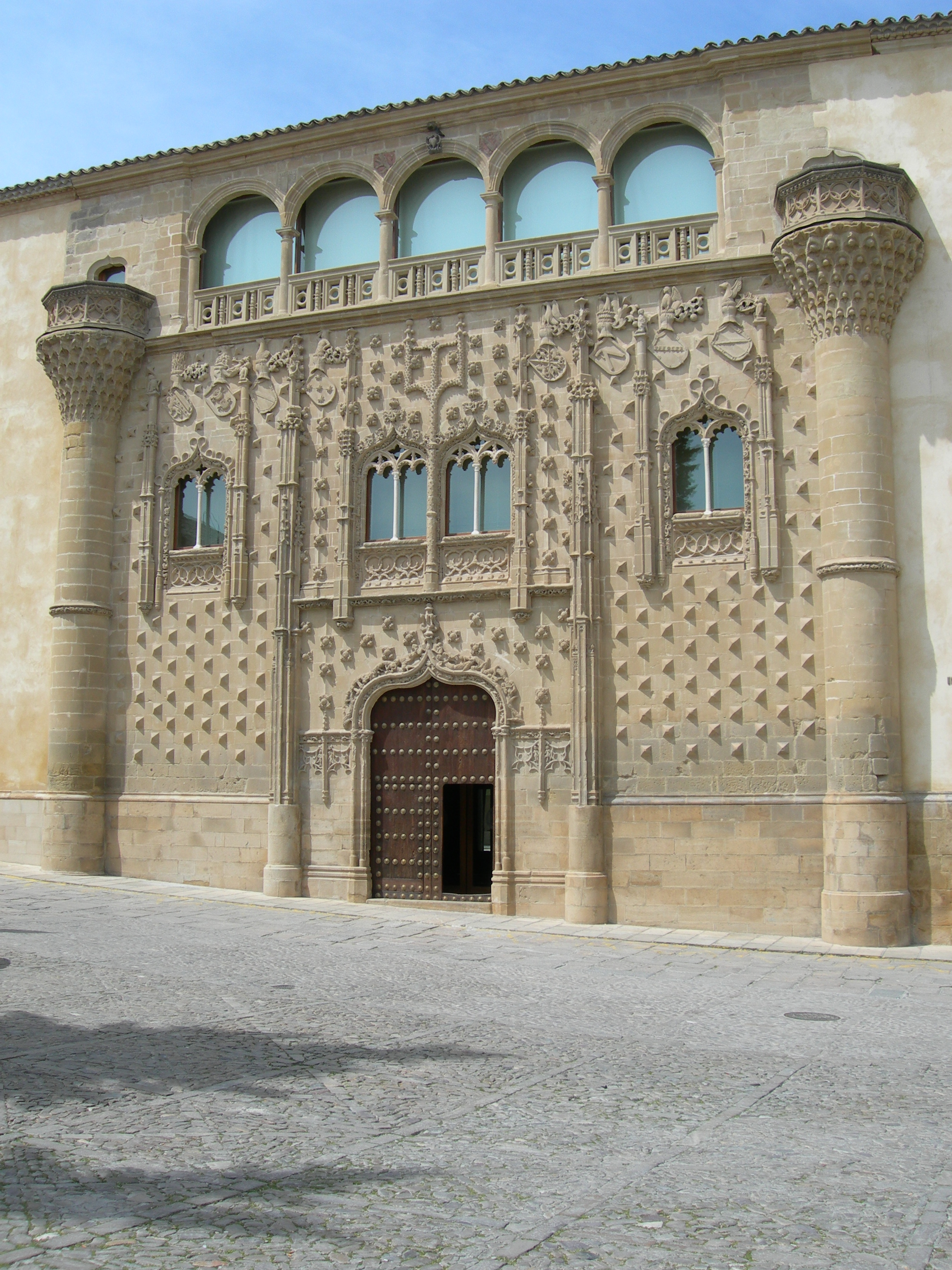
Late-15th-century gateway to the Palacio de Jabalquinto, with small "diamonds" erupting from ashlar at the sides

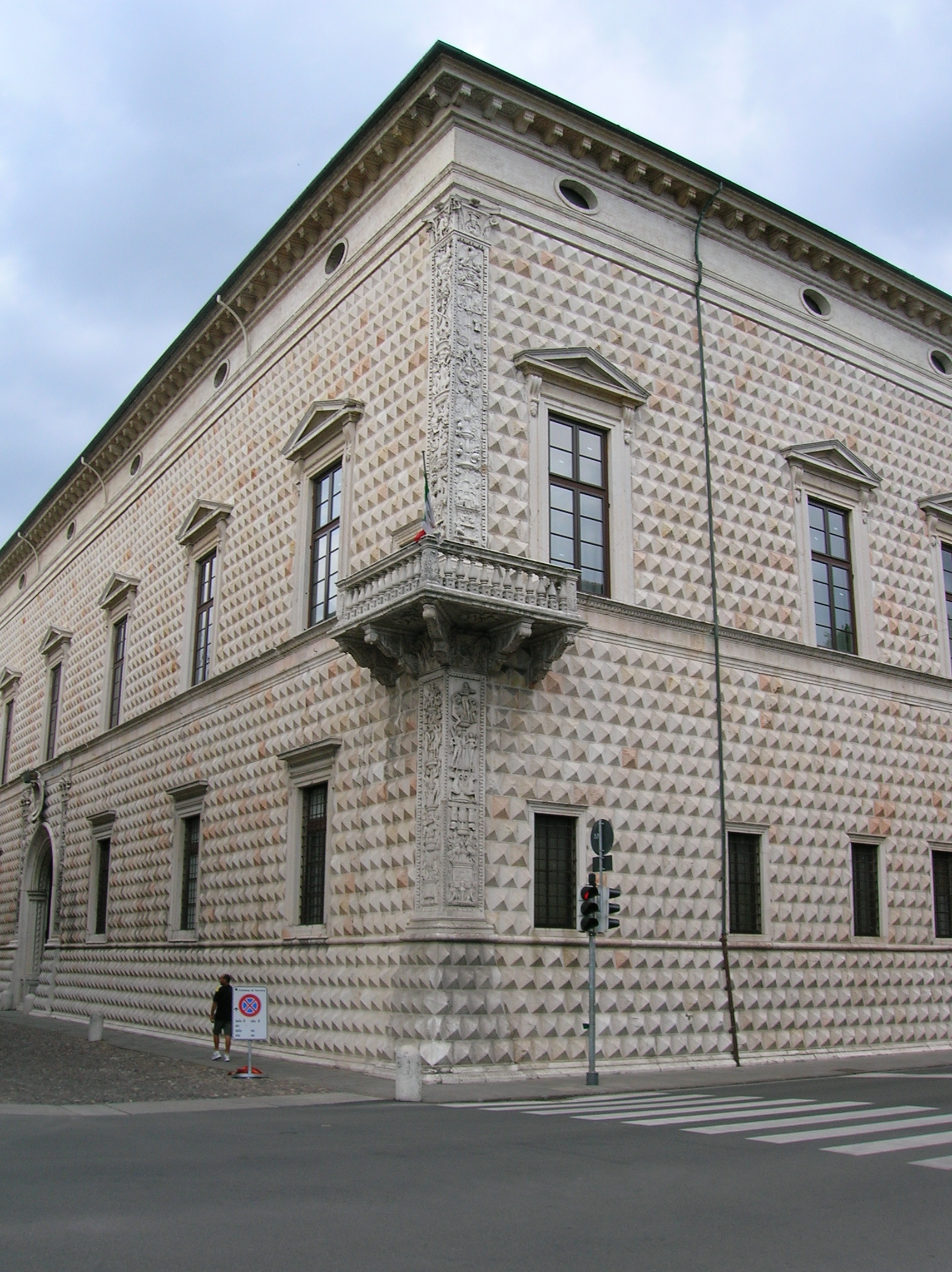
Palazzo dei Diamanti, Ferrara

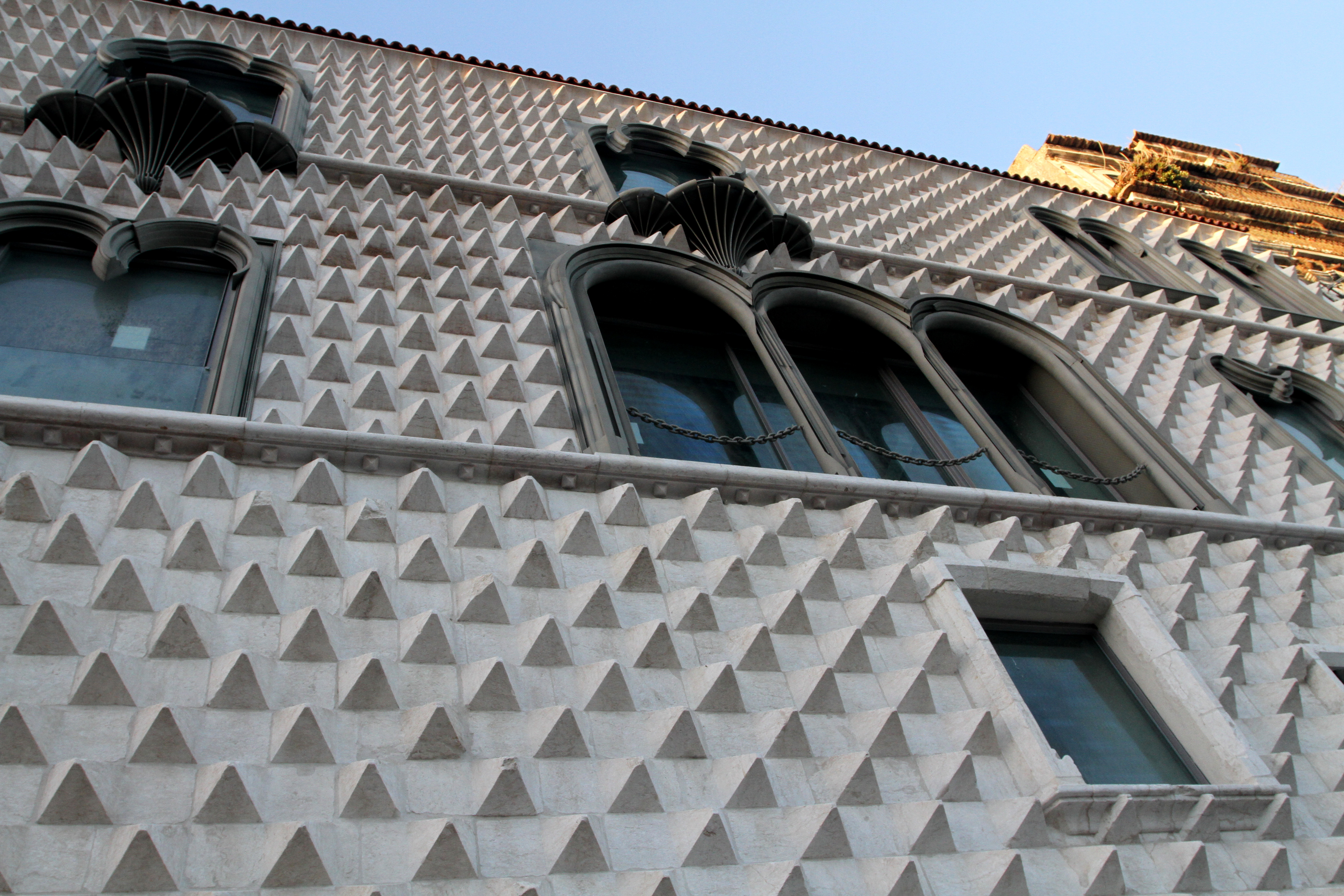
Casa dos Bicos, Lisbon

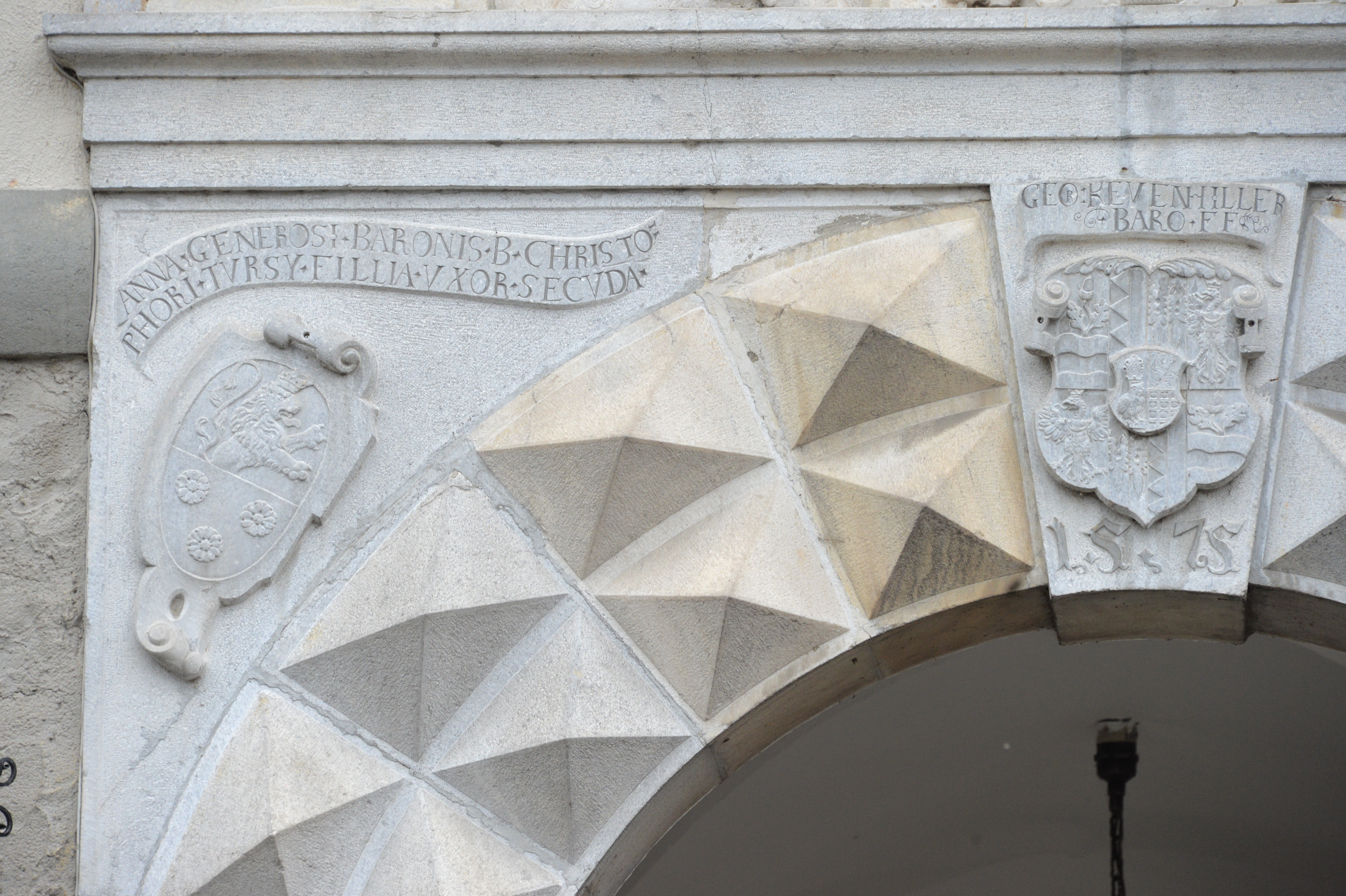
"Diamond rustication" in Wernberg, Austria

== Feigned rustication ==
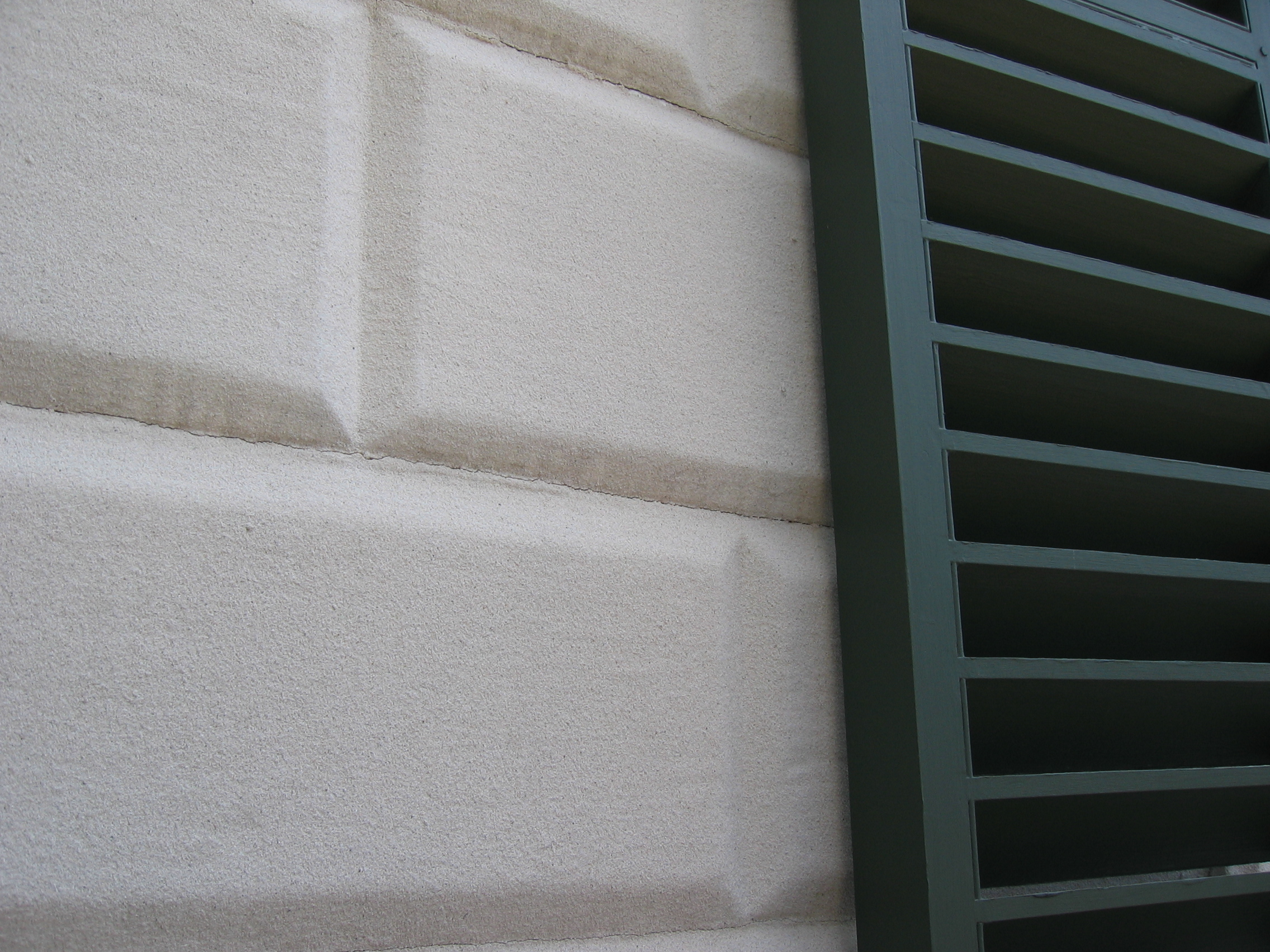
Simple smooth-faced rustication in wood at Mount Vernon; an imitation of European style popular in America

The appearance of rustication, creating a rough, unfinished stone-like surface, can be worked on a wooden exterior. This process became popular in 18th century New England to translate the features of Palladian architecture to the house-carpenter's idiom: in Virginia Monticello and Mount Vernon both made use of this technique. Mount Vernon in particular makes extensive use of feigned rustication and sanded paint and the original finished surfaces of several original planks still survive.

Rustication of a wooden exterior consists of three basic steps. First, the wood is cut, sanded and prepared with beveled grooves that make each plank appear as if it were a series of stone blocks. Second, the wood is painted with a thick coat of paint. Third, while the paint is still wet, sand is thrown or air blasted onto the planks until no more sand will stick. After the paint dries the plank is ready for use.

In Central Europe, especially the Czech Republic, feigned rustication in sgraffito (decoration by scraping away one colour of coating on an exterior to show another beneath) is a feature from the late Renaissance onwards, continuing into the 20th century. Often "prismatic" or "diamond" rustication is imitated.

== See also ==
- Bossage: uncut stone is laid in place with outward projection, which is later carved into shape.
- Bossed masonry, ancient technique where ashlars have a protruding central surface (the "boss") surrounded by smooth, sunken margins
- Rusticated concrete block

== General and cited references ==
- Chitham, Robert, The Classical Orders of Architecture, 2005 rev. ed., Elsevier/Architectural Press. ISBN 9780750661249.
- McKay, William Barr, McKay's Building Construction, 2015 (reprint), Routledge, ISBN 1317341090, 9781317341093.
- Summerson, John, The Classical Language of Architecture, 1980 edition, Thames and Hudson World of Art series, ISBN 0500201773
- Woodman, Francis; and Jacques Heyman, "Masonry, ii) Rustication and Vermiculation" (subscription required), Grove Art Online, Oxford Art Online, Oxford University Press, accessed 2 Apr. 2016.
