= Cheatham =

Cheatham may refer to:

- Cheatham County, Tennessee, a county located in the U.S. state of Tennessee
- Cheatham Middle School, a middle school in the Clarksville Independent School District, Texas, United States
- Cheatham (surname)

== See also ==
- Cheetham (disambiguation)
