= Igor Panarin =

Russian professor and political scientist (born 1958)

- Игорь Панарин
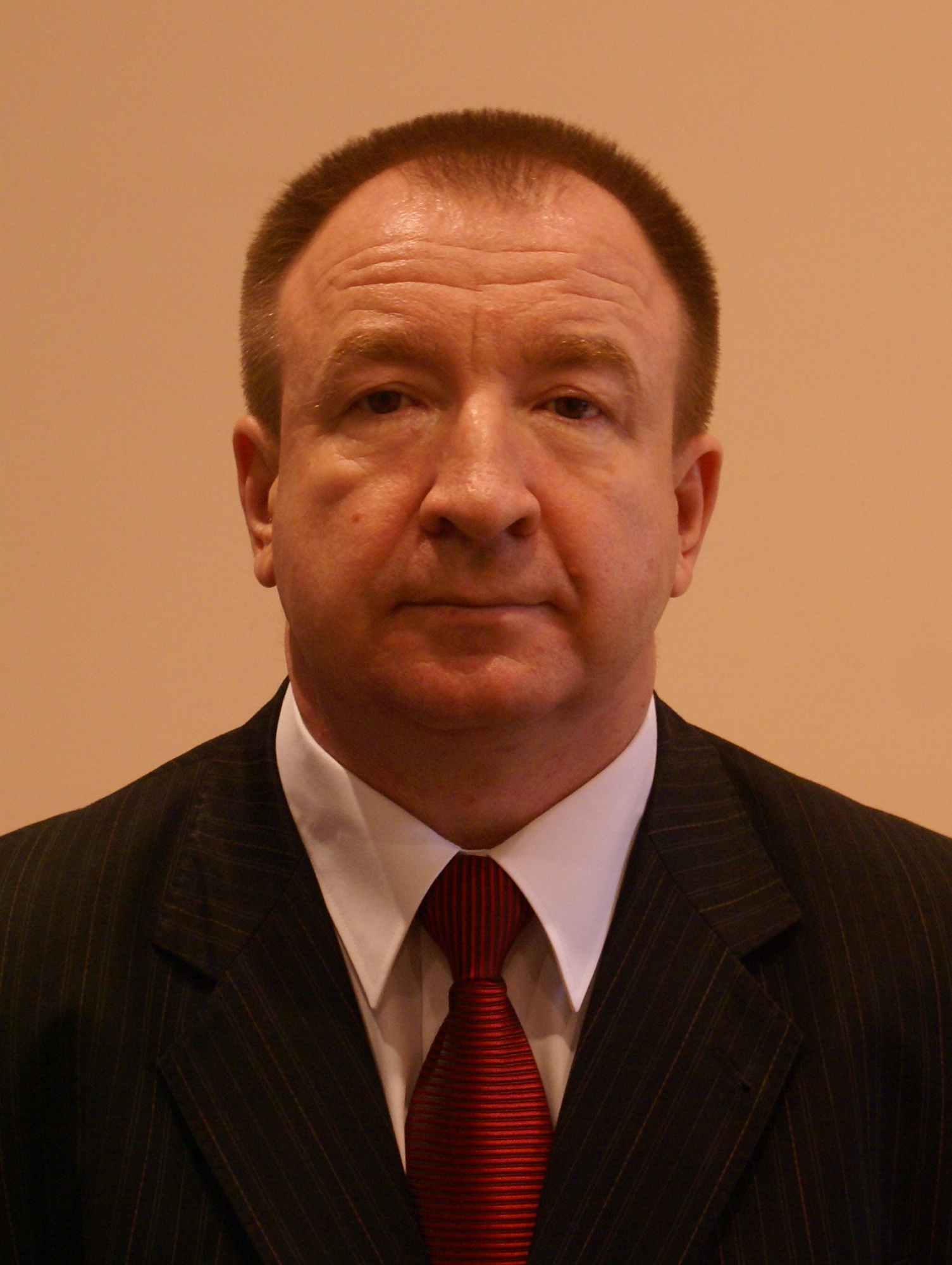
- Panarin in 2009
- Born: Igor Nikolaevich Panarin; 30 October 1958 (age 68)
- Occupations: Professor and political scientist
- Known for: Predicting in 1998 that the United States will possibly disintegrate into six parts in 2010
- Website: www.panarin.com

Igor Nikolaevich Panarin (Russian: И́горь Никола́евич Пана́рин [ˈiɡərʲ nʲɪkɐˈlajɪvʲɪtɕ pɐˈnarʲɪn]; born 30 October 1958) is a Russian professor and political scientist. He is best known for predicting in 1998 that the United States would disintegrate by 2010. After the date came and went his claim was criticised.

Igor Panarin has written 15 books and a number of articles on information warfare, psychology, and geopolitics. Panarin has his own weekly radio programme.

He has led electoral campaigns in Russia and abroad, and his students have included parliamentary deputies, regional leaders, Kremlin officials, and Foreign Ministry spokespeople.

== Biography ==
Panarin graduated from the Higher Military Command School of Telecommunications of the KGB (now the Academy of Federal Security Guard Service of the Russian Federation) in Oryol and the Division of Psychology of the Lenin Military-Political Academy (with a gold medal). In 1993 he defended his thesis for Candidate of Psychological Sciences, titled Psychological Factors of the Officer's Activity in Conditions of Innovations. His Doctorate in Political Sciences was awarded by the Russian Academy of Public Administration in 1997 for a thesis titled Informational-Psychological Support of the National Security of Russia.

Panarin began his career in the KGB of the Soviet Union in 1976. After 1991, he worked in the FAPSI, then the Russian equivalent of the U.S. National Security Agency, reaching the Colonel rank. His field of activity was strategic analysis and integration of closed and open information streams, information stream management in crisis situations, and situation modelling of global processes. He did strategic forecasts for the then President Boris Yeltsin. From 1999 to 2003, he worked as the Head of the Analytical Division of the Central Election Commission of Russia. From 2006 to 2007, Panarin was the Press Secretary of the Russian Federal Space Agency (Roscosmos).

Prof. Panarin started his teaching career in 1989 and has taught in the Moscow State University (MGU), the Moscow State Institute of International Relations (MGIMO-University), the Russian Academy of Public Administration, and the Diplomatic Academy of the Ministry of Foreign Affairs of Russia, where he has worked since 1999.

As of 2009, Panarin is the dean of the Russian Foreign Ministry's school for future diplomats and appears regularly on Russian television channels.

== Views and ideas ==
Panarin criticises Vladimir Lenin and Leon Trotsky but recognizes Joseph Stalin for realizing a geopolitical project of his own – a synthesised historical Russian geopolitical idea of Joseph Volotsky, Philotheus, Nikolay Danilevsky and Konstantin Leontiev. In his view, after 1934 (when Sergey Kirov was assassinated) Stalin started a process of recreation of the Rus doctrine "Moscow – a Third Rome" in new historical conditions.

On Panarin's initiative, an action called a Public Tribunal against Gorbachev for the downfall of the USSR and crimes against its peoples was carried out at the web portal KM.ru from 2 to 22 December 2005, resulting in 56,298 people condemning Gorbachev.

Panarin opposes the Houston programme of 1990 and criticises the Russian finance minister Alexey Kudrin for following it, saying the 2008 financial crisis in Russia is a part of it. He recommends selling oil and gas to Ukraine only for roubles (which in his view would automatically block its process of integration in NATO) and withdrawal of all Russian funds from the American "financial Titanic", buying gold and creating powerful Russian banks.

=== Prediction of the United States collapse in 2010 ===
Panarin's prediction of the USA's disintegration (original map).

In 1998, based on classified data about the state of the U.S. economy and society supplied to him by fellow analysts at FAPSI, Panarin forecast the probable disintegration of the US into six parts in 2010 (at the end of June – start of July 2010), following a civil war triggered by mass immigration, economic decline, and moral degradation. He forecast financial and demographic changes provoking a political crisis in which wealthier states will withhold funds from the federal government, effectively seceding from the Union, leading to social unrest, civil war, national division, and intervention of foreign powers.

Explaining his theory in an interview with Izvestia, Panarin stated that "The U.S. dollar isn't secured by anything. The country's foreign debt has grown like an avalanche; this is a pyramid, which has to collapse. ... Dissatisfaction is growing, and it is only being held back at the moment by the elections, and the hope [that President-elect Barack Obama] can work miracles. But when spring comes, it will be clear that there are no miracles."

In an interview with The Wall Street Journal in 2008, Panarin said:

There's a 55–45% chance right now that disintegration will occur. ... One could rejoice in that process ... But if we're talking reasonably, it's not the best scenario – for Russia. Though Russia would become more powerful on the global stage, he says, its economy would suffer because it currently depends heavily on the dollar and on trade with the U.S.

In March 2009, Panarin gave a speech at the Diplomatic Academy in which he stated that "There is a high probability that the collapse of the United States will occur by 2010" and predicted that Russia and China, which will soon become economic superpowers, will need to collaborate to rebuild the world economy with a new currency once the United States (and the U.S. dollar) cease to exist.

This hypothesis gained world attention a decade after its initial announcement due to the 2008 financial crisis and has been widely criticised since.

In October 2011, Panarin stated that Occupy Wall Street protests have "highlighted the ever-deepening split with America's ruling elite." He also cited several American professors and analysts who he claims support his view that the United States will soon collapse, including Gerald Celente, Stephen F. Cohen, and Thomas W. Chittum.

=== Other ideas ===
Panarin conceived a number of other ideas, given below in chronological order, which also reflect his views on the respective subjects. One of them (the rouble-denominated oil-trading exchange) has already been implemented.

- Informational-psychological subunits in government and military directorates: proposed in 1997; would develop strategic and operational measures to prevent or neutralise attempts to control the psyche of Russian society (i.e. a strategy of psychological defence). A Chief Directorate in Support of Psychological Security would ensure the psychological component of Russian national security.
- Media and terrorism: In his view, the media are to a certain degree a catalyst for terrorism because terrorist acts of such a volume would be impossible without them; also, the press induces panic in the organs of state authority and affects the public negatively.

Eurasian Economic Community

- Eurasian Union: proposed in January 2006 as Eurasian Rus – an interstate formation modelled after the European Union on the territory of the post-Soviet area headed by a Prince (after Machiavelli) that would restore and strengthen the economic integration, with gradual incorporation of a series of Balkan and other countries. He proposed Vladimir Putin as the first Prince of the formation, which he renamed in 2009 to Eurasian Union and proposed St Petersburg as its capital by 2012, when in his view only 3 planetary centres of force would exist – the European Union (EU-1), the Eurasian Union (EU-2), and the Chinese Commonwealth. In April 2009 he proposed a second, Southern capital – Alma-Ata.
- Rouble-denominated oil-trading exchange in Russia: proposed in February 2006. Such an exchange was opened in St Petersburg on 24 September 2008, and as soon as in March 2009, Rosneft (the leader in the Russian oil field and one of the largest public oil companies in the world) sold by auction 7.6 thousands of tonnes of oil products for 97 million roubles. For March, the auction volume amounts to 15–20 thousand tonnes of oil products monthly. Besides Rosneft, other major Russian oil companies like Gazprom Oil, Lukoil, Surgutneftegas, and TNK-BP also plan to go to the exchange, and crude oil trade is expected to start in a few months.
- Information-ideological geopolitical development concept: proposed in 2008 in his book Information warfare for the future of Russia, where he develops the basic ideas of Eurasian integration. In his view, by 2012 Russia will have made a transition from sovereign democracy to a geopolitical project of Eurasian Integration.
- New world currency – ACURE: proposed in March 2009. To be based on the three leading world currencies: the Asian Currency Unit (a regional currency basket that was first proposed in 2006 based on the currencies of Japan, China, and South Korea along with the ASEAN group), the rouble, and the euro.

== Bibliography ==
=== Books ===
- Psychological Security of the Army, Moscow, 1996 (in Russian)
- Psychological Aspects of Ensuring the National Security of Russia, Moscow, 1995 (part I), 1996 (part II) (in Russian)
- Information Warfare and Russia, School aid of the Diplomatic Academy of the Ministry of Foreign Affairs, 2000, (in Russian)
- Information Warfare and Authority, Security World, 2001, ISBN 5-89258-033-4 (in Russian)
- Information. Diplomacy. Psychology, Izvestia, 2002, ISBN 5-206-00606-8 (in Russian)
- Information Warfare Technology, KSP+, 2003, ISBN 5-89692-084-9 (in Russian)
- Information Warfare and the World, OLMA-Press, 2003, ISBN 5-224-04397-2 (in Russian)
- Information Warfare and Elections, Gorodets, 2003, ISBN 5-9584-0002-9 (in Russian)
- Information Warfare: Victory in Bashkiria, Gorodets, 2004, ISBN 5-9584-0021-5 (in Russian)
- Information Warfare and Diplomacy, Gorodets, 2004, ISBN 5-9584-0032-0 (in Russian)
- Information Warfare and the Third Rome, Cyril and Methodius, 2005, on-line book, (in Russian)
- Information Warfare, PR, and the World Politics, Hotline – Telecom, 2006, ISBN 5-93517-297-6 (in Russian)
- Information Warfare and Geopolitics, Generation, 2006, ISBN 5-9763-0001-4 (in Russian)
- Information Warfare for the Future of Russia, Hotline – Telecom, 2008, ISBN 978-5-9912-0039-4 (in Russian)
- The Crash of the Dollar and the Disintegration of the USA, Hotline – Telecom, 2009, ISBN 978-5-9912-0113-1 (in Russian)
- World after Crisis, or What Is Next, Piter Publishing House, 2011, ISBN 978-5-459-00319-2 (in Russian)

=== Articles ===
- "Psychological security of military personnel", Landmark, issue No. 8, 1995 (in Russian)
- "Information security problems in modern conditions", 1997 (in Russian)
- "Strengthening of the role of the informational factors in Russia's national security system", Authority, issue No. 1, 1998, ISSN 2071-5358 (in Russian)
- "Information warfare and financial crises", VIP, issue No. 1, 1999 (in Russian)
- "Is a collapse of the USA in 2010 possible?", Authority, issue No. 6, 1999, ISSN 2071-5358 (in Russian)
- "Unoccupied heights: Public opinion as an object of influence and struggle in the contemporary armed conflict", Security World, issue No. 7, 1999, ISSN 1813-1034 (in Russian)
- "Is Russia ready for the 21st century information warfare?", Authority, issue No. 2, 2000, ISSN 2071-5358 (in Russian)
- "Nontraditional view on the problem of foreign debt", Banking in Moscow, issue No. 3, 2001 (in Russian)
- "Information warfare: theory and practice", Human Resource Policies, issue No. 2, 2002 (in Russian)
- "An instrument of foreign policy", Military-industrial courier, issue No. 32, 2008, ISSN 1729-3928 (in Russian)
- "Secrets of 11 September", Military-industrial courier, issue No. 37, 2008, ISSN 1729-3928 (in Russian)
- "A system of informational counteraction", Military-industrial courier, issue No. 41, 2008, ISSN 1729-3928 (in Russian)
- "The Dollar as a world currency will vanish in the autumn of 2009", Metal Buildings, issue No. 3, 2009, ISSN 0005-9889 (in Russian)

== See also ==
- Eurasianists
- Aleksandr Dugin
