= Chittum =

Chittum is a surname. Notable people with the surname include:

- Nelson Chittum (born 1933), American baseball player
- Thomas W. Chittum (born 1947), American mercenary
