= Jim Lucas (politician) =

American politician and businessman

Member of the Indiana House of Representatives from the 69th district
- Incumbent
- Assumed office November 7, 2012
- Preceded by: Dave Cheatham

Personal details
- Born: Seymour, Indiana, U.S.
- Party: Republican
- Spouse: Lynn Lucas
- Children: 3

Military service
- Branch/service: United States Marine Corps

Jim Lucas is an American politician and businessman serving as a member of the Indiana House of Representatives from the 69th district. He assumed office on November 7, 2012.

== Early life and education ==
Lucas was born and raised in Seymour, Indiana. He graduated from Seymour High School.

== Career ==
Lucas served in the United States Marine Corps. Outside of politics, he operates TAG Graphics, a graphic design company, and the Awning Guy, a construction company. Running as a Republican, he was elected to the Indiana House of Representatives in November 2012. From 2015 to 2017, he served as vice chair of the House Government and Regulatory Reform Committee. During the 2019–2020 legislative session, he served as vice chair of the House Select Committee on Government Reduction.

== Controversies ==
Lucas has been the subject of numerous controversies, causing some to call for his resignation, as well as the removal of his position on several committees.

=== Comments on rape and domestic violence ===
In June 2017, Lucas was caught in controversy for comments he made regarding rape victims, including claims that women who carried weapons had learned "how to not be victims," leading to accusations of victim blaming. Earlier that year, he had been the subject of controversy for a meme which was perceived to be mocking domestic violence victims.

=== Facebook posts about race and slavery ===
In August 2019, Lucas was caught in controversy after posting a photo of a noose under a photo of a black man convicted of rape. Later, in May 2020, Lucas was once again caught in controversy for posting a meme that was perceived to contain racist stereotypes of black children, leading to his removal from several study committees by House Speaker Todd Huston. In March 2021, Lucas received criticism for comments made about slavery in a Facebook live video.

=== Uvalde shooting ===
In June 2022, Lucas faced widespread backlash over a post on Facebook which suggested that the Robb Elementary School shooting was a false flag operation, with some comparing the comments Lucas made on the shooting to those made by alt-right conspiracy theorist Alex Jones.

=== Joseph Goebbels quote ===
In August 2022, Lucas received more backlash after posting a quote attributed to Nazi propagandist Joseph Goebbels on his Facebook account. Lucas later followed up on the post and refused to issue an apology.

=== DUI arrest ===
On May 31, 2023, Indiana State Police reported that Lucas was arrested after crashing his vehicle into a guard rail on the I-65 just north of Seymour around midnight. Lucas had left the scene in the vehicle, driving the wrong way down an entrance ramp. He told officers he had swerved to avoid a deer. The ISP reported officers from the Seymour Police Department found the vehicle parked behind a business almost three miles from the crash site, having been driven there on two bare rims and a flat tire. He was arrested by a trooper from the ISP-Versailles Post for driving while intoxicated and leaving the scene of an accident. On June 12, 2023, Lucas agreed to enter a plea agreement pleading guilty to two misdemeanor charges of operating a vehicle while intoxicated and leaving the scene of an accident. He will serve a suspended sentence of 240 days for the two charges and serve one year on probation.

=== Statehouse gun incident ===
On January 30, 2024, Lucas was recorded by a student as having flashed a handgun at a group of Burris Laboratory School students who were visiting the Statehouse to urge state lawmakers to introduce laws aimed at curbing gun violence. His actions faced criticism from Republican House Speaker Todd Huston as well as Democratic representatives Sue Errington and Phil GiaQuinta.

== Personal life ==
Lucas and his ex-wife, Lynn, have three children.

== Electoral history ==
Indiana House of Representatives, District 69, 2012
Party	Candidate	Votes	%	±%
Republican	Jim Lucas	13,787	57.8%	
Democratic	Jim McCormick	10,070	42.2%	
Turnout		23,857		
Republican gain from Democratic		Swing		

Indiana House of Representatives, District 69, 2014
Party	Candidate	Votes	%	±%
Republican	Jim Lucas (incumbent)	12,200	100%	
Turnout		12,200		
Republican hold		Swing		

Indiana House of Representatives, District 69, 2016
Party	Candidate	Votes	%	±%
Republican	Jim Lucas (incumbent)	20,768	100%	
Turnout		20,768		
Republican hold		Swing		

Indiana House of Representatives, District 69, 2018
Party	Candidate	Votes	%	±%
Republican	Jim Lucas (incumbent)	14,604	69.2%	
Democratic	Steve Schoettmer	6,480	30.7%	
Turnout		21,084		
Republican hold		Swing		

Indiana House of Representatives, District 69, 2020
Party	Candidate	Votes	%	±%
Republican	Jim Lucas (incumbent)	18,784	67.3%	
Democratic	Jeffery W. Prewitt	4,924	17.6%	
Independent	Katrina "Kat" Hardwick	4,186	15.0%	
Turnout		27,894		
Republican hold		Swing		

Indiana House of Representatives, District 69, 2022
Party	Candidate	Votes	%	±%
Republican	Jim Lucas (incumbent)	12,526	73.7%	
Democratic	Chad Harmon	4,475	26.3%	
Turnout		17,001		
Republican hold		Swing		

Indiana House of Representatives District 69 - Republican Primary, 2024
Party	Candidate	Votes	%	±%
Republican	Jim Lucas (incumbent)	4,584	57.5	
Republican	Brian Savilla	3,390	42.5	
Total votes		7,974	100.0	
