= Steven Cheetham =

English cricketer

Personal information
- Full name: Steven Philip Cheetham
- Born: 5 September 1987 (age 39); Oldham, Greater Manchester, England
- Height: 6 ft 5 in (1.96 m)
- Batting: Right-handed
- Bowling: Right-arm fast-medium
- Role: Bowler

Domestic team information
- Years: Team
- 2003–2011: Lancashire (squad no. 18)
- 2010: → Surrey (on loan)

Career statistics
Competition	First-class	List A
Matches	2	18
Runs scored	0	48
Batting average	0.00	12.00
100s/50s	0/0	0/0
Top score	0*	20*
Balls bowled	240	642
Wickets	3	19
Bowling average	66.00	34.89
5 wickets in innings	0	0
10 wickets in match	0	0
Best bowling	2/71	4/32
Catches/stumpings	1/–	2/–
- Source: Cricinfo, 2 November 2011

Steven Philip Cheetham (born 5 September 1987) is an English cricketer. He is a right-handed batsman and a right-arm fast bowler who played for Lancashire. He was born in Oldham, Greater Manchester, and attended Bury Grammar School. Cheetham is a right arm fast/medium bowler and a lower order batsman.

== Career ==
Cheetham made his debut in first-class cricket in a match between Lancashire and Durham University in April 2007. A year later, Cheetham played his maiden list A match; on 18 May, Lancashire played Durham. Cheetham took 2/39 as Lancashire lost by six runs. Until his loan to Surrey towards the end of the 2010 season, Cheetham played thirty five list A matches for Lancashire, including one against each of the Bangladesh and West Indies A teams.

On 4 August 2010, Cheetham moved to Surrey until the end of the 2010 season on loan. With limited opportunities to play first-team cricket at Lancashire after a run of injuries, there was a greater chance to play at Surrey who at the time had suffered injuries to their bowling attack. Following an injury to Lancashire captain and bowler Glen Chapple in September, Cheetham was recalled early from his stint with Surrey. In October 2011, the season where Lancashire won the county championship, having been unable to break into Lancashire's first-team due to a serious long term recurring ankle injury, Cheetham was released by the club. He then went on to have one final season with Yorkshire County Cricket Club.
