= Donna Cheatham =

American basketball coach

- Occupation: High school basketball coach
- Known for: Having more girls' basketball coaching wins than any other coach in Indiana girls' basketball history

Donna Cheatham is a high school basketball coach. She has the most wins of any coach in Indiana girls’ high school basketball history. She graduated from Georgetown College in 1967 where she was a three-sport athlete, participating in basketball, volleyball and softball. After graduating with a biology degree, Cheatham took to the coaching ranks, where her career has placed her among the all-time best in the state of Indiana women's basketball. Cheatham coached at Scottsburg High School for 22 years, racking up a 379–80 (82.6%) record, the second best winning percentage in the state of Indiana for girls' basketball. Cheatham has served as coach of three All-Star teams and led her team to a 1989 high school state championship title. Her 1989 squad was ranked 13th nationwide by USA Today, and her 1990 team was ranked 10th in the country by Street & Smith. She has received 29 Coach of the Year honors during her tenure, including three that boasted national Coach of the Year recognition. She served on countless camps and clinics as a guest speaker and coach while at Scottsburg High School. Cheatham also coached softball at Scottsburg for eight years, recording a 41–7 record. She was named Scott County, Indiana, Woman of the Year in 1986 for her service and was a member of the Scottsburg Women's Athletic Council for 22 years.

At Southwestern High School in Hanover, Indiana, Cheatham has a 125–67 record in 8 years. On January 31, 2005, she recorded her 500th career victory, becoming the only girls' coach in the state's history to do so. To her name at Southwestern are numerous achievements, including four sectional titles, two regional titles, two semi-state, one state runner-up (2003), and one state title (2002). Through 43 years of coaching, Donna has tallied 699 career wins to 257 career losses (.731 win pct).

She has been the head coach once again at Scottsburg. Since June 23, 2009.
