= Dave Cheatham =

American politician

Member of the U.S. House of Representatives from Indiana's 69th district
- In office November 8, 2006 – November 7, 2012
- Preceded by: Billy Bright
- Succeeded by: Jim Lucas
- In office November 7, 1984 – November 4, 1992
- Preceded by: Michael Rae Marshall
- Succeeded by: Markt Lytle

Personal details
- Born: January 16, 1951 (age 75) Madison, Indiana, U.S.
- Party: Democratic
- Spouse: Gayla
- Education: Indiana State University (BS); Purdue University (MA)

Dave Cheatham (born January 16, 1951) is an American politician and former educator who served as a member of the Indiana House of Representatives for the 69th district from 1984 to 1992 and again from 2006 to 2012. He is a member of the Democratic Party.
