= Jackie Cheetham =

Scottish footballer (1904–1987)

Personal information
- Full name: John Cheetham
- Date of birth: 25 March 1904
- Place of birth: Wishaw, Scotland
- Date of death: 1987 (aged 82–83)
- Position: Centre forward

Senior career*
Years	Team	Apps	(Gls)
1923–1924	Linotype		
1924–1925	Broxburn United		
1925–1926	Brighton & Hove Albion	8	(0)
1926–1927	West Ham United	0	(0)
1927–1928	Eccles United		
1928	Hurst		
1928–1930	Swansea Town	25	(11)
1930–1931	Connah's Quay & Shotton		
1931–1932	Ashton National		
1932–1933	Hyde United		
1933–1934	Accrington Stanley	39	(15)
1934–1935	Stalybridge Celtic		
1935–1936	Witton Albion		
1936	Linotype		
Total		72	(26)
- * Club domestic league appearances and goals

John Cheetham (25 March 1904 – 1987) was a Scottish footballer who played in the Football League for Accrington Stanley, Brighton & Hove Albion and Swansea Town.
