= Aleksandr Panarin =

Russian footballer (born 1987)

Personal information
- Full name: Aleksandr Aleksandrovich Panarin
- Date of birth: 29 December 1987 (age 38)
- Place of birth: Voronezh, Russian SFSR
- Height: 1.72 m (5 ft 7 1/2 in)
- Position: Midfielder

Youth career
- SDYuSShOR-14 Voronezh

Senior career*
Years	Team	Apps	(Gls)
2006	FC Fakel Voronezh	9	(0)
2007	FC Fakel Voronezh (amateur)		
2007	FC FCS-73 Voronezh (amateur)		
2008	FC FCS-73 Voronezh	30	(1)
2009–2010	FC Fakel Voronezh	32	(6)
2011	FC Yelets (amateur)		
2012	FC Astrakhan	8	(1)
2012–2013	FC Khimik Novomoskovsk (amateur)		
2013	FC Vybor-Kurbatovo Voronezh (amateur)		
2015	FC Sloboda Alekseyevka		
2016	FC Spartak Rossosh		
- * Club domestic league appearances and goals

Aleksandr Aleksandrovich Panarin (Russian: Александр Александрович Панарин; born 29 December 1987) is a former Russian professional football player.

== Club career ==
He played in the Russian Football National League for FC Fakel Voronezh in 2006.
