= Cheetham =

Cheetham may refer to:

== People ==
- Cheetham (surname)

== Places ==
- Cheetham and Altona Important Bird Area, Melbourne, Australia
- Cheetham Close, a megalith and scheduled ancient monument located in Lancashire, very close to the boundary with Greater Manchester
- Cheetham, Manchester, a suburban area of the city of Manchester, England
- Cheetham Ice Tongue, a small ice tongue on the east coast of Victoria Land region of Antarctica
- Cape Cheetham, an ice-covered cape forming the northeast extremity of Stuhlinger Ice Piedmont in the Victoria Land region of Antarctica
- Manchester Cheetham (UK Parliament constituency), a parliamentary constituency in the city of Manchester

== See also ==
- Cheatham (disambiguation)
