= Eugene Calvin Cheatham Jr. =

Episcopal missionary (1915–2005)

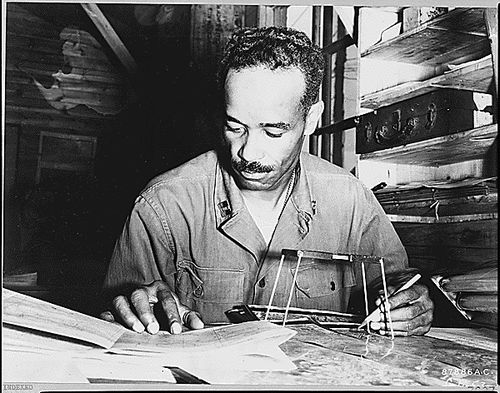
- Cheatham studying aerial photographs during the Korean War, 1951
- Born: August 27, 1915; Georgia, U.S.
- Died: May 10, 2005 (aged 89); Spring Valley, California, U.S.
- Military career
- Allegiance: Units
- Branch: United States Army Air Corps; United States Army Air Forces; United States Air Force
- Service years: 1941–1977
- Rank: Lieutenant colonel
- Units: 332nd Fighter Group; 67th Tactical Reconnaissance Wing
- Conflicts: World War II; Korean War

Eugene Calvin Cheatham Jr. (August 27, 1915 — May 10, 2005) was one of the Tuskegee Airmen and a career officer in the United States Air Force.

Cheatham was born in Georgia, United States; his father was an Episcopal missionary whose work took the family to Africa and Europe. While living in New York City, he became a Boy Scout and by 1930 he had completed the requirements for Eagle Scout. Unable to afford a full uniform, he never appeared before his board of review.

Cheatham was a fighter pilot with the 332nd Fighter Group— better known as the Tuskegee Airmen —during World War II. He flew 150 missions during the Korean War. He achieved the rank of lieutenant colonel and retired in 1977. He then worked as a personnel and equal-opportunity officer for the Air Force, serving in Japan, Montana and San Bernardino, California.

In 2001, Cheatham attended a Veterans Day event where he expressed his regret at not earning Eagle Scout to one of the organizers who happened to be an Eagle Scout. Executives from International Profit Associates petitioned the National Council of the BSA to award Cheatham's Eagle Scout. Unable to locate records, the Scouts tested Cheatham and performed an exhaustive board of review according to the requirements of 1930. On September 18, 2004, Cheatham was awarded his Eagle Scout in a ceremony at the San Diego Air & Space Museum.

Cheatham died on May 10, 2005, from pancreatic cancer and is buried at Arlington National Cemetery.
