= Robert Chitham =

British architect and writer

Robert Chitham (1935 or 36 – 13 September 2017) was a British architect and writer. He was the author of The Classical Orders of Architecture published in 1985. A revised edition was published in 2005. He drew from the diagramming and harmony of proportions of classical forms starting from Vitruvius, to Palladio, and foremost to James Gibbs. Chitham was the most recent architect to spell out extensively a more updated, modern, and refined version of classical architecture. Chitham was also the author of Measured drawing for architects, published in 1980.

Chitham was a consultant architect to Chapman Taylor, a London-based architectural practice. In this capacity he was responsible in the early 1980s for a scheme to save a large number of historic buildings in Bloomsbury, near the British Museum. He served as chairman of the Register of Architects Accredited in Building Conservation, and was head of the historic buildings division of English Heritage.

He was the author of "The Classical Orders of Architecture" (Architectural Press, updated 2005) which provided "an accessible introduction" to the basics of Classical architecture.
