= Thomas W. Chittum =

American mercenary (born 1947)

Thomas Chittum
- Born: February 28, 1947 (age 79); New Jersey, US
- Military career
- Allegiance: United States
- Branch: United States Army
- Rank: Private First Class
- Unit: 173rd Airborne Brigade
- Conflicts: Vietnam War
- Mercenary career
- Allegiance: Rhodesia; Croatia
- Conflicts: Vietnam War; Rhodesian Bush War; Croatian War of Independence

Thomas W. Chittum is an American author, military analyst and former mercenary from New Jersey, now living in Washington state. He served in the U.S. Army during the Vietnam War. Chittum also fought in the Rhodesian War and the Croatian War of Independence as a mercenary.

== Biography ==
Chittum was born in New Jersey on February 28, 1947, to Mr. and Mrs. James R. Chittum. His father worked as a tool designer for Caterpillar Tractor Co. Chittum joined the army and trained as a paratrooper with the 173rd Army Brigade. He was originally stationed in Okinawa, but was sent to Vietnam where he served from 1965 until 1966. He was involved in numerous fire fights, including a battle in which his patrol killed a Viet Cong recruiter who had connections to China. Chittum was also involved in an operation in which he raided an abandoned Viet Cong base which contained propaganda leaflets connected to the Youth Against War and Fascism.

From 1991 until 1992, Chittum fought with the Croatian Army in Croatia's War of Independence. He first served in a recon unit made up of mostly Dutch mercenaries. He then served in a mortar unit made up of British and regular Croatian soldiers. His time in Croatia was mostly spent in trenches avoiding attacks from Serbian mortars, tanks, heavy machine guns and jets. Both sides relied on trench warfare and Chittum noted that one of the British mercenaries he served with once said "It was a war fought with 1970s technology and 1914 tactics."

Chittum spent most of his adult life working as a computer programmer.

== Theories ==
Chittum predicts that the United States will soon face Balkanization and a second Civil War based on racial conflicts. He plans to move to upstate New York because it would likely still be a Caucasian-controlled area after the American Southwest effectively becomes part of Mexico by 2020 due to immigration.

Chittum was a speaker at the First Annual Conference on Racial Separatism in 1998, which also featured Jared Taylor, Robert Brock, and Don Black. Those at the conference speculated about looming world and race wars. The now deceased Willis Carto suggested that the United States use funds that he said would otherwise go to Israel to re-settle African-Americans in Africa, and Brock stated that Carto's plan would lead to Africa putting a man on the moon within three years. Brock also advanced the claim that both black and white nationalists needed to be racists in order to keep their identities intact.

== Works ==
- Sgt Skull's Field Manual for the Practical Modern Warrior, 2006
- Civil War Two: The Coming Breakup of America Tucson, Arizona: American Eagle Publications (1997, updated 2007) ISBN 0-929408-17-9
- The White Duds: The Real Life Teenage Dirty Dozen in Vietnam (2017) ISBN 9781520618258

== See also ==
- American Renaissance
