= 2018 Indiana Secretary of State election =

- November 6, 2018
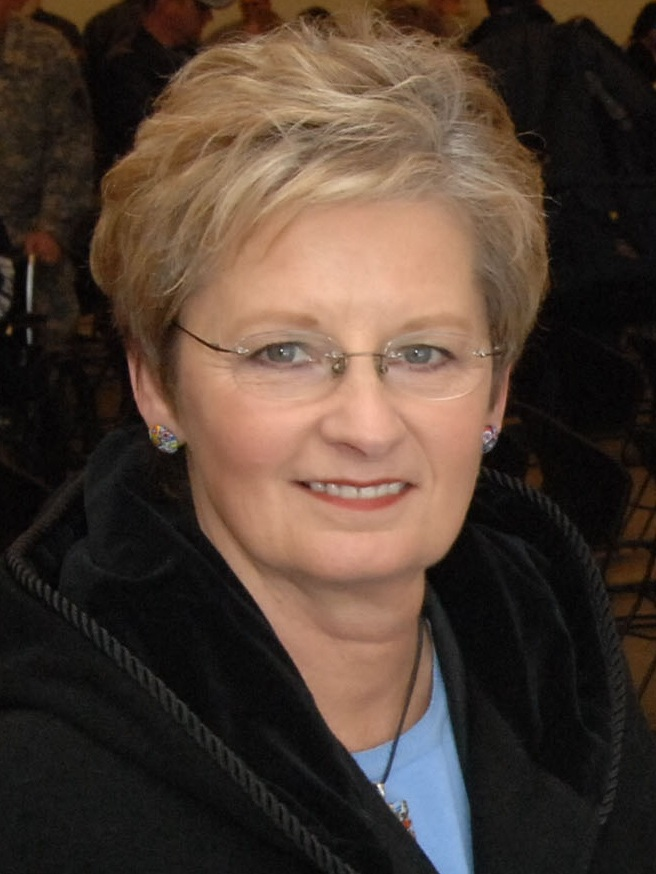

Candidate	Connie Lawson	Jim Harper
Party	Republican	Democratic
Popular vote	1,263,074	911,546
Percentage	56.22%	40.57%
- County results Lawson: 50–60% 60–70% 70–80% Harper: 40–50% 50–60% 60–70%
Secretary of State before election
Connie Lawson
Republican
Elected Secretary of State
Connie Lawson
Republican

The 2018 Indiana Secretary of State election was held on November 6, 2018, to elect the Secretary of State of Indiana, concurrently with elections to the United States Senate, U.S. House of Representatives, and other state and local elections. Primary elections were held on May 8, 2018, though both the Republican and Democratic nominees were selected via a convention.

First appointed as the Secretary of State of Indiana in March 2012 after Charles White was expelled from office, incumbent Republican secretary Connie Lawson comfortably won re-election to a second full term in office against Democratic nominee Jim Harper. Election security was a key issue throughout the campaign. There were reports of significant election irregularities and errors at several polling locations across Indiana on Election Day.

The Green and Pirate parties did not qualify outright for the ballot, but ran write-in candidates instead. Lawson would go on to resign as Secretary of State in March 2021, with Holli Sullivan being appointed as an interim secretary of state until the next election.

== Republican convention ==
=== Candidates ===
==== Nominee ====
- Connie Lawson, incumbent secretary of state (2012–present) and state senator from the 24th district (1996–2012)

== Democratic convention ==
=== Candidates ===
==== Nominee ====
- Jim Harper, attorney and former candidate for state senate

== General election ==
=== Predictions ===
Source	Ranking	As of
Governing	Likely R	October 11, 2018

=== Endorsements ===
Connie Lawson (R)

Individuals

- Kyle Hupfer, chair of the Indiana Republican Party
Jim Harper (D)

Labor unions

- Indiana AFL-CIO
- International Brotherhood of Boilermakers, Iron Ship Builders, Blacksmiths, Forgers and Helpers
- IBEW Local 21
- IUOE Locals 150 & 399
- Teamsters Local 89

Organizations

- Greater Lafayette Indivisible

=== Results ===
2018 Indiana Secretary of State election
Party	Candidate	Votes	%
Republican	Connie Lawson (incumbent)	1,263,074	56.22%
Democratic	Jim Harper	911,546	40.57%
Libertarian	Mark Rutherford	71,234	3.17%
Green	George William Wolfe (write-in)	848	0.04%
Pirate	Jeremy Heath (write-in)	57	0.00%
Total votes		2,246,759	100.00%
Republican hold			
