= 2024 Indiana Attorney General election =

- November 5, 2024
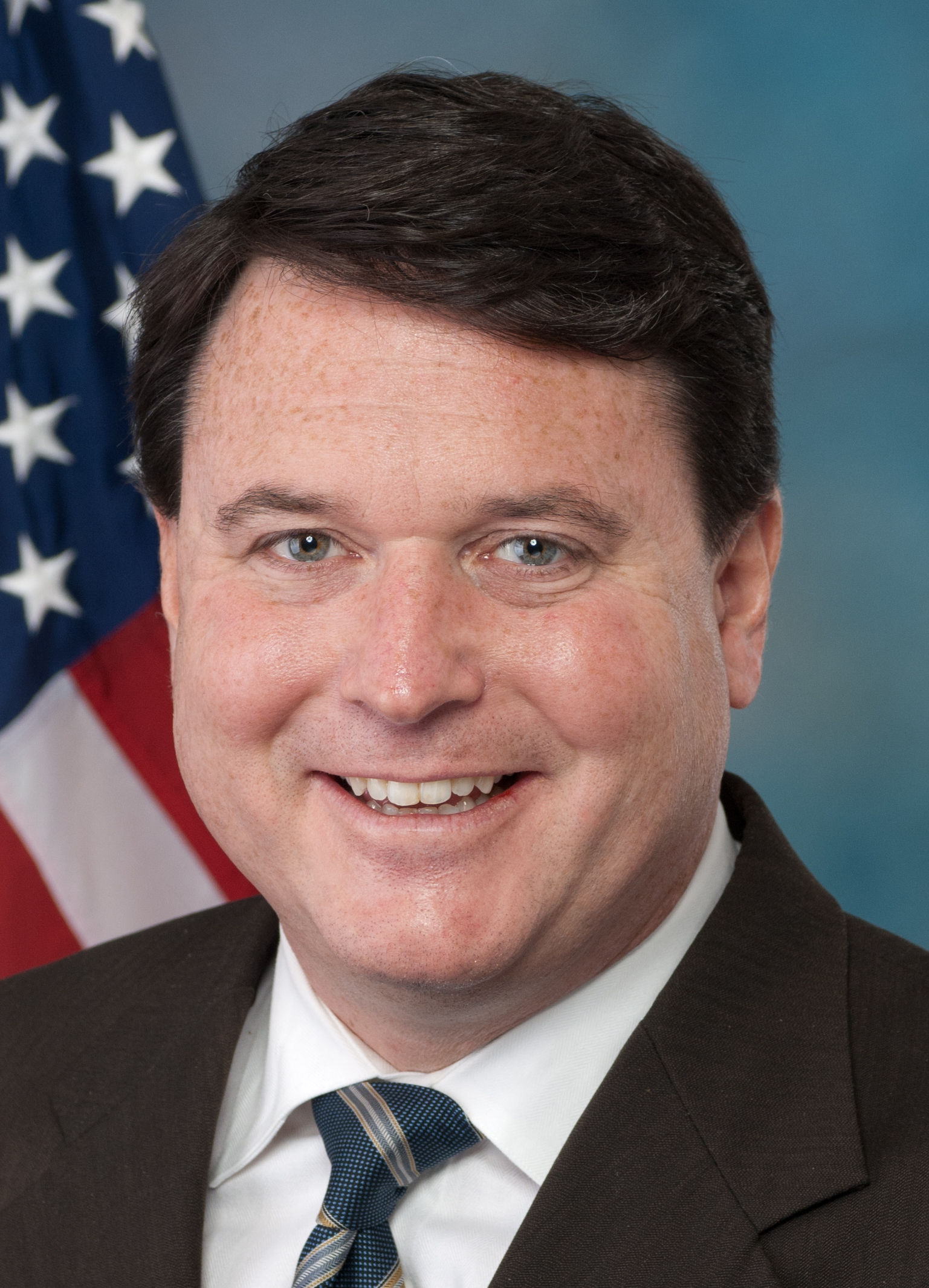

| Nominee | Todd Rokita | Destiny Wells |
| Party | Republican | Democratic |
| Popular vote | 1,669,586 | 1,168,512 |
| Percentage | 58.83% | 41.17% |
- Rokita: 50–60% 60–70% 70–80% 80–90% >90% Wells: 50–60% 60–70% 70–80% 80–90% >90% Tie: 50% No votes
Attorney General before election
Todd Rokita
Republican
Elected Attorney General
Todd Rokita
Republican

The 2024 Indiana Attorney General election was held on November 5, 2024, to elect the attorney general of the state of Indiana. It coincided with the concurrent presidential election, as well as various state and local elections, including for U.S. Senate, U.S. House, and governor of Indiana.

The Republican Convention took place on June 15. The Democratic Convention took place on July 13. Incumbent attorney general Todd Rokita was elected for a second term defeating Democratic lawyer Destiny Wells.

== Republican convention ==
=== Candidates ===
==== Nominee ====
- Todd Rokita, incumbent attorney general

== Democratic convention ==
=== Candidates ===
==== Nominee ====
- Destiny Wells, lawyer, former assistant attorney general, and nominee for secretary of state in 2022

==== Eliminated at convention ====
- Beth White, former Marion County Clerk and nominee for secretary of state in 2014

==== Results ====
Democratic convention results
| Candidate | Round 1 | |
| Candidate | Votes | % |
|---|---|---|
| Destiny Wells | 1,057 | 68.99 |
| Beth White | 475 | 31.00 |
| Total ballots | 1,532 | 100.00 |

== General election ==
=== Predictions ===
| Source | Ranking | As of |
|---|---|---|
| Sabato's Crystal Ball | Likely R | July 25, 2024 |

=== Fundraising ===
Campaign finance reports as of September 30, 2024
| Candidate | Raised | Spent | Cash on hand |
|---|---|---|---|
| Todd Rokita (R) | $2,618,207 | $582,391 | $2,035,816 |
| Destiny Wells (D) | $838,443 | $290,118 | $548,325 |
Source: Indiana Secretary of State

=== Debate ===
2024 Indiana Attorney General election debate
| No. | Date | Host | Moderator | Link | Participants | |
| Key: P Participant A Absent N Non-invitee I Invitee W Withdrawn | | | | | | |
| Key: P Participant A Absent N Non-invitee I Invitee W Withdrawn | | | | | Rokita | Wells |
|---|---|---|---|---|---|---|
| 1 | October 2, 2024 | FOX 59/CBS 4 | Dan Spehler | Video | P | P |

=== Endorsements ===
Todd Rokita (R)

Executive branch officials

- Donald Trump, 45th president of the United States (2017–2021)

U.S. Representatives

- Jim Banks, U.S. Representative for Indiana's 3rd congressional district (2017–present)

Statewide officials

- Daniel Elliott, Treasurer of Indiana (2023–present)
- Diego Morales, Secretary of State of Indiana (2023–present)
- Elise Nieshalla, Comptroller of Indiana (2023–present)

Organizations

- NRA Political Victory Fund
Destiny Wells (D)

Organizations

- Vote Mama

=== Polling ===
| Poll source | Date(s) administered | Sample size (Note: Key: A – all adults RV – registered voters LV – likely voters V – unclear) | Margin of error | Todd Rokita (R) | Destiny Wells (D) | Undecided |
|---|---|---|---|---|---|---|
| ActiVote | October 5–28, 2024 | 400 (LV) | ± 4.9% | 55% | 45% | – |
| ActiVote | September 3 – October 5, 2024 | 400 (LV) | ± 4.9% | 53% | 47% | – |
| ARW Strategies (Note: Poll sponsored by IndyPolitics.org) | September 23–25, 2024 | 600 (LV) | – | 51% | 36% | 13% |
| Emerson College (Note: Poll sponsored by The Hill) | September 12–13, 2024 | 1,000 (LV) | ± 3% | 49% | 35% | 16% |
| Lake Research Partners (D) (Note: Poll sponsored by Wells's campaign) | August 26 – September 2, 2024 | 600 (LV) | ± 4% | 44% | 41% | 15% |

=== Results ===
2024 Indiana Attorney General election
| Party | Candidate | Votes | % | ±% |
|---|---|---|---|---|
| Republican | Todd Rokita (incumbent) | 1,669,586 | 58.83% | +0.49% |
| Democratic | Destiny Wells | 1,168,512 | 41.17% | −0.49% |
| Total votes | | 2,838,098 | 100.00% | |
| Republican hold | | | | |

==== By county ====
Vote breakdown by county
| | Todd Rokita Republican | | Destiny Wells Democratic | |
| County | Votes | % | Votes | % |
|---|---|---|---|---|
| Adams | 9,344 | 75.2% | 3,080 | 24.8% |
| Allen | 89,960 | 56.7% | 68,776 | 43.3% |
| Bartholomew | 20,105 | 62.4% | 12,097 | 37.6% |
| Benton | 2,948 | 75.0% | 985 | 25.0% |
| Blackford | 3,537 | 72.3% | 1,356 | 27.7% |
| Boone | 22,601 | 58.0% | 16,346 | 42.0% |
| Brown | 5,465 | 64.1% | 3,061 | 35.9% |
| Carroll | 6,854 | 74.6% | 2,334 | 25.4% |
| Cass | 9,803 | 69.6% | 4,285 | 30.4% |
| Clark | 33,952 | 59.7% | 22,874 | 40.3% |
| Clay | 8,957 | 76.8% | 2,709 | 23.2% |
| Clinton | 8,530 | 71.5% | 3,404 | 28.5% |
| Crawford | 3,317 | 70.9% | 1,362 | 29.1% |
| Daviess | 8,877 | 81.2% | 2,056 | 18.8% |
| Dearborn | 21,018 | 79.8% | 5,315 | 20.2% |
| Decatur | 9,030 | 77.4% | 2,641 | 22.6% |
| Dekalb | 13,185 | 72.5% | 5,006 | 27.5% |
| Delaware | 24,545 | 55.8% | 19,436 | 44.2% |
| Dubois | 14,472 | 71.8% | 5,677 | 28.2% |
| Elkhart | 46,301 | 66.5% | 23,333 | 33.5% |
| Fayette | 7,214 | 76.3% | 2,237 | 23.7% |
| Floyd | 23,744 | 58.4% | 16,879 | 41.6% |
| Fountain | 6,185 | 78.4% | 1,709 | 21.6% |
| Franklin | 9,357 | 82.3% | 2,014 | 17.7% |
| Fulton | 6,376 | 72.7% | 2,389 | 27.3% |
| Gibson | 11,561 | 75.0% | 3,845 | 25.0% |
| Grant | 15,915 | 69.5% | 6,985 | 30.5% |
| Greene | 10,580 | 75.5% | 3,433 | 24.5% |
| Hamilton | 97,441 | 53.7% | 84,046 | 46.3% |
| Hancock | 28,608 | 65.7% | 14,949 | 34.3% |
| Harrison | 14,516 | 73.0% | 5,365 | 27.0% |
| Hendricks | 48,596 | 60.4% | 31,854 | 39.6% |
| Henry | 14,516 | 71.0% | 5,929 | 29.0% |
| Howard | 25,070 | 65.5% | 13,183 | 34.5% |
| Huntington | 12,526 | 73.1% | 4,609 | 26.9% |
| Jackson | 14,170 | 77.4% | 4,148 | 22.6% |
| Jasper | 11,711 | 77.8% | 3,333 | 22.2% |
| Jay | 5,879 | 75.5% | 1,909 | 24.5% |
| Jefferson | 9,275 | 67.7% | 4,417 | 32.3% |
| Jennings | 8,983 | 78.1% | 2,513 | 21.9% |
| Johnson | 45,545 | 65.8% | 23,621 | 34.2% |
| Knox | 10,422 | 73.6% | 3,735 | 26.4% |
| Kosciusko | 25,835 | 76.1% | 8,128 | 23.9% |
| Lagrange | 7,795 | 77.5% | 2,260 | 22.5% |
| Lake | 93,352 | 46.6% | 106,829 | 53.4% |
| LaPorte | 26,030 | 57.2% | 19,499 | 42.8% |
| Lawrence | 15,243 | 75.0% | 5,082 | 25.0% |
| Madison | 33,719 | 61.1% | 21,465 | 38.9% |
| Marion | 123,832 | 35.2% | 228,038 | 64.8% |
| Marshall | 13,607 | 71.8% | 5,348 | 28.2% |
| Martin | 3,736 | 77.6% | 1,081 | 22.4% |
| Miami | 10,146 | 75.1% | 3,355 | 24.9% |
| Monroe | 21,010 | 36.2% | 36,972 | 63.8% |
| Montgomery | 11,823 | 72.7% | 4,440 | 27.3% |
| Morgan | 25,538 | 74.6% | 8,679 | 25.4% |
| Newton | 5,059 | 78.4% | 1,396 | 21.6% |
| Noble | 13,567 | 74.5% | 4,636 | 25.5% |
| Ohio | 2,294 | 77.1% | 682 | 22.9% |
| Orange | 6,035 | 74.8% | 2,029 | 25.2% |
| Owen | 6,977 | 73.2% | 2,560 | 26.8% |
| Parke | 4,986 | 77.2% | 1,471 | 22.8% |
| Perry | 5,183 | 63.3% | 3,008 | 36.7% |
| Pike | 4,346 | 76.2% | 1,357 | 23.8% |
| Porter | 47,380 | 56.0% | 37,297 | 44.0% |
| Posey | 9,230 | 72.3% | 3,533 | 27.7% |
| Pulaski | 4,191 | 76.0% | 1,324 | 24.0% |
| Putnam | 12,018 | 74.1% | 4,197 | 25.9% |
| Randolph | 7,605 | 74.6% | 2,588 | 25.4% |
| Ripley | 11,481 | 80.9% | 2,715 | 19.1% |
| Rush | 5,400 | 73.6% | 1,934 | 26.4% |
| Scott | 6,079 | 70.1% | 2,599 | 29.9% |
| Shelby | 13,467 | 71.5% | 5,381 | 28.5% |
| Spencer | 7,189 | 71.7% | 2,833 | 28.3% |
| St. Joseph | 54,545 | 50.1% | 54,291 | 49.9% |
| Starke | 7,337 | 74.3% | 2,536 | 25.7% |
| Steuben | 11,139 | 71.4% | 4,465 | 28.6% |
| Sullivan | 6,091 | 73.0% | 2,254 | 27.0% |
| Switzerland | 3,180 | 77.2% | 939 | 22.8% |
| Tippecanoe | 32,357 | 50.4% | 31,847 | 49.6% |
| Tipton | 5,634 | 73.3% | 2,048 | 26.7% |
| Union | 2,664 | 78.6% | 725 | 21.4% |
| Vanderburgh | 41,794 | 57.5% | 30,928 | 42.5% |
| Vermillion | 4,782 | 69.4% | 2,105 | 30.6% |
| Vigo | 23,176 | 57.8% | 16,937 | 42.2% |
| Wabash | 10,125 | 74.8% | 3,413 | 25.2% |
| Warren | 3,327 | 76.9% | 1,002 | 23.1% |
| Warrick | 21,207 | 66.5% | 10,706 | 33.5% |
| Washington | 9,390 | 76.5% | 2,891 | 23.5% |
| Wayne | 17,130 | 65.4% | 9,069 | 34.6% |
| Wells | 9,892 | 77.5% | 2,877 | 22.5% |
| White | 7,840 | 71.5% | 3,120 | 28.5% |
| Whitley | 12,792 | 74.4% | 4,408 | 25.6% |

Counties that flipped from Democratic to Republican

- St. Joseph (largest municipality: South Bend)
- Vanderburgh (largest city: Evansville)

==== By congressional district ====
Rokita won seven of nine congressional districts.

| District | Rokita | Wells | Representative |
|---|---|---|---|
| 1st | 49.8% | 50.2% | Frank J. Mrvan |
| 2nd | 63% | 37% | Rudy Yakym |
| 3rd | 65% | 35% | Jim Banks (118th Congress) |
| 3rd | 65% | 35% | Marlin Stutzman (119th Congress) |
| 4th | 64% | 36% | Jim Baird |
| 5th | 58% | 42% | Victoria Spartz |
| 6th | 65% | 35% | Greg Pence (118th Congress) |
| 6th | 65% | 35% | Jefferson Shreve (119th Congress) |
| 7th | 29% | 71% | André Carson |
| 8th | 67% | 33% | Larry Bucshon (118th Congress) |
| 8th | 67% | 33% | Mark Messmer (119th Congress) |
| 9th | 64% | 36% | Erin Houchin |

== Notes ==
Partisan clients

== See also ==
- 2024 United States attorney general elections
