= 2010 Indiana elections =

Indiana elections, 2010
- November 2, 2010
- Turnout: 41.26%

Elections were held in Indiana on Tuesday, November 2, 2010. Primary elections were held on May 4, 2010.

== Election information ==
=== Turnout ===
Turnout in the primaries was 20.86%, with 892,403 ballots cast.

Turnout in the general election was 41.26%, with 1,786,213 ballots cast.

== Federal ==
=== United States Senate ===
On February 15, 2010, incumbent Senator Evan Bayh announced that he would not seek reelection. This shocked the Democratic base, which had expected Bayh to seek a third term in the Senate and had thus not fielded any other candidates. On May 15, the executive committee of the Indiana Democratic Party announced that Representative Brad Ellsworth would be the party's nominee for Senator. Dan Coats, the winner of the five-way Republican primary election, was Ellsworth's main competitor in the race, along with Libertarian Rebecca Sink-Burris, and two independent candidates in the general election. During the campaign, Ellsworth attacked Coats' record as a lobbyist, while Coats branded Ellsworth as a puppet of President Obama and then-Speaker of the House Nancy Pelosi. On election day, Coats won 54.4% of the vote to Ellsworth's 40%. Rebecca Sink-Burris received 5.4%.

=== United States House of Representatives ===
All of Indiana's nine seats in the United States House of Representatives were up for election in 2010. In the United States House of Representatives elections in Indiana, 2008, Democrats had won five of Indiana's nine seats in the House, but public dissatisfaction with Democratic President Obama, combined with the birth of the Tea Party movement, led Republicans to win back two of these seats, giving them six seats to the Democrats' three.

== State ==
=== Secretary of State ===
2010 Indiana Secretary of State election
- November 2, 2010
- Turnout: 39.49%

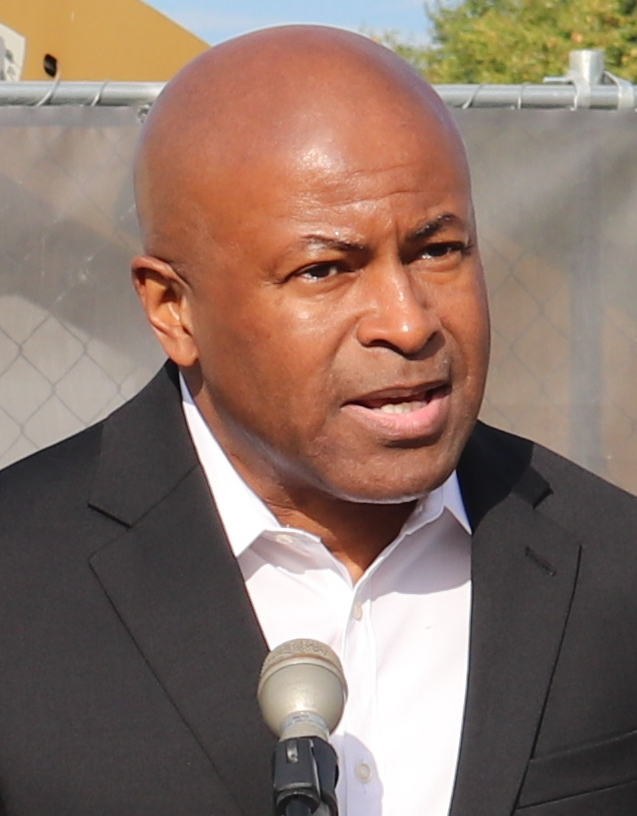

Nominee	Charles P. White	Vop Osili	Mike Wherry
Party	Republican	Democratic	Libertarian
Popular vote	976,810	632,129	100,795
Percentage	57.13%	36.97%	5.90%
- County results White: 40–50% 50–60% 60–70% 70–80% Osili: 50–60%
Secretary of State before election
Todd Rokita
Republican
Elected Secretary of State
Charles P. White
Republican

Incumbent Republican Todd Rokita (R) was term-limited and could not run for reelection. Candidates to replace Rokita included Democrat Vop Osili, Republican Charlie White, and Libertarian Mike Wherry. At the time, no Democrat had won a Secretary of State election in 20 years, and only three Democrats had won the office since 1964.

Olisi was a first-time candidate for office. He was an architect from Indianapolis. Olisi defeated Tom McKenna to win the Democratic nomination for Secretary of State at the state's Democratic Party Convention in Indianapolis, where Olisi's name was placed into nomination by Tom Henry. Tom McKenna, Olisi's opponent for the Democratic nomination, was a private attorney and a deputy prosecutor who had previously served in positions under governors Evan Bayh, Frank O'Bannon, and Joe Kernan, including as the head of the former Indiana Department of Commerce, an administrative judge law for the Indiana Department of Labor, and Kernan's chief of staff.

Olisi promised to connect new businesses with state economic development programs and with companies that might be interested in their services. Olisi promised to support exploring efforts to modernize the voting process, including looking at online voter registration, longer voting hours, more early voting locations and no-excuse absentee voting. He voiced opposition to Indiana's voter identification law, arguing that it disenfranchised between 40,000 and 200,000 Indiana voters. Olisi's campaign placed an emphasis on job-creation.

White promised to defend Indiana's voter ID law to ensure "fair and accurate elections." However, questions were raised about whether White had falsified his driver's license and residency, and therefore voted illegally, committing voter fraud.

One important facet of the Secretary of State's position was that, as chief elections officer, they would decide control of the Indiana House in the instance it were to be split 50-50.

Until September, the race had been seen as safely Republican. By October it was seen as a "tossup".

In what was seen to be shaping up as a Republican wave election, Osili hoped he could attract ticket splitting voters.

==== Endorsements ====
Vop Osili (D)

Organizations

- AFL–CIO
- Indiana State Teachers Association

Newspapers

- Fort Wayne Journal Gazette

==== Polls ====
Poll source	Date(s) administered	Sample size	Margin of error	Charles P. White	Vop Osili	Mike Wherry	Undecided
WISH-TV	Early October	–	–	39%	29%	5%	26%

==== Results ====
General election results
Party	Candidate	Votes	%
Republican	Charles P. White	976,810	57.13%
Democratic	Vop Osili	632,129	36.97%
Libertarian	Mike Wherry	100,795	5.90%
Total votes		1,709,734	

White won the election with 57% of the vote, but was soon charged with voter fraud. White was removed from office on February 4, 2012, after a jury convicted him on six felony counts including perjury, theft and voter fraud. A ruling by Judge Louis Rosenberg had found that since White had violated election law, and was therefore ineligible to run, the Recount Commission should remove White from office and declare Osili as the winner by default. This decision was reversed. Ultimately, however, the courts ruled that, instead, Governor Mitch Daniels would be able to fill the vacancy created by White's removal from office.

=== Treasurer ===
Incumbent Republican Treasurer Richard Mourdock ran for reelection. His Democratic opponent was Pete Buttigieg.

Democrat Buttigieg was considered a long-shot. Buttigieg was a political newcomer, a first-time candidate, and had never held public office, even proclaiming on his campaign website, "I'm a businessman who has never run for office before, but I have the education, experience and energy to lend a hand at this critical time in our state’s history." Buttigieg also lacked name recognition.

A main issue of contention was Mourdock's having invested $43 million of state pension funds and other state funds in Chrysler junk bonds, and having subsequently taken legal action tookin an attempt to stop Chrysler's bankruptcy plan (including the Chrysler-Fiat merger) from taking effect, Buttigieg criticized Mourdock both of these actions. Mourdock defended both actions

Buttigieg urged Mourdock to hold a debate with him. This was to no avail, ultimately.

Mourdock's candidacy was seen as benefiting from running in a very Republican-favorable election cycle and from being in a Republican-leaning state, making the strong favorite to win. In what was seen to be shaping up as a Republican wave election, Buttigieg hoped he could attract ticket splitting voters.

==== Endorsements ====
Pete Buttigieg (D)

Organizations

- AFL–CIO
- Indiana State Teachers Association
- United Automobile Workers
  - United Automobile Workers Citizenship and Legislative Committee
  - United Automobile Workers Region 3 Victory Fund.

Newspapers

- Fort Wayne Journal Gazette
- Indiana Daily Student
- South Bend Tribune
- The Times of Northwest Indiana

==== Results ====
Ahead of the election, the race was projected as leaning in Mourdock's favor.

Mourdock won a second term as treasurer with 62% of the vote.

Mourdock was the state's top vote-getter, receiving a greater number of votes than any other Indiana candidate in the 2010 elections.

General election results
Party	Candidate	Votes	%
Republican	Richard Mourdock (incumbent)	1,053,527	62.46%
Democratic	Pete Buttigieg	633,243	37.54%
Total votes		1,686,770	

=== Auditor ===
Indiana State Auditor election, 2010
- November 2, 2010
- Turnout: 39.04%
Nominee	Tim Berry	Sam Locke
Party	Republican	Democratic
Popular vote	986,301	625,630
Percentage	58.36%	37.02%
- County results Berry: 40–50% 50–60% 60–70% 70–80% Locke: 40–50% 50–60%
Auditor before election
Tim Berry
Republican
Elected Auditor
Tim Berry
Republican

Incumbent Republican Auditor Tim Berry ran for reelection. He faced Democrat Sam Locke and Libertarian Eric Knipe in the general election. At the time, no Democrat had won a State Auditor election in 28 years.

Locke was a first-time candidate for office. He was a former United States Air Force officer and a current non-profit consultant from Floyds Knobs. He was unchallenged for the Democratic nomination.

Locke pledged that, if elected, he would direct more state contracts to Indiana-based businesses. Locke promised to find ways to save the state money. Locke pledged to closely analyze state finances and attack wasteful spending. He also promised to audit automatic payments made by the state to ensure that duplicate payments were not being made. He also expressed an interest in making state transactions available and searchable in an online system. Locke's campaign placed an emphasis on job-creation. Locke promised that he would implement a more vigorous accounts payable and contract audit process. He also promised to advocate for "top-down government reform", promising to advocate for consolidation of the agencies involved in financial planning at the state level. He pledged to increase the usage of electronic records, phasing out the use of microfiche for record keeping. He pledged to increase the accessibility of public information. He also pledged that he would collaborate with other state officials to more accurately project the state's finances, arguing that a more "proactive approach" would negate the need for spending cuts proposed by the administration of Governor Mitch Daniels. Locke also proposed implementing third-party recovery audits. He promised to use the Auditor's office to cut "wasteful spending".

==== Endorsements ====
Sam Locke (D)

Organizations

- AFL–CIO
- Indiana State Teachers Association
Tim Berry (R)

Newspapers

- Fort Wayne Journal Gazette

==== Results ====
Berry won reelection with 58% of the vote to Locke's 37%.

General election results
Party	Candidate	Votes	%
Republican	Tim Berry	986,301	58.36%
Democratic	Sam Locke	625,630	37.02%
Libertarian	Eric Knipe	78,004	4.62%
Total votes		1,689,935	

=== State Senate ===
25 seats in the Indiana Senate were up for election in 2010, a majority of which were won by the Republicans.

=== State House of Representatives ===
All 100 seats in the Indiana House of Representatives were up for election in 2010. A large majority of these were seized by the Republicans, giving them legislative dominance, but not enough to meet quorum without Democratic attendance.

=== Judicial positions ===
Multiple judicial positions were up for election in 2010.

=== Ballot measures ===
One statewide ballot measure was certified:

1. Add a property tax cap amendment to the Indiana Constitution

The measure passed at the polls, with 28% of voters against the proposition.

== Local ==
Many elections for county offices were also held on November 2, 2010.
