= 2022 Indiana Secretary of State election =

- November 8, 2022
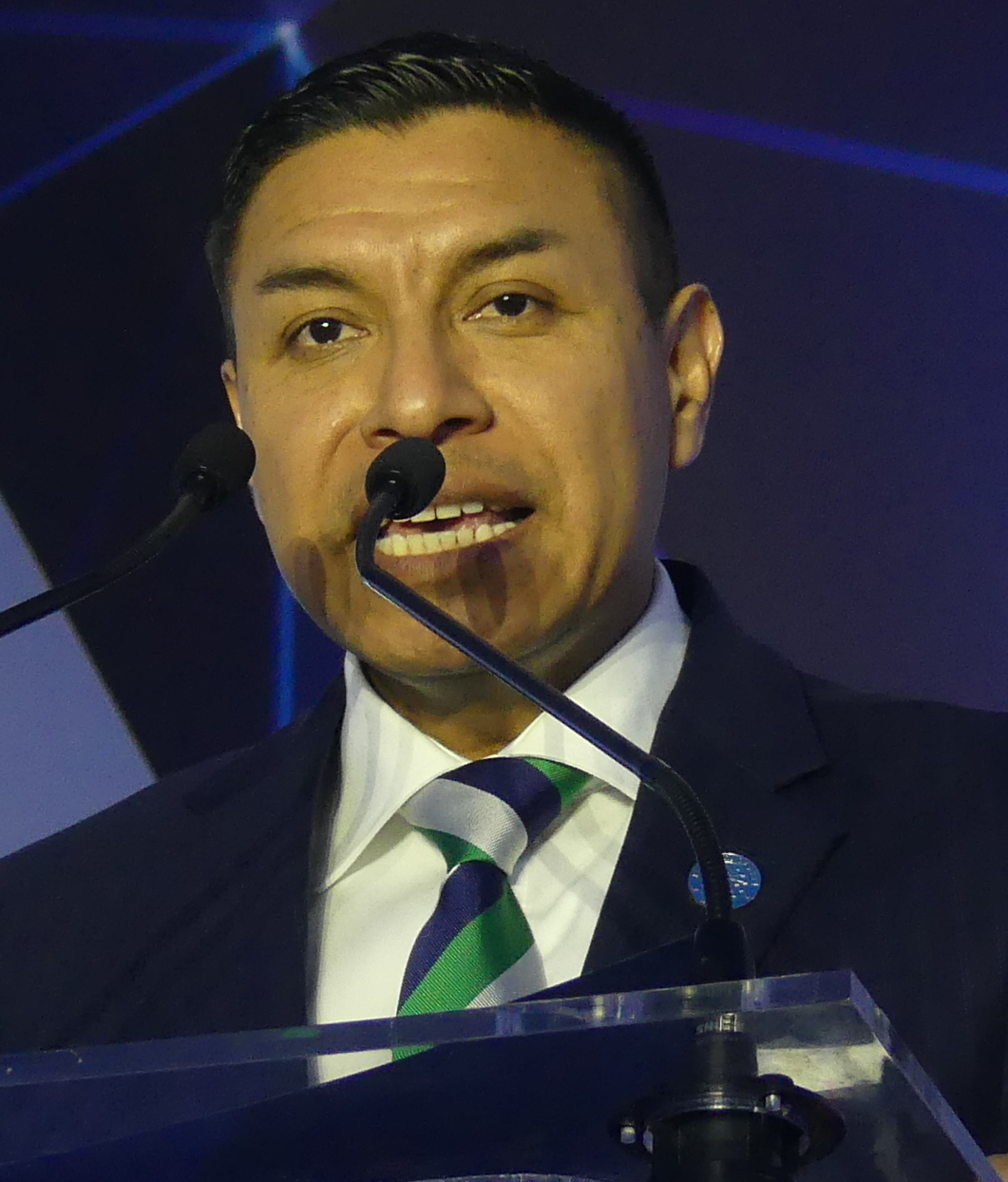

| Nominee | Diego Morales | Destiny Wells | Jeff Maurer |
| Party | Republican | Democratic | Libertarian |
| Popular vote | 999,893 | 742,624 | 104,519 |
| Percentage | 54.13% | 40.21% | 5.66% |
- Morales: 40–50% 50–60% 60–70% 70–80% Wells: 40–50% 50–60% 60–70%
Secretary of State before election
Holli Sullivan
Republican
Elected Secretary of State
Diego Morales
Republican

The 2022 Indiana Secretary of State election took place on November 8, 2022, to elect the next secretary of state of Indiana. Holli Sullivan, a Republican who was appointed to replace Connie Lawson as Secretary of State in 2021, ran for a full term in office but was defeated at the Republican convention by Diego Morales. The Democratic, Republican, and Libertarian parties chose their nominees for Secretary of State at a party convention on June 18, 2022.

Despite Indiana's strong Republican lean, polls showed a competitive race. Republican nominee Diego Morales faced numerous controversies, including the fact that he was previously fired from a position in the Secretary of State office; his echoing of Donald Trump's false accusations of fraud in the 2020 elections; his use of campaign funds to purchase a $43,000 Toyota RAV4; his description of himself as a "veteran" even though he only served in the military for three months and he was in the Indiana Army National Guard and never deployed on Active Duty (the federal definition of a "veteran" only includes active duty or guardsmen who have deployed on active duty orders); claims that portions of his resume are exaggerated or misleading; and two accusations of sexual harassment against him. After winning the Republican nomination, he changed his stance on the 2020 presidential election, telling The Washington Post that he believed Biden won legitimately. WTHR commented that Morales received the most negative press of any statewide candidate in Indiana since Richard Mourdock in the 2012 Senate race.

Despite Morales's controversies, he secured a decisive victory over Wells and Maurer. However, he underperformed all other statewide Republican nominees in Indiana by 5-7 percentage points.

== Republican convention ==
Incumbent Secretary of State Connie Lawson resigned in 2021 due to health issues. Governor Eric Holcomb chose state representative Holli Sullivan to replace her, and Sullivan announced she would run for a full term. The Republican campaign for Secretary of State was the most expensive in two decades, with challenger Diego Morales leading Sullivan in fundraising. Morales was endorsed by the America First Secretary of State Coalition, a conservative group that supported a slate of candidates in the 2022 United States secretary of state elections.

=== Candidates ===
==== Nominee ====
- Diego Morales, former aide to governor Mike Pence and candidate for Indiana's 4th congressional district in 2018

==== Eliminated at convention ====
- Paul Hager, perennial candidate
- David Shelton, Knox County clerk
- Holli Sullivan, incumbent secretary of state

==== Did not file ====
- Kyle Conrad, Newton County commissioner

=== Endorsements ===
Diego Morales

Organizations

- America First Secretary of State Coalition

== Democratic convention ==
=== Candidates ===
==== Nominee ====
- Destiny Wells, attorney, lieutenant colonel in the U.S. Army Reserve, deputy chair of the Indiana Democratic Party, and former deputy attorney general

=== Endorsements ===
Destiny Wells

Local officials

- Joe Hogsett, 49th Mayor of Indianapolis, former U.S. Attorney for the Southern District of Indiana and 57th Indiana Secretary of State

Labor unions

- Indiana AFL–CIO
- IUOE Local 150

Organizations

- Indiana Democratic Party
- VoteVets

Newspapers

- The Herald Bulletin

== Libertarian convention ==
=== Nominee ===
- Jeff Maurer, entrepreneur

== Write-in candidates ==
- David Wetterer, Green Party
- Andrew Straw, Disability Party

== General election ==
=== Debate ===
On October 10, a debate for the Secretary of State election was held by WFYI and the League of Women Voters. Democrat Destiny Wells and Libertarian Jeff Maurer participated in the debate, while Morales skipped it to attend a meeting of the Warrick County Republican Party. Wells and Maurer heavily criticized Morales for not attending the debate. While both agreed that Joe Biden won the 2020 presidential election, Maurer called for an election audit of every Indiana county, while Wells did not. When asked about the problem of low voter turnout, Wells proposed independent redistricting, keeping polling places open longer, and extending the window for early voting as ways to increase turnout, while Maurer blamed the two-party system for creating a lack of competition.

2022 Indiana Secretary of State debate
| No. | Date | Host | Moderator | Link | Republican | Democratic | Libertarian |
| Key: P Participant A Absent N Not invited I Invited W Withdrawn | | | | | | | |
| Key: P Participant A Absent N Not invited I Invited W Withdrawn | | | | | Diego Morales | Destiny Wells | Jeff Maurer |
|---|---|---|---|---|---|---|---|
| 1 | Oct. 25, 2022 | WFYI; League of Women Voters of Indiana | Laura Wilson | PBS | A | P | P |

=== Predictions ===
| Source | Ranking | As of |
|---|---|---|
| Sabato's Crystal Ball | Tossup | November 3, 2022 |
| Elections Daily | Likely R | November 7, 2022 |

=== Polling ===
| Poll source | Date(s) administered | Sample size (Note: Key: A – all adults RV – registered voters LV – likely voters V – unclear) | Margin of error | Diego Morales (R) | Destiny Wells (D) | Jeff Maurer (L) | Undecided |
|---|---|---|---|---|---|---|---|
| Indy Politics/ARW Strategies (R) | September 25–26, 2022 | 600 (LV) | ± 4.0% | 32% | 36% | 7% | 25% |
| Indy Politics/ARW Strategies (R) | July 19–21, 2022 | 800 (LV) | ± 3.5% | 28% | 31% | 7% | 34% |

=== Results ===
2022 Indiana Secretary of State election
| Party | Candidate | Votes | % | ±% |
|---|---|---|---|---|
| Republican | Diego Morales | 999,893 | 54.13% | −2.09% |
| Democratic | Destiny Wells | 742,624 | 40.21% | −0.36% |
| Libertarian | Jeff Maurer | 104,519 | 5.66% | +2.49% |
| Green | David Wetterer (write-in) | 107 | 0.00% | −0.02% |
| Disability | Andrew Straw (write-in) | 36 | 0.00% | new |
| Total votes | | 1,847,179 | 100.00% | N/A |
| Republican hold | | | | |

==== By county ====
| County | Diego Morales Republican | | Destiny Wells Democratic | | Jeff Maurer Libertarian | | Write-ins | |
| County | Votes | % | Votes | % | Votes | % | Votes | % |
|---|---|---|---|---|---|---|---|---|
| Adams | 6,497 | 73.2% | 2,081 | 23.4% | 298 | 3.4% | 0 | 0.00% |
| Allen | 55,203 | 54.7% | 41,911 | 41.5% | 3,883 | 3.8% | 2 | 0.0% |
| Bartholomew | 12,544 | 56.0% | 8,180 | 36.5% | 1,665 | 7.4% | 0 | 0.00% |
| Benton | 1,884 | 76.4% | 498 | 20.2% | 85 | 3.4% | 0 | 0.0% |
| Blackford | 2,221 | 66.3% | 896 | 26.8% | 231 | 6.9% | 0 | 0.0% |
| Boone | 12,293 | 49.9% | 9,953 | 40.4% | 2,395 | 9.7% | 0 | 0.0% |
| Brown | 3,329 | 52.9% | 2,276 | 36.1% | 691 | 11.0% | 1 | 0.0% |
| Carroll | 4,353 | 70.3% | 1,431 | 23.1% | 411 | 6.6% | 0 | 0.0% |
| Cass | 5,611 | 65.7% | 2,504 | 29.3% | 417 | 4.9% | 2 | 0.0% |
| Clark | 20,826 | 57.9% | 13,855 | 38.5% | 1,306 | 3.6% | 2 | 0.0% |
| Clay | 5,393 | 71.2% | 1,692 | 22.4% | 485 | 6.4% | 0 | 0.0% |
| Clinton | 4,904 | 68.0% | 1,820 | 25.2% | 485 | 6.7% | 0 | 0.0% |
| Crawford | 2,296 | 64.2% | 1,129 | 31.5% | 154 | 4.3% | 0 | 0.00% |
| Daviess | 5,509 | 79.4% | 1,190 | 17.1% | 242 | 3.5% | 0 | 0.0% |
| Dearborn | 11,104 | 77.9% | 2,720 | 19.1% | 438 | 3.1% | 0 | 0.0% |
| Decatur | 5,437 | 68.4% | 1,684 | 21.2% | 833 | 10.5% | 0 | 0.0% |
| DeKalb | 8,022 | 69.1% | 3,048 | 26.3% | 540 | 4.7% | 1 | 0.0% |
| Delaware | 15,228 | 51.1% | 12,850 | 43.1% | 1,751 | 5.9% | 0 | 0.0% |
| Dubois | 8,956 | 66.7% | 3,945 | 29.4% | 526 | 3.9% | 0 | 0.0% |
| Elkhart | 29,354 | 65.9% | 13,515 | 30.3% | 1,700 | 3.8% | 3 | 0.0% |
| Fayette | 4,330 | 70.9% | 1,484 | 24.3% | 296 | 4.8% | 0 | 0.0% |
| Floyd | 14,926 | 56.0% | 10,891 | 40.8% | 852 | 3.2% | 3 | 0.0% |
| Fountain | 3,680 | 74.3% | 1,039 | 21.0% | 231 | 4.7% | 0 | 0.0% |
| Franklin | 5,638 | 77.2% | 1,326 | 18.2% | 340 | 4.7% | 0 | 0.0% |
| Fulton | 3,797 | 69.0% | 1,522 | 27.7% | 180 | 3.3% | 0 | 0.0% |
| Gibson | 7,162 | 71.0% | 2,522 | 25.0% | 410 | 4.1% | 0 | 0.0% |
| Grant | 10,575 | 67.5% | 4,325 | 27.6% | 766 | 4.9% | 3 | 0.0% |
| Greene | 6,554 | 70.3% | 2,270 | 24.3% | 505 | 5.4% | 0 | 0.0% |
| Hamilton | 61,478 | 47.9% | 56,160 | 43.8% | 10,715 | 8.3% | 4 | 0.0% |
| Hancock | 13,599 | 57.2% | 7,378 | 31.0% | 2,806 | 11.8% | 2 | 0.0% |
| Harrison | 9,603 | 69.8% | 3,711 | 27.0% | 450 | 3.3% | 0 | 0.0% |
| Hendricks | 25,454 | 52.6% | 17,765 | 36.7% | 5,129 | 10.6% | 0 | 0.0% |
| Henry | 8,220 | 61.4% | 3,891 | 29.1% | 1,283 | 9.6% | 0 | 0.0% |
| Howard | 15,126 | 61.3% | 8,115 | 32.9% | 1,427 | 5.8% | 0 | 0.00% |
| Huntington | 7,953 | 70.8% | 2,824 | 25.1% | 457 | 4.1% | 0 | 0.0% |
| Jackson | 7,974 | 71.4% | 2,550 | 22.8% | 646 | 5.8% | 0 | 0.0% |
| Jasper | 6,920 | 75.0% | 2,019 | 21.9% | 285 | 3.1% | 0 | 0.0% |
| Jay | 3,740 | 69.8% | 1,366 | 25.5% | 254 | 4.7% | 1 | 0.0% |
| Jefferson | 6,043 | 62.3% | 3,290 | 33.9% | 372 | 3.8% | 0 | 0.0% |
| Jennings | 5,429 | 69.2% | 1,758 | 22.4% | 663 | 8.4% | 0 | 0.0% |
| Johnson | 25,935 | 58.1% | 14,340 | 32.1% | 4,342 | 9.7% | 3 | 0.0% |
| Knox | 6,846 | 68.6% | 2,683 | 26.9% | 449 | 4.5% | 0 | 0.0% |
| Kosciusko | 16,553 | 73.6% | 4,687 | 20.8% | 1,250 | 5.6% | 0 | 0.0% |
| LaGrange | 4,884 | 74.6% | 1,373 | 21.0% | 288 | 4.4% | 1 | 0.0% |
| Lake | 58,356 | 44.0% | 70,412 | 53.1% | 3,793 | 2.9% | 7 | 0.0% |
| LaPorte | 16,486 | 52.0% | 13,833 | 43.6% | 1,405 | 4.4% | 0 | 0.0% |
| Lawrence | 9,030 | 71.5% | 2,896 | 22.9% | 703 | 5.6% | 0 | 0.0% |
| Madison | 18,740 | 52.7% | 14,140 | 39.7% | 2,693 | 7.6% | 1 | 0.0% |
| Marion | 66,021 | 29.6% | 141,777 | 63.6% | 15,160 | 6.8% | 39 | 0.0% |
| Marshall | 8,743 | 69.1% | 3,378 | 26.7% | 539 | 4.3% | 1 | 0.0% |
| Martin | 2,397 | 70.6% | 801 | 23.6% | 199 | 5.9% | 0 | 0.00% |
| Miami | 6,156 | 72.6% | 1,923 | 22.7% | 398 | 4.7% | 0 | 0.0% |
| Monroe | 12,706 | 31.9% | 25,280 | 63.4% | 1,887 | 4.7% | 11 | 0.00% |
| Montgomery | 6,443 | 66.4% | 2,496 | 25.7% | 757 | 7.8% | 1 | 0.0% |
| Morgan | 13,522 | 64.0% | 5,096 | 24.1% | 2,508 | 11.9% | 1 | 0.0% |
| Newton | 2,946 | 74.7% | 825 | 20.9% | 174 | 4.4% | 0 | 0.0% |
| Noble | 8,227 | 72.0% | 2,696 | 23.6% | 503 | 4.4% | 0 | 0.0% |
| Ohio | 1,448 | 73.8% | 463 | 23.6% | 50 | 2.6% | 0 | 0.0% |
| Orange | 3,896 | 72.8% | 1,292 | 24.2% | 160 | 3.0% | 0 | 0.0% |
| Owen | 3,849 | 62.9% | 1,680 | 27.5% | 587 | 9.6% | 0 | 0.0% |
| Parke | 3,212 | 72.5% | 992 | 22.4% | 226 | 5.1% | 0 | 0.0% |
| Perry | 3,424 | 55.6% | 2,516 | 40.9% | 219 | 3.6% | 0 | 0.0% |
| Pike | 2,618 | 72.1% | 882 | 24.3% | 131 | 3.6% | 0 | 0.0% |
| Porter | 29,969 | 51.9% | 25,916 | 44.9% | 1,880 | 3.3% | 11 | 0.0% |
| Posey | 5,854 | 67.8% | 2,414 | 27.9% | 366 | 4.2% | 3 | 0.0% |
| Pulaski | 2,633 | 71.4% | 903 | 24.5% | 151 | 4.1% | 0 | 0.0% |
| Putnam | 6,257 | 63.4% | 2,583 | 26.2% | 1,023 | 10.4% | 0 | 0.0% |
| Randolph | 4,830 | 70.8% | 1,619 | 23.7% | 371 | 5.4% | 0 | 0.0% |
| Ripley | 6,326 | 76.0% | 1,573 | 18.9% | 420 | 5.0% | 0 | 0.0% |
| Rush | 3,111 | 64.6% | 1,164 | 24.2% | 544 | 11.3% | 0 | 0.0% |
| St. Joseph | 33,748 | 47.4% | 34,746 | 48.8% | 2,654 | 3.7% | 5 | 0.0% |
| Scott | 4,155 | 62.2% | 2,236 | 33.5% | 287 | 4.3% | 0 | 0.0% |
| Shelby | 7,067 | 61.7% | 3,109 | 27.1% | 1,280 | 11.2% | 0 | 0.0% |
| Spencer | 4,900 | 65.1% | 2,381 | 31.6% | 245 | 3.3% | 1 | 0.0% |
| Starke | 4,579 | 67.5% | 1,885 | 27.8% | 317 | 4.7% | 0 | 0.0% |
| Steuben | 6,559 | 68.0% | 2,692 | 27.9% | 392 | 4.1% | 0 | 0.0% |
| Sullivan | 3,987 | 64.3% | 1,837 | 29.6% | 378 | 6.1% | 0 | 0.0% |
| Switzerland | 1,849 | 70.7% | 666 | 25.5% | 101 | 3.9% | 0 | 0.0% |
| Tippecanoe | 18,324 | 47.7% | 18,485 | 48.1% | 1,608 | 4.2% | 10 | 0.0% |
| Tipton | 3,331 | 64.3% | 1,386 | 26.8% | 462 | 8.9% | 0 | 0.0% |
| Union | 1,742 | 72.0% | 532 | 22.0% | 144 | 6.0% | 0 | 0.0% |
| Vanderburgh | 25,221 | 53.9% | 19,899 | 42.6% | 1,631 | 3.5% | 2 | 0.0% |
| Vermillion | 3,012 | 60.7% | 1,705 | 34.4% | 243 | 4.9% | 0 | 0.0% |
| Vigo | 13,444 | 50.9% | 11,773 | 44.6% | 1,205 | 4.6% | 4 | 0.0% |
| Wabash | 7,071 | 72.5% | 2,253 | 23.1% | 431 | 4.4% | 2 | 0.0% |
| Warren | 2,077 | 74.4% | 596 | 21.4% | 117 | 4.2% | 0 | 0.0% |
| Warrick | 12,722 | 63.7% | 6,605 | 33.1% | 630 | 3.2% | 7 | 0.0% |
| Washington | 5,739 | 72.4% | 1,880 | 23.7% | 309 | 3.9% | 0 | 0.0% |
| Wayne | 10,091 | 61.0% | 5,465 | 33.0% | 988 | 6.0% | 5 | 0.0% |
| Wells | 6,797 | 75.0% | 1,882 | 20.8% | 389 | 4.3% | 0 | 0.0% |
| White | 4,626 | 69.2% | 1,778 | 26.6% | 281 | 4.2% | 1 | 0.0% |
| Whitley | 8,055 | 70.4% | 2,746 | 24.0% | 632 | 5.5% | 3 | 0.0% |

Counties that flipped from Democratic to Republican

- LaPorte (largest city: Michigan City)
- Porter (largest city: Portage)

Counties that flipped from Republican to Democratic

- Tippecanoe (largest city: Lafayette)

==== By congressional district ====
Morales won seven of nine congressional districts.

| District | Morales | Wells | Maurer | Representative |
|---|---|---|---|---|
| 1st | 47% | 50% | 3% | Frank J. Mrvan |
| 2nd | 61% | 35% | 4% | Rudy Yakym |
| 3rd | 63% | 33% | 4% | Jim Banks |
| 4th | 58% | 34% | 8% | Jim Baird |
| 5th | 52% | 41% | 7% | Victoria Spartz |
| 6th | 57% | 34% | 9% | Greg Pence |
| 7th | 24% | 70% | 6% | André Carson |
| 8th | 63% | 33% | 4% | Larry Bucshon |
| 9th | 60% | 36% | 5% | Trey Hollingsworth (117th Congress) |
| 9th | 60% | 36% | 5% | Erin Houchin (118th Congress) |
