= Diego Morales (politician) =

American politician (born 1979)

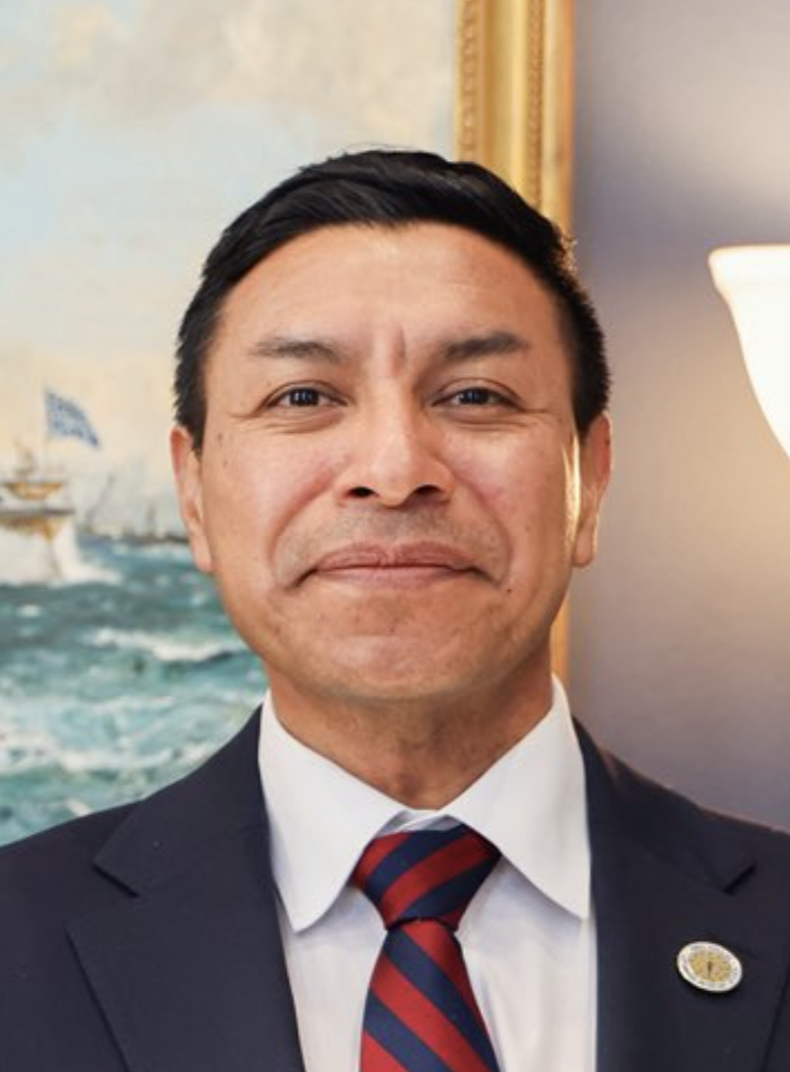
- Morales in 2026

63rd Secretary of State of Indiana
- Incumbent
- Assumed office January 1, 2023
- Governor: Eric Holcomb; Mike Braun
- Preceded by: Holli Sullivan

Personal details
- Born: February 15, 1979 (age 47) Guatemala
- Party: Republican
- Spouse: Sidonia Nicolae
- Education: Indiana University, Southeast (BA); Purdue University (MBA)

Military service
- Allegiance: United States
- Branch/service: United States Army
- Unit: Indiana Army National Guard

Diego Morales (born February 15, 1979) is a Guatemalan-American politician serving as the secretary of state of Indiana since 2023. He is a member of the Republican Party.

Morales was born in Guatemala and immigrated to the United States with his family while in high school. He earned a bachelor's degree from Indiana University Southeast in 2004, and later received an MBA from Purdue University in 2012. He enlisted in the U.S. Army in 2007, served briefly on active duty, and later worked in the Indiana secretary of state's office under Todd Rokita and Charlie White before serving as an adviser to then-governor Mike Pence. In 2018, he ran to represent Indiana's 4th congressional district in Congress.

Morales was first elected secretary of state of Indiana in 2022. He was the only candidate backed by the America First Secretary of State Coalition that year to win an election. He lost the Republican convention in 2026 to Max Engling.

== Early life and career ==
Morales was born in Guatemala, and immigrated to the United States with his family when he was in high school. He graduated from Silver Creek High School in Sellersburg, Indiana, and earned his bachelor's degree from Indiana University Southeast in 2004. He enlisted in the United States Army in 2007, where he was on active duty for three months and 18 days. He transferred to the Indiana National Guard, but did not complete the eight-year commitment.

Morales worked for the office of the Secretary of State of Indiana, Todd Rokita. He was fired in 2009, which the office explained as due to his work being "incomplete", with "inefficient execution" and a "lack of focus". He took another job in the secretary of state's office, under Charles P. White in 2011, but was fired after a month for "poor execution" and not completing his work.

Morales earned a Master of Business Administration from Purdue University in 2012.

== Political career ==
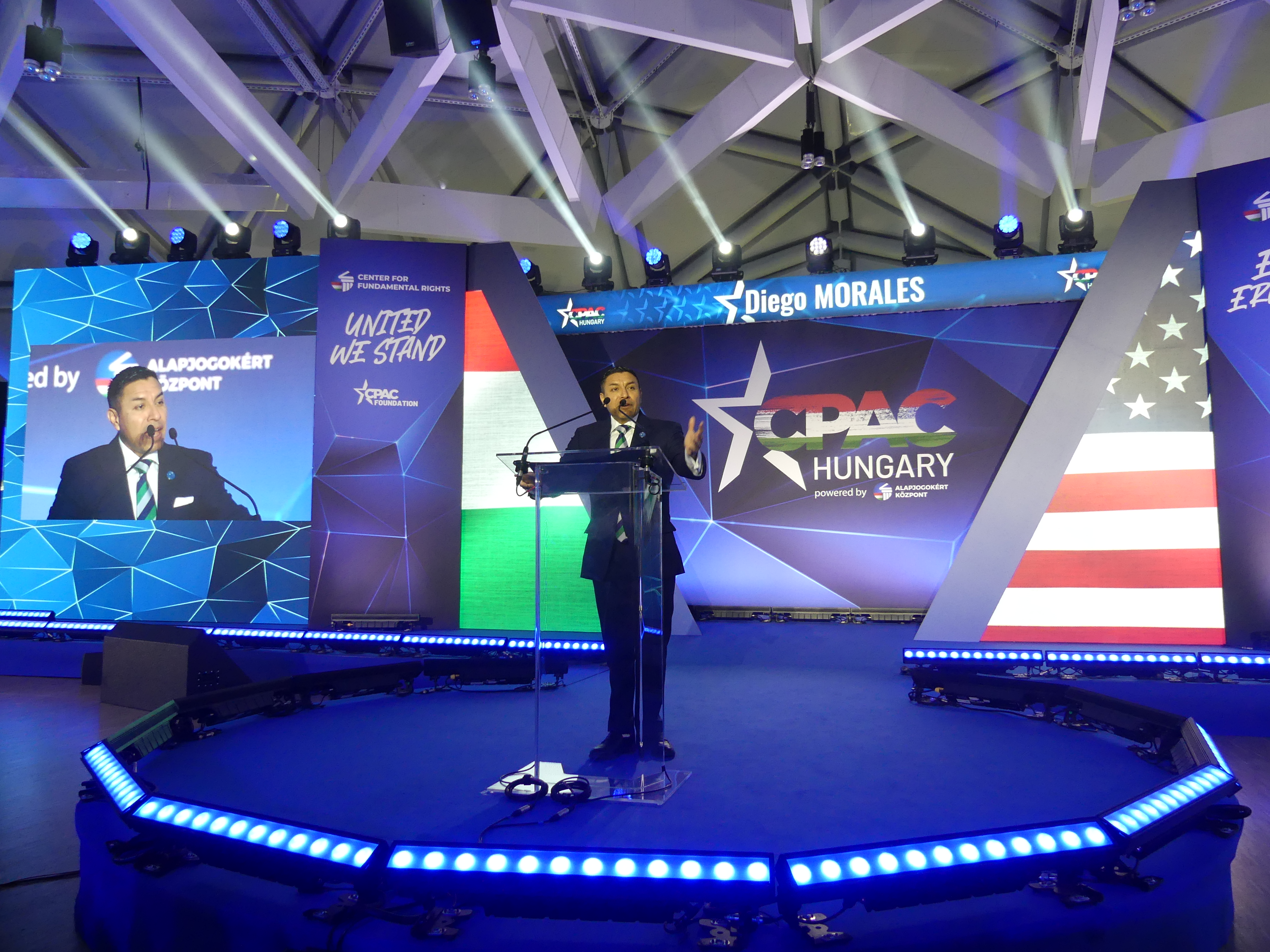
Addressing CPAC Hungary 2023

Morales served as an advisor to Governor Mike Pence.

In 2018, then-U.S. Representative Rokita ran for the United States Senate, and Morales ran in the 2018 election for the United States House of Representatives for Indiana's 4th congressional district. During the campaign, Morales was accused of exaggerating his political and military experience. He finished third out of six candidates in the Republican primary election, behind the winner, Jim Baird, and Steve Braun.

Morales declared his candidacy in the 2022 Indiana Secretary of State election. He defeated Holli Sullivan, the incumbent, at the Republican nominating convention in a major upset. During the campaign, Morales was criticized for using campaign funds to purchase a $43,000 Toyota RAV4 and describing himself as a "veteran" even though he only served in the military for three months and he was in the Indiana Army National Guard and never deployed on active duty (the federal definition of a "veteran" only includes Active Duty service) Morales joined the America First Secretary of State Coalition, a coalition of secretary of state candidates who endorsed President Donald Trump's false claims of voter fraud in the 2020 presidential election. After winning the Republican nomination, he changed his stance on the 2020 presidential election, telling The Washington Post that he believed Biden won legitimately. WTHR commented that Morales received the most negative press of any statewide candidate in Indiana since Richard Mourdock in the 2012 Senate race.

Morales defeated Destiny Wells, the Democratic Party nominee, in the November 8 general election. He was the only "America First" coalition candidate to win election in 2022. Although Morales won by a large margin, he underperformed all other statewide Republican nominees in Indiana by 5–7 percentage points.

=== Tenure as Secretary of State ===
Morales's tenure has been highly scrutinized. He hired his brother-in-law at a salary of $108,000. In 2023, his office gave a spot bonus to nearly every employee in his office for a total of $308,000. The office gave numerous no-bid contracts to companies that donated to his campaign. He has taken two international trips to India and Hungary. His office claimed he was on an economic development trip in India, despite economic development not being a duty of the Secretary of State. In Hungary, Morales claimed he was on "personal time", yet he visited with government officials in the country. Morales purchased a GMC Yukon Denali for $90,000 with taxpayer funds from a dealership that donated $65,000 to Morales's campaign.

In May 2025, the Marion County Election Board announced they are investigating Morales over a re-election video for his 2026 campaign, in which the ad featured footage of Morales taken during an official visit to the Marion County Election Service Center.

In June 2026, at the Indiana GOP convention, Morales lost the nomination to be the republican nominee for Secretary of State in the 2026 election. He finished third behind Max Engling and David Shelton.

== Personal life ==
Morales met his wife, Sidonia Nicolae, while studying in Europe. She immigrated to the United States and they married in 2013. He has an adult daughter.

Two women have accused Morales of sexually assaulting them. Morales denied their accusations.

Party political offices
Preceded by Connie Lawson	Republican nominee for Secretary of State of Indiana; 2022	Succeeded by Max Engling
Political offices
Preceded by Holli Sullivan	Secretary of State of Indiana; 2023–present	Incumbent
