= Jerry Bonnet =

American politician

Secretary of State of Indiana Interim
- In office February 4, 2012 – March 16, 2012
- Governor: Mitch Daniels
- Preceded by: Charlie White
- Succeeded by: Connie Lawson

Personal details
- Party: Republican
- Education: Indiana University Bloomington (BA); University of Tennessee (JD); University of New Orleans (MBA); University of Texas at Dallas (MA)
- Profession: Lawyer

Jerold A. Bonnet is an American attorney who served as interim Secretary of State of Indiana in 2012. Bonnet was the deputy Secretary when his superior Charlie White lost his position after being convicted of voter fraud, leading Governor Mitch Daniels to appoint Bonnet as White's interim successor on February 4, 2012. After a month in office, Bonnet was succeeded by Connie Lawson on March 16. Bonnet served as the chief legal counsel in Lawson's administration.

== Early life and education ==
After graduating from Yorktown High School, Bonnet earned a BA from Indiana University Bloomington, Juris Doctor from the University of Tennessee, an MBA from the University of New Orleans, and a Masters in International Business and Finance from the University of Texas at Dallas.

== Career ==
Spending eighteen years practicing commercial law in Texas and Louisiana, Bonnet settled in New Orleans in 1999 and managed a private legal practice.

When Hurricane Katrina hit, Bonnet and his family evacuated to Indianapolis. Having relatives there, he intended the move to be "temporary", and became the interim chief counsel in the office of then-Secretary of State Todd Rokita on November 15, 2005. Nevertheless, the appointment became permanent. Whilst counsel, Bonnet helped implement the state's new photo ID law, as well as the Help America Vote Act. During the 2007 to 2010 primary and general election seasons, he served as the state's coordinator of polling day monitoring. In 2009, for his work in representing victims of domestic violence, he was honored by the Indiana Protective Order Pro-Bono Project.

Originally the deputy Secretary of State for parts of 2008 and 2009, Secretary of State Charlie White appointed Bonnet again to be second-in-command, as well as chief of staff, on March 14, 2011. At the time, Bonnet was on the Comprehensive HIV Services Planning and Advisory Council, and the Indiana Code Revision Commission. On the eve of his ascension to the secretaryship, he was working on a doctorate in organizational leadership at Indiana Wesleyan University.

=== Secretary of State ===
On February 4, 2012, White was removed from office after being convicted of voter fraud. Governor Mitch Daniels proceeded to appoint Bonnet to the post on an interim basis, pending the chance White's conviction was downgraded to a misdemeanor, or otherwise until Daniels made a permanent appointment. After his appointment, Bonnet was identified as a Republican. Around three weeks later, White's felony conviction was upheld, though succession continued to be delayed by a legal challenge from White's Democratic opponent in the secretaryship election of 2010, arguing he should assume the office. This challenge was dismissed on March 15. With Daniels now free to choose, some speculation arose that Bonnet could carry on fully, with a commentator in The Indianapolis Star arguing he would be the least political choice and noting the governor's praise of Bonnet's performance, though others argued his lack of political experience would make him an unlikely selection, and Bonnet made no public suggestion he desired to retain the position. The following day, state senator Connie Lawson succeeded Bonnet.

Upon Lawson's appointment as secretary, Bonnet's duties as deputy secretary and chief of staff were conferred to Davey Neal. He went on to serve as chief legal counsel within Lawson's administration.

== Personal life ==
Bonnet is married with three children.
