= Joe Pearson (politician) =

American politician

Member of the Indiana House of Representatives from the 31st district
- In office January 2009 – January 2011
- Preceded by: Tim Harris
- Succeeded by: Kevin Mahan

Personal details
- Party: Democratic
- Education: Purdue University, Ball State University
- Occupation: Grain farmer, public administration

Joe Pearson was a member of the Indiana House of Representatives, representing the 31st District from 2009 to 2011. He was a member of the Democratic Party.

Pearson farmed full-time until March 1995, when Governor Evan Bayh and Lieutenant Governor Frank O'Bannon named him Assistant Commissioner of Agriculture. He continued to serve in the same capacity after O’Bannon was elected to succeed Bayh, and, after O'Bannon's death in office, under Governor Joe Kernan, until 2005. He ran unsuccessfully for Secretary of State of Indiana in 2006.

Party political offices
Preceded by John Fernandez	Democratic nominee for Secretary of State of Indiana; 2006	Succeeded by Vop Osili
