= 2006 Indiana elections =

Indiana elections, 2006
- November 7th, 2006

The 2006 Indiana Elections was held on November 7, 2006, as part of the 2006 midterm elections. Republicans maintained their Indiana Senate seat, Democrats retook the majority in the congressional delegation but maintained a hold on all statewide offices up for election

== United States Senate ==
Incumbent Richard Lugar did not face an opponent from the Democratic Party, and faced Libertarian Steve Osborne Exit polls and polling data showed that he would win by a huge margin - which he did. Lugar got 87.3% of the vote. This seat would be up for contention again in 6 years.

== United States House of Representatives ==
Going into this election, the Republicans had the majority of this congressional delegation, 7–2. But after the events of this election, Republicans lost 3 seats, reducing their number of seats to 4. Democrats retook the majority in this congressional delegation. Combined with the Democratic wave year, Democrats won a lot of the seats up for grabs.

== State Secretary of State ==
Incumbent Republican Todd Rokita faced strong opposition from Joe Pearson (former Assistant Commissioner of Agriculture under Governors Evan Bayh, Frank O'Bannon, and Joe Kernan). He won with 51% of the vote, while his Democratic Challenger Joe Pearson got 45% of the vote.

Results by county Rokita: 40–50%; 50–60%; 60–70%; 70–80%; Pearson: 40–50%; 50–60%; 60–70%

== State Auditor ==
Term-limited Republican State Treasurer Tim Berry went against Democrat Judy Anderson. He won with 51.1% of the vote.

Results by county Berry: 50–60%; 60–70%; 70–80%; Anderson: 50–60%; 60–70%

== State Treasurer ==
Due to the Incumbent Treasurer Tim Berry being term-limited, the Republican Party nominated Richard Mourdock (former Commissioner of Vanderburgh County), and the Democrats nominated Michael Griffin. Republican Richard Mourdock won with 51.9% of the vote.

Results by county Mourdock: 50–60%; 60–70%; 70–80%; Griffin: 50–60%; 60–70%; 70–80%
