= 2018 Indiana elections =

- November 6, 2018

A general election was held in the U.S. state of Indiana on November 6, 2018. Three of Indiana's executive offices were up for election, as well as a United States Senate seat and all of Indiana's nine seats in the United States House of Representatives.

== Secretary of state ==
2018 Indiana Secretary of State election
- November 6, 2018
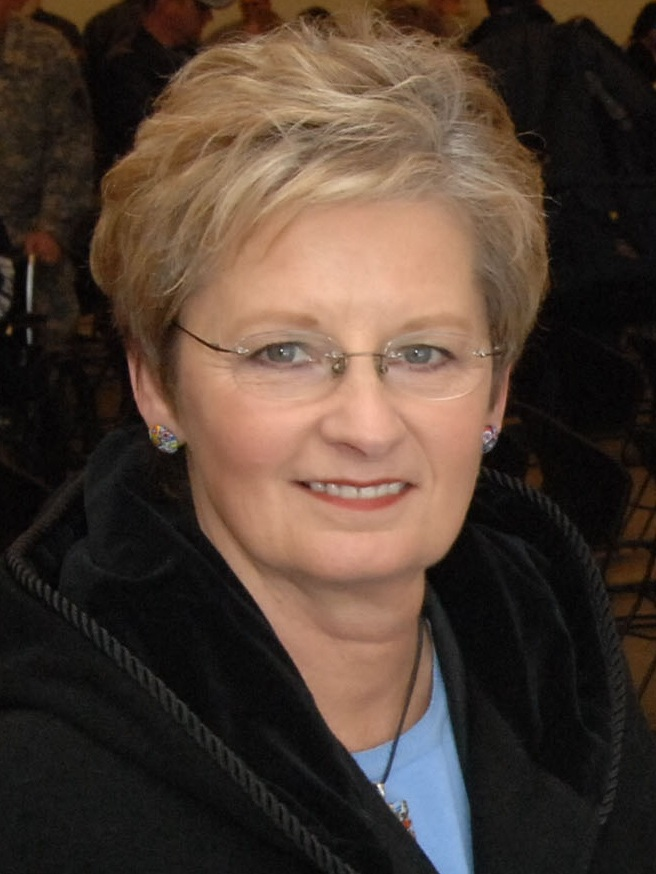

Nominee	Connie Lawson	Jim Harper
Party	Republican	Democratic
Popular vote	1,261,878	910,744
Percentage	56.2%	40.6%
- County results Lawson: 50–60% 60–70% 70–80% Harper: 40–50% 50–60% 60–70%
Secretary of State before election
Connie Lawson
Republican
Elected Secretary of State
Connie Lawson
Republican

Incumbent Republican secretary of state Connie Lawson, who was appointed to the office in 2012, ran for re-election to a second full term in office.

Jim Harper, an attorney and 2016 Democratic nominee for the state senate in the 5th District, sought the Democratic nomination. Potential Democratic candidates included Monroe County Councilwoman Shelli Yoder.

The Indiana Green Party nominated George Wolfe, a professor emeritus at Ball State University and former director of the Ball State University Center for Peace and Conflict Studies. The party had to collect 30,000 signatures to get George Wolfe on the ballot in November. The Libertarian Party nominee was Mark Rutherford, chairman of the Indiana Public Defender Commission and former vice chairman of the Libertarian National Committee.

The Pirate Party nominated Jeremy Heath.

=== Predictions ===
Source	Ranking	As of
Governing	Likely R	October 11, 2018

=== Polling ===
Poll source	Date(s) administered	Sample size	Margin of error	Connie Lawson (R)	Jim Harper (D)	Other	Undecided
Gravis Marketing	May 10–15, 2018	400	± 4.9%	33%	23%	14%	31%

=== Results ===
Indiana Secretary of State election, 2018
Party	Candidate	Votes	%
Republican	Connie Lawson (incumbent)	1,261,878	56.2
Democratic	Jim Harper	910,744	40.6
Libertarian	Mark Rutherford	71,179	3.2
Green	George William Wolfe (write-in)	374	0.2
Pirate	Jeremy Heath (write-in)	28	0.0
Majority		351,134	15.6
Total votes		2,244,203	100

== Treasurer ==
Indiana State Treasurer election, 2018
- November 6, 2018
Nominee	Kelly Mitchell	John C. Aguilera
Party	Republican	Democratic
Popular vote	1,300,631	910,744
Percentage	58.6%	41.4%
- County results Mitchell: 50–60% 60–70% 70–80% 80–90% Aguilera: 50–60% 60–70%
Treasurer before election
Kelly Mitchell
Republican
Elected Treasurer
Kelly Mitchell
Republican

Incumbent Republican state treasurer Kelly Mitchell ran for re-election to a second term in office.

Indiana State Treasurer election, 2018
Party	Candidate	Votes	%
Republican	Kelly Mitchell (incumbent)	1,300,631	58.6
Democratic	John C. Aguilera	910,744	41.4

== Auditor ==
Indiana Auditor election, 2018
- November 6, 2018
Nominee	Tera Klutz	Joselyn Whitticker
Party	Republican	Democratic
Popular vote	1,235,579	913,701
Percentage	55.5%	41.0%
- County results Klutz: 40–50% 50–60% 60–70% 70–80% Whitticker: 40–50% 50–60% 60–70%
Auditor before election
Tera Klutz
Republican
Elected Auditor
Tera Klutz
Republican

Incumbent Republican state auditor Tera Klutz was appointed to the office on January 9, 2017, to replace Republican Suzanne Crouch, who was elected lieutenant governor. Klutz ran for election to a first full term.

Indiana State Auditor election, 2018
Party	Candidate	Votes	%
Republican	Tera Klutz (incumbent)	1,235,579	55.5
Democratic	Joselyn Whitticker	913,701	41.0
Libertarian	John Schick	77,101	3.5
