= Tim Harris (Indiana politician) =

American politician

Timothy W. Harris

Member of the Indiana House of Representatives from the 31st district
- In office November 3, 2004 – November 5, 2008
- Preceded by: Dean A. Young
- Succeeded by: Joe Pearson

Personal details
- Party: Republican
- Spouse: Dianne
- Education: Indiana Wesleyan University (BS)

Timothy W. Harris is an American politician from the state of Indiana. A member of the Republican Party, he previously served in the Indiana House of Representatives from 2004 to 2008. He represented Grant County and Blackford County. He previously served as Chairman of the Grant County Republican Party from 1997 to 2001. He previously served as an Administrative Assistant to the Mayor of Marion from 1994 to 1995 and a Member of the Indiana Republican Platform Committee from 2000 to 2002. In 2010, Harris was chosen as Chief of Staff for Congressman Marlin Stutzman. In 2013, Harris was named Associate Vice President of Sales and Marketing for Ivy Tech Corporate College.
