= Connie Lawson =

American politician (born 1949)

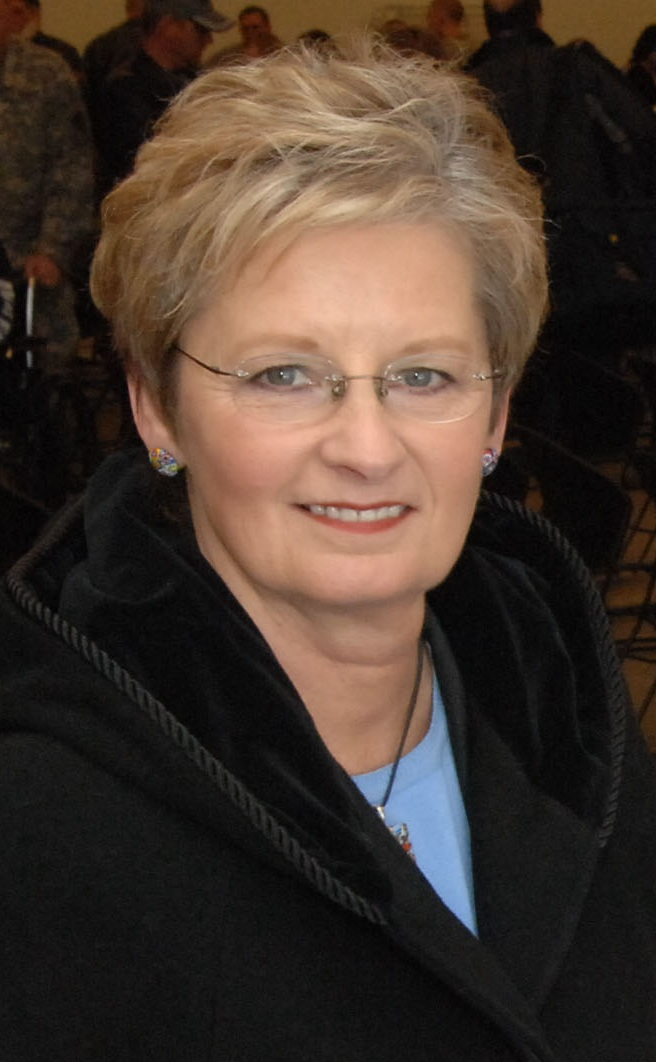

61st Secretary of State of Indiana
- In office March 16, 2012 – March 16, 2021
- Governor: Mitch Daniels; Mike Pence; Eric Holcomb
- Preceded by: Jerry Bonnet (acting)
- Succeeded by: Holli Sullivan

Member of the Indiana Senate from the 24th district
- In office 1996–2012
- Preceded by: Richard Thompson
- Succeeded by: Pete Miller

Personal details
- Born: April 20, 1949 (age 77) Indianapolis, Indiana, U.S.
- Party: Republican
- Spouse: Jack Lawson
- Children: 2

Connie Lawson (born April 20, 1949) is an American politician. A Republican, Lawson was Indiana Secretary of State from 2012 to 2021 and was a member of the Indiana Senate from 1996 to 2012. While in the state senate, she was Republican floor leader.

== Early life, education, and career ==
Lawson was born and raised in Danville, located in Hendricks County in central Indiana. She graduated from Danville High School. She attended Darden School of Legislative Leadership and in 1998 she went to Bowhay Institute for Legislative Leadership. Lawson was elected Clerk of the Hendricks County Circuit Court in 1988. She was reelected twice to four-year terms As clerk, her responsibilities included maintaining all records of the court and overseeing elections. During this period, Lawson was also president of the Indiana Clerks' Association and chair of the group's legislative committee. She also served as Vice Chair of the Hendricks County Republican Party from 1995 to 2005.

== State Senate ==
Lawson was a member of the Indiana Senate from 1996 to 2012. She replaced incumbent State Senator Richard Thompson. She was the first woman appointed to the post of Indiana Senate Majority Floor Leader. The American Conservative Union gave her an Indiana Legislature evaluation of 93%.

Indiana State Senate 24th District Election Results, November 2, 2004

| Candidate | Affiliation | Support | Outcome |
|---|---|---|---|
| Connie Lawson (inc.) | Republican | 44,783 | 100.0% |

Indiana State Senate 24th District Republican Primary Election Results, May 6, 2008

| Candidate | Affiliation | Support | Outcome |
|---|---|---|---|
| Connie Lawson (inc.) | Republican | 10,602 | 79.2% |
| John Gootee | Republican | 2,778 | 20.8% |

Indiana State Senate 24th District Election Results, November 4, 2008

| Candidate | Affiliation | Support | Outcome |
|---|---|---|---|
| Connie Lawson (inc.) | Republican | 53,188 | 100.0% |

== Secretary of State ==
On March 16, 2012, Governor Mitch Daniels appointed Lawson Secretary of State.

Indiana Secretary of State Election Results, November 4, 2014

| Candidate | Affiliation | Support | Outcome |
|---|---|---|---|
| Connie Lawson | Republican | 762,223 | 57.1% |
| Elizabeth White | Democratic | 527,379 | 39.5% |
| Karl Tatgenhorst | Libertarian | 45,393 | 3.4% |

In the summer of 2018, Lawson received two challenges to her eligibility as Candidate for Secretary of State of Indiana. The challenges stemmed from the Indiana Constitution's provision that states no person shall be eligible for "more than eight years in any period of twelve years." Both eligibility claims were dismissed, but questions still exist over her ability to finish the entire term if re-elected in 2018. She was reelected.

In 2016, Lawson targeted a voter registration group, the Indiana Voter Registration Project, who she claimed were "nefarious actors" and who were engaging in turning in "forged voter registration applications." Shortly thereafter, police raided the organization's building. There is no evidence that the group was turning in forged voter registration applications.

On February 15, 2021, Lawson announced that she intended to resign to focus on her health and family. She formally resigned after Indiana Governor Eric Holcomb selected state Rep. Holli Sullivan as Lawson's successor.

== Personal life ==
Connie Lawson is married to Jack Lawson, has two children Brandon and Kylie, and seven grandchildren. She and her husband own and operate Lawson & Company, an auctioneer and real estate business.

Party political offices
| Preceded by Charles P. White | Republican nominee for Secretary of State of Indiana; 2014, 2018 | Succeeded by Diego Morales |
Indiana Senate
| Preceded by Richard Thompson | Member of the Indiana Senate from the 24th district 1996–2012 | Succeeded by Pete Miller |
Political offices
| Preceded by Jerry Bonnet | Secretary of State of Indiana; 2012–2021 | Succeeded by Holli Sullivan |
