= Holli Sullivan =

American politician from Indiana

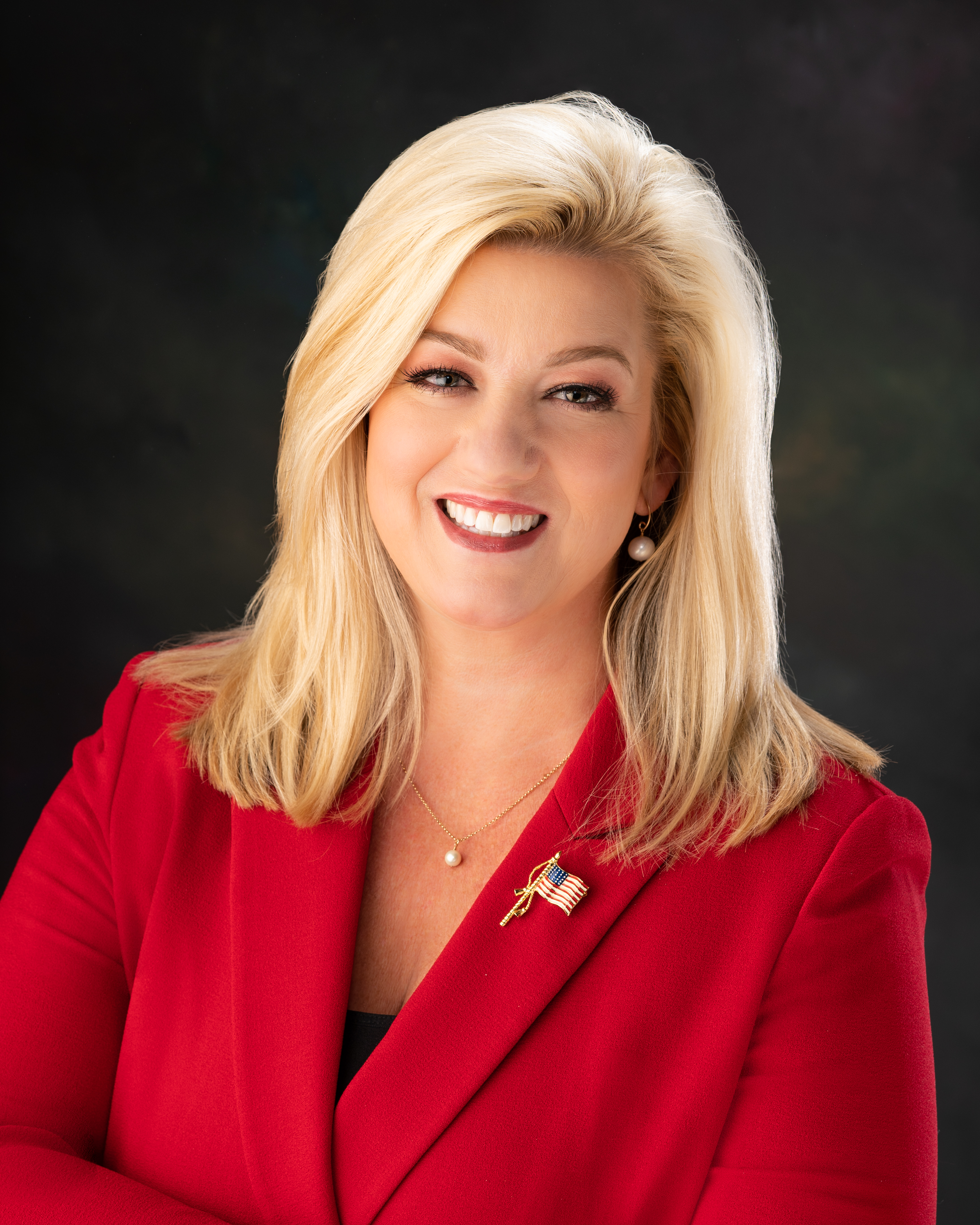

62nd Secretary of State of Indiana
- In office March 16, 2021 – December 31, 2022
- Governor: Eric Holcomb
- Preceded by: Connie Lawson
- Succeeded by: Diego Morales

Member of the Indiana House of Representatives from the 78th district
- In office January 4, 2014 – March 16, 2021
- Preceded by: Suzanne Crouch
- Succeeded by: Tim O'Brien

Personal details
- Party: Republican
- Education: University of Missouri (BS)

Holli Sullivan is an American politician, businesswoman, and engineer who served as the 62nd secretary of state of Indiana from 2021 to 2022. As a member of the Republican Party, she also represented the 78th district in the Indiana House of Representatives from 2014 to 2021.

== Early life and education ==
A native of Vanderburgh County, Indiana, Sullivan graduated from John H. Castle High School. She earned a Bachelor of Science degree in industrial engineering from the University of Missouri and took business management courses at Lindenwood University.

== Early career ==
Sullivan began her career in the paint department of General Motors. From 1999 to 2001, she was the assistant manager of quality for Toyota Motor North America. She was an engineering consultant at the Center for Applied Research of the University of Southern Indiana and later owned Onward Consulting.

== Indiana House of Representatives ==
In 2014, the district 78 seat in the Indiana House of Representatives was vacated by Suzanne Crouch, who had been appointed Indiana state auditor. House District 78 contains parts of Vanderburgh and Warrick counties. Portions of Evansville as well as Newburgh and McCutchanville are within the borders of the district. Sullivan was elected to fill the position in a caucus by precinct committeemen. She was appointed to the House Ways and Means Committee and the Committee on Roads and Transportation. Sullivan was challenged in the 2014 election by Stephen Melcher but defeated him winning 63.8% of the vote. She was challenged in the 2016 election by Philip Bennett but defeated him winning 66.44% of the vote.

In 2017, she co-authored House Bill 1002, which provided for a long-term plan for sustaining roads and bridges in Indiana including a phase-in shift of all gas tax to be dedicated to a dedicated infrastructure fund. That same session, she authored a bill which created a strategic plan to reduce cervical cancer.

== Indiana Secretary of State ==
In 2021, Holli was named the 62nd secretary of state of Indiana by Governor Eric Holcomb.

In June 2022, at the Indiana Republican Party's convention to select their candidates for the general election, Sullivan was defeated by Diego Morales in what was considered an upset.

Political offices
Preceded by Connie Lawson	Secretary of State of Indiana; 2021–2023	Succeeded by Diego Morales
