= Charles P. White =

American politician

Charlie White

60th Secretary of State of Indiana
- In office January 6, 2011 – February 4, 2012
- Governor: Mitch Daniels
- Preceded by: Todd Rokita
- Succeeded by: Jerry Bonnet(interim); Connie Lawson

Chairman of the Hamilton County Republican Party
- In office March 2005 – December 31, 2010
- Preceded by: Leeann Cook
- Succeeded by: Pete Emigh

Member of the Fishers Town Council
- In office May 2001 – September 2010
- Preceded by: Walt Kelly
- Succeeded by: Mike Colby

Personal details
- Born: Charles Patrick White; 1969 (age 56–57)
- Party: Republican
- Children: 2 sons, 1 daughter
- Education: Wabash College (BA); Valparaiso University (JD)
- Profession: Lawyer, Politician
- Website: Official website

Charles Patrick White (born 1969) is the former Republican Indiana Secretary of State, having been first elected to the statewide executive position in November 2010. Prior to that, he served as Chairman of the Hamilton County Republican Party and as a member of the town council of Fishers, a northern suburb of Indianapolis.

He served as the 60th Secretary of State of Indiana from 2011 to 2012.

He was removed from office on February 4, 2012, after a jury convicted him on six felony counts including perjury, theft and voter fraud. On February 23, he was sentenced to one year's house arrest.

== Education ==
White received a B.A. from Wabash College and a J.D. from Valparaiso University. At Wabash, White won the Baldwin Oratorical Award in 1991. He was elected to the Fishers Town Council in 2001, and also served as chairman of the Hamilton County Republican Party

== Career ==
White ran for Secretary of State against Democrat Vop Osili in an election to succeed Republican incumbent Todd Rokita, who was term limited. An issue in the campaign was whether White had continued to serve on the Fishers council even after moving out of Fishers, but still voted in his old precinct in the May Republican primary.

In February 2009, White moved to a condo in another part of Hamilton County. However, he claimed his former home, in which his ex-wife still lives, as his official residence. White subsequently admitted to voting in the wrong precinct but blamed a hectic schedule for his failure to change his address. Nonetheless, White won in a landslide.

The Indiana Democratic Party filed suit, claiming White had not been eligible to run. They claimed that a state law requiring Secretary of State candidates to be registered voters means they must be registered legally. The state Recount Commission dismissed the Democrats' claim on a party-line vote, and White was sworn in on January 6, 2011.

== Indictment ==
In March 2011, White was indicted on seven felony counts including voter fraud, perjury and theft. He was charged with intentionally voting in the wrong precinct in the primary, continuing to serve on the Fishers council and drawing his salary after allegedly moving out of town, even though he was voting at large. He was released from a Hamilton County jail after posting a $10,000 bond.

Shortly after the news broke, Republican Governor Mitch Daniels and Indiana's other state officials urged White to step aside while the charges were pending. Conviction on even one charge would have automatically ousted White as Secretary of State; Indiana, like most states, does not allow convicted felons to hold office.

On April 7, 2011, Marion County Circuit Court Judge Louis Rosenberg ordered the Recount Commission to reconsider the Democrats' legal challenge to White's place on the ballot. Rosenberg could have issued a ruling on his own authority but chose not to do so. If the challenge succeeded, Osili would become Secretary of State by default. By comparison, if White were to be forced out of office as a result of his felony case, Daniels would be able to appoint his successor. The ruling specifically required the Recount Commission to make a finding on the legality of White's registration. Judge Rosenberg retained control of the case and could have issued a ruling himself if he wasn't satisfied with the Recount Commission's work.

Subsequently, White recused himself from the case since the Secretary of State is chairman of the Recount Commission.

White was cleared by the Recount Commission in a bi-partisan 3–0 vote, saying that he intended to use his wife's home as his permanent address. However, the state Democratic party asked Rosenberg to review the decision, arguing that it put too much weight on White's testimony and ignored documents listing his new address. Rosenberg heard the case on November 23, even though White was absent.

Earlier, WISH-TV political reporter Jim Shella wrote in his blog that the Democrats' challenge to White's ballot status could have implications beyond the Secretary of State race. According to Shella, if the Democrats were to prevail, the Republicans would have legally received no votes in the Secretary of State's race. This would drop them below the 10 percent threshold required to retain major-party status in the state (major party status is determined by Secretary of State results). When Judge Rosenberg remanded the eligibility challenge back to the Recount Commission, Shella wrote that from White's perspective, he would be better off settling the criminal case before the fate of his office was decided. He could have reduced the felony counts to misdemeanors in a plea deal, which would have allowed him to keep his law license even if he had to leave office. However, Shella wrote, if he was forced out of office, he would have no bargaining chip in any plea negotiations.

On December 22, 2011, Rosenberg ruled that White had in fact violated election law, and that he had been ineligible to run for office. Rosenberg ordered the Recount Commission to remove White from office and certify Osili, who has since been elected to the Indianapolis City-County Council, as his replacement. White immediately announced he would appeal, and asked Rosenberg to stay his ruling until a higher court can hear the case. The next day, Rosenberg issued a temporary stay on his own ruling until January 3, 2012.

On January 4, Rosenburg ruled that White could stay in office while his appeal works its way through the courts.

=== Conviction of voter fraud ===
On February 4, 2012, a jury found White guilty of six of seven felony charges, including false registration, voting in another precinct, submitting a false ballot, theft, and two counts of perjury. He was acquitted on one fraud charge.

The felony convictions automatically removed White from office, though he presumably could have regained the post if his convictions had been downgraded to misdemeanors and Rosenberg's ruling awarding the office to Osili had been overturned on appeal. Governor Daniels immediately appointed White's deputy, Jerry Bonnet, as interim Secretary of State.

On February 23, Hamilton County Superior Court Judge Steven Nation sentenced White to one year of house arrest, 30 hours of community service and a $1,000 fine. Nation refused to downgrade White's charges to misdemeanors, saying that his actions in the 2010 election were deliberate and therefore "violated the trust of the people." The conviction ends any chance of White regaining office even if his appeal of Rosenberg's ruling is successful.

White lost all of his appeals in state courts and began serving his one-year home-detention sentence in October 2015. In July 2016, his law license was suspended for two years.

Party political offices
Preceded by Todd Rokita	Republican nominee for Secretary of State of Indiana; 2010	Succeeded by Connie Lawson
Political offices
Preceded by Todd Rokita	Secretary of State of Indiana; 2011–2012	Succeeded by Jerry Bonnet
