= Todd Rokita =

American lawyer and politician (born 1970)

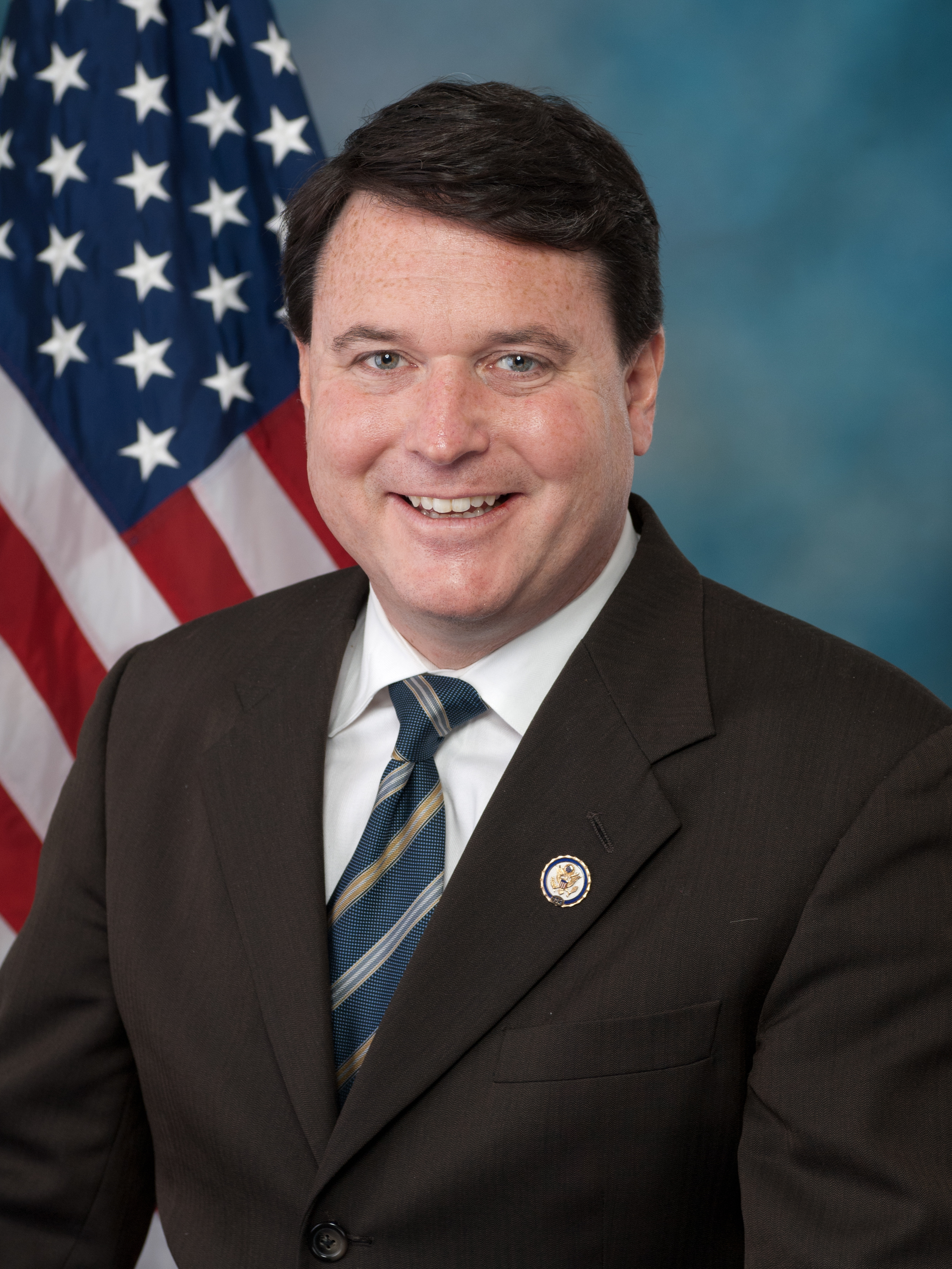
- Official portrait, 2011

44th Attorney General of Indiana
- Incumbent
- Assumed office January 11, 2021
- Governor: Eric Holcomb; Mike Braun
- Preceded by: Curtis Hill

Member of the U.S. House of Representatives from Indiana's 4th district
- In office January 3, 2011 – January 3, 2019
- Preceded by: Steve Buyer
- Succeeded by: Jim Baird

59th Secretary of State of Indiana
- In office December 1, 2002 – December 1, 2010
- Governor: Frank O'Bannon; Joe E. Kernan; Mitch Daniels
- Preceded by: Sue Anne Gilroy
- Succeeded by: Charlie White

Personal details
- Born: Theodore Edward Rokita; February 9, 1970 (age 56) Chicago, Illinois, U.S.
- Party: Republican
- Spouse: Kathy Rokita
- Children: 2
- Education: Wabash College (BA); Indiana University, Indianapolis (JD)
- Rokita's voice Rokita on the H.R. 490, the Heartbeat Protection Act. Recorded November 2, 2017

Theodore Edward "Todd" Rokita (/roʊˈkiːtə/ roh-KEE-tə; born February 9, 1970) is an American lawyer and politician serving as the 44th and current Attorney General of Indiana. He served as a member of the United States House of Representatives from Indiana's 4th congressional district from 2011 to 2019. A member of the Republican Party, he served two terms as Secretary of State of Indiana from 2002 to 2010. When Rokita was elected to office in 2002 at age 32, he became the youngest secretary of state in the United States at the time.

Rokita was a candidate to replace Mike Pence in the 2016 Indiana gubernatorial election after Pence withdrew from the race to be Donald Trump's running mate in the 2016 U.S. presidential election. He lost to Eric Holcomb, Pence's lieutenant governor. Rokita vacated his U.S. House seat and unsuccessfully sought the Republican nomination for U.S. Senate in 2018 losing the Republican primary to Mike Braun. In 2020, Rokita defeated incumbent Curtis Hill for the Republican nomination for Indiana Attorney General, and won the general election. He was considered a possible candidate for United States Senate or Governor, but ultimately ran for reelection, winning a second term as attorney general in 2024.

== Early life and legal trouble ==
Rokita grew up in Munster, Indiana and attended Munster High School. He holds a Bachelor of Arts degree from Wabash College in Crawfordsville, Indiana.

In 1990, Rokita, then 20, was arrested in Bloomington, Indiana, and charged with possession of false ID and illegal consumption. The arrest occurred during a traffic stop for speeding in which Rokita allegedly provided false identification and appeared intoxicated. In 2018, while running for US Senate, Rokita acknowledged he was underage and possessed alcohol, passed a sobriety test, and that the arresting charges of underage consumption and possession of a false ID were dismissed. The IndyStar reported that it was unclear if the charges were dropped because of his participation in a diversion program or other reasons.

Rokita has a J.D. degree from IUPUI Indiana University Robert H. McKinney School of Law. Rokita was a practicing attorney. In 1997 he joined the secretary of state's office as general counsel. He later became deputy secretary of state. In 2000, Rokita served as legal counsel for seven Florida counties during the recount for the George W. Bush presidential campaign.

== Indiana Secretary of State ==
Rokita was Indiana Secretary of State from 2002 to 2010. Elected in 2002, Todd Rokita became the youngest Secretary of state in the United States at the time. Rokita was active in the National Association of Secretaries of State (NASS), and after serving as the elected treasurer, he became the President for the 2007–2008 term. He was elected by his peers nationally to serve on the nine-member federal executive board of the Election Assistance Commission.

=== Voting rights ===
Rokita was a named defendant when Indiana's voter identification case went before the U.S. Supreme Court on January 9, 2008; the combined cases of Crawford v. Marion County Election Board (07-21) and Indiana Democratic Party v. Rokita (07-25). In April 2008, the Supreme Court upheld Indiana's voter photo ID law. Following the ruling, the New York Times's Adam Cohen suggested the court's conservative majority has "become increasingly hostile to voters" by siding with Indiana's voter identification laws which tend to "disenfranchise large numbers of people without driver's licenses, especially poor and minority voters". Senator Al Franken criticized the ruling for "eroding individual rights."

=== Redistricting ===
In September 2009, Rokita outlined a plan called "Rethinking Redistricting" to reform how Indiana's legislative districts are drawn to reduce gerrymandering. He proposed making it a felony for lawmakers to use political data or incumbents' addresses when drawing electoral maps. Rokita said boundaries should follow existing county and township lines, and that each of the 50 Senate districts should be divided into two House districts, claiming that would lead to more competitive legislative elections.

The reform plan sought to achieve these five objectives:

- Keep communities of interest together
- Create more compact and geographically uniform districts
- Reduce voters' confusion about who represents them by following already existing political boundaries, such as county and township lines
- Not use any political data, including incumbent addresses, for partisan reasons
- "Nest" two House districts under the existing lines of a Senate district

=== Controversial comments ===
In April 2007, Rokita was speaking at a Republican event, and encouraged Republicans to reach out to African Americans, mentioning 90 percent of African American voters vote Democratic, after which he asked, "How can that be? Ninety to ten. Who's the master and who's the slave in that relationship? How can that be healthy?". During the course of the same private meeting Rokita was told his office should reflect the diversity of the state, at the time of his remarks 89% of the employees in Rokita's office were white. Four days after making those remarks, he apologized. Rokita also met privately with eleven members of the Indiana Black Legislative Caucus to apologize for the comment. Representative Vernon Smith, D-Gary, told reporters, "He apologized to our satisfaction. We do believe he was sincere in his apology."

== U.S. House of Representatives ==
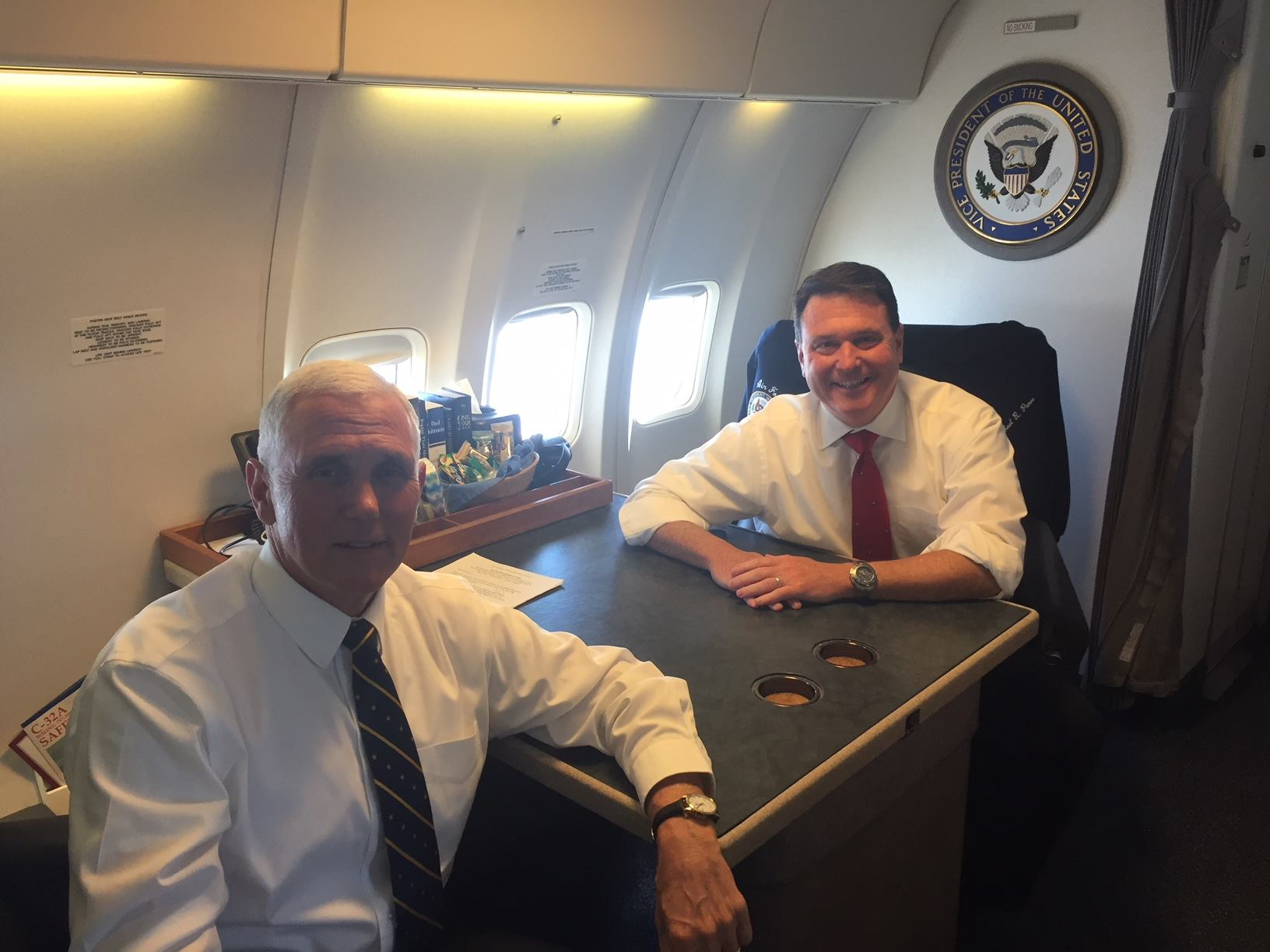
Congressman Rokita sits with Vice President Mike Pence on Air Force Two.

Rokita was a member of the U.S. House of Representatives from 2011 to 2019, where he served as vice-chair of the Budget Committee. Rokita vacated his House seat to run for the Indiana U.S. Senate seat held by Democrat Joe Donnelly, losing the Republican nomination to eventual senator Mike Braun.

In October 2013 during the American government shutdown, Rokita was interviewed by CNN journalist Carol Costello. Her pointed questions about Rokita's defense of the shutdown that furloughed hundreds of thousands of government employees without compensation while he continued to receive his paycheck, were eventually countered with his statement that she was "beautiful but you have to be honest" and that journalists were part of the problem. The Congressman's office issued a statement that he intended no offense by his comments.

== Attorney General of Indiana ==
In 2020, Rokita challenged incumbent Attorney General of Indiana Curtis Hill for the Republican nomination. Rokita defeated Hill for re-nomination in mail-in voting at the Republican state convention, gaining 52% of the vote on the third round. Rokita's nomination marked a political comeback after his unsuccessful runs for governor in 2016 and U.S. Senate in 2018. In the general election, Rokita faced Democratic nominee Jonathan Weinzapfel, a former mayor of Evansville. Rokita defeated Weinzapfel in the November election, the sixth consecutive election in which Republicans retained control of the AG's office.

Rokita was sworn in as Attorney General in January 2021. In 2021, Rokita faced scrutiny for collecting tens of thousands of dollars in payments for advisory roles from various healthcare and pharmaceutical companies while holding public office. In July 2022, Lauren Robel, former Indiana University provost and law school dean, sent a three-page letter to the Indiana Supreme Court Disciplinary Commission calling for a disciplinary investigation into Rokita, alleging he made "false or baseless" statements on Fox News concerning an Indiana doctor who performed an abortion for a 10-year-old Ohio rape victim.

=== Election reform ===
Rokita led a letter signed by 20 Republican state attorneys general opposing the For the People Act, election reform legislation introduced by Democrats in the United States House of Representatives. In March 2021, Rokita testified in the U.S. Senate Rules Committee in opposition to the legislation, threatening to sue if the bill became law. Rokita asserted voting laws should be based on voters' perceptions, rather than any actual evidence of fraud. Democratic Senator Jon Ossoff, responding to Rokita's statement, said he took exception to the notion "that public concern regarding the integrity of the recent election is born of anything but a deliberate and sustained misinformation campaign led by a vain former president unwilling to accept his own defeat" and that said he found it disturbing that a state attorney general "would indulge in that kind of misinformation and spread those kinds of conspiracies".

=== Lawsuits against the Biden administration ===
Rokita joined other Republican state AGs in suing the Biden administration over an executive order on environmental protection and climate change.

=== Abortion case ===
After a 10-year-old rape victim received a lawful abortion in Indiana, Rokita told Fox News in July 2022 that Caitlin Bernard, the gynecologist who performed the abortion, was an "abortion activist acting as a doctor with a history of failing to report" abortions, indicating that Rokita would investigate whether the gynecologist had fulfilled the reporting requirement in this case, and threatening a suspension of her medical license or criminal prosecution if that was not done. Indiana government records released through a public records request by Fox 59 showed that the gynecologist had filed the report within the required three-day timeframe. Rokita's office responded that they would continue investigating the gynecologist.

A lawyer for the gynecologist sent a cease-and-desist letter to Rokita stating "Your false and defamatory statements to Fox News on July 13, 2022, cast [the gynecologist] in a false light and allege misconduct in her profession" and "mislead consumers and patients". In November 2022, the gynecologist sued Rokita in Indiana Commercial Court, alleging that he improperly launched investigations into her based on meritless consumer complaints that were filed by individuals who had not actually interacted with the gynecologist, but made the complaints based on reading about the case of the 10-year old receiving an abortion.

On November 30, 2022, Rokita sent a complaint about the gynecologist to the Indiana Medical Licensing Board, asking for sanctions on the gynecologist. The complaint alleged that the gynecologist broke privacy laws and the Health Insurance Portability and Accountability Act when discussing the case with the media, even though the gynecologist did not reveal the girl's identity. The complaint also alleged that the gynecologist did not immediately report the abuse to Indiana authorities. The gynecologist testified in court that she had informed her hospital's social work department about the abuse even before the 10-year-old travelled to Indianapolis, and also testified that the hospital's social work department handles the submission of abuse reports to authorities.

In December 2022, Marion County Superior Court Judge Heather Welch found that Rokita "clearly violated Indiana law", specifically "the licensing statute's confidentiality provision by discussing the statutorily confidential investigation [against the gynecologist] in statements to the media" in July 2022 and September 2022 before making a complaint to the Medical Licensing Board in November 2022. The judge elaborated that Rokita's "comments do constitute irreparable harm" in relation to the gynecologist's "concerns about reputational and professional harm". However, the judge rejected the gynecologist's request to stop Rokita from obtaining the medical records of the gynecologist's patients, leading to the gynecologist withdrawing her lawsuit.

In September 2023, Rokita sued Bernard's employer, hospital system IU Health, claiming that it had failed to protect the 10-year old's privacy.

The Disciplinary Commission of the Indiana Supreme Court in September 2023 filed professional misconduct charges against Rokita. Two charges pertained to his July 2022 comment to the media that Bernard was an "abortion activist acting as a doctor, with a history of failing to report"; the commission alleged that Rokita's comment had "no substantial purpose other than to embarrass, delay, or burden", and that Rokita's comment was an "extrajudicial statement" that Rokita "should reasonably know" would spread publicly and would have a "substantial likelihood of materially prejudicing an adjudicative proceeding in the matter." The third charge alleged that Rokita violated his "duty of confidentiality" due to public statements made before referring Bernard to the medical board. Rokita responded that the situation was one "that 'cancels' non-compliant citizens through intimidation as well as tactics that can weaponize our respected institutions", and also argued that the duty of confidentiality may only apply to his employees and not him, the attorney general. The Indiana Supreme Court in November 2023 concluded that Rokita had committed "attorney misconduct" with his "abortion activist … with a history of failing to report" public comment, with Rokita admitting to the first two charges above, hence the court publicly reprimanded Rokita and fined him $250. Rokita responded by claiming that he "was not fined", describing his past statement as "factual", and repeated his description of Bernard being an "abortion activist".

=== COVID-19 pandemic ===
In May 2021 during the COVID-19 pandemic, Rokita issued an opinion stating that Indiana University's implementation of a mandate to show proof of immunization violated state law. He also cited that Purdue University found a procedural loophole by not requiring vaccination status, but to participate in testing. In November 2021, Rokita filed a lawsuit against the Biden administration opposing a federal mandate. In April 2022, Rokita issued a statement saying that Indiana schools could not be sued for COVID-related damages. In November 2022, Rokita asked the Indiana Supreme Court to decide if students can file class-action lawsuits against Indiana's public universities to recover tuition and fees paid for services not rendered due to cancellation of in-person classes during the pandemic.

=== Social media ===
In December 2022, Rokita filed a lawsuit against TikTok, claiming that the platform exposes minors to age-inappropriate content and puts users' data at risk.

=== Eyes on Education ===
On February 5, 2024, Rokita launched a website called Eyes on Education, which aims to stop "objectionable curricula, policies, or programs affecting children". It features a submission form where people can report school material that they believe violates Indiana law. School officials responded that they were not informed of the website's existence and that the complaints are not vetted before appearing on the site.

=== Roblox and Discord ===
On May 7, 2026, Rokita filed a 70-page lawsuit against Roblox and Discord. The Attorney General alleges the platforms have not made sufficient measures to protect children against predators online, and the effectiveness of the safety features that were released "remain to be seen." The lawsuit says Roblox claims it has robust features to protect children that fall short, with sexually explicit content accessible on the platform. The lawsuit said predators form online friendships with children and then attempt to exploit them with the "Robux" currency empowering predators. The companies are accused of violating the Indiana Deceptive Consumer Sales Act by failing to employ adequate safeguards for children and warnings for parents and guardians about objectionable content and misrepresenting the safety of their platforms.

== Political positions ==
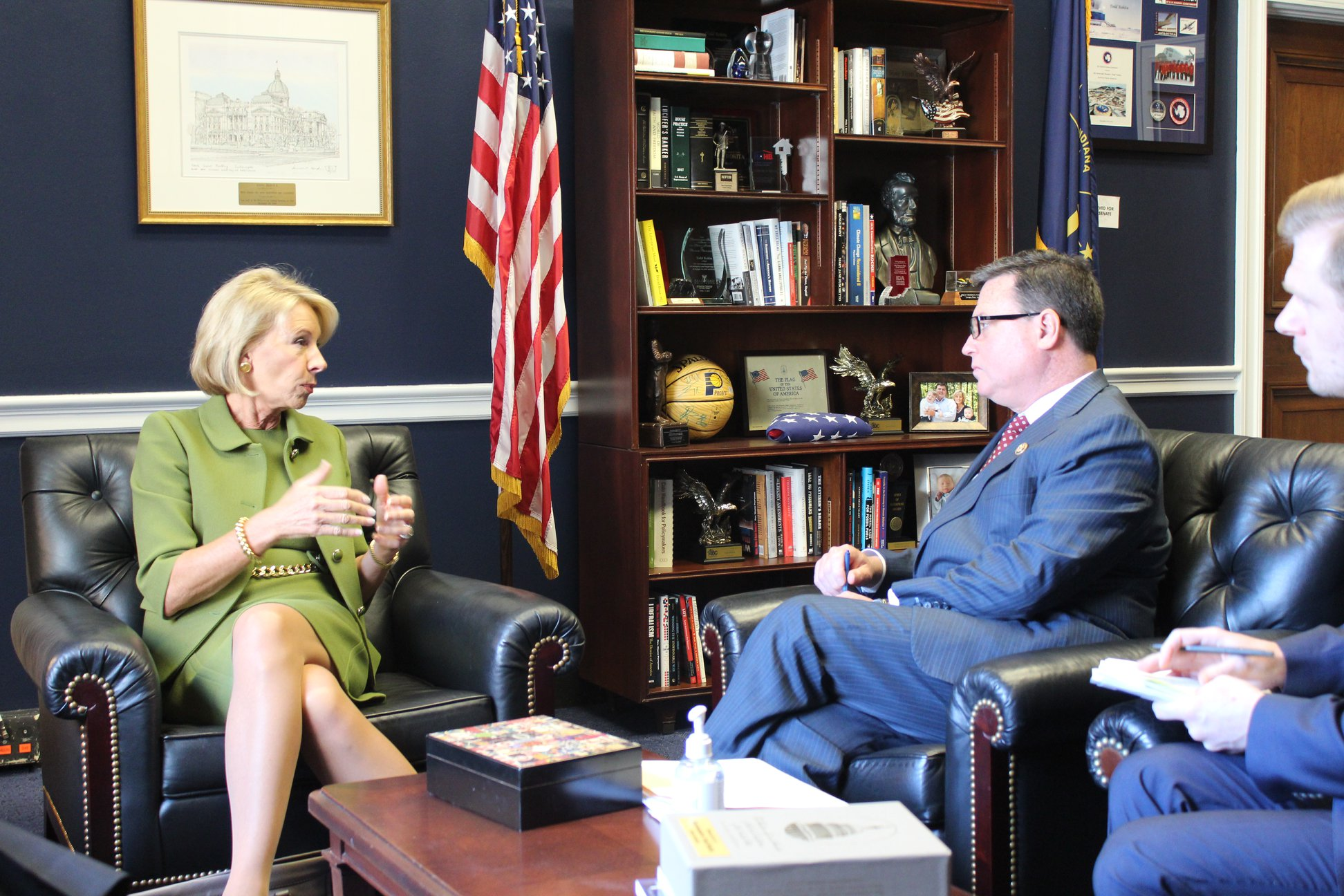
Rokita discusses education policy with U.S. Secretary of Education Betsy DeVos.

=== Abortion ===
Rokita opposes abortion and has maintained a 100% anti-abortion voting record according to the National Right to Life Committee. He stated he believes that life begins from the moment of conception "without exception".

=== Affordable Care Act ===
In 2013, Rokita stated the Affordable Care Act was "one of the most insidious laws ever created by man".

=== Agriculture ===
Rokita opposes direct federal government regulation of agriculture. As a former representative of a heavy-farming district in Indiana, he supported deregulating agriculture.

=== Cannabis ===
Rokita opposes recreational use of cannabis, citing concern that it is a "gateway drug" to more dangerous narcotics. He expressed willingness to support legalization of some medical uses for cannabis only if the THC is removed.

Rokita is a supporter of industrial hemp, having voted to allow its production. In December 2018, he told a group of local Republicans that legalizing industrial hemp "could help the farming community".

=== Crime ===
Rokita is a supporter of capital punishment. In June 2024, he sought a death warrant for the execution of Joseph Corcoran. The execution was carried out in December of that year and marked Indiana's first execution since 2009.

=== Economy ===
In 2017, Rokita voted in favor of the Tax Cuts and Jobs Act of 2017.

=== Education ===
Rokita supports charter schools, school choice, and reducing the role of the Department of Education in setting education policy. In 2015, Rokita and Senator Marco Rubio introduced the Education Opportunities Act, a bill to expand choice options through the use of tax credits.

As Chairman of the Subcommittee on Early Childhood, Elementary, and Secondary Education, he had an active role in crafting the Every Student Succeeds Act, which reauthorized the 1965 Elementary and Secondary Education Act. In May, Rokita introduced bipartisan legislation with Alcee Hastings (D-FL) to help students and parents with student loan debt. His legislation would allow student loan borrowers to refinance loans and have access to lower market rate loans.

=== Environment ===
Rokita does not accept the scientific consensus that human activity is the driving factor of climate change, and at a 2013 town-hall event called the idea that climate change was caused by human activity "arrogant". Rokita has a 4% lifetime voting rating from the League of Conservation Voters, an environmentalist group.

=== Guns ===
Rokita has stated: "I'm proud of my "A" rating from the NRA" and has said that he will "protect our 2nd Amendment right to keep and bear arms."

=== Health care ===
Rokita opposes the Affordable Care Act and voted dozens of times to repeal it during his time in Congress. While running for Indiana Attorney General in 2020, Rokita pledged to support a lawsuit to have the Affordable Care Act deemed unconstitutional.

In December 2021, Rokita appeared on station WSBT and appeared to suggest he did not trust statistics indicating that COVID-19 had killed Hoosiers, stating, "I don't believe any numbers anymore." Days later, in a series of tweets explaining the WSBT interview response, Rokita, without evidence, cited healthcare workers with financial motivations as the source of the allegedly misleading statistics and for recording deaths from other causes as COVID-19 fatalities. In the same series of tweets, Rokita thanked healthcare workers, stating they were heroes.

=== Immigration ===
In 2017, Rokita introduced the Stopping Lawless Actions of Politicians (SLAP) Act. The legislation would introduce fines and jail time for state and local politicians who implemented sanctuary city policies. The SLAP Act did not receive a vote and thus was not enacted into law.

Rokita supported President Trump's 2017 executive order temporarily banning citizens of seven Muslim-majority countries from entering the U.S.

=== Tribal lands ===
Rokita authored the Tribal Labor Sovereignty Act. The bill would "make clear that the National Labor Relations Board has no jurisdiction over businesses owned and operated by an Indian tribe and located on tribal land." It cleared the House as of 2018, but has not been considered in the Senate.

=== Donald Trump ===
During his time in Congress, Rokita voted in line with President Donald Trump 90.3% of the time. During the Republican primary for the 2018 United States Senate election in Indiana, Rokita earned the support of the chair and vice chair of 2016 Trump campaign in Indiana.

In May 2019, the Trump White House announced Trump would nominate Rokita to join the AMTRAK Board of Directors. The Senate did not act on the nomination, which expired on January 3, 2021, at the end of the 116th Congress.

==== Efforts to overturn the 2020 presidential election ====
In 2020, after former Vice President Joe Biden won the 2020 presidential election and Trump refused to concede while making false claims of fraud, Rokita, as Attorney General-elect, endorsed a petition (Texas v. Pennsylvania) to the United States Supreme Court submitted by the Texas Attorney General Ken Paxton who sought to challenge the 2020 presidential election results. The Supreme Court rejected the petition.

After the 2021 storming of the United States Capitol in January 2021, Rokita declined to sign a National Association of Attorneys General letter condemning the attack. Instead, he issued his own statement with other Republican Attorneys General writing, "we can uphold the critical Constitutional right to freedom of speech as we oppose any attempt to hijack a protest to condemn violence." Two days later, Rokita tweeted that "I will always be for our President." The next day he issued a statement saying that the tweets were an "experiment in free speech"; criticizing social media companies for "controlling the entire dialogue of a nation"; and said that "I also condemn the Capitol violence in the same way and terms that I have condemned the violence last summer." In February 2021, Rokita falsely implied on Twitter that the 2020 presidential election had been "stolen" from Trump. The platform initially restricted the distribution of Rokita's message, citing the risk of violence, but later found that the tweets in question did not violate policy.

== Electoral history ==
=== 2002 ===
On June 15, 2002, Rokita won the Republican nomination for Indiana Secretary of State at the state convention over Mike Delph, then an aide to U.S. Representative Dan Burton, Marion County Coroner John McGoff, and then-Vanderburgh County Commissioner Richard Mourdock. Rokita went on to win the general election with 53.4% of the vote.

=== 2006 ===
Rokita received the Republican nomination again in 2006 and won the general election with 51.1% of the vote in a year when Democrats took five of Indiana's nine congressional seats.

=== 2010 ===
On February 1, 2010, three days after Congressman Steve Buyer of Indiana's 4th congressional district said that he would retire at the end of his term, Rokita posted an announcement on Facebook making clear his intentions to run for the open seat. Buyer's announcement touched off a free-for-all among area Republicans to succeed him. Ultimately, 13 candidates entered the Republican primary, including Rokita.

With a Cook Partisan Voting Index of R+14, the 4th is one of the most Republican districts in the Eastern Time Zone and tied for the second-most Republican in the state (behind the 5th District). It was taken for granted that whoever won the primary would be heavily favored to be the district's next representative. Rokita won the primary with 42% of the vote and the general election with 68.6% of the vote.

=== 2012 ===
Rokita won the general election in 2012 with 62% of the vote.

=== 2014 ===
Rokita won the Republican nomination in 2014 with 71% of the vote. He won the general election with 67% of the vote over John Dale, a teacher at Western Boone High School.

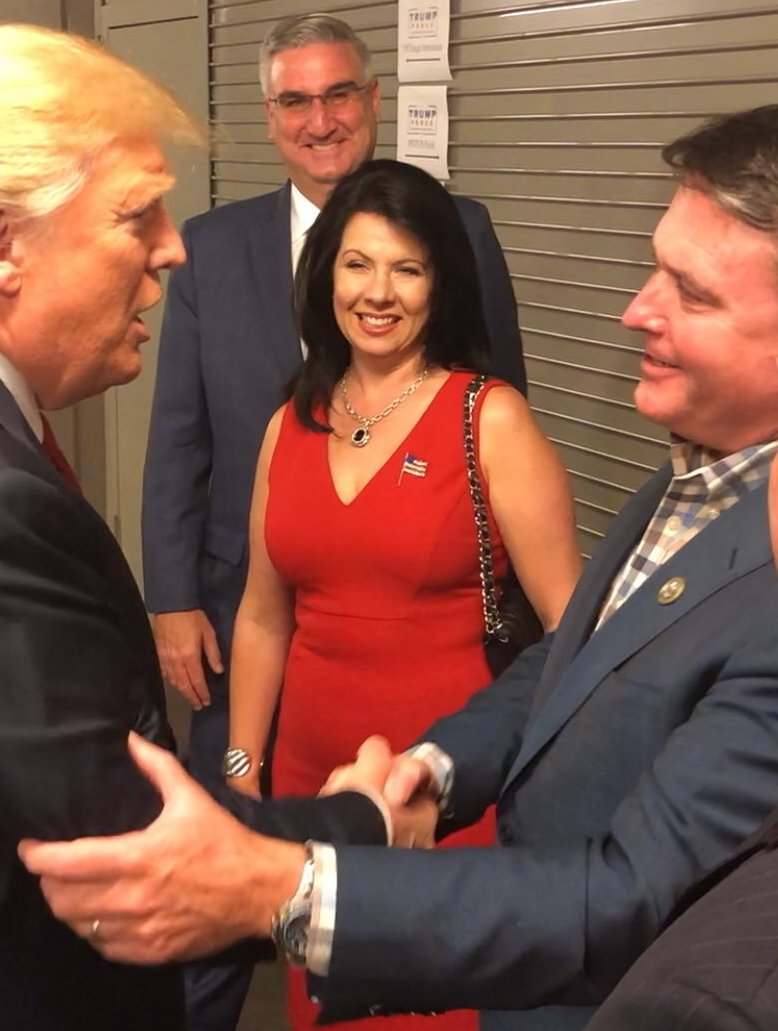
Rokita with President Donald Trump.

=== 2016 ===
Rokita won the Republican nomination in 2016 with 60% of the vote. In the general election, he faced John Dale in a rematch from 2014. Rokita was reelected with 65% of the vote to Dale's 30%. Libertarian Steven M. Mayoras received 5%.

=== 2018 ===
On August 8, 2017, Rokita announced his intention to vacate his house seat, and run for the U.S. Senate in 2018 against Democratic incumbent Joe Donnelly. He lost the Republican primary election to Mike Braun, coming in second with 30% of the vote.

=== 2020 ===
On July 10, 2020, Rokita defeated incumbent Indiana Attorney General Curtis Hill during the Indiana Republican Party Convention. Rokita went on to win the November general election, securing 58.34% of the vote.

=== 2024 ===
On February 21, 2024, Rokita announced that he would seek reelection to a second term as Indiana Attorney General. Rokita went on to win the November general election, securing 58.83% of the vote.

Date	Position	Status	Opponent	Result	Vote share	Top-opponent vote share
2002	Secretary of State of Indiana	Open-seat	John Fernandez (D)	Elected	53.41%	42.46%
2006	Secretary of State of Indiana	Incumbent	Joe Pearson (D)	Re-elected	51.06%	45.60%
2010	U.S. Representative	Open-seat	David Sanders (D)	Elected	68.57%	26.28%
2012	U.S. Representative	Incumbent	Tara Nelson (D)	Re-elected	61.96%	34.16%
2014	U.S. Representative	Incumbent	John Dale (D)	Re-elected	66.87%	33.13%
2016	U.S. Representative	Incumbent	John Dale (D)	Re-elected	64.60%	30.47%
2020	Attorney General of Indiana	Open-seat	Jonathan Weinzapfel (D)	Elected	58.34%	41.66%
2024	Attorney General of Indiana	Incumbent	Destiny Wells (D)	Re-elected	58.83%	41.17%

== Personal life and affiliations ==
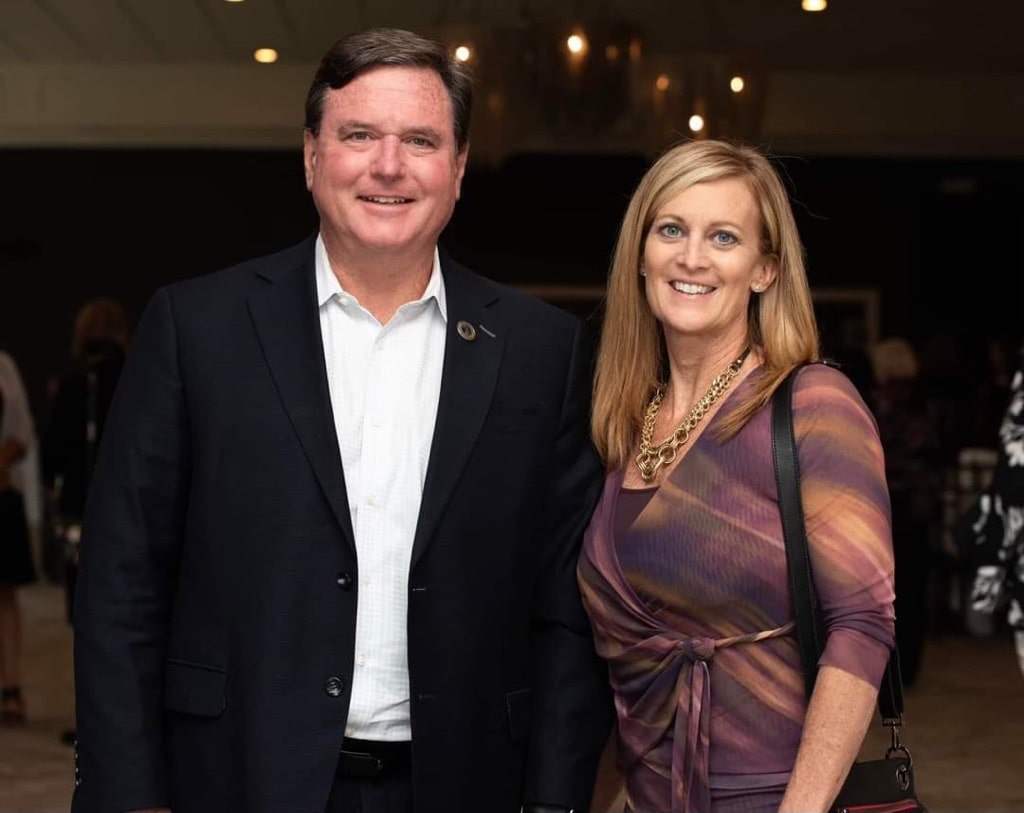
Rokita with his wife Kathy.

Rokita is a member of the Director's Circle of the Indiana Council for Economic Education, the state bar association, the Knights of Columbus, and the National Rifle Association. He has also served as Chair of NASS's New Millennium Young Voters Summit of 2004, chair of the standing Voter Participation Committee and vice chair of the Securities Regulation Committee. He is a member of the Indiana chapter of the International Flying Farmers, and member of the Saint Vincent Hospital Foundation Board of Directors.

Rokita's oldest son, Teddy, suffers from Angelman syndrome. Rokita is a commercial-rated pilot.

Rokita formerly lived in Clermont, an "included town" in Indianapolis under the Unigov system. The 2010 round of redistricting cut out the 4th's share of Indianapolis and Marion County, leaving Rokita's home 500 yards outside the new 4th's eastern border. Members of Congress are required to live only in the state they represent, but it is a strong convention that they live within their district's borders. In 2012 Rokita ran for reelection from his home in Clermont, but he later bought a home near Brownsburg, a western suburb of Indianapolis within the 4th district.

Rokita is Catholic.

Party political offices
Preceded by Sue Anne Gilroy	Republican nominee for Secretary of State of Indiana; 2002, 2006	Succeeded by Charles P. White
Preceded by Curtis Hill	Republican nominee for Attorney General of Indiana; 2020, 2024	Most recent
Political offices
Preceded by Sue Anne Gilroy	Secretary of State of Indiana; 2002–2010	Succeeded by Charlie White
U.S. House of Representatives
Preceded by Steve Buyer	Member of the U.S. House of Representatives from Indiana's 4th congressional district 2011–2019	Succeeded by Jim Baird
Legal offices
Preceded by Curtis Hill	Attorney General of Indiana; 2021–present	Incumbent
U.S. order of precedence (ceremonial)
Preceded by David W. Evans as Former US Representative	Order of precedence of the United States as Former US Representative	Succeeded by Susan Brooks as Former US Representative
