= Secretary of State of Indiana =

Constitutional office in Indiana, United States

- Seal of Indiana

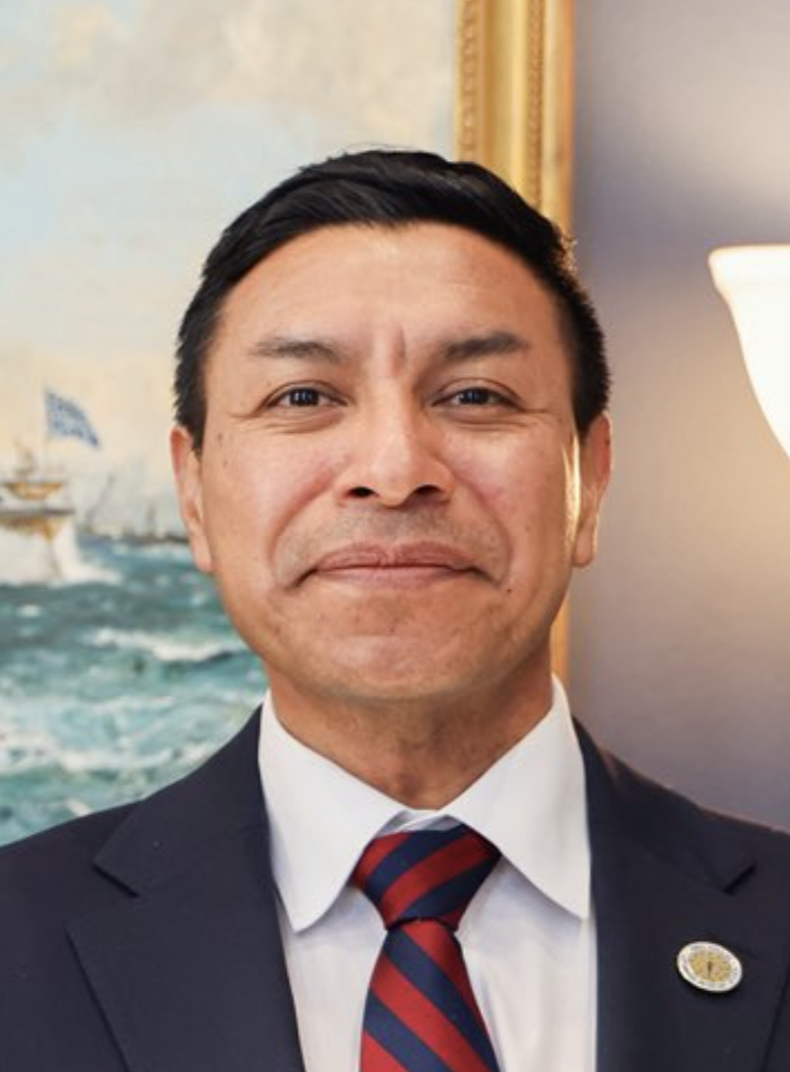
- Incumbent; Diego Morales since January 9, 2023
- Term length: 4 years
- Inaugural holder: Robert A. New; November 7, 1816
- Formation: Indiana Constitution; 1816
- Succession: Sixth
- Salary: $145,876
- Website: www.in.gov/sos

The secretary of state of Indiana is one of five constitutional officers originally designated in Indiana's state constitution of 1816. Since 1851, it has been an elected position. The secretary of state oversees four divisions, and is the third highest constitutional office of the state government. The secretary serves as the state's chief election officer, enforces state securities regulations, regulates automobile dealerships in Indiana, and manages the state business services division. The current office holder is Diego Morales.

== Qualifications and term limits ==
The Indiana secretary of state is a constitutional office first established in the 1816 Constitution of Indiana. Between 1816 and until 1851, the secretary of state was nominated by the governor and confirmed by the state senate. With the adoption of the current constitution in 1851 the secretary of state's office was filled by a public statewide election every four years.

To be eligible to serve as secretary of state, a candidate must be a registered voter who is at least 30 years old on the day they take the oath of office. Secretaries of state take office on December 1 following their election and hold office for four years. Should they resign, be impeached, or die in office the governor has the power to appoint a temporary secretary of state to serve until the next general election. The new secretary of state, either appointed or elected, may only complete the term of the previous secretary of state, not serve a new four-year term. A secretary of state may be reelected any number of times, but may serve no more than eight years in any 12-year period. As of 2014, the salary for the secretary is $74,580 annually.

Elections for secretary of state determine party status in Indiana. A party's secretary of state candidate must garner at least 10 percent of the vote for his or her party to be considered a major party in the state.

== Powers ==
Indiana's secretary of state is a constitutional office in the executive branch of the Government of Indiana. State law designates the Indiana secretary of state as the state's chief election officer. The Indiana Election Division assists the secretary in receiving candidate filings and certifying election results. The Indiana Election Division also receives campaign finance reports and assists the Indiana Election Commission in the administration of campaign finance laws. The secretary of state serves as chair of the State Recount Commission which conducts recounts and contests regarding major party primary nominations and general elections for federal, statewide, and state legislative offices.

The Indiana General Assembly has granted the secretary additional statutory powers to maintain the state's registry of notaries.

The Indiana Securities Division is placed under the leadership of the secretary. The division is statutory and is responsible for enforcing regulations on the purchase, sale, and trade of all security investments in the state. The division is responsible for granting operating licenses to collection agencies who wish to collect debts within the state. The division investigates violations of the state securities laws, can levy fines on law violators, and can request the Indiana attorney general pursue criminal charges. As of 2007, the division regulated over 1,000 trading firms and their nearly 40,000 agents.

The secretary also heads the statutory Division of Business Services. The division is responsible for maintaining the records of all corporations operating within Indiana, which in 2007 amounted to over 250,000 active and inactive corporations. Non-profit businesses, limited liability companies, and limited liability partnerships also are required to register with the division. The division also approves trademarks and service marks for state companies. The division also maintains Indiana's Uniform Commercial Code which documents the assets and finances of businesses that fall under jurisdiction of the code. In 2007, approximately one million records were kept in accordance with the code.

== Duties ==
The secretary of state is one of five constitutional officers originally designated in Indiana's State Constitution of 1816. Sixty-one Hoosiers have served as the third highest-ranking official in state government.

Early duties of the office included the maintenance of state records and preservation of the state seal. But as state government expanded, so did the responsibilities of the secretary of state. Present responsibilities include chartering of new business, regulation of the securities industry, administering regulations relating to the registration of motorized vehicle dealers, and oversight of state elections.

== Organization of office ==
The Executive Office, located in the Indiana Statehouse, oversees the overall policy, management, and budgeting for the entire office. Four main divisions comprise the balance of the office: Elections, Business Services, Securities and Dealer Services.

Elections: The Elections Division assists the secretary of state in carrying out the responsibilities assigned as Indiana's chief elections officer. The bipartisan division is composed of an equal number of Democrats and Republicans. The division's administrative responsibilities include overseeing the candidate declaration process, certifying election results, and maintaining campaign finance reports. The secretary of state also serves as chairperson for the Indiana Recount Commission and participates in voter outreach projects aimed at increasing voter participation. The Indiana Election Commission, as opposed to the division, is an independently appointed commission of two Republicans and two Democrats. The commission deals with questions associated with violations of the Indiana election laws, and with the imposition of penalties.

Business Services: The Business Services Division administers all business-related responsibilities for the secretary of state including the chartering of new businesses, the filing of commercial liens, and the issuance of trademarks, notaries public and summonses.

Securities: The Securities Division oversees Indiana's securities industry. The division is charged with protecting Hoosier investors by bringing enforcement actions against companies and individuals selling securities in violation of Indiana's securities laws and by educating Hoosiers about prudent investing. Over the past four years, the division has imposed a record amount in fines and penalties against scam artists preying upon unsuspecting Hoosier investors.

Dealer Services: Dealer Services administers regulations relating to the registration of motorized vehicle dealers, including dealers for automobiles, watercraft, off-road vehicles and automobile salvage.

== List of secretaries of state ==
Democratic-Republican Democratic Whig Republican

=== Territorial secretaries ===
#	Name	Took office	Left office	Party	Hometown	Notes
1	John Gibson	July 4, 1800	November 7, 1816	Democratic-Republican	Knox County, Indiana	(Note: Served as acting governor of Indiana Territory from December 28, 1812 to March 3, 1813)

=== Secretaries of state ===
#	Image	Name	Took office	Left office	Party	Hometown	Notes
1		Robert A. New	November 7, 1816	December 6, 1825	Democratic-Republican	Clark County, Indiana	r
2		William W. Wick	January 14, 1825	January 14, 1829	Democratic-Republican	Connersville, Indiana	
3		James Morrison	January 14, 1829	January 14, 1833	Democratic-Republican	Charlestown, Indiana	
4		William Sheets	January 14, 1833	January 14, 1837	Whig	Madison, Indiana	
5		William J. Brown	January 14, 1837	January 14, 1841	Democratic	Rushville, Indiana	
6		William Sheets	January 14, 1841	January 14, 1845	Whig	Madison, Indiana	
7		John H. Thompson	January 14, 1845	January 14, 1849	Whig	Clark County, Indiana	
8		Charles H. Test	January 14, 1849	January 14, 1851	Democratic	Wayne County, Indiana	
9		Nehemiah Hayden	January 14, 1853	January 14, 1855	Democratic	Rush County, Indiana	
10		Erasmus B. Collins	January 14, 1855	January 14, 1857	Republican	Dearborn County, Indiana	
11		Daniel McClure	January 16, 1857	October 28, 1858	Democratic	Marion County, Indiana	(Note: Resigned from office)
12		Cyrus L. Dunham	October 28, 1858	January 15, 1861	Democratic	New Albany, Indiana	
13		William A. Peele	January 15, 1861	January 15, 1863	Republican	Winchester, Indiana	
14		James S. Athon	January 16, 1863	January 16, 1865	Democratic	Marion County, Indiana	
15		Nelson Trusler	January 16, 1865	January 16, 1869	Republican	Connersville, Indiana	
16		Max F. A. Hoffman	January 16, 1869	January 16, 1871	Republican	Valparaiso, Indiana	
17		Norman Eddy	January 16, 1871	February 1, 1872	Democratic	South Bend, Indiana	(Note: Died in office)
18		John H. Farquhar	February 1, 1872	January 16, 1873	Republican	Richmond, Indiana	
19		William W. Curry	January 16, 1873	January 16, 1875	Republican	Terre Haute, Indiana	
20		John E. Neff	January 16, 1875	January 16, 1879	Democratic	Winchester, Indiana	
21		John G. Shanklin	January 16, 1879	January 16, 1881	Democratic	Evansville, Indiana	
22		Emanuel R. Hawn	January 16, 1881	January 16, 1883	Republican	Leavenworth, Indiana	
23		William R. Myers	January 16, 1883	January 16, 1887	Democratic	Anderson, Indiana	
24		Charles F. Griffin	January 16, 1887	January 16, 1891	Republican	Hammond, Indiana	
25		Claude Matthews	January 16, 1891	January 9, 1893	Democratic	Vermillion County, Indiana	(Note: Served as Governor of Indiana)
26		Myron D. King	January 9, 1893	January 17, 1893	Democratic	Covington, Indiana	
27		William R. Myers	January 17, 1893	January 17, 1895	Democratic	Anderson, Indiana	
28		William D. Owen	January 17, 1895	January 17, 1899	Republican	Bedford, Indiana	
29		Union B. Hunt	January 17, 1899	January 17, 1903	Republican	Randolph County, Indiana	
30		Daniel E. Storms	January 17, 1903	April 1, 1906	Republican	Stockwell, Indiana	
31		Fred A. Sims	April 1, 1906	November 27, 1910	Republican	Indianapolis, Indiana	
32		L. G. Ellingham	November 27, 1910	November 27, 1914	Democratic	Decatur, Indiana	
33		Homer L. Cook	November 27, 1914	November 27, 1916	Democratic	Indianapolis, Indiana	
34		Edward L. Jackson	November 27, 1916	November 21, 1917	Republican	Indianapolis, Indiana	
35		William A. Roach	November 22, 1917	January 17, 1920	Republican	Delphi, Indiana	
36		Edward L. Jackson	January 22, 1920	November 27, 1924	Republican	Indianapolis, Indiana	
37		Fred Schortemeier	December 1, 1924	December 1, 1928	Republican	Indianapolis, Indiana	
38		Otto G. Fifield	December 1, 1928	December 1, 1930	Republican	Crown Point, Indiana	
39		Frank Mayr Jr.	December 1, 1930	December 1, 1934	Democratic	South Bend, Indiana	
40		August G. Mueller	December 1, 1934	December 1, 1938	Democratic	Indianapolis, Indiana	
41		James M. Tucker	December 1, 1938	July 25, 1942	Republican	Paoli, Indiana	
42		Maurice G. Thompson	July 25, 1942	December 1, 1942	Republican	Anderson, Indiana	
43		Rue J. Alexander	December 1, 1942	December 1, 1946	Republican	Pine Village, Indiana	
44		Thomas E. Bath Jr.	December 2, 1946	December 1, 1948	Republican	South Bend, Indiana	
45		Charles F. Fleming	December 1, 1948	December 1, 1950	Democratic	Hammond, Indiana	
46		Leland L. Smith	December 1, 1950	December 1, 1952	Republican	Logansport, Indiana	
47		Crawford F. Parker	December 1, 1952	December 1, 1956	Republican	New Castle, Indiana	
48		Frank A. Lennings	December 1, 1956	December 1, 1958	Republican	Bloomfield, Indiana	
49		John R. Walsh	December 1, 1958	December 1, 1960	Democratic	Martinsville, Indiana	
50		Charles O. Hendricks	December 1, 1960	December 1, 1964	Republican	Speed, Indiana	
51		John D. Bottorff	December 1, 1964	December 1, 1966	Democratic	Indianapolis, Indiana	
52		Edgar Whitcomb	December 1, 1966	December 1, 1968	Republican	Seymour, Indiana	
53		William N. Salin	December 1, 1968	December 1, 1970	Republican	Fort Wayne, Indiana	
54		Larry Conrad	December 1, 1970	December 1, 1978	Democratic	Muncie, Indiana	
55		Edwin Simcox	December 1, 1978	December 1, 1986	Republican	Indianapolis, Indiana	
56		Evan Bayh	December 1, 1986	January 9, 1989	Democratic	Evansville, Indiana	
57		Joe Hogsett	January 9, 1989	December 1, 1994	Democratic	Indianapolis, Indiana	
58		Sue Anne Gilroy	December 1, 1994	December 1, 2002	Republican	Indianapolis, Indiana	
59		Todd Rokita	December 1, 2002	December 1, 2010	Republican	Munster, Indiana	
60		Charlie White	January 6, 2011	February 4, 2012	Republican	Fishers, Indiana	
–		Jerry Bonnet	February 4, 2012	March 16, 2012	Republican	Yorktown, Indiana	(Note: Served on an interim basis after the expulsion of White from office)
61		Connie Lawson	March 16, 2012	March 16, 2021	Republican	Danville, Indiana	
62		Holli Sullivan	March 16, 2021	January 9, 2023	Republican	Evansville, Indiana	
63		Diego Morales	January 9, 2023	January 1, 2027	Republican	Sellersburg, Indiana	
64		Beau Bayh	January 1, 2027		Democratic	Indianapolis, Indiana	

== See also ==
- Government of Indiana
- List of company registers

== General and cited references ==
- Funk, Arville L. (1983) [1969]. A Sketchbook of Indiana History. Rochester, Indiana: Christian Book Press. pp. 207–209.
- Indiana Chamber (2007). Here's Your Indiana Government 2007–2008 (33rd ed.). Indianapolis: Indiana Chamber of Commerce. ISBN 978-1-883698-79-9.
