= 2014 Indiana elections =

Indiana elections, 2014
- November 4, 2014
- Turnout: 30.24%

A general election was held in the U.S. state of Indiana on November 4, 2014. Three of Indiana's executive officers were up for election as well as all of Indiana's nine seats in the United States House of Representatives. The Republican nominees won all three statewide elections and all of Indiana's U.S. Representatives were re-elected.

== Election information ==
=== Turnout ===
Turnout in the primaries was 13.50%, with 617,156 ballots cast.

Turnout in the general election was 30.24%, with 1,388,965 ballots cast.

In addition to the above information using the standard turnout measurement of turnout among registered voters, the general election turnout among eligible voters was 28.0%. This meant that Indiana had lower voter turnout (percentage-wise) than any other state had in their concurrent elections in regards to their turnout when measuring among eligible voters.

== Secretary of State ==
2014 Indiana Secretary of State election
- November 4, 2014
- Turnout: 29.01%
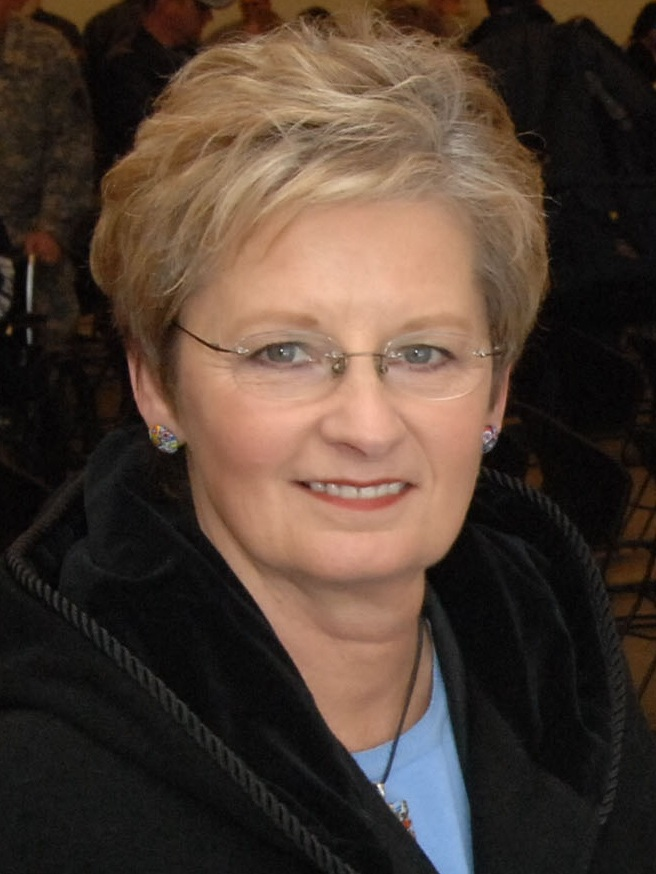

Nominee	Connie Lawson	Beth White
Party	Republican	Democratic
Popular vote	760,921	526,229
Percentage	57.11%	39.49%
- County results Lawson: 40–50% 50–60% 60–70% 70–80% White: 40–50% 50–60%
Secretary of State before election
Connie Lawson
Republican
Elected Secretary of State
Connie Lawson
Republican

Incumbent Republican Secretary of State Connie Lawson, who was appointed to the office in 2012 after Charles P. White was removed from office due to felony convictions, ran for election to a first full term in office. She was unopposed for the Republican nomination.

The Democratic nominee was attorney and Marion County Clerk Beth White (no relation to Charles P. White). She was unopposed for the Democratic nomination.

The Libertarian nominee was Karl Tatgenhorst, a technology executive.

=== Results ===
General Election results
Party	Candidate	Votes	%
Republican	Connie Lawson (incumbent)	760,921	57.11
Democratic	Beth White	526,229	39.49
Libertarian	Karl Tatgenhorst	45,341	3.40
Total votes		1,332,491	100

== Treasurer ==
Indiana State Treasurer election, 2014
- November 4, 2014
- Turnout: 28.84%
Nominee	Kelly Mitchell	Michael Boland
Party	Republican	Democratic
Popular vote	771,136	490,023
Percentage	58.13%	36.99%
- County results Mitchell: 40–50% 50–60% 60–70% 70–80% Boland: 40–50% 50–60%
Treasurer before election
Daniel Huge (interim)
Republican
Elected Treasurer
Kelly Mitchell
Republican

Republican State Treasurer Richard Mourdock was term-limited and unable to run for a third term in office in 2014. He resigned on August 29, 2014, the last day that state employees could retire before cuts to pension benefits took effect in September 2014. Republican Governor Mike Pence appointed chief financial officer and chief operating officer of the Indiana Finance Authority Daniel Huge to serve as interim treasurer until a longer-term replacement could be identified to finish the rest of Mourdock's term.

Three candidates ran for the Republican nomination: financial advisor and candidate for the U.S. Senate in 2010 and for Indiana's 6th congressional district in 2012 Don Bates; Marion Mayor and candidate for Indiana's 5th congressional district in 2012 Wayne Seybold; and director of the TrustINdiana local government investment pool and former Cass County County Commissioner Kelly Mitchell.

In the Republican primary convention, the first ballot was a "relative toss-up" and although no candidate won a majority on the second ballot, Mitchell gained votes. Bates, who was in third place, was dropped after the second ballot. Mitchell won the third ballot, by 860 votes to 497.

The Democratic nominee was former member of the Illinois House of Representatives and candidate for Lieutenant Governor of Illinois in 2010 Mike Boland, who moved to Indiana in 2012 to be closer to his grandchildren. He was unopposed for the Democratic nomination.

The Libertarian nominee was Mike Jasper, an accountant and financial adviser.

=== General Election Results ===
General Election results
Party	Candidate	Votes	%
Republican	Kelly Mitchell	771,136	58.13
Democratic	Michael Boland	490,023	36.99
Libertarian	Michael Jasper	63,683	4.81
Total votes		1,324,842	100

== Auditor ==
Indiana State Auditor election, 2014
- November 4, 2014
- Turnout: 28.91%
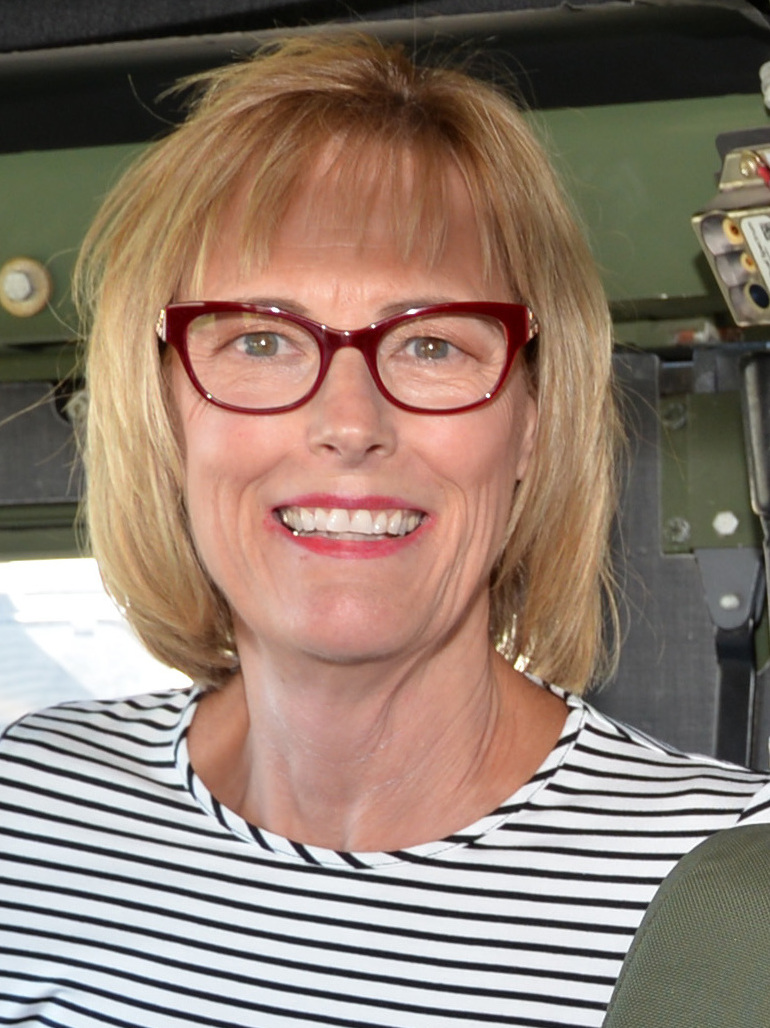

Nominee	Suzanne Crouch	Mike Claytor
Party	Republican	Democratic
Popular vote	791,971	477,689
Percentage	59.64%	35.97%
- County results Crouch: 40–50% 50–60% 60–70% 70–80% Claytor: 40–50% 50–60%
Auditor before election
Suzanne Crouch
Republican
Elected Auditor
Suzanne Crouch
Republican

Incumbent Republican State Auditor Suzanne Crouch was appointed to the office in 2014 to replace Republican Dwayne Sawyer, who had resigned for unexplained personal reasons just three months after replacing the term-limited Tim Berry, who had resigned to become Chairman of the Indiana Republican Party. Crouch ran for election to a first full term in office. She was unopposed for the Republican nomination.

The Democratic nominee was retired Certified Public Accountant, attorney and former Deputy State Examiner of the Indiana State Board of Accounts Mike Claytor. He was unopposed for the Democratic nomination.

The Libertarian nominee was John Schick, a management consultant and candidate for the State House in 2010.

=== General Election Results ===
General Election results
Party	Candidate	Votes	%
Republican	Suzanne Crouch (incumbent)	791,971	59.64
Democratic	Michael Claytor	477,689	35.97
Libertarian	John Schick	58,269	4.39
Total votes		1,327,929	100

== United States House of Representatives ==
All of Indiana's nine seats in the United States House of Representatives were up for election in 2014. The state's seven Republican Representatives and two Democratic Representatives were all re-elected.
