= 1984 Indiana's 8th congressional district election =

- November 6, 1984

Indiana's 8th congressional district
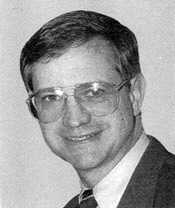

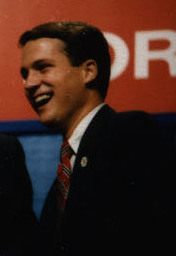
Nominee	Frank McCloskey	Rick McIntyre
Party	Democratic	Republican
Popular vote	116,645	116,641
Percentage	49.83%	49.83%
U.S. Representative before election
Frank McCloskey
Democratic
Elected U.S. Representative
Frank McCloskey (Note: Due to disputes over the election results, McCloskey did not assume office until May 1, 1985.)
Democratic

The 1984 United States House of Representatives election in Indiana's 8th congressional district was held on November 6, 1984, pitting incumbent Democratic Representative Frank McCloskey against Republican nominee Rick McIntyre. The election produced an exceptionally close result and led to a months-long election contest in which the U.S. House of Representatives declined to seat either candidate until completing its own review. Ultimately, the House seated McCloskey on May 1, 1985, after determining he won by four votes.

== Background ==
Indiana's 8th congressional district, which at the time encompassed much of the state's southwestern edge and included population centers such as Evansville and Terre Haute, had a long-standing reputation for intense, closely fought House races and frequent partisan turnover; the seat was known as the "Bloody Eighth", and political writers treated it as a symbol of electoral volatility in Indiana congressional politics. A 1986 profile described it as a mostly rural district stretching from Evansville to the college town of Bloomington, with voters "divided between agrarian populist and conservative Republican," and noted that it had elected five different members of Congress in the previous decade—an indicator of persistent partisan volatility. Retrospective accounts likewise emphasized that the district was a notoriously competitive swing seat, making the thin 1984 result consistent with its broader electoral history.

== Campaign ==
On the Democratic side, incumbent congressman Frank McCloskey was reported to be winning renomination over opponent Vernon Hills by a wide margin. McCloskey had 63,981 votes to Hills's 8,346. McCloskey, the former mayor of Bloomington, first captured the seat in 1982 by unseating Republican incumbent H. Joel Deckard. McCloskey's campaign platform emphasized continuing and improving the nation's economic recovery, pursuing "fuller employment" by keeping interest rates lower and addressing labor problems, and increasing investment in vocational education and public works. On foreign policy, he argued for resolving international conflicts through negotiation rather than military force and criticized President Ronald Reagan's policies in Central America, while describing himself as part of the progressive wing of the Democratic Party despite agreeing with Reagan on some economic issues.

In the Republican primary, state legislator Richard D. McIntyre led the three-way race for the GOP nomination in Indiana's 8th congressional district. McIntyre had 24,267 votes, ahead of Jim Ludwyck with 19,857 and Dave Waggoner with 4,366. Rick McIntyre had been elected to the Indiana House of Representatives in 1980 and reelected in 1982. McIntyre's campaign prioritized the economy, with agriculture and the coal industry as major concerns. He supported a mandated balanced budget (with tax limits tied to economic growth) and favored voluntary school prayer and an anti-abortion amendment.

In the general election, McIntyre said his campaign against incumbent Democrat Frank McCloskey would emphasize support for President Ronald Reagan and the administration's economic approach. He also sought to portray McCloskey as a "big-spending" Democratic liberal and argued that his own views were closer to those of district voters. The same report noted that McCloskey faced only token opposition for the Democratic nomination and highlighted disagreements between McCloskey's voting record and Reagan-backed positions, including matters related to U.S. policy in Lebanon and international financing and budget issues. The Libertarian Party nominated Michael Fallahay, who was a 36-year-old purchasing executive from Bloomington.

=== Election result ===
1984 Indiana's 8th congressional district election results
Party	Candidate	Votes	%
Democratic	Frank McCloskey (incumbent)	116,645	49.83%
Republican	Rick McIntyre	116,641	49.83%
Libertarian	Michael Fallahay	806	0.34%
Total votes		234,092	100.00%
Democratic hold			

== Election contest ==
The 1984 contest produced a rapidly shifting post-election picture. Unofficial election-night returns initially showed incumbent Democrat Frank McCloskey ahead by 72 votes, but after a correction to reported returns from Gibson County the reported total flipped to show Republican Rick McIntyre ahead by 34 votes, the Secretary of State of Indiana, Edwin Simcox, issued McIntyre a certificate of election. A recount then proceeded under Indiana law. Summaries of the dispute reported that the recount produced a McIntyre lead of 418 votes, but that large numbers of ballots were not revisited in the recount process under technical rules applied by state and local officials—an outcome that became central to the competing arguments over whether the state recount had applied consistent standards to all ballots and precincts.

When the 99th Congress convened on January 3, 1985, the House invoked its constitutional authority to judge the elections of its members and adopted House Resolution 1, referring the contest to the Committee on House Administration and directing that neither candidate be sworn while the House conducted its own review; the resolution also provided for payment to both contestants and for the Clerk to handle administrative functions for the district during the vacancy. The committee created a task force and, using auditors associated with the U.S. General Accounting Office (GAO), undertook a ballot review and tabulation under standards set for the House proceeding—an approach that differed in consequential ways from the technical rules used in the Indiana recount and generated repeated partisan disputes over which ballots should be counted and whether uniform standards were being applied across counties and precincts. Indiana's standard is more technical and formality-driven, so ballots that fail prescribed requirements like required clerk initials or endorsements are more likely to be rejected. By contrast, GAO/U.S. House review is more precedent and substance-driven and is not bound by Indiana court rules, so it is more willing to count disputed ballots where strict state technicalities would disqualify them. McIntyre and a voter also pursued federal litigation seeking to compel House officers to seat him based on the state certificate and to halt the House process; federal courts declined to intervene, emphasizing that the matter was committed to the House under Article I, Section 5 of the Constitution. The House voted on May 1, 1985, to seat McCloskey; contemporary reporting described the decision as largely along party lines and noted a Republican walkout in protest.

== Aftermath ==
The dispute left Indiana's 8th district without a seated voting representative for much of the opening of the 99th Congress, with the House providing administrative continuity and compensation to both contestants while the matter was pending under the terms of H.Res. 1 and the Committee on House Administration inquiry. The contest quickly became a national partisan flashpoint and elevated the profile of the district's next campaign, which was widely covered as a direct rematch; President Ronald Reagan campaigned in the district for McIntyre in late October 1986, reflecting the extent to which national party organizations treated the seat as a proxy battle over the legitimacy of the 1985 House decision. In the 1986 general election, McCloskey defeated McIntyre again, 106,662 votes (53.02%) to 93,586 (46.52%), with a Libertarian candidate receiving 909 votes.

The controversy continued shadowing local politics after the House action. In June 1986, federal prosecutors announced indictments alleging vote-buying schemes connected to Democratic campaigns in Southern Indiana in 1982 and 1984, and contemporaneous reporting explicitly linked the investigation to renewed scrutiny of the four-vote 1984 congressional outcome and the broader climate of distrust surrounding election administration in the region. Beyond Indiana, the case entered the literature and congressional practice as a frequently cited example of the constitutional tension between state-run recounts and the House's Article I authority to judge elections, and it has been used in legal and policy analyses of contested-election procedure and institutional incentives in close races.

== Bibliography ==
- Simcox, Edwin (1984). Election Report, State of Indiana. Secretary of State of Indiana – via Google Books.
- United States. Congress. House. Committee on House Administration. Task Force on the Indiana Eighth Congressional District (1985). Appendices, investigation of the question of the right of Frank McCloskey or Richard McIntyre, from the Eighth Congressional District of Indiana, to a seat in the Ninety-ninth Congress pursuant to House resolution 1 : meetings and hearings before the Task Force on the Indiana Eighth Congressional District of the Committee on House Administration, House of Representatives, Ninety-ninth Congress, first session, counties of Crawford ... Washington: U.S. Government Printing Office – via Google Books.
