= 2022 Indiana elections =

Indiana elections, 2022
- November 8, 2022

General elections took place on November 8, 2022, throughout the US state of Indiana.

== Federal offices ==
=== United States Senate ===
Incumbent Todd Young confirmed that he would run for re-election.

== State elections ==
=== Secretary of state ===
In 2021, Republican Holli Sullivan was appointed to the 62nd secretary of state of Indiana by Governor Eric Holcomb.

=== Treasurer ===
Incumbent Republican state treasurer Kelly Mitchell was ineligible to run for re-election for a third term in office due to term limits.

=== Auditor ===
2022 Indiana State Auditor election
- November 8, 2022
Nominee	Tera Klutz	ZeNai Brooks
Party	Republican	Democratic
Popular vote	1,108,377	672,468
Percentage	60.07%	36.44%
- Klutz: 50–60% 60–70% 70–80% 80–90% Brooks: 40–50% 50–60% 60–70%
Auditor before election
Tera Klutz
Republican
Elected Auditor
Tera Klutz
Republican

Incumbent Republican state auditor Tera Klutz ran for re-election. She ran against Democratic ZeNai Brooks and Libertarian 2018 candidate John Schick.

2022 Indiana State Auditor election
Party	Candidate	Votes	%	±%
Republican	Tera Klutz (incumbent)	1,108,603	60.07%	+4.57%
Democratic	ZeNai Brooks	672,531	36.44%	−4.60%
Libertarian	John Schick	64,496	3.49%	+0.03%
Total votes		1,845,326	100.0%	N/A
Republican hold				
