= 2002 Indiana elections =

Indiana elections held in 2002

Indiana elections, 2002
- 2002

== House of Representatives ==
United States House of Representatives elections in Indiana, 2002
Party	Votes	Percentage	Seats	+/–
Republican	840,694	55.26%	6	-
Democratic	640,568	42.11%	3	-1
Libertarian	37,270	2.45%	0	-
Green	2,745	0.18%	0	-
Others	76	<0.01%	0	-
Totals	1,521,353	100.00%	9	-

== Secretary of State ==
Democrat John Fernandez (mayor of Bloomington) and Republican Todd Rokita (Deputy Secretary of State) faced off in this election. Todd Rokita won with 55% of the vote.

Results by county Rokita: 40–50%; 50–60%; 60–70%; 70–80%; Fernandez: 40–50%; 50–60%; 60–70%

== Auditor ==
Republican Connie Nass faced off against Democrat Barbara Huston, and Nass won by a huge margin of nearly 60%.

Results by county Nass: 40–50%; 50–60%; 60–70%; 70–80%; Huston: 40–50%; 50–60%; 60–70%

== Treasurer ==
Republican Tim Berry defeated Democrat Day Smith by a considerably large margin, of around 61%.

Results by county Berry: 40–50%; 50–60%; 60–70%; 70–80%; Smith: 40–50%; 50–60%; 60–70%
