= 2026 Indiana State Comptroller election =

2026 Indiana State Auditor election
- November 3, 2026

Nominee	Jessica Bailey	Elise Nieshalla
Party	Democratic	Republican
Popular vote	959,833	909,968
Percentage	49.84%	47.25%
- Bailey: 40–50% 50–60% 60–70% 70–80% Nieshalla: 40–50% 50–60% 60–70% 70–80%
Auditor before election
Elise Nieshalla
Republican
Elected Auditor
Jessica Bailey
Democratic

An election for Indiana State Comptroller was held on November 3, 2026. Incumbent Republican state comptroller Elise Nieshalla ran for reelection; however, she was narrowly defeated by Democratic nominee Jessica Bailey in an upset. Alongside the concurrent race for Indiana Secretary of State, this was the first statewide race won by a Democrat in Indiana since 2012. Bailey became the first Democrat to win the office since 1982.

== Republican convention ==
=== Candidates ===
==== Nominee ====
- Elise Nieshalla, incumbent auditor

== Democratic convention ==
=== Candidates ===
==== Nominee ====
- Jessica Bailey, Porter County clerk

== Libertarian convention ==
=== Candidates ===
==== Nominee ====
- John Schick, business consultant

== General election ==
=== Post-convention endorsements ===
Jessica Bailey (D)

Labor unions

- Indiana State AFL-CIO

=== Polling ===
Poll source	Date(s) administered	Sample size (Note: Key: A – all adults RV – registered voters LV – likely voters V – unclear)	Margin of error	Elise Nieshalla (R)	Jessica Bailey (D)	John Schick (L)	Undecided
Quantus Insights (R)	October 19–21, 2026	757 (LV)	± 3.8%	42%	37%	3%	14%
Bellwether Research	October 8–11, 2026	896 (LV)	± 3.5%	36%	39%	4%	21%

=== Results ===
2026 Indiana State Comptroller election
Party	Candidate	Votes	%	±%
Democratic	Jessica Bailey	958,086	49.82	+13.38
Republican	Elise Nieshalla (incumbent)	909,236	47.28	–12.79
Libertarian	John Schick	55,900	2.90	–0.59
Total votes		1,923,222	100.0	
Democratic gain from Republican				

==== By congressional district ====
Despite winning the state, Bailey only two congressional districts. Nieshalla won the other seven, one of which elected a Democrat.

District	Bailey	Nieshalla	Representative
1st	60.7%	37.2%	Frank J. Mrvan
2nd	46.1%	51.3%	Rudy Yakym
3rd	42.4%	54.5%	Marlin Stutzman
4th	44.1%	52.6%	Jim Baird
5th	48.3%	48.6%	J. D. Ford
6th	43.4%	53.2%	Jefferson Shreve
7th	77.3%	20.5%	André Carson
8th	41.6%	55.3%	Mark Messmer
9th	44.5%	52.3%	Erin Houchin
