= Mike Claytor =

American accountant, attorney and politician

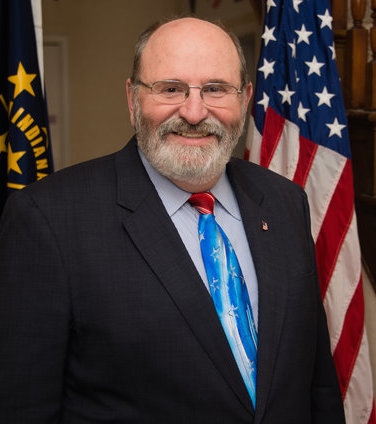
- 2014 Candidate for Indiana State Auditor
- Born: Michael A Claytor; September 30, 1952 (age 73); Hartford City, Indiana, U.S.
- Education: Blackford High School
- Alma mater: Ball State University
- Political party: Democratic
- Spouse: Debbie Winchester (m. 1977)

Michael A. Claytor (b. 1952) is an American accountant, attorney, and politician. Claytor was the Democratic candidate for Indiana State Auditor during the 2014 election cycle, losing the race to Republican Suzanne Crouch. Prior to entering the race for Auditor, Claytor, a licensed CPA, worked for 15 years at the Indiana State Board of Accounts, where he served as Deputy Chief Examiner before transitioning to a career in the private sector and becoming a partner at Crowe Horwath LLP. He retired from the private sector in 2012. Claytor worked as treasurer for the gubernatorial campaign of former state representative John Gregg.

== Childhood and Education ==
Claytor (b. 1952) grew up in Hartford City, Indiana, about 75 miles northeast of Indianapolis. After graduating from Blackford High School in 1970, Claytor attended Ball State University, earning an undergraduate degree in accounting. In 1979, he became a licensed CPA and graduated cum laude with a JD from Indiana University - Indianapolis Law School in 1983.

== Accounting ==
=== Indiana State Board of Accounts ===
In 1974, Claytor started his career with the Indiana State Board of Accounts, serving during the administrations of Governors Otis Bowen and Robert Orr. As Deputy State Examiner, he worked on several white collar crime investigations and other cases concerning corruption and financial accountability in the state of Indiana.

=== Private Sector ===
After 15 years at the State Board of Accounts, Claytor moved on to pursue a career with Crowe Horwath LLP, a public accounting and consulting firm based in Indianapolis. In 1992, after three years working with the firm, he became a partner. He retired in 2012.

== Political career ==
Claytor announced his candidacy for Indiana State Auditor on September 12, 2013, initially challenging incumbent Dwayne Sawyer. Sawyer resigned on November 26, 2013, following Claytor's entrance into the race, and Republican State Representative Suzanne Crouch was appointed to the position. On May 31, 2014, Claytor became the official nominee for the Democratic Party. Claytor would have been the first Democrat to hold the office since Otis E. Cox in 1982.

=== 2014 Election ===
Claytor ran his campaign on the premise of being the first Certified Public Accountant to run for Auditor of State. His platform centered around establishing accountability for taxpayer investments, ensuring proper accounting of state funds, developing a more extensive government transparency portal, restoring independence to the State Board of Accounts, and restoring the independent audit authority of the Auditor's office.

Throughout his campaign, Claytor criticized the state's loss of $500 million in tax revenues due to accounting errors, which were discovered in 2011. He pledged to create an internal audit function in order to prevent similar errors in the future.

In the November 4 elections, Claytor received 36% of the votes, placing second behind Republican Suzanne Crouch.
