= Elise Nieshalla =

American accountant and politician

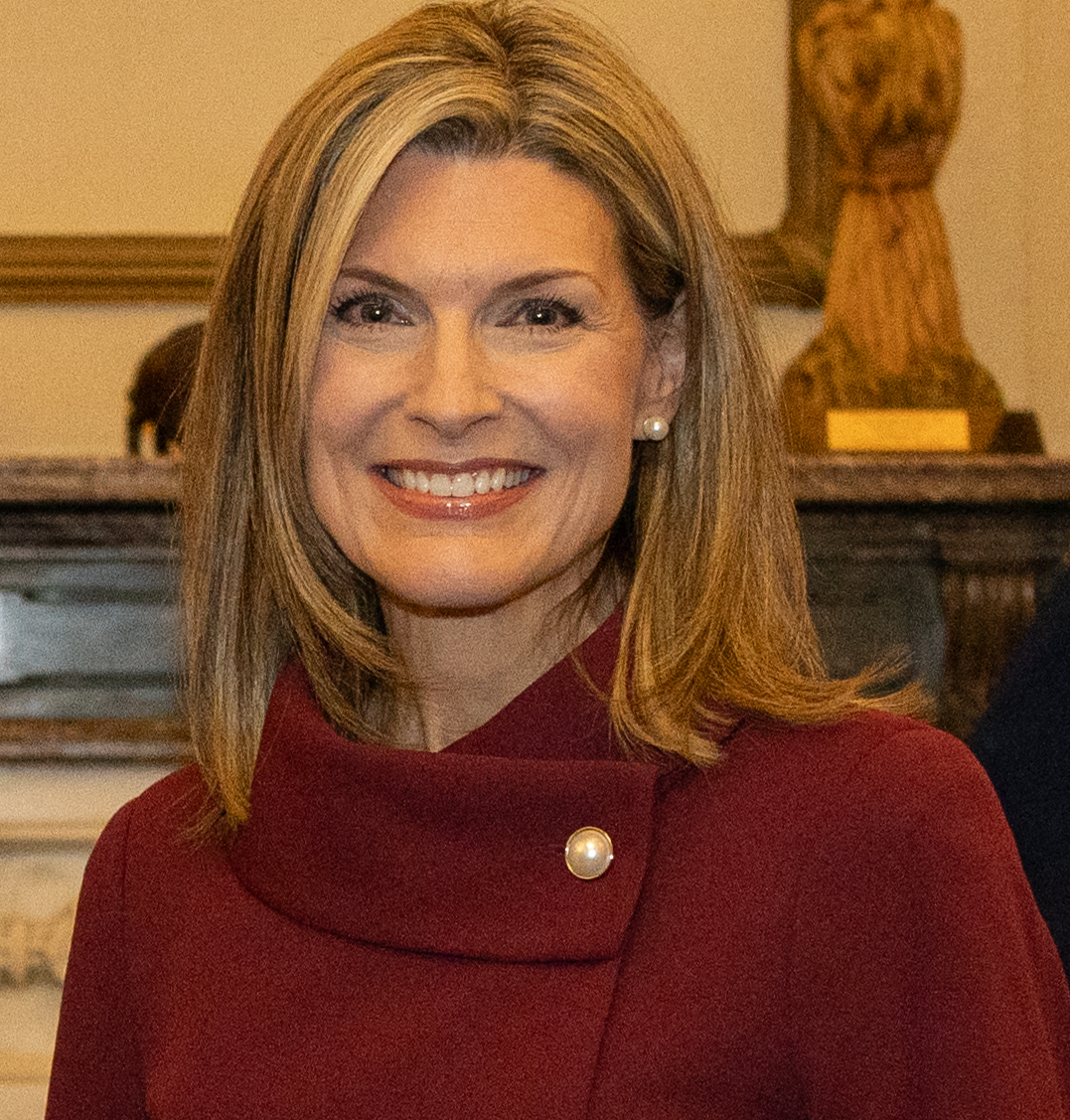
- Nieshalla in 2023

Comptroller of Indiana
- Incumbent
- Assumed office December 1, 2023
- Governor: Eric Holcomb; Mike Braun
- Preceded by: Tera Klutz
- Succeeded by: Jessica Bailey (elect)

Personal details
- Born: June 1972 (age 54)
- Party: Republican
- Education: Oral Roberts University (BS); Indiana University, Indianapolis (MA)

Elise M. Nieshalla (born June 1972) is an American accountant who currently serves as the Comptroller of Indiana. She was appointed to the position after her predecessor, Tera Klutz resigned. Nieshalla lost reelection in 2026, being defeated by Democrat Jessica Bailey.

== Early life and education ==
Nieshalla earned her bachelor's degree from Oral Roberts University and her masters from O'Neill School of Public and Environmental Affairs at the Indiana University Indianapolis. During her time at Indiana University, she taught as adjunct faculty member at the O'Neill School.

== Career ==
Nieshalla served on the Boone County council from 2016 to 2023 including as president from 2021 to 2023. During her time on the board the county won a tax case against Meijer. Nieshalla ran for Indiana State Treasurer in 2022. However, she was eliminated at the state convention.

Nieshalla was appointed by Governor Eric Holcomb on December 1, 2023. Nieshalla ran for a full term in the 2026 election, but lost to Jessica Bailey.

== Personal life ==
Nieshalla resides in Zionsville, Indiana with her husband Chris. They have four children. She is the daughter of former Indiana State Representative Cindy Noe.

Political offices
Preceded by Tera Klutz	Auditor of Indiana; 2023–present	Incumbent
