= ICPAS =

ICPAS may refer to:

- Institute of Certified Public Accountants in Israel
- Institute of Certified Public Accountants of Singapore
- Illinois CPA Society, a US professional society of Certified Public Accountants
- Indiana CPA Society
