= Lawrence Van Buskirk =

American politician

5th Mayor of Bloomington, Indiana
- In office 1891–1897
- Preceded by: Morey M. Dunlap
- Succeeded by: A.M. Hadley

Personal details
- Born: June 21, 1867 Bloomington, Indiana
- Died: November 21, 1910 (aged 43)
- Party: Republican
- Spouse: Alice Allen (m. 1891)
- Education: Indiana University Bloomington, University of Michigan Law School

Lawrence Van Buskirk (June 21, 1867 - November 21, 1910) was mayor of Bloomington, Indiana for eight years in the late 19th century. He was also postmaster and a bank president.

== Education and career ==
He graduated from Indiana University, having studied philosophy (Note: His obituary stated that he was a "graduate of the literary department".) and law, and studied law degree one year at University of Michigan Law School in Ann Arbor, Michigan, having to withdraw due to ill health. He was, though, reported by the Royal Arch Masons of Indiana to have been admitted to the bar. Buskirk was mayor of the city for eight years, postmaster, and president of the First National Bank in Bloomington, Indiana. At the time of his death, he was treasurer at Indiana University.

== Personal life ==
Born in Bloomington on June 21, 1867, he was the son of George A. Buskirk and Martha A. (née Hardesty) Buskirk. His uncle was Samuel Hamilton Buskirk. Both his father and his uncle served as Speaker of the Indiana House of Representatives. Van Buskirk had four siblings, George, Phillip, Martha, and a sister who married Nat U. Hill Sr. On April 22, 1891, Buskirk married Alice Allen, and they had three children: Allen, Lawrence Jr., and Martha.

He was a thirty-third degree Mason, having held the Indiana's second highest position of grand king of the Grand Chapter of Royal Arch Masons and heir to commercial property in Bloomington.

He died at his home on November 21, 1910 and his funeral was held at Indiana University. (Note: At the time of his death, his funeral was the Bloomington's largest to that point and all banks there closed for the event.)

== See also ==
- List of mayors of Bloomington, Indiana
