= Jessica Bailey =

American politician

Auditor–elect of Indiana
- Assuming office January 1, 2027
- Governor: Mike Braun
- Succeeding: Elise Nieshalla

Personal details
- Party: Democratic
- Education: Purdue University Northwest; Walden University

Jessica Bailey is an American politician from Indiana. A member of the Democratic Party, she is the Indiana State Auditor-elect.

Bailey graduated from Purdue University Northwest with a bachelor's degree in liberal arts. She earned a Master of Public Administration from Walden University.

Bailey served on the school board for Portage Township for six years before she was elected to be the county clerk for Porter County, Indiana, in 2018. She was reelected in 2022. She ran in the 2026 election for Indiana State Auditor, and won the Democratic Party nomination without opposition. Bailey defeated Elise Nieshalla, the incumbent.
