= Senator Hume =

Senator Hume may refer to:

- Jane Hume (born 1971), Senate of Australia
- Lindel Hume (born 1942), Indiana State Senate
- Sandy Hume (politician), Colorado State Senate
