= John Fernandez (Indiana politician) =

American politician

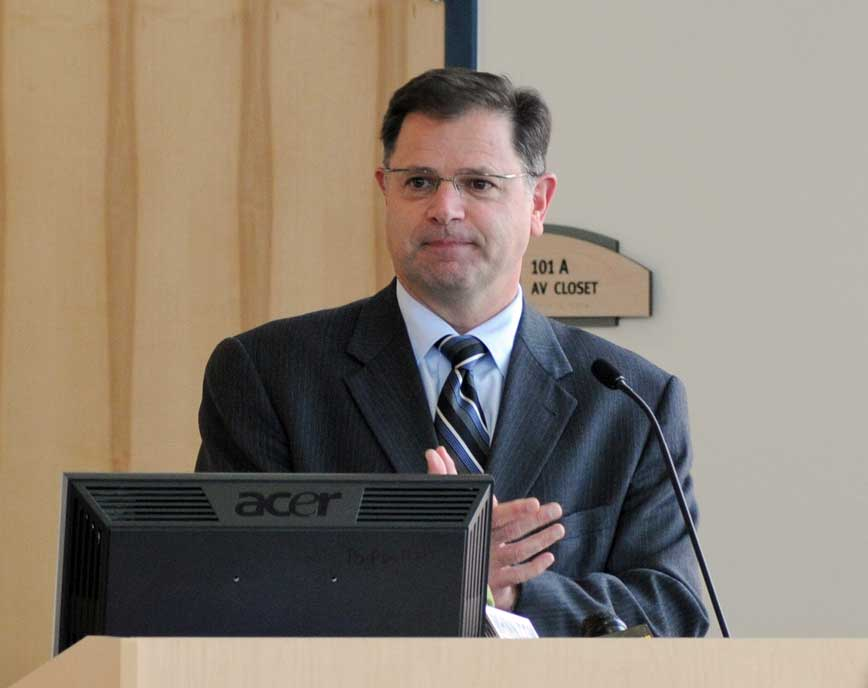
- Fernandez at New York Renewable Energy Cluster event

Assistant Secretary of Commerce for Economic Development
- In office 2009–2012
- Preceded by: Sandy Baruah
- Succeeded by: Jay Williams

Mayor of Bloomington, Indiana
- In office January 3, 1995 – January 3, 2003
- Preceded by: Tomilea Allison
- Succeeded by: Mark Kruzan

Personal details
- Born: November 4, 1960 (age 65) Canton, Ohio, United States
- Party: Democratic
- Spouse: Karen Howe
- Education: Indiana University Bloomington
- Profession: attorney

John Fernandez is an Indiana politician, the former mayor of Bloomington, Indiana from 1995 to 2003. A graduate of Indiana University Bloomington, he was nominated by President Barack Obama to the post of Assistant Secretary of Commerce for Economic Development, leading the Economic Development Administration. Fernandez was sworn into office on September 14, 2009. As the Administrator of the U.S. Department of Commerce's Economic Development Administration (EDA), Fernandez is charged with leading the federal economic development agenda by promoting innovation and competitiveness, preparing American regions for growth and success in the global economy. With over 13 years of executive experience, Fernandez has earned a reputation as a strategic thinker, creative problem solver and effective manager.

Prior to his appointment, Fernandez led the new development and acquisition team at First Capital Group, an Indiana-based real estate investment firm. Fernandez played a critical role in expanding the firm's regional and national investment footprint. Fernandez also served as Of Counsel for Krieg DeVault LLP, an Indianapolis-based law firm, where he advised private and governmental organizations on economic development, public finance and policy issues. Fernandez served as Bloomington, Indiana's mayor from 1996 to 2003. With his leadership, Bloomington's economy thrived despite facing significant changes arising from the new global economy. Fernandez worked with business and Indiana University leaders to launch Bloomington's Life Sciences Partnership, securing more than $243 million in private investments and creating more than 3,700 jobs. He also developed an aggressive downtown revitalization plan resulting in more than $100 million in new investments. A first generation American, Fernandez received a Doctor of Law (J.D.) from Indiana University School of Law in Bloomington. He also earned a Master of Public Affairs (M.P.A.) and Bachelor of Science (B.S.) from Indiana University School of Public and Environmental Affairs also in Bloomington.

== See also ==
- List of mayors of Bloomington, Indiana

Party political offices
Preceded by Cherryl L. Little	Democratic nominee for Secretary of State of Indiana; 2002	Succeeded by Joe Pearson
Political offices
Preceded by Tomilea Allison	Mayor of Bloomington, Indiana; 1995 – 2003	Succeeded by Mark Kruzan
