= Ann G. DeVore =

American politician

51st Auditor of Indiana
- In office December 1, 1986 – December 1, 1994
- Governor: Robert D. Orr; Evan Bayh
- Preceded by: Otis E. Cox
- Succeeded by: Morris Wooden

Personal details
- Born: March 23, 1936 (age 89)
- Political party: Republican

Ann G. DeVore (born March 23, 1936) is an American politician who served as the Auditor of Indiana from 1986 to 1994.

Party political offices
Preceded by Charles D. Loos	Republican nominee for Indiana State Auditor; 1986, 1990	Succeeded by Morris Wooden
