= Mark Kruzan =

American politician

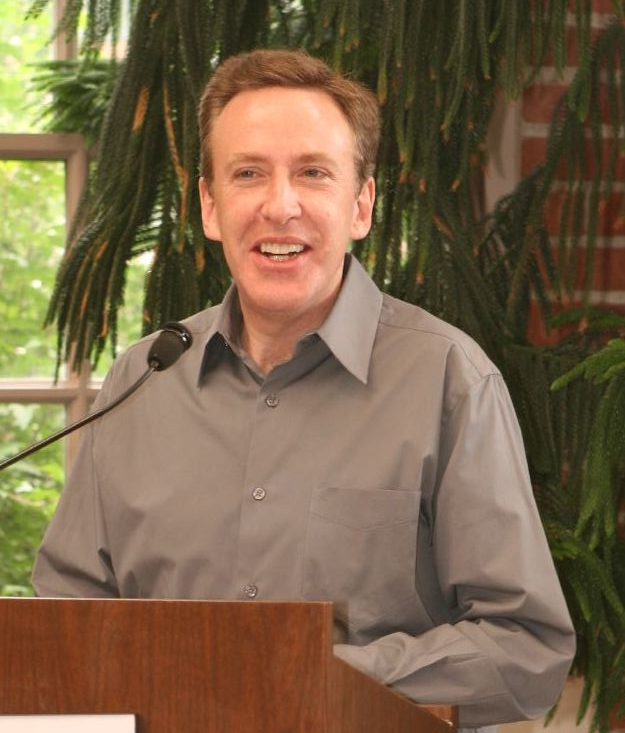

Mayor of Bloomington, Indiana
- In office January 3, 2004 – January 1, 2016
- Preceded by: John Fernandez
- Succeeded by: John Hamilton

Member of the Indiana House of Representatives from the 61st district
- In office November 5, 1986 – November 6, 2002
- Preceded by: Marilyn Frances Schultz
- Succeeded by: Matt Pierce

Personal details
- Born: Mark Richard Kruzan; April 11, 1960 (age 66) Hammond, Indiana, U.S.
- Party: Democratic
- Spouse: Sherry Dunbar-Kruzan
- Education: Indiana University, Bloomington (BA, JD)
- Profession: attorney, adjunct professor

Mark Richard Kruzan (born April 11, 1960) is the former mayor of Bloomington, Indiana, serving from January 3, 2004, to January 1, 2016.

Kruzan was elected as state representative for Bloomington in 1986. In 1994, he was appointed to be the House Minority Whip. In 1996, he was elected by his colleagues as Majority Leader of the Indiana House of Representatives.

== See also ==
- List of mayors of Bloomington, Indiana

Political offices
Preceded by John Fernandez	Mayor of Bloomington, Indiana; 2004 –2016	Succeeded by John Hamilton
