= Tera Klutz =

American politician (born 1975/76)

57th Auditor of Indiana
- In office January 9, 2017 – November 30, 2023
- Governor: Eric Holcomb
- Preceded by: Suzanne Crouch
- Succeeded by: Elise Nieshalla

Personal details
- Born: 1975 or 1976 (age 49–50) Fort Wayne, Indiana, U.S.
- Party: Republican
- Spouse: Zach Klutz
- Children: 2
- Education: Purdue University, Fort Wayne (BS)

Tera Klutz (born 1975/1976) is an American Certified Public Accountant who served as the auditor of Indiana. She was appointed to the position after her predecessor, Suzanne Crouch resigned to become Lieutenant Governor of Indiana in January, 2017.

On July 1, 2023, Governor Eric Holcomb signed legislation into law authorizing the State Auditor to do business as "the State Comptroller". Nevertheless, the formal title of Klutz's office remains "State Auditor", as any permanent change would require a constitutional amendment.

Klutz resigned on November 30, 2023.

== Early life and education ==
Born and raised in Fort Wayne, Indiana, Klutz graduated from Elmhurst High School as the valedictorian of her graduating class. Klutz earned her bachelor's degree in accounting from Indiana University – Purdue University Fort Wayne.

== Career ==
Klutz is a certified public accountant who worked as an accountant and auditor with both PricewaterhouseCoopers and Crowe Global. She won election as the auditor of Allen County, Indiana in 2010 and won re-election in 2014. Before becoming county auditor, Klutz served as Allen County's Chief Deputy Auditor under Lisa Borgmann from 2002 to 2010. From 2013 through 2016, Klutz was active with Association of Indiana Counties’ Legislative Committee. As Chair, she oversaw and directed the Association's legislative priorities by assisting in the analysis and review of proposed legislation and regularly testified before committees of the Indiana General Assembly.

=== Appointment ===
Klutz was appointed by Governor-elect Eric Holcomb on January 2, 2017. She was sworn in on January 9, 2017. She is the first certified public accountant to be Indiana auditor. Nick Jordan, her chief deputy auditor, replaced her as Allen County auditor.

=== Tenure ===
Klutz promised that she will continue to focus on internal controls and increasing transparency through use of technology. On July 19, 2017, Klutz announced that Indiana had a $42 million surplus and reserves of nearly $1.8 billion.

== Personal life ==
Tera is married to Zach Klutz. They have two daughters.

== Awards ==
- Recipient of the 2016 Outstanding County Auditor of the Year award

Political offices
Preceded by Suzanne Crouch	Auditor of Indiana; 2017–2023	Succeeded by Elise Nieshalla
Party political offices
Preceded by Suzanne Crouch	Republican nominee for Indiana State Auditor; 2018, 2022	Most recent
