= Morey M. Dunlap =

American lawyer

4th Mayor of Bloomington, Indiana
- In office 1887–1891
- Preceded by: James B. Mulkey
- Succeeded by: Lawrence Van Buskirk

Personal details
- Born: July 7, 1860 Franklin, Indiana
- Died: 1911 (aged 50–51)
- Party: Republican
- Spouse: Minnie Davis (m. 1885)
- Education: Indiana University Bloomington

Morey McKee Dunlap (1860–1911) was a lawyer and mayor of Bloomington and Anderson, Indiana.

== Early life and education ==
Born in Franklin, Indiana on July 7, 1860, he was the son of James Dunlap (1802–1884), a farmer, and Elizabeth (née Johnston) Dunlap (born 1815). A Dunlap ancestor, John Dunlap, emigrated from northern Ireland in the 18th century and settled in Pennsylvania, served during the American Revolutionary War, and was the first printer of the Declaration of Independence. The Johnstons were of Scottish heritage.

He attended Hopewell Academy, a Presbyterian school near Franklin, Indiana. He then began attending Indiana University in 1880. In the spring of 1885, he represented Indiana University in the Inter-Collegiate oratorical contest, in Indianapolis, ranking second in honors. He graduated in 1885 and again in 1891, when he received his B.L. degree from Indiana University.

== Career ==
In 1885, Dunlap moved to Steubenville, Ohio, where he began reading for the law and then completed his education at Indiana University. Dunlap became the Republican mayor of Bloomington from 1887 to 1891. After his term as mayor, Dunlap moved to Anderson, Indiana, where he set up law offices. Morey became mayor of Anderson in 1894 and again in 1898.

Dunlap was known as a great orator and continued to give speeches even after his career in politics was over, including his Democracy Not a Calamity speech.

== Personal life ==
On November 10, 1885, he was married to Minnie V. Davis (1864–1948), of Bloomington and they had one child: Alan Adair Dunlap (born October 27, 1889). Dunlap died in 1911 while in Denver, Colorado.

== See also ==
- List of mayors of Bloomington, Indiana
