= Rick McIntyre =

American politician (1956–2007)

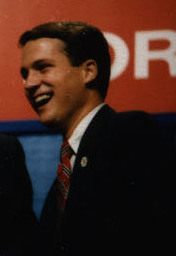

Judge of the Lawrence County Circuit Court
- In office November 19, 1988 – October 30, 2007
- Appointed by: Robert D. Orr
- Preceded by: Linda Chezem
- Succeeded by: Andrea McCord

Member of the Indiana House of Representatives from the 65th district
- In office November 3, 1982 – November 7, 1984
- Preceded by: William Leon Bevers
- Succeeded by: Frank Newkirk Jr.

Member of the Indiana House of Representatives from the 64th district
- In office November 5, 1980 – November 3, 1982
- Preceded by: Merwyn Terry Fisher
- Succeeded by: Kenneth C. Snider

Personal details
- Born: Richard Dean McIntyre; October 5, 1956 Bedford, Indiana, U.S.
- Died: October 30, 2007 (aged 51) Bedford, Indiana, U.S.
- Party: Republican
- Spouse: Meredith Mettlen (m. 1979)
- Children: 3
- Education: University of Colorado; Indiana University

Richard Dean McIntyre (October 5, 1956 – October 30, 2007) was an American lawyer, politician, and judge from the state of Indiana.

== Early life ==
He was born in 1956 and his original ambition was to become a Navy Pilot. He enrolled in Naval air training in Pensacola, but was forced to quit after a knee injury. He then entered law school in Bloomington, Indiana, and also entered the Indiana National Guard, where he became a military lawyer and rose to the rank of Colonel.

== Political career ==
In 1980 he entered politics and ran successfully for the Indiana House of Representatives to which he was reelected two years later.

=== 1984 U.S. House of Representatives election ===
In 1984, he ran for the U.S. House of Representatives against freshman Democrat Frank McCloskey. Initial returns put McCloskey in the lead by 72 votes, but after a tabulation error was found a month later McIntyre took the lead by 34 votes and was certified a winner even though a recount was still underway. The recount was still underway when the new House was sworn in, and so the Democrat-controlled House voted, along party lines, to seat neither contestant, but to pay them both as though they were congressmen. Normally the House seats a certified winner on a provisional basis, but not if a recount is underway.

The recount was completed by the end of January 1985; the final result had McIntyre ahead by 418 votes. He was again certified the winner and, after Republicans forced a vote on the matter, again denied a seat, though the House Administration Committee promised to resolve the matter in 45 days. A federal recount, led by the Government Accounting Office under rules that were mostly agreed upon on bipartisan basis, found that McCloskey won by four votes, though the task force made several controversial decisions which led the task force's lone Republican to compare it to being raped. Republicans then sought to seat neither candidate and have a new election, but the House, on a party-line vote, chose to seat McCloskey causing House Republicans to stage a symbolic walkout, protest with procedural delays and declare the race stolen.

=== Later career ===
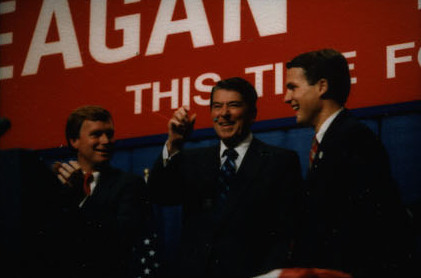
McIntyre with President Reagan and Senator Dan Quayle in 1986

McIntyre was interested in running for Lieutenant Governor in 1986, but was persuaded to seek a rematch with McCloskey. By this time, President Ronald Reagan was less popular than in 1984 and McIntyre was outspent. As a result, McCloskey won by a 53% to 47% margin.

McIntyre lost interest in the national arena and was appointed a Lawrence County Circuit Court Judge in 1988. He was reelected without opposition in 1990, 1996, and 2002, and served until his death.

== Personal life and death ==
McIntyre lived in Bedford, Indiana. He married Meredith Mettlen in 1979, and they had three children.

On October 30, 2007, McIntyre died at his home, aged 51, from an apparent suicide through carbon monoxide poisoning. He was under federal investigation in relation to a scandal involving the purchase of furniture through a military contract. At the time of his death, McIntyre was a member of the Indiana National Guard, 76th Infantry Brigade Combat team, serving as a judge advocate and preparing for deployment to Iraq.

== Notes ==
Indiana House of Representatives
Preceded by Merwyn Terry Fisher	Member of the Indiana House of Representatives from the 64th district 1980–1982	Succeeded by Kenneth C. Snider
Preceded by William Leon Bevers	Member of the Indiana House of Representatives from the 65th district 1982–1984	Succeeded by Frank Newkirk Jr.
Legal offices
Preceded by Linda Chezem	Judge of the Lawrence County Circuit Court; 1988–2007	Succeeded by Andrea McCord
Party political offices
Preceded by H. Joel Deckard	Republican nominee for U.S. Congress for Indiana's 8th district 1984, 1986	Succeeded by John L. Myers
