= Mike Boland (politician) =

American politician

Member of the Illinois House of Representatives from the 71st district
- In office January 11, 1995 – January 12, 2011
- Preceded by: Bob DeJaegher
- Succeeded by: Richard Morthland

Personal details
- Born: August 20, 1942 (age 83) Davenport, Iowa, U.S.
- Party: Democratic
- Spouse: Mary
- Profession: Educator

Mike Boland is an American politician who served in the Illinois House of Representatives, representing the 71st District from 1995 to 2010, and the Democratic nominee for Indiana State Treasurer in 2014. In 2016, Boland ran for the Indiana House of Representatives. However, he lost the general election to Todd Huston.

Born on August 20, 1942, Mike was born and spent part of his childhood in Davenport, Iowa as one of seven children. His family moved to Texas; Boland returned to the Quad Cities area to finish the final two years of high school.

He received his B.A. from Upper Iowa University and his M.S. in education from Henderson State University; as of 2002 he had, from Western Illinois University and the University of Iowa, 48 semester hours of work past his master's degree. Boland spent thirty years as a civics teacher.

Boland's wife, Mary, was a member of the Illinois State Democratic Central Committee from Illinois's 17th congressional district. Mike and Mary have two daughters.

As of 2011, Boland lived in East Moline, Illinois.

== Political life ==
Boland was in the Illinois House of Representatives for 16 years.

He was one of the most forceful voices concerning the admissions controversy at the University of Illinois, in which relatives of politicians close to ex-governor Rod Blagojevich were being admitted more easily by university officials. Boland called on university officials, including B. Joseph White, to resign, saying "They were trusted to protect our university. In my eyes, they failed in that regard and they should resign."

He left the Illinois House of Representatives to run for Lieutenant Governor of Illinois in 2010, but was defeated.

In June 2011, Mike Boland announced that he was running for the Democratic nomination for 17th district congressman, which would then go up against the Republican freshman U.S. Representative Bobby Schilling. Other competitors in the race at that time included Illinois State Senator David Koehler of Peoria; East Moline City Councilwoman Cheri Bustos, Freeport Mayor George Gaulrapp, and Quad Cities immigration lawyer Eric Reyes. However, in October 2011, Boland dropped out of the Congressional race to run instead against incumbent Mike Jacobs for the Democratic nomination for Illinois State Senate in the 36th Legislative District.

Party political offices
Preceded by Pete Buttigieg	Democratic nominee for Indiana State Treasurer; 2014	Succeeded by John Aguilera
