= Tomilea Allison =

American politician (born 1934)

Mayor of Bloomington, Indiana
- In office January 3, 1983 – January 3, 1995
- Preceded by: Frank McCloskey
- Succeeded by: John Fernandez

Personal details
- Born: March 28, 1934 (age 92) Madera, California U.S.
- Party: Democratic
- Spouse(s): James Allison, PhD
- Education: Occidental College

Tomilea "Tomi" Allison (née Radosevich) (born March 28, 1934) was the mayor of Bloomington, Indiana from 1983 to 1995 and served on the city council from 1977 to 1982. A native of Madera, California, she majored in sociology at Occidental College, where she received a bachelor's degree in 1955. From 1957 through 1959 she worked as a deputy probation officer for Fresno and San Bernardino counties. Her two daughters, Devon and Leigh, were born in Ann Arbor, Michigan, where her husband, James, was a graduate student in the University of Michigan Department of Psychology. The family moved to Bloomington in 1963, when he joined the psychology faculty at Indiana University.

She was the first woman to be elected, and second woman to serve as, mayor of Bloomington. She started the Downtown Canopy of Lights. and instigated the founding of the Community Foundation of Bloomington and Monroe County. Her leadership produced a new master plan for the city. She was a prime mover in the conversion of the 19th century Showers furniture factory into a modern facility to house the new city hall. Under her leadership Bloomington received its Tree City designation. Her support of the Parks and Recreation Department set the groundwork for the Thomson Community Park, the Twin Lakes Sports Complex, the Third Street Park, and the Kid City program of affordable summer day care for children.

She is a 2007 inductee into the Monroe County Hall of Fame. She was named "Sagamore of the Wabash" by two Indiana governors, Evan Bayh and Frank O'Bannon. Honors include: The Russell G. Lloyd Distinguished Service Award (Indiana Association of Cities and Towns); Special Recognition, U.S. Conference of Mayors (1993); Lifetime Achievement Award, Greater Bloomington Chamber of Commerce (1995); President, Indiana Association of Cities and Towns (1993–1994); Mayor of the Year, Murat Temple (1995); Citizen of the Year, National Association of Social Workers (1991); Kentucky Colonel (Governor Martha Layne Collins); and Lifetime Achievement Award, Women's History Month (2010). She founded the Commission for Bloomington Downtown. She co-founded, Community Development Conference, Bloomington; Citizens for Good Government, Monroe County; Bloomington Branch, Women's International League for Peace and Freedom; and Verify the Vote, Monroe County.

== See also ==
- List of mayors of Bloomington, Indiana

Political offices
Preceded by Frank McCloskey	Mayor of Bloomington, Indiana; 1983 – 1995	Succeeded by John Fernandez
