= George A. Buskirk =

American lawyer, politician, and businessman

George Abraham Buskirk (born Monroe County, Indiana, August 10, 1829; died Bloomington, Indiana, July 22, 1874) was an American lawyer, politician, and businessman. He was the Speaker of the Indiana House of Representatives in 1869.

== Early life ==
George A. Buskirk was the fifth of six children of George Abram (or perhaps just "Abram") Buskirk and his wife Mary Boswell Buskirk. The family came to Bloomington in 1831; in 1839 his father was serving as postmaster there. Buskirk began to study law in the office of the county circuit court clerk, then attended a year of college at Indiana University in Bloomington. With the start of the Mexican-American War, he enlisted, first in the 1st Indiana Volunteers and then transferring to the Third Indiana Volunteers, which was present at the 1847 Battle of Buena Vista.

After the war Buskirk spent several years in a printer's office before returning to the law, studying for a time with his brother Samuel H. Buskirk. He then took classes and graduated from Indiana University in 1850 with a Bachelor of Laws.

== Career ==
He started a practice and was soon elected Justice of the Peace. In 1856 he was elected as judge of common pleas for Monroe, Morgan County, and Brown County; he was re-elected in 1860, with the district enlarged to include Shelby and Johnson counties.

During the Civil War he was commissioned as a Colonel in the Indiana Legion and given the post of Judge-advocate.

In 1865 the legislature chose him as the state Land Agent, a post that controlled the funds necessary to pay the state debts. His brother Samuel, a Democrat, was a representative at the time and had served as Speaker of the House in 1863. George Buskirk was elected to the Indiana House of Representatives in 1866. In 1868 he was once again elected to the House, as a Republican, and served as Speaker from April 1868 to November 1870.

In 1871 Buskirk organized the First National Bank of Bloomington and served as its president until his death.

== Personal life ==
Buskirk married Martha Ann Hardesty (1827–1894) in 1854. Their children were Anna Mary (Buskirk) Hill (1855–1915), George A. Buskirk Jr. (1857–1931), Martha R. (Buskirk) Haungs (1860–1901), Philip Kearney Buskirk (1862–1907), and Lawrence Van Buskirk (1867–1910). Philip was a successful businessman and served as president of the bank his father had founded; Lawrence served several terms as mayor of Bloomington and also served as president of the bank.

Buskirk exhibited a violent temper at times. On July 15, 1857, he was involved in an altercation with opposing counsel James Hughes in court, swinging a cane at him. On July 2, 1873, while drunk he shot a bartender named Aaron Rose in the chest after Rose refused to serve him, saying his brother Samuel had asked him not to give him more liquor. Rose survived and Buskirk was let off with a $200 fine after Rose refused to prosecute.
