= Indiana CPA Society =

American association

The Indiana CPA Society (INCPAS) is a statewide association representing current or aspiring certified public accountants (CPAs) and related professionals in Indiana. INCPAS was founded in 1915 with nine charter members and has since grown to nearly 7,000 members.

== History ==
In 2013, it launched the INCPAS Scholars career awareness and mentorship program for underrepresented high school students interested in pursuing accounting.

In 2014, it established the CPA Center of Excellence® subsidiary that provides CPAs with competency-based learning on non-technical skills.

In 2015, it celebrated its 100th anniversary.

In 2017, Indiana Gov. Eric Holcomb signed HEA 1467 into law, making Indiana the first state in the nation to count competency-based learning towards continuing professional education (CPE) requirements.
