= Karrah Herring =

American lawyer

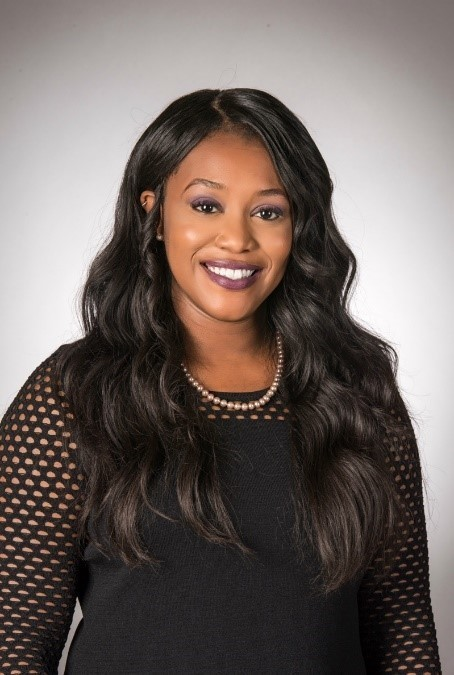

Office of the Chief Equity, Inclusion, and Opportunity

Chief Equity, Inclusion, and Opportunity Officer
- In office November 2020 – January 2025
- Appointed by: Governor Eric Holcomb

Personal details
- Born: South Bend, Indiana
- Education: Purdue University Valparaiso University
- Occupation: Lawyer

Karrah Herring is an American lawyer who was appointed as Indiana's first Chief Equity, Inclusion and Opportunity Officer (CEIOO) by Governor Eric Holcomb and served as CEIOO from November 2020 until January 2025.

== Early life and education ==
Herring was born in South Bend, Indiana. She earned a Bachelors of Arts in Communications/Public Relations from Purdue University in 2005 and a Juris Doctor from Valparaiso University in 2011.

== Career ==
For a decade, Herring worked at the University of Notre Dame. She was the Director of Public Affairs in the Office of Public Affairs and Communications at the university. Then prior to this role, she was the Director of the Office of Institutional Equity and Title IX Coordinator. As the Director of the Office of Institutional Equity and Title IX Coordinator, Herring oversaw workplace compliance with federal and state laws. This included Title IX, Title VII, ADA, EEO, and affirmative action.

In November 2020, Governor Eric Holcomb appointed Herring as Indiana's first Chief Equity, Inclusion and Opportunity Officer. This position was created after Holcomb announced in an address to the state in August 2020 actions that would be taken to "reduce racial inequity in the Hoosier State".

It was in January 2025, that incoming Governor Mike Braun signed a series of 9 executive orders. One of those executive orders eliminated diversity, equity, and inclusion (DEI) in state government. This executive order shuttered the state's Office of CEIOO and removed Herring's position from the governor of Indiana's cabinet, along with four other employees.

== Selected awards ==
- 2022 Distinguished Alumni Award from Purdue University.
- 2022 Forty Under 40, Indianapolis Business Journal.
- 2023 Key to the City, South Bend, IN.
- 2023 Indiana 250 - Civic Leadership, IBJ Media.
- 2023 Rosa Parks Trailblazer Award, Indiana Minority Business Magazine.

== Personal life ==
Herring is married to Ray Herring, and together they have three children, Bryce, Brianna, and Ja'Mari Herring.
