= Arthur Berndt =

American college athlete and coach, politician (1884–1947)

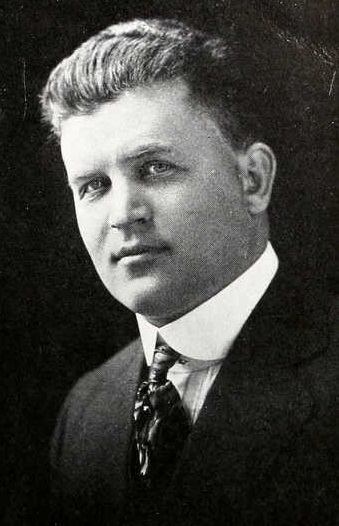
- Berndt from The Arbutus, 1916

Biographical details
- Born: January 26, 1884; Indianapolis, Indiana, U.S.
- Died: July 18, 1947 (aged 63); Bloomington, Indiana, U.S.

Playing career

Football
- 1908–1910: Indiana

Basketball
- 1908–1909: Indiana
- 1910–1911: Indiana

Baseball
- 1908–1911: Indiana
- Position: End (football)

Coaching career (HC unless noted)

Football
- 1911: DePauw

Basketball
- 1911–1912: DePauw
- 1913–1915: Indiana

Baseball
- 1912: DePauw
- 1913–1915: Indiana

Administrative career (AD unless noted)
- 1911–1912: DePauw

Head coaching record
- Overall: 0–5–3 (football); 8–30 (basketball); 27–23 (baseball)

Arthur Henry "Cotton" Berndt (January 26, 1884 – July 18, 1947) was an American football, basketball, and baseball player and coach. He was a multi-sport start at Indiana University Bloomington in the late 1900s, serving as captain of the football, basketball and baseball teams. He was the head coach for the Indiana Hoosiers men's basketball team for the 1913–14 and 1914–15 seasons, compiling a record of 6–21. He remained employed by Indiana University in 1942.

Berndt served as mayor of Bloomington, Indiana from 1935 to 1939. He died on July 18, 1947, at his home in Bloomington, after a long illness.

== Head coaching record ==
=== Football ===
Year	Team	Overall	Conference	Standing	Bowl/playoffs
DePauw (Independent) (1911)
1911	DePauw	0–5–3			
DePauw:		0–5–3			
Total:		0–5–3			

== See also ==
- List of mayors of Bloomington, Indiana
