= Connie Kay Nass =

American politician

- Nass with Congressman Dan Burton in 2001

53rd Auditor of Indiana
- In office January 1, 1999 – January 1, 2007
- Governor: Frank O'Bannon; Joe Kernan; Mitch Daniels
- Preceded by: Morris Wooden
- Succeeded by: Tim Berry

Mayor of Huntingburg, Indiana
- In office January 1, 1988 – January 1, 1996
- Preceded by: Dale W. Helmerich
- Succeeded by: Gail Kemp

Personal details
- Party: Republican
- Spouse: Alan
- Children: 3

Connie Kay Nass is an American politician from the state of Indiana. A member of the Republican Party, she served in various local level positions before serving as Indiana State Auditor from 1999 to 2007.

== Political career ==
In 1980, Nass was elected to Huntingburg Common Council and served two terms.

In 1987, Nass was elected mayor of Huntingburg, defeating six-term Democratic incumbent Dale Helmerich. She served for two terms, and was succeeded in 1996 by Republican candidate Gail Kemp, with no Democrats contesting the election.

Nass retired from politics in 2007 after serving as Indiana State Auditor for eight years. She was accused by Democrats of "injecting partisan rhetoric" into the typically neutral role due to her criticisms of Democratic governor Frank O'Bannon.

Nass later served as chairwoman of Indiana's Abraham Lincoln Bicentennial Commission.

=== Honours ===
In 1990, she was awarded the Protect Our Woods Award. In 2005, she was granted an honorary doctorate in humanities from Oakland City University. In 2006, the Association of Government Accountants gave her an award for exemplary performance. In December of the same year, she was awarded the Sagamore of the Wabash by Indiana governor Mitch Daniels.

== Personal life ==
Nass and her husband, Alan, have two sons (Andy and Stephen) and a daughter (Susan). Her family run a funeral home called Nass & Son. They are members of Salem United Church of Christ in Huntingburg.

Party political offices
Preceded by Morris Wooden	Republican nominee for Indiana State Auditor; 1998, 2002	Succeeded by Tim Berry
