= Samuel H. Buskirk =

American judge (1820–1879)

Associate Justice of the Indiana Supreme Court
- In office November 12, 1870 – January 1, 1877

42nd Speaker of the Indiana House of Representatives
- In office January 8, 1863 – November 9, 1864
- Preceded by: Cyrus M. Allen
- Succeeded by: John Pettit

Member of the Indiana House of Representatives from the ? district
- In office 1865–1865

Member of the Indiana House of Representatives from the ? district
- In office 1863–1863

Member of the Indiana House of Representatives from the Monroe County district
- In office 1851–1852

Member of the Indiana House of Representatives from the ? district
- In office 1848–1849

Personal details
- Born: Samuel Hamilton Buskirk; January 19, 1820 New Albany, Indiana, U.S.
- Died: April 3, 1879 (aged 59) Indianapolis, Indiana, U.S
- Party: Democratic
- Education: Indiana University

Samuel Hamilton Buskirk (January 19, 1820, New Albany, Indiana – April 3, 1879, Indianapolis, Indiana) was a lawyer, politician, and justice of the Indiana Supreme Court.

== Biography ==
Buskirk graduated from Indiana University Bloomington in 1841. After serving as Monroe County recorder from 1844 to 1845, he began practicing law in 1845. He was the Monroe County prosecuting attorney in 1851. Buskirk served five terms in the Indiana House of Representatives and was Speaker of the House in the 1863 session. He was appointed a director of the Indiana State Prison in 1859. He was elected to the Supreme Court of Indiana in 1870 for a term lasting from January 3, 1871, to January 1, 1877, and was appointed by Governor Conrad Baker to a vacancy in the court in November 1870. During his time on the Supreme Court he wrote Buskirk's Practice (1876), a manual of Supreme Court practice.

Buskirk wrote the opinion in the 1874 case Cory v. Carter, which upheld the principle of separate but equal in Indiana schools. It was one of the precedents cited in the United States Supreme Court's 1896 Plessy v. Ferguson decision.

Samuel Buskirk's younger brother, George Abraham Buskirk (1829–1874), was also a lawyer; his brother helped him study law. He served as a district judge and as a state representative in Indiana, and was also elected Speaker of the House in 1869. Another younger brother Edward C. Buskirk (1833–1900), was also a lawyer and a Marion County criminal judge. Edward was the (unsuccessful) Democratic candidate for mayor in Indianapolis in 1879.
