= List of mayors of Bloomington, Indiana =

The following is a list of mayors of the city of Bloomington, Indiana, United States.

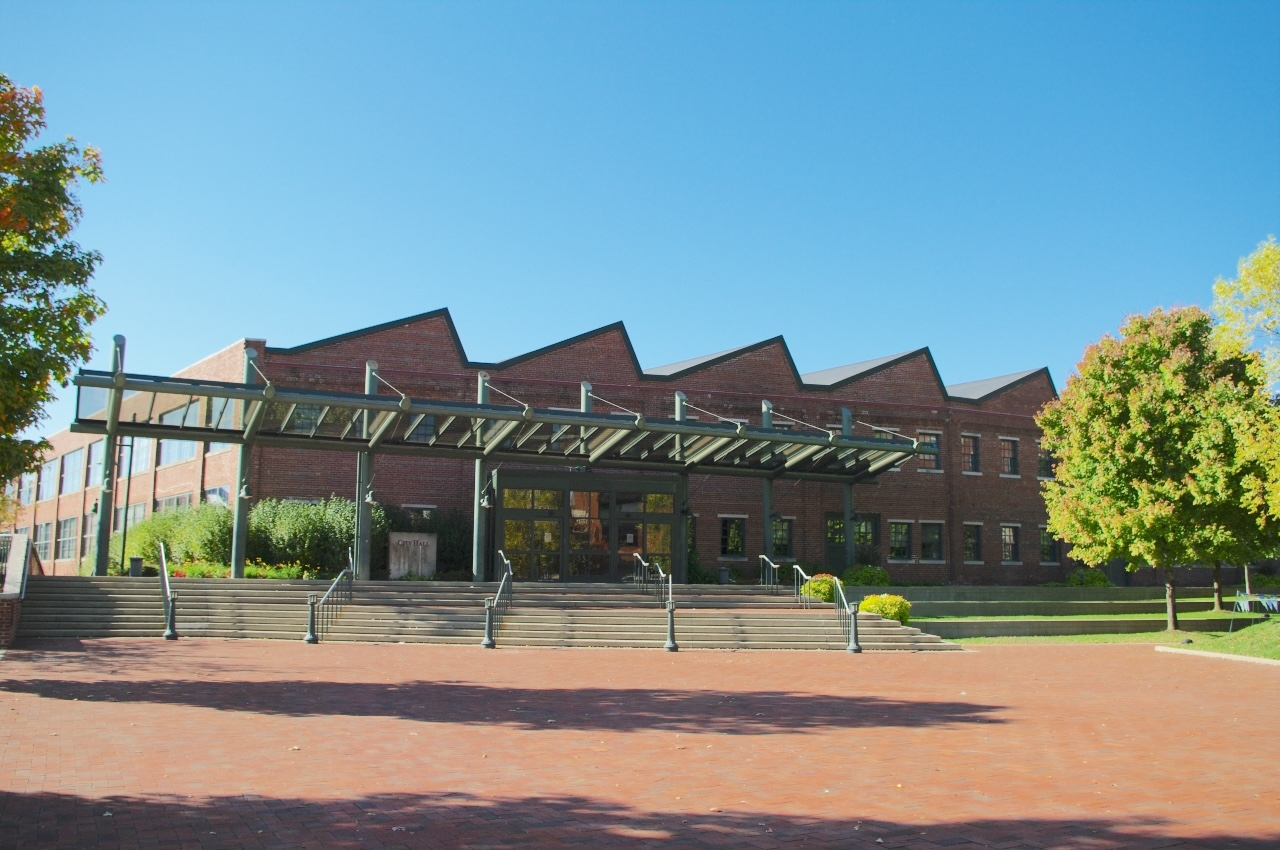
City hall building in Bloomington, Indiana (photo 2009)

- John Lawrence, 1847
- David H. Maxwell, 1848
- John Throop, 1851
- John P Reder, 1852
- Johnathan Moon, 1852–1853
- Carey W. Henderson, 1876–1878
- Clelland F. Dodds, 1878–1885
- Morey M. Dunlap, 1887–1891
- Lawrence Van Buskirk, 1891–1897
- A.M. Hadley, 1897–1902
- Frank J. Dunn, 1902–1904
- Claude G. Malott, 1904–1909
- John G. Harris, 1910–1918, 1922–1925
- W.W. Weaver, 1918–1921
- Lynn B. Lewis, 1925
- John L. Hetherington, 1926–1930
- Joseph H. Campbell, 1930–1934
- Arthur Berndt, 1935–1939
- Loba "Jack" Bruner, 1939–1947
- Tom Lemon, 1948–1952, 1956–1962
- Emmett Kelley, 1952–1956
- Mary Alice Dunlap, 1962–1964
- John Hooker, 1964–1971
- Frank X. McCloskey, 1972–1982
- Tomilea Allison, 1983–1995
- John Fernandez, 1995–2004
- Mark Kruzan, 2004–2016
- John Hamilton, 2016–2023
- Kerry Thomson, 2023–present

== See also ==
- Bloomington City Hall (Indiana), former building, in use 1915–1963
- Bloomington history
