= Suzanne Crouch =

American politician (born 1952)

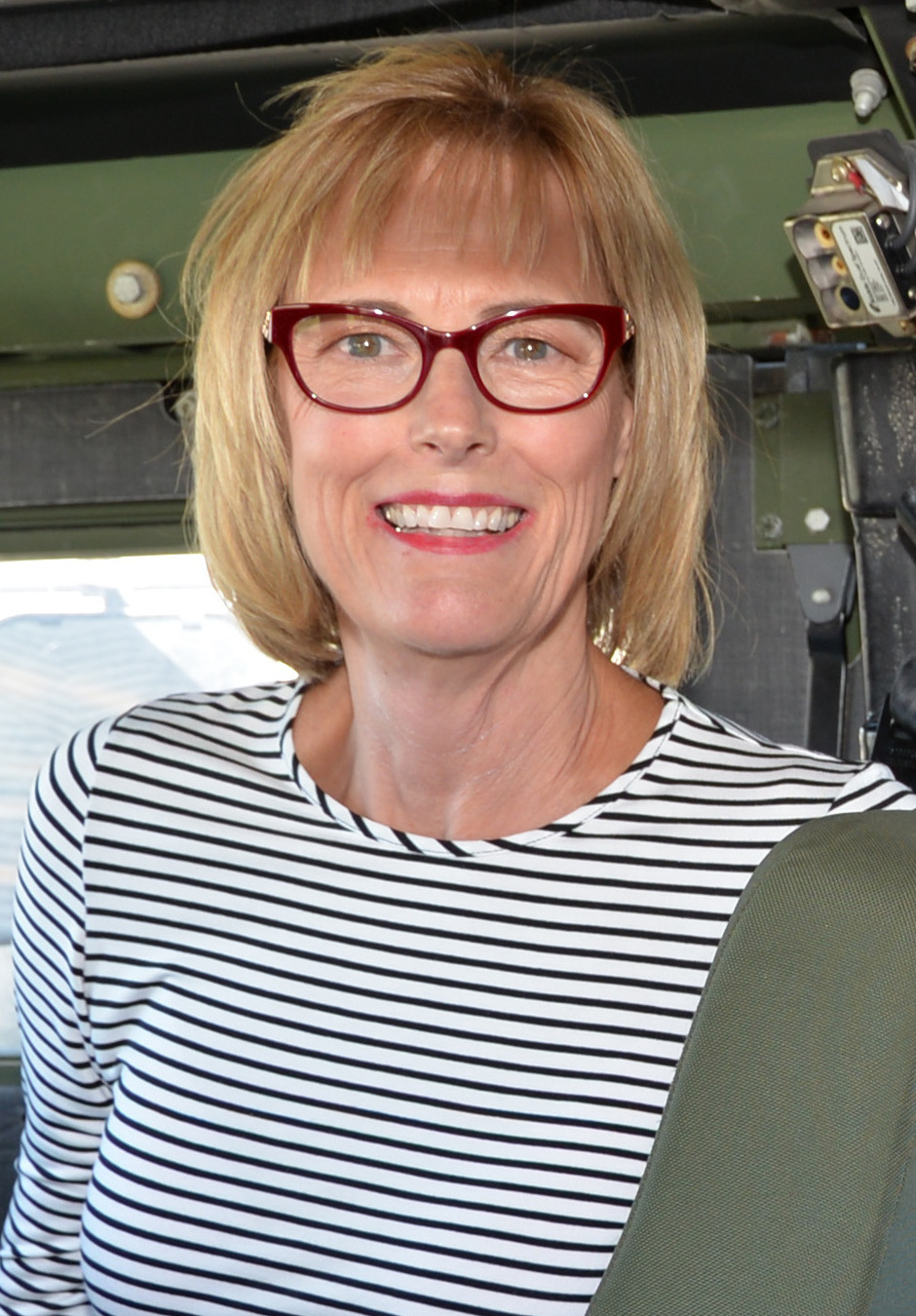

52nd Lieutenant Governor of Indiana
- In office January 9, 2017 – January 13, 2025
- Governor: Eric Holcomb
- Preceded by: Eric Holcomb
- Succeeded by: Micah Beckwith

56th Auditor of Indiana
- In office January 2, 2014 – January 9, 2017
- Governor: Mike Pence
- Preceded by: Dwayne Sawyer
- Succeeded by: Tera Klutz

Member of the Indiana House of Representatives from the 78th district
- In office October 16, 2005 – January 1, 2014
- Preceded by: Vaneta Becker
- Succeeded by: Holli Sullivan

Personal details
- Born: February 27, 1952 (age 74) Evansville, Indiana, U.S.
- Party: Republican
- Spouse: Larry Downs
- Children: 1
- Education: Purdue University (BA)

Suzanne Crouch (born February 27, 1952) is an American politician who served as the 52nd lieutenant governor of Indiana, from 2017 to 2025. She previously served as the 56th state auditor of Indiana from 2014 to 2017. In 2024 she ran for governor of Indiana, losing the primary election to U.S. Senator Mike Braun.

A member of the Republican Party, Crouch served in the Indiana House of Representatives from 2005 to 2014. On December 15, 2013, Governor Mike Pence appointed her to serve as the 56th state auditor of Indiana. Crouch was reelected to that position in 2014. She resigned as state auditor following her election as lieutenant governor of Indiana in 2016.

== Early life ==
Crouch graduated from Mater Dei High School in Evansville and received her Bachelor of Science degree from Purdue University as a political science major.

== County government ==
=== County Auditor ===
Crouch was elected Vanderburgh County Auditor in 1994 and served two terms.

=== Vanderburgh County Commissioner ===
Crouch was elected to the Vanderburgh County Board of Commissioners in 2002.

== Indiana State Representative ==
In 2005 was elected to the Indiana State Representative representing district 78.

== Indiana State Auditor ==
After Indiana State Auditor Dwayne Sawyer resigned in 2013, Crouch was appointed to fill the position. In 2014, after the completion of Sawyer's term, the Republican Party of Indiana officially nominated Crouch for that year's election. On November 4, Crouch was elected by 23 points over Democratic nominee Mike Claytor, with 59.6% of the vote.

== Lieutenant governor ==
=== 2016 election ===
After Governor Mike Pence was named Donald Trump's running mate in the 2016 presidential election, he had to withdraw from the gubernatorial election. Eric Holcomb, the lieutenant governor of Indiana, was chosen as Republican nominee for governor, and Crouch as the nominee for lieutenant governor.

== Electoral history ==
Indiana State House of Representatives 78th District Republican primary election, 2006
| Party | Candidate | Votes | % |
| Republican | Suzanne Crouch (inc.) | 4,032 | 62.68 |
| Republican | Jonathan "Jon" Fulton | 2,401 | 37.32 |

Indiana State House of Representatives 78th District election, 2006
| Party | Candidate | Votes | % |
| Republican | Suzanne Crouch (inc.) | 21,300 | 100.00 |

Indiana State House of Representatives 78th District election, 2008
| Party | Candidate | Votes | % |
| Republican | Suzanne Crouch (inc.) | 26,510 | 70.27 |
| Democratic | James Pete Rapp | 11,214 | 29.73 |

Indiana State House of Representatives 78th District election, 2010
| Party | Candidate | Votes | % |
| Republican | Suzanne Crouch (inc.) | 20,866 | 75.99 |
| Democratic | Steven Smith | 6,594 | 24.01 |

Indiana State House of Representatives 78th District election, 2012
| Party | Candidate | Votes | % |
| Republican | Suzanne Crouch (inc.) | 21,991 | 100.00 |

Indiana Auditor Election, 2014
| Party | Candidate | Votes | % |
| Republican | Suzanne Crouch | 793,633 | 59.62 |
| Democratic | Michael Claytor | 479,109 | 35.99 |
| Libertarian | John Schick | 58,332 | 4.38 |

== See also ==
- List of female lieutenant governors in the United States

Political offices
| Preceded by Erin Sheridan; Acting | Auditor of Indiana; 2014–2017 | Succeeded by Tera Klutz |
| Preceded by Eric Holcomb | Lieutenant Governor of Indiana; 2017–2025 | Succeeded by Micah Beckwith |
Party political offices
| Preceded by Tim Berry | Republican nominee for Auditor of Indiana; 2014 | Succeeded by Tera Klutz |
| Preceded by Eric Holcomb; Withdrawn | Republican nominee for Lieutenant Governor of Indiana; 2016, 2020 | Succeeded by Micah Beckwith |
