= Tim Berry (politician) =

American politician (born 1961)

Chair of the Indiana Republican Party
- In office July 22, 2013 – April 30, 2015
- Preceded by: Eric Holcomb
- Succeeded by: Jeff Cardwell

54th Auditor of Indiana
- In office January 1, 2007 – August 13, 2013
- Governor: Mitch Daniels; Mike Pence
- Preceded by: Connie Kay Nass
- Succeeded by: Dwayne Sawyer

52nd Treasurer of Indiana
- In office February 10, 1999 – January 1, 2007
- Governor: Mitch Daniels; Frank O'Bannon
- Preceded by: Joyce Brinkman
- Succeeded by: Richard Mourdock

Personal details
- Born: August 1, 1961 (age 65) Fort Wayne, Indiana, U.S.
- Party: Republican
- Spouse: Kim Berry
- Education: Bowling Green State University (BBA); Indiana University Bloomington (MBA)

Timothy J. Berry (born August 1, 1961) is an American politician who served as the state auditor of Indiana from 2007 to 2013 and as State Treasurer of Indiana from 1999 to 2007. He resigned as state auditor after being elected chairman of the Indiana Republican Party on July 22, 2013. He left his post as State Party Chairman on April 30, 2015. He was replaced by Jeff Cardwell.

== Early life and education ==
Born in Fort Wayne, Indiana, Berry graduated from Wayne High School in 1980. Berry received his Bachelor of Business Administration from Bowling Green State University, and his Master of Business Administration from the Indiana University School of Business.

== Career ==
Berry worked as an administrative assistant in the office of then-Fort Wayne mayor Paul Helmke before working as a financial officer for North American Van Lines.

Berry was elected Treasurer of Allen County, Indiana, in 1990, being reelected to a total of two terms, serving in that position until 1999. During his time as Allen County Treasurer, Berry served as the president of the Indiana Association of County Treasurers in 1995.

Berry served as state treasurer between 1999 and 2007.

He began serving in the position of Indiana state auditor on January 1, 2007. He was re-elected in 2010 against Sam Locke by a large margin. He resigned the post effective August 13, 2013, after having become Chairman of the Indiana Republican Party.

He was elected as Chairman of the Indiana Republican on July 22, 2013. He was recommended for the post by Mike Pence on July 3, 2013. Under his leadership, Indiana Republicans swept the statewide races with an all-female ticket and expanded supermajorities in both chambers of the Statehouse in November 2014. The state's Republican incumbents also retained their seats in the U.S. House of Representatives. On March 12, 2015, Berry announced his resignation as State Party Chairman. He promised to serve until April 2015. He was replaced by Jeff Cardwell.

== Personal life ==
Berry is married with two children and a member of the Trinity English Lutheran Church in Fort Wayne. He is a self-described "hockey dad".

Party political offices
Preceded by Joyce Brinkman	Republican nominee for Indiana State Treasurer; 1998, 2002	Succeeded by Richard Mourdock
Preceded by Connie Kay Nass	Republican nominee for Indiana State Auditor; 2006, 2010	Succeeded by Suzanne Crouch
Political offices
Preceded by Joyce Brinkman	Treasurer of Indiana; 1999–2007	Succeeded by Richard Mourdock
Preceded by Connie Kay Nass	Auditor of Indiana; 2007–2013	Succeeded by Dwayne Sawyer
Preceded by Eric Holcomb	Chairman of the Indiana Republican Party; 2013–2015	Succeeded by Jeff Cardwell
