= Frank McCloskey =

American politician (1939–2003)

Coordinates: 38°52′45″N 77°04′08″W

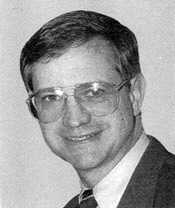

Member of the U.S. House of Representatives from Indiana's 8th district
- In office May 1, 1985 – January 3, 1995
- Preceded by: Himself (Note: Election contested and the House of Representatives refused to seat anyone.)
- Succeeded by: John Hostettler
- In office January 3, 1983 – January 3, 1985
- Preceded by: H. Joel Deckard
- Succeeded by: Himself

Mayor of Bloomington, Indiana
- In office 1972–1983
- Preceded by: John H. Hooker Jr.
- Succeeded by: Tomilea Allison

Personal details
- Born: Francis Xavier McCloskey; June 12, 1939 Philadelphia, Pennsylvania, US
- Died: November 2, 2003 (aged 64) Bloomington, Indiana, US
- Resting place: Arlington National Cemetery
- Party: Democratic
- Spouse: Roberta Ann Barker (m. 1962)
- Children: 2
- Education: Indiana University (BA, JD)
- Profession: Lawyer; journalist
- Committees: Armed Services, 1983 to 1995; Small Business, 1983–1985; Post Office and Civil Service, 1985–1995; Foreign Affairs, 1989–1995

Military service
- Branch/service: United States Air Force
- Years of service: 1957–1961
- Rank: Sergeant

Francis Xavier McCloskey (June 12, 1939 – November 2, 2003) was an American journalist, lawyer, and politician from Indiana who served in the United States House of Representatives as a Democrat from 1983 to 1995.

== Early life and education ==
He was born in Philadelphia, Pennsylvania, and later moved to Bloomington, Indiana after receiving an undergraduate (majoring in political science) and J.D. degree from Indiana University Maurer School of Law. He was the Democratic nominee for a seat in the Indiana House of Representatives in 1970. Frank McCloskey worked as a reporter for The Indianapolis Star, the Bloomington Herald-Telephone, and the City News Bureau of Chicago.

== Mayor of Bloomington ==
McCloskey was elected mayor of Bloomington in 1971, the year he graduated law school, by defeating two-term Republican incumbent John H. Hooker Jr., and served through his election to the 98th Congress in 1982. While mayor, he was credited with helping obtain federal funds to help improve city services and revitalize the city's downtown area. His administration also developed Bloomington Transit, the city's bus service. He was re-elected mayor in 1975 and 1979. In 1981, McCloskey was elected president of the Indiana Association of Cities and Towns. Additionally, he served on a 10-member task force created by the U.S. Conference of Mayors created to study urban financial policy.

Mayor McCloskey was an alternate delegate to the 1972 Democratic National Convention.

== Congressional tenure ==
=== 1982 election and first term ===
Initially, Mayor McCloskey was an underdog in his race against two-term incumbent Republican representative Joel Deckard in Indiana's 8th congressional district. McCloskey's campaign focused on the effects of Reaganomics, and attempted to tie the district's high unemployment rate to Deckard and President Reagan after Deckard supported Reagan on key tax cut and budget votes in the 97th Congress. Some of the district's counties were experiencing unemployment rates not seen since the Great Depression. During the campaign, McCloskey argued for deferral or elimination of a 10 percent tax cut scheduled in 1983 and for cuts in military spending. McCloskey also attacked Deckard for waffling on the nuclear freeze issue after the incumbent co-sponsored both the stronger and weaker versions of the freeze resolution. McCloskey's campaign was further boosted after Deckard was involved in a drunk driving incident shortly before the election. McCloskey significantly benefited from the support of Michael Vandeveer, the popular Democratic mayor of Evansville, the district's largest city, and emerged the victor on election night, 52% to 48%. McCloskey thus became the sixth challenger since 1966 to unseat an incumbent in what had become known as "the Bloody 8th".

Upon arriving in Washington, McCloskey sought a seat on the Appropriations Committee, but was rebuffed by then-Majority Leader Jim Wright, who told him first-term members of Congress rarely obtain a seat on that committee. McCloskey instead was given a seat on the Armed Services Committee, where he served throughout his congressional career, and gained a reputation as one of the committee's most liberal members. He was a vocal critic of Pentagon spending during his first term. Knowing he would be a target in 1984, he returned to the district often, and focused on areas of importance to his constituents, such economic development, uses for high-sulfur coal mined in the district, and farm credit. In the 1984 contest for the Democratic nomination for President, McCloskey supported Colorado Senator Gary Hart over Walter Mondale and Jesse Jackson.

=== 1984 re-election and controversial recount ===
After McCloskey accumulated a liberal voting record by opposing President Reagan over 80% of the time during his first year in office, Republicans recruited 28-year-old, two-term conservative state Representative Rick McIntyre to challenge McCloskey in 1984. McIntyre hailed from small Lawrence County in the northeastern part of the district, and spent much of the election boosting his profile in the populous Evansville area. McCloskey, however, spent much of his first term tending politically to Evansville, and retained the support of the still popular Vandeveer. Ultimately, McCloskey ran up large margins in Evansville and Vanderburgh County.

In this election cycle, President Reagan carried the district 60% to 39%. Benefiting from this strong Republican turnout, McIntyre trailed McCloskey by only 72 votes after the initial vote count. A tabulation error in two precincts of one county was found to have resulted in an overcounting of McCloskey votes, and Indiana's Secretary of State (a Republican) quickly certified McIntyre as the winner by 34 votes without checking other counties, even though a recount in another county showed McCloskey with an overall lead of 72 votes. After a recount, McIntyre was up by 418 votes, but more than 4,800 ballots were not recounted for technical reasons. The Democratic-controlled House refused to seat either McIntyre or McCloskey and conducted their own recount. A task force, consisting of two Democrats and one Republican, hired auditors from the U.S. General Accounting Office to do the counting. The recount dragged on for nearly four months, with three Republican-sponsored floor votes to seat McIntyre failing. The task force, per House rules, instructed the auditors to ignore many of the "technicalities" that resulted in Indiana officials throwing out ballots. In the end, the House seated McCloskey on May 1, 1985, after declaring him the winner by just four votes (116,645 to 116,641). The vote to seat McCloskey, 230–195, was largely along partisan lines and in response every Republican House member momentarily marched out of the chamber in symbolic protest.

=== Subsequent service ===
==== 99th Congress ====
Once sworn in for a second term, McCloskey used his position on the Armed Services Committee to prohibit job contracting at the Crane Weapons Center. Following the 1986 U.S. airstrikes on Libya, McCloskey sponsored legislation blocking the Marine Corps from buying bulldozers from a company partially owned by the Libyan government.

Meanwhile, McIntyre sought a rematch in 1986. However, he still faced a geographical disadvantage, and emotions over the bitter recount had faded. McCloskey took advantage of his incumbency and touted his work for Crane, even bringing in Les Aspin to promise the district Crane would not be closed. McCloskey was also able to leverage his incumbency into positive publicity after investigating possible PCB contamination from a Union Carbide plant on the district's border. Seeking to be more than a candidate who was robbed of victory, McIntyre unsuccessfully tried to find an issue he could capitalize on, and ended up criticizing McCloskey's tenure as mayor of Bloomington and his criticisms of the Vietnam War in the 1970s. Despite having no evidence in support of his claim, McIntyre alleged McCloskey had once smoked opium. These false allegations backfired, and without having to fight Reagan's coattails, McCloskey won the rematch by a more comfortable margin, 106,662 (53%) to 93,586 (47%), carrying nine of the district's 16 counties, including another convincing victory in Evansville.

==== 100th Congress ====
By his third term, in the 100th Congress, McCloskey had risen to chair of the Postal Personnel and Modernization subcommittee. From this position, he held hearings to determine if toxic biological agents, such as anthrax, should be banned from the U.S. Mail. After investigating the issue, and discovering such a ban could be damaging to medical research, McCloskey adopted a position of strict enforcement of the existing regulations. McCloskey, from his position on the Armed Services Committee, played a high-profile role in the battle over President Reagan's Strategic Defense Initiative, and argued SDI was a violation of the 1972 U.S.–Soviet ABM Treaty. Following a night-time collision of two military helicopters in neighboring Fort Campbell, Kentucky, McCloskey also launched a probe into military flight accidents linked to the use of night vision goggles. McCloskey was re-elected with 62% of the vote, his highest percentage, in 1988 against little-known newspaper publisher John L. Meyers, who shared a similar name to neighboring Congressman John T. Meyers. Despite his liberal voting record, McCloskey's attention to local issues and efforts to bring money back to the district earned him the support of both Evansville daily newspapers in the 1988 campaign.

==== 101st Congress ====
In the 101st Congress McCloskey authored a bill enacted requiring a disclaimer on any non-governmental mailings that use an emblem or other identifying symbol to mislead consumers into believing the mailing is a government document. In addition to barring these deceptive mailings, McCloskey sponsored legislation, also enacted, requiring child-proof containers for any potentially harmful drugs and household products sent through the mail. McCloskey moderated his military spending views somewhat in his fourth term, voting against halting production of the B-2 stealth bomber and opposing efforts to eliminate the development of the V-22 Osprey helicopter. Not uncoincidentally, the hybrid airplane-helicopter's engines were built in Indiana.

Facing Evansville coal-mining executive Richard Mourdock in the 1990 election, McCloskey was reelected with 55% of the vote. Mourdock capitalized on an anti-incumbent trend and criticized McCloskey for his votes for a congressional pay raise and tax increases.

==== 102nd Congress ====
In the 102nd Congress McCloskey opposed the use of force against Iraq in 1991. However, it was at this time when McCloskey first became a leader in the effort to take strong action, including military intervention, in the Balkans. McCloskey would maintain a passion and interest in the region for the remainder of his life. McCloskey was critical of President George H. W. Bush's "hands-off" approach to the conflict, and later voiced similar criticisms of President Clinton's reluctance to engage in a solution.

1992 saw McCloskey's first congressional election in which his hometown of Bloomington was completely within the boundaries of the 8th District. McCloskey faced a rematch with Mourdock. By this time, the anti-incumbent sentiment in the nation was even stronger, but McCloskey retained his seat with 53% of the vote. McCloskey's lower 1992 margin, coming at the same time that Bill Clinton became the first Democratic presidential candidate to win the 8th District since 1964 and then-Governor Evan Bayh carried all of the district's counties in his re-election bid, was partly attributed to McCloskey's 65 overdrafts at the House bank. McCloskey's efforts to save jobs at the district's Crane Naval Surface Weapons Warfare Center helped secure his re-election.

During his tenure in Congress, McCloskey made many trips to Bosnia, and spent his post-congressional years working to bring peace and stability to Bosnia and the Balkans. In recognition of these efforts, a bridge over Miljacka in Sarajevo is named in his honor. Samantha Power recounted these efforts in her 2002 book, A Problem from Hell: America and the Age of Genocide.

=== 1994 election defeat ===
In 1994, McCloskey's Republican opponent was John Hostettler, an engineer from the Evansville suburbs who claimed the Republican nomination on the strength of strong support from area churches. Ultimately, McCloskey lost to Hostettler, 52% to 48%. He was one of 34 Democratic incumbents unseated that year. During the 103rd Congress, McCloskey supported the assault weapons ban, a vote which undermined his blue-collar labor and rural support. Hostettler sought to tie McCloskey to Clinton, referring to the Congressman as "Frank McClinton". Unlike in previous elections, where he ran up large margins, he only carried Vanderburgh County by a very small margin. McCloskey narrowly lost Martin County, home to the Crane NSW center he had spent his congressional career fighting to keep open.

=== Election history ===
Year	Office	Election	Subject	Party	Votes	Pct	Opponent	Party	Votes	Pct
1994	Congress, 8th district	General	Frank McCloskey (Inc.)	Democratic	84,857	47.6%	John Hostettler	Republican	93,529	52.4%
1992	Congress, 8th district	General	Frank McCloskey (Inc.)	Democratic	125,244	53.0%	Richard Mourdock	Republican	108,054	45.7%
1990	Congress, 8th district	General	Frank McCloskey (Inc.)	Democratic	97,465	54.7%	Richard Mourdock	Republican	80,645	45.3%
1988	Congress, 8th district	General	Frank McCloskey (Inc.)	Democratic	141,355	61.8%	John L. Myers	Republican	87,321	38.2%
1986	Congress, 8th district	General	Frank McCloskey (Inc.)	Democratic	106,662	53.3%	Rick McIntyre	Republican	93,586	46.7%
1984	Congress, 8th district	General	Frank McCloskey (Inc.)	Democratic	116,645	50.0%	Rick McIntyre	Republican	116,641	50.0%
1982	Congress, 8th district	General	Frank McCloskey	Democratic	100,592	51.7%	H. Joel Deckard (Inc.)	Republican	94,127	48.3%

== Life after Congress ==
Following his 1994 defeat, McCloskey was elected chair of the Monroe County Democratic Party. In addition to his work on achieving peace in the Balkans, he was named director of Kosovo programs for the National Democratic Institute for International Affairs in 2002.

=== McCloskey Fellowship ===
Indiana University's Russian and East European Institute and the NDI announced an endowment at Indiana University in McCloskey's honor in 2005. The McCloskey Fellowship brings one scholar every year from the Balkans to Indiana University and Washington, D.C., to conduct academic research, or is awarded to one Indiana University student whose work focuses on the Balkans or residents of the Balkan region.

== Death ==
McCloskey died in Bloomington on November 2, 2003, following a year-long battle with bladder cancer. As a veteran of the United States Air Force (1957–1961), he was interred at Arlington National Cemetery, in Arlington, Virginia. Rep. McCloskey and his wife, Roberta, were married for over 41 years and had two children — Helen and Mark. The Woodbridge Station United States Post Office in Bloomington is now named after Rep. McCloskey, who served on the Post Office and Civil Service Committee in the House. A part of Indiana Highway 45 from Bloomington heading west is also named for McCloskey. In Sarajevo, Bosnia & Herzegovina, a bridge over the river Miljacka is named as the "Congressman McCloskey Bridge" in honor of his deeds and help to the country during the Balkan Wars. McCloskey's widow Roberta died from cancer on February 2, 2005, at the age of 61 in Bloomington.

== See also ==
- List of mayors of Bloomington, Indiana

== Notes ==
U.S. House of Representatives
Preceded by H. Joel Deckard	United States Representative for the 8th district of Indiana; 1983–1995	Succeeded by John Hostettler
Political offices
Preceded by John H. Hooker Jr.	Mayor of Bloomington, Indiana; 1972–1983	Succeeded by Tomilea Allison
