= Lindel Hume =

American politician (born 1942)

Member of the Indiana Senate from the 48th district
- In office 1982–2014
- Preceded by: Kenneth C. Snider
- Succeeded by: Mark Messmer

Member of the Indiana House of Representatives from the 73rd district
- In office 1974–1982
- Preceded by: H. Joel Deckard
- Succeeded by: Dennis Henry Heeke

Personal details
- Born: June 7, 1942 (age 84) Winslow, Indiana
- Party: Democratic
- Spouse: Judith
- Education: Oakland City University
- Profession: Director of Corporate Affairs and Audit

Lindel O. Hume (born June 7, 1942) is a former Democratic member of the Indiana Senate, serving from 1982 until his retirement in 2014. He also previously served eight terms in the Indiana House of Representatives from 1974 through 1982.

== Education ==
Lindel Hume received his education from the following institutions:

- BS, Mathematics and Physics, Oakland City University, 1969
- Electric Technician, Teletronic Technical Institute, 1963
- Attended, MBA studies, University of Evansville

== Political experience ==
Lindel Hume has had the following political experience:

- Senate Minority Whip, Indiana State Senate, 1984, 2008–2014
- Senator, Indiana State Senate, 1982–2014
- Precinct Committeeman, 1968–1976, present
- Representative, Indiana State House of Representatives, 1974–1982
