= H. Joel Deckard =

American politician

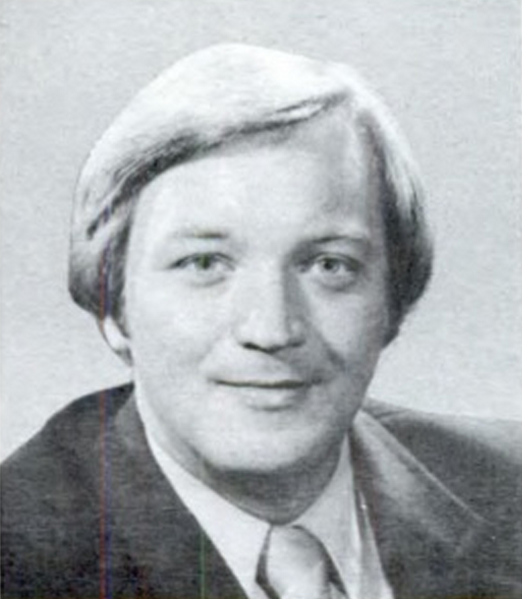

Member of the U.S. House of Representatives from Indiana's 8th district
- In office January 3, 1979 – January 3, 1983
- Preceded by: David L. Cornwell
- Succeeded by: Frank McCloskey

Member of the Indiana House of Representatives from the 73rd district
- In office November 8, 1972 – November 6, 1974
- Succeeded by: Lindel Hume

Member of the Indiana House of Representatives from the 38th district
- In office November 9, 1966 – November 8, 1972
- Succeeded by: Leo A. Voisard

Personal details
- Born: Huey Joel Deckard; March 7, 1942 Vandalia, Illinois
- Died: September 6, 2016 (aged 74) McKinney, Texas
- Party: Republican, Reform Party
- Spouse: Jennie Redman
- Children: one daughter
- Education: University of Evansville
- Profession: television executive

Military service
- Branch/service: National Guard
- Years of service: 1966 to 1982
- Unit: Indiana

Huey Joel Deckard (March 7, 1942 – September 6, 2016) was an American businessman and politician who served two terms as a U.S. representative from Indiana from 1979 to 1983.

== Early life and career ==
Born in Vandalia, Illinois, Deckard attended public schools in Mount Vernon, Indiana. He attended the University of Evansville from 1962 to 1967, and served in the Indiana National Guard from 1966 to 1972.

Deckard was affiliated with broadcasting stations in southern Illinois and Indiana from 1959 to 1972. He was a cable television executive and legislative liaison for the Illinois-Indiana TV Association from 1974 to 1977. Deckard also formed a corporation involved in design and construction of energy-efficient and solar-heated homes and offices.

He served as member of the Indiana House of Representatives from 1966 to 1974.

== Congress ==
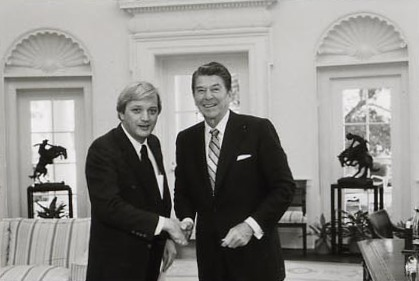
Deckard with President Ronald Reagan in 1981

Deckard was elected as a Republican to the Ninety-sixth and to the Ninety-seventh Congresses (January 3, 1979 – January 3, 1983). He was an unsuccessful candidate for reelection in 1982 to the Ninety-eighth Congress, losing to then-Bloomington mayor Frank McCloskey. Initially favored for reelection to a third term, Deckard was involved in an automobile accident three weeks before the election. He refused to take a blood test and was charged with driving under the influence. McCloskey sought to tie Deckard to President Ronald Reagan at a time of high unemployment in the district. When McCloskey defeated Deckard, Deckard became the sixth incumbent from 1966 to 1982 to lose reelection in the district known as the "Bloody Eighth."

== Later career and death ==
Deckard ultimately moved to Florida, where he became a computer technical specialist for Citibank in Tallahassee. A supporter of Pat Buchanan, he was the Reform Party's nominee for U.S. Senator in 2000. Deckard's 17,338 votes, only 0.30% of the total votes cast, became the subject of statistical analysis by critics of the butterfly ballot in Palm Beach county.

He lived in Little Elm, Texas, in his retirement. He died of an apparent heart attack on September 6, 2016, at a hospital in McKinney, Texas.

U.S. House of Representatives
| Preceded by David L. Cornwell | United States Representative for the 8th district of Indiana; 1979–1983 | Succeeded by Frank McCloskey |
Party political offices
| Preceded by none | Reform Party nominee for United States Senator from Florida (class 1); 2000 (lost) | Succeeded by none |
