= Dwayne Sawyer =

American politician from Indiana

55th Indiana State Auditor
- In office August 19, 2013 – December 15, 2013
- Governor: Mike Pence
- Preceded by: Tim Berry
- Succeeded by: Suzanne Crouch

Personal details
- Born: 1966 (age 59–60)
- Party: Republican
- Spouse: Melissa Sawyer
- Children: 3
- Education: Purdue University (BS)

Dwayne Sawyer (born 1966) is an American politician from the state of Indiana. A member of the Republican Party, Sawyer was the 55th Indiana state auditor. He resigned as state auditor on November 26, 2013, citing "personal and family reasons".

Sawyer was previously a member of the Brownsburg, Indiana Town Council, where he served as council president from 2012 to 2013. On August 15, 2013, Sawyer was appointed by Governor Mike Pence to serve as Indiana state auditor; filling the vacancy created by the departure of Tim Berry, who resigned after he was appointed chair of the Indiana Republican Party. Sawyer was sworn in by Indiana Chief Justice Brent Dickson on August 19, becoming the first African-American Republican to hold statewide office in Indiana.

== Early life and education ==
Sawyer is a 1984 graduate of Peru Senior High School in Peru, New York. He attended Purdue University, graduating in 1989 with a degree in computer technology. He was a member of the Phi Kappa Tau fraternity.

== Career ==
Before entering politics, Sawyer spent his career in the private sector; holding financial management positions for Roche Diagnostics, Dow AgroSciences and Eli Lilly and Company. Since 2010, Sawyer has worked as a Senior Software Engineer for Positron Corporation, a nuclear cardiology technology research and development company.

Sawyer serves as the secretary of Indiana's 4th district Republican Committee and also serves as a member of the Executive Committee of the Hendricks County Republican Party. He currently serves on the Board of Directors of the Indiana Leadership Forum and the Hendricks County Regional Health YMCA. In 2013, Sawyer was also appointed by Governor Mike Pence to serve on the Indiana Commission on the Social Status of Black Males.

=== Brownsburg Town Council ===
Sawyer was elected to the Brownsburg Town Council in December 2008 by the Hendricks County Republican Party precinct committee, after council member Ronna Jessen resigned from serving Brownsburg's 2nd Ward. Sawyer, the first African-American to hold elected office in Hendricks County, was sworn in on January 10, 2009, by Hendricks County Superior Court Judge Robert Freese, being introduced by Indiana Secretary of State Todd Rokita. Sawyer ran unopposed in the May 2011 Republican primary, winning reelection in the November general election. Sawyer became Brownsburg Town Council President in January 2012, resigning in August 2013 to assume the position of State Auditor of Indiana.

As council President, Sawyer helped lead efforts in the controversial annexation of Brownsburg. In a 3-2 council vote, Sawyer voted in favor of allowing the 4,500 acre annexation of the northern borders, doubling the size of the city for future growth and expansion. Sawyer has advocated for a 0.3% raise in local income taxes to support the expansion of mass transit, pushing the Indiana General Assembly to support legislation for individual counties to allow referendums for such an increase to support county highway transportation projects.

=== Indiana state auditor ===
Sawyer was appointed Indiana state auditor by Governor Mike Pence on August 15, 2013. He was later sworn in as the 55th auditor on August 19, 2013. Sawyer's term would only last a little over three months. On November 26, 2013, he submitted a letter of resignation to Governor Pence citing "personal reasons". In a written statement, Sawyer explained his resignation: “Due to family and personal concerns, I have come to the conclusion that it will be in the best interests of my family and the people of Indiana whom I have been honored to serve that I resign from the office of Indiana auditor of state.”

To date, Governor Pence has yet to explain the exact nature of Sawyer's resignation. On December 5, 2013, Indiana Democratic Party Chair John Zody submitted a public records request with Governor Pence's office seeking further information regarding the Governor's vetting process for appointments and the exact reason for Sawyer's resignation.

On December 16, 2013, Republican State Representative Suzanne Crouch was appointed by Governor Mike Pence to replace Sawyer as Indiana State Auditor.

== Personal life ==
Sawyer is married to Melissa Sawyer. They've lived in Brownsburg since 2001 with their three children, who he and his wife home school. Sawyer also enjoys playing the alto saxophone.

Political offices
Preceded by Ronna Jessen	Member of the Brownsburg Town Council from the 2nd Ward; 2009-2013	Succeeded by TBD
Preceded by Mike Rogers	President of the Brownsburg Town Council; 2012-2013	Succeeded by Gary Hood
Preceded by Tim Berry	55th Indiana State Auditor; 2013	Succeeded by Suzanne Crouch
