= Indiana State Comptroller =

U.S. state executive officer

Comptroller of Indiana
- Seal of Indiana

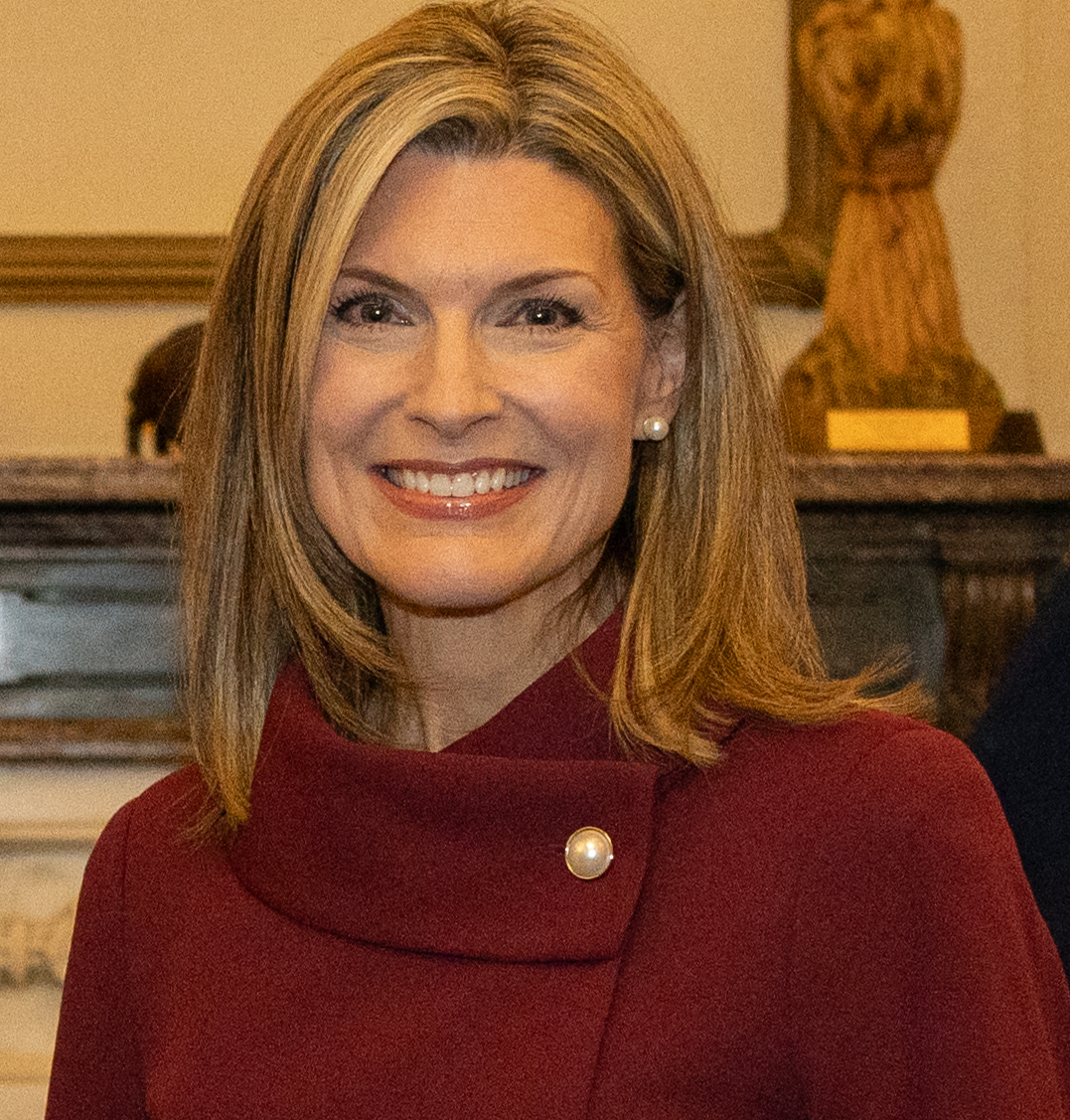
- Incumbent; Elise Nieshalla since December 1, 2023
- Appointer: Indiana electorate
- Term length: 4 years
- Inaugural holder: William H. Lilly; November 16, 1816
- Formation: Indiana Constitution; 1816
- Succession: Fifth
- Salary: $145,876
- Website: http://www.in.gov/auditor

The Indiana State Comptroller (referred to in the state constitution as auditor of state) is a constitutional officer in the executive branch of government of the U.S. state of Indiana. Fifty-seven individuals have occupied the office of auditor of state since statehood. The incumbent is Elise Nieshalla, a Republican. (Note: Nieshalla has held this office since her 2023 appointment by Indiana Governor Eric Holcomb to succeed her predecessor, Tera Klutz, who resigned to take a position in the private sector.)

== Election and term of office ==
The auditor of state is elected to a four-year term of office. The occupant of the office is term limited and cannot serve more than eight years out of any twelve-year period.

== Powers and duties ==
The auditor of state, officially doing business as "the state comptroller" since July 1, 2023, functions as the chief financial officer for the whole of state government. In terms of financial accounting, the auditor of state creates and operates the statewide accounting system, maintains a record of revenues, expenditures and balances by state fund, collects debts owed the state, and prepares various financial reports, including the state of Indiana's annual comprehensive financial report. As it concerns disbursements of public money, the auditor of state examines and settles claims by and against the state, issues warrants on the state treasury in payment of claims approved, authorizes electronic funds transfers, and administers payroll to over 33,000 state employees. The auditor of state is also responsible for supervising county finances and distributing property tax revenue to counties, cities, towns, schools, and other local units of government.

== List of auditors ==
Democratic-Republican Democratic Whig Republican

=== Territorial auditors ===
#	Name	Took office	Left office	Party	Hometown	Notes
1	Peter Jones	September 5, 1805	1810		Knox Co.	
2	William Prince	April 13, 1810	1813	Democratic-Republican	Vincennes, Indiana	
3	General Washington Johnston	January 20, 1813	1813		Vincennes, Indiana	
4	William Prince	February 8, 1813	1813	Democratic-Republican	Vincennes, Indiana	
5	Davis Floyd	June 15, 1813	1814	Democratic-Republican	Corydon, Indiana	

=== State auditors ===
#	Name	Took office	Left office	Party	Hometown	Notes
1	William H. Lilly	November 16, 1816	February 17, 1828	Democratic-Republican	Corydon, Indiana	
2	Benjamin L. Blythe	April 5, 1828	December 4, 1828	Democratic-Republican	Brookville, Indiana	
3	Morris Morris	January 21, 1829	January 24, 1844	Whig	Indianapolis, Indiana	
4	Horatio J. Harris	January 24, 1844	January 25, 1847	Democratic	Delphi, Indiana	
5	Douglass Maguire	January 25, 1847	January 25, 1850	Whig	Indianapolis, Indiana	
6	Erastus W. H. Ellis	January 25, 1850	January 25, 1853	Democratic	Elkhart County, Indiana	
7	John P. Dunn	January 25, 1853	January 25, 1855	Democratic	Dearborn County, Indiana	
8	Hiram E. Talbott	January 25, 1855	January 26, 1857	Republican	Putnam County, Indiana	
9	John W. Dodd	January 26, 1857	January 25, 1861	Democratic	Grant County, Indiana	
10	Albert Lange	January 25, 1861	January 26, 1863	Republican	Terre Haute, Indiana	
11	Joseph Ristine	January 26, 1863	January 25, 1865	Democratic	Fountain County, Indiana	
12	Thomas B. McCarthy	January 25, 1865	January 25, 1869	Republican	Wabash, Indiana	
13	John D. Evans	January 25, 1869	January 25, 1871	Republican	Noblesville, Indiana	
14	John C. Schoemaker	January 25, 1871	January 25, 1873	Democratic	Cannelton, Indiana	
15	James A. Wildman	January 25, 1873	January 25, 1875	Republican	Kokomo, Indiana	
16	Ebenezer Henderson	January 25, 1875	January 25, 1879	Democratic	Martinsville, Indiana	
17	Mahlon D. Manson	January 25, 1879	January 25, 1881	Democratic	Crawfordsville, Indiana	
18	Edward H. Wolfe	January 25, 1881	January 25, 1883	Republican	Rushville, Indiana	
19	James H. Rice	January 25, 1883	January 25, 1887	Democratic	New Albany, Indiana	
20	Bruce Carr	January 25, 1887	January 25, 1891	Republican	Orange County, Indiana	
21	John O. Henderson	January 25, 1891	January 25, 1895	Democratic	Kokomo, Indiana	
22	Americus C. Daily	January 25, 1895	January 25, 1899	Republican	Boone County, Indiana	
23	William H. Hart	January 25, 1899	January 25, 1903	Republican	Frankfort, Indiana	
24	David E. Sherrick	January 25, 1903	September 14, 1905	Republican	Noblesville, Indiana	
25	Warren Bigler	September 14, 1905	November 24, 1906	Republican	Wabash, Indiana	
26	John C. Billheimer	November 24, 1906	November 24, 1910	Republican	Washington, Indiana	
27	William H. O'Brien	November 24, 1910	November 24, 1914	Democratic	Lawrenceburg, Indiana	
28	Dale J. Crittenberger	November 24, 1914	November 24, 1916	Democratic	Anderson, Indiana	
29	Otto L. Klauss	November 24, 1916	November 24, 1920	Republican	Evansville, Indiana	
30	William G. Oliver	November 24, 1920	November 24, 1922	Republican	Franklin, Indiana	
31	Robert Bracken	November 24, 1922	November 24, 1924	Democratic	Frankfort, Indiana	
32	Lewis S. Bowman	December 1, 1924	December 1, 1928	Republican	Richmond, Indiana	
33	Arch N. Bobbitt	December 1, 1928	December 1, 1930	Republican	English, Indiana	
34	Floyd E. Williamson	December 1, 1930	December 1, 1934	Democratic	Indianapolis, Indiana	
35	Laurence F. Sullivan	December 1, 1934	December 1, 1938	Democratic	Princeton, Indiana	
36	Frank G. Thompson	December 1, 1938	December 1, 1940	Democratic	Bluffton, Indiana	
37	Richard T. James	December 1, 1940	December 1, 1944	Republican	Portland, Indiana	
38	Alvan V. Burch	December 1, 1944	December 1, 1948	Republican	Evansville, Indiana	
39	James M. Propst	December 1, 1948	December 1, 1950	Democratic	Terre Haute, Indiana	
40	Frank Millis	December 1, 1950	December 1, 1954	Republican	Campbellsburg, Indiana	
41	Curtis E. Rardin	December 1, 1954	December 1, 1956	Republican	Rensselaer, Indiana	
42	Roy T. Combs	December 1, 1956	December 1, 1958	Republican	Indianapolis, Indiana	
43	Albert A. Steinwedal	December 1, 1958	December 1, 1960	Democratic	Seymour, Indiana	
44	Dorothy Gardner	December 1, 1960	December 1, 1964	Republican	Fort Wayne, Indiana	
45	Mark L. France	December 1, 1964	December 1, 1966	Democratic	Fort Wayne, Indiana	
46	John P. Gallagher	December 1, 1966	December 1, 1968	Republican	Munster, Indiana	
47	Trudy S. Etherton	December 1, 1968	December 1, 1970	Republican	South Bend, Indiana	
48	Mary Aikins Currie	December 1, 1970	December 1, 1978	Democratic	Osgood, Indiana	
49	Charles D. Loos	December 1, 1978	December 1, 1982	Republican	Cicero, Indiana	
50	Otis E. Cox	December 1, 1982	December 1, 1986	Democratic	Anderson, Indiana	
51	Ann G. DeVore	December 1, 1986	December 1, 1994	Republican	Indianapolis, Indiana	
52	Morris Wooden	December 1, 1994	December 1, 1998	Republican	Indianapolis, Indiana	
53	Connie Kay Nass	December 1, 1998	December 1, 2006	Republican	Huntingburg, Indiana	
54	Tim Berry	December 1, 2006	August 13, 2013	Republican	Fort Wayne, Indiana	
55	Dwayne Sawyer	August 19, 2013	December 15, 2013	Republican	Brownsburg, Indiana	
56	Suzanne Crouch	January 2, 2014	January 9, 2017	Republican	Evansville, Indiana	
57	Tera Klutz	January 9, 2017	November 30, 2023	Republican	Fort Wayne, Indiana	
58	Elise Nieshalla	December 1, 2023	present	Republican	Zionsville, Indiana	

== See also ==
- Government of Indiana

== Sources ==
- Funk, Arville L (1983) [1969]. A Sketchbook of Indiana History. Rochester, Indiana: Christian Book Press. pp. 209–210.
