= Eric Holcomb =

Governor of Indiana from 2017 to 2025

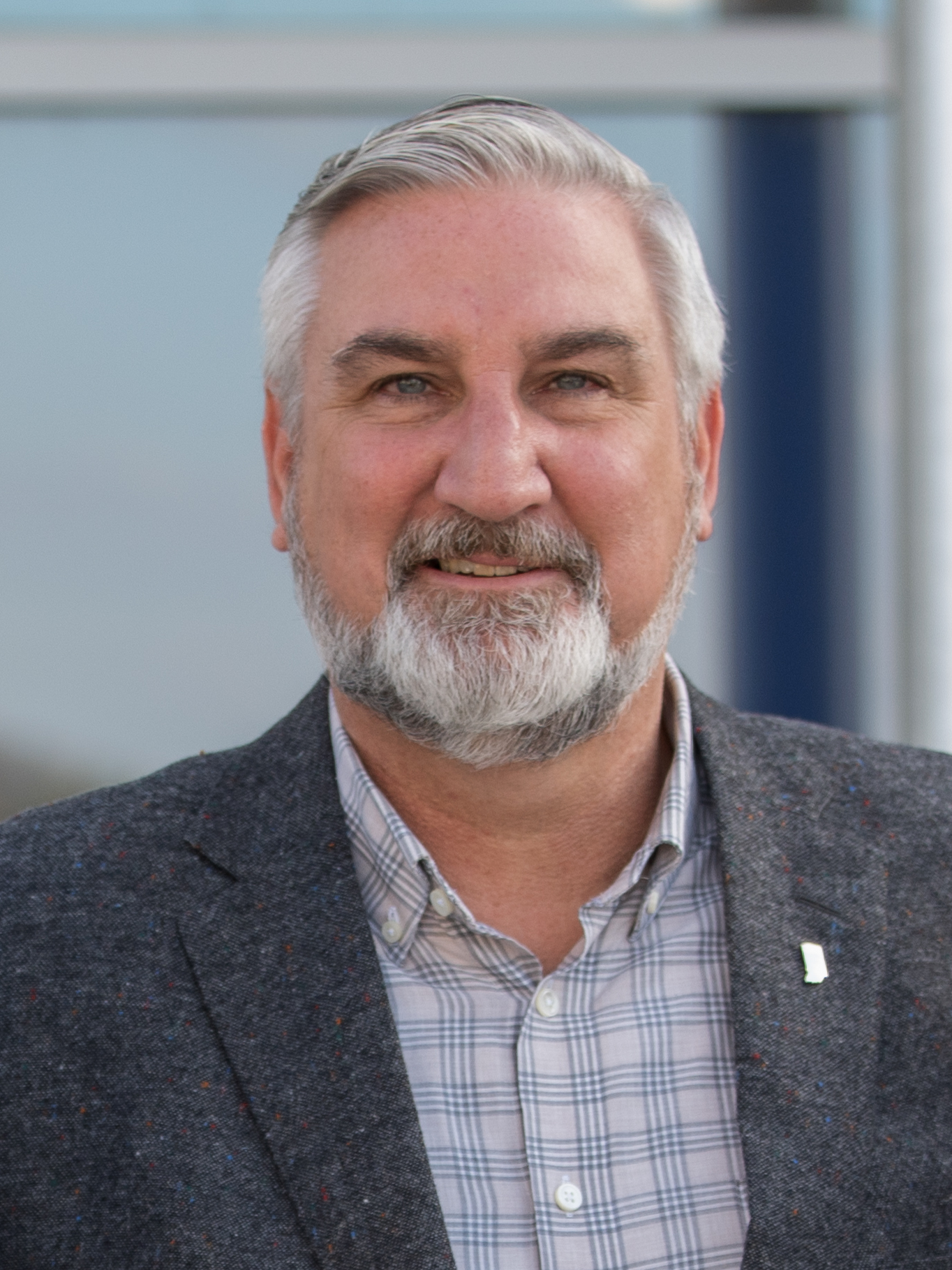
- Holcomb in 2023

51st Governor of Indiana
- In office January 9, 2017 – January 13, 2025
- Lieutenant: Suzanne Crouch
- Preceded by: Mike Pence
- Succeeded by: Mike Braun

51st Lieutenant Governor of Indiana
- In office March 3, 2016 – January 9, 2017
- Governor: Mike Pence
- Preceded by: Sue Ellspermann
- Succeeded by: Suzanne Crouch

Chair of the Indiana Republican Party
- In office January 3, 2011 – July 22, 2013
- Preceded by: J. Murray Clark
- Succeeded by: Tim Berry

Personal details
- Born: Eric Joseph Holcomb; May 2, 1968 (age 58) Indianapolis, Indiana, U.S.
- Party: Republican
- Spouse: Janet Holcomb (m. 2000)
- Education: Hanover College (BA)

Military service
- Allegiance: United States
- Branch/service: United States Navy
- Years of service: 1990–1996

Eric Joseph Holcomb (/ˈhoʊlkəm/ HOHL-kəm; born May 2, 1968) is an American politician who served as the 51st governor of Indiana, from 2017 to 2025. A member of the Republican Party, he served from 2016 to 2017 as the 51st lieutenant governor of Indiana under Governor Mike Pence, who left the governorship in 2017 to become the vice president of the United States. Holcomb was nominated to fill the remainder of Lieutenant Governor Sue Ellspermann's term after she resigned on March 2, 2016, to become president of Ivy Tech Community College. He won the 2016 election for governor of Indiana over Democratic nominee John R. Gregg, and was reelected in 2020 over Democratic nominee Woody Myers and Libertarian nominee Donald Rainwater.

== Early life and education ==
Holcomb was born in Indianapolis, Indiana. He graduated from Pike High School in Indianapolis, and in 1990 from Hanover College in Hanover, Indiana. At Hanover, he joined the fraternity Phi Gamma Delta and served as chapter president. Holcomb served in the United States Navy for six years, first at Naval Station Great Lakes and later in Florida and Portugal. He received an honorary Doctor of Humane Letters degree from Trine University on October 5, 2018, an honorary Doctor of Laws from Anderson University on May 11, 2019, and an honorary Doctor of Humane Letters degree from Rose-Hulman on May 30, 2020.

== Early political career ==
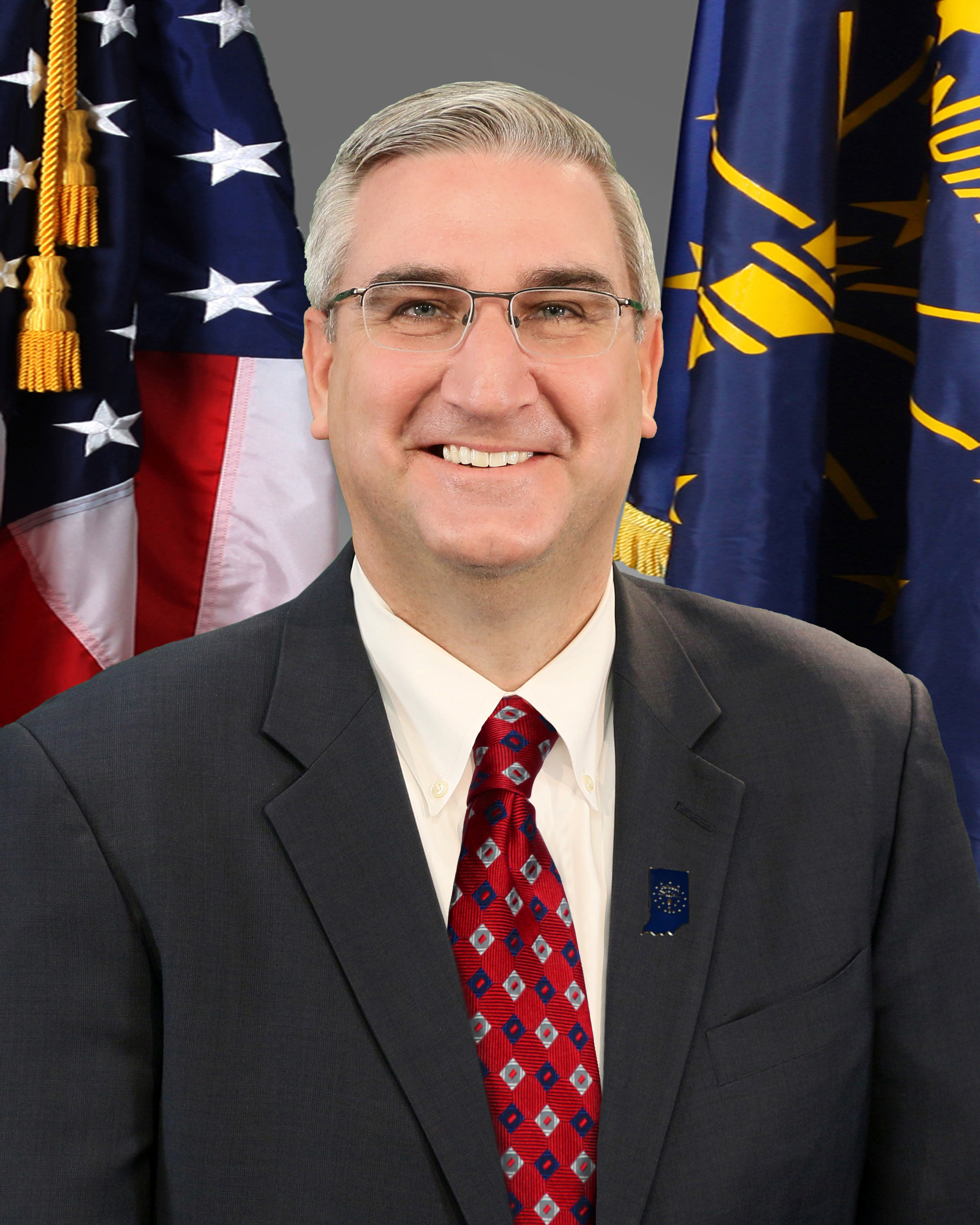
Holcomb during his tenure as lieutenant governor, 2016

Holcomb began working for John Hostettler, a member of the United States House of Representatives, in 1997. In 2000, Holcomb ran for the Indiana House of Representatives against John Frenz, but was defeated.

From 2003 to 2011, Holcomb served as an advisor to Indiana governor Mitch Daniels, eventually rising to the role of Deputy Chief of Staff, and served as campaign manager for Daniels's 2008 gubernatorial campaign. He became Chairman of the Indiana Republican Party in 2011. In 2013, he resigned to become the state chief of staff to U.S. Senator Dan Coats. In March 2015 Coats announced that he would not run for reelection to the Senate in the 2016 election, and Holcomb announced his intention to run. In February 2016, Holcomb withdrew from the Senate race.

After Lieutenant Governor Sue Ellspermann announced her resignation, Governor Mike Pence chose Holcomb to succeed her and to be his running mate in the 2016 gubernatorial election. Holcomb was sworn in as lieutenant governor on March 3, 2016.

== Governor of Indiana (2017–2025) ==
=== Elections ===
==== 2016 ====
Results of the 2016 Indiana gubernatorial election; Holcomb won the counties in red.

Governor Mike Pence was running for reelection with Holcomb as his running mate in the spring and summer of 2016. By late June, rumors that Pence would be the Republican Party's nominee for vice president under presumptive presidential nominee Donald Trump began to gain traction. In early July, Trump selected Pence as his running mate. Pence then withdrew from Indiana's gubernatorial election and Holcomb withdrew as the nominee for lieutenant governor. Holcomb decided to pursue the nomination for governor and was selected on the second ballot by the Indiana State Republican Central Committee, defeating Rep. Susan Brooks, Rep. Todd Rokita, and State Senator Jim Tomes.

Holcomb chose Indiana State Auditor Suzanne Crouch as his running mate. They faced 2012 Democratic nominee and former Indiana House Speaker John R. Gregg and his running mate, State Representative Christina Hale. After an unprecedented 106-day campaign, Holcomb defeated Gregg, 51.4% to 45.4%. He ran slightly behind the Trump-Pence ticket, which carried Indiana with 56 percent of the vote.

==== 2020 ====
Holcomb was reelected governor in 2020, defeating former state health commissioner Woody Myers with 57% of the vote. He received the most votes for governor in Indiana history.

=== First term ===
After winning the election, Holcomb announced his agenda for the upcoming Indiana General Assembly legislative session. What Holcomb calls his “Next Level Agenda” is based on five “pillars”: strengthening and diversifying Indiana's economy, strengthening Indiana's infrastructure, strengthening education and workforce training, strengthening public health and attacking addiction and providing great government service at an exceptional value to taxpayers. He has said that civility is the foundation on which the other pillars are based.

Holcomb's first act as governor was creating the office of drug prevention, treatment and enforcement and tasking that office with tackling the opioid crisis and other addiction issues in Indiana. Additionally, early in his first term, Holcomb pardoned Keith Cooper, who served eight years in prison after being wrongfully convicted of an armed robbery; declared a disaster emergency at the East Chicago Superfund Site; and ended contract discussions between the Indiana Finance Authority and Agile Networks to manage Indiana's communications infrastructure, including cell towers.

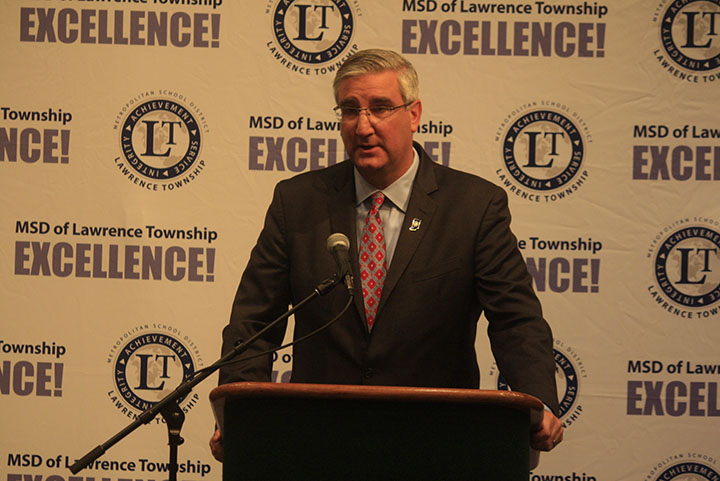
Holcomb at a gubernatorial debate

In April 2017, the Indiana legislature approved Holcomb's request for higher fuel taxes and BMV registration fees to fund infrastructure spending, primarily on road maintenance and construction. The law went into effect on July 1, 2017, and is projected to raise on average $1.2 billion per year through 2024.

In the first quarter of 2019, the National Journal reported that Holcomb's reelection faced serious challenges. It ranked him number 10 on its endangered list, writing, "Holcomb is facing potential match-ups with former state health commissioner Woody Myers and state Senator Eddie Melton." By the end of the second quarter, his approval rating had risen to 50%.

In November 2019, the Center for Investigative Reporting reported that Holcomb had personally pressured an Indiana OSHA investigator to drop a worker fatality case against Amazon so that Indianapolis could have a better chance at being the home of Amazon's HQ2 (a major new office). His office denied the allegations, saying that he had not attended the meeting with the OSHA commissioner and investigator. Holcomb also said the accusations against him would pose a threat to Indiana's "positive business climate" and demanded they be retracted. Regardless of whether Holcomb was directly involved, OSHA eventually dropped the citations against Amazon's fulfillment center and the case was reclassified as one of "employee misconduct" rather than a shortfall in training and safety procedures.

In July 2020, Attorney General Curtis Hill accused Holcomb of overstepping his authority by issuing a statewide face mask mandate with criminal penalties. Hill said that only the legislature has the power under the Indiana constitution to create laws. Holcomb vetoed the laws passed in the special session, and the legislature overrode his vetoes. But on June 2, 2022, the Indiana Supreme Court sided with Holcomb. Citing the state constitution, the court found it was the legislature, not Holcomb, that had overstepped its authority. Chief Justice Loretta Rush wrote in the unanimous opinion, "Simply put, absent a constitutional amendment ... the General Assembly cannot do what HEA-1123 permits, ... our Constitution authorizes only the Governor to call a special session, the General Assembly can set additional sessions—but only by fixing their length and frequency in a law passed during a legislative session and presented to the Governor."

In November 2020, Holcomb announced that he would be appointing Karrah Herring, J.D. as the chief equity, inclusion and opportunity officer of the state of Indiana for his second term in a press release. He stated that his purpose for appointing Herring was to "better build diversity and foster an inclusive environment within state government and the services we provide so every Hoosier can take full advantage of their gifts and potential." She served in his cabinet until the end of his second term in January 2025.

=== Second term ===
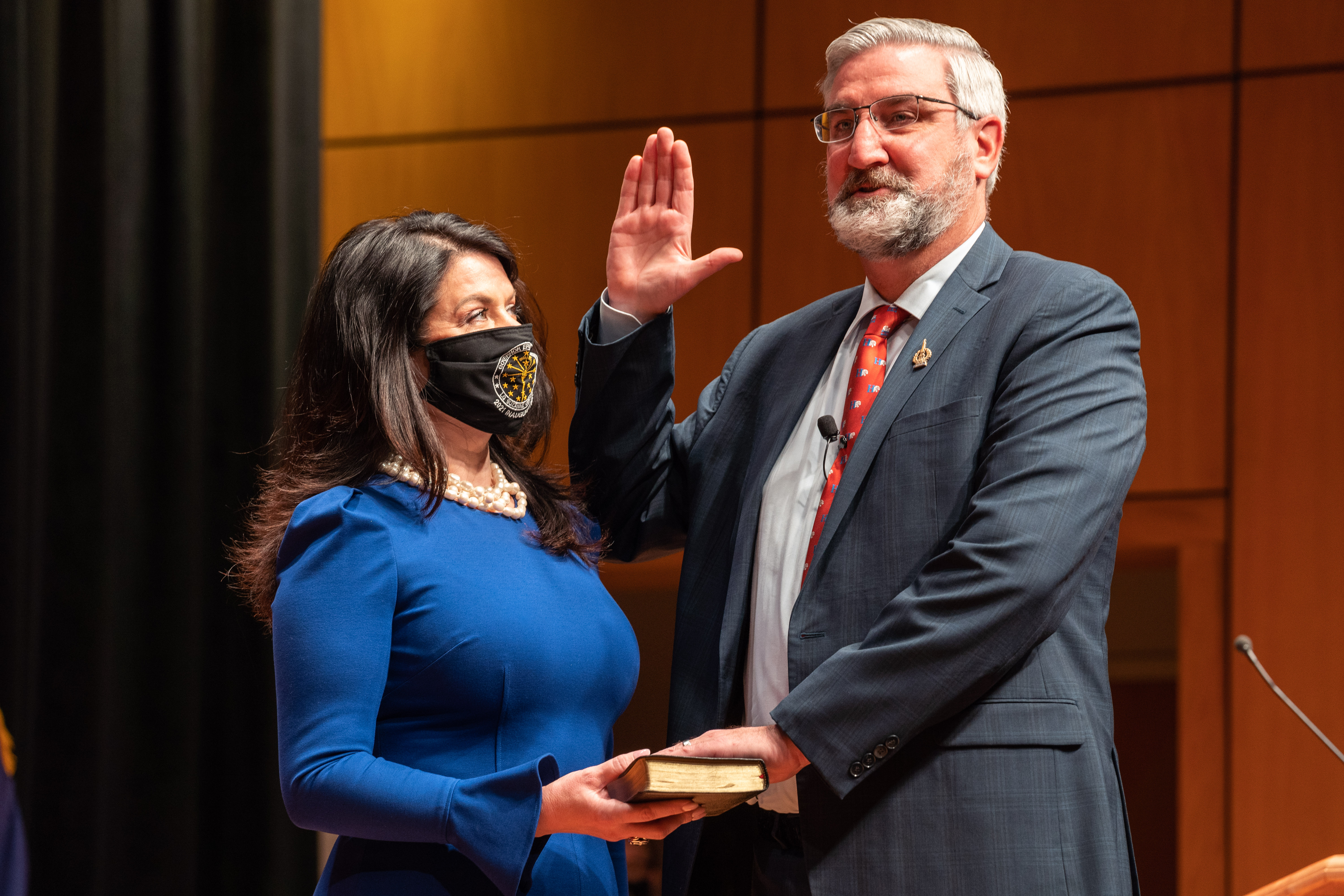
Holcomb at his second inauguration

Holcomb was inaugurated to a second term on January 11, 2021.

In March 2022, Holcomb vetoed H.E.A. 1041, a bill passed by the Indiana General Assembly that would prohibit transgender women from participating in state-sanctioned girls' sports. He cited the bill's low probability of surviving judicial scrutiny and the lack of pressing concern as his reasons for vetoing it. On May 24, the General Assembly overrode Holcomb's veto, passing the bill into law. In the spring of 2023, Holcomb signed several LGBTQ+-related bills into law, including one that bans gender-affirming care for transgender minors, one that requires that parents be immediately notified if a transgender student comes out to a teacher and prohibits discussions of "human sexuality" up to grade 3, and one that bans gender-affirming surgery for inmates in Indiana Department of Corrections facilities.

Holcomb called a special session shortly before the Supreme Court of the United States overturned Roe v. Wade in order to address tax rebates amid the early 2020s inflation surge. After Roe was overturned, the Indiana General Assembly passed a near-total ban on abortion procedures, allowing exceptions only in the case of rape up to 10 weeks into pregnancy and threat to the mother's life. Holcomb signed the bill, S.B. 1, into law. The ban on abortion procedures was blocked in court shortly after going into effect in September 2022. The Indiana Supreme Court ultimately allowed the ban to take effect in a June 30, 2023, ruling.

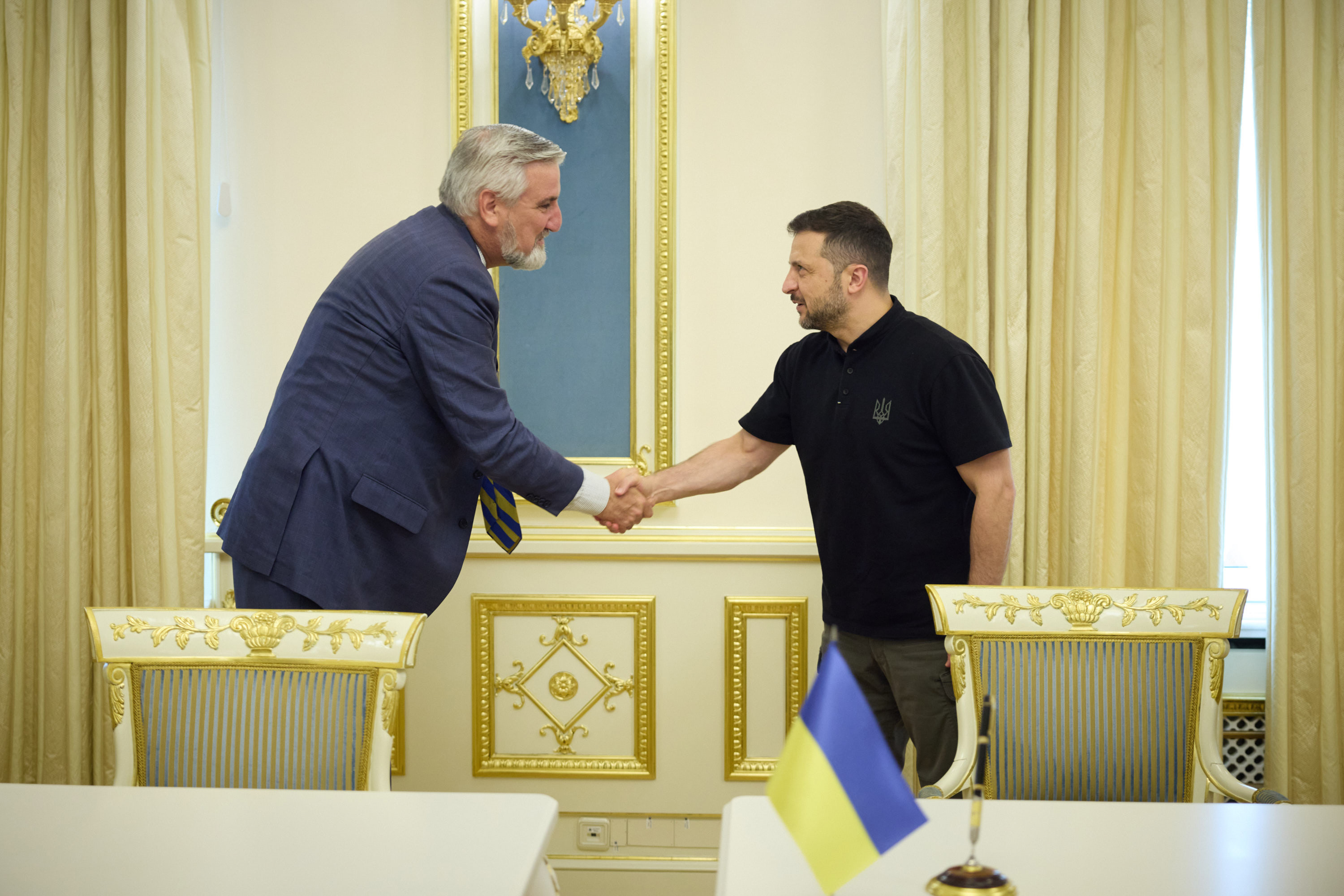
Holcomb with President Zelenskyy

In August 2022, Holcomb led a trade delegation to Taiwan in an effort to strengthen economic ties between Taiwan and Indiana. The delegation also visited South Korea. The visit came after several high-profile visits by U.S. officials to Taiwan, leading to increased tension between the U.S. and the People's Republic of China. In September 2024, Holcomb visited Ukraine to sign an academic, agricultural, and cultural partnership with the country. He is the first U.S. governor to visit Ukraine since the Russian invasion.

In 2024, Holcomb announced plans to resume executions. On December 18, 2024, convicted mass murderer Joseph Corcoran became the first death row inmate to be executed in Indiana since 2009.

== Personal life ==
Holcomb's wife, Janet, runs a family business in Madison County, Indiana. They have no children, and owned a miniature schnauzer, Henry Holcomb, who was known as the "First Dog of Indiana".

== Electoral history ==
2016 Indiana gubernatorial election
Party	Candidate	Votes	%	±%
Republican	Eric Holcomb	1,397,396	51.38%	+1.89%
Democratic	John R. Gregg	1,235,503	45.42%	−1.14%
Libertarian	Rex Bell	87,025	3.20%	−0.75%
Write-in		44	0.00%	0.00%
Total votes		2,719,968	100.00%	N/A
Republican hold				

2020 Indiana gubernatorial election
Party	Candidate	Votes	%	±%
Republican	Eric Holcomb (incumbent)	1,706,739	56.51%	+5.13%
Democratic	Woody Myers	968,106	32.05%	−13.37%
Libertarian	Donald Rainwater	345,569	11.44%	+8.24%
Total votes		3,020,414	100.00%	
Republican hold				

Party political offices
Preceded by Murray Clark	Chair of the Indiana Republican Party; 2011–2013	Succeeded by Tim Berry
Preceded by Sue Ellspermann	Republican nominee for Lieutenant Governor of Indiana; Withdrew; 2016	Succeeded by Suzanne Crouch
Preceded by Mike Pence; Withdrew	Republican nominee for Governor of Indiana; 2016, 2020	Succeeded by Mike Braun
Political offices
Preceded by Sue Ellspermann	Lieutenant Governor of Indiana; 2016–2017	Succeeded by Suzanne Crouch
Preceded by Mike Pence	Governor of Indiana; 2017–2025	Succeeded by Mike Braun
U.S. order of precedence (ceremonial)
Preceded by Mitch Daniels as Former Governor	Order of precedence of the United States; Within Indiana	Succeeded by Jack Markell as Former Governor
Preceded by Mitch Daniels as Former Governor	Order of precedence of the United States; Outside Indiana	Succeeded by Ray Mabus as Former Governor
