= Political party strength in Indiana =

Politics in the US state of Indiana

The following table indicates the party of elected officials in the U.S. state of Indiana:

- Governor
- Lieutenant Governor
- Attorney General
- Secretary of State
- Treasurer
- Auditor
- Superintendent of Public Instruction (before 2021)

The table also indicates the historical party composition in the:

- State Senate
- State House
- State delegation to the U.S. Senate
- State delegation to the U.S. House of Representatives

For years in which a presidential election was held, the table indicates which party's nominees received the state's electoral votes.

== 1816–1851 ==
Year	Executive offices					General Assembly		United States Congress			Electoral votes
Year	Governor	Lt. Governor	Secretary of State	Treasurer	Auditor	State Senate	State House	U.S. Senator (Class I)	U.S. Senator (Class III)	U.S. House	Electoral votes
1816	Jonathan Jennings (DR)	Christopher Harrison (DR)	Robert A. New (DR)	Daniel Crosby Lane (DR)	William H. Lilly (DR)	DR maj.	DR maj.	James Noble (DR)	Waller Taylor (DR)	William; Hendricks (DR)	Monroe/ Tompkins (DR) ✓
1817	Jonathan Jennings (DR)	Christopher Harrison (DR)	Robert A. New (DR)	Daniel Crosby Lane (DR)	William H. Lilly (DR)	DR maj.	DR maj.	James Noble (DR)	Waller Taylor (DR)	William; Hendricks (DR)	Monroe/ Tompkins (DR) ✓
1818	Jonathan Jennings (DR)	Christopher Harrison (DR)	Robert A. New (DR)	Daniel Crosby Lane (DR)	William H. Lilly (DR)	DR maj.	DR maj.	James Noble (DR)	Waller Taylor (DR)	William; Hendricks (DR)	Monroe/ Tompkins (DR) ✓
1819	Jonathan Jennings (DR)	James Beggs (DR)	Robert A. New (DR)	Daniel Crosby Lane (DR)	William H. Lilly (DR)	DR maj.	DR maj.	James Noble (DR)	Waller Taylor (DR)	William; Hendricks (DR)	Monroe/ Tompkins (DR) ✓
1820	Jonathan Jennings (DR)	Ratliff Boon (DR)	Robert A. New (DR)	Daniel Crosby Lane (DR)	William H. Lilly (DR)	DR maj.	DR maj.	James Noble (DR)	Waller Taylor (DR)	William; Hendricks (DR)	Monroe/ Tompkins (DR) ✓
1821	Jonathan Jennings (DR)	Ratliff Boon (DR)	Robert A. New (DR)	Daniel Crosby Lane (DR)	William H. Lilly (DR)	DR maj.	DR maj.	James Noble (DR)	Waller Taylor (DR)	Jonathan; Jennings (DR)	Monroe/ Tompkins (DR) ✓
1822	Ratliff Boon (DR)	Ratliff Boon (DR)	Robert A. New (DR)	Daniel Crosby Lane (DR)	William H. Lilly (DR)	DR maj.	DR maj.	James Noble (DR)	Waller Taylor (DR)	Jonathan; Jennings (DR)	Monroe/ Tompkins (DR) ✓
1823	William Hendricks (DR)	Ratliff Boon (DR)	Robert A. New (DR)	Samuel Merrill (W)	William H. Lilly (DR)	DR maj.	DR maj.	James Noble (DR)	Waller Taylor (DR)	3DR	Monroe/ Tompkins (DR) ✓
1824	William Hendricks (DR)	Ratliff Boon (DR)	Robert A. New (DR)	Samuel Merrill (W)	William H. Lilly (DR)	DR maj.	DR maj.	James Noble (DR)	Waller Taylor (DR)	3DR	Jackson ✗ / Calhoun ✓ (DR)
1825	James B. Ray (I)	John H. Thompson (D)	William W. Wick (D)	Samuel Merrill (W)	William H. Lilly (DR)	NR maj.	NR maj.	James Noble (NR)	William Hendricks (NR)	2NR, 1J	Jackson ✗ / Calhoun ✓ (DR)
1826	James B. Ray (I)	John H. Thompson (D)	William W. Wick (D)	Samuel Merrill (W)	Benjamin I. Blyth (DR)	NR maj.	NR maj.	James Noble (NR)	William Hendricks (NR)	2NR, 1J	Jackson ✗ / Calhoun ✓ (DR)
1827	James B. Ray (I)	John H. Thompson (D)	William W. Wick (D)	Samuel Merrill (W)	Benjamin I. Blyth (DR)	NR maj.	NR maj.	James Noble (NR)	William Hendricks (NR)	3NR	Jackson ✗ / Calhoun ✓ (DR)
1828	James B. Ray (I)	John H. Thompson (D)	William W. Wick (D)	Samuel Merrill (W)	Benjamin I. Blyth (DR)	17NR, 4J	38NR, 15J, 4?	James Noble (NR)	William Hendricks (NR)	3NR	Jackson/ Calhoun (D) ✓
1829	James B. Ray (I)	Milton Stapp (I)	James Morrison (D)	Samuel Merrill (W)	Morris Morris (W)	19NR, 2J	27NR, 22J, 9?	James Noble (NR)	William Hendricks (NR)	2NR, 1J	Jackson/ Calhoun (D) ✓
1830	James B. Ray (I)	Milton Stapp (I)	James Morrison (D)	Samuel Merrill (W)	Morris Morris (W)	18NR, 3D, 1?	28D, 23NR, 11?	James Noble (NR)	William Hendricks (NR)	2NR, 1J	Jackson/ Calhoun (D) ✓
1831	James B. Ray (I)	Milton Stapp (I)	James Morrison (D)	Samuel Merrill (W)	Morris Morris (W)	17NR, 6D	30NR, 22D, 9?	Robert Hanna (NR)	William Hendricks (NR)	3J	Jackson/ Calhoun (D) ✓
1832	Noah Noble (W)	David Wallace (W)	James Morrison (D)	Samuel Merrill (W)	Morris Morris (W)	21NR, 9D	37NR, 37D, 1?	John Tipton (J)	William Hendricks (NR)	3J	Jackson/ Van Buren (D) ✓
1833	Noah Noble (W)	David Wallace (W)	William Sheets (W)	Samuel Merrill (W)	Morris Morris (W)	20W, 9D, 1?	42D, 33W	John Tipton (J)	William Hendricks (NR)	5J, 1D, 1NR	Jackson/ Van Buren (D) ✓
1834	Noah Noble (W)	David Wallace (W)	William Sheets (W)	Nathan B. Palmer (D)	Morris Morris (W)	15W, 13D, 2?	39D, 33W, 3?	John Tipton (J)	William Hendricks (NR)	5J, 1D, 1NR	Jackson/ Van Buren (D) ✓
1835	Noah Noble (W)	David Wallace (W)	William Sheets (W)	Nathan B. Palmer (D)	Morris Morris (W)	16W, 14D, 1?	46W, 30D	John Tipton (J)	William Hendricks (NR)	5J, 1D, 1NR	Jackson/ Van Buren (D) ✓
1836	Noah Noble (W)	David Wallace (W)	William Sheets (W)	Nathan B. Palmer (D)	Morris Morris (W)	16W, 14D, 1?	44W, 37D	John Tipton (J)	William Hendricks (NR)	5J, 1D, 1NR	Harrison/ Granger (W) ✗
1837	Noah Noble (W)	David Wallace (W)	William J. Brown (D)	Nathan B. Palmer (D)	Morris Morris (W)	27W, 20D	54W, 46D	John Tipton (D)	Oliver H. Smith (W)	6W, 1D	Harrison/ Granger (W) ✗
1838	David Wallace (W)	David Hillis (W)	William J. Brown (D)	Nathan B. Palmer (D)	Morris Morris (W)	25W, 22D	56W, 44D	John Tipton (D)	Oliver H. Smith (W)	6W, 1D	Harrison/ Granger (W) ✗
1839	David Wallace (W)	David Hillis (W)	William J. Brown (D)	Nathan B. Palmer (D)	Morris Morris (W)	27W, 20D	57W, 43D	Albert Smith White (W)	Oliver H. Smith (W)	5D, 2W	Harrison/ Granger (W) ✗
1840	David Wallace (W)	David Hillis (W)	William J. Brown (D)	Nathan B. Palmer (D)	Morris Morris (W)	25D, 22W	61D, 39W	Albert Smith White (W)	Oliver H. Smith (W)	5D, 2W	Harrison/ Tyler (W) ✓
1841	Samuel Bigger (W)	Samuel Hall (W)	William Sheets (W)	George Hedford Dunn (W)	Morris Morris (W)	33W, 14D	78W, 22D	Albert Smith White (W)	Oliver H. Smith (W)	6W, 1D	Harrison/ Tyler (W) ✓
1842	Samuel Bigger (W)	Samuel Hall (W)	William Sheets (W)	George Hedford Dunn (W)	Morris Morris (W)	28W, 22D	53D, 47W	Albert Smith White (W)	Oliver H. Smith (W)	6W, 1D	Harrison/ Tyler (W) ✓
1843	Samuel Bigger (W)	Samuel Hall (W)	William Sheets (W)	George Hedford Dunn (W)	Morris Morris (W)	31W, 19D	54D, 46W	Albert Smith White (W)	Edward A. Hannegan (D)	8D, 2W	Harrison/ Tyler (W) ✓
1844	James Whitcomb (D)	Jesse D. Bright (D)	William Sheets (W)	Royal Mayhew (D)	Horatio J. Harris (D)	26D, 24W	55D, 45W	Albert Smith White (W)	Edward A. Hannegan (D)	8D, 2W	Polk/ Dallas (D) ✓
1845	James Whitcomb (D)	Jesse D. Bright (D)	John H. Thompson (W)	Royal Mayhew (D)	Horatio J. Harris (D)	25D, 25W (Note: Lt. Gov. Jesse D. Bright provided the tie-breaking vote to help the Democrats organize the chamber.)	54W, 45D, 1?	Jesse D. Bright (D)	Edward A. Hannegan (D)	8D, 2W	Polk/ Dallas (D) ✓
1846	James Whitcomb (D)	Godlove S. Orth (W)	John H. Thompson (W)	Royal Mayhew (D)	Horatio J. Harris (D)	25W, 25D (Note: Lt. Gov. Godlove Stein Orth provided the tie-breaking vote to help the Whigs organize the chamber.)	56D, 44W	Jesse D. Bright (D)	Edward A. Hannegan (D)	8D, 2W	Polk/ Dallas (D) ✓
1847	James Whitcomb (D)	Paris C. Dunning (D)	John H. Thompson (W)	Samuel Hannah (W)	Douglass Maguire (W)	26D, 24W	53W, 47D	Jesse D. Bright (D)	Edward A. Hannegan (D)	6D, 4W	Polk/ Dallas (D) ✓
1848	James Whitcomb (D)	Paris C. Dunning (D)	John H. Thompson (W)	Samuel Hannah (W)	Douglass Maguire (W)	25D, 25W (Note: Lt. Gov. Paris Dunning provided the tie-breaking vote to help the Democrats organize the chamber.)	51W, 49D	Jesse D. Bright (D)	Edward A. Hannegan (D)	6D, 4W	Cass/ Butler (D) ✗
1849	Paris C. Dunning (D)	James G. Read (D)	Charles H. Test (W)	Samuel Hannah (W)	Douglass Maguire (W)	29D, 21W	59D, 41W	Jesse D. Bright (D)	James Whitcomb (D)	8D, 1W, 1FS	Cass/ Butler (D) ✗
1850	Joseph A. Wright (D)	James H. Lane (D)	Charles H. Test (W)	James P. Drake (D)	Erastus W. H. Ellis (D)	33D, 17W	65D, 35W	Jesse D. Bright (D)	James Whitcomb (D)	8D, 1W, 1FS	Cass/ Butler (D) ✗
1851	Joseph A. Wright (D)	James H. Lane (D)	Charles H. Test (W)	James P. Drake (D)	Erastus W. H. Ellis (D)	39D, 10W, 1FS	61D, 38W, 1FS	Jesse D. Bright (D)	James Whitcomb (D)	8D, 2W	Cass/ Butler (D) ✗

== 1852–2024 ==
Year	Executive offices							General Assembly		United States Congress			Electoral votes
Year	Governor	Lt. Governor	Attorney General	Secretary of State	Treasurer	Auditor	Supt. of Pub. Inst.	State Senate	State House	U.S. Senator (Class I)	U.S. Senator (Class III)	U.S. House	Electoral votes
1852	Joseph A. Wright (D)	James H. Lane (D)	no such office	Nehemiah Hayden (D)	James P. Drake (D)	Erastus W. H. Ellis (D)	William C. Larrabee (D)	34D, 16W	66D, 34W	Jesse D. Bright (D)	James Whitcomb (D)	8D, 2W	Pierce/ King (D) ✓
1853	Joseph A. Wright (D)	Ashbel P. Willard (D)	no such office	Nehemiah Hayden (D)	Elijah Newland (D)	John P. Dunn (D)	William C. Larrabee (D)	34D, 16W	66D, 34W	Jesse D. Bright (D)	Charles W. Cathcart (D)	10D, 1W	Pierce/ King (D) ✓
1854	Joseph A. Wright (D)	Ashbel P. Willard (D)	no such office	Nehemiah Hayden (D)	Elijah Newland (D)	John P. Dunn (D)	Caleb Mills (P)	34D, 16W	66D, 34W	Jesse D. Bright (D)	John Pettit (D)	10D, 1W	Pierce/ King (D) ✓
1855	Joseph A. Wright (D)	Ashbel P. Willard (D)	James Morrison (D)	Erasmus B. Collins (P)	William R. Nofsinger (P)	Hiram E. Talbott (P)	Caleb Mills (P)	26D, 24P	57P, 43D	Jesse D. Bright (D)	John Pettit (D)	9P, 2D	Pierce/ King (D) ✓
1856	Joseph A. Wright (D)	Ashbel P. Willard (D)	James Morrison (D)	Erasmus B. Collins (P)	William R. Nofsinger (P)	Hiram E. Talbott (P)	Caleb Mills (P)	26D, 24P	57P, 43D	Jesse D. Bright (D)	John Pettit (D)	9P, 2D	Buchanan/ Breckinridge (D) ✓
1857	Ashbel P. Willard (D)	Abram A. Hammond (D)	Joseph E. McDonald (D)	Daniel McClure (D)	Aquilla Jones (D)	John W. Dodd (D)	William C. Larrabee (D)	26R, 23D, 1KN	63D, 35R, 2KN	Jesse D. Bright (D)	Graham N. Fitch (D)	6D, 5R	Buchanan/ Breckinridge (D) ✓
1858	Ashbel P. Willard (D)	Abram A. Hammond (D)	Joseph E. McDonald (D)	Daniel McClure (D)	Aquilla Jones (D)	John W. Dodd (D)	William C. Larrabee (D)	26R, 23D, 1KN	63D, 35R, 2KN	Jesse D. Bright (D)	Graham N. Fitch (D)	6D, 5R	Buchanan/ Breckinridge (D) ✓
1858	Ashbel P. Willard (D)	Abram A. Hammond (D)	Joseph E. McDonald (D)	Cyrus L. Dunham (D)	Aquilla Jones (D)	John W. Dodd (D)	William C. Larrabee (D)	26R, 23D, 1KN	63D, 35R, 2KN	Jesse D. Bright (D)	Graham N. Fitch (D)	6D, 5R	Buchanan/ Breckinridge (D) ✓
1859	Ashbel P. Willard (D)	Abram A. Hammond (D)	Joseph E. McDonald (D)	Cyrus L. Dunham (D)	Nathaniel F. Cunningham (D)	John W. Dodd (D)	Samuel L. Rugg (D)	25D, 24R, 1KN (Note: With a split Senate, John Robert Cravens, a Republican, was elected as Senate President Pro Tempore, giving Republicans functional control.)	52D, 44R, 3KN, 1?	Jesse D. Bright (D)	Graham N. Fitch (D)	7R, 4D	Buchanan/ Breckinridge (D) ✓
1860	Abram A. Hammond (D)	Abram A. Hammond (D)	James G. Jones (R)	Cyrus L. Dunham (D)	Nathaniel F. Cunningham (D)	John W. Dodd (D)	Samuel L. Rugg (D)	25D, 24R, 1KN	52D, 44R, 3KN, 1?	Jesse D. Bright (D)	Graham N. Fitch (D)	7R, 4D	Lincoln/ Hamlin (R) ✓
1861	Henry S. Lane (R)	Oliver P. Morton (R)	John Palmer Usher (R)	William A. Peelle (R)	Jonathan S. Harvey (R)	Albert Lange (R)	Miles J. Fletcher (R)	28R, 22D	62R, 38D	Jesse D. Bright (D)	Henry S. Lane (R)	7R, 4D	Lincoln/ Hamlin (R) ✓
1862	Oliver P. Morton (R)	John R. Cravens (R)	John F. Kibbey (R)	William A. Peelle (R)	Jonathan S. Harvey (R)	Albert Lange (R)	Samuel K. Hoshour (R)	28R, 22D	62R, 38D	Joseph A. Wright (U)	Henry S. Lane (R)	7R, 4D	Lincoln/ Hamlin (R) ✓
1863	Oliver P. Morton (R)	Paris C. Dunning (D)	Oscar B. Hord (D)	James S. Athon (D)	Matthew L. Brett (D)	Joseph Ristine (D)	Samuel L. Rugg (D)	27D, 21R, 2I	60D, 40R	David Turpie (D)	Henry S. Lane (R)	7D, 4R	Lincoln/ Hamlin (R) ✓
1864	Oliver P. Morton (R)	Paris C. Dunning (D)	Oscar B. Hord (D)	James S. Athon (D)	Matthew L. Brett (D)	Joseph Ristine (D)	Samuel L. Rugg (D)	27D, 21R, 2I	60D, 40R	Thomas A. Hendricks (D)	Henry S. Lane (R)	7D, 4R	Lincoln/ Johnson (NU) ✓
1865	Oliver P. Morton (R)	Conrad Baker (R)	Delano E. Williamson (R)	Nelson Trusler (R)	John I. Morrison (R)	Thomas B. McCarthy (R)	George W. Hoss (D)	25R, 25D (Note: With a split Senate, Paris C. Dunning, a Democrat, continued as President Pro Tempore from his time leading it in 1863 when he was acting Lt. Governor. He had cut most ties with the Democratic party at the start of the Civil War, however, and acted functionally as an independent and supported the Republican Governor.)	54R, 46D	Thomas A. Hendricks (D)	Henry S. Lane (R)	8R, 3D	Lincoln/ Johnson (NU) ✓
1866	Oliver P. Morton (R)	Conrad Baker (R)	Delano E. Williamson (R)	Nelson Trusler (R)	John I. Morrison (R)	Thomas B. McCarthy (R)	George W. Hoss (D)	25R, 25D	54R, 46D	Thomas A. Hendricks (D)	Henry S. Lane (R)	8R, 3D	Lincoln/ Johnson (NU) ✓
1867	Conrad Baker (R)	William Cumback (R)	Delano E. Williamson (R)	Nelson Trusler (R)	Nathan Kimball (R)	Thomas B. McCarthy (R)	George W. Hoss (D)	30R, 20D	61R, 39D	Thomas A. Hendricks (D)	Oliver P. Morton (R)	8R, 3D	Lincoln/ Johnson (NU) ✓
1868	Conrad Baker (R)	William Cumback (R)	Delano E. Williamson (R)	Nelson Trusler (R)	Nathan Kimball (R)	Thomas B. McCarthy (R)	George W. Hoss (D)	30R, 20D	61R, 39D	Thomas A. Hendricks (D)	Oliver P. Morton (R)	8R, 3D	Grant/ Colfax (R) ✓
1868	Conrad Baker (R)	William Cumback (R)	Delano E. Williamson (R)	Nelson Trusler (R)	Nathan Kimball (R)	Thomas B. McCarthy (R)	Barnabas C. Hobbs (R)	30R, 20D	61R, 39D	Thomas A. Hendricks (D)	Oliver P. Morton (R)	8R, 3D	Grant/ Colfax (R) ✓
1869	Conrad Baker (R)	William Cumback (R)	Delano E. Williamson (R)	Max F. A. Hoffman (R)	Nathan Kimball (R)	John D. Evans (R)	Barnabas C. Hobbs (R)	33R, 17D	57R, 43D	Daniel D. Pratt (R)	Oliver P. Morton (R)	7R, 4D	Grant/ Colfax (R) ✓
1870	Conrad Baker (R)	William Cumback (R)	Delano E. Williamson (R)	Max F. A. Hoffman (R)	Nathan Kimball (R)	John D. Evans (R)	Barnabas C. Hobbs (R)	33R, 17D	57R, 43D	Daniel D. Pratt (R)	Oliver P. Morton (R)	7R, 4D	Grant/ Colfax (R) ✓
1871	Conrad Baker (R)	William Cumback (R)	Bayless W. Hanna (D)	Norman Eddy (D)	James B. Ryan (D)	John C. Shoemaker (D)	Milton B. Hopkins (D)	25R, 25D (Note: No President Pro Tempore was elected, with Lt. Gov. Cumback taking the role of presiding over the Senate directly, giving Republicans functional control.)	54D, 46R	Daniel D. Pratt (R)	Oliver P. Morton (R)	6R, 5D	Grant/ Colfax (R) ✓
1872	Conrad Baker (R)	William Cumback (R)	Bayless W. Hanna (D)	John H. Farquhar (R)	James B. Ryan (D)	John C. Shoemaker (D)	Milton B. Hopkins (D)	25R, 25D	54D, 46R	Daniel D. Pratt (R)	Oliver P. Morton (R)	6R, 5D	Grant/ Wilson (R) ✓
1873	Thomas A. Hendricks (D)	Leonidas Sexton (R)	James C. Denny (R)	William W. Curry (R)	John B. Glover (R)	James A. Wildman (R)	Milton B. Hopkins (D)	27R, 23D	54R, 46D	Daniel D. Pratt (R)	Oliver P. Morton (R)	10R, 3D	Grant/ Wilson (R) ✓
1874	Thomas A. Hendricks (D)	Leonidas Sexton (R)	James C. Denny (R)	William W. Curry (R)	John B. Glover (R)	James A. Wildman (R)	Alexander C. Hopkins (D)	27R, 23D	54R, 46D	Daniel D. Pratt (R)	Oliver P. Morton (R)	10R, 3D	Grant/ Wilson (R) ✓
1875	Thomas A. Hendricks (D)	Leonidas Sexton (R)	Clarence A. Buskirk (D)	John E. Neff (D)	Benjamin C. Shaw (D)	Ebenezer Henderson (D)	James H. Smart (D)	23D, 22R, 5I (Note: No President Pro Tempore was elected, with Lt. Gov. Sexton taking the role of presiding over the Senate directly, giving Republicans functional control with the Independents.)	60D, 32R, 8I	Joseph E. McDonald (D)	Oliver P. Morton (R)	8D, 5R	Grant/ Wilson (R) ✓
1876	Thomas A. Hendricks (D)	Leonidas Sexton (R)	Clarence A. Buskirk (D)	John E. Neff (D)	Benjamin C. Shaw (D)	Ebenezer Henderson (D)	James H. Smart (D)	23D, 22R, 5I	60D, 32R, 8I	Joseph E. McDonald (D)	Oliver P. Morton (R)	8D, 5R	Tilden/ Hendricks (D) ✗
1877	James D. Williams (D)	Isaac P. Gray (D)	Clarence A. Buskirk (D)	John E. Neff (D)	Benjamin C. Shaw (D)	Ebenezer Henderson (D)	James H. Smart (D)	25D, 24R, 1I (Note: No President Pro Tempore was elected, with Lt. Gov. Gray taking the role of presiding over the Senate directly and breaking ties, giving Democrats functional control with the Independent.)	54R, 46D	Joseph E. McDonald (D)	Oliver P. Morton (R)	9R, 4D	Tilden/ Hendricks (D) ✗
1878	James D. Williams (D)	Isaac P. Gray (D)	Clarence A. Buskirk (D)	John E. Neff (D)	Benjamin C. Shaw (D)	Ebenezer Henderson (D)	James H. Smart (D)	25D, 24R, 1I	54R, 46D	Joseph E. McDonald (D)	Daniel W. Voorhees (D)	9R, 4D	Tilden/ Hendricks (D) ✗
1879	James D. Williams (D)	Isaac P. Gray (D)	Thomas W. Woollen (D)	John G. Shanklin (D)	William Fleming (D)	Mahlon Dickerson; Manson (D)	James H. Smart (D)	24D, 23R, 2GB, 1I (Note: No President Pro Tempore was elected, with Lt. Gov. Gray taking the role of presiding over the Senate directly and breaking ties, giving Democrats functional control with Greenback cooperation.)	52D, 39R, 9GB	Joseph E. McDonald (D)	Daniel W. Voorhees (D)	6D, 6R, 1GB	Tilden/ Hendricks (D) ✗
1880	Isaac P. Gray (D)	Isaac P. Gray (D)	Thomas W. Woollen (D)	John G. Shanklin (D)	William Fleming (D)	Mahlon Dickerson; Manson (D)	James H. Smart (D)	24D, 23R, 2GB, 1I	52D, 39R, 9GB	Joseph E. McDonald (D)	Daniel W. Voorhees (D)	6D, 6R, 1GB	Garfield/ Arthur (R) ✓
1881	Albert G. Porter (R)	Thomas Hanna (R)	Daniel P. Baldwin (R)	Emanuel R. Hawn (R)	Roswell S. Hill (R)	Edward H. Wolfe (R)	John M. Bloss (R)	24D, 24R, 2GB (Note: A Democrat, Frederick W. Viehe, was elected President Pro Tempore.)	58R, 41D, 1I	Benjamin Harrison (R)	Daniel W. Voorhees (D)	8R, 5D	Garfield/ Arthur (R) ✓
1882	Albert G. Porter (R)	Thomas Hanna (R)	Daniel P. Baldwin (R)	Emanuel R. Hawn (R)	Roswell S. Hill (R)	Edward H. Wolfe (R)	John M. Bloss (R)	24D, 24R, 2GB	58R, 41D, 1I	Benjamin Harrison (R)	Daniel W. Voorhees (D)	8R, 5D	Garfield/ Arthur (R) ✓
1883	Albert G. Porter (R)	Thomas Hanna (R)	Francis T. Hord (D)	William R. Myers (D)	John J. Cooper (D)	James H. Rice (D)	John W. Holcombe (D)	28D, 22R	58D, 42R	Benjamin Harrison (R)	Daniel W. Voorhees (D)	10D, 2R, 1A-M	Garfield/ Arthur (R) ✓
1884	Albert G. Porter (R)	Thomas Hanna (R)	Francis T. Hord (D)	William R. Myers (D)	John J. Cooper (D)	James H. Rice (D)	John W. Holcombe (D)	28D, 22R	58D, 42R	Benjamin Harrison (R)	Daniel W. Voorhees (D)	10D, 2R, 1A-M	Cleveland/ Hendricks (D) ✓
1885	Isaac P. Gray (D)	Mahlon Dickerson; Manson (D)	Francis T. Hord (D)	William R. Myers (D)	John J. Cooper (D)	James H. Rice (D)	John W. Holcombe (D)	31D, 19R	65D, 35R	Benjamin Harrison (R)	Daniel W. Voorhees (D)	9D, 4R	Cleveland/ Hendricks (D) ✓
1886	Isaac P. Gray (D)	Mahlon Dickerson; Manson (D)	Francis T. Hord (D)	William R. Myers (D)	John J. Cooper (D)	James H. Rice (D)	John W. Holcombe (D)	31D, 19R	65D, 35R	Benjamin Harrison (R)	Daniel W. Voorhees (D)	9D, 4R	Cleveland/ Hendricks (D) ✓
1886	Isaac P. Gray (D)	Alonzo G. Smith (D)	Francis T. Hord (D)	William R. Myers (D)	John J. Cooper (D)	James H. Rice (D)	John W. Holcombe (D)	31D, 19R	65D, 35R	Benjamin Harrison (R)	Daniel W. Voorhees (D)	9D, 4R	Cleveland/ Hendricks (D) ✓
1887	Isaac P. Gray (D)	Alonzo G. Smith (D)	Louis T. Michener (R)	Charles F. Griffin (R)	Julius Augustus Lemcke (R)	Bruce Carr (R)	Harvey M. LaFollette (R)	31D, 19R	55R, 45R	David Turpie (D)	Daniel W. Voorhees (D)	7R, 6D	Cleveland/ Hendricks (D) ✓
1888	Isaac P. Gray (D)	Alonzo G. Smith (D)	Louis T. Michener (R)	Charles F. Griffin (R)	Julius Augustus Lemcke (R)	Bruce Carr (R)	Harvey M. LaFollette (R)	31D, 19R	55R, 45R	David Turpie (D)	Daniel W. Voorhees (D)	7R, 6D	Harrison/ Morton (R) ✓
1889	Alvin Peterson Hovey (R)	Ira Joy Chase (R)	Louis T. Michener (R)	Charles F. Griffin (R)	Julius Augustus Lemcke (R)	Bruce Carr (R)	Harvey M. LaFollette (R)	27D, 23R	57D, 43R	David Turpie (D)	Daniel W. Voorhees (D)	10D, 3R	Harrison/ Morton (R) ✓
1890	Alvin Peterson Hovey (R)	Ira Joy Chase (R)	Louis T. Michener (R)	Charles F. Griffin (R)	Julius Augustus Lemcke (R)	Bruce Carr (R)	Harvey M. LaFollette (R)	27D, 23R	57D, 43R	David Turpie (D)	Daniel W. Voorhees (D)	10D, 3R	Harrison/ Morton (R) ✓
1891	Alvin Peterson Hovey (R)	Ira Joy Chase (R)	Alonzo G. Smith (D)	Claude Matthews (D)	Albert Gall (D)	John Oliver; Henderson (D)	Hervey D. Vories (D)	34D, 16R	74D, 26R	David Turpie (D)	Daniel W. Voorhees (D)	11D, 2R	Harrison/ Morton (R) ✓
1891	Ira Joy Chase (R)	Francis M. Griffin (R)	Alonzo G. Smith (D)	Claude Matthews (D)	Albert Gall (D)	John Oliver; Henderson (D)	Hervey D. Vories (D)	34D, 16R	74D, 26R	David Turpie (D)	Daniel W. Voorhees (D)	11D, 2R	Harrison/ Morton (R) ✓
1892	Ira Joy Chase (R)	Francis M. Griffin (R)	Alonzo G. Smith (D)	Claude Matthews (D)	Albert Gall (D)	John Oliver; Henderson (D)	Hervey D. Vories (D)	34D, 16R	74D, 26R	David Turpie (D)	Daniel W. Voorhees (D)	11D, 2R	Cleveland/ Stevenson (D) ✓
1893	Claude Matthews (D)	Mortimer Nye (D)	Alonzo G. Smith (D)	Myron D. King (D)	Albert Gall (D)	John Oliver; Henderson (D)	Hervey D. Vories (D)	35D, 15R	63D, 37R	David Turpie (D)	Daniel W. Voorhees (D)	11D, 2R	Cleveland/ Stevenson (D) ✓
1894	Claude Matthews (D)	Mortimer Nye (D)	Alonzo G. Smith (D)	William R. Myers (D)	Albert Gall (D)	John Oliver; Henderson (D)	Hervey D. Vories (D)	35D, 15R	63D, 37R	David Turpie (D)	Daniel W. Voorhees (D)	11D, 2R	Cleveland/ Stevenson (D) ✓
1895	Claude Matthews (D)	Mortimer Nye (D)	William A. Ketcham (R)	William D. Owen (R)	Frederick J. Scholz (R)	Americus C. Daily (R)	David M. Geeting (R)	32R, 18D	82R, 18D	David Turpie (D)	Daniel W. Voorhees (D)	13R	Cleveland/ Stevenson (D) ✓
1896	Claude Matthews (D)	Mortimer Nye (D)	William A. Ketcham (R)	William D. Owen (R)	Frederick J. Scholz (R)	Americus C. Daily (R)	David M. Geeting (R)	32R, 18D	82R, 18D	David Turpie (D)	Daniel W. Voorhees (D)	13R	McKinley/ Hobart (R) ✓
1897	James A. Mount (R)	William S. Haggard (R)	William A. Ketcham (R)	William D. Owen (R)	Frederick J. Scholz (R)	Americus C. Daily (R)	David M. Geeting (R)	33R, 14D, 2Pop, 1?	52R, 39D, 9Pop	David Turpie (D)	Charles W. Fairbanks (R)	9R, 4D	McKinley/ Hobart (R) ✓
1898	James A. Mount (R)	William S. Haggard (R)	William A. Ketcham (R)	William D. Owen (R)	Frederick J. Scholz (R)	Americus C. Daily (R)	David M. Geeting (R)	33R, 14D, 2Pop, 1?	52R, 39D, 9Pop	David Turpie (D)	Charles W. Fairbanks (R)	9R, 4D	McKinley/ Hobart (R) ✓
1899	James A. Mount (R)	William S. Haggard (R)	William L. Taylor (R)	Union B. Hunt (R)	Leopold Levy (R)	William H. Hart (R)	Frank L. Jones (R)	29R, 20D	60R, 30D	Albert J. Beveridge (R)	Charles W. Fairbanks (R)	9R, 4D	McKinley/ Hobart (R) ✓
1900	James A. Mount (R)	William S. Haggard (R)	William L. Taylor (R)	Union B. Hunt (R)	Leopold Levy (R)	William H. Hart (R)	Frank L. Jones (R)	29R, 20D	60R, 30D	Albert J. Beveridge (R)	Charles W. Fairbanks (R)	9R, 4D	McKinley/ Roosevelt (R) ✓
1901	Winfield T. Durbin (R)	Newton W. Gilbert (R)	William L. Taylor (R)	Union B. Hunt (R)	Leopold Levy (R)	William H. Hart (R)	Frank L. Jones (R)	33R, 17D	61R, 39D	Albert J. Beveridge (R)	Charles W. Fairbanks (R)	9R, 4D	McKinley/ Roosevelt (R) ✓
1902	Winfield T. Durbin (R)	Newton W. Gilbert (R)	William L. Taylor (R)	Union B. Hunt (R)	Leopold Levy (R)	William H. Hart (R)	Frank L. Jones (R)	33R, 17D	61R, 39D	Albert J. Beveridge (R)	Charles W. Fairbanks (R)	9R, 4D	McKinley/ Roosevelt (R) ✓
1903	Winfield T. Durbin (R)	Newton W. Gilbert (R)	Charles W. Miller (R)	Daniel E. Storms (R)	Nathaniel U. Hill (R)	David E. Sherrick (R)	Fassett A. Cotton (R)	35R, 15D	66R, 34D	Albert J. Beveridge (R)	Charles W. Fairbanks (R)	9R, 4D	McKinley/ Roosevelt (R) ✓
1904	Winfield T. Durbin (R)	Newton W. Gilbert (R)	Charles W. Miller (R)	Daniel E. Storms (R)	Nathaniel U. Hill (R)	David E. Sherrick (R)	Fassett A. Cotton (R)	35R, 15D	66R, 34D	Albert J. Beveridge (R)	Charles W. Fairbanks (R)	9R, 4D	Roosevelt/ Fairbanks (R) ✓
1905	Frank Hanly (R)	Hugh Thomas Miller (R)	Charles W. Miller (R)	Daniel E. Storms (R)	Nathaniel U. Hill (R)	David E. Sherrick (R)	Fassett A. Cotton (R)	36R, 14D	79R, 21D	Albert J. Beveridge (R)	James A. Hemenway (R)	11R, 2D	Roosevelt/ Fairbanks (R) ✓
1905	Frank Hanly (R)	Hugh Thomas Miller (R)	Charles W. Miller (R)	Daniel E. Storms (R)	Nathaniel U. Hill (R)	Warren Bigler (R)	Fassett A. Cotton (R)	36R, 14D	79R, 21D	Albert J. Beveridge (R)	James A. Hemenway (R)	11R, 2D	Roosevelt/ Fairbanks (R) ✓
1906	Frank Hanly (R)	Hugh Thomas Miller (R)	Charles W. Miller (R)	Daniel E. Storms (R)	Nathaniel U. Hill (R)	Warren Bigler (R)	Fassett A. Cotton (R)	36R, 14D	79R, 21D	Albert J. Beveridge (R)	James A. Hemenway (R)	11R, 2D	Roosevelt/ Fairbanks (R) ✓
1906	Frank Hanly (R)	Hugh Thomas Miller (R)	Charles W. Miller (R)	Fred A. Sims (R)	Nathaniel U. Hill (R)	Warren Bigler (R)	Fassett A. Cotton (R)	36R, 14D	79R, 21D	Albert J. Beveridge (R)	James A. Hemenway (R)	11R, 2D	Roosevelt/ Fairbanks (R) ✓
1907	Frank Hanly (R)	Hugh Thomas Miller (R)	James Bingham (R)	Fred A. Sims (R)	Oscar C. Hadley (R)	John C. Billheimer (R)	Fassett A. Cotton (R)	37R, 13D	53R, 47D	Albert J. Beveridge (R)	James A. Hemenway (R)	9R, 4D	Roosevelt/ Fairbanks (R) ✓
1908	Frank Hanly (R)	Hugh Thomas Miller (R)	James Bingham (R)	Fred A. Sims (R)	Oscar C. Hadley (R)	John C. Billheimer (R)	Fassett A. Cotton (R)	37R, 13D	53R, 47D	Albert J. Beveridge (R)	James A. Hemenway (R)	9R, 4D	Taft/ Sherman (R) ✓
1909	Thomas R. Marshall (D)	Frank J. Hall (D)	James Bingham (R)	Fred A. Sims (R)	Oscar C. Hadley (R)	John C. Billheimer (R)	Robert J. Aley (D)	27R, 23D	60D, 40R	Albert J. Beveridge (R)	Benjamin F. Shively (D)	11D, 2R	Taft/ Sherman (R) ✓
1910	Thomas R. Marshall (D)	Frank J. Hall (D)	James Bingham (R)	Fred A. Sims (R)	Oscar C. Hadley (R)	John C. Billheimer (R)	Charles A. Greathouse (D)	27R, 23D	60D, 40R	Albert J. Beveridge (R)	Benjamin F. Shively (D)	11D, 2R	Taft/ Sherman (R) ✓
1911	Thomas R. Marshall (D)	Frank J. Hall (D)	Thomas M. Honan (D)	L. G. Ellingham (D)	William H. Vollmer (D)	William H. O'Brien (D)	Charles A. Greathouse (D)	30D, 20R	60D, 40R	John W. Kern (D)	Benjamin F. Shively (D)	12D, 1R	Taft/ Sherman (R) ✓
1912	Thomas R. Marshall (D)	Frank J. Hall (D)	Thomas M. Honan (D)	L. G. Ellingham (D)	William H. Vollmer (D)	William H. O'Brien (D)	Charles A. Greathouse (D)	30D, 20R	60D, 40R	John W. Kern (D)	Benjamin F. Shively (D)	12D, 1R	Wilson/ Marshall (D) ✓
1913	Samuel M. Ralston (D)	William P. O'Neill (D)	Thomas M. Honan (D)	L. G. Ellingham (D)	William H. Vollmer (D)	William H. O'Brien (D)	Charles A. Greathouse (D)	40D, 8R, 2Prog	95D, 4R, 1Prog	John W. Kern (D)	Benjamin F. Shively (D)	13D	Wilson/ Marshall (D) ✓
1914	Samuel M. Ralston (D)	William P. O'Neill (D)	Thomas M. Honan (D)	L. G. Ellingham (D)	William H. Vollmer (D)	William H. O'Brien (D)	Charles A. Greathouse (D)	40D, 8R, 2Prog	95D, 4R, 1Prog	John W. Kern (D)	Benjamin F. Shively (D)	13D	Wilson/ Marshall (D) ✓
1915	Samuel M. Ralston (D)	William P. O'Neill (D)	Richard M. Milburn (D)	Homer L. Cook (D)	George A. Bittler (D)	Dale J. Crittenberger (D)	Charles A. Greathouse (D)	41D, 8R, 1Prog	60D, 39R, 1Prog	John W. Kern (D)	Benjamin F. Shively (D)	11D, 2R	Wilson/ Marshall (D) ✓
1916	Samuel M. Ralston (D)	William P. O'Neill (D)	Evan B. Stotsenburg (D)	Homer L. Cook (D)	George A. Bittler (D)	Dale J. Crittenberger (D)	Charles A. Greathouse (D)	41D, 8R, 1Prog	60D, 39R, 1Prog	John W. Kern (D)	Thomas Taggart (D)	11D, 2R	Hughes/ Fairbanks (R) ✗
1917	James P. Goodrich (R)	Edgar D. Bush (R)	Ele Stansbury (R)	Edward L. Jackson (R)	Uz McMurtrie (R)	Otto K. Klauss (R)	Horace D. Ellis (R)	25D, 24R, 1Prog (Note: A Republican, Arthur Raymond Robinson, was elected President Pro Tempore.)	82R, 18D	Harry S. New (R)	James E. Watson (R)	9R, 4D	Hughes/ Fairbanks (R) ✗
1918	James P. Goodrich (R)	Edgar D. Bush (R)	Ele Stansbury (R)	William A. Roach (R)	Uz McMurtrie (R)	Otto K. Klauss (R)	Horace D. Ellis (R)	25D, 24R, 1Prog	82R, 18D	Harry S. New (R)	James E. Watson (R)	9R, 4D	Hughes/ Fairbanks (R) ✗
1919	James P. Goodrich (R)	Edgar D. Bush (R)	Ele Stansbury (R)	William A. Roach (R)	Uz McMurtrie (R)	Otto K. Klauss (R)	Linnaeus N. Hines (R)	34R, 16D	82R, 18D	Harry S. New (R)	James E. Watson (R)	13R	Hughes/ Fairbanks (R) ✗
1920	James P. Goodrich (R)	Edgar D. Bush (R)	Ele Stansbury (R)	Edward L. Jackson (R)	Uz McMurtrie (R)	Otto K. Klauss (R)	Linnaeus N. Hines (R)	34R, 16D	82R, 18D	Harry S. New (R)	James E. Watson (R)	13R	Harding/ Coolidge (R) ✓
1921	Warren T. McCray (R)	Emmett Forest Branch (R)	U. S. Lesh (R)	Edward L. Jackson (R)	Ora J. Davies (R)	William G. Oliver (R)	Benjamin J. Burris (R)	41R, 9D	89R, 11D	Harry S. New (R)	James E. Watson (R)	13R	Harding/ Coolidge (R) ✓
1922	Warren T. McCray (R)	Emmett Forest Branch (R)	U. S. Lesh (R)	Edward L. Jackson (R)	Ora J. Davies (R)	William G. Oliver (R)	Benjamin J. Burris (R)	41R, 9D	89R, 11D	Harry S. New (R)	James E. Watson (R)	13R	Harding/ Coolidge (R) ✓
1923	Warren T. McCray (R)	Emmett Forest Branch (R)	U. S. Lesh (R)	Edward L. Jackson (R)	Ora J. Davies (R)	Robert Bracken (D)	Benjamin J. Burris (R)	32R, 18D	52R, 48D	Samuel M. Ralston (D)	James E. Watson (R)	8R, 5D	Harding/ Coolidge (R) ✓
1924	Emmett Forest Branch (R)	James J. Nejdl (R)	U. S. Lesh (R)	Edward L. Jackson (R)	Ora J. Davies (R)	Robert Bracken (D)	Henry N. Sherwood (R)	32R, 18D	52R, 48D	Samuel M. Ralston (D)	James E. Watson (R)	8R, 5D	Coolidge/ Dawes (R) ✓
1925	Edward L. Jackson (R)	F. Harold Van Orman (R)	Arthur L. Gilliom (R)	Fred Schortemeier (R)	Bernhardt H. Urbahns (R)	Lewis S. Bowman (R)	Henry N. Sherwood (R)	32R, 18D	84R, 16D	Samuel M. Ralston (D)	James E. Watson (R)	10R, 3D	Coolidge/ Dawes (R) ✓
1925	Edward L. Jackson (R)	F. Harold Van Orman (R)	Arthur L. Gilliom (R)	Fred Schortemeier (R)	Bernhardt H. Urbahns (R)	Lewis S. Bowman (R)	Henry N. Sherwood (R)	32R, 18D	84R, 16D	Arthur Raymond; Robinson (R)	James E. Watson (R)	10R, 3D	Coolidge/ Dawes (R) ✓
1926	Edward L. Jackson (R)	F. Harold Van Orman (R)	Arthur L. Gilliom (R)	Fred Schortemeier (R)	Bernhardt H. Urbahns (R)	Lewis S. Bowman (R)	Henry N. Sherwood (R)	32R, 18D	84R, 16D	Arthur Raymond; Robinson (R)	James E. Watson (R)	10R, 3D	Coolidge/ Dawes (R) ✓
1926	Edward L. Jackson (R)	F. Harold Van Orman (R)	Arthur L. Gilliom (R)	Fred Schortemeier (R)	Grace Urbahns (R)	Lewis S. Bowman (R)	Henry N. Sherwood (R)	32R, 18D	84R, 16D	Arthur Raymond; Robinson (R)	James E. Watson (R)	10R, 3D	Coolidge/ Dawes (R) ✓
1927	Edward L. Jackson (R)	F. Harold Van Orman (R)	Arthur L. Gilliom (R)	Fred Schortemeier (R)	Grace Urbahns (R)	Lewis S. Bowman (R)	Charles F. Miller (R)	35R, 15D	63R, 37D	Arthur Raymond; Robinson (R)	James E. Watson (R)	10R, 3D	Coolidge/ Dawes (R) ✓
1928	Edward L. Jackson (R)	F. Harold Van Orman (R)	Arthur L. Gilliom (R)	Fred Schortemeier (R)	Grace Urbahns (R)	Lewis S. Bowman (R)	Roy P. Wisehart (R)	35R, 15D	63R, 37D	Arthur Raymond; Robinson (R)	James E. Watson (R)	10R, 3D	Hoover/ Curtis (R) ✓
1929	Harry G. Leslie (R)	Edgar D. Bush (R)	James M. Ogden (R)	Otto G. Fifield (R)	Grace Urbahns (R)	Arch Bobbitt (R)	Roy P. Wisehart (R)	38R, 12D	80R, 20D	Arthur Raymond; Robinson (R)	James E. Watson (R)	10R, 3D	Hoover/ Curtis (R) ✓
1930	Harry G. Leslie (R)	Edgar D. Bush (R)	James M. Ogden (R)	Otto G. Fifield (R)	Grace Urbahns (R)	Arch Bobbitt (R)	Roy P. Wisehart (R)	38R, 12D	80R, 20D	Arthur Raymond; Robinson (R)	James E. Watson (R)	10R, 3D	Hoover/ Curtis (R) ✓
1931	Harry G. Leslie (R)	Edgar D. Bush (R)	James M. Ogden (R)	Frank Mayr Jr. (D)	William Storen (D)	Floyd E. Williamson (D)	George C. Cole (D)	29R, 18D	75D, 25R	Arthur Raymond; Robinson (R)	James E. Watson (R)	9D, 4R	Hoover/ Curtis (R) ✓
1932	Harry G. Leslie (R)	Edgar D. Bush (R)	James M. Ogden (R)	Frank Mayr Jr. (D)	William Storen (D)	Floyd E. Williamson (D)	George C. Cole (D)	29R, 18D	75D, 25R	Arthur Raymond; Robinson (R)	James E. Watson (R)	9D, 4R	Roosevelt/ Garner (D) ✓
1933	Paul V. McNutt (D)	M. Clifford Townsend (D)	Philip Lutz Jr. (D)	Frank Mayr Jr. (D)	William Storen (D)	Floyd E. Williamson (D)	George C. Cole (D)	43D, 7R	91D, 9R	Arthur Raymond; Robinson (R)	Frederick Van Nuys (D)	12D	Roosevelt/ Garner (D) ✓
1934	Paul V. McNutt (D)	M. Clifford Townsend (D)	Philip Lutz Jr. (D)	Frank Mayr Jr. (D)	William Storen (D)	Floyd E. Williamson (D)	Floyd I. McMurray (D)	43D, 7R	91D, 9R	Arthur Raymond; Robinson (R)	Frederick Van Nuys (D)	12D	Roosevelt/ Garner (D) ✓
1935	Paul V. McNutt (D)	M. Clifford Townsend (D)	Philip Lutz Jr. (D)	August G. Mueller (D)	Peter F. Hein (D)	Laurence F. Sullivan (D)	Floyd I. McMurray (D)	38D, 12R	65D, 35R	Sherman Minton (D)	Frederick Van Nuys (D)	11D, 1R	Roosevelt/ Garner (D) ✓
1936	Paul V. McNutt (D)	M. Clifford Townsend (D)	Philip Lutz Jr. (D)	August G. Mueller (D)	Peter F. Hein (D)	Laurence F. Sullivan (D)	Floyd I. McMurray (D)	38D, 12R	65D, 35R	Sherman Minton (D)	Frederick Van Nuys (D)	11D, 1R	Roosevelt/ Garner (D) ✓
1937	M. Clifford Townsend (D)	Henry F. Schricker (D)	Omer Stokes Jackson (D)	August G. Mueller (D)	Peter F. Hein (D)	Laurence F. Sullivan (D)	Floyd I. McMurray (D)	38D, 12R	77D, 23R	Sherman Minton (D)	Frederick Van Nuys (D)	11D, 1R	Roosevelt/ Garner (D) ✓
1938	M. Clifford Townsend (D)	Henry F. Schricker (D)	Omer Stokes Jackson (D)	August G. Mueller (D)	Peter F. Hein (D)	Laurence F. Sullivan (D)	Floyd I. McMurray (D)	38D, 12R	77D, 23R	Sherman Minton (D)	Frederick Van Nuys (D)	11D, 1R	Roosevelt/ Garner (D) ✓
1939	M. Clifford Townsend (D)	Henry F. Schricker (D)	Omer Stokes Jackson (D)	James M. Tucker (R)	Joseph M. Robertson (D)	Frank G. Thompson (D)	Floyd I. McMurray (D)	33D, 17R	51R, 49D	Sherman Minton (D)	Frederick Van Nuys (D)	7R, 5D	Roosevelt/ Garner (D) ✓
1940	M. Clifford Townsend (D)	Henry F. Schricker (D)	Samuel D. Jackson (D)	James M. Tucker (R)	Joseph M. Robertson (D)	Frank G. Thompson (D)	Floyd I. McMurray (D)	33D, 17R	51R, 49D	Sherman Minton (D)	Frederick Van Nuys (D)	7R, 5D	Willkie/ McNary (R) ✗
1941	Henry F. Schricker (D)	Charles M. Dawson (D)	George N. Beamer (D)	James M. Tucker (R)	James M. Givens (R)	Richard T. James (R)	Clement T. Malan (R)	32R, 18D	65R, 35D	Raymond E. Willis (R)	Frederick Van Nuys (D)	8R, 4D	Willkie/ McNary (R) ✗
1942	Henry F. Schricker (D)	Charles M. Dawson (D)	George N. Beamer (D)	Maurice G. Robinson (R)	James M. Givens (R)	Richard T. James (R)	Clement T. Malan (R)	32R, 18D	65R, 35D	Raymond E. Willis (R)	Frederick Van Nuys (D)	8R, 4D	Willkie/ McNary (R) ✗
1943	Henry F. Schricker (D)	Charles M. Dawson (D)	James Emmert (R)	Rue J. Alexander (R)	James M. Givens (R)	Richard T. James (R)	Clement T. Malan (R)	38R, 12D	82R, 18D	Raymond E. Willis (R)	Frederick Van Nuys (D)	9R, 2D	Willkie/ McNary (R) ✗
1944	Henry F. Schricker (D)	Charles M. Dawson (D)	James Emmert (R)	Rue J. Alexander (R)	James M. Givens (R)	Richard T. James (R)	Clement T. Malan (R)	38R, 12D	82R, 18D	Raymond E. Willis (R)	Frederick Van Nuys (D)	9R, 2D	Dewey/ Bricker (R) ✗
1944	Henry F. Schricker (D)	Charles M. Dawson (D)	James Emmert (R)	Rue J. Alexander (R)	James M. Givens (R)	Richard T. James (R)	Clement T. Malan (R)	38R, 12D	82R, 18D	Raymond E. Willis (R)	Samuel D. Jackson (D)	9R, 2D	Dewey/ Bricker (R) ✗
1944	Henry F. Schricker (D)	Charles M. Dawson (D)	James Emmert (R)	Rue J. Alexander (R)	James M. Givens (R)	Richard T. James (R)	Clement T. Malan (R)	38R, 12D	82R, 18D	Raymond E. Willis (R)	William E. Jenner (R)	9R, 2D	Dewey/ Bricker (R) ✗
1945	Ralph F. Gates (R)	Richard T. James (R)	James Emmert (R)	Rue J. Alexander (R)	Frank T. Millis (R)	Alvan V. Burch (R)	Clement T. Malan (R)	37R, 13D	69R, 31D	Raymond E. Willis (R)	Homer E. Capehart (R)	9R, 2D	Dewey/ Bricker (R) ✗
1946	Ralph F. Gates (R)	Richard T. James (R)	James Emmert (R)	Rue J. Alexander (R)	Frank T. Millis (R)	Alvan V. Burch (R)	Clement T. Malan (R)	37R, 13D	69R, 31D	Raymond E. Willis (R)	Homer E. Capehart (R)	9R, 2D	Dewey/ Bricker (R) ✗
1947	Ralph F. Gates (R)	Richard T. James (R)	Cleon H. Foust (R)	Thomas E. Bath Jr. (R)	Frank T. Millis (R)	Alvan V. Burch (R)	Ben H. Watt (R)	32R, 18D	87R, 13D	William E. Jenner (R)	Homer E. Capehart (R)	9R, 2D	Dewey/ Bricker (R) ✗
1948	Ralph F. Gates (R)	Rue J. Alexander (D)	Cleon H. Foust (R)	Thomas E. Bath Jr. (R)	Frank T. Millis (R)	Alvan V. Burch (R)	Ben H. Watt (R)	32R, 18D	87R, 13D	William E. Jenner (R)	Homer E. Capehart (R)	9R, 2D	Dewey/ Warren (R) ✗
1949	Henry F. Schricker (D)	John A. Watkins (D)	J. Emmett; McManamon (D)	Charles F. Fleming (D)	F. Shirley Wilcox (D)	James M. Propst (D)	Deane E. Walker (D)	29R, 21D	60R, 40D	William E. Jenner (R)	Homer E. Capehart (R)	7D, 4R	Dewey/ Warren (R) ✗
1950	Henry F. Schricker (D)	John A. Watkins (D)	J. Emmett; McManamon (D)	Charles F. Fleming (D)	F. Shirley Wilcox (D)	James M. Propst (D)	Deane E. Walker (D)	29R, 21D	60R, 40D	William E. Jenner (R)	Homer E. Capehart (R)	7D, 4R	Dewey/ Warren (R) ✗
1951	Henry F. Schricker (D)	John A. Watkins (D)	J. Emmett; McManamon (D)	Leland L. Smith (R)	William L. Fortune (R)	Frank Millis (R)	Wilbur E. Young (R)	26R, 24D	69R, 31D	William E. Jenner (R)	Homer E. Capehart (R)	9R, 2D	Dewey/ Warren (R) ✗
1952	Henry F. Schricker (D)	John A. Watkins (D)	J. Emmett; McManamon (D)	Leland L. Smith (R)	William L. Fortune (R)	Frank Millis (R)	Wilbur E. Young (R)	26R, 24D	69R, 31D	William E. Jenner (R)	Homer E. Capehart (R)	9R, 2D	Eisenhower/ Nixon (R) ✓
1953	George N. Craig (R)	Harold W. Handley (R)	Edwin K. Steers (R)	Crawford F. Parker (R)	John Peters (R)	Frank Millis (R)	Wilbur E. Young (R)	40R, 10D	81R, 19D	William E. Jenner (R)	Homer E. Capehart (R)	10R, 1D	Eisenhower/ Nixon (R) ✓
1954	George N. Craig (R)	Harold W. Handley (R)	Edwin K. Steers (R)	Crawford F. Parker (R)	John Peters (R)	Frank Millis (R)	Wilbur E. Young (R)	40R, 10D	81R, 19D	William E. Jenner (R)	Homer E. Capehart (R)	10R, 1D	Eisenhower/ Nixon (R) ✓
1955	George N. Craig (R)	Harold W. Handley (R)	Edwin K. Steers (R)	Crawford F. Parker (R)	John Peters (R)	Curtis E. Rardin (R)	Wilbur E. Young (R)	35R, 15D	63R, 37D	William E. Jenner (R)	Homer E. Capehart (R)	9R, 2D	Eisenhower/ Nixon (R) ✓
1956	George N. Craig (R)	Harold W. Handley (R)	Edwin K. Steers (R)	Crawford F. Parker (R)	John Peters (R)	Curtis E. Rardin (R)	Wilbur E. Young (R)	35R, 15D	63R, 37D	William E. Jenner (R)	Homer E. Capehart (R)	9R, 2D	Eisenhower/ Nixon (R) ✓
1957	Harold W. Handley (R)	Crawford F. Parker (R)	Edwin K. Steers (R)	Frank A. Lenning (R)	Aldolph L. Fossler (R)	Roy T. Combs (R)	Wilbur E. Young (R)	33R, 17D	76R, 24D	William E. Jenner (R)	Homer E. Capehart (R)	9R, 2D	Eisenhower/ Nixon (R) ✓
1958	Harold W. Handley (R)	Crawford F. Parker (R)	Edwin K. Steers (R)	Frank A. Lenning (R)	Aldolph L. Fossler (R)	Roy T. Combs (R)	Wilbur E. Young (R)	33R, 17D	76R, 24D	William E. Jenner (R)	Homer E. Capehart (R)	9R, 2D	Eisenhower/ Nixon (R) ✓
1959	Harold W. Handley (R)	Crawford F. Parker (R)	Edwin K. Steers (R)	John R. Walsh (D)	Jack A. Haymaker (D)	Albert A. Steinwedel (D)	William E. Wilson (D)	27R, 23D	79D, 21R	Vance Hartke (D)	Homer E. Capehart (R)	8D, 3R	Eisenhower/ Nixon (R) ✓
1960	Harold W. Handley (R)	Crawford F. Parker (R)	Edwin K. Steers (R)	John R. Walsh (D)	Jack A. Haymaker (D)	Albert A. Steinwedel (D)	William E. Wilson (D)	27R, 23D	79D, 21R	Vance Hartke (D)	Homer E. Capehart (R)	8D, 3R	Nixon/ Lodge (R) ✗
1961	Matthew E. Welsh (D)	Richard O. Ristine (R)	Edwin K. Steers (R)	Charles O. Hendricks (R)	Robert E. Hughes (R)	Dorothy Gardner (R)	William E. Wilson (D)	26D, 24R	66R, 34D	Vance Hartke (D)	Homer E. Capehart (R)	7R, 4D	Nixon/ Lodge (R) ✗
1962	Matthew E. Welsh (D)	Richard O. Ristine (R)	Edwin K. Steers (R)	Charles O. Hendricks (R)	Robert E. Hughes (R)	Dorothy Gardner (R)	William E. Wilson (D)	26D, 24R	66R, 34D	Vance Hartke (D)	Homer E. Capehart (R)	7R, 4D	Nixon/ Lodge (R) ✗
1963	Matthew E. Welsh (D)	Richard O. Ristine (R)	Edwin K. Steers (R)	Charles O. Hendricks (R)	Robert E. Hughes (R)	Dorothy Gardner (R)	William E. Wilson (D)	26R, 24D	56R, 44D	Vance Hartke (D)	Birch Bayh (D)	7R, 4D	Nixon/ Lodge (R) ✗
1964	Matthew E. Welsh (D)	Richard O. Ristine (R)	Edwin K. Steers (R)	Charles O. Hendricks (R)	Robert E. Hughes (R)	Dorothy Gardner (R)	William E. Wilson (D)	26R, 24D	56R, 44D	Vance Hartke (D)	Birch Bayh (D)	7R, 4D	Johnson/ Humphrey (D) ✓
1965	Roger D. Branigin (D)	Robert L. Rock (D)	John J. Dillon (D)	John D. Bottorff (D)	Jack L. New (D)	Mark L. France (D)	William E. Wilson (D)	35D, 15R	78D, 22R	Vance Hartke (D)	Birch Bayh (D)	6D, 5R	Johnson/ Humphrey (D) ✓
1966	Roger D. Branigin (D)	Robert L. Rock (D)	John J. Dillon (D)	John D. Bottorff (D)	Jack L. New (D)	Mark L. France (D)	William E. Wilson (D)	35D, 15R	78D, 22R	Vance Hartke (D)	Birch Bayh (D)	6D, 5R	Johnson/ Humphrey (D) ✓
1967	Roger D. Branigin (D)	Robert L. Rock (D)	John J. Dillon (D)	Edgar Whitcomb (R)	John Synder (R)	John P. Gallagher (R)	Richard D. Wells (R)	29D, 21R	66R, 34D	Vance Hartke (D)	Birch Bayh (D)	6R, 5D	Johnson/ Humphrey (D) ✓
1968	Roger D. Branigin (D)	Robert L. Rock (D)	John J. Dillon (D)	Edgar Whitcomb (R)	John Synder (R)	John P. Gallagher (R)	Richard D. Wells (R)	29D, 21R	66R, 34D	Vance Hartke (D)	Birch Bayh (D)	6R, 5D	Nixon/ Agnew (R) ✓
1969	Edgar Whitcomb (R)	Richard E. Folz (R)	Theodore L. Sendak (R)	William N. Salin (R)	John Synder (R)	Trudy S. Etherton (R)	Richard D. Wells (R)	35R, 15D	73R, 27D	Vance Hartke (D)	Birch Bayh (D)	7R, 4D	Nixon/ Agnew (R) ✓
1970	Edgar Whitcomb (R)	Richard E. Folz (R)	Theodore L. Sendak (R)	William N. Salin (R)	John Synder (R)	Trudy S. Etherton (R)	Richard D. Wells (R)	35R, 15D	73R, 27D	Vance Hartke (D)	Birch Bayh (D)	7R, 4D	Nixon/ Agnew (R) ✓
1971	Edgar Whitcomb (R)	Richard E. Folz (R)	Theodore L. Sendak (R)	Larry A. Conrad (D)	Jack L. New (D)	Mary Aikins Currie (D)	John J. Laughlin (D)	29R, 21D	54R, 46D	Vance Hartke (D)	Birch Bayh (D)	6R, 5D	Nixon/ Agnew (R) ✓
1972	Edgar Whitcomb (R)	Richard E. Folz (R)	Theodore L. Sendak (R)	Larry A. Conrad (D)	Jack L. New (D)	Mary Aikins Currie (D)	John J. Laughlin (D)	29R, 21D	54R, 46D	Vance Hartke (D)	Birch Bayh (D)	6R, 5D	Nixon/ Agnew (R) ✓
1973	Otis Bowen (R)	Robert D. Orr (R)	Theodore L. Sendak (R)	Larry A. Conrad (D)	Jack L. New (D)	Mary Aikins Currie (D)	Harold H. Negley (R)	29R, 21D	73R, 27D	Vance Hartke (D)	Birch Bayh (D)	7R, 4D	Nixon/ Agnew (R) ✓
1974	Otis Bowen (R)	Robert D. Orr (R)	Theodore L. Sendak (R)	Larry A. Conrad (D)	Jack L. New (D)	Mary Aikins Currie (D)	Harold H. Negley (R)	29R, 21D	73R, 27D	Vance Hartke (D)	Birch Bayh (D)	7R, 4D	Nixon/ Agnew (R) ✓
1975	Otis Bowen (R)	Robert D. Orr (R)	Theodore L. Sendak (R)	Larry A. Conrad (D)	Jack L. New (D)	Mary Aikins Currie (D)	Harold H. Negley (R)	27R, 23D	56D, 44R	Vance Hartke (D)	Birch Bayh (D)	9D, 2R	Nixon/ Agnew (R) ✓
1976	Otis Bowen (R)	Robert D. Orr (R)	Theodore L. Sendak (R)	Larry A. Conrad (D)	Jack L. New (D)	Mary Aikins Currie (D)	Harold H. Negley (R)	27R, 23D	56D, 44R	Vance Hartke (D)	Birch Bayh (D)	9D, 2R	Ford/ Dole (R) ✗
1977	Otis Bowen (R)	Robert D. Orr (R)	Theodore L. Sendak (R)	Larry A. Conrad (D)	Jack L. New (D)	Mary Aikins Currie (D)	Harold H. Negley (R)	28D, 22R	53R, 47D	Richard Lugar (R)	Birch Bayh (D)	8D, 3R	Ford/ Dole (R) ✗
1978	Otis Bowen (R)	Robert D. Orr (R)	Theodore L. Sendak (R)	Larry A. Conrad (D)	Jack L. New (D)	Mary Aikins Currie (D)	Harold H. Negley (R)	28D, 22R	53R, 47D	Richard Lugar (R)	Birch Bayh (D)	8D, 3R	Ford/ Dole (R) ✗
1979	Otis Bowen (R)	Robert D. Orr (R)	Theodore L. Sendak (R)	Edwin Simcox (R)	Julian L. Ridlen (R)	Charles D. Loos (R)	Harold H. Negley (R)	29R, 21D	54R, 46D	Richard Lugar (R)	Birch Bayh (D)	7D, 4R	Ford/ Dole (R) ✗
1980	Otis Bowen (R)	Robert D. Orr (R)	Theodore L. Sendak (R)	Edwin Simcox (R)	Julian L. Ridlen (R)	Charles D. Loos (R)	Harold H. Negley (R)	29R, 21D	54R, 46D	Richard Lugar (R)	Birch Bayh (D)	7D, 4R	Reagan/ Bush (R) ✓
1981	Robert D. Orr (R)	John Mutz (R)	Linley E. Pearson (R)	Edwin Simcox (R)	Julian L. Ridlen (R)	Charles D. Loos (R)	Harold H. Negley (R)	35R, 15D	63R, 37D	Richard Lugar (R)	Dan Quayle (R)	6D, 5R	Reagan/ Bush (R) ✓
1982	Robert D. Orr (R)	John Mutz (R)	Linley E. Pearson (R)	Edwin Simcox (R)	Julian L. Ridlen (R)	Charles D. Loos (R)	Harold H. Negley (R)	35R, 15D	63R, 37D	Richard Lugar (R)	Dan Quayle (R)	6D, 5R	Reagan/ Bush (R) ✓
1983	Robert D. Orr (R)	John Mutz (R)	Linley E. Pearson (R)	Edwin Simcox (R)	Julian L. Ridlen (R)	Otis E. Cox (D)	Harold H. Negley (R)	32R, 18D	57R, 43D	Richard Lugar (R)	Dan Quayle (R)	5D, 5R	Reagan/ Bush (R) ✓
1984	Robert D. Orr (R)	John Mutz (R)	Linley E. Pearson (R)	Edwin Simcox (R)	Julian L. Ridlen (R)	Otis E. Cox (D)	Harold H. Negley (R)	32R, 18D	57R, 43D	Richard Lugar (R)	Dan Quayle (R)	5D, 5R	Reagan/ Bush (R) ✓
1985	Robert D. Orr (R)	John Mutz (R)	Linley E. Pearson (R)	Edwin Simcox (R)	Julian L. Ridlen (R)	Otis E. Cox (D)	Harold H. Negley (R)	30R, 20D	63R, 37D	Richard Lugar (R)	Dan Quayle (R)	5D, 5R	Reagan/ Bush (R) ✓
1985	Robert D. Orr (R)	John Mutz (R)	Linley E. Pearson (R)	Edwin Simcox (R)	Julian L. Ridlen (R)	Otis E. Cox (D)	H. Dean Evans (R)	30R, 20D	63R, 37D	Richard Lugar (R)	Dan Quayle (R)	5D, 5R	Reagan/ Bush (R) ✓
1986	Robert D. Orr (R)	John Mutz (R)	Linley E. Pearson (R)	Edwin Simcox (R)	Julian L. Ridlen (R)	Otis E. Cox (D)	H. Dean Evans (R)	30R, 20D	63R, 37D	Richard Lugar (R)	Dan Quayle (R)	5D, 5R	Reagan/ Bush (R) ✓
1987	Robert D. Orr (R)	John Mutz (R)	Linley E. Pearson (R)	Evan Bayh (D)	Majorie H. O'Laughlin (R)	Sue Anne Gilroy (R)	H. Dean Evans (R)	30R, 20D	52R, 48D	Richard Lugar (R)	Dan Quayle (R)	6D, 4R	Reagan/ Bush (R) ✓
1988	Robert D. Orr (R)	John Mutz (R)	Linley E. Pearson (R)	Evan Bayh (D)	Majorie H. O'Laughlin (R)	Sue Anne Gilroy (R)	H. Dean Evans (R)	30R, 20D	52R, 48D	Richard Lugar (R)	Dan Quayle (R)	6D, 4R	Bush/ Quayle (R) ✓
1989	Evan Bayh (D)	Frank O'Bannon (D)	Linley E. Pearson (R)	Joe Hogsett (D)	Majorie H. O'Laughlin (R)	Sue Anne Gilroy (R)	H. Dean Evans (R)	26R, 24D	50D, 50R (Note: With a split chamber, the House had a Democratic and a Republican co-Speaker.)	Richard Lugar (R)	Dan Coats (R)	7D, 3R	Bush/ Quayle (R) ✓
1990	Evan Bayh (D)	Frank O'Bannon (D)	Linley E. Pearson (R)	Joe Hogsett (D)	Majorie H. O'Laughlin (R)	Sue Anne Gilroy (R)	H. Dean Evans (R)	26R, 24D	50D, 50R	Richard Lugar (R)	Dan Coats (R)	7D, 3R	Bush/ Quayle (R) ✓
1991	Evan Bayh (D)	Frank O'Bannon (D)	Linley E. Pearson (R)	Joe Hogsett (D)	Majorie H. O'Laughlin (R)	Sue Anne Gilroy (R)	H. Dean Evans (R)	26R, 24D	52D, 48R	Richard Lugar (R)	Dan Coats (R)	8D, 2R	Bush/ Quayle (R) ✓
1992	Evan Bayh (D)	Frank O'Bannon (D)	Linley E. Pearson (R)	Joe Hogsett (D)	Majorie H. O'Laughlin (R)	Sue Anne Gilroy (R)	H. Dean Evans (R)	26R, 24D	52D, 48R	Richard Lugar (R)	Dan Coats (R)	8D, 2R	Bush/ Quayle (R) ✗
1993	Evan Bayh (D)	Frank O'Bannon (D)	Pamela Carter (D)	Joe Hogsett (D)	Majorie H. O'Laughlin (R)	Sue Anne Gilroy (R)	Suellen Reed (R)	28R, 22D	55D, 45R	Richard Lugar (R)	Dan Coats (R)	7D, 3R	Bush/ Quayle (R) ✗
1994	Evan Bayh (D)	Frank O'Bannon (D)	Pamela Carter (D)	Joe Hogsett (D)	Majorie H. O'Laughlin (R)	Sue Anne Gilroy (R)	Suellen Reed (R)	28R, 22D	55D, 45R	Richard Lugar (R)	Dan Coats (R)	7D, 3R	Bush/ Quayle (R) ✗
1995	Evan Bayh (D)	Frank O'Bannon (D)	Pamela Carter (D)	Sue Anne Gilroy (R)	Joyce Brinkman (R)	Morris Wooden (R)	Suellen Reed (R)	30R, 20D	56R, 44D	Richard Lugar (R)	Dan Coats (R)	6R, 4D	Bush/ Quayle (R) ✗
1996	Evan Bayh (D)	Frank O'Bannon (D)	Pamela Carter (D)	Sue Anne Gilroy (R)	Joyce Brinkman (R)	Morris Wooden (R)	Suellen Reed (R)	30R, 20D	56R, 44D	Richard Lugar (R)	Dan Coats (R)	6R, 4D	Dole/ Kemp (R) ✗
1997	Frank O'Bannon (D)	Joe Kernan (D)	Jeff Modisett (D)	Sue Anne Gilroy (R)	Joyce Brinkman (R)	Morris Wooden (R)	Suellen Reed (R)	31R, 19D	50D, 50R (Note: Due to a law passed in 1995, in the occurrence of a 50-50 chamber, the party of the governor controls the Speakership.)	Richard Lugar (R)	Dan Coats (R)	6R, 4D	Dole/ Kemp (R) ✗
1998	Frank O'Bannon (D)	Joe Kernan (D)	Jeff Modisett (D)	Sue Anne Gilroy (R)	Joyce Brinkman (R)	Morris Wooden (R)	Suellen Reed (R)	31R, 19D	50D, 50R	Richard Lugar (R)	Evan Bayh (D)	6R, 4D	Dole/ Kemp (R) ✗
1999	Frank O'Bannon (D)	Joe Kernan (D)	Jeff Modisett (D)	Sue Anne Gilroy (R)	Tim Berry (R)	Connie Kay Nass (R)	Suellen Reed (R)	31R, 19D	53D, 47R	Richard Lugar (R)	Evan Bayh (D)	6R, 4D	Dole/ Kemp (R) ✗
2000	Frank O'Bannon (D)	Joe Kernan (D)	Karen Freeman-Wilson (D)	Sue Anne Gilroy (R)	Tim Berry (R)	Connie Kay Nass (R)	Suellen Reed (R)	31R, 19D	53D, 47R	Richard Lugar (R)	Evan Bayh (D)	6R, 4D	Bush/ Cheney (R) ✓
2001	Frank O'Bannon (D)	Joe Kernan (D)	Steve Carter (R)	Sue Anne Gilroy (R)	Tim Berry (R)	Connie Kay Nass (R)	Suellen Reed (R)	32R, 18D	53D, 47R	Richard Lugar (R)	Evan Bayh (D)	6R, 4D	Bush/ Cheney (R) ✓
2002	Frank O'Bannon (D)	Joe Kernan (D)	Steve Carter (R)	Sue Anne Gilroy (R)	Tim Berry (R)	Connie Kay Nass (R)	Suellen Reed (R)	32R, 18D	53D, 47R	Richard Lugar (R)	Evan Bayh (D)	6R, 4D	Bush/ Cheney (R) ✓
2003	Frank O'Bannon (D)	Joe Kernan (D)	Steve Carter (R)	Todd Rokita (R)	Tim Berry (R)	Connie Kay Nass (R)	Suellen Reed (R)	32R, 18D	51D, 49R	Richard Lugar (R)	Evan Bayh (D)	6R, 3D	Bush/ Cheney (R) ✓
2003	Joe Kernan (D)	Kathy Davis (D)	Steve Carter (R)	Todd Rokita (R)	Tim Berry (R)	Connie Kay Nass (R)	Suellen Reed (R)	32R, 18D	51D, 49R	Richard Lugar (R)	Evan Bayh (D)	6R, 3D	Bush/ Cheney (R) ✓
2004	Joe Kernan (D)	Kathy Davis (D)	Steve Carter (R)	Todd Rokita (R)	Tim Berry (R)	Connie Kay Nass (R)	Suellen Reed (R)	32R, 18D	51D, 49R	Richard Lugar (R)	Evan Bayh (D)	6R, 3D	Bush/ Cheney (R) ✓
2005	Mitch Daniels (R)	Becky Skillman (R)	Steve Carter (R)	Todd Rokita (R)	Tim Berry (R)	Connie Kay Nass (R)	Suellen Reed (R)	33R, 17D	52R, 48D	Richard Lugar (R)	Evan Bayh (D)	7R, 2D	Bush/ Cheney (R) ✓
2006	Mitch Daniels (R)	Becky Skillman (R)	Steve Carter (R)	Todd Rokita (R)	Tim Berry (R)	Connie Kay Nass (R)	Suellen Reed (R)	33R, 17D	52R, 48D	Richard Lugar (R)	Evan Bayh (D)	7R, 2D	Bush/ Cheney (R) ✓
2007	Mitch Daniels (R)	Becky Skillman (R)	Steve Carter (R)	Todd Rokita (R)	Richard Mourdock (R)	Tim Berry (R)	Suellen Reed (R)	33R, 17D	51D, 49R	Richard Lugar (R)	Evan Bayh (D)	5D, 4R	Bush/ Cheney (R) ✓
2008	Mitch Daniels (R)	Becky Skillman (R)	Steve Carter (R)	Todd Rokita (R)	Richard Mourdock (R)	Tim Berry (R)	Suellen Reed (R)	33R, 17D	51D, 49R	Richard Lugar (R)	Evan Bayh (D)	5D, 4R	Obama/ Biden (D) ✓
2009	Mitch Daniels (R)	Becky Skillman (R)	Greg Zoeller (R)	Todd Rokita (R)	Richard Mourdock (R)	Tim Berry (R)	Tony Bennett (R)	33R, 17D	52D, 48R	Richard Lugar (R)	Evan Bayh (D)	5D, 4R	Obama/ Biden (D) ✓
2010	Mitch Daniels (R)	Becky Skillman (R)	Greg Zoeller (R)	Todd Rokita (R)	Richard Mourdock (R)	Tim Berry (R)	Tony Bennett (R)	33R, 17D	52D, 48R	Richard Lugar (R)	Evan Bayh (D)	5D, 4R	Obama/ Biden (D) ✓
2011	Mitch Daniels (R)	Becky Skillman (R)	Greg Zoeller (R)	Charles P. White (R) (Note: Automatically removed from office due to felony conviction)	Richard Mourdock (R)	Tim Berry (R)	Tony Bennett (R)	37R, 13D	60R, 40D	Richard Lugar (R)	Dan Coats (R)	6R, 3D	Obama/ Biden (D) ✓
2012	Mitch Daniels (R)	Becky Skillman (R)	Greg Zoeller (R)	Connie Lawson (R) (Note: Appointed to fill a vacancy.) (Note: Resigned)	Richard Mourdock (R)	Tim Berry (R)	Tony Bennett (R)	37R, 13D	60R, 40D	Richard Lugar (R)	Dan Coats (R)	6R, 3D	Romney/ Ryan (R) ✗
2013	Mike Pence (R)	Sue Ellspermann (R)	Greg Zoeller (R)	Connie Lawson (R)	Richard Mourdock (R)	Tim Berry (R)	Glenda Ritz (D)	37R, 13D	69R, 31D	Joe Donnelly (D)	Dan Coats (R)	7R, 2D	Romney/ Ryan (R) ✗
2014	Mike Pence (R)	Sue Ellspermann (R)	Greg Zoeller (R)	Connie Lawson (R)	Richard Mourdock (R)	Suzanne Crouch (R)	Glenda Ritz (D)	37R, 13D	69R, 31D	Joe Donnelly (D)	Dan Coats (R)	7R, 2D	Romney/ Ryan (R) ✗
2015	Mike Pence (R)	Sue Ellspermann (R)	Greg Zoeller (R)	Connie Lawson (R)	Kelly Mitchell (R)	Suzanne Crouch (R)	Glenda Ritz (D)	40R, 10D	71R, 29D	Joe Donnelly (D)	Dan Coats (R)	7R, 2D	Romney/ Ryan (R) ✗
2016	Mike Pence (R)	Eric Holcomb (R)	Greg Zoeller (R)	Connie Lawson (R)	Kelly Mitchell (R)	Suzanne Crouch (R)	Glenda Ritz (D)	40R, 10D	71R, 29D	Joe Donnelly (D)	Dan Coats (R)	7R, 2D	Trump/ Pence (R) ✓
2017	Eric Holcomb (R)	Suzanne Crouch (R)	Curtis Hill (R)	Connie Lawson (R)	Kelly Mitchell (R)	Tera Klutz (R)	Jennifer; McCormick (R)	41R, 9D	70R, 30D	Joe Donnelly (D)	Todd Young (R)	7R, 2D	Trump/ Pence (R) ✓
2018	Eric Holcomb (R)	Suzanne Crouch (R)	Curtis Hill (R)	Connie Lawson (R)	Kelly Mitchell (R)	Tera Klutz (R)	Jennifer; McCormick (R)	41R, 9D	70R, 30D	Joe Donnelly (D)	Todd Young (R)	7R, 2D	Trump/ Pence (R) ✓
2019	Eric Holcomb (R)	Suzanne Crouch (R)	Curtis Hill (R)	Connie Lawson (R)	Kelly Mitchell (R)	Tera Klutz (R)	Jennifer; McCormick (R)	40R, 10D	67R, 33D	Mike Braun (R)	Todd Young (R)	7R, 2D	Trump/ Pence (R) ✓
2020	Eric Holcomb (R)	Suzanne Crouch (R)	Curtis Hill (R)	Connie Lawson (R)	Kelly Mitchell (R)	Tera Klutz (R)	Jennifer; McCormick (R)	40R, 10D	67R, 33D	Mike Braun (R)	Todd Young (R)	7R, 2D	Trump/ Pence (R) ✗
2021	Eric Holcomb (R)	Suzanne Crouch (R)	Todd Rokita (R)	Holli Sullivan (R)	Kelly Mitchell (R)	Tera Klutz (R)	Office abolished (Note: Office replaced with appointed Secretary of Education.)	39R, 11D	71R, 29D	Mike Braun (R)	Todd Young (R)	7R, 2D	Trump/ Pence (R) ✗
2022	Eric Holcomb (R)	Suzanne Crouch (R)	Todd Rokita (R)	Holli Sullivan (R)	Kelly Mitchell (R)	Tera Klutz (R)	Office abolished	39R, 11D	71R, 29D	Mike Braun (R)	Todd Young (R)	7R, 2D	Trump/ Pence (R) ✗
2023	Eric Holcomb (R)	Suzanne Crouch (R)	Todd Rokita (R)	Diego Morales (R)	Daniel Elliott (R)	Tera Klutz (R)	Office abolished	40R, 10D	70R, 30D	Mike Braun (R)	Todd Young (R)	7R, 2D	Trump/ Pence (R) ✗
2024	Eric Holcomb (R)	Suzanne Crouch (R)	Todd Rokita (R)	Diego Morales (R)	Daniel Elliott (R)	Elise Nieshalla (R)	Office abolished	40R, 10D	70R, 30D	Mike Braun (R)	Todd Young (R)	7R, 2D	Trump/ Vance (R) ✓

== 2025–present ==
Year	Executive offices						General Assembly		United States Congress			Electoral votes
Year	Governor	Lt. Governor	Attorney General	Secretary of State	Treasurer	Comptroller	State Senate	State House	U.S. Senator (Class I)	U.S. Senator (Class III)	U.S. House	Electoral votes
2025	Mike Braun (R)	Micah Beckwith (R)	Todd Rokita (R)	Diego Morales (R)	Daniel Elliott (R)	Elise Nieshalla (R)	40R, 10D	70R, 30D	Jim Banks (R)	Todd Young (R)	7R, 2D	Trump/ Vance (R) ✓
2026	Mike Braun (R)	Micah Beckwith (R)	Todd Rokita (R)	Diego Morales (R)	Daniel Elliott (R)	Elise Nieshalla (R)	40R, 10D	70R, 30D	Jim Banks (R)	Todd Young (R)	7R, 2D	Trump/ Vance (R) ✓
2027	Mike Braun (R)	Micah Beckwith (R)	Todd Rokita (R)	Beau Bayh (D)	Daniel Elliott (R)	Jessica Bailey (D)	34R, 15D	54R, 46D	Jim Banks (R)	Todd Young (R)	6R, 3D	Trump/ Vance (R) ✓

Key to party colors and abbreviations for members of the U.S. Congress and other politicians or officials
Alaskan Independence (AKIP) Know Nothing (KN) American Labor (AL) Anti-Jacksonian (Anti-J); National Republican (NR) Anti-Administration (AA) Anti-Masonic (Anti-M) Conservative (Con) Covenant (Cov)	Democratic (D) Democratic–Farmer–Labor (DFL) Democratic–NPL (D-NPL) Dixiecrat (Dix), States' Rights (SR) Democratic-Republican (DR) Farmer–Labor (FL) Federalist (F); Pro-Administration (PA)	Free Soil (FS) Fusion (Fus) Greenback (GB) Independence (IPM) Jacksonian (J) Liberal (Lib) Libertarian (L) National Union (NU)	Nonpartisan League (NPL) Nullifier (N) Opposition Northern (O); Opposition Southern (O) Populist (Pop) Progressive (Prog) Prohibition (Proh) Readjuster (Rea)	Republican (R) Silver (Sv) Silver Republican (SvR) Socialist (Soc) Union (U) Unconditional Union (UU) Vermont Progressive (VP) Whig (W)	Independent (I) Nonpartisan (NP)

== See also ==
- Politics of Indiana
- Elections in Indiana
- Government of Indiana
- Indiana General Assembly
