= Bobby Hughes =

Bobby Hughes may refer to:

- Bobby Hughes (baseball) (born 1971), former Major League Baseball catcher
- Bobby Hughes (footballer) (1892–1955), English football outside forward

== See also ==
- Robert Hughes (disambiguation)
- Bob Hughes, a fictional character on the American soap opera As the World Turns
