= Robert Hughes =

Robert Hughes may refer to:

== Arts and entertainment ==
- Robert Hughes (poet) (1744–1785), Welsh poet
- Robert Ball Hughes (1804–1868), British-American sculptor
- Robert Hughes (composer, born 1912) (1912–2007), Scots-Australian composer
- Robert Earl Hughes (1926–1958), American one-time "World's Heaviest Human" according to the Guinness Book of Records
- Robert Hughes (American composer) (1933–2022), San Francisco Bay Area composer
- Robert Alwyn Hughes (1935–2020), Welsh artist
- Robert Hughes (critic) (1938–2012), Australian art critic, writer and broadcaster
- Robert Hughes (actor) (born 1948), Australian former actor
- Robert Don Hughes (1949–2023), American writer
- Robert F. Hughes (born 1961), American television director
- Robert Vincent Hughes, also known as Vincent (music producer)

== Politics ==
- Robert H. Hughes (1925–2017), American politician in the Texas House of Representatives
- Robert Hughes, Baron Hughes of Woodside (1932–2022), British Labour politician, MP for Aberdeen North
- Robert Hughes (Conservative politician) (born 1951), British Conservative politician, MP for Harrow West

== Sports ==
- Bobby Hughes (footballer) (1892–1955), English football outside forward
- Robert Hughes (basketball) (1928–2024), all-time winningest high school boys basketball coach
- Robert Hughes (swimmer) (1930–2012), American Olympic water polo player and swimmer
- Judge Hughes (Robert E. Hughes, 1944–2013), American football player and college coach
- Bob Hughes (athlete) (born 1947), British Olympic athlete
- Robert Hughes (darts player) (born 1966), Welsh darts player
- Bobby Hughes (baseball) (born 1971), former Major League Baseball catcher
- Robert Hughes (cricketer) (born 1973), former English cricketer
- Robert Hughes (footballer) (born 1986), English footballer at St Neots Town
- Robert Hughes (American football) (born 1989), American football running back

== Other ==
- Robert Hughes (Royal Navy officer, died 1729) (died 1729), British admiral
- Robert S. Hughes (died 1900), American, president of Rogers Locomotive and Machine Works
- Robert William Hughes (1821–1901), American newspaperman, lawyer, and Virginia judge
- Robert Patterson Hughes (1839–1909), American military commander
- Robert Hughes (conservationist) (1847–1935), New Zealand lawyer and conservationist
- Robert M. Hughes (1855–1940), American lawyer
- Robert Arthur Hughes (1910–1996), British medical missionary
- Robert Roland Hughes (1911–1991), British neurologist
- Robert E. Hughes (1924–2017), American professor of physical chemistry

== Fictional characters ==
- Bob Hughes, American fictional soap opera character from As the World Turns
- Bob Hughes, television series character; see Neighbours characters introduced in 1988

== See also ==
- Hughes (surname)
