= 2022 Indiana State Treasurer election =

- November 8, 2022

Nominee	Daniel Elliott	Jessica McClellan
Party	Republican	Democratic
Popular vote	1,121,158	720,778
Percentage	60.87%	39.13%
- Elliott: 50–60% 60–70% 70–80% 80–90% McClellan: 50–60% 60–70%
State Treasurer before election
Kelly Mitchell
Republican
Elected State Treasurer
Daniel Elliott
Republican

The 2022 Indiana State Treasurer election took place on November 8, 2022, to elect the next Indiana State Treasurer. Incumbent Republican Party Treasurer Kelly Mitchell was term-limited and could not seek re-election.

== Republican convention ==
=== Candidates ===
==== Nominee ====
- Daniel Elliott, chair of the Morgan County Republican Party

==== Eliminated at convention ====
- Lana Keesling, Fort Wayne city clerk
- Elise Nieshalla, Boone County council president
- Pete Seat, former Indiana Republican Party spokesman

==== Withdrew ====
- Suzie Jaworowski, former chief of staff of the Office of Nuclear Energy (ran for state representative)

=== Endorsements ===
Daniel Elliot

State senators

- Rodric Bray, president pro tempore of the Indiana Senate
- Mike Gaskill, state senator from the 26th district
- Randy Head, former state senator from the 18th district
Pete Seat
- Ethan Manning, state representative from the 23rd district (2018–present)

== Democratic convention ==
=== Candidates ===
==== Nominee ====
- Jessica McClellan, Monroe County treasurer

== General election ==
=== Results ===
2022 Indiana State Treasurer election
Party	Candidate	Votes	%	±%
Republican	Daniel Elliott	1,121,158	60.87%	+2.24%
Democratic	Jessica McClellan	720,778	39.13%	−2.24%
Total votes		1,841,936	100.00%	N/A
Republican hold				

==== By county ====
County	Daniel Elliott Republican		Jessica McClellan Democratic	
County	Votes	%	Votes	%
Adams	6,916	77.8%	1,974	22.2%
Allen	59,986	59.6%	40,594	40.4%
Bartholomew	14,502	65.1%	7,771	34.9%
Benton	1,972	80.0%	493	20.0%
Blackford	2,487	74.3%	860	25.7%
Boone	15,246	62.8%	9,141	37.2%
Brown	4,040	64.7%	2,209	35.3%
Carroll	4,778	77.0%	1,424	23.0%
Cass	6,251	72.9%	2,318	27.1%
Clark	22,006	61.5%	13,793	38.5%
Clay	5,888	77.8%	1,677	22.2%
Clinton	5,567	76.9%	1,669	23.1%
Crawford	2,469	69.3%	1,094	30.7%
Daviess	5,779	83.6%	1,135	16.4%
Dearborn	11,532	80.8%	2,743	19.2%
Decatur	6,418	80.7%	1,533	19.3%
DeKalb	8,645	74.7%	2,933	25.3%
Delaware	17,513	58.7%	12,305	41.3%
Dubois	9,615	71.4%	3,855	28.6%
Elkhart	31,457	70.6%	13,074	29.4%
Fayette	4,729	77.3%	1,392	22.7%
Floyd	15,806	59.2%	10,882	40.8%
Fountain	3,999	80.4%	976	19.6%
Franklin	5,994	81.9%	1,322	18.1%
Fulton	4,188	76.4%	1,297	23.6%
Gibson	7,508	74.9%	2,519	25.1%
Grant	11,525	73.6%	4,129	26.4%
Greene	7,045	75.5%	2,292	24.5%
Hamilton	75,561	59.1%	52,363	40.9%
Hancock	16,888	71.3%	6,787	28.7%
Harrison	9,986	73.1%	3,668	26.9%
Hendricks	31,703	65.7%	16,544	34.3%
Henry	9,927	73.9%	3,501	26.1%
Howard	16,987	68.9%	7,668	31.1%
Huntington	8,557	76.1%	2,691	23.9%
Jackson	8,642	77.9%	2,454	22.1%
Jasper	7,229	78.5%	1,980	21.5%
Jay	4,063	75.7%	1,304	24.3%
Jefferson	6,417	66.2%	3,274	33.8%
Jennings	6,043	77.5%	1,750	22.5%
Johnson	31,229	70.1%	13,297	29.9%
Knox	7,380	73.9%	2,605	26.1%
Kosciusko	18,043	80.5%	4,381	19.5%
LaGrange	5,223	79.8%	1,324	20.2%
Lake	60,489	45.8%	71,475	54.2%
LaPorte	17,667	55.9%	13,965	44.1%
Lawrence	9,820	77.9%	2,778	22.1%
Madison	22,412	63.0%	13,186	37.0%
Marion	84,799	38.1%	137,724	61.9%
Marshall	9,452	74.7%	3,199	25.3%
Martin	2,608	76.6%	798	23.4%
Miami	6,638	78.4%	1,827	21.6%
Monroe	14,633	36.9%	25,038	63.1%
Montgomery	7,419	77.1%	2,206	22.9%
Morgan	16,467	78.2%	4,584	21.8%
Newton	3,104	78.3%	860	21.7%
Noble	8,823	77.4%	2,583	22.6%
Ohio	1,495	76.9%	450	23.1%
Orange	4,098	76.6%	1,255	23.4%
Owen	4,518	74.1%	1,580	25.9%
Parke	3,471	78.1%	974	21.9%
Perry	3,664	59.5%	2,492	40.5%
Pike	2,744	75.6%	887	24.4%
Porter	31,559	54.6%	26,190	45.4%
Posey	6,102	72.2%	2,352	27.8%
Pulaski	2,856	77.5%	831	22.5%
Putnam	7,499	76.1%	2,359	23.9%
Randolph	5,301	77.6%	1,530	22.4%
Ripley	6,731	80.8%	1,600	19.2%
Rush	3,816	79.3%	998	20.7%
St. Joseph	36,474	51.4%	34,451	48.6%
Scott	4,468	66.7%	2,226	33.3%
Shelby	8,621	75.5%	2,799	24.5%
Spencer	5,210	69.3%	2,307	30.7%
Starke	4,908	72.4%	1,870	27.6%
Steuben	7,004	73.1%	2,576	26.9%
Sullivan	4,386	70.7%	1,814	29.3%
Switzerland	1,941	73.9%	685	26.1%
Tippecanoe	20,105	52.5%	18,210	47.5%
Tipton	3,892	75.3%	1,274	24.7%
Union	1,905	77.9%	540	22.1%
Vanderburgh	26,391	57.6%	19,417	42.4%
Vermillion	3,247	65.3%	1,728	34.7%
Vigo	14,780	55.8%	11,689	44.2%
Wabash	7,546	77.9%	2,137	22.1%
Warren	2,225	79.6%	569	20.4%
Warrick	13,435	67.4%	6,499	32.6%
Washington	6,062	76.8%	1,830	23.2%
Wayne	11,088	67.4%	5,355	32.6%
Wells	7,309	80.8%	1,741	19.2%
White	5,047	75.3%	1,658	24.7%
Whitley	8,786	77.1%	2,607	22.9%

Counties that flipped from Democratic to Republican

- LaPorte (largest city: Michigan City)
- St. Joseph (largest municipality: South Bend)

==== By congressional district ====
Elliott won seven of nine congressional districts.

District	Elliott	McClellan	Representative
1st	49%	51%	Frank J. Mrvan
2nd	66%	34%	Rudy Yakym
3rd	68%	32%	Jim Banks
4th	68%	32%	Jim Baird
5th	62%	38%	Victoria Spartz
6th	68%	32%	Greg Pence
7th	32%	68%	André Carson
8th	67%	33%	Larry Bucshon
9th	65%	35%	Trey Hollingsworth (117th Congress)
9th	65%	35%	Erin Houchin (118th Congress)
