= 2026 Indiana State Treasurer election =

- November 3, 2026

Candidate	Daniel Elliott	Coumba Kebe
Party	Republican	Democratic
Popular vote	980,239	941,117
Percentage	51.02%	48.98%
- Elliot: 50–60% 60–70% 70–80% Kebe: 50–60% 60–70% 70–80%
State Treasurer before election
Daniel Elliott
Republican
Elected State Treasurer
Daniel Elliott
Republican

The 2026 Indiana State Treasurer election was held on November 3, 2026, to elect the Indiana State Treasurer to a four-year term. Nominees for state treasurer are selected at party conventions rather than primary elections. Incumbent Republican treasurer Daniel Elliott won reelection, narrowly defeating Coumba Kebe. This was the only statewide victory for Republicans in Indiana in the 2026 elections.

== Republican convention ==
=== Candidates ===
==== Nominee ====
- Daniel Elliott, incumbent treasurer

== Democratic convention ==
=== Candidates ===
==== Nominee ====
- Coumba Kebe, public health executive and candidate for House District 29 in 2026

== General election ==
=== Post-convention endorsements ===
Coumba Kebe (D)

Labor unions

- Indiana State AFL-CIO

=== Polling ===
Poll source	Date(s) administered	Sample size (Note: Key: A – all adults RV – registered voters LV – likely voters V – unclear)	Margin of error	Daniel Elliott (R)	Coumba Kebe (D)	Undecided
Quantus Insights (R)	October 19–21, 2026	757 (LV)	± 3.8%	44%	36%	14%
Bellwether Research	October 8–11, 2026	896 (LV)	± 3.5%	43%	38%	19%

=== Results ===
2026 Indiana State Treasurer election
Party	Candidate	Votes	%	±%
Republican	Daniel Elliott (incumbent)	979,897	51.01	–9.86
Democratic	Coumba Kebe	940,964	49.99	+9.86
Total votes		1,920,861	100.0	
