= Dr. H. Gordon Roberts Hospital, Shillong =

- Christian Hospital

Geography
- Location: Shillong, North East of India, Meghalaya, India
- Coordinates: 25.587857°N 91.875140°E

Organisation
- Type: Multi-Specialty Hospital and School of Nursing

Services
- Beds: 350

History
- Founded: 25 March 1922

Links
- Website: www.drhgrobertshospital.com
- Lists: Hospitals in India

Dr. H. Gordon Roberts Hospital, Shillong, or KJP Hospital (Khasi Jaintia Presbyterian Hospital), is one of the oldest medical centres in Meghalaya. This Christian institution was founded by Dr. Hughes Gordon Roberts and is located in the city of Shillong in the north east of India.

== History ==
Dr. H. Gordon Roberts was the founder of the hospital. He arrived in Shillong in 1913 and started work with a small dispensary at Mission Compound near the KJP Girls’ High School. He started the construction of the building of the hospital in 1915 with the permission given by the government of Assam. The work was started on the edge of the town, in the part called Jaiaw where it stands to this date. The hospital was officially opened on the 25 March 1922 by the then Governor of Assam, Sir William Marris, as a 90-bed hospital and was known as the Khasi Hills Welsh Mission Hospital. Roberts was the founder and the first chief medical officer of the hospital which is still known as "Dr. Roberts Hospital" by many people.

For many years, the hospital was one of the few institutions in the north east of India in which major surgery could be performed. Dr. R. A. Hughes, a very qualified surgeon with additional training in tropical medicine, came to Shillong in March 1939 and he became senior medical officer in 1942 on the retirement of Roberts. He expanded the hospital's accommodation, introduced the latest operating techniques, started the first blood bank in Shillong, introduced the latest anesthetic machine (EMO) and other facilities like the boiler generating steam for the hospital. He was assisted by Khasi doctors such as Dr. Drin Sing Hynniewta who joined from 1928 in the Department of O&G and Dr. (Miss) O. Roy as an anaesthetist. From time to time, missionary doctors came to help Hughes; among them were Dr. Stanley Russell and Dr. P.A. Shave.

With the departure of the missionaries, when Hughes retired in 1969 the responsibility of running the hospital fell passed to the Khasi Jaintia Presbyterian Synod and Dr. E.C. Synkon was appointed as senior medical officer, Dr. S. P. Sen. Gupta as the surgeon superintendent and Mr. O. Gilbert as the secretary of the hospital. After a brief spell as surgeon, Sen. Gupta left in 1972 and Gilbert retired due to ill health.

In 1981, at the KJP Synod meeting held at Mawlai Phudmawri once again changed the name of the hospital to "The Khasi and Jaintia Presbyterian Synod Hospital, Jaiaw Shillong". Dr. P. Lamare took over as the medical superintendent and secretary of the managing committee of the hospital.

After the Lamare's retirement in 1998, Dr. (Mrs.) K. Ropmay was appointed as acting medical superintendent until the end of 2000 when Dr. Sandi Syiem MD was appointed as the medical superintendent on honorary basis until January 2006 when to Dr. David D. Tariang became the new medical superintendent.

== See also ==
- Council of Christian Hospitals
