= Grace Urbahns =

Politician from Indiana

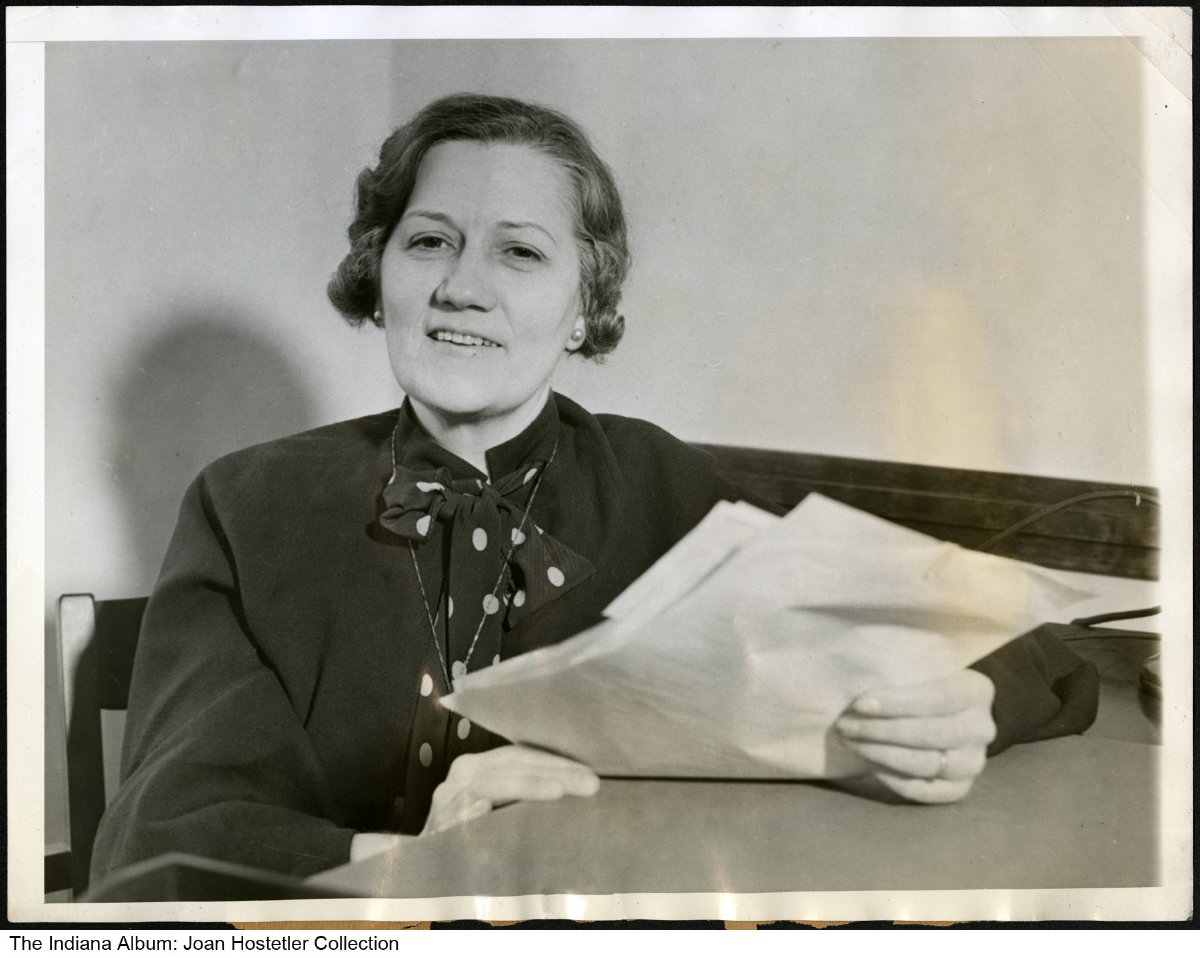

33rd Treasurer of Indiana
- In office January 22, 1926 – February 10, 1931
- Governor: Edward L. Jackson; Harry G. Leslie
- Preceded by: Bernhardt H. Urbahns
- Succeeded by: William Storen

Personal details
- Born: August 1, 1886 Jasper County, Indiana
- Died: November 13, 1969 (aged 83) Fort Wayne, Indiana
- Resting place: Crown Hill Cemetery and Arboretum, Section 62, Lot 529
- Party: Republican
- Spouses: Bernhardt H. Urbahns (m. 1915) Frank S. Reynolds (m. 1929)
- Education: Valparaiso University
- Profession: Teacher

Grace Urbahns (1886 – 13 November 1968) became the 33rd Treasurer of State in Indiana from January 1926 to February 1931. This made her the first woman to serve in a state-level executive office in Indiana. Among all the states, she was the only woman serving as Treasurer of State. Grace was active in the Republican Party and served as National Committeewoman from Indiana.

== Political life ==
Grace's husband Bernhardt H. Urbahns was elected Treasurer of State of Indiana and had only served one year of his term when he died January 21, 1926, after an operation for a kidney infection. Governor Ed Jackson had made a promise to Ben shortly before he went to the hospital that he would name Grace as his successor to Treasurer of State if anything happened to him. Grace was appointed by the Governor to the office on January 26, 1926. The appointment was announced in the newspapers the day after her husband's death. The term ended February 10, 1927.

For the election of November 1926, she was held in such high esteem by the men and women of the Republican Party that no one considered opposing her nomination to treasurer. At that time, no other political party had elected any women to this high of office.

The re-election campaign provided her a great deal of experience in giving speeches which she gave in nearly every county. The result was that she received a majority of the votes. She received over 5000 of the near 6000 votes in her home county of Porter. She also received more votes in her opponent's home county.

Her re-election in 1928 was won by about 110,000 votes.

She was twice re-elected to the office. Each term being 2 years in length.

After her second marriage, she moved to Cambridge City and became the first president of Wayne County Women's Republican Club.

After leaving the office of treasurer, she became a national committeewoman of the Republican Party and served through the presidential election of 1936, 1940, and 1944. She was the director of Women's Activities of the Western Division of the Republican Party during the presidential election of 1936. During 1940 and 1944 she was a national committee assistant in New York City and Washington D.C.

== Personal life ==
Grace Banta was born in Jasper County, Indiana. She received her early education in Chicago schools and graduated from Valparaiso University (1906-1908). She taught in public schools in Porter County, Indiana, and then later in Montana.

She married Bernhardt H. Urbahns in 1915 in Valparaiso, Indiana. Ben was the Porter County treasurer. She gained knowledge of business and financing from assisting her husband with his work.

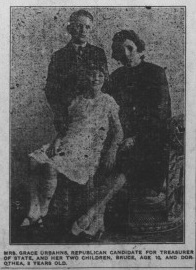
Mrs. Grace Urbahns, Republican candidate for Treasurer of State, and her two children Bruce, age 10, and Dorothea, 8 years old.

Grace and Bernhardt had two children, John Bruce Urbahns and Dorothea Urbahns Fruchtenicht.

"Mother takes care of the children, but we go out together often, and I do not feel that I have been any less the mother since I started to work. My children are proud of my position and realize that I am taking 'Daddie's place.' One day Dorothea came in and said, 'Mother the kids say that you are a great woman and will be written up in history'." Grace Urbahns in 1927.

Grace married Frank S. Reynolds on September 14, 1929, at the Presbyterian Church in Indianapolis. Frank was the president of the Rushville National Bank and head of the Reynolds Manufacturing Company which he founded in Rushville in 1901. He was a member of the state board of education. He resided on Capitol Hill just east of Cambridge City, Indiana. They met at a political meeting in Rushville where Grace was a speaker.

She moved to Cambridge City after her marriage. Grace and Frank moved to Fort Wayne in 1960 when he sold his business.

She was a member of the Presbyterian Church and was active in civic work in Indianapolis after her time as treasurer.

After her time as state treasurer, she became very active with the Republican Party on a national level. This included working to rally women voters nationwide.

She died November 13, 1968, at Lutheran Hospital in Fort Wayne, Indiana, at the age of 82. She is buried in Crown Hill Cemetery in Indianapolis, Indiana.
