= Daniel Elliott (Indiana politician) =

American politician

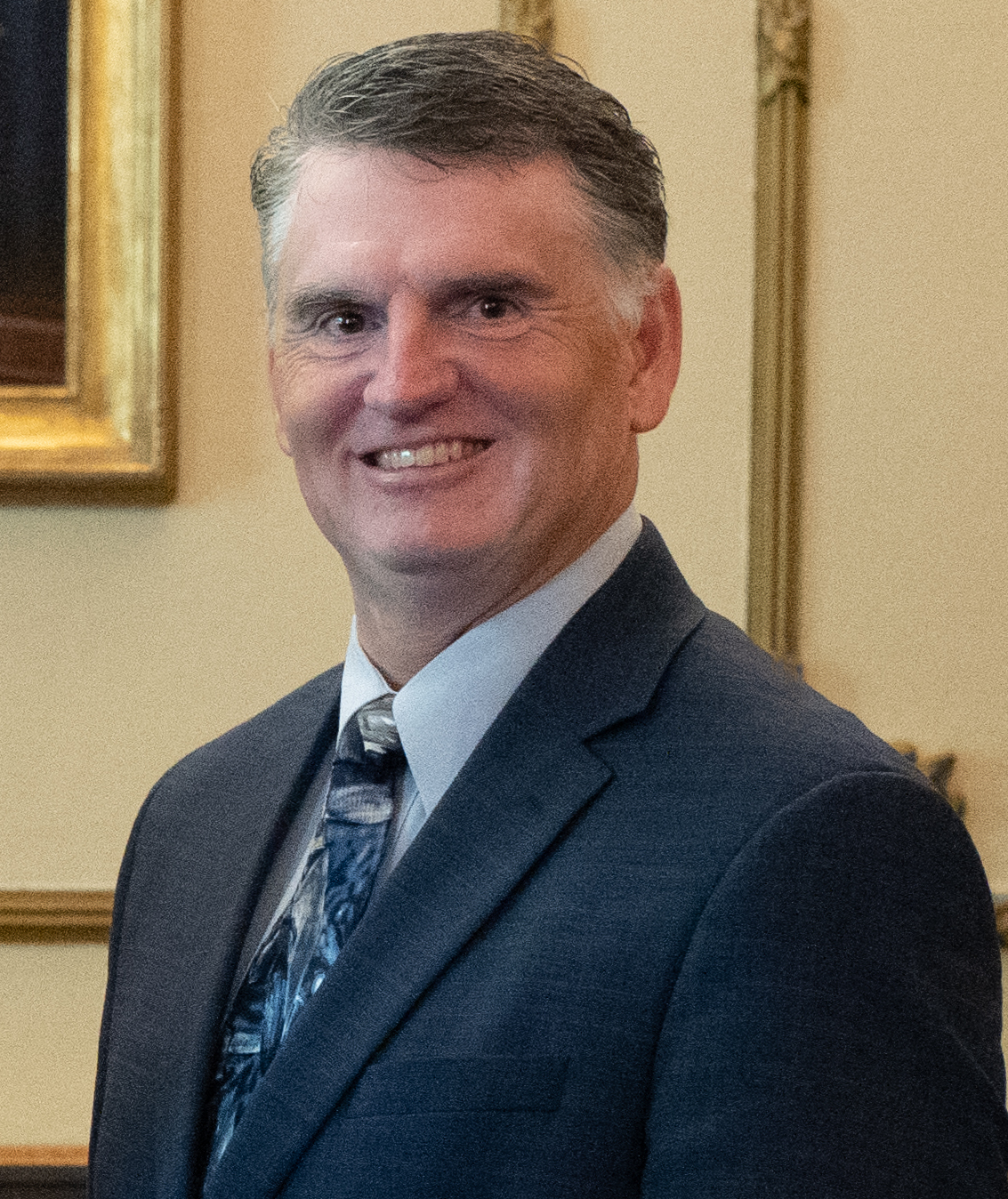
- Elliott in 2023

55th Treasurer of Indiana
- Incumbent
- Assumed office January 9, 2023
- Governor: Eric Holcomb; Mike Braun
- Preceded by: Kelly Mitchell

Personal details
- Born: Toledo, Ohio, U.S.
- Party: Republican
- Spouse: Laura Elliott
- Children: 4
- Education: Utah Valley University (BS)

Daniel Elliott is an American politician. A member of the Republican Party, he has served as the Indiana State Treasurer since 2023.

== Early life and career ==
Elliott grew up in rural Jennings County, Indiana and now lives in Morgan County. His parents were Democrats. Elliott started his own software development business based in Martinsville, Indiana. Elliott graduated from Utah Valley University with a bachelor's degree in business and computer science.

Elliott ran for the Indiana House of Representatives in the 2012 elections, losing in the Republican Party primary election to Peggy Mayfield. In 2013, he was elected chair of the Morgan County Republican Party. In 2016, Daniel was elected as a member of the Morgan County Council. Elliott has served for many years as President of the Morgan County Redevelopment Commission and as a member of the Morgan County Economic Development Corporation. In 2018, he led the successful movement to "endorse marriage between a man and a woman as the ideal basis for strong families" in the Indiana Republican Party platform.

== Indiana State Treasurer ==
In May 2021, Elliott announced his candidacy for Indiana State Treasurer in the 2022 election, as the incumbent, Kelly Mitchell could not run for a third term due to term limits. He won the nomination at the Republican Party convention. Elliott defeated Jessica McClellan, the county treasurer for Monroe County and the Democratic Party nominee, in the November 8 general election. Elliott is the first Latter-day Saint to hold state-wide elected office in Indiana.

Elliott ran for reelection in 2026. He defeated Coumba Kebe in the general election.

== Personal life ==
Elliott lives in Green Township, a rural area of Morgan County, Indiana with his wife, Laura, and their four children. Elliott is a member of the Church of Jesus Christ of Latter-day Saints and served for two years as a missionary in Argentina.

Party political offices
Preceded by Kelly Mitchell	Republican nominee for Treasurer of Indiana; 2022, 2026	Most recent
Political offices
Preceded by Kelly Mitchell	Treasurer of Indiana; 2023–present	Incumbent
