= Leopold Levy =

Indiana politician

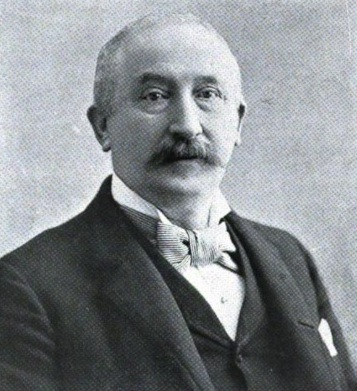
- From Volume III (1919) of Indiana and Indianans

25th Treasurer of Indiana
- In office February 10, 1899 – February 9, 1903
- Governor: James A. Mount; Winfield T. Durbin
- Preceded by: Frederick J. Scholz
- Succeeded by: Nathaniel U. Hill

Personal details
- Born: 1838
- Died: 8 April, 1905, (aged 66–67)
- Political party: Republican

Leopold Levy (1838 – April 8, 1905) was an American businessman and public official. He owned a clothing retailer. Levy was a German immigrant.

He served as State Treasurer of Indiana from 1899 until 1903. He was a Republican.

The Indianapolis Museum of Art has a portrait of him by Charles Despiau. The Indiana State Museum has a kiddush cup he brought from Bavaria Germany.

His clothing business sold ready made clothing and advertised rock bottom prices.
