= Robert Arthur Hughes =

- Dr. Robert Arthur Hughes
- Born: 12 March 1910; Oswestry, Shropshire
- Died: 1 June 1996 (aged 85); Liverpool, England
- Education: Bachelor of Medicine, Bachelor of Surgery; University of Liverpool School of Medicine
- Years active: 30 Years
- Known for: Medical Mission in Shillong, India
- Medical career
- Profession: Surgeon & medical missionary to india
- Institutions: Dr. H. Gordon Roberts Hospital, Shillong

Dr. Robert Arthur Hughes, M.B.Ch.B, M.R.C.S., L.R.C.P., F.R.C.S., O.B.E., (3 December 1910 – 1 June 1996) was a medical missionary for the Presbyterian Church of Wales who worked in Shillong from 1939–1969 at the Welsh Mission Hospital, also known as the Dr. H. Gordon Roberts Hospital, Shillong. Hughes trained as a surgeon in London prior to his time in India. He is called the "Schweitzer of Assam," comparing his missionary work to that of the Nobel Peace Prize winner Albert Schweitzer. During his 40 years in India, Hughes expanded the Welsh Mission Hospital and developed a traveling dispensary to aid those in the surrounding provinces. Hughes is best known for attempting to eradicate malaria from the area, introducing a vagus nerve resection process to alleviate pain from peptic ulcers and a rickets treatment in the infant population, recognising a protein calorie deficiency disorder called kwashiorkor in the Indian population, founding the area's first blood bank, performing the first lower segment Caesarean section without antibiotics to India, and expanding educational training for medical and nursing organisations.

== Early life ==
Robert Arthur Hughes was born on 3 December 1910 to Reverend Howell Harris Hughes and Annie Myfanwy Hughes in Oswestry, a town in Shropshire, England. Shropshire is along the border of Wales, the country of origin for Hughes' parents. Robert Hughes and his brother, John Harris Hughes, were twins, though Robert was older and had better health during their youth. Rev. Howell Harris Hughes, named after Howell Harris, was the Minister at Oswald Road Presbyterian in addition to being a pacifist and involved in the Fellowship of Reconciliation in Wales. Annie Hughes was educated at the University of Wales in Bangor and became headmistress at a school in Rhosllannerchrugog until her marriage to Hughes.

During World War I, Howell Harris was Minister of the Tabernacle Chapel in Bangor, Gwynedd, and Arthur and Harris attended Christchurch School in Waterloo and then the Waterloo and Seaforth Grammar School during this time. When the boys were fifteen, the family moved to Llandudno, where they attended the John Bright School. Robert Hughes excelled in both academics and athletics. Harris Hughes was sickly during his youth and attended the University of Wales in Bangor and became an ordained Minister after attending the United Theological College in Aberystwth. He was eventually elected Moderator of the Presbyterian Church of Wales in 1975.

=== Education ===
In 1928, Robert Hughes entered Liverpool University to study medicine. During his time in the Faculty of Medicine, Hughes joined the Student Christian Movement and the Student Volunteer Movement Union. He was awarded the gold medal in surgery and two other academic distinctions when he graduated in 1933.

After graduating in Medicine, Hughes as a House Surgeon worked at Royal Southern Hospital under the instruction of Mr. O. Herbert Williams, a distinguished surgeon. When he finished his time as House Surgeon, Hughes joined the medical firm of the same hospital under Dr. Norman Capon and worked as House Physician. Hughes then decided to pursue a career in surgical medicine and was appointed the John Rankin Fellow in Human Anatomy, as anatomical knowledge was a requirement for the first FRCS examination.

After passing his first examination in 1935, Hughes spent a short amount of time as Junior Registrar at Stanley Hospital until he became Surgical Registrar and Assistant Surgical Pathologist at David Lewis Northern Hospital. In 1936, Hughes received his diploma MRCS, LRCP. After an unsuccessful first attempt, Hughes passed the final FRCS examination in 1937, becoming a Fellow of the Royal College of Surgeons of England.

In August 1937, Hughes applied to become a missionary for the Presbyterian Church of Wales. At the time, the Foreign Missions Committee of the church had two doctors applying but three hospitals in need of aid. Once the Foreign Mission Committee accepted Hughes in 1937, he was sent to the London School of Tropical Medicine to receive his diploma in Tropical Medicine and Hygiene, or DTM&H. Hughes was assigned to join Dr. Roberts in Shillong upon the completion of his Tropical Medicine course.

== Marriage to Nancy Hughes ==
While working at the David Lewis Northern Hospital, Hughes met Ann "Nancy" Beatrice Wright, who was working as a nurse. Nancy was born on 27 September 1908, to William and Mary Elizabeth Wright, and was the middle of three children. She grew up in Claughton, Birkenhead and attended nursing school in Liverpool. She worked at the Isolation Hospital in Bidston for three years to begin her training, and then took a job at Northern Hospital. Although she would return to Northern, she was accepted a position at Oxford Street Maternity Hospital to complete a course in midwifery training. Upon returning the Northern, she met Hughes, who was working there as a surgical tutor. The two were married on 7 January 1939, and left for India three weeks later. Although Nancy was a trained nurse, the policy of the Mission Society prohibited her from working in the hospital. While Robert Hughes was away during World War II, Nancy Hughes resumed her duties as a nurse, tending to injured Allied soldiers at Dr. H. Gordon Roberts Hospital.

== Medical mission in India ==
On 28 January 1939, the Hughes' left Liverpool for India aboard the City of Marseilles and in February they arrived at the Welsh Mission Hospital in Shillong, which was founded by Dr. Hugh Gordon Roberts in 1922 to serve the Khasi people. Hughes was given charge of the general wards while Dr. Roberts took care of administrative matters until 1942. Upon that time, Hughes was appointed Senior Medical Officer. During daily life at the hospital, Hughes cared for patients suffering from road accidents, animal mauling, diphtheria, malaria, typhoid, dysentery, leprosy, and tuberculosis.

When World War II reached Assam, Hughes was inducted into the British army in 1942 to serve as a liaison on the health of the Kohima and Dimapur Road workers between health officials and the British army. Hughes was forced to return to Shillong as fighting intensified and the local hospitals were the main recipients of soldiers from the Burma Road. From his return until 1945, Hughes was the consulting surgeon at two local military hospitals as well as Senior Medical Officer at the Welsh Mission Hospital. During this time he treated 2,851 patients, many of whom were British officers and soldiers.

After the War, Hughes turned his attention back to the Welsh Mission Hospital. Hughes constructed and installed the first central heating system in northeastern India to heat the hospital, and also created a steam dryer and cooking range. Due to the lack of a missionary colleague, Hughes began medical education programs for local men and women.

In 1947, Hughes began a travelling dispensary to make weekly visits to marketplaces around Shillong to distribute medical care and health education, which he would do for 20 years. He used this time to survey the health of the villages, and turned his attention towards maternal and infant health. Hughes developed midwifery training for local women and a maternity unit in the Mission Hospital to improve health. He also became involved in advocacy, joining different social, medical, nursing, and welfare organisations with the goal of improving local health. Hughes worked at the Welsh Mission Hospital until 1969, when he and Nancy returned to Wales.

== Religious involvement in the Welsh Presbyterian Church ==
While in India in 1944, Hughes was elected an elder in the Shillong branch of the Presbyterian Church, with his main responsibility being religious education. When he began his travelling dispensary in 1947, Hughes intended to deliver medical care as well as evangelical sermons. In 1971, Hughes was elected an elder by the Presbyterian Church in Liverpool, and was elected Moderator of the Presbyterian Church of Wales in 1992. In 1991, the Hughes returned to Shillong to celebrate the 150th anniversary of the arrival of Welsh Presbyterian missionary involvement in northeastern India.

== Legacy ==
Hughes is known for performing several operations for the first time in India, such as the lower segment Caesarean section without antibiotics and vagus nerve resection process to alleviate pain from peptic ulcers. He also introduced ether to northeastern Indian hospitals as a form of general anaesthesia, recognised and began treating rickets in the Khasi infant population, and developed India-specific treatments for kwashiorkor, a protein calorie deficiency disorder. Under Hughes' direction, the Welsh Mission Hospital in 1942 employed more nurses and staff than the rest of the hospitals in Assam combined, as well as performed more surgeries. Hughes began the first blood bank in Shillong to meet the medical needs of his patients. As a result of these achievements, Hughes is known by many as the "Schweitzer of Assam." Hughes died Saturday, 1 June 1996, at the Cardiothoracic Hospital in Liverpool.
