= F. Shirley Wilcox =

39th Treasurer of Indiana
- In office February 10, 1949 – February 10, 1951
- Preceded by: Frank T. Millis
- Succeeded by: William L. Fortune

Personal details
- Born: Frank Shirley Wilcox; November 20, 1894; New Albany, Indiana, U.S.
- Died: January 26, 1960 (aged 65); New Albany, Indiana, U.S.
- Political party: Democratic

F. Shirley Wilcox (November 20, 1894 – January 26, 1960) was a politician and government official who served as Indiana's 39th State Treasurer.

== Early life ==
Frank Shirley Wilcox was born November 20, 1894, in New Albany, Indiana, the second of Frank Hamilton and Portia (née Fullenlove) Wilcox's two children.

In 1933 Wilcox (then a manager of a New Albany theatre) and Sherman Minton (then Public Counselor of the Indiana Public Service Commission) tried to rescue two 10-year-old boys who had been swept into the Ohio River when the slate embankment they were walking upon collapsed. The effort was not successful.

== Political career ==
A lifelong Democrat, Wilcox was appointed Indiana Internal Revenue Collector by president Harry S. Truman in 1946. When he accepted the position, Wilcox immediately cut his ties to his then current business interests, including working for WGRC AM radio station and three local theaters.

In 1948, prominent Indiana Democrats launched a campaign to draft Wilcox as the Democratic candidate for Indiana governor, saying "he (Wilcox) was the most qualified candidate to lead us to victory". Wilcox said his friends' "efforts are purely voluntary... to be mentioned for the great office of Governor is a distinct honor. However, as a federal employee under the Hatch Act, I am precluded from being a candidate for any office... if I am nominated, I will resign, accept the nomination and make every effort to be elected".

Instead of Governor, Wilcox was the Democratic nominee for and elected the 39th Indiana State Treasurer on February 10, 1949. His term expired on February 10, 1951.

In 1952 Wilcox was appointed state director of the Federal Housing Administration. In 1953 Wilcox was named to the state Tax Board. In 1957 Wilcox served as City Controller for New Albany, Indiana. When New Albany advanced from being a third class city to a second class city, Wilcox was named president of the city's department of Public Works and Safety, a post he held until his death. At that time, Wilcox and his family lived at 837 Cedar Bough Place in New Albany.

== Death and burial ==
A sufferer of heart ailments for several years, Wilcox died of pneumonia in the Floyd County (Indiana) Memorial Hospital and was buried in New Albany's Fairview Cemetery.
