= Albert Gall =

American politician (1842–1905)

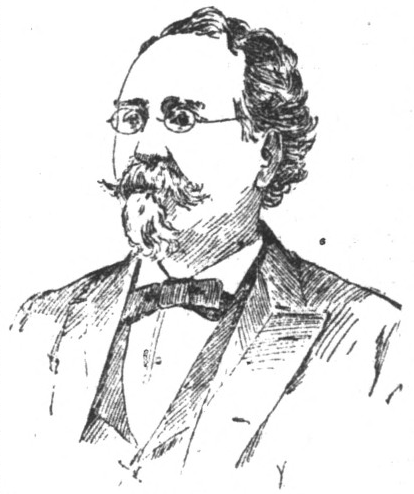

23rd Treasurer of Indiana
- In office February 9, 1891 – February 9, 1895
- Governor: Ira Joy Chase; Claude Matthews
- Preceded by: Julius A. Lemcke
- Succeeded by: Frederick J. Scholz

Personal details
- Born: John Wallis Albert Gall; November 23, 1842 Green Bay, Wisconsin Territory, U.S.
- Died: October 13, 1905 (aged 62) Crown Hill Cemetery and Arboretum
- Resting place: Crown Hill Cemetery and Arboretum Sec 8, Lot 32
- Party: Democratic
- Spouse(s): Louisa C. Ruschaupt (1864–1895); Ruth Wiggers (ca. 1895-death)
- Parent(s): Alois D. Gall; Caroline Gall
- Occupation: Businessman

John Wallis Albert Gall (November 23, 1842 – October 13, 1905) was an American retail businessman and the former State Treasurer of Indiana. He owned a popular carpet and furnishing company in Indianapolis and was a lifelong Democrat. At his death, he was one of the wealthiest men in Indiana.

== Early life and education ==
Gall was born on November 23, 1842, in Green Bay, Wisconsin. His father was a surgeon named Alois D. Gall. His mother was named Caroline. Gall had an older sister Bertha and a younger brother Edmond. When he was five years old, Gall and his family moved to Indianapolis, Indiana.

Gall's father was named consul to Antwerp in 1853 and held the office until 1858. His family left Indianapolis for Antwerp Albert Gall attended boarding school in Frankfurt. During his time in Europe he became fluent in German and French. In 1859, Gall moved back to Indianapolis.

== Career ==
Upon his return to Indianapolis, Gall began working in retail, selling dry goods. He left Indianapolis by 1860 for San Francisco. Four years later, he moved back to Indianapolis and married Louisa C. Ruschaupt on October 20, 1864. They had four children: Berthe, Freddie, Albert and Eddie. Gall started selling carpets for J. Kraus and Company. Gall's father bought him a stake in the company in 1864 and it was renamed Kraus and Gall. The company was named Albert Gall in 1867 and Gall became the sole owner.

In 1890, Gall was elected Treasurer of Indiana. He was elected again, in 1892. Gall was a Democrat. In 1893, Gall lost $65,000 in property that he signed over to Indianapolis National Bank when the bank failed and closed. Gall did not run for re-election at the end of his second term.

== Later life and death ==
In 1895, Louisa died. Gall remarried, marrying Ruth Wiggers.

Gall died on October 13, 1905, at his home in Indianapolis. Gall had heart disease and gout. At the time of his death, he was planning to build a six-story building in downtown Indianapolis and was contracted to decorate the Indiana State House. He is buried at Crown Hill Cemetery. Gall was a 33rd degree member of the Scottish Rite and a member of the Knights Templar. At the time of his death, he was worth over $150,000, which is over $4.4 million as of 2020.

== Legacy ==
Gall's papers are held in the collection of the Indiana State Library.
