= Julius Augustus Lemcke =

Indiana state treasurer

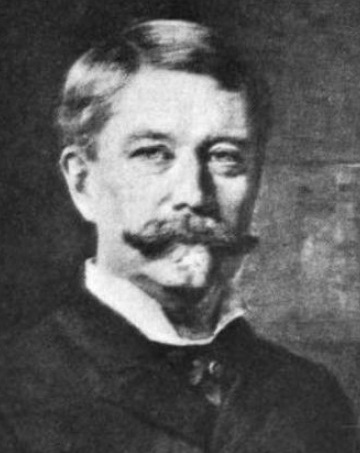
- Frontispiece of 1905's Reminiscences of an Indianian

22nd Treasurer of Indiana
- In office February 9, 1887 – February 9, 1891
- Governor: James A. Mount
- Preceded by: John J. Cooper
- Succeeded by: Albert Gall

Personal details
- Born: 1832 Hamburg, Germany
- Died: January 22, 1911, (aged 76–77) Evansville, Indiana, US
- Resting place: Oak Hill Cemetery, Evansville, Indiana, US
- Party: Republican

Julius Augustus Lemcke (1832 ‒ January 22, 1909) was State Treasurer of Indiana and wrote a memoir titled Reminiscences of an Indianian From the Sassafras Log Behind the Barn in Posey County to Broader Fields.

Lemcke was born in Hamburg, Germany.

Lemcke was the majority owner of a steamboat. He also owned a hotel. He built the Lemcke Building.
