= Kelly Mitchell =

American politician

54th Treasurer of Indiana
- In office November 18, 2014 – January 9, 2023
- Governor: Mike Pence; Eric Holcomb
- Preceded by: Richard Mourdock
- Succeeded by: Daniel Elliott

Personal details
- Born: 1966 or 1967 (age 58–59) Newport, Rhode Island, U.S.
- Party: Republican
- Spouse: Larry Mitchell
- Children: 4
- Education: Valparaiso University (BA); Indiana University, Indianapolis (MA); United States Army War College (MA)

Kelly Mitchell (born 1967) is an American politician and businesswoman who served as the 54th Indiana State Treasurer. She was elected treasurer on November 4, 2014, and assumed office early on November 18, 2014. She replaced interim Treasurer, Daniel Huge, who took over after Richard Mourdock resigned. Mitchell was an at-large delegate to the 2016 Republican National Convention from Indiana. Mitchell also served an Electoral College Elector in Indiana, proudly casting her vote for President Donald J. Trump in late 2016. She was a candidate in the 2020 Republican primary in Indiana's 5th congressional district, receiving 5.3% of the vote.

== Early life and education ==
Born in Newport, Rhode Island, Mitchell earned a Bachelor of Arts degree in political science from Valparaiso University and a Master of Arts in philanthropic studies from Indiana University – Purdue University Indianapolis. Mitchell completed The Commandant's National Security Seminar and earned a Master of Arts in strategic studies from the United States Army War College.

== Career ==
Before becoming Treasurer of Indiana, Mitchell served as director of TrustINdiana from November 2007 to August 2014. Her office was part of the State Treasurer's office. Before becoming Director of TrustINdiana, She served as Cass County Commissioner from January 1997 to September 2004. During her tenure as Commissioner, she served as President of the Board of Commissioners for five years and was named First-Term Commissioner of the Year by the Association of County Commissioners. Treasurer Mitchell also served on the State Board of the Association of County Commissioners for three years, and as a member of the County Government Senate Study Commission. As Commissioner, she served seven years on the Logansport-Cass County Economic Development Foundation and as President of the Foundation for one year. She founded and co-chaired Cass County "Make a Difference Day", managing hundreds of volunteers and dozens of projects every year.

=== Indiana State Treasurer ===
Mitchell filed her candidacy for State Treasurer in 2013. Two other candidates vied for the position. Financial advisor and candidate for the U.S. Senate in 2010 and for Indiana's 6th congressional district in 2012 Don Bates and Marion Mayor and candidate for Indiana's 5th congressional district in 2012 Wayne Seybold. In the Republican primary convention, the first ballot was a "relative toss-up" and although no candidate won a majority on the second ballot, Mitchell gained votes. Bates, who was in third place, was dropped after the second ballot. Mitchell won the third ballot, by 860 votes to 497. She defeated her Democratic opponent, former member of the Illinois House of Representatives and candidate for Lieutenant Governor of Illinois in 2010 Mike Boland on November 4, 2014.

In July 2017, Mitchell announced the launch of INvestABLE Indiana which is a savings program for disabled Hoosiers. Prior to this, people with disabilities who saved more than $2,000 could lose government benefits. Now, they can use the plan to save $14,000 a year, and keep $100,000 in the account. In order to qualify, a person must have the onset of disability before the age of 26. They must also be receiving Social Security benefits.

On September 4, 2019, Mitchell officially entered the race for the Republican nomination for Indiana's 5th congressional district to replace retiring Congresswoman Susan Brooks. She received 5.3% of the vote in the primary.

In 2021, James Holden, a former Indiana chief deputy treasurer, filed a whistleblower lawsuit against former Indiana State Treasurer Kelly Mitchell in the Marion County Superior Court. The lawsuit alleged that between 2015 and 2020, Mitchell violated state procurement laws by illegally steering over $6 million in non-competitive contracts to political donors and financial institutions. According to the complaint, these agreements—which included banking, financial, and lobbying services—were awarded without the mandatory oversight and approvals required from the Indiana Department of Administration, the State Budget Agency, and the Attorney General's Office. The lawsuit identified ten entities that received funds, including Public Trust Advisors ($2,141,476), PNC Bank ($1,096,104), and the law firm Ice Miller ($168,377).

In October 2022, Marion County Superior Court Judge John Chavis II dismissed the lawsuit on two primary legal grounds. First, the court ruled that as an independently elected constitutional officer, the state treasurer is not statutorily bound to seek executive-branch approvals for operational contracts. Second, the judge found that Holden did not qualify as a legitimate whistleblower under state law, noting that his allegations were based on public records requests compiled after his 2014 termination rather than direct, independent personal knowledge.https://apnews.com/article/business-lawsuits-indiana-abe6a8e95a318b29ff6c3a00f36c9377

== Personal life ==
Mitchell resides in Indianapolis, with her husband Larry, and they have a blended family of four children.

Party political offices
Preceded by Richard Mourdock	Republican nominee for Treasurer of Indiana; 2014, 2018	Succeeded by Dan Elliott
Political offices
Preceded by Daniel Huge; Acting	Treasurer of Indiana; 2014–2022	Succeeded by Dan Elliot
