= Robert E. Hughes =

American chemist (1924–2017)

Robert Edward Hughes (May 31, 1924 – April 2, 2017) was an American professor of physical chemistry at Cornell University, director of the Materials Science Center at Cornell, a U.S. Senate-confirmed assistant director of the National Science Foundation, and longtime president of Associated Universities that operated Brookhaven National Laboratories for the U.S. Department of Energy, and the National Radio Astronomy Observatory (NRAO) and the Very Large Array telescope in New Mexico, and the 100 meter radio telescope in Greenbank, West Virginia.

== Early life and education ==
Hughes was born in New York City in 1924. He enlisted in the U.S. Army in early 1942 and served until 1946. He received a bachelor's degree in 1949 from Lehigh University followed by a PhD from Cornell University in 1952.

== Academic career ==
Hughes' thesis at Cornell determined the first x-ray crystallographic determination of the crystal structure of boron in 1953. His thesis, and subsequent work with his mentor and colleague J. L Hoard, led Nobel Laureate Linus Pauling to comment "This is the most beautiful structure I have ever seen". Of Hoard and Hughes paper on Tetragonal Boron Pauling wrote: "I think that it is one of the best crystal-structure determinations that has ever been made."

He became an assistant professor of chemistry at the University of Pennsylvania in 1953 and by 1964 a full professor. While at Penn, based on DARPA's request for proposals for interdisciplinary materials research, Hughes helped co-found the Laboratory for Research on the Structure of Matter in 1962.

He returned to Cornell as a professor of chemistry in 1964, and became director of the Materials Science Center at Cornell from 1968 to 1974. He was a co-founder and editor of the Journal of Solid State Chemistry and an associate editor of Materials Science and Engineering.

== Public service ==
In 1974 he was appointed assistant director of the National Science Foundation (NSF) for National and International Programs; in 1975 he became assistant director for Astronomical, Atmospheric, Earth and Ocean Sciences. He headed the U.S. delegations to the Eighth Antarctic Treaty Consultative Meeting in Oslo, Norway. The National Science Board recognized his many contributions, noting that Dr. Hughes "...contributed immeasurably to the development and advancement of the National Science Foundation programs under his direction and to the welfare of science in the Nation..." Hughes returned to Cornell as Professor of Chemistry in 1977.

From 1980 to 1996 Hughes was President of Associated Universities Incorporated (AUI). AUI, founded by Isidor Rabi in 1946, a non-profit partnership between universities and the government to run Brookhaven National Laboratory, AUI also managed and operated for the NRAO the telescope at Greenbank West Virginia, and for the NSF the Very Large Array near Socorro NM, linked to a string of radio telescopes around the world.

== Publications ==
- "The Structure of Tetragonal Boron", J. L Hoard, R.E. Hughes and D.E. Sands, Journal of the American Chemical Society 1958, 80, 17, 4507–4515.
- "The Structure of -Rhombohedral Boron", R. E. Hughes, C. H. L. Kennard, D. B. Sullenger, H. A. Weakliem, D. E. Sands, J. L. Hoard, Journal of the American Chemical Society 1963, 85, 3, 361-362
- J. L. Hoard and R. E. Hughes, in The Chemistry of Boron and Its Compounds, edited by E. L. Muetterties (Wiley, New York, 1967).
