= Bobby Hughes (baseball) =

American baseball player (born 1971)

- Catcher
- Born: March 10, 1971 (age 54); Burbank, California, U.S.
- Batted: Right Threw: Right

MLB debut
- April 2, 1998, for the Milwaukee Brewers

Last MLB appearance
- August 22, 1999, for the Milwaukee Brewers

MLB statistics
- Batting average: .238
- Home runs: 12
- Runs batted in: 37
- Stats at Baseball Reference

Teams
- Milwaukee Brewers (1998–1999)

Robert E. Hughes (born March 10, 1971) is a former Major League Baseball catcher who played for the Milwaukee Brewers in 1998 and 1999.

Hughes attended the University of Southern California. In 1991, he played collegiate summer baseball with the Wareham Gatemen of the Cape Cod Baseball League.
