= Indiana State Treasurer =

American political office

Treasurer of Indiana
- Seal of Indiana

- Incumbent; Dan Elliott since January 9, 2023
- Term length: 4 years
- Inaugural holder: Daniel Crosby Lane; November 7, 1816
- Formation: Indiana Constitution; 1816
- Succession: Fourth
- Salary: $145,876
- Website: http://www.in.gov/tos/

The Indiana Treasurer of State is a constitutional and elected office in the executive branch of the government of Indiana. The treasurer is responsible for managing the finances of the U.S. state of Indiana. The position was filled by appointment from 1816 until the adoption of the new Constitution of Indiana in 1851, which made the position filled by election. As of 2023, there have been fifty-five treasurers. The incumbent is Republican Dan Elliott who has served in the position since January 9, 2023.

== Term limits and qualification ==
The Indiana State Treasurer is a constitutional office first established in the 1816 Constitution of Indiana, and was made largely to mirror the position of the treasurer during Indiana's territorial period. Between 1816 and until 1851, the treasurer was nominated by the governor and confirmed by the state senate. With adoption of the current constitution in 1851 the treasurer's office was filled by a public statewide election every four years.

Treasurers take office on February 10 following their election and hold office for four years. Should they resign, be impeached, or die in office the governor has the power to appoint a temporary treasurer to serve until the next general election. The new treasurer, either appointed to elected may only complete the term of the previous treasurer, not serve a new four-year term. A treasurer may be elected to consecutive terms, but may serve no more than eight years in any twelve-year period.

== Powers ==
The treasurer's powers are both constitutional and statutory. The treasurer's constitutional powers make him the chief financial officer of the state government and give him control over all of the state's financial assets. Because the state operates with a large reserve fund, this gives the treasurer control over a large amount of money. In 2007, the total state portfolio was valued at over $5 billion. The treasurer is permitted to invest the funds several different ways, including investments in United States Treasury securities, certificates of deposit, repurchase agreements, and money market mutual funds.

The Indiana General Assembly has assigned the treasurer additional statutory power and made him a member of the state Board of Finance, Indiana Finance Authority, Indiana Transportation Finance Authority, State Office Building Commission, Recreational Development Commission, Indiana Grain Indemnity Fund Board, Indiana Underground Storage Tank Financial Assurance Board, and the Indiana Heritage Trust Committee. Additionally, the treasurer is the vice-chairman of the Indiana Housing Finance Authority and the Indiana State Police Pension Fund. As a member of these boards, the treasurer has a wide range of influence on the state's financial management.

The treasurer is also the head of several of the most important state financial organizations. The treasurer is chairman of the Indiana Bond Bank, a state controlled bank that provides financing to municipal government to allow for large infrastructure investments. The bank then sells the debts as secured bonds on the national market. This allows local governments to secure credit a low rate of interest. The treasurer is also the chairman of the Indiana Education Savings Authority which manages savings accounts for college educations. The treasurer chairs the Public Deposit Insurance Fund and the Board for Depositories that insures the deposits of municipal governments in the state, much as the Federal Deposit Insurance Corporation insures private accounts, except without limiting the amount of the insurance. The Indiana Institute for Public Funds Management is private organization that was developed to provide financial education for municipal government leaders. The treasurer is designated by the organization its chairman.

== List of treasurers ==
Democratic-Republican Democratic Whig Republican

=== Territorial treasurers ===
| # | Name | Took office | Left office | Party | Hometown | Notes |
|---|---|---|---|---|---|---|
| 1 | Davis Floyd | 1814 | 1816 | Democratic-Republican | Corydon, Indiana | |

=== State treasurers ===
| # | Image | Name | Took office | Left office | Party | Hometown | Notes |
|---|---|---|---|---|---|---|---|
| 1 | | Daniel Crosby Lane | November 16, 1816 | December 28, 1822 | Democratic-Republican | Harrison County, Indiana | |
| 2 | | Samuel Merrill | December 28, 1822 | February 13, 1834 | Whig | Corydon & Indianapolis, Indiana | |
| 3 | | Nathan B. Palmer | February 13, 1834 | February 9, 1841 | Democratic | Jefferson County, Indiana | |
| 4 | | George H. Dunn | February 9, 1841 | February 9, 1844 | Whig | Jefferson County, Indiana | |
| 5 | | Royal Mayhew | February 9, 1844 | February 9, 1847 | Democratic | Lawrenceburg, Indiana | |
| 6 | | Samuel Hannah | February 9, 1847 | February 9, 1850 | Whig | Shelby County, Indiana | |
| 7 | | James P. Drake | February 9, 1850 | February 9, 1853 | Democratic | Indianapolis, Indiana | |
| 8 | | Elijah Newland | February 9, 1853 | February 9, 1855 | Democratic | Washington County, Indiana | |
| 9 | | William R. Nofsinger | February 9, 1855 | February 9, 1857 | Republican | Parke County, Indiana | |
| 10 | | Aquilla Jones | February 9, 1857 | February 9, 1859 | Democratic | Columbus, Indiana | |
| 11 | | Nathaniel G. Cunningham | February 9, 1859 | February 9, 1861 | Democratic | Vigo County, Indiana | |
| 12 | | Jonathan S. Harvey | February 9, 1861 | February 9, 1863 | Republican | Jeffersonville, Indiana | |
| 13 | | Matthew L. Brett | February 9, 1863 | February 9, 1865 | Democratic | Daviess County, Indiana | |
| 14 | | John I. Morris | February 9, 1865 | February 9, 1867 | Republican | Salem, Indiana | |
| 15 | | Nathan Kimball | February 9, 1867 | February 9, 1871 | Republican | Loogootee, Indiana | |
| 16 | | James B. Ryan | February 9, 1871 | February 9, 1873 | Democratic | Indianapolis, Indiana | |
| 17 | | John B. Glover | February 9, 1873 | February 9, 1875 | Republican | Bedford, Indiana | |
| 18 | | Benjamin C. Shaw | February 9, 1875 | February 9, 1879 | Democratic | Indianapolis, Indiana | |
| 19 | | William Fleming | February 9, 1879 | February 5, 1881 | Democratic | Fort Wayne, Indiana | |
| 20 | | Roswell S. Hill | February 5, 1881 | February 9, 1883 | Republican | Brazil, Indiana | |
| 21 | | John J. Cooper | February 9, 1883 | February 9, 1887 | Democratic | Indianapolis, Indiana | |
| 22 | | Julius A. Lemcke | February 9, 1887 | February 9, 1891 | Republican | Evansville, Indiana | |
| 23 | | Albert Gall | February 9, 1891 | February 9, 1895 | Democratic | Indianapolis, Indiana | |
| 24 | | Frederick J. Scholz | February 9, 1895 | February 10, 1899 | Republican | Evansville, Indiana | |
| 25 | | Leopold Levy | February 10, 1899 | February 9, 1903 | Republican | Indianapolis, Indiana | |
| 26 | | Nathaniel U. Hill | February 9, 1903 | February 10, 1907 | Republican | Bloomington, Indiana | |
| 27 | | Oscar C. Hadley | February 10, 1907 | February 9, 1911 | Republican | Plainfield, Indiana | |
| 28 | | William H. Vollmer | February 10, 1911 | February 10, 1915 | Democratic | Vincennes, Indiana | |
| 29 | | George A. Bittler | February 10, 1915 | February 10, 1917 | Democratic | Fort Wayne, Indiana | |
| 30 | | Uz McMurtie | February 10, 1917 | February 10, 1921 | Republican | Marion, Indiana | |
| 31 | | Ora J. Davies | February 10, 1921 | February 10, 1925 | Republican | Kokomo, Indiana | |
| 32 | | Bernhardt H. Urbahns | February 10, 1925 | January 22, 1926 | Republican | Indianapolis, Indiana | |
| 33 | | Grace Urbahns | January 22, 1926 | February 10, 1931 | Republican | Indianapolis, Indiana | |
| 34 | | William Storen | February 10, 1931 | February 10, 1935 | Democratic | Scottsburg, Indiana | |
| 35 | | Peter Hein | February 10, 1935 | February 10, 1939 | Democratic | Crown Point, Indiana | |
| 36 | | Joseph M. Robertson | February 10, 1939 | February 10, 1941 | Democratic | Brownstown, Indiana | |
| 37 | | James M. Givens | February 10, 1941 | February 10, 1945 | Republican | Porter, Indiana | |
| 38 | | Frank T. Millis | February 10, 1945 | February 10, 1949 | Republican | Campbellsburg, Indiana | |
| 39 | | F. Shirley Wilcox | February 10, 1949 | February 10, 1951 | Democratic | New Albany, Indiana | |
| 40 | | William L. Fortune | February 10, 1951 | February 10, 1953 | Republican | Carmel, Indiana | |
| 42 | | John Peters | February 10, 1953 | February 10, 1957 | Republican | New Albany, Indiana | |
| 43 | | Adolph L. Fossler | February 10, 1957 | February 10, 1959 | Republican | Indianapolis, Indiana | |
| 44 | | Jack A. Haymaker | February 10, 1959 | February 10, 1961 | Democratic | Logansport, Indiana | |
| 45 | | Robert E. Hughes | February 10, 1961 | February 10, 1963 | Republican | Greenwood, Indiana | |
| 46 | | Jack L. New | February 10, 1965 | February 10, 1967 | Democratic | Greenwood, Indiana | |
| 47 | | John Snyder | February 10, 1967 | February 10, 1971 | Republican | Washington, Indiana | |
| 48 | | Jack L. New | February 10, 1971 | February 10, 1979 | Democratic | Greenfield, Indiana | |
| 49 | | Julian Ridlen | February 10, 1979 | February 10, 1987 | Republican | Logansport, Indiana | |
| 50 | | Marjorie H. O’Laughlin | February 10, 1987 | February 10, 1995 | Republican | Indianapolis, Indiana | |
| 51 | | Joyce Brinkman | February 10, 1995 | February 10, 1999 | Republican | Indianapolis, Indiana | |
| 52 | | Tim Berry | February 10, 1999 | February 10, 2007 | Republican | Fort Wayne, Indiana | |
| 53 | | Richard Mourdock | February 10, 2007 | August 29, 2014 | Republican | Evansville, Indiana | |
| 54 | | Kelly Mitchell | November 18, 2014 | January 9, 2023 | Republican | Logansport, Indiana | |
| 55 | | Dan Elliott | January 9, 2023 | present | Republican | Green Township, Indiana | |

== See also ==
- Government of Indiana

== Sources ==
- Funk, Arville L (1983) [1969]. A Sketchbook of Indiana History. Rochester, Indiana: Christian Book Press. pp. 210–211.
- Indiana Chamber (2007). Here's Your Indiana Government. Indiana Camber of Commerce. ISBN 978-1-883698-79-9.
