= 2012 Indiana Superintendent of Public Instruction election =

- November 6, 2012
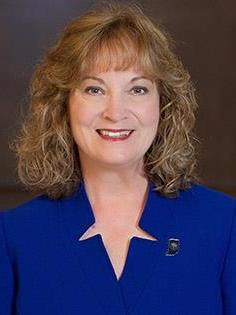

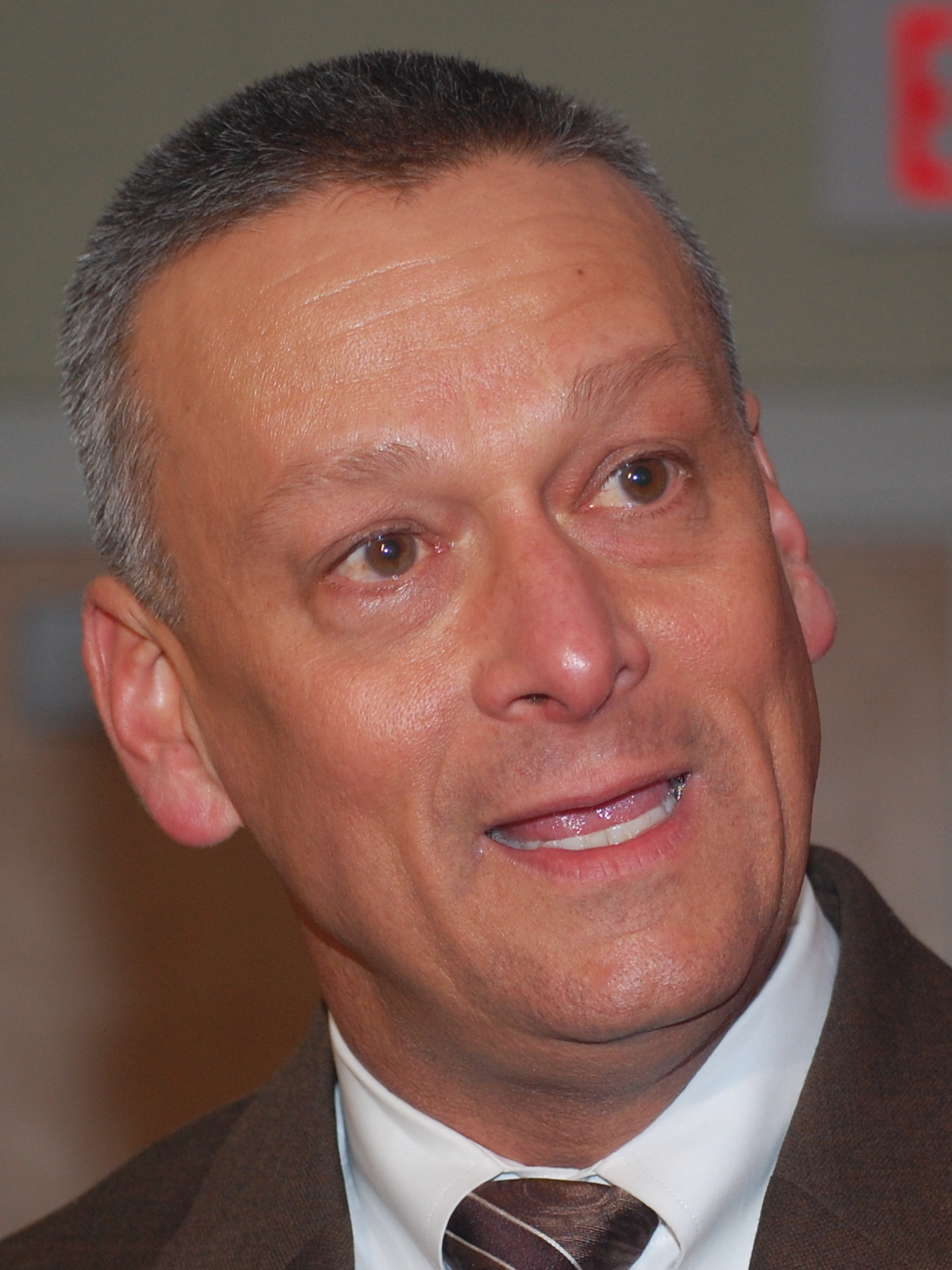
Nominee	Glenda Ritz	Tony Bennett
Party	Democratic	Republican
Popular vote	1,332,755	1,190,716
Percentage	52.81%	47.19%
- County results Ritz: 50–60% 60–70% Bennett: 50–60% 60–70%
Superintendent of Public Instruction before election
Tony Bennett
Republican
Elected Superintendent of Public Instruction
Glenda Ritz
Democratic

The 2012 Indiana Superintendent of Public Instruction election was held on November 6, 2012, to elect the Indiana Superintendent of Public Instruction. Republican incumbent Tony Bennett ran for a second term but lost to Democrat Glenda Ritz by five percentage points.

This election, alongside the concurrent U.S. Senate election, was the last time the Democratic Party won a statewide election in Indiana until 2026.

== General election ==
=== Candidates ===
- Glenda Ritz, educator and library media specialist (Democratic)
- Tony Bennett, incumbent Superintendent of Public Instruction (2009–2013) (Republican)

=== Results ===
2012 Indiana Superintendent of Public Instruction election results
Party	Candidate	Votes	%
Democratic	Glenda Ritz	1,332,755	52.81%
Republican	Tony Bennett	1,190,716	47.19%
Total votes		2,523,471	100.00%
Democratic gain from Republican			
