= 2016 Indiana elections =

Indiana elections, 2016
- November 8, 2016

A general election was held in the U.S. state of Indiana on November 8, 2016. Elections were held for president of the United States, United States senator, governor of Indiana, two of Indiana's executive officers, and all nine of Indiana's seats in the United States House of Representatives.

== Attorney general ==
Indiana attorney general election, 2016
- November 8, 2016
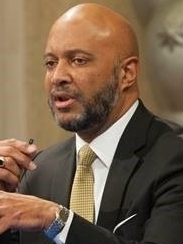

Nominee	Curtis Hill	Lorenzo Arredondo
Party	Republican	Democratic
Popular vote	1,643,689	994,085
Percentage	62.31%	37.69%
- Hill: 50–60% 60–70% 70–80% 80–90% >90% Arredondo: 50–60% 60–70% 70–80% 80–90% >90% Tie: 50% No data
Attorney General before election
Greg Zoeller
Republican
Elected Attorney General
Curtis Hill
Republican

Incumbent Republican Attorney General Greg Zoeller declined to run for a third term, in order to run for Congress. Republicans chose Curtis Hill, Elkhart County prosecutor since 2002, over former Attorney General Steve Carter, State Senator Randall Head, and then-deputy Attorney General Abby Kuzma at the Republican state convention on June 11, 2016.

Democrats nominated Lorenzo Arredondo, former Lake County Circuit Judge from 1976 to 2010

=== Polling ===
Poll source	Date(s) administered	Sample size	Margin of error	Curtis Hill (R)	Lorenzo Arredondo (D)	Other	Undecided
Gravis Marketing	October 30 – November 1, 2016	399	± 4.9%	39%	29%	—	31%
Ball State Hoosier Survey	October 10–16, 2016	544	± 4.8%	44%	32%	—	21%

==== General election ====
===== Predictions =====
Source	Ranking
Governing	Lean R

===== Results =====
Indiana attorney general election, 2016
Party	Candidate	Votes	%
Republican	Curtis Hill	1,643,689	62.31
Democratic	Lorenzo Arredondo	994,085	37.69
Total votes		2,637,774	100
Republican hold			

== Superintendent of public instruction ==
Indiana superintendent of public instruction election, 2016
- November 8, 2016
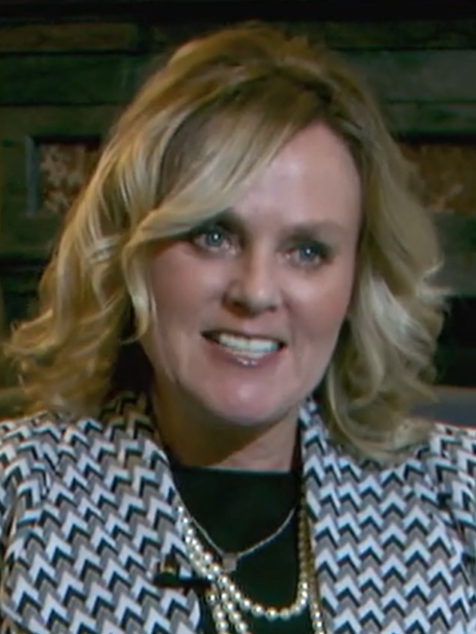

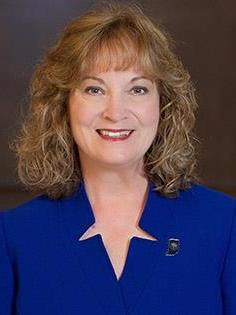
Nominee	Jennifer McCormick	Glenda Ritz
Party	Republican	Democratic
Popular vote	1,423,042	1,240,474
Percentage	53.43%	46.57%
- County results McCormick: 50–60% 60–70% 70–80% Ritz: 50–60% 60–70%
Superintendent before election
Glenda Ritz
Democratic
Elected Superintendent
Jennifer McCormick
Republican

Incumbent Democratic Superintendent of Public Instruction Glenda Ritz ran for re-election. She was unopposed at the Democratic State Convention on June 18, 2016.

Republicans nominated Jennifer McCormick, superintendent of Yorktown Community Schools since 2010 over Dawn Wooten, adjunct faculty at Fort Wayne-area universities.

In 2019, Governor Eric Holcomb signed House Bill 1005, which would abolish the office and create an appointed position of secretary of education to replace it, effective January 11, 2021. As a consequence, the 2016 election was the last election held for the office.

=== Polling ===
Poll source	Date(s) administered	Sample size	Margin of error	Glenda Ritz (D)	Jennifer McCormick (R)	Other	Undecided
Ball State Hoosier Survey	October 10–16, 2016	544	± 4.8%	45%	38%	—	15%

==== General election ====
===== Results =====
Indiana State Superintendent of Public Instruction election, 2016
Party	Candidate	Votes	%
Republican	Jennifer McCormick	1,423,042	53.43%
Democratic	Glenda Ritz (incumbent)	1,240,474	46.57%
Total votes		2,662,103	100

== General Assembly ==
Half of the seats of the Indiana Senate and all of the seats of the Indiana House of Representatives were up for election in 2016. Republicans held control of both chambers, maintaining a government trifecta.

Indiana Senate
Party	Before	After	Change
Republican	40	41	▲1
Democratic	10	9	▼1
Total	50	50	

Indiana House of Representatives
Party	Before	After	Change
Republican	71	70	▼1
Democratic	29	30	▲1
Total	100	100	
