= Education in Indiana =

Education in Indiana covers public and private schools, and higher education, from the territorial period to the present.

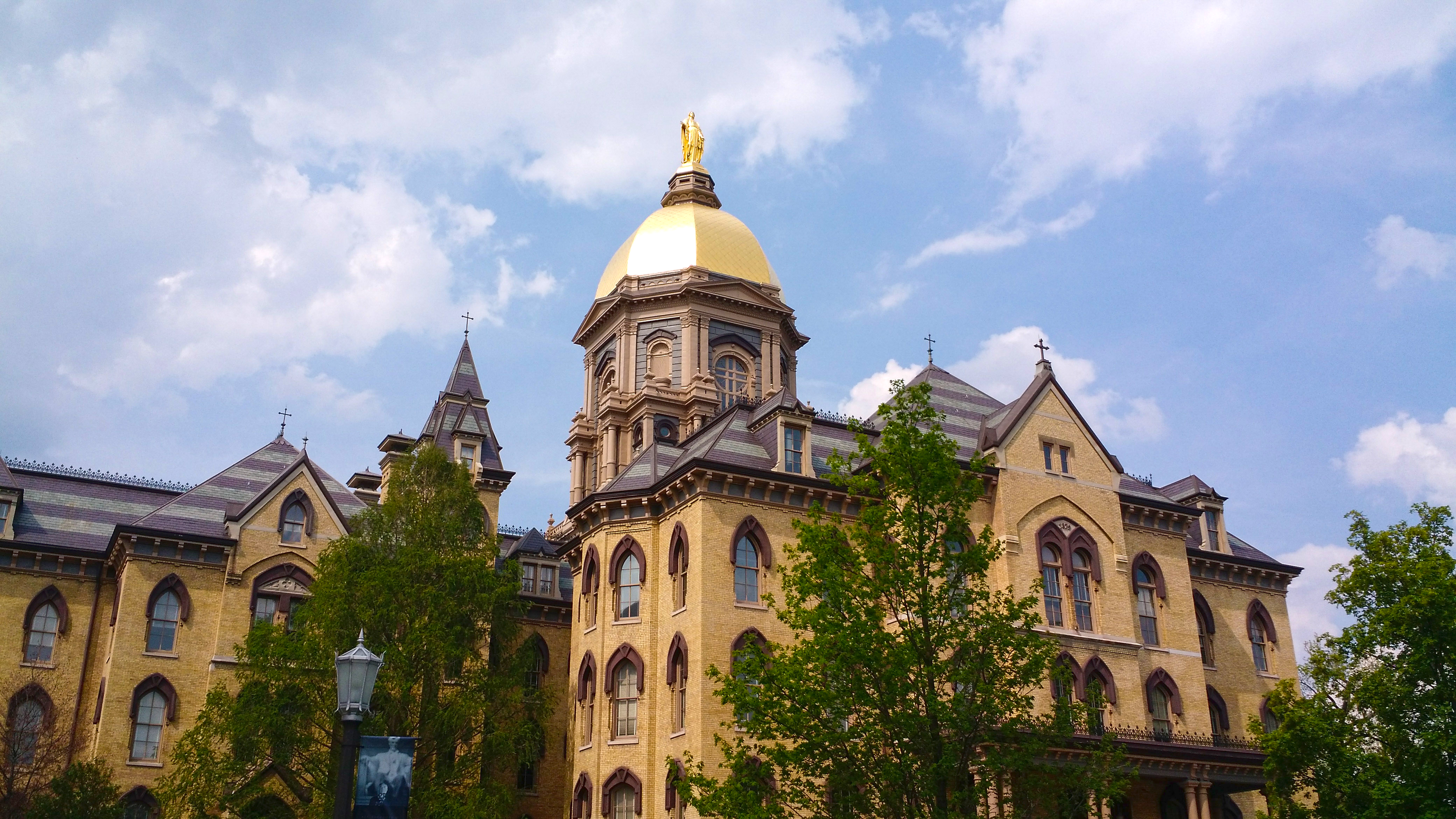
The University of Notre Dame holds an endowment of $18 billion, the largest in Indiana.

== History ==
According to William J. Reese, Indiana followed the pattern of reform movements that originated in New England, and was brought to Indiana by Yankee Presbyterians in the northern half of the state. South of Indianapolis the arrivals from the Southern states considered education a private affair, with wealthy families supporting tutors. Before 1860 nearly all schooling was private. Across the state Presbyterian and other Protestant churches set up Sunday Schools that provided basic training in reading, writing, arithmetic and piety.

Reform efforts included building support for common schools funded by local taxes, the development of city schools, and curricula designed by professional educators. Reforms during the 1880s to 1920s included high schools, manual training and vocational education in the high schools, and controversies regarding control of rural schools between the farmer parents and the centralizers in the county seat. By the late 20th century, new efforts to reform public education agitated the state.

=== Early attempts ===
The Jefferson Academy was founded in 1801 as a public university for the Indiana Territory, and was reincorporated as Vincennes University in 1806, the first in the state.

The 1816 Indiana Constitution in Article 8, Section 1 states:

Knowledge and learning, generally diffused throughout a community, being essential to the preservation of a free government; it shall be the duty of the General Assembly to encourage, by all suitable means, moral, intellectual, scientific, and agricultural improvement; and to provide, by law, for a general and uniform system of Common Schools, wherein tuition shall be without charge, and equally open to all."

It took decades for the legislature to begin to fulfill its promise.

The 1820s saw the start in a few places of free public township schools, locally funded by taxes. During the administration of William Hendricks, a plot of ground was set aside in each township for the construction of a schoolhouse. Indiana lagged the rest of the Midwest with the lowest literacy and education rates into the early 20th century.

=== Caleb Mills ===
Caleb Mills (1806–1879) was a Presbyterian Yankee who served as the Superintendent of Public Instruction in Indiana and was the first faculty member at Wabash College. He played a central role in promoting the public education system of Indiana.

Mills arrived in Crawfordsville in 1833 after graduating from Dartmouth College in New Hampshire and Andover Theological Seminary in Massachusetts. He became the first professor and the principal of the Crawfordsville Classical High School, which opened in December 1833 with 12 students. As soon as a charter could be obtained from the state legislature it became the Wabash Teachers Seminary and Manual Labor College, finally acquiring the name Wabash College in 1851. Mills was recruited to the job by his old college roommate Edmund Otis Hovey, one of the nine founders of the school, who later joined him on the faculty as one of the professors. At first Mills taught all the classes in every subject.

The state held a referendum on public schools in May 1848. Northern Indiana voted 64% in favor, while Southern Indiana voted 51% against. The most enthusiastic support came from the Whig strongholds, led by St. Joseph County (South Bend) on the Michigan border, with 94% voting in favor. Mills played a major role in preparing materials that pro-school editors included in their newspapers. The legislature passed a law in 1849 enabling but not requiring the establishment of public schools. The loophole was closed in the new state constitution of 1851, and the new school law of 1852 finally required all counties to create free public schools.

Starting in 1846, for six years, Mills wrote an annual address to the Indiana legislature on the subject of public education. These very long letters argued for a statewide system of taxpayer funded free public schools. He made the case that the benefits of a "good and efficient system of free schools" would pay for themselves, and described the parts that would be needed for such a system, including township school committees, district superintendents, school libraries, and normal schools to train teachers. These addresses were printed in the Indiana State Journal under the byline "One of the People", and were the main influence on the new school law, embracing most of Mills' proposals, which was drafted and adopted by the state constitutional convention in 1852.

In 1854 Mills was elected Indiana Superintendent of Public Instruction, defeating the incumbent Democrat, William C. Larrabee, 99,857 to 85,835. Mills, a Whig, ran on a fusion ticket called the People's Party which brought together modernizers from the Whigs, Free Soilers, Know-Nothings and temperance advocates to support a common slate. Traditionalists supported the Democrats but they lost. Mills, after serving one term, did not stand for re-election in 1856 and Larrabee regained the office. Larrabee was a Yankee and a professor of mathematics at Asbury College; he agreed with Mills on the need to modernize the schools. They were followed by a series of state superintendents of public instruction who aggressively promoted public schools. However, in the 1850s their work was repeatedly frustrated by the state supreme court, which nullified key parts of the school laws. After 1865 the progress of building public schools resumed.

=== Higher education ===
For a list of institutions, see Category:Universities and colleges in Indiana.

The state government chartered Indiana University in Bloomington in 1820 as the State Seminary. Construction began in 1822, the first professor was hired in 1823, and classes began in 1824. Enrollment in 1890 was only 400, but it grew to 3200 in 1919. Its national reputation was weak until the late 1930s, when president Herman B Wells (1937–2000) started to build a national reputation for research. Purdue University was founded in 1869 in West Lafayette as the state's land-grant university, a school of science, engineering and agriculture. Enrollment grew from 849 in 1900 to 2605 in 1919. Purdue for the first half of the 20th century boasted the largest enrollment of any engineering school in the country. It battled IU for years over who would run a medical school, and finally its rival won control of the medical school in Indianapolis.

Other state colleges were established for specialized needs. They included Indiana State University, established in Terre Haute in 1865 as the state normal school for training teachers. Ball State University was founded as a normal school in the early 20th century and given to the state in 1918.

Public colleges lagged behind the private religious colleges in both size and educational standards until the 1890s. In 1855, North Western Christian University [now Butler University] was chartered by Ovid Butler after a split with the Christian Church Disciples of Christ over slavery. Significantly the university was founded on the basis of anti-slavery and co-education. It was one of the first to admit African Americans and one of the first to have a named chair for female professors, the Demia Butler Chair in English. Asbury College (now Depauw University) was Methodist. Wabash College was Presbyterian. The Northern Indiana Vocational School became Valparaiso University in 1907. Its cheap tuition attracted 5000 students as the largest school in Indiana. It fell apart in the 1920s and the campus was sold to the Lutherans who still operate it. The University of Notre Dame, founded by Rev Edward Sorin in 1842, emerged as the most prominent Catholic school in the country, thanks in large part to football under Knute Rockne.

=== Basketball ===
Indiana did not invent basketball but it pioneered in adding it to the high school curriculum, using it to build rural support for hundreds of small new rural high schools. Hundreds and even thousands of supporters packed the bleachers to cheer the local team.

Black students largely attended racially segregated schools, especially in Indianapolis and Gary. Although official segregation ended in the 1940s, in practice the great majority of blacks attended schools that were overwhelmingly black. Starting in 1941 all-black high schools were allowed in the basketball tournaments. One unexpected result was that whites in Indianapolis cheered Oscar Robertson and the all-black Crispus Attucks High School in winning the state basketball championship in 1955 and 1956 under coach Ray Crowe.

== Current ==
=== Public schools ===
Indiana's 1816 constitution was the first in the country to implement a state-funded public school system. It also allotted one township for a public university. However, the plan turned out to be far too idealistic for a pioneer society, as tax money was not accessible for its organization. In the 1840s, Caleb Mills pressed the need for tax-supported schools, and in 1851 his advice was included in the new state constitution. In 1843 the Legislature ruled that African Americans could not attend the public schools, leading to the foundation of Union Literary Institute and other schools for them, funded by donations or the students themselves. The Indiana General Assembly authorized separate but equal schools for Black students in 1869, and in 1877 language in the law changed to allow for integrated schools.

Although the growth of the public school system was held up by legal entanglements, many public elementary schools were in use by 1870. Most children in Indiana attend public schools, but nearly ten percent attend private schools and parochial schools. About half of all college students in Indiana are enrolled in state-supported four-year schools.

Indiana public schools have gone through several changes throughout Indiana's history. Modern, public school standards, have been implemented all throughout the state. These new standards were adopted in April 2014. The overall goal of these new state standards is to ensure Indiana students have the necessary skills and requirements needed to enter college or the workforce upon high school graduation. State standards can be found for nearly every major subject taught in Indiana public schools. Mathematics, English/Language Arts, Science, and Social Studies are among the top, prioritized standards. In 2022, the Indiana Department of Education reported that the state's overall graduation rate was 86.7%, down one percent from 2021.

The rate of Indiana high school students attending college fell to 53% in 2022, a significant decline from 65% in 2017. Indiana's college-going rates have fallen further than most states'. Trends reveal widening gaps for ethnic minorities and low-income families.

=== Vocational schools ===
Indiana has a strong vocational school system. Charles Allen Prossor, known as the father of vocational education in the United States, was from New Albany. The Charles Allen Prosser School of Technology is named in his honor. There are vocational schools in every region of Indiana, and most Indiana students can freely attend a vocational school during their high school years and receive training and job placement assistance in trade jobs. The International Union Of Operating Engineers (IUOE) has seven local unions in Indiana, offering apprenticeship and training opportunities. According to the Electrical Training Alliance website, there are ten electrical training centers in Indiana.

=== Colleges and universities ===
The state's community college system, Ivy Tech Community College of Indiana, serves nearly 200,000 students annually, making it the state's largest public post-secondary educational institution and the nation's largest singly accredited statewide community college system. In 2008, the Indiana University system agreed to shift most of its associate (2-year) degrees to the Ivy Tech Community College System.

Indiana University is a multi-campus university system. Its flagship campus at Bloomington began as the Indiana Seminary in 1820. Indiana State University was established in Terre Haute as the state's Normal School in 1865. Purdue University was chartered in West Lafayette as the state's land-grant university in 1869 and is also now a multi-campus institution. The three other independent state universities are Vincennes University (founded in 1801 by the Indiana Territory), Ball State University (founded 1918 as the East Division of Indiana State), and the University of Southern Indiana (founded 1965 as the Evansville campus of Indiana State).

Many of Indiana's private colleges and universities are affiliated with religious denominations. The University of Notre Dame, Marian University, and the University of Saint Francis are Catholic. Universities affiliated with Protestant denominations include Anderson University, Butler University, Huntington University, Manchester University, Indiana Wesleyan University, Taylor University, Franklin College, Hanover College, DePauw University, Earlham College, Valparaiso University, University of Indianapolis, and University of Evansville.

The state has several universities ranked among the best by U.S. News & World Report. The University of Notre Dame ranks among the top 20, Purdue University among the top 50, and Indiana University Bloomington among the top 100. Indiana University–Purdue University Indianapolis (IUPUI) has recently made it into the top 200 U.S. News & World Report rankings. Butler, Valparaiso, and the University of Evansville are ranked among the top ten in the Regional University Midwest Rankings. Purdue's engineering programs are ranked fourth in the country. In addition, Taylor University is ranked first in the Regional College Midwest Rankings and Rose-Hulman Institute of Technology has been considered the nation's top undergraduate engineering school for 25 consecutive years.

The state is also home to the largest medical school system in the country (the Indiana University School of Medicine) and a smaller, osteopathic medical school (the Marian University College of Osteopathic Medicine). In addition, Indiana boasts one veterinary medical school (the Purdue College of Veterinary Medicine), one optometry school (Indiana University School of Optometry), three pharmacy schools (the Purdue College of Pharmacy, Butler College of Pharmacy and Health Sciences, and the Manchester College of Pharmacy, Natural, and Health Sciences) and four law schools (IU Maurer School of Law, IU McKinney School of Law, Notre Dame Law School, and Purdue Global Law School).

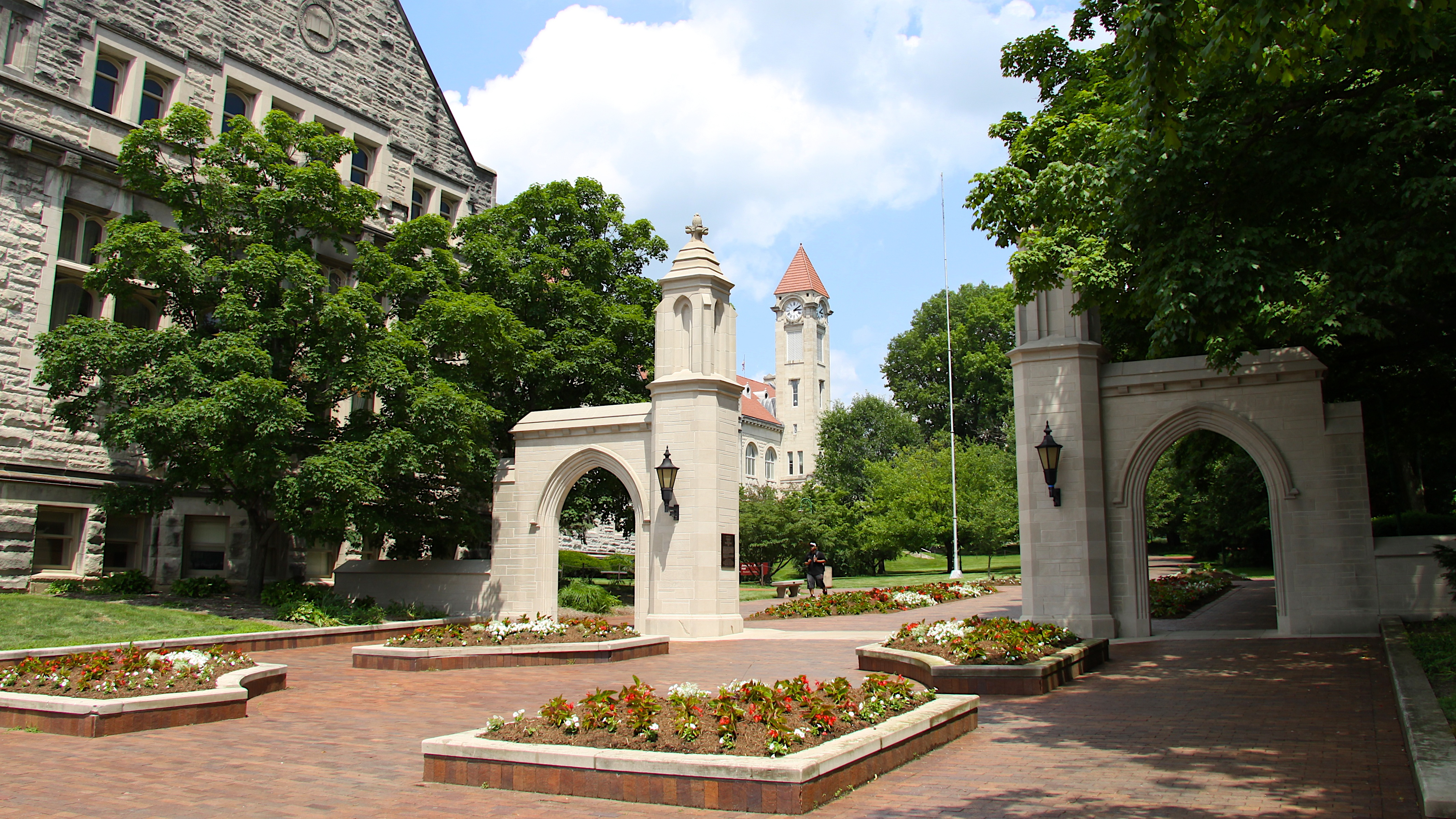
Indiana University Bloomington. The public Indiana University system enrolls 114,160 students.

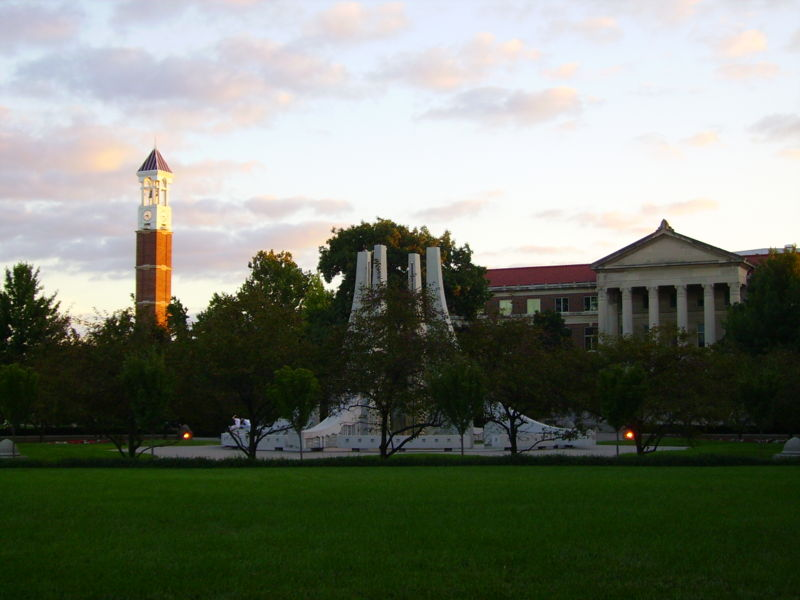
Purdue University. The public Purdue University system enrolls 67,596 students, not including Purdue Global.
