= 2008 Indiana Superintendent of Public Instruction election =

- November 4, 2008
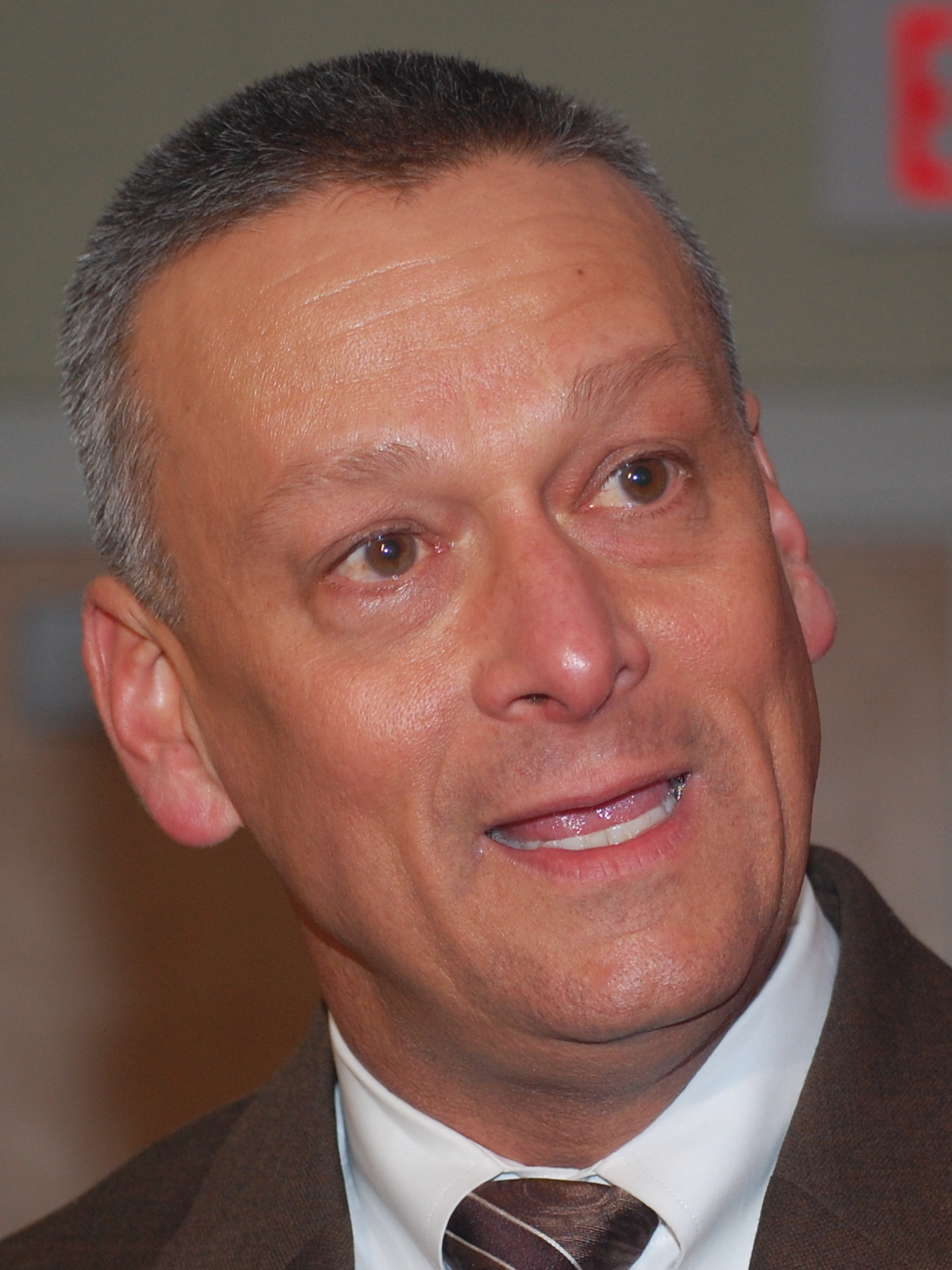

Candidate	Tony Bennett	Richard Wood
Party	Republican	Democratic
Popular vote	1,294,833	1,243,693
Percentage	51.00%	48.99%
- County results Bennett: 50–60% 60–70% 70–80% Wood: 50–60% 60–70%
Superintendent before election
Suellen Reed
Republican
Elected Superintendent
Tony Bennett
Republican

The 2008 Indiana Superintendent of Public Instruction election was held on November 4, 2008, to elect the Indiana Superintendent of Public Instruction to a four-year term. Incumbent Republican Suellen Reed retired and was succeeded by Republican Tony Bennett.

== Republican primary ==
=== Candidates ===
==== Nominee ====
- Tony Bennett, superintendent of Greater Clark County Schools

==== Declined ====
- Suellen Reed, incumbent superintendent

== Democratic primary ==
=== Candidates ===
==== Nominee ====
- Richard Wood, former superintendent of Tippecanoe School Corporation

== General election ==
=== Results ===
2008 Indiana Superintendent of Public Instruction election
Party	Candidate	Votes	%
Republican	Tony Bennett	1,294,833	51.00
Democratic	Richard D. Wood	1,243,693	48.99
Democratic	Kevin R. Brown (write-in)	180	00.01
Total votes		2,538,706	100.00
