= Caleb Mills =

American education administrator (1806–1879)

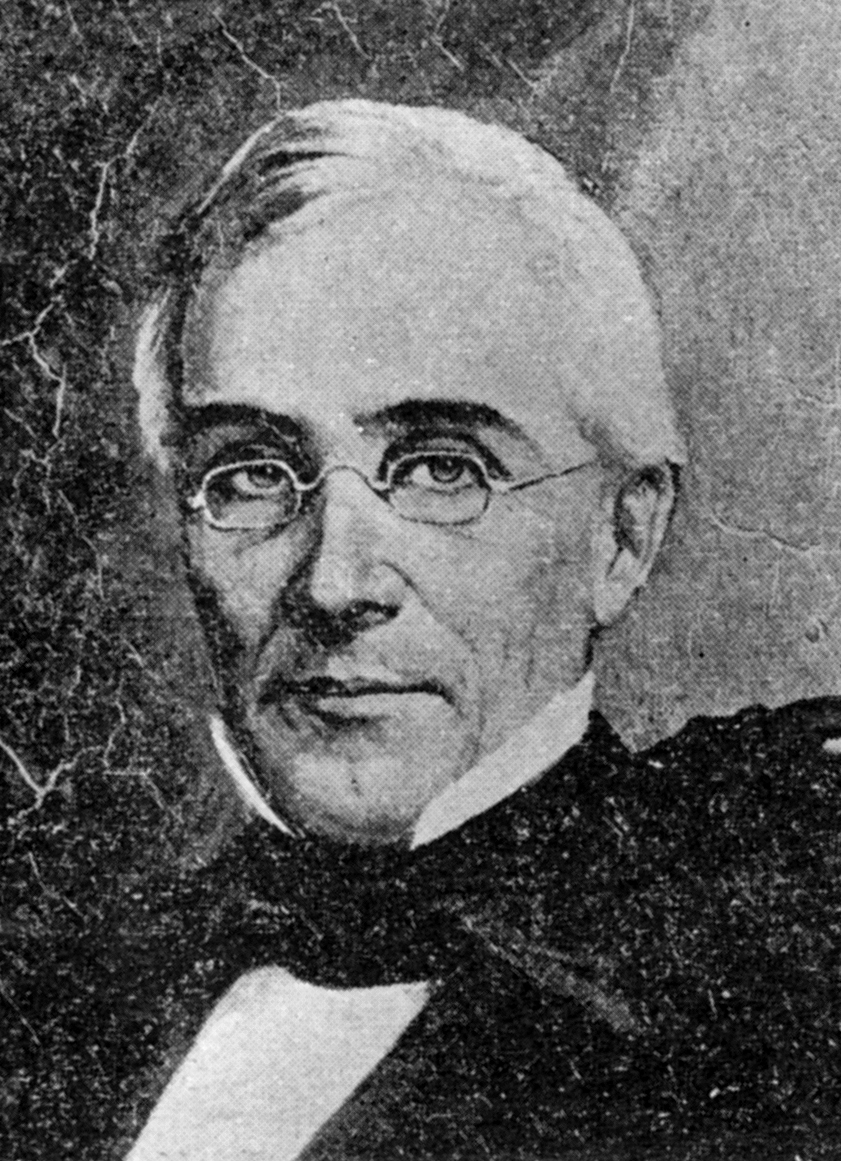
Caleb Mills from Who-When-What Book, 1900

Caleb Mills (July 28, 1806 – October 16, 1879) was an American educator who served as the Superintendent of Public Instruction in Indiana and was the first faculty member at Wabash College. He played a central role in designing the public education system of Indiana.

== Career ==
Caleb Mills arrived in Crawfordsville, Indiana, in November 1833 with his bride Sarah, after graduating from Dartmouth College in 1828 and Andover Theological Seminary in 1833, to become the first professor and the principal of the Crawfordsville Classical High School, which opened in December 1833 with 12 students. As soon as a charter could be obtained from the state legislature it became the Wabash Teachers Seminary and Manual Labor College, finally acquiring the name Wabash College in 1851 (Osborne 1932, p. 31). Mills, fresh out of divinity school, was recruited to the job by his old college roommate Edmund Otis Hovey, one of the nine founders of the school, who later joined him on the faculty as one of the professors. In the early days it was Mills' task as the sole teacher to teach all the classes in every subject, and additionally to serve as the pastor of a church six miles outside of town on weekends.

Starting in 1846, for six years, Mills wrote an annual address to the Indiana legislature on the subject of public education. In these letters, arguing for a statewide system of taxpayer funded free public schools, he made the case that the benefits of a "good and efficient system of free schools" would pay for themselves, and described the parts that would be needed for such a system, including township school committees, district superintendents, school libraries, and normal schools to train teachers. These addresses were printed in the Indiana State Journal under the byline "One of the People", and were the main influence on the new school law, embracing most of Mills' proposals, which was drafted and adopted by the state constitutional convention in 1852.

In 1854 Caleb Mills was elected Indiana Superintendent of Public Instruction, defeating the incumbent Democrat, William C. Larrabee, 99,857 to 85,835. Mills, a Whig, ran on a fusion ticket called the People's Party which brought together Whigs, Free Soilers, Know-Nothings and temperance advocates to support a common slate. Mills, after serving one term, did not stand for re-election in 1856 and Larrabee regained the office.

Mills remained on the faculty of Wabash College, teaching Greek and serving as curator of the college library, until his death in 1879 (Osborne 1932, p. 144).

Indiana State University has recognized Mills' immeasurable contributions to education in Indiana by naming one of their residence halls for Mills. In addition, the highest university honor an Indiana State faculty member can receive is the Caleb Mills Teaching Award.

== See also ==
- Education in Indiana
