= 2008 Indiana Attorney General election =

- November 4, 2008
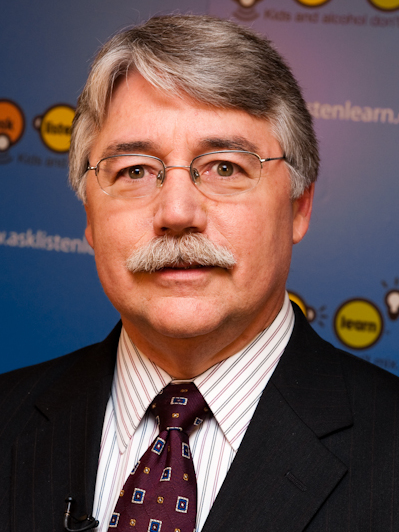

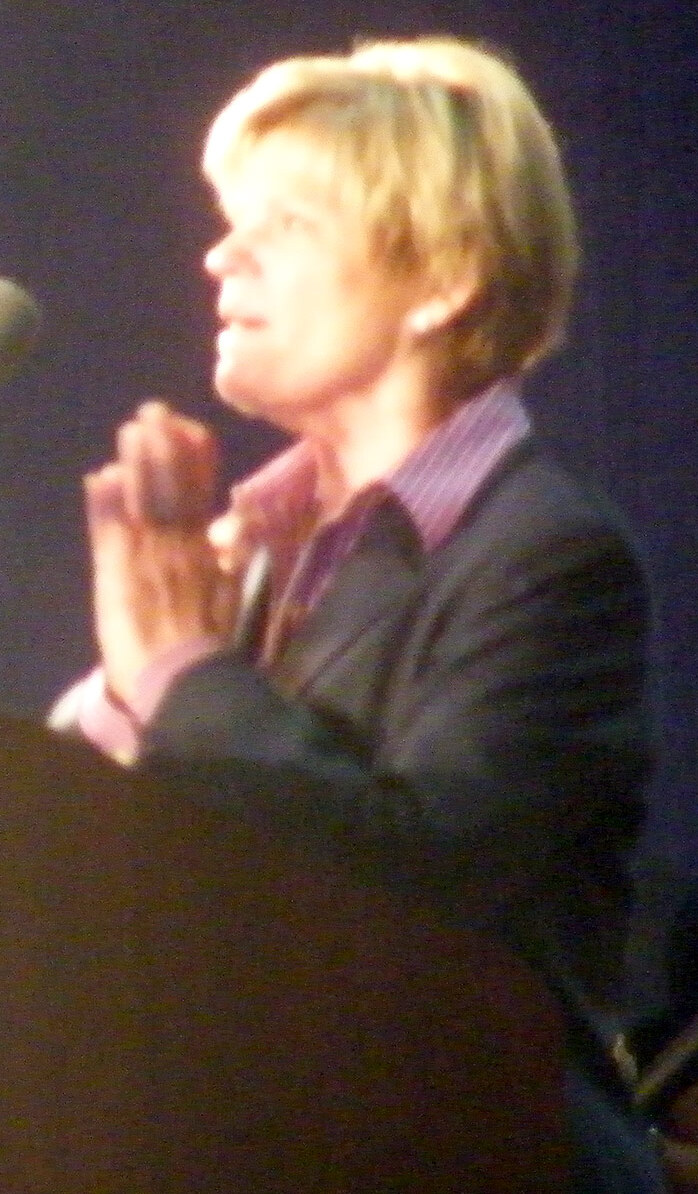
Candidate	Greg Zoeller	Linda Pence
Party	Republican	Democratic
Popular vote	1,318,147	1,279,284
Percentage	50.75%	49.25%
- Zoeller: 50–60% 60–70% Pence: 50–60% 60–70%
Attorney General before election
Steve Carter
Republican
Elected Attorney General
Greg Zoeller
Republican

The 2008 Indiana attorney general election was held on November 4, 2008, to elect the Indiana attorney general. Incumbent Republican Steve Carter chose to retire rather than seek a third term. Republican nominee Chief Deputy Attorney General of Indiana Greg Zoeller won the election by a narrow margin, defeating Democratic attorney Linda Pence by 1.5 percentage points.

As of 2026, this is the last Indiana attorney general election to be decided by less than 15 percentage points.

== Republican convention ==
=== Candidates ===
==== Nominee ====
- Greg Zoeller, chief deputy attorney general of Indiana (2001–2009)

==== Eliminated at convention ====
- Jon Costas, mayor of Valparaiso, Indiana (2004–2020)

=== Endorsements ===
Greg Zoeller
- Steve Carter, Indiana attorney general (2001–2009)
Jon Costas
- Mitch Daniels, governor of Indiana (2005–2013)

==== Results ====
Republican convention results
Candidate	Round 1	
Candidate	Votes	%
Greg Zoeller	1,061	60.01
Jon Costas	707	39.99
Total ballots	1,768	100.00

== Democratic convention ==
=== Candidates ===
==== Nominee ====
- Linda Pence, attorney

==== Results ====
Pence was unopposed for the Democratic nomination.

== General election ==
=== Candidates ===
- Linda Pence, attorney (Democratic)
- Greg Zoeller, chief deputy attorney general of Indiana (2001–2009) (Republican)

=== Polling ===
Source	Date	Linda Pence (D)	Greg Zoeller (R)	Undecided
Howey/Gauge	October 23–24, 2008	24%	30%	–
Public Policy Polling (D)	October 31 – November 2, 2008	44%	44%	12%

=== Results ===
2008 Indiana attorney general election results
Party	Candidate	Votes	%	±%
Republican	Greg Zoeller	1,318,147	50.75%	−7.43%
Democratic	Linda Pence	1,279,284	49.25%	+9.33%
Total votes		2,597,431	100.00%	
Republican hold				
