= Indiana Department of Education =

State government agency in Indiana

The Indiana Department of Education (IDOE) oversees primary and secondary education in the U.S. state of Indiana. The department is managed by the Indiana Superintendent of Public Instruction, an elected office most recently held by Jennifer McCormick until January, 2021. The Superintendent serves as voting member and the chair of the Indiana State Board of Education, an eleven-member body with its ten other members appointed by the Governor of Indiana. The board sets statewide school policy and has limited control over curriculum.

The department's offices are located in Suite 600 of the South Tower of Indianapolis.
