= 2000 Indiana Attorney General election =

- November 7, 2000

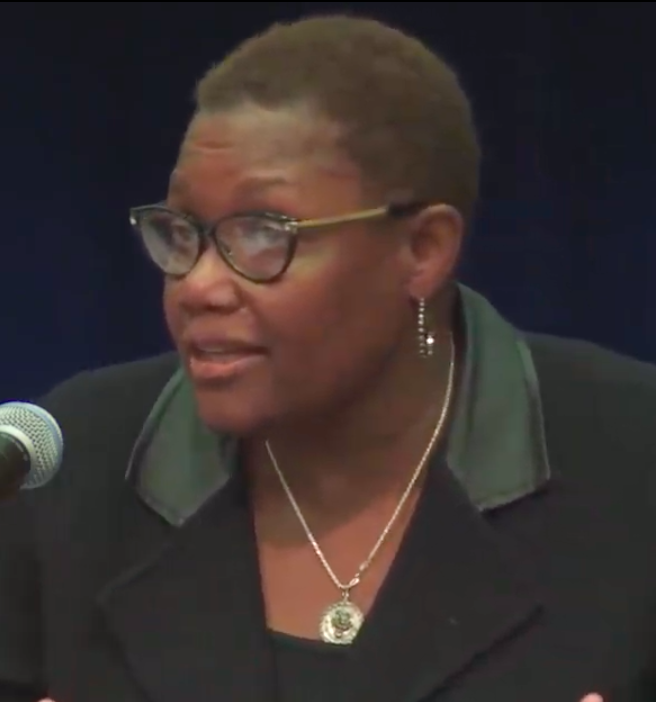
Candidate	Steve Carter	Karen Freeman-Wilson
Party	Republican	Democratic
Popular vote	1,077,961	978,713
Percentage	51.28%	46.56%
- Carter: 40–50% 50–60% 60–70% 70–80% Freeman-Wilson: 40–50% 50–60% 60–70%
Attorney General before election
Karen Freeman-Wilson
Democratic
Elected Attorney General
Steve Carter
Republican

The 2000 Indiana Attorney General election was held on November 7, 2000, to elect the Indiana Attorney General. Democratic incumbent Karen Freeman-Wilson, who was appointed following Jeff Modisett's resignation, ran for election to a full term but lost to Republican attorney and 1996 nominee for this seat Steve Carter by four percentage points.

== General election ==
=== Candidates ===
- Steve Carter, attorney and 1996 Republican nominee for Indiana Attorney General (Republican)
- Karen Freeman-Wilson, incumbent Indiana Attorney General (2000–2001) (Democratic)
- N. Sean Harshey (Libertarian)

=== Results ===
2000 Indiana Attorney General election results
Party	Candidate	Votes	%	±%
Republican	Steve Carter	1,077,961	51.28%	+2.63%
Democratic	Karen Freeman-Wilson	978,713	46.56%	−4.79%
Libertarian	N. Sean Harshey	45,490	2.16%	N/A
Total votes		2,102,164	100.00%	
Republican gain from Democratic				
