= 2012 Indiana Attorney General election =

- November 6, 2012
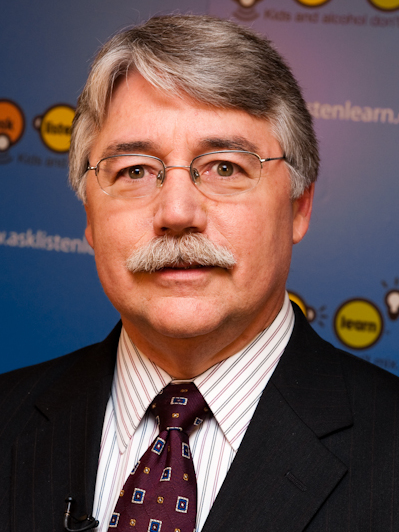

Candidate	Greg Zoeller	Kay Fleming
Party	Republican	Democratic
Popular vote	1,453,334	1,051,504
Percentage	58.02%	41.98%
- County results Zoeller: 50–60% 60–70% 70–80% Fleming: 50–60% 60–70%
Attorney General before election
Greg Zoeller
Republican
Elected Attorney General
Greg Zoeller
Republican

The 2012 Indiana Attorney General election was held on November 6, 2012, to elect the Indiana Attorney General. Republican incumbent Greg Zoeller won re-election to a second term, defeating Democratic attorney Kay Fleming by a wide margin of sixteen percentage points.

== Republican convention ==
=== Candidates ===
==== Nominee ====
- Greg Zoeller, incumbent Indiana Attorney General (2009–2017)

=== Results ===
Zoeller was unopposed for renomination.

== Democratic convention ==
=== Candidates ===
==== Nominee ====
- Kay Fleming, attorney

=== Results ===
Fleming was unopposed for the Democratic nomination.

== General election ==
=== Candidates ===
- Greg Zoeller, incumbent Indiana Attorney General (2009–2017) (Republican)
- Kay Fleming, attorney (Democratic)

=== Results ===
2012 Indiana Attorney General election results
Party	Candidate	Votes	%	±%
Republican	Greg Zoeller	1,453,334	58.02%	+7.27%
Democratic	Kay Fleming	1,051,504	41.98%	−7.27%
Total votes		2,504,838	100.00%	
Republican hold				
