= Charles A. Appel =

FBI Special Agent (1895–1981)

Charles A. Appel Jr. (August 23, 1895 – October 16, 1981), known as the founder of the Federal Bureau of Investigation (FBI) Laboratory, was an FBI Special Agent from 1924 through 1948. Assigned in 1929 by then-Bureau of Investigation Director J. Edgar Hoover to coordinate outside experts for forensic examinations, Appel became the Bureau's one-man forensic laboratory in 1931. In November 1932, the FBI's Technical Laboratory was formally established. In August 1933, he began processing evidence and testifying on handwriting, typewriting, fingerprints, ballistics, and chemicals submitted by U.S. police agencies. Appel was joined in late 1933 by Special Agent Samuel F. Pickering, a chemist, and in 1934, by Special Agents Ivan W. Conrad and Donald J. Parsons, also scientists. In September 1934, the FBI Laboratory came to widespread attention due to Appel's identification of Bruno Hauptmann as the kidnapper of Charles Lindbergh Jr., from hand-written ransom demand notes.

As the Laboratory grew, Appel specialized in document examination and testimony in thousands of cases, including gangsters, kidnappers, World War II spies, and fraudsters until his retirement in December 1948. He then practiced as a civil questioned documents expert until his death in October 1981.

== Early life and education ==
Charles A. Appel Jr. was born in Washington, D.C., on August 23, 1895, to Charles A. Appel II (1871–1954), who became Chief Auditor of IRS, and Delsie Bennit Appel (1909–1976). Two brothers, William Dunford Appel and Frederick Whipple Appel, became scientists at the National Bureau of Standards and U. S. Public Health Service, respectively. From childhood, Charles (known as "Charlie" and in the FBI as "Uncle Charlie") played the violin. He graduated from Washington D.C.'s McKinley Manual Training School in January 1914, where he played violin with its high school orchestra. He worked for the Smithsonian Institution's exhibit at the Panama–Pacific Exhibition in San Francisco, California, in 1915. In Dallas, Texas, he worked as an electrician and dispatcher in 1916 and 1917 for Texas Power and Light Company.

In 1918, he enlisted as a cadet in the U.S. Army Air Corps and trained as a pilot for service in World War I, which ended before his deployment to Europe. He attended Georgetown University Law School, Washington, D.C., in 1919–1922 while working full-time at the Federal Board for Vocational Education (FBVE). He played violin regularly with Washington's Own Opera Company orchestra. After graduating in 1922, he was admitted to the District of Columbia Bar. He practiced law and continued employment with the FBVE until its defunding by Congress in 1923.

== Career ==
=== Bureau of Investigation ===
Appel was appointed a Bureau of Investigation Special Agent in October 1924. He served in field offices in Detroit, Michigan, Nashville, Tennessee, and Dallas, Texas. He was promoted to Bureau headquarters in 1928 and became Chief of Division 4 in 1929. To solve a multi-million-dollar bankruptcy fraud case involving officers of the commercial real estate F. H. Smith Co., he engaged document forgery expert Albert S. Osborn. Trials resulted in the 1930 convictions of several prominent co-conspirators for fraud, embezzlement and using forged documents at trial.

Appel urged Director Hoover to establish the Bureau's own forensic laboratory. From April 13 to May 8, 1931, Appel attended the concentrated forensics course for law enforcement at the Northwestern University Law School's Scientific Crime Laboratory, headed by Colonel/Doctor Calvin Goddard. In 1931 and 1932, Appel acted as the Bureau's sole forensic coordinator and evidence examiner in numerous cases of gangster kidnappings, robberies, police bribery, human trafficking, and slayings of law enforcement officers.

On March 1, 1932, the 20-month-old son of the celebrated pilot Colonel Charles Lindbergh was kidnapped from his second-story nursery at home in Hopewell, N.J. Thirteen ransom notes demanded $50,000 for the infant's safe return. The Bureau coordinated the federal response, assisting New Jersey State and New York City Police. The Congress quickly passed the Lindbergh Law, making interstate kidnapping and extortion illegal. After the ransom was paid and the baby was found dead in May 1932, the kidnapper was hunted through ransom money that appeared around the New York City area. Appel and his colleagues conducted thousands of examinations on such evidence as suspect writings and gold certificate currency from the ransom payment. A telltale $10 bill led to the arrest of a suspect, Bruno Hauptmann, on September 19, 1934, by a task force of New York City police, Bureau agents and New Jersey State Police. From handwriting found on Hauptmann's person and other samples, Appel identified him as the writer of all the ransom notes, and testified, resulting in his indictment. Other evidence, including ransom gold-certificate currency, and a home-made ladder used in the crime, was presented at his murder trial in New Jersey. Hauptmann was convicted, sentenced to death, and after appeals failed, eventually executed. Appel's handwriting exhibits are still used as examples of effective questioned document examinations.

In a July 7, 1932, memorandum to Hoover, Appel proposed and the Director approved "a separate division" within the Bureau where "the criminological research laboratory could be placed." In another memo two weeks later, Appel outlined his vision for the laboratory: "I believe the Bureau should be the central clearing house for all information which may be needed in the criminological work and that all police departments in the future will look to the Bureau for information of this kind as a routine thing…" In September 1932, equipment and supplies were moved into the first lab space in room 802 of the Old Southern Railway Building (until then used as a break room) at 13th Street and Pennsylvania Avenue, N.W., Washington, D.C. The Bureau formally established its Technical Laboratory on November 24, 1932, with Appel continuing as its sole examiner.

Appel studied forensics literature, methodology and European methods. Guided by U.S. National Bureau of Standards Scientist Wilmer Souder and Northwestern University's Col./Dr. Calvin Goddard, Appel progressed to the role of an examiner by 1933. His forensics lectures and practical exercises for Bureau agents and police resulted in increased use of crime scene evidence in cases. Hoover publicized and advocated its use by U.S. police.

In August 1933, the FBI Technical Laboratory began accepting evidence submitted by U.S. law enforcement agencies for examination and testimony by the Bureau. In the first 11 months of formal operation, the Laboratory conducted 963 examinations, most of which involved handwriting in extortion cases. With a rapidly increasing workload, in December 1933, Hoover assigned Special Agent Samuel F. Pickering, who specialized in chemical analysis, to work in the Lab. In the spring of 1934, two more Special Agents, Ivan W. Conrad and Donald J. Parsons, joined the Lab. In early 1934, Appel produced the monograph Scientific Aids in Criminal Investigations, an important milestone in the establishment of police laboratory practices.

As the 1930s progressed, the Lab expanded and was renamed the FBI Laboratory in 1935. By 1941, 100 examiners processed 39,000 exemplars in 7,000 cases. Appel focused his work on questioned documents in what became the Lab's Document Section.

Thousands of Appel's examinations resulted in grand jury and trial testimony, including notorious gangsters in 1930s kidnapping and robbery cases. From 1936-39, Appel set up and ran a field laboratory in the basement of the Kansas City, MO federal building, examining and testifying to altered and fraudulent ballots seized by federal agents after the 1936 elections. The Kansas City Vote Fraud cases resulted in 39 indictments, 278 defendants, 259 convictions, 19 dismissals and no acquittals of election officials and members of the Thomas Pendergast political and organized criminal organization. Appel testified in every trial.

Prior to and during World War II, Appel helped convict Nazi German spies including Guenther Rumrich and three confederates, and the Frederick "Fritz" Joubert Duquesne spy ring with over 33 members, of whom 14 pled innocent and were convicted due to a complex double-agent operation. Forensic evidence included spy devices, documents, secret writing, typewriting and microphotographs.

Appel's World War II work also centered on investigation of intercepted letters with secret writing in invisible ink sent by Nazi agents in the U.S., Central and South America to German intelligence mail-drop addresses in Spain and other European locations. The Kurt Frederick Ludwig Nazi spy ring in New York City was uncovered, and prosecution of members resulted in three guilty pleas and six convictions in March 1942. Decoding of intercepted messages posed another challenge for the Document and Cryptography Sections of the Lab. For many espionage cases, the Lab collaborated with Britain's Foreign Intelligence Service and Counterintelligence Service, MI6 and MI5. In the Velvalee Dickinson case, Appel identified her "open code," typewritten communications with Japanese intelligence, resulting in her 1944 conviction.

Many of Appel's postwar cases involved examinations and testimony in fraud, check forgery, murder, vote fraud and Cold War espionage cases. He retired from the FBI on December 31, 1948.

=== Post-FBI career ===
In retirement, Appel opened a civil document examination practice at home in Washington, D.C., with his wife, Mary C. Appel, who had served as a Document Examiner in the FBI Laboratory. Until his death in October 1981, he conducted examinations, qualified in courts and testified in every State of the United States except Hawaii, and in Pakistan and in Puerto Rico in person, and by deposition in European and South American countries.

Many of Appel's questioned document cases generated public interest in forgeries, disputed wills, union and election vote fraud, and identifying anonymous writers. Though he sought to avoid criminal cases so as not to oppose law enforcement experts, he took several cases to prevent a miscarriage of justice, including the Clay Shaw case, refusing fees. Two judicial rulings set important precedents. In one, an appeals court awarded Appel fees from a lawyer who claimed it was not he, but his client who owed Appel for expert services. In the other, Appel testified as a neutral expert after a 1950s $1.5 million disputed-will verdict where four handwriting experts had billed the winning side $89,000 for services. The court agreed with Appel that the experts' claim to exorbitant payment for "quantum merit" made them advocates, rather than providing objective and scientific testimony. The judge ruled that they were entitled to $250 per day for their work.

Appel found himself at odds with some private-practice document examiners and other expert witnesses in his time. In law journal articles, lectures and court testimony, he declared that a provider of scientific evidence must be objective and unbiased, and never take a "contingency fee" or additional compensation from the side that won a case. He said that experts with a stake in the outcome of a case become an advocate, and scientific integrity is compromised. Some other forensic practitioners of his time accepted higher fees for winning. Appel's integrity ran so deep that a manuscript on how to detect forgeries and examine questioned documents remained unpublished after his death, because he feared that it would be a primer for forgers.

== Personal life ==
Charles A. Appel Jr. spent his youth in Washington, D.C., where he was born August 23, 1895. He was the son of Charles A. Appel II (1871–1954), Chief Auditor at IRS, and Delsie Bennit Appel, and grandson of Charles A. Appel the First (1836–1910), a Major in the Civil War who became a well-known government builder, veteran advocate and Republican politician.

Appel played the violin in grade school, for the McKinley Technical High School orchestra and the Washington's Own Opera Company. He competed in formation marching with McKinley's uniformed cadet corps, which won city-wide awards. As a 16-year-old in 1911, he contracted typhoid fever from tainted milk, and survived when he was one of the first two patients given a new antitoxin.

He became a long-term member of D.C.'s Masonic Lodge, like his father and grandfather. He invented a device to protect the signatures on checks, and was granted Patent No. 1,384,584 on July 12, 1921.

Appel's first wife, Lasalia McCaffrey (1898–1931), was tragically struck and killed by a drunk driver while crossing the street in January 1931 in front of her two sons, Charles and William, then six and four years old. A second marriage in 1935 to Jean Slater, a professional musician, ended in a Nevada divorce in August 1941.

Appel's third wife, Mary A. Cullen of Scranton, Pennsylvania (1922–1999), a graduate of Trinity College, Washington, D.C., at age 19, was employed as a night-shift clerk at the FBI while attending law school in 1942. She was one of the first two women to become Document Examiners in the Laboratory, and was assigned to work with Appel in 1942. In May 1945, they married and had five children, Edward, Mary Ann, Peter, Margaret and Paul. After 35 years of marriage, when Charles died of a heart attack in 1981 at age 86, he had sixteen grandchildren and four great-grandchildren.
