= Prosser Career Academy =

Location
- 2148 N. Long Avenue; Chicago, Illinois 60639; United States
- 41.9191°N 87.7618°W

Information
- School type: Public secondary vocational
- Opened: 1959
- School district: Chicago Public Schools
- CEEB code: 141077
- Principal: Sandra Shimon
- Grades: 9–12
- Gender: Coed
- Enrollment: 1,235 (2019-20)
- Campus type: Urban
- Colors: Royal blue Gold
- Athletics conference: Chicago Public League
- Team name: Falcons
- Accreditation: North Central Association of Colleges and Schools
- Newspaper: Prosser Press
- Yearbook: The Falcon
- Website: prosseracademy.org

Charles A. Prosser Career Academy (formerly known as Charles A. Prosser Vocational High School) is a public 4–year vocational high school located in the Belmont Cragin neighborhood on the northwest side of Chicago, Illinois, United States. Prosser opened in 1959 and is operated by the Chicago Public Schools district.

== History ==
Prosser opened in September 1959 for males only, first enrolling females in the 1975-76 school year. Prior to the summer of 1998 the school's name was Prosser Vocational High School. The school is named for Charles Allen Prosser, an educator who pioneered vocational education.

== Curriculum ==
During their first year, Prosser students enroll in the Freshman Academy, which eases the transition into high school. Students sign up in 8th grade if they want to be in the International Baccalaureate program. From there they can decide if they want to go to the IBDP or IBCP.

== School activities ==
- Advanced Technology Group
- Academic Decathlon
- After School Matters
- ASPIRA
- Cheerleading
- Drama
- Ecology Club
- The Falcon (newspaper)
- Anime Club
- GSA
- Key Club
- National Honor Society
- Rube Goldberg
- Student Council
- Tutoring
- Yearbook
- JROTC
- Culinary Arts
- Cosmetology Club

== Athletics ==
- Baseball (M) (V, JV)
- Football (M) (V, JV)
- Soccer (F, M) (V, JV)
- Softball (F) (V)
- Track and field (M, F)
- Volleyball (M, F) (V, JV)
- Swimming (M, F) (V, JV)
- Basketball (M, F) (V, JV)
- Cross Country (M, F) (V, JV)

== Notable alumni ==
- John Wayne Gacy – serial killer with 33+ murders, rapes (technically not an alumnus, as he did not graduate)
- Wally "Freak" Kozielski – radio DJ; a part of Mancow's Morning Madhouse for many years; also worked for 94.7 The Zone, Q-101, Rock 103.5, The Blaze, and 105.5 The Kat; is currently on 10a-2p at WRXQ100.7 FM (Q-rock) in Chicago
- Eddie Winters - Police officer and politician; Former member of the Illinois House of Representatives
- Delia Ramirez - Member of the Illinois House of Representatives, for the 4th district.
