= Charles A. Prosser =

American educator

Charles Allen Prosser (1871–1952) was an American educator. He was the architect of the 1917 Smith-Hughes Act. His mission in life was to help improve the education of American children.

== Biography ==
Charles Allen Prosser was born the son of a steel worker on September 20, 1871, in New Albany, Indiana.

He attended DePauw University in 1897 and 1906, where he received his B.A. and M.A. degrees. He also attended the University of Louisville where he received a L.L.B. degree. His Ph.D. was from Columbia University. Prosser also received many honorary degrees from several other universities in the United States.

Charles Allen Prosser taught physics and history at the old New Albany High School. He later served as Superintendent of the local school district from 1900 until 1908. During this time he improved the old instruction system by streamlining many regular activities, he upgraded the required teacher qualifications, under his administration he built the then new high school located at E. 6th and Spring Streets, he assisted the city in obtaining the present library, and also instituted the city's first night school program. Prosser was president of the Indiana Teachers Association for several years while living in Indiana.

For several years Prosser also served as a Juvenile Judge in Floyd County adjudicating cases involving minors and juvenile delinquents. This helped Prosser form his opinions on the needs of youth.

While superintendent, Prosser met many boys who were most interested in working with their hands to make things and only wanted to learn a trade. Prosser began to think that schools should help train boys for trades with the help of a Ph.D. He would not return to the superintendency at New Albany.

Dr. Prosser later began to work with other organizations including employment as the superintendent of the Children's Aid Society in New York City where evening industrial instruction classes were offered to the public. He later became Deputy Commissioner of Industrial Education for Massachusetts from 1910 to 1912, and then Secretary of the National Society for the Promotion of Industrial Education again in New York City from 1912 to 1915.

While Prosser was Secretary of the National Society, he traveled widely forming and enthusing many individuals and groups. Prosser suggested programs and standards that helped to pass legislation that showed the entire Nation the possibilities of public vocational education. He also served as the first executive director of the Federal Board for Vocational Education from 1917 to 1919. Prosser also reported to congress numerous times with his mentor David Snedden. On February 23, 1917, President Wilson signed the Smith-Hughes Act into law, and federal funding for vocational education was established.

Prosser finally moved to Minneapolis, where from 1915 to 1945 he headed the pioneering Dunwoody Industrial Institute (now Dunwoody College of Technology), where many of today's vocational training concepts were created.

Prosser died in 1952.

== Prosser's impact on vocational education ==
Prosser was instrumental in the writing and passage of the Smith-Hughes Act that began federal spending for vocational education.

Prosser believed that schools should help students "to get a job, to hold it, and to advance to a better one." He was critical of schools of the era because they focused more on scholarly works and college preparations rather than a focus on helping the students in getting real-world jobs and keeping them. Prosser believed that knowledge could not be easily transferred from one field of learning to another, instead he believed in order to be effective that learning had to be specific and directed to immediate ends. Attendees at Prosser's colleges included Georg Kerschensteiner. Prosser believed that there should be public vocational schools as an alternative to high schools, which would offer courses for each occupation available.

It was Prosser's work in Minneapolis that set the standards for modern Vocational Education. Dr. Prosser was also an author of many textbooks on Vocational Education, many of which are still used in vocational schools today. He would often collaborate with distinguished writers for bulletins and magazine articles around the nation.

Prosser wanted to get a vocational education program in high schools because he believed everyone could benefit from vocational classes not just people going into vocational careers. He believed that vocational classes in high schools would make the students more independent. This was brought to his attention when he was working with some teenagers who had some behavioral problems. He found the boys loved to do things with their hands and that is what was continuously getting them in trouble. He then looked into getting vocational classes in high schools and realized that these classes would benefit all teenagers in their education development.

== Schools ==
Prosser Career Academy located in Chicago, IL is named after Charles Allen Prosser. It is a Chicago Public School (High School) previously known as Prosser Vocational High School. The school offers a college prep International Baccalaureate program to a select few students. Charles Allen Prosser School of Technology located in New Albany, Indiana, Prosser's hometown, is named in his honor.
