= Pam Stewart =

Pam Stewart is a former Florida Education Commissioner. She served from 2013 until 2018. Earlier in her career she was a teacher, principal, and administrator. She was succeeded by Richard Corcoran. She was appointed by Rick Scott and succeeded Tony Bennett.
