= Tony Bennett (superintendent) =

American politician (born 1960)

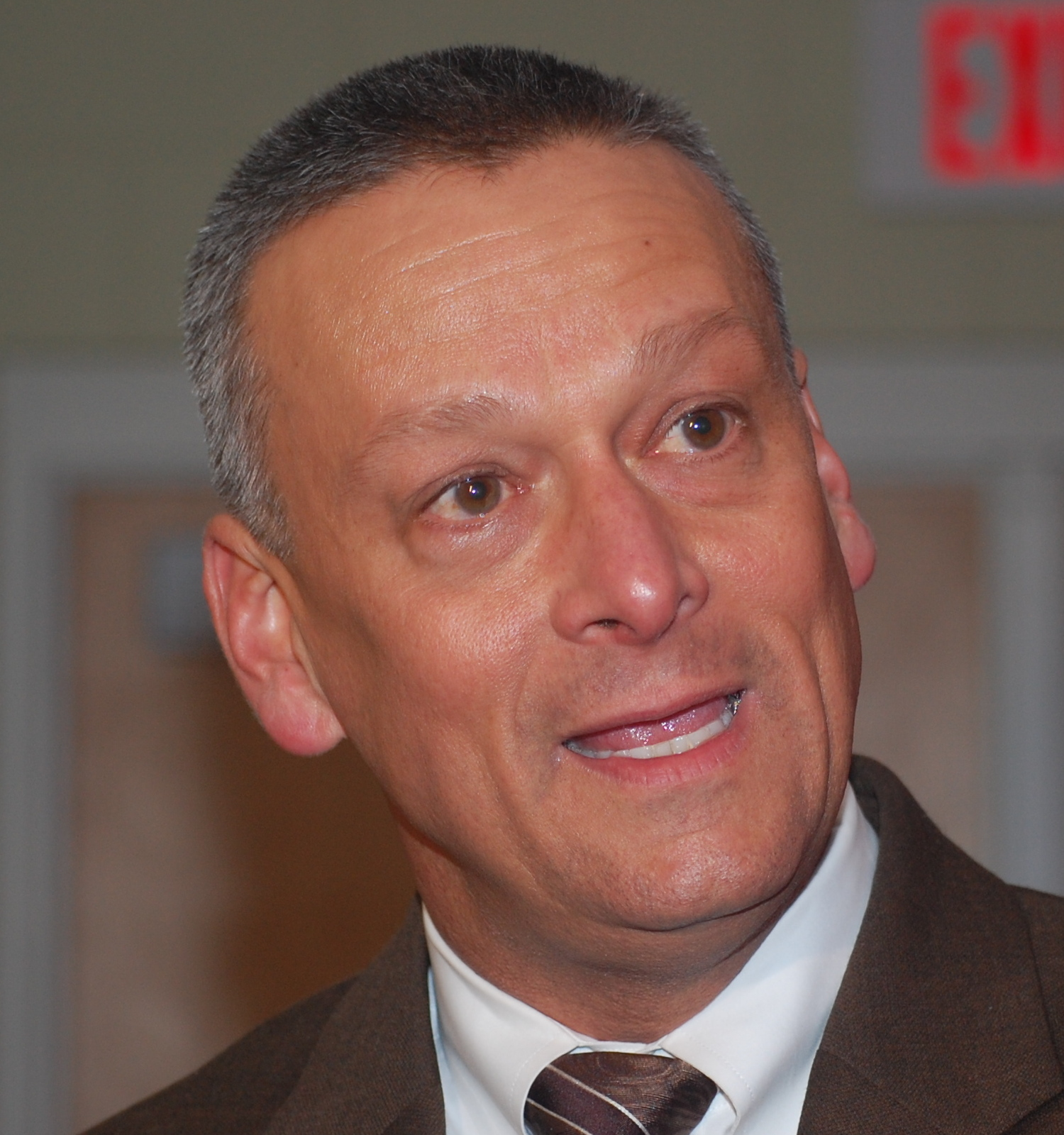
- Bennett in 2013

Education Commissioner of Florida
- In office December 12, 2012 – August 1, 2013
- Governor: Rick Scott
- Preceded by: Gerard Robinson
- Succeeded by: Pam Stewart

Indiana Superintendent of Public Instruction
- In office January 19, 2009 – January 23, 2013
- Governor: Mitch Daniels
- Preceded by: Suellen Reed
- Succeeded by: Glenda Ritz

Personal details
- Born: c. 1960 Jeffersonville, Indiana, U.S.
- Party: Republican
- Spouse(s): First wife (1981–mid-1990s); Tina (1996–present)
- Children: 4
- Education: Indiana University, Southeast (BS, MS); Spalding University (EdD)

Tony Bennett (born 1960) is an American educator and former government official. A member of the Republican Party, Bennett was elected Indiana Superintendent of Public Instruction in 2008. He lost reelection to Democrat Glenda Ritz in the 2012 election.

Bennett was later appointed Florida Commissioner of Education in 2012, a position he held until 2013.

== Early life ==
Tony Bennett was born in Jeffersonville, Indiana in 1960, and grew up in the neighboring town of Clarksville. As a child, Bennett attended St. Anthony of Padua Catholic School before attending and graduating from Our Lady of Providence Junior-Senior High School in his teenage years. Though Bennett later became a Republican, he grew up in a Democratic household, as his father was a blue-collar Democrat while his mother was a Kennedy Democrat from New England.

== Education and career ==
Bennett received his Doctor of Education and Indiana Superintendent's License from Spalding University in 2005; his Certification in Secondary Administration and Supervision from Indiana University Southeast in 1994; his Master of Science in Secondary Education from Indiana University Southeast in 1988; and his Bachelor of Science in Secondary Education from Indiana University Southeast in 1984. Bennett served as a teacher, coach and administrator.

- 2001–2007: New Albany, Indiana – Floyd County Consolidated Schools – assistant superintendent for administration and operations
- Greater Clark County Schools - superintendent
- 1999–2001: NAFCCS – principal of Charles Allen Prosser School of Technology
- 1997–1999: Scott County School District 2 – principal of Scottsburg High School
- 1993–1997: SCSD2 – assistant principal of SHS/ basketball coach
- 1992–1993: SCSD2 – assistant to the superintendent/ basketball coach
- 1991–1992: SCSD2 – biology teacher/basketball coach
- 1990–1991: Mohawk Local Schools (Sycamore, Ohio) – biology teacher/basketball coach
- 1983–1990: Providence High School – biology/science teacher (basketball coach 1987–1990)

In 2010, the Indiana Chamber of Commerce named him Government Leader of the Year and, in 2011, The Fordham Institute named him Education Reform Idol.

In 2016, Bennett was caucused by the Clark County, Indiana Republican Party to serve on the Clark County, Indiana County Council. The next day, he was unable to take office because he did not meet the residency requirement. However, the individual that was caucused on to the Council resigned months late, Bennett was re-appointed to the position. Following the election of his successor in 2018, Bennett was appointed to fill a different vacancy on the Council that occurred when Councilman Terry Conway was elected as Clark County Recorder.

== State superintendent ==
Bennett was narrowly elected Indiana State Superintendent in 2008, succeeding retiring four-term incumbent Suellen Reed. He was defeated for re-election in an upset. He made education reform a key platform of his tenure.

During Bennett's term, student achievement improved on several key academic indicators. Scores on the state's ISTEP+ exam, Advanced Placement pass percentages and graduate rates reached new highs.

Some criticized Bennett and his wife in 2011 because of her involvement with a charter school oversight program at Marian University. The state awarded a contract to Marian to establish a "Turnaround Leadership Academy" to train transformational school leaders. Officials noted the contract was awarded through a competitive request for proposals process.

Despite receiving nearly hundred thousand dollars in out-of-state campaign money, Bennett ended up losing the 2012 superintendent race to Glenda Ritz.

Then President of Purdue University, Mitch Daniels, claimed that teachers used illegal tactics to defeat Bennett.

=== Controversy ===
In November 2018, it was reported that Bennett, who directed policies in 2011 that eventually led to a state takeover of the Gary Community School Corporation in 2017, has an ownership stake in the company selected by the GOP-controlled legislature to manage the takeover with a potential to earn $11.4 million. After discovering the conflict of interest in Bennett's ownership in the management company, state and local lawmakers immediately called for a repudiation of the state's contract with his company.

=== Allegations of wire fraud ===
Bennett was investigated for misuse of public resources in his 2012 election, which he lost to Glenda Ritz. In July 2014, the State Ethics Commission accepted Bennett's offer to settle the ethics charges by paying a $5,000 fine. Publicly, the commission admonished Bennett for minor ethics violations, but internal documents obtained from the inspector general's office listed more than 100 potential violations of federal wire fraud law by Bennett or his employees. In May 2015, Marion County prosecutors had reviewed the inspector general's internal documents, and declined to pursue charges against Bennett.

=== Grade manipulation and resignation ===
In the fall of 2012, Bennett, as Indiana superintendent of schools, changed the "A–F" school rating system so that Christel House Academy, a charter school run by a major Republican donor which had donated $2.8 million to Republicans including $130,000 to Bennett himself, would receive a top A rating. Emails suggested a focus on just the one school. Bennett's email quoted him as saying, "We have NO chance of advancing accountability during the session with this problem in front of us." Subsequent emails showed his staff working to get the charter school up to an A rating. Bennett defended the rating change, saying the prior rating system disadvantaged Christel House because the school instructed students from kindergarten through 10th grade. Bennett said the same rating changes applied to other schools spanning nontraditional grade ranges.

On December 12, 2012, the Florida Board of Education unanimously selected Bennett as the state's new education commissioner.

On August 1, 2013, Bennett announced his resignation due to the scandal surrounding Christel House Academy, citing if he stayed on as commissioner it would "be a distraction to the children of Florida."

== Personal life ==
Bennett's first married in 1981, but he divorced his wife in the mid-1990s. In 1996, he married his partner Tina, who he had first met the previous year when Tina was the girls’ basketball coach at Salem High School. He has had four children, including a set of triplets, and three grandchildren.

On April 1, 2022, Bennett's daughter Elizabeth was shot and killed at her Sellersburg home. Police identified the suspect as Elizabeth's husband, Mac Lewis, and he was subsequently charged for her murder. Elizabeth's 11-year-old daughter and her friend were inside the house during the shooting. Lewis pled not guilty to the charges. In 2023, Lewis was found guilty and sentenced to 100 years in prison. After the verdict, Bennett stated "After 18 months of absolute hell, this is the first day of justice for our beautiful daughter, their mom, our two grandchildren and Emery who endured this tragedy."

Party political offices
Preceded by Suellen Reed	Republican nominee for Indiana Superintendent of Public Instruction; 2008, 2012	Succeeded by Jennifer McCormick
Political offices
Preceded by Suellen Reed	Indiana Superintendent of Public Instruction; 2009–2013	Succeeded by Glenda Ritz
