= Edmund Otis Hovey (Wabash College) =

American Presbyterian minister, Wabash College founder

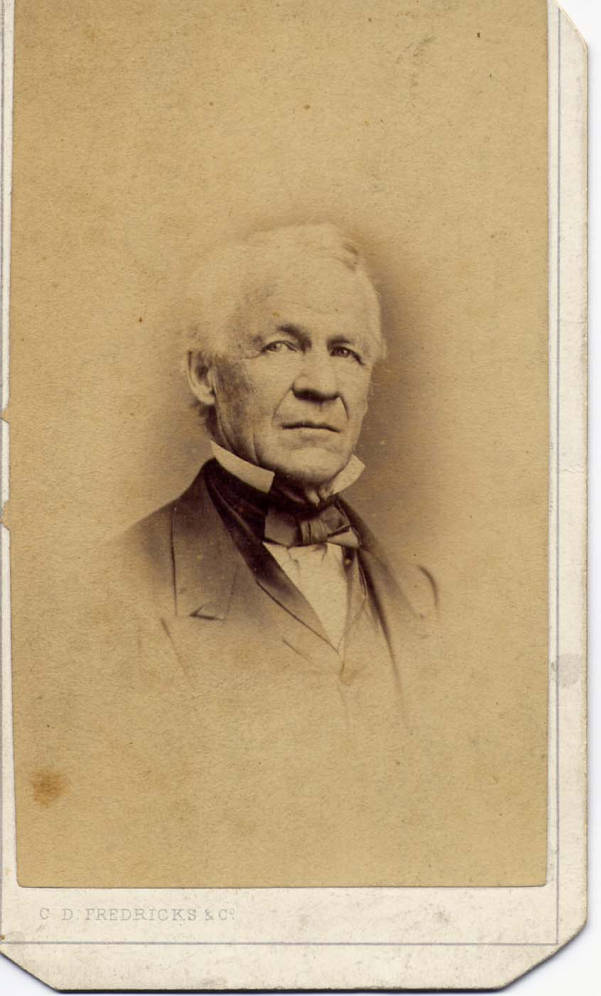
- Born: July 15, 1801; Hanover
- Died: March 10, 1877 (aged 75); Crawfordsville
- Resting place: Oak Hill Cemetery
- Alma mater: Thetford Academy; Dartmouth College; Andover Newton Theological School
- Occupation: Priest; missionary; teacher; librarian
- Employer: Wabash College
- Children: Horace Carter Hovey

Edmund Otis Hovey (15 July 1801 – 10 March 1877), D.D. was an American Presbyterian minister and Wabash College founder. He was born in East Hanover, N.H., on July 15, 1801. At twenty-one years of age, he began his preparation for preaching the gospel at Thetford Academy; in 1828, he graduated from Dartmouth College, and in 1831, he graduated from Andover Theological Seminary. He was ordained by the Presbytery of Newburyport the same year and sent as a missionary to Wabash, Indiana. His great work was in founding and building up Wabash College, Crawfordsville, Indiana, of which, in 1834, he was appointed financial agent and professor of rhetoric. Subsequently, he was made professor of chemistry, mineralogy, and geology. He was also treasurer and librarian. He died there March 10, 1877. See (N.Y.) Evangelist, on March 29, 1877.

This article incorporates public domain material from McClintock, John; Strong, James (1867–1887). Cyclopædia of Biblical, Theological and Ecclesiastical Literature. Harper and Brothers.
