= Curtis Hill =

American politician

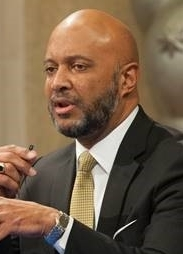
- Hill in 2018

43rd Attorney General of Indiana
- In office January 9, 2017 – January 11, 2021 (Note: Suspended: May 18, 2020 – June 17, 2020)
- Governor: Eric Holcomb
- Preceded by: Greg Zoeller
- Succeeded by: Todd Rokita

Prosecuting Attorney for Elkhart County
- In office January 1, 2003 – January 9, 2017
- Preceded by: Michael Cosentino
- Succeeded by: Vicki Becker

Personal details
- Born: Curtis Theophilus Hill Jr. February 21, 1961 (age 65) Elkhart, Indiana, U.S.
- Party: Republican
- Spouse: Teresa
- Children: 5
- Education: Indiana University, Bloomington (BS, JD)

Curtis Theophilus Hill Jr. (born February 21, 1961) is an American prosecutor from the Republican Party who served as the 43rd Attorney General of Indiana from 2017 to 2021.

A graduate of Indiana University and Indiana University School of Law, Hill was a lawyer in private practice and part-time prosecutor until 2002, when he was elected Elkhart County prosecutor. He was reelected to the post, ultimately serving four terms from 2003 before his election as state attorney general in 2016. During his tenure, Curtis led with a conservative agenda, opposing marijuana legalization and attempting to stop restrictions from being imposed during the COVID-19 pandemic.

In 2018, Hill was accused of sexual misconduct by four women, prompting calls for his resignation. Hill has denied the allegations. A subsequent investigation by a special prosecutor found the allegations credible, but also found that there was insufficient evidence to convict Hill of a crime. In 2020, in an attorney disciplinary proceeding, the Indiana Supreme Court found that he committed a misdemeanor battery in violation of rules of professional conduct, and suspended Hill's bar license for 30 days.

In July 2020, he was defeated by Todd Rokita for the Republican nomination of Indiana Attorney General. He ran for Governor of Indiana in 2024, but came in last place in the primary against U.S. Senator Mike Braun and Lieutenant Governor Suzanne Crouch.

== Early life and education ==
Hill was born and raised in Elkhart, Indiana, the youngest son of Curtis Hill Sr. (a postal worker and civil rights activist) and Eleanor (a cosmetologist). Hill studied business at Indiana University and received his J.D. degree from Indiana University Maurer School of Law.

== Legal career ==
Hill was a lawyer in private practice and a part-time prosecutor until 2002, when he was elected as county prosecutor for Elkhart County in Northern Indiana. Hill was re-elected to a further three terms. Like all Elkhart County prosecutors since 1938, Hill was elected as a Republican. Hill was recruited by National Republican Congressional Committee chairman Tom Cole to run for a seat in the U.S. House of Representatives in 2006, but he declined to run.

== Indiana Attorney General ==
=== Campaign ===
In 2016, Hill ran as a Republican for Indiana attorney general, seeking to succeed Greg Zoeller, who did not seek reelection. Hill ran against former Lake County Circuit Court Judge Lorenzo Arredondo, the Democratic nominee. Hill significantly outspent Arredondo in the race.

On November 8, 2016, Hill defeated Arredondo, receiving 1,643,689 votes (61.94%) to Arredondo's 994,085 votes (38.06%).

=== Tenure ===
Hill is the first African American man to become Indiana Attorney General.

As attorney general, Hill was viewed as a rising star within the Republican Party. He has frequently tweeted on national issues, and was speculated as a potential future candidate for U.S. Senate. As attorney general, Hill promoted conservative, and particularly socially conservative, policies. He opposed efforts to downplay opposition to same-sex marriage in the state Republican Party's platform. Hill also met with President Donald Trump at the White House on at least four occasions to discuss various issues.

==== Drug policy ====
Hill opposed the legalization of marijuana in Indiana and medical marijuana; in November 2017, Hill issued an official advisory opinion declaring the use of cannabidiol oil illegal in Indiana. Although a state law passed in April 2018 legalized the possession and use of a particular cannabidiol oil by persons registered with the Indiana Department of Health, Hill determined that the selling or distributing CBD oil was still illegal "under any circumstances, and even individuals entitled to use CBD oil under state law still are prohibited by federal law from doing so." The following year, the Indiana General Assembly overruled Hill's opinion, passing new legislation reaffirming and expanding CBD's legality in Indiana; the bill was passed 97–0 in the House and 36–11 in the Senate and was signed into law by Governor Eric Holcomb.

Hill strongly opposed needle exchange programs, and successfully pressured Madison County to halt its program. He favored harsher penalties for drug offenses, and supported the use of civil forfeiture. In 2017, Hill filed an appeal from a U.S. district court decision holding that Indiana's forfeiture law was a violation of the U.S. Constitution's Due Process Clause. In 2017, Hill joined with other conservative attorneys general in a filing in the U.S. Supreme Court defending "stop-and-frisk" programs from constitutional challenge.

==== Expenditures ====
In August 2017, Hill was criticized by some state legislators for spending $279,000 in state funds for renovations to his office at the Indiana State House, and for spending almost $31,000 in state funds for the purchase of a large passenger van to serve as a mobile office. Hill's office defended the expenditures.

==== Animal welfare and economic issues ====
As attorney general, Hill led a 17-state lawsuit against the Commonwealth of Massachusetts, seeking to strike down a Massachusetts state animal welfare law that would require eggs, pork, and veal sold in Massachusetts "to come from animals raised with room to lie down and turn around without touching an enclosure" beginning in 2022. Under Hill, Indiana was also one of 13 states that sued California over a law that bars eggs sold in California from coming from battery cage hens. The U.S. Supreme Court declined to accept original jurisdiction over both suits.

==== Policing, searches and seizures, and criminal law ====
In 2018, Hill filed an appeal with the U.S. Court of Appeals for the Seventh Circuit, seeking to challenge a settlement between the Marion County Sheriff's Office and American Civil Liberties Union of Indiana that stopped the county from detaining people in Indianapolis based only on federal immigration agency requests and without a warrant or probable cause. Hill asserted that the settlement would endanger public safety.

Hill opposed the adoption of hate-crime laws (Indiana is one of five U.S. states without such laws). In 2019, Indiana adopted a bias-motivated crimes law, but the law's failure to list gender identity, gender, or sex as specifically protected classes prompted criticism from anti-hate groups (such as the Anti-Defamation League, which termed the omissions "unacceptable"). Hill defended the new law in an op-ed.

In 2017, Hill criticized athletes who have protested police violence against black citizens, writing that the number of instances of police brutality "is but a fraction of the number of black people murdered by black people" and that "(black-on-black violence) deserves the attention of every American."

==== Objection to voting rights consent decree ====
In 2018, Hill objected to a consent decree to add additional early voting locations in Marion County. The decree, resulting from an agreement between Common Cause Indiana. the Indianapolis NAACP, and the county Election Board, resolved a voting rights lawsuit. The consent decree was approved over Hill's objections by U.S. District Judge Sarah Evans Barker, who wrote: "The state's lawyers may entertain what preferences they will, but violations of federal rights justify the imposition of federal remedies." Hill was criticized for his intervention in the case by Common Cause, the NAACP, and the Election Board, as well as Indiana Secretary of State Connie Lawson (a fellow Republican) who said that: "By his reckless action, the Attorney General has disrupted more than 18 months of productive bi-partisan conversations."

==== COVID-19 pandemic ====
During the COVID-19 pandemic in Indiana, when local governments imposed restrictions on the size of gatherings to prevent the spread of COVID-19, Hill sent a letter to Indianapolis Mayor Joe Hogsett and Marion County health department head Virginia Caine, asserting that the restrictions, when applied to religious gatherings, were unconstitutional religious discrimination. The local government disagreed with Hill's position.

==== Public records violation ====
As attorney general, Hill used personal email accounts to conduct public business, a practice that is discouraged by experts in open government and cybersecurity. In documents produced to the Indianapolis Star following a public-records request made by the newspaper in July 2018, Hill's office redacted personal email addresses. In March 2019, following a complaint by the Star, Indiana Public Access Counselor Luke H. Britt released an opinion stating that Hill's office violated the Indiana Access to Public Records Act by redacting "private email addresses embedded in otherwise disclosable public records." Hill's office refused to produce the names of the email addresses even after being notified by the Indiana Public Access Counselor that Hill's office was in violation of the public records laws, citing a different exemption as a reason to withhold the email addresses. The Indianapolis Star then successfully sued Hill and the AG's office; in 2021, a state judge ruled that Hill broke Indiana public records law and that private emails accounts that were used for public business constituted public records. The court ordered the AG's office to pay the newspaper $49,150 in attorneys' fees and imposed a $100 civil penalty on Hill, possibly the first time that an Indiana public employee was formally sanctioned by a court for failing to comply with public records law.

=== Sexual harassment investigations ===
==== Accusations and investigations ====
In 2018, multiple women accused Hill of inappropriate sexual behavior. Four women have accused Hill of groping them during a party at a bar in March 2018, on the last night of the Indiana General Assembly session, prompting an investigation by the Indiana Inspector General. At the request of General Assembly leadership, a law firm prepared a confidential memorandum dated June 2018 that summarized interviews with the woman; the memo was obtained by The Indianapolis Star and made public the following month. Of the four women, three have publicly come forward—State Representative Mara Candelaria Reardon and two legislative staffers.

The accusations against Hill prompted calls for his resignation from top elected officials in the state, including fellow Republicans, such as Governor Eric Holcomb, House Speaker Brian Bosma, and Senate leader David C. Long. Mike Braun, the Republican nominee for the U.S. Senate in 2018, also called on him to resign. Hill refused to resign, and denied allegations of misconduct. Republican attorney Jim Bopp set up a legal defense fund to cover costs of Hill's defense.

In July 2018, a Marion Superior Court judge appointed Daniel Sigler to serve as special prosecutor investigating the allegations against Hill. The Marion County Prosecutor asked the court to make the appointment to avoid a conflict of interest, because Hill, in his capacity as state attorney general, is representing the county prosecutor's office in civil litigation. Hill unsuccessfully sought to block the appointment of the special prosecutor. In October 2018, special prosecutor Sigler publicly announced the results of his investigation, concluding that the allegations of the accusers were "credible and true" but that there was not enough evidence to support a conviction for misdemeanor battery given the difficulties of proving Hill's state of mind. Simultaneously with the release of Sigler's findings, Inspector General Lori Torres released the results of her office's investigation into Hill's conduct the same day; the report was critical of Hill's conduct on the night in question, but determined that Hill did not violate state ethics laws when using state resources to defend himself. Torres said that "the public and others will judge whether the evidence in this case disqualifies Hill from holding elected office in the future."

==== Suspension of law license ====
In March 2019, the Indiana Supreme Court Disciplinary Commission, which oversees the ethical rules governing attorneys in the state, filed a complaint against Hill, alleging that he violated the Indiana Rules of Professional Conduct by engaging in acts of battery or sexual battery against the women. In a response, Hill said that the Supreme Court should not become involved in allegations against him. At a four-day hearing in October 2019, the four women who accused Hill of groping them at the March 2018 party testified against Hill; a fifth woman gave evidence that Hill had propositioned her when she worked under him at the prosecutor's office in Elkhart County. In December 2019, the Disciplinary Commission issued a filing calling Hill's actions "deliberate, loathsome and demeaning" and recommending that Hill's license to practice law be suspended for at least two years. In February 2020, the hearing officer in the case, former Indiana Supreme Court justice Myra Selby, concluded that Hill had committed battery and had violated the ethical rule requiring attorneys" to behave in a manner that upholds public esteem for the legal system," but found that the evidence was insufficient to prove that Hill had committed sexual battery or violated the ethical rule requiring lawyers to "promise to abstain from offensive personality." Selby recommended that the state Supreme Court suspend Hill from the practice of law for 60 days, without automatic reinstatement.

In March 2020, the state House passed (by an 84–9 vote) an amendment filed by Representative Timothy Wesco, Republican of Elkhart, that would provide that "if the individual who holds the office of attorney general is disbarred in Indiana or suspended from the practice of law in Indiana for 30 or more days or at any time during the five years before taking office, the individual forfeits the office and a vacancy in the office exists." The bill would have had the effect of disqualifying Hill from office if he were suspended from the bar for 30 days or more; Governor Holcomb said he would sign the bill if it reached his desk. However, the bill died at the end of the legislative session, as the state House and state Senate did not both pass the measure.

On May 11, 2020, Hill's law license was suspended for 30 days by the Indiana Supreme Court, which unanimously found that Hill had committed a misdemeanor battery in 2018, and therefore violated the rules of professional conduct for attorneys. The suspension began May 18, 2020 and ended June 17, 2020. Hill said, "I accept with humility and respect the Indiana Supreme Court's ruling." Governor Holcomb filed a motion asking the Indiana Supreme Court whether the suspension of Hill's license to practice law should result in his removal as attorney general; the governor suggested that if Hill were removed, he would be able to appoint a new attorney general. The Supreme Court declined to clarify Hill's status, since Holcomb was not a party to the underlying proceeding. (Indiana law requires that the attorney general be "duly licensed to practice law in Indiana" but does not specify the effect of a suspension of a law license on eligibility.) Hill designated his chief deputy to supervise the AG's Office during his suspension. A lawsuit challenging the designation, and asking for the post of attorney general to be declared vacant during Hill's suspension, was filed by four members of Common Cause Indiana.

=== Defeat for renomination ===
Despite the allegations against him, Hill continued to seek the Republican re-nomination for attorney general in the 2020 election. He was opposed by three challengers — Decatur County prosecutor Nate Harter, former U.S. Representative Todd Rokita, and Indianapolis attorney John Westercamp — all of whom called into question Hill's fitness for office. The nominee was selected through a Republican state convention, rather than a primary election. In mail-in voting at the Republican state convention, Rokita defeated Hill for renomination. Rokita received 52% of the vote on the third round (after Westercamp was eliminated on the first ballot and Harter was eliminated in the second). In the general election, Rokita defeated Democratic nominee Jonathan Weinzapfel, marking the sixth consecutive election in which Republicans retained control of the Indiana AG's office.

=== Indiana 2nd congressional district campaign ===
After the death of U.S. Representative Jackie Walorski, Hill attempted to replace her on the November 2022 ballot. He was defeated at the Indiana Republican Party's caucus for the nomination by Rudy Yakym.

== Personal life ==
Hill is married; he and his wife Teresa have five children. In his spare time, he moonlights as an Elvis impersonator.

Party political offices
Preceded by Greg Zoeller	Republican nominee for Indiana Attorney General; 2016	Succeeded by Todd Rokita
Legal offices
Preceded by Greg Zoeller	Attorney General of Indiana; 2017–2021	Succeeded by Todd Rokita
