= Jennifer McCormick =

American politician

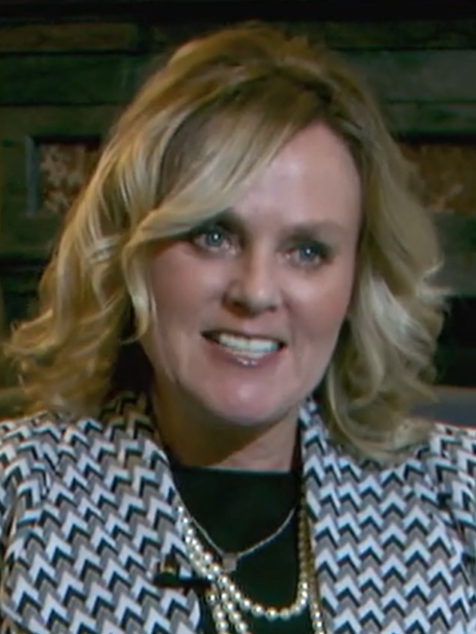
- McCormick in 2019

44th Indiana Superintendent of Public Instruction
- In office January 9, 2017 – January 11, 2021
- Governor: Eric Holcomb
- Preceded by: Glenda Ritz
- Succeeded by: Position abolished Katie Jenner (as Secretary of Education)

Personal details
- Party: Democratic (2021–present)
- Other political affiliations: Republican (before 2021)
- Spouse: Trent McCormick
- Children: 1
- Education: Purdue University (BA); Ball State University (MA); Indiana State University (EdS, PhD)
- Website: Campaign website

Jennifer McCormick is an American politician and educator who served as the 44th and last Indiana Superintendent of Public Instruction. Formerly a Republican, she unseated the Democratic incumbent Glenda Ritz in the 2016 election and served one term. Switching to the Democratic Party in 2021, she was their nominee for governor of Indiana in 2024 losing to Republican nominee Mike Braun.

== Biography ==
McCormick began her career as a special education teacher. She later worked as a middle school language arts teacher from 1996 to 2004. Then she became principal of Yorktown Elementary School in 2004. In 2007, she became the assistant superintendent of Yorktown Community schools and served in that position until she was selected as superintendent in 2010. She serves on the boards for Ivy Tech East Central Region, the Indiana Association of School Business Officials, and Delaware County Youth Salutes. In 2014, she was invited to the National Connected Superintendents Summit at the White House in Washington D.C. In June 2021, McCormick announced that she had officially switched from the Republican Party to the Democratic Party.

== State Superintendent ==
=== Election ===
McCormick was chosen by the Indiana Republican Party as the nominee for Superintendent of Public Instruction on June 11, 2016. At her convention speech, McCormick said Indiana must continue to reject national Common Core learning standards. She said "days of reckless testing must end" and that she knows what it takes to recruit the best teachers. McCormick and Ritz had one debate on October 17, 2016, in Fort Wayne, Indiana. McCormick defeated Ritz for the position of Superintendent on November 8, 2016.

=== Tenure ===
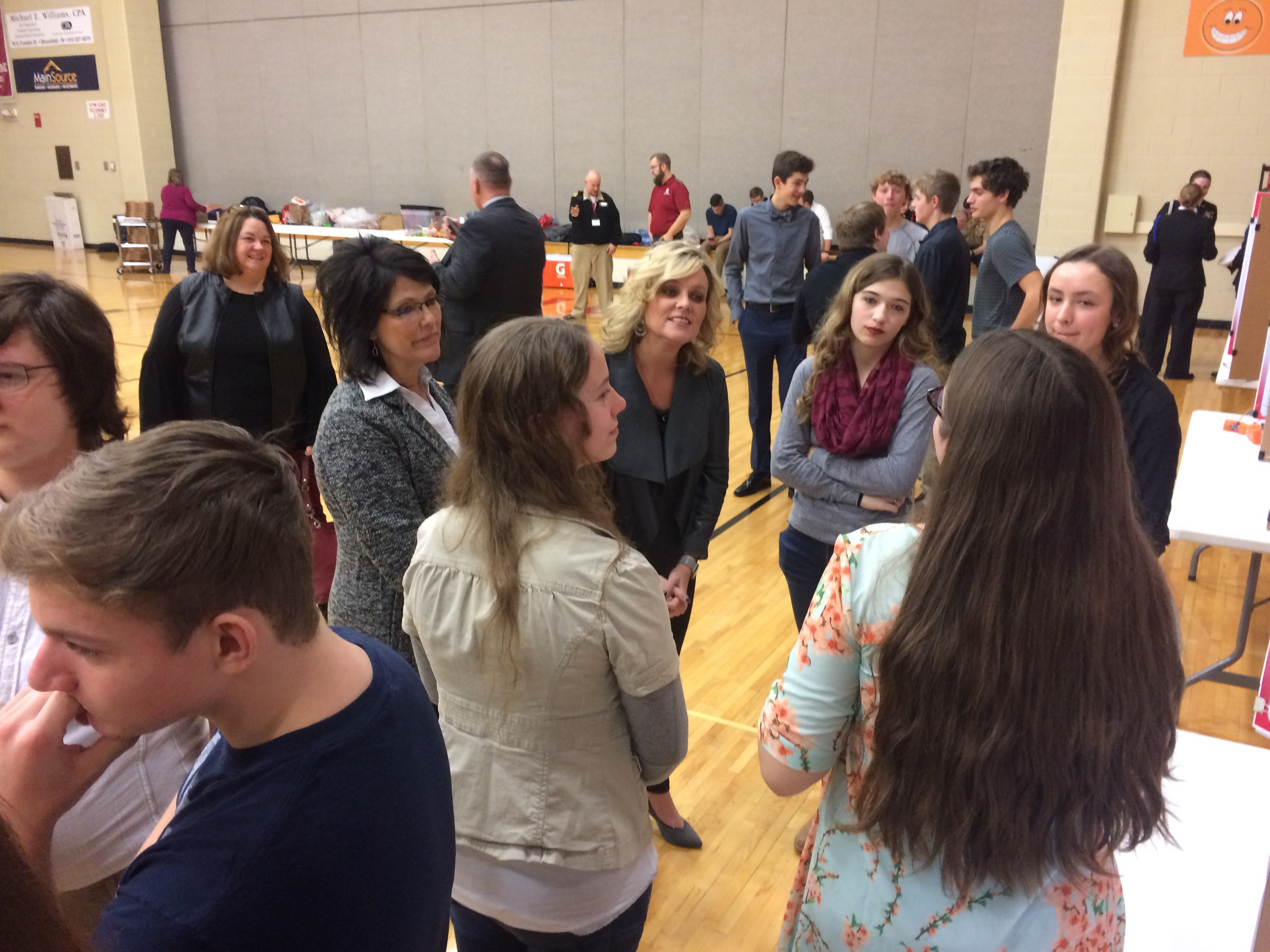
Jennifer McCormick at Bloomfield High School during the final Workplace Simulation Project Day

McCormick ran as a Republican candidate for Indiana superintendent of public instruction. She defeated Dawn Wooten and won the Republican nomination at the state party convention on June 11. McCormick defeated incumbent Glenda Ritz in the Indiana superintendent of schools election. The theme of her campaign was to remove politics from education and that the superintendent should again work in tandem with the Department of Education. It also stated including support for improving the current state assessment program and providing teachers with quality tools to enhance instruction. A primary responsibility for the superintendent will be to implement the Every Student Succeeds Act, a federal education law that replaces the No Child Left Behind Act signed into law by President George W. Bush in 2002.

== 2024 gubernatorial race ==
In May 2023, McCormick announced that she would enter the 2024 race for Indiana Governor as a Democrat. In the November general election she lost to Republican nominee and U.S. Senator Mike Braun.

== Personal life ==
McCormick is married to Trent, a public school science teacher and wrestling coach. They have one son; he attended the United States Military Academy.

== Electoral history ==
2016 Indiana Superintendent of Public Instruction election
Candidate	Party	Popular vote	%
Jennifer McCormick	Republican	1,423,042	53.0%
Glenda Ritz	Democratic	1,240,474	47.0%

2024 Indiana gubernatorial election
Candidate	Party	Popular vote	%
Mike Braun	Republican	1,566,081	54.4%
Jennifer McCormick	Democratic	1,183,741	41.1%
Donald Rainwater	Libertarian	129,781	4.5%
Christopher Ryan Stried	Write-in	52	0.0%

== Awards ==
- Outstanding Contributor to Education Award from the Muncie Delaware County Chamber of Commerce
- 2013: Person of the Year, Yorktown Chamber of Commerce

Party political offices
Preceded by Tony Bennett	Republican nominee for Indiana Superintendent of Public Instruction; 2016	Last
Preceded by Woody Myers	Democratic nominee for Governor of Indiana; 2024	Most recent
Political offices
Preceded by Glenda Ritz	Indiana Superintendent of Public Instruction; 2017–2021	Succeeded by Katie Jenner as Secretary of Education of Indiana
