= Suellen Reed =

American politician

Dr. Suellen Reed

41st Indiana Superintendent of Public Instruction
- In office January 11, 1993 – January 12, 2009
- Governor: Evan Bayh; Frank O'Bannon; Joe Kernan; Mitch Daniels
- Preceded by: Dr. H. Dean Evans
- Succeeded by: Dr. Tony Bennett

Personal details
- Born: June 22, 1945 (age 81) Rushville, Indiana, U.S.
- Party: Republican
- Education: Ball State University

Dr. Suellen K. Reed born June 22, 1945, is a former American educational politician. She served as the State Superintendent of Indiana from January 11, 1993, to January 12, 2009. She also served as Assistant Superintendent of Rushville Community Schools from 1987 to 1981.

== Links ==
- http://votesmart.org/candidate/biography/1861/suellen-reed#.UpVPW5EqBFw

Party political offices
Preceded by H. Dean Evans	Republican nominee for Indiana Superintendent of Public Instruction; 1992, 1996, 2000, 2004	Succeeded by Tony Bennett
