= Smith–Hughes Act =

U.S. act promoting vocational education

- Other short titles: Smith–Hughes National Vocational Education Act of 1917
- Long title: An Act To provide for the promotion of vocational education; to provide for cooperation with the States in the promotion of such education in agriculture and the trades and industries; to provide for cooperation with the States in the preparation of teachers of vocational subjects; and to appropriate money and regulate its expenditure
- Enacted by: the 64th United States Congress
- Effective: February 23, 1917

Citations
- Public law: Public Law 64-347
- Statutes at Large: 39 Stat. 929

Legislative history
- Introduced in the Senate as S. 703 by Hoke Smith (D‑GA) on December 7, 1915; Committee consideration by Senate Committee on Education and Labor; Passed the Senate on July 31, 1916 (Voice vote); Passed the House of Representatives on January 9, 1917 (Voice vote); Reported by the joint conference committee on January 19 – February 13, 1917; agreed to by the House of Representatives on February 16, 1917 (Voice vote) and by the Senate on February 17, 1917 (Voice vote); Signed into law by President Woodrow Wilson on February 23, 1917

Major amendments
- Vocational Education Act of 1963

The Smith–Hughes National Vocational Education Act of 1917 was an act of the United States Congress that promoted vocational education in "agriculture, trades and industry, and homemaking," and provided federal funds for this purpose. As such, it is the basis both for the promotion of vocational education, and for its isolation from the rest of the curriculum in most school settings. The act was based largely on a report and recommendation from Charles Allen Prosser's Report of the National Commission on Aid to Vocational Education. Woodlawn High School (Woodlawn, Virginia) became the first public secondary school in the United States to offer agricultural education classes under the Smith–Hughes Act. Of all the vocational subjects mentioned, home economics is the only vocational subject that the act recognized for girls.

== Securing passage in 1917 ==
Supporters of vocational education were very well organized under the leadership of Charles A. Prosser and Senator Hoke Smith. They ridiculed the traditional academic high school emphasis on courses in Greek, Latin and ancient philosophy. According to John Hillison, they designed the Smith-Hughes Act to support specialized programs that trained students for industrial and agricultural jobs. They saw education as a means to maximize productivity and meet the demands of a rapidly industrializing economy. They wrote a bill for Congress to pass--the Smith-Hughes National Vocational Education Act. It established a federal partnership with states to fund and support vocational education in agriculture, trades, and industries, and home economics. It aimed to equip students with practical skills for the changing job market. To secure passage it organized a temporary coalition that pushed it through under Senator Hoke Smith of Georgia. Prosser and the key leaders were based in the National Society for the Promotion of Industrial Education (NSPIE). They secured statements of support and lobbying help from many organizations. Those included the skilled workers of the unions represented by the American Federation of Labor (AFL); the teachers represented by the National Education Association (NEA); big business as represented by the National Association of Manufacturers (NAM); local business as represented by the U. S. Chamber of Commerce; the national Democratic Party; the Progressive Bull Moose Party and its leader former president Theodore Roosevelt; women teachers represented by American Home Economics Association; middle-class women of the General Federation of Women's Clubs; and the agricultural community represented by several major farm journals, the National Grange and the Association of American Agricultural Colleges and Experiment Stations. The opposition was not at all organized.

The most dramatic support came from President Woodrow Wilson. With World War I raging in Europe, the U.S. was still neutral. Wilson made military preparedness an urgent top priority, telling Congress in January 1916:

There are two sides to the question of preparation. There's not merely the military side; there is the industrial side. . . .We ought to have in this country a great system of industrial and vocational education under Federal guidance, and with Federal aid, in which a very large percentage of the youth of this country will be given training in the skillful use and application of the principles of science in maneuver and business.

== Separate state boards for vocational education ==
Several specific elements of the Act contributed to the isolation of vocational education from other parts of the comprehensive high school curriculum. To powers to cooperate ... with the Federal Board for Vocational Education." Each State board was required to establish a plan: "... showing the kinds of vocational education for which it is proposed that the appropriation shall be used; the kinds of schools and equipment; courses of study; methods of instruction; qualifications of teachers; ... plans for the training of teachers. ... Such plans shall be submitted by the State Board to the Federal Board of Vocational Education. The State Board shall make an annual report to the Federal Board for Vocational Education ... on the work done in the State and the receipts and expenditures of money under the provisions of this Act." (Section 8)

The term "state plan" has been a misnomer from the outset. The plan does not arise from state policy and leadership, but from the mandates contained in the Federal law. Rather than establish state priorities, describe organizational systems, or identify state goals, activities, or accountability mechanisms, the purpose of a state plan was to serve as a contract between the state and Federal governments, assuring adherence to Federal requirements and procedures.

The requirement to establish a Board of Vocational Education led some States to the establish a board separate from the State Board of Education. Thus some states had two separate governance education structures. This in turn fostered the notion of vocational schools as separate and distinct from general secondary schools, and of vocational education as separate from "academic" education. This was the case dido act.

== Separation of funds ==
Smith–Hughes spelled out the Federal Government's intent that vocational teachers should be "...persons who have had adequate vocational experience or contact in the line of work..". (Section 12) in which they were to hold classes. Federal funds, as well as State and local funds for vocational education, as specified in the State plans, could be spent on salaries of teachers with vocational experience, but not on salaries of academic teachers. Although the Act's intent was to avoid "raiding" of vocational funds by other segments of the comprehensive high school, the result was to separate the vocational education program from the mainstream of a school's operations.

== Segregation of vocational education students ==
The key restrictive section of the Act applied, however, not to teachers but to students. Smith–Hughes required that schools or classes giving instruction "to persons who have not entered upon employment shall require that at least half of the time of such instruction shall be given to practical work of a useful or productive basis, such instruction to extend over not less than nine months per year and not less than thirty hours per week". (Section 12) Thus, the law required the following: If a high-school student was taught one class by a teacher paid in full or in part from Federal vocational funds, that same student could receive no more than fifty per cent academic instruction. The Federal Vocational Board was quickly able to extend the control of students' time to what came to be known as the 50–25–25 rule: fifty percent of the time in shop work; twenty-five percent in closely related subjects, and twenty-five percent in academic course work. This rule became a universal feature of State plans from the 1920s to the early 1960s.

The 1917 Act was virtually silent on manpower projections and on centralized assignment of training quotas to school districts. If the driving force of the Act was labor shortages, one would expect it to contain processes to identify shortages and time-controlled means to meet them. Surely the 50–25–25 pro-ration of students' time fits the development of some kinds of skills better than others. The ultimate effect of the Act, though never stated explicitly, was to identify certain students and teachers as "vocational", and to protect the salaries of the latter by reserving for them (exclusively) certain amounts of Federal money matched by state and local contributions. Some critics infer that the authorities saw programs of practical instruction so endangered from a dominant academic elite that they required such protection by Federal law. The result, however, was to segregate academic teachers and students from vocational teachers and students and to strengthen the social alienation that early critics of these steps had feared.

== Smith–Hughes through the years ==
While the policy emphasis at the Federal level moved from the original focus on national defense to the severe unemployment problems in the 1930s, Federal influence in vocational programs remained largely unchanged. However a significant change did occur in the 1930s—the emphasis on vocational courses in what were then called "junior colleges" (which later evolved into community colleges).

In the next decade, the War Production Training Act, as implemented by the War Manpower Commission introduced the concept of "open-entry, open-exit" programs. A collateral Federal effort was the Rural War Production Training Act which emphasized agriculture related programs. By this time it had become abundantly clear that within vocational-technical education three restricted and restrictive program tracks were in force: a general education effort, a vocational education program, and various job training programs.

During the 1940s and 1950s, the program of vocational education which had developed in the early 1900s from the need to "train boys and girls for work", envisioned as national defense strategy in the 1920s, focused on unemployment in the 1930s, now encountered both the need to assist with the war effort during the 1940s, and the need to provide a transition to a peace-time economy. During this period and into the 1960s, States experienced first the burgeoning of industry related to the war effort, and later, growth in the junior college system and adult education.

Influences on vocational education during the 1950s were characterized by light industries springing from new technology, the emergence of the health occupations careers, and the inclusion of work experience as an appropriate part of public education. In addition, social policy at the Federal level led to two amendments to the George–Barden Act of 1946. The first amendment, Title II, Vocational Education in Practical Nursing, was a reflection of a Congressional interest in "the health of the people". Several years later, Title VIII sought to stimulate technical training programs in the wake of the launching of Sputnik.

During the 1960s, vocational education experienced especially heavy enrollment growth. All the while, technological advances were producing increasing employment dislocation. The gap between the affluent and the disadvantaged widened; poverty in areas of economic depression could not be ignored. Congress responded by enacting the Manpower Development and Training Act of 1961 (MDTA), followed by the Vocational Education Act of 1963 (VEA). It is surprising to note that almost 50 years after the Smith–Hughes Act, in spite of all the intervening changes, the definition and purpose of vocational education as set out in the new VEA remained largely the same.

In sum, the essential nature of Federal vocational education remained constant from 1917 until 1963, though authorizations for Federal allocations were raised under both the George–Barden Act of 1946 and the National Defense Education Act of 1958. Measured in terms of funding and enrollment, this early form of categorical assistance was successful. In 1917, just before implementation of Smith–Hughes, there were 200,000 vocational students in the United States and something less than $3 million was spent annually on their training. Forty years later, enrollment had increased to 3.4 million students and expenditures stood at $176 million. Smith–Hughes required dollar for dollar matching of Federal money by the States, local governments, or some combination thereof. As the decade of the 1950s closed—the last decade for the Smith–Hughes version of categorical intervention—Federal funds were over-matched by both State and local funds, taken separately.

During this period of phenomenal growth, the whole arena of vocational education policy was left pretty much to the vocational education practitioners. There are several reasons for this phenomenon. Historically, vocational-technical education has not been a high priority area for the typical education reformer. Much more attention has been given over the years by education reformers and policy makers to concerns over the quality of preparation for postsecondary education. Several factors contributed to this "benign neglect". Most educators in positions to exercise authority at Federal, State or local levels have little or no experience with vocational education. Additionally, the academic research community has shown scant interest to the issues facing vocational education. Finally, until recently, there have been few pressures from the community to materially change the way vocational education is offered. As a result, policy influences affecting vocational education have been left, almost by default, to vocational educators. Because the Federal purposes in vocational education appeared to coincide so closely with the wishes of the vocational education community, i.e., to protect and expand practical training in secondary schools in the United States against the assumed opposition of the academic elite, the Federal acts were, practically speaking, self-enforcing.

== See also ==
- Career and Technical Education
