= U.S. Federal Board for Vocational Education =

The U.S. Federal Board for Vocational Education, often referred to as the Federal Board of Vocational Education, was created in 1917 and lasted until 1946. It was created by the Smith-Hughes Act of 1917 to promote nationwide vocational education for students interested in agriculture, industry, and home-economics.

== Morrill Act of 1862 ==
Introduced by Vermont Senator Justin Morrill and signed by President Abraham Lincoln., the Morrill Act (12 Stat. L., 305) is considered to be the first federal attempt at vocational education. It dedicated land obtained by the Northwest Ordinance of 1787 to be used for colleges that taught mechanics and agriculture. Its enactment kick-started a plethora of federal vocational education efforts. University of Washington professor, William Stull Holt, noted in his 1992 book Federal Board for Vocational Education: Its History, Activities, and Organization that "there was not a session in Congress from 1910 on when one or more bills [weren't] touching on some phase of vocational education"

== Organization by the Smith-Hughs Act of 1917 ==
Also known as the National Vocational Education Act, the Smith-Hughes Act (39 Stat. L., 929) established the Federal Board for Vocational Education. It was introduced by Georgia Senator Hoke Smith and Representative Dudley Hughes and signed by President Woodrow Wilson February 23, 1917. It set aside salaries and preparations for instructors of agriculture and industry.

The act separated the board into three parts: agriculture, commerce, and labor. Along with a U.S. Commissioner of Education, each part had a secretary and civilian representative. With these components, the board would oversee and fund vocational education across the states.

== Disbandment with the George-Barden Act of 1946 ==
The George-Barden Act of 1946 was introduced by Georgia Senator Walter F. George and North Carolina Representative Graham A. Barden and signed by President Harry Truman. It improved the Smith-Hughs Act by incorporating the state to nation rural and farm population ratio

With the passage of this act, the Smith-Hughs Act—and consequently the Federal Board for Vocational Education—disbanded due to opposing politics and organizational difficulties from within. Despite this, its efforts and accomplishments are still recognized and in effect in modern American vocational education.
