= Steve Carter (Indiana politician) =

American politician

41st Attorney General of Indiana
- In office January 1, 2001 – January 12, 2009
- Governor: Frank O'Bannon; Joe Kernan; Mitch Daniels
- Preceded by: Karen Freeman-Wilson
- Succeeded by: Greg Zoeller

Personal details
- Born: Lafayette, Indiana
- Party: Republican
- Education: Harvard University (BA); Indiana University Bloomington (MBA); Indiana University (JD)

Steve Carter (born 1954) is an American politician and businessman who served as the forty-first Attorney General of Indiana from January 1, 2001, to January 12, 2009.

== Biography ==
=== Early life and education ===
Carter was born in Lafayette, Indiana. His father was a farmer and realtor. Carter grew up on his family's farm in Lowell, Indiana.

Carter obtained a bachelor's degree in Economics from Harvard University. He also received his MBA and JD from the Indiana University Bloomington.

=== Political career ===
Carter, a Republican, served as chief of staff for John Mutz, Lieutenant Governor of Indiana from 1981 to 1989. Carter advised Mutz (who also served as Commissioner of Agriculture) on agricultural matters. Carter also served as chief counsel for the city of Indianapolis.

Carter ran for Indiana Attorney General in 1996, but was narrowly defeated by Jeff Modisett. Carter ran for the same office again in 2000, running on a platform of reducing drunk driving and cybercrime and bolstering consumer protection. Carter defeated incumbent Karen Freeman-Wilson and served as Attorney General from 2001 to 2009, in the administrations of Governors Frank O'Bannon, Joe Kernan, and Mitch Daniels. Carter was elected as President of the National Association of Attorneys General in 2005. A focus of Carter's work as attorney general was developing a strong state "Do Not Call" Law restricting telemarketing. Carter was succeeded to the office of Attorney General by Greg Zoeller.

Carter sought the Republican nomination for state Attorney General in 2016, but lost to Curtis Hill at the June 2016 Republican state convention.

=== Personal life ===
Carter's wife, Marilyn Carter, was a television journalist in Indianapolis.

Carter is the founder and president of the DeMotte Grain Company, Inc. in DeMotte.

== Electoral history ==
| Date | Position | Status | Opponent | Result | Vote share | Top-opponent vote share |
|---|---|---|---|---|---|---|
| 1996 | Indiana Attorney General | Open-seat | Jeff Modisett (D) | Lost | 48.65% | 51.35% |
| 2000 | Indiana Attorney General | Incumbent | Karen Freeman-Wilson (D) | Elected | 51.28% | 46.56% |
| 2004 | Indiana Attorney General | Incumbent | Joe Hogsett (D) | Re-elected | 58.18% | 39.92% |

Party political offices
| Preceded by Timothy L. Bookwalter | Republican nominee for Indiana Attorney General; 1996, 2000, 2004 | Succeeded by Greg Zoeller |
Legal offices
| Preceded by Karen Freeman-Wilson | Attorney General of Indiana; 2001–2009 | Succeeded by Greg Zoeller |
