= William C. Larrabee =

- Born: 1802
- Died: 1859 (aged 56–57)
- Known for: Third president of DePauw University

William C. Larrabee (1802–1859) was the third president of DePauw University.

Larrabee attended Bowdoin College at the same time as United States President Franklin Pierce and graduated in 1828.

Before becoming president of DePauw, Larrabee taught at Connecticut's Wesleyan University and Oneida College Seminary in New York. He took over the chair of mathematics in 1841 and also taught the natural sciences. Larrabee served as the acting president of DePauw, then known as Indiana Asbury University from 1848 to 1849 after Matthew Simpson and before Lucien W. Barry. After 10 years on the faculty, Larrabee left Asbury to become Indiana's first superintendent of public instruction.
