= Glenda Ritz =

Former Indiana Superintendent of Public Instruction (2013–17)

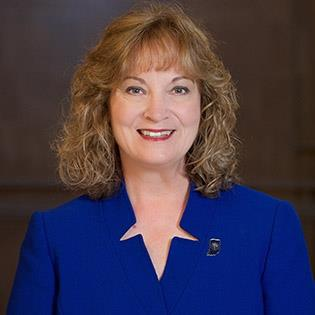
- Ritz in 2016

43rd Indiana Superintendent of Public Instruction
- In office January 19, 2013 – January 9, 2017
- Governor: Mike Pence
- Preceded by: Tony Bennett
- Succeeded by: Jennifer McCormick

Personal details
- Born: Glenda Sue Neubauer; 1954 (age 71–72) Lafayette, Indiana, U.S.
- Party: Democratic (since 2008)
- Other political affiliations: Republican (until 2008)
- Spouse: Gary Ritz (m. 1977)
- Children: 2
- Education: Ball State University (BA, MA); Indiana University–Purdue University Indianapolis (MA)

Glenda Neubauer Ritz (born 1954) is an American educator and politician who formerly served as the former Superintendent of Public Instruction for Indiana. She was elected in 2012, defeating incumbent Superintendent Tony Bennett. She was the first Democrat to serve in the office in 40 years and the first Democrat to win any down ballot race in the state since 1996. She, along with Senator Joe Donnelly, are the most recent Democrats to be elected to statewide office in Indiana.

On June 4, 2015, Ritz declared she would run for governor in 2016. On August 7, 2015, Ritz announced that she would no longer seek the nomination for governor, but rather seek re-election for Superintendent of Public Instruction. Ritz was defeated by Republican challenger Jennifer McCormick.

== Early life and education ==
Glenda Sue Neubauer was born in 1954 in Lafayette, Indiana, to Mr. and Mrs. James L. Neubauer. She graduated from Jefferson High School. She holds bachelor's and master's degrees in education from Ball State University, and received a second master's degree in library science from Indiana University–Purdue University Indianapolis. She has been married to Gary Ritz of Pendleton, Indiana, since 1977. The couple resides in Carmel, Indiana, and has two adult sons, named Brandon and Philip.

== Early career ==
Before her statewide political career, Ritz was an educator and library media specialist for 33 years, and her last position was at the Crooked Creek Elementary School in Metropolitan School District of Washington Township. She won teacher of the year awards at two different schools, and in 2012 she was one of 155 nationally board certified teachers in the state of Indiana. She served as a member of the National Board for Professional Teaching Standards, a board member of the Indiana State Teachers Association and president of the Washington Township local ISTA union, and president of the Washington Township Education Association for 15 years.

== Indiana Superintendent of Public Instruction ==
=== 2012 election ===
Originally a registered Republican, Glenda Ritz switched party registration in 2008 and ran as the Democratic nominee against first-term incumbent Tony Bennett to become the next Superintendent of Public Instruction in 2012. Ritz was seen as an underdog with Bennett enjoying a substantial fundraising advantage and support of many prominent Republican officials. She called the election a "referendum" on Bennett's tenure. A member of the ISTA, Ritz had solid support from teachers and used that network and social media to expand her base. She was endorsed by Democratic gubernatorial candidate John R. Gregg. Ritz won the election in an upset, capturing 52 percent of the vote. Newly elected Governor Mike Pence received fewer votes than Ritz in the general election.

Indiana 2012 Superintendent of Public Instruction Election

Candidate	Affiliation	Support	Outcome
Glenda Ritz	Democrat	1,332,755	52%
Tony Bennett	Republican	1,190,716	48%

=== 2016 election ===
Ritz was defeated in the 2016 general election by Republican nominee Jennifer McCormick.

=== Tenure ===
Ritz took office on January 19, 2013. As a member of the ISTA, she signed on to the 2011 court case against vouchers, but after her election in 2012, she removed her name so as not to have a conflict of interest in the case when she took office. The Indiana Supreme Court ruled unanimously in March 2013 that the vouchers were constitutional. In one of his first acts as governor, Mike Pence removed Ritz from control of the Educational Employment Relations Board, which is in charge of handling conflicts between unions and school boards. Later on, the CECI initiated a plan to remove Ritz from the state board of education by removing the superintendent as the chair. In 2014, Indiana became the first state to pull out of the Common Core standards with the support of the state legislature, Gov. Pence, and endorsed by Ritz and the legislature authorized Ritz to oversee the development of new standards. Pence and Ritz were able to agree on the new standards. New tests were created for those standards and also the federally mandated standards pushed by Pence, which resulted in 12-hours of standardized testing. Controversy developed over who was responsible for length of the testing time. The House agreed to reduce the test by a fourth and the Indiana Department of Education implemented the changes. In 2014, Ritz also opposed the Republicans push to create a fast track for teacher certification saying that the standards for licensing should be kept rigorous. This was passed by the state legislature and signed by Gov. Pence. On January 29, 2015, Indiana's House Education Committee voted in favor of allowing the State Board of Education to elect its own chair rather than be headed by the Superintendent of Public Instruction. At the time, Ritz refused to speculate whether she would remain chair.

== 2016 gubernatorial campaign ==
Ritz launched her gubernatorial race on June 4, 2015, following the announcements of John Gregg and Karen Tallian. At her announcement, Ritz said that education and the economy would be the centerpiece of her campaign platform. Political pundits predicted that Ritz was expected to get the support of the ISTA, which is the teachers' union. Glenda Ritz officially ended her gubernatorial campaign on August 7.

Party political offices
Preceded by Richard Wood	Democratic nominee for Indiana Superintendent of Public Instruction; 2012, 2016	Succeeded by None
Political offices
Preceded by Tony Bennett	Indiana Superintendent of Public Instruction; 2013–2017	Succeeded by Jennifer McCormick
