= Charles Allen Prosser School of Technology =

Public vocational school in Indiana, US

Location
- 4202 Charlestown Road; New Albany, Indiana 47150; United States
- 38.352°N 85.7944°W

Information
- Other name: Prosser Career Education Center
- Type: Public vocational career center
- School district: New Albany–Floyd County Consolidated School Corporation
- Principal: Nancy Campbell
- Teaching staff: 32.56 (on FTE basis)
- Website: prosser.nafcs.k12.in.us

Charles Allen Prosser School of Technology (commonly known as Prosser Career Education Center or simply Prosser) is a public career and technical education (CTE) center in New Albany, Indiana, United States. It is operated by the New Albany–Floyd County Consolidated School Corporation and provides shared-time vocational programs for high school students from multiple school districts in southern Indiana.

The school is named in honor of New Albany native Charles A. Prosser, an American educator who played a central role in the development of federal vocational education policy and is widely regarded as the "father of vocational education" in the United States.

== History ==
Charles Allen Prosser School of Technology opened in 1969 as a regional vocational school serving high school students from southern Indiana. It was historically known as the C. A. Prosser Vocational Center and, by the early 1990s, as the Prosser School of Technology.

In later years the school adopted the public-facing name Prosser Career Education Center while retaining its formal designation as Charles Allen Prosser School of Technology. Regional workforce and economic-development materials describe Prosser as a key provider of technical training and a major component of the local education-to-workforce pipeline.

In 2023, Prosser began construction of a heavy equipment training facility adjacent to the main campus. The open-sided, lighted structure is intended to allow year-round operation of heavy equipment and related programs and to expand evening class offerings for both high school and adult learners.

== Programs ==
Prosser offers a range of career and technical education programs that allow students to earn high school credit while gaining occupational skills and work-based learning experience. Program areas include, among others:

- Automotive collision repair and automotive services
- Aviation maintenance
- Construction trades, including carpentry, electrical, HVAC, and plumbing and pipefitting
- Cosmetology
- Criminal justice and law enforcement
- Culinary arts
- Cyber security and computer operations/networking
- Dental careers
- Diesel services
- Early childhood education
- Education professions
- Fire rescue and emergency medical technician (EMT)
- Health careers and pre-nursing pathways
- Industrial automation and robotics
- Landscaping
- Precision machining
- Software development (programming)
- Welding technology

Many programs prepare students for industry-recognized certifications in fields such as welding (AWS certifications), construction (NCCER credentials), information technology (CompTIA A+, Network+, Security+ and related certificates), healthcare (including certified nursing assistant and medical assistant credentials) and cosmetology (Indiana state cosmetology licensure).

== Service area and enrollment ==
Prosser is a shared regional center rather than a stand-alone comprehensive high school. A 1990s description by the U.S. Department of Education characterized the school as providing technical instruction to students from multiple school corporations in Clark, Floyd, Harrison, Scott and Washington counties in southern Indiana. Later alumni and workforce-development materials indicate that Prosser serves students from school districts across five counties and draws juniors and seniors from more than twenty public and private high schools in the region.

Alumni and promotional sources describe Prosser as one of the largest, and in some contexts the largest, career center in Indiana, with more than two dozen CTE programs and an annual enrollment that has been reported in the range of roughly 1,300 to 1,500 students.

The National Center for Education Statistics lists Prosser as a vocational school in the New Albany–Floyd County Consolidated School District, with a grade span of 6–12 and 32.56 full-time equivalent classroom teachers as of the 2023–2024 school year; enrollment is reported as zero because students are counted at their home high schools rather than at the shared CTE center.

== Postsecondary credit and partnerships ==
Many Prosser programs offer dual credit through partnerships with area colleges and universities. Program descriptions identify Ivy Tech Community College (particularly the Sellersburg and Noblesville campuses) and Vincennes University as major dual-credit and early-college partners, with students able to earn transcribed college credits while completing their high school CTE coursework.

Some pathways, such as aviation maintenance and selected health and technical programs, allow students to complete substantial portions of an associate degree curriculum while at Prosser and to continue at a partner institution after high school graduation to complete the degree or additional certifications.

== Adult and continuing education ==
In addition to serving high school students, Prosser offers selected evening and adult education opportunities. These have included apprenticeship-related training in areas such as plumbing and pipefitting, heavy equipment operation and other construction-related fields, often delivered in partnership with industry groups and workforce organizations.
