= Indiana Superintendent of Public Instruction =

Former elected office in the state government of Indiana

Superintendent of Public Instruction of Indiana
- Member of: Government of Indiana
- Formation: 1851
- First holder: William C. Larrabee
- Final holder: Jennifer McCormick
- Abolished: January 11, 2021
- Succession: Secretary of Education
- Salary: $94,538

The superintendent of public instruction was an elected officer in the state government of Indiana. The official was an elected member of the executive branch of government and worked with the state Board of Education as head of the Indiana Department of Education to oversee certain areas of public schools in Indiana. The position was created in 1851 with the adoption of the Constitution of Indiana, and filled in the first general election following its creation. The position of the Superintendent of Public Instruction was abolished in 2021, being replaced by the Secretary of Education, who is appointed by the governor.

The annual salary of the superintendent of public instruction of Indiana was $94,538 in 2008.

== List of superintendents ==
Democratic People's Republican

#	Name	Took office	Left office	Party	Hometown	Notes
1	William C. Larrabee	November 8, 1852	November 8, 1854	Democratic	Crawfordsville	
2	Caleb Mills	November 8, 1854	February 10, 1857	People's	Crawfordsville	
3	William C. Larrabee	February 10, 1857	February 10, 1859	Democratic	Crawfordsville	
4	Samuel L. Rugg	February 10, 1859	February 10, 1861	Democratic	Allen County	
5	Miles J. Fletcher	February 10, 1861	May 10, 1862	Republican	Putnam County	
6	Samuel K. Hoshour	April 15, 1862	November 25, 1862	Republican	Wayne County	
7	Samuel L. Rugg	November 25, 1862	March 15, 1867	Democratic	Allen County, Indiana	
8	George W. Hoss	March 15, 1865	October 17, 1868	Democratic	Indianapolis, Indiana	
9	Barnabas C. Hobbs	October 26, 1868	March 15, 1871	Republican	Bloomingdale, Indiana	
10	Milton B. Hopkins	March 15, 1871	August 17, 1874	Democratic	Kokomo, Indiana	
11	Alexander C. Hopkins	August 20, 1874	March 15, 1875	Democratic	Milroy, Indiana	
12	James H. Smart	March 15, 1875	March 15, 1881	Democratic	Fort Wayne, Indiana	
13	John M. Bloss	March 15, 1881	March 15, 1883	Republican	Evansville, Indiana	
14	John W. Holcombe	March 15, 1883	March 15, 1887	Democratic	Valparaiso, Indiana	
15	Harvey Marion LaFollette	March 15, 1887	March 15, 1891	Republican	Boone County, Indiana	
16	Hervey D. Vories	March 15, 1891	March 15, 1895	Democratic	Nineveh, Indiana	
17	David M Geeting	March 15, 1895	March 15, 1899	Republican	Clinton County, Indiana	
18	Frank L. Jones	March 15, 1899	March 15, 1903	Republican	Howard County, Indiana	
19	Fassett A. Cotton	March 15, 1903	March 15, 1909	Republican	Henry County, Indiana	
20	Robert J. Aley	March 15, 1909	January 1, 1910	Democratic	Owen County, Indiana	
21	Charles A. Greathouse	January 1, 1910	March 15, 1917	Democratic	Mount Vernon, Indiana	
22	Horace D. Ellis	March 15, 1917	March 15, 1919	Republican	Vincennes, Indiana	
23	Linnaeus N. Hines	March 15, 1919	October 1, 1921	Republican	Noblesville, Indiana	
24	Benjamin J. Burris	January 1, 1921	November 1, 1924	Republican	Washington, Indiana	
25	Henry N. Sherwood	March 15, 1924	March 15, 1927	Republican	Franklin, Indiana	
26	Charles F. Miller	March 15, 1927	September 1, 1927	Republican	Elkhart County, Indiana	
27	Roy P. Wisehart	September 1, 1927	March 15, 1931	Republican	Union City, Indiana	
28	George C. Cole	March 15, 1931	December 31, 1933	Democratic	Lawrenceburg, Indiana	
30	Floyd I. McMurray	January 1, 1934	March 15, 1941	Democratic	Thorntown, Indiana	
31	Clement T. Malan	March 15, 1941	March 15, 1947	Republican	Terre Haute, Indiana	
32	Ben H. Watt	March 15, 1947	March 15, 1949	Republican	Noblesville, Indiana	
33	Deane E. Walker	March 15, 1949	March 15, 1951	Democratic	Culver, Indiana	
34	Wilbur E. Young	March 15, 1951	March 15, 1959	Republican	Osgood, Indiana	
35	William E. Wilson	March 15, 1959	March 15, 1967	Democratic	Jeffersonville, Indiana	
36	Richard D. Wells	March 15, 1967	March 15, 1971	Republican	Valparaiso, Indiana	
37	John J. Loughlin	March 15, 1971	March 15, 1973	Democratic	South Bend, Indiana	
39	Harold H. Negley	March 15, 1973	June 6, 1985	Republican	Indianapolis, Indiana	
40	H. Dean Evans	June 6, 1985	January 11, 1993	Republican	Indianapolis, Indiana	
41	Suellen Reed	January 11, 1993	January 12, 2009	Republican	Rushville, Indiana	
42	Tony Bennett	January 12, 2009	January 19, 2013	Republican	New Albany, Indiana	
43	Glenda Ritz	January 19, 2013	January 9, 2017	Democratic	Carmel, Indiana	
44	Jennifer McCormick	January 9, 2017	January 11, 2021	Republican	Yorktown, Indiana	

== See also ==
- Government of Indiana

== Sources ==
- Funk, Arville L (1983) [1969]. A Sketchbook of Indiana History. Rochester, Indiana: Christian Book Press. pp. 212–213.

https://ballotpedia.org/Indiana_Superintendent_of_Public_Instruction
