= Greg Zoeller =

American lawyer

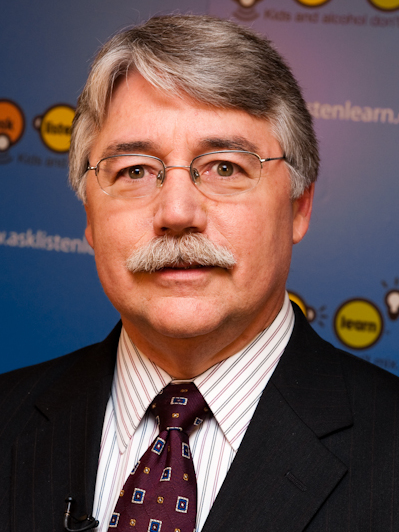

42nd Attorney General of Indiana
- In office January 12, 2009 – January 9, 2017
- Governor: Mitch Daniels; Mike Pence
- Preceded by: Steve Carter
- Succeeded by: Curtis Hill

Personal details
- Born: Gregory Francis Zoeller; March 28, 1955 (age 70); New Albany, Indiana, U.S.
- Political party: Republican
- Education: Purdue University, West Lafayette (BS); Indiana University, Bloomington (JD)

Gregory Francis Zoeller (born March 28, 1955) is an American lawyer who served as the 42nd attorney general of the U.S. state of Indiana from 2009 to 2017. A Republican, he was elected in November 2008, defeating Democrat Linda Pence, and took office on January 12, 2009, and was re-elected to a second four-year term in 2012. He retired to run unsuccessfully for Congress.

== Early life and education ==
Zoeller is a native of New Albany, Indiana. He graduated from Providence High School. He earned an undergraduate degree in computer science from Purdue University and a J.D. degree from Indiana University.

== Legal and political career ==
For decades, Zoeller was known as an "unwavering conservative Hoosier Republican." He was a staffer for Dan Quayle, joining Quayle's U.S. Senate staff in 1983 and remained an aide to Quayle during his vice presidency, with the title of Assistant to the Vice President and Director of Public Liaison. He left Quayle's staff in 1991 to join a private law practice in Indianapolis. He joined the Indiana Attorney General's office in 2001. He was chief deputy in the office before being elected to two terms as state AG, serving from 2009 to January 2017.

As AG, Zoeller was co-chair of Prescription Drug Abuse and Prevention Task Force. He supported needle exchange programs and the deployment of naloxone (Narcan) in order to minimize harms (such as HIV and hepatitis C) caused by intravenous drug use.

=== Notable cases during term as state Attorney General ===
During his term as AG, Zoeller brought multiple legal challenges to the Affordable Care Act, including Indiana v. IRS. Zoeller also joined lawsuits challenging Obama administration EPA environmental protection regulation, including a water pollution rule and the Clean Power Plan.

In 2013, Zoeller signed onto an amicus brief in the Supreme Court case of Town of Greece v. Galloway, arguing that the Court should allow prayer "before legislative bodies without requiring legislative leaders to screen prayers for sectarian references."

In 2014, after the U.S. Court of Appeals for the Seventh Circuit ruled that Indiana's same-sex marriage ban was unconstitutional, Zoeller filed an appeal with the U.S. Supreme Court, saying that the Court needed to give "a final, unambiguous and conclusive answer ... on the legal authority of states to license marriages." While some criticized Zoeller for appealing, Zoeller argued that he was duty-bound to defend the constitutionality of state laws in court as part of the adversarial system.

In 2014, as the Supreme Court was considering the cases of Hollingsworth v. Perry and United States v. Windsor, Zoeller's office filed amicus briefs in support of the position that states had the right not to recognize same-sex marriage. After the Supreme Court issued its decisions in favor of the LGBT plaintiffs, Zoeller issued a statement saying: "While my office is duty bound to defend the authority of our state legislature and their decisions, I recognize that people have strongly held and vastly different views on the issue of marriage and ask that everyone show respect with civility to our Supreme Court and our constitutional system. Regardless of the different views people may hold, marriage should be a source of unity and not division."

=== Unsuccessful bid for Congress ===
In 2016, Zoeller sought the Republican nomination primary election for Indiana's 9th congressional district, a seat in the U.S. House of Representatives, but was defeated by millionaire businessman Trey Hollingsworth. After losing his bid for nomination to Congress, Zoeller chose not to seek a third term as AG. Shortly after leaving office, he donated $10,000 in remaining campaign funds to the Indiana Bar Foundation, saying that the contribution "concludes my public service." He made plans to teach part-time at a law school, work as a mediator, and pursue business endeavors, adding, "I don't know if I fit today's political arena."

== After elected office ==
Zoeller left office after two terms as state attorney general, and became a consultant and counsel. In 2017, he became general counsel for the Noblesville, Indiana-based Golars Environmental Engineering, an environmental remediation firm. He serves as chairman of the World Trade Center Indianapolis project. In 2020, he described himself as a "former Republican" in presidential elections (saying "it's abundantly clear that the GOP is not likely to return to the party I joined anytime soon") and he voted for Democrat Joe Biden in 2020. He supported Governor Eric Holcomb's willingness to accept refugee resettlement in Indiana. He remains a Republican in state and local politics.

== Personal life ==
Zoeller is married and has three children. He is a Catholic. Professional golfer Fuzzy Zoeller is a cousin to Zoeller.

== Electoral history ==
Indiana Attorney General Election, 2008
Party	Candidate	Votes	%
Republican	Greg Zoeller	1,318,147	50.75
Democratic	Linda Pence	1,279,284	49.25

Indiana Attorney General Election, 2012
Party	Candidate	Votes	%
Republican	Greg Zoeller (inc.)	1,453,334	58.02
Democratic	Kay Fleming	1,051,504	41.98

Indiana's 9th Congressional District Republican Primary Election, 2016
Party	Candidate	Votes	%
Republican	Trey Hollingsworth	40,767	33.55
Republican	Erin Houchin	30,396	25.01
Republican	Greg Zoeller	26,554	21.85
Republican	Brent Waltz	15,759	12.97
Republican	Robert Hall	8,036	6.61

Party political offices
Preceded by Steve Carter	Republican nominee for Indiana Attorney General; 2008, 2012	Succeeded by Curtis Hill
Legal offices
Preceded by Steve Carter	Attorney General of Indiana; 2009–2017	Succeeded by Curtis Hill
