= 2010 Indiana State Treasurer election =

- November 2, 2010
- Turnout: 38.96%
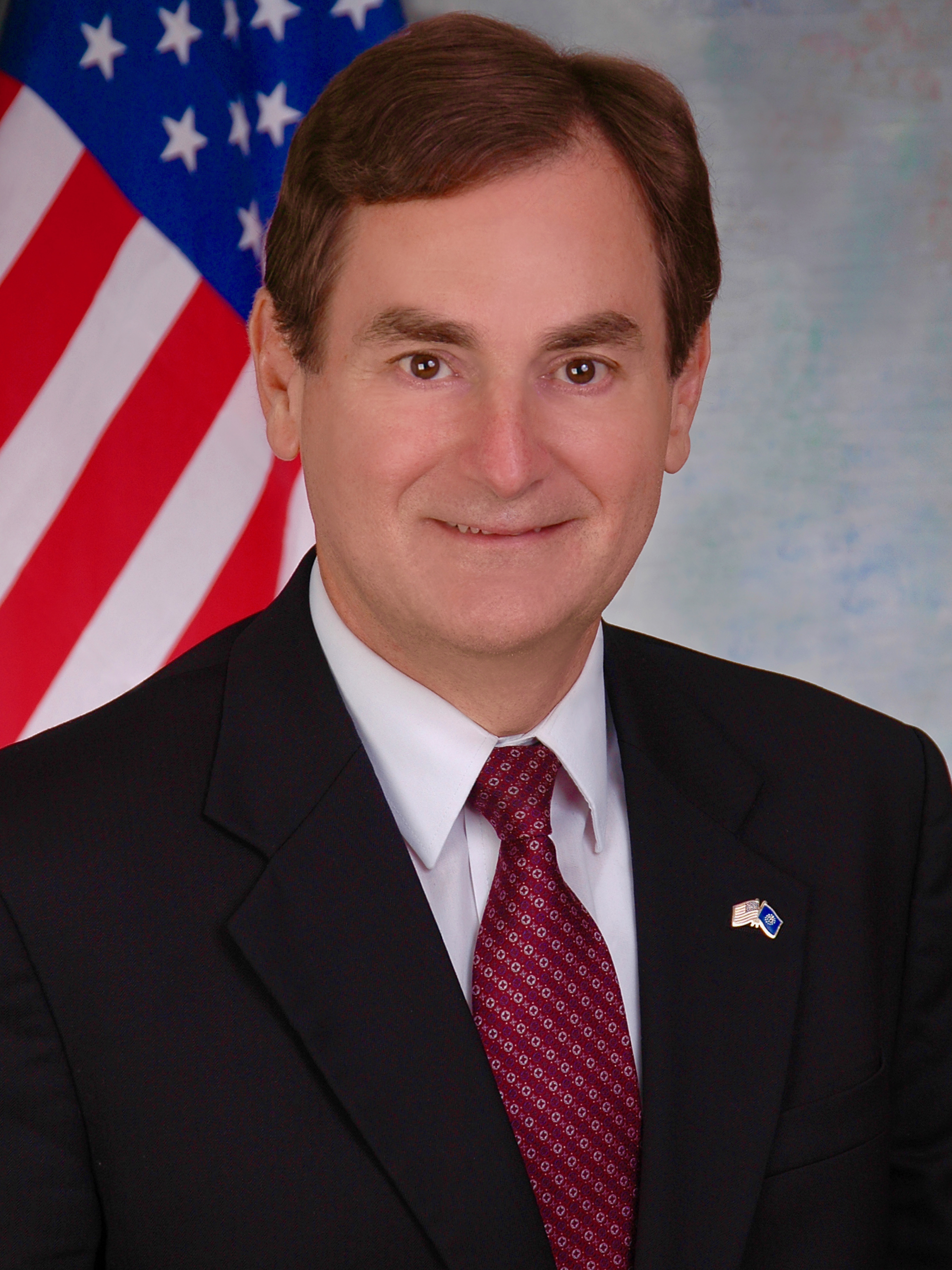

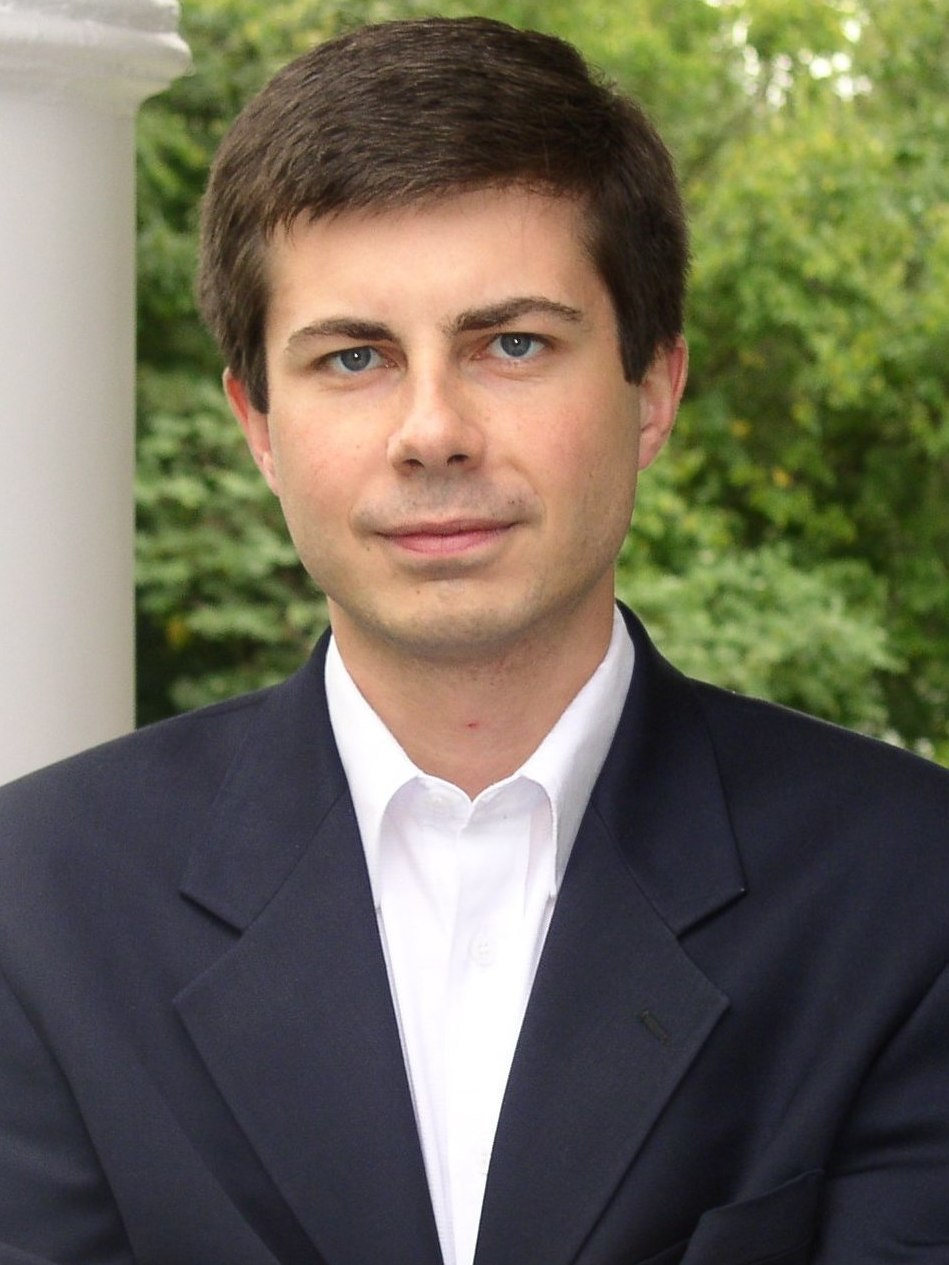
Nominee	Richard Mourdock	Pete Buttigieg
Party	Republican	Democratic
Popular vote	1,053,527	633,243
Percentage	62.46%	37.54%
- County results Mourdock: 50–60% 60–70% 70–80% 80–90% Buttigieg: 50–60%
Treasurer before election
Richard Mourdock
Republican
Elected Treasurer
Richard Mourdock
Republican

The 2010 Indiana State Treasurer election was held in on Tuesday, November 2, 2010, as part of the 2010 Indiana elections, held during the 2010 midterms.

Incumbent Republican Treasurer Richard Mourdock won reelection. His Democratic opponent was Navy veteran Pete Buttigieg.

Debate in the campaign largely centered around Mourdock's decision to invest $43 million of state pension funds and other state funds in Chrysler junk bonds (losing Indiana a large amount of money due to the restructuring of Chrysler during the company's bankruptcy, and his subsequent decision to launch unsuccessful litigation in an effort to stop Chrysler's bankruptcy plan (including the Chrysler-Fiat merger) from taking effect.

The 2010 elections was anticipated to be (and ultimately was) a Republican wave election, and Indiana was a Republican-leaning state. Therefore, as the Republican nominee, Mourdock's prospects were favored by prognosticators. With the 2010 election conditions in Indiana favoring Republicans, Buttigieg had hoped to persuade voters that were planning to vote Republican in other races to split their ticket for him. Ultimately, Mourdock defeated Buttigieg by a wide margin.

Mourdock would go on to run unsuccessfully for the United States Senate in 2012 before resigning as treasurer. Buttigieg would go on to be elected mayor of South Bend in 2011, ultimately serving two terms. In 2020, Buttigieg would run an unsuccessful but competitive campaign for the Democratic nomination for U.S. president. During this campaign, he attained broad prominence; subsequently, he was appointed U.S. secretary of transportation in 2021 by newly elected president Joe Biden.

== Background ==
Incumbent Republican Richard Mourdock had won election four years earlier 52% to 48%, which was considered to be a relatively narrow victory. The 2006 election cycle had been nationally considered a favorable cycle for the Democratic Party, nationally being considered a Democratic wave election. Contrarily, 2010 was considered to be a favorable cycle for the Republican Party. 2010 ultimately proved to be an immense Republican wave election.

Indiana was considered to be a Republican-leaning state. Republicans had held the Indiana State Treasurer's office since 1979.

During his term, Mourdock had invested $43 million of state pension funds and other state funds in Chrysler junk bonds. This move by Mourdock lost Indiana a large amount of money due to the restructuring of Chrysler during the company's bankruptcy. Mourdock unsuccessfully would take legal action to attempt to stop Chrysler's bankruptcy plan (including the Chrysler-Fiat merger) from taking effect. These actions would become a central issue of the 2010 election campaigning.

== Nominations ==
Democrats nominated Pete Buttigieg. He was the only candidate to seek the Democratic nomination, and was formally nominated at the Democratic state convention in Indianapolis on June 26.

Republicans formally renominated incumbent State Treasurer Richard Mourdock at their state convention on June 19.

== Campaigning ==
=== Buttigieg's campaign ===
Buttigieg launched an exploratory campaign in March 2010. That month, he resigned from his job at the consulting firm McKinsey & Company in order to campaign full-time. Buttigieg formally launched his candidacy during South Bend's Dyngus Day celebrations on April 5.

Buttigieg was ultimately unchallenged for the Democratic nomination and was formally nominated at the Democratic state convention in Indianapolis on June 26.

Buttigieg was considered a long-shot. Buttigieg was a political newcomer, a first-time candidate, and had never held public office, even proclaiming on his campaign website, "I'm a businessman who has never run for office before, but I have the education, experience and energy to lend a hand at this critical time in our state's history." Buttigieg also lacked name recognition.

Buttigieg raised $287,000 in campaign contributions. He refused to accept campaign contributions from banks or bank PACs. He also placed limits on the amount of contributions accepted by his campaign from individuals who work at banks, refusing to accept contributions from bank employees in excess of $2,300. Buttigieg expressed a belief that the acceptance of campaign funds from banks, bank executives, and political action committees connected to banks would be a conflict of interest for a state treasurer candidate.

If elected, Buttigieg would have been the first elected state treasurer to hail from South Bend.

Buttigieg criticized Mourdock for having invested state pension funds and other state funds in Chrysler junk bonds. He also criticized the legal action which Mourdock took in an attempt to stop Chrysler's bankruptcy plan from taking effect, arguing that this could have imperiled a company which Buttigieg described as being, "one of the most important employers in the state of Indiana," and the jobs which it provided the state. Placing emphasis on the potential job loss that could have occurred due to Mourdock's lawsuit, Buttigieg even had his nomination seconded at the state convention by Richie Boruff, the president of Kokomo's United Automobile Workers Local 685. Buttigieg also argued that, had the lawsuit been successful, it would also have led to further losses in the value of the junk bonds. Buttigieg further criticized Mourdock for choosing costly out-of-state firms to manage the lawsuit, which charged the state $2 million for their services, arguing that he could have saved money and better benefited the state by using less expensive in-state law firms. Ultimately, the issue of the Chrysler junk bonds and the lawsuit against Chrysler emerged as the central issue of the campaign between Buttigieg and Mourdock. Potential evidence of the failure of Buttigieg to gain traction on his argument about the risk of job loss that could have occurred due to Mourdock's Chrysler lawsuit was that Howard County, home to Kokomo (and 6,000 Chrysler jobs) was ultimately carried by Mourdock by a margin of 15,631 to 9,677.

Buttigieg touted himself as having a fiscally conservative record.

Buttigieg additional stated that he believed that the State of Indiana needed to be more selective about what banks it did business with, using the "power of the purse" to pressure and reward banks. Buttigieg wanted the state to start doing more business with local banks. Buttigieg proposed taking an "Indiana first" policy when selecting banks in which to deposit state funds. Buttigieg pledged that he would use the State Treasurer's office to pressure banks to be more "consumer friendly". Buttigieg argued that the state should only invest tax dollars in financial institutions that had demonstrated that they treat customers well, such as those that gave to small businesses and kept residents from losing homes to foreclosure. Buttigieg wanted banks to create more "job friendly" loan programs. Buttigieg also said that he would pressure banks to act more responsibly. He proposed setting guidelines for what banks Indiana would do business with which would include requiring that banks Indiana deposited money with had an Indiana headquarters, or have a large proportion of their employees (at least 50%) being in-state employees. His proposed guidelines would also require that banks comply with obligations with the Community Reinvestment Act, comply with the future requirements of the Consumer Financial Protection Bureau, and have a track record of community-oriented financial innovation (such as lending to micro enterprises). He would also require banks have, "a record of resolving distressed home mortgages through re-negotiation" and a "commitment to small business lending, including lending to minority-owned and women-owned enterprises". Buttigieg also spoke of a desire to invest in Indiana corporate bonds.

Buttigieg had a proposal that he had dubbed as the "Hoosier Capital Connector" under which he would return money deposited out-of-state to the state, depositing it at in-state financial institutions. Under the plan, money (including $100,000 million from the state's $3 billion general fund) would be deposited in local banks that agreed to lend cash at lower interest rates to local small businesses which pledge to generate or preserve jobs. The treasurer's office would connect such businesses with lower interest loans, and the program would require that the businesses and the participating financial regularly file reports with the treasurer's office. Buttigieg pointed to other states, such as Missouri, where similar policies had been implemented.

Buttigieg criticized the lack of transparency in the state treasurer's office. Buttigieg proposed measures to increase the transparency of the state's financial transactions. This would include increasing the frequency of reporting on the state's investments and its holdings, which were at the time annually reported, to at least quarterly. Buttigieg's plans also entailed being more transparent and standardized in the decision process of where the treasurer deposited state money, including publishing online the criteria expected of financial institutions where money would be deposited. It would also entail posting online of investment policy statements for each fund managed by the state treasurer's office, as well as information and links to outside firms managing state funds. Buttigieg's plans would also entail increasing the transparency of investment policy statements and state treasury records, making them accessible online. It would also involve employing an online tracking system for all public information requests. It would also involve an increase of public input in investment decisions, holding at least twice-annually a series of town halls. His plans would also place a prohibition on former employees of the treasurer's staff lobbying or doing business with the office for two years after they leave.

Buttigieg argued that, by keeping better track of deposits and lending, the state could free credit up and stimulate job growth. Buttigieg pledged that, as treasurer, he would seek to reinvest state funds in assets that were issued by companies based in Indiana wherever they would generate good returns on investment. Buttigieg also argued that the role of treasurer should be depoliticized.

Buttigieg called for the position of treasurer to have more stringent ethics codes. Buttigieg promised, if elected, to partner with the Indiana State Legislature to pass ethics standards to that would ensure that no investments would not be influenced by corporate campaign contributions. Buttigieg promised to work with the Indiana State Legislature to seek legislation prohibiting political contributions from banks to anyone running for state treasurer,

Buttigieg argued that Indiana had not been wisely investing taxpayer money. For instance, he criticized the investment of hundreds of millions in tollway revenue into junk bonds. Buttigieg argued that the state treasurer's office could be more efficiently and profitably managed. Buttgigieg argued that wiser management of the states finances would decrease the necessity for cuts, such as those that had been recently made to education.

Buttigieg pledged to commission a review of the state's investments in order decrease the state's Indiana's vulnerability to risky debt. Buttigieg also promised that, within his first 60 days in office, he would assemble a committee that would inform his principles and develop reporting procedures. Such a committee would be made up of financial businesses, labor representatives, academic leaders, and consumer advocacy leaders.

Buttigieg declared that, “In these tough economic times, state government needs to find new and creative ways to make our tax dollars work harder and smarter for us."

Buttigieg's campaign placed an emphasis on job-creation and economic development. He also considered a top priority to be consumer protection.

Buttigieg argued that he could use the office of Treasurer to assist in generating economic growth in the state by making investments in state assets and depositing state money in the banks most likely to recirculate dollars to local communities.

Buttigieg urged Mourdock to hold a debate with him. This was to no avail, ultimately.

In what was seen to be shaping up as a Republican wave election, Buttigieg hoped he could attract ticket splitting voters. Buttigieg made efforts to reach out to the Republican-associated Tea Party movement, declaring that he understood their economic concerns.

=== Mourdock's campaign ===
Moudock was formally renominated by the Republican Party at its state convention on June 19.

Mourdock defended his investment in Chrysler junk bonds, claiming that junk bonds had actually been the best-performing assets in the state's investment portfolio.

Mourdock defended the lawsuit he lodged against Chrysler, which cost the state $2 million, as having fulfilled his "fiduciary duties" and having been his acting on behalf of the taxpayers of Indiana. He acknowledged that some admired, and others reviled, the stand he took against Chrysler. However, he believed that the lawsuit earned him name recognition” (it had earned him hundreds of speaking engagements on the subject) and would ultimately benefit his campaign, stating, “I think that is very much going to play in our favor. I think most Hoosiers were opposed to seeing our pensioners getting ripped off, which is exactly what happened.” Mourdock collaborated with governor Mitch Daniels on an op-ed in early June The Wall Street Journal defending the lawsuit.

Mourdock received criticism during the campaign from Buttigieg for holding events with controversial figures such as television personality Glenn Beck (an appearance Buttigieg particularly criticized in light of "deceptive" cash-for-gold advertisements Beck had been featured in) and Maricopa County Sheriff Joe Arpaio.

Mourdock positioned himself in opposition to bailouts of banks. Mourdock argued that he had been wisely investing taxpayer money as treasurer. Mourdock advertised his role as Chairman of the Indiana Wireless Enhanced 911 advisory board, proclaiming that such work demonstrated his commitment to public safety. Moudrock also advertised his role Chairman of the Indiana Education Savings Authority, arguing that it demonstrated his commitment to promoting education and college savings. He pointed to the growth of the state's college savings plan as a success of his. Mourdock criticized Buttigieg's plan to impose requirements on banks seeking state deposits, accusing Buttigieg of wanting to implement "social policy".

Mourdock responded to criticism by Buttigieg of his investing by publicizing that the state treasurer's had earned $480 million in the 2010 fiscal year. Mourdock often described his role as being the states "investor-in-chief".

Mourdock's campaign was criticized by Buttigieg for accepting money from bank PACs.

Mourdock's candidacy was seen as benefiting from running in a very Republican-favorable election cycle and from being in a Republican-leaning state, making him the strong favorite to win.

== Endorsements ==
Pete Buttigieg (D)

Organizations

- AFL–CIO
- Indiana State Teachers Association
- United Automobile Workers
  - United Automobile Workers Citizenship and Legislative Committee
  - United Automobile Workers Region 3 Victory Fund

Newspapers

- Fort Wayne Journal Gazette
- Indiana Daily Student
- South Bend Tribune
- The Times of Northwest Indiana

== Result ==
Ahead of the election, the race was projected as leaning in Mourdock's favor.

Mourdock won a second term as treasurer with 62% of the vote.

Mourdock was the state's top vote-getter, receiving a greater number of votes than any other Indiana candidate in the 2010 elections.

Turnout for the race was 38.96%. Turnout for the race was slightly lower than that of the elections for other two Indiana statewide offices up for coinciding elections (auditor and secretary of state).

General election results
Party	Candidate	Votes	%
Republican	Richard Mourdock (incumbent)	1,053,527	62.46
Democratic	Pete Buttigieg	633,243	37.54
Total votes		1,686,770	

== Aftermath ==
Both candidates would go on to seek other offices.

In 2011, Buttigieg was elected mayor of South Bend, Indiana. He would be reelected mayor in 2015. During his second term as mayor Buttigieg ran unsuccessfully in the 2017 Democratic National Committee chairmanship election. Later in his second term as mayor, he launched his campaign for the Democratic nomination in the 2020 United States presidential election, which saw him rise to become a top-tier candidate in primary race. He was later appointed by President Joe Biden to be the 19th United States Secretary of Transportation.

On February 22, 2011, only months after being reelected as Indiana State Treasurer, Mourdock launched a campaign for Indiana's Class 1 United States Senate seat, up for election in 2012, challenging incumbent sixth-term Republican senator Richard Lugar for the Republican nomination. As a Tea Party Republican himself, in the primary race, Mourdock enjoyed strong Tea Party movement-backing. Mourdock defeated Lugar by a broad margin in the primary, In an October general election debate against Democratic opponent Joe Donnelly, Mourdock made controversial remarks in which he stated that pregnancy from rape was "something that God intended". Many experts saw these remarks as immensely damaging Mourdock in his Senate campaign. Mourdock would ultimately lose the general election to Donnelly by a margin of six percent.

Mourdock would ultimately not serve a full second term as Indiana State Treasurer, submitting his letter of resignation to Indiana Governor Mike Pence on August 29, 2014. Mourdock's resignation came on the last day that state employees could retire before cuts to pension benefits took effect in September 2014. Pence appointed chief financial officer and chief operating officer of the Indiana Finance Authority Daniel Huge to serve as interim treasurer.

As of the 2022 Indiana elections, it still remains the case that no Democrat has held the Indiana State Treasurer's office since 1979.

During Buttigieg's 2020 run for the Democratic presidential nomination, this election gained some attention during a televised debate when Amy Klobuchar, one of Buttigieg's opponents, cited the election as evidence that Buttigieg lacked an ability to win with larger electorates, drawing a contrast between Buttigieg's broad margin of defeat in the only statewide race he had run to the fact that she had been victorious in every statewide race she had run in herself.

In March 2020, Louis Jacobson wrote an article for Sabato's Crystal Ball which cited Buttigieg's failure to breakthrough in this election as an example of the regular inability of up-and-coming candidates to see much success in elections for statewide offices in states with single-party dominance by the opposing party.
