= Straw polls for the 2016 Republican Party presidential primaries =

The following is a list of notable straw polls for the 2016 Republican Party's presidential nomination.

== Conservative Political Action Conference ==
=== CPAC 2013 ===
Candidates	Percentage
Kentucky Senator Rand Paul	25%
Florida Senator Marco Rubio	23%
Former Pennsylvania Senator Rick Santorum	8%
New Jersey Governor Chris Christie	7%
Wisconsin Congressman Paul Ryan	6%
Wisconsin Governor Scott Walker	5%
Neurosurgeon Dr. Ben Carson	4%
Texas Senator Ted Cruz	4%
Louisiana Governor Bobby Jindal	3%
Former Alaska Governor Sarah Palin	3%
Other	14%
Undecided	1%

=== CPAC 2014 ===
Candidates	Percentage
Kentucky Senator Rand Paul	31%
Texas Senator Ted Cruz	11%
Neurosurgeon Dr. Ben Carson	9%
New Jersey Governor Chris Christie	8%
Wisconsin Governor Scott Walker	7%
Former Pennsylvania Senator Rick Santorum	7%
Florida Senator Marco Rubio	6%
Wisconsin Congressman Paul Ryan	3%
Texas Governor Rick Perry	3%
Louisiana Governor Bobby Jindal	2%
Former Secretary of State Condoleezza Rice	2%
Former Arkansas Governor Mike Huckabee	2%
Former Alaska Governor Sarah Palin	2%

=== CPAC 2015 ===
Candidates	Percentage
Kentucky Senator Rand Paul	25.7%
Wisconsin Governor Scott Walker	21.4%
Texas Senator Ted Cruz	11.5%
Neurosurgeon Dr. Ben Carson	11.4%
Former Florida Governor Jeb Bush	8.3%
Former Pennsylvania Senator Rick Santorum	4.3%
Florida Senator Marco Rubio	3.7%
Businessman Donald Trump	3.5%
Businesswoman Carly Fiorina	3.0%
New Jersey Governor Chris Christie	2.8%
Former Texas Governor Rick Perry	1.1%
Undecided	1.0%
Louisiana Governor Bobby Jindal	0.9%
Former Alaska Governor Sarah Palin	0.8%
Other	0.7%
Former Ambassador John Bolton	0.3%
Former Arkansas Governor Mike Huckabee	0.3%
South Carolina Senator Lindsey Graham	0.1%
Former New York Governor George Pataki	0.1%

=== CPAC 2016 ===
Candidates	Percentage
Texas Senator Ted Cruz	40%
Florida Senator Marco Rubio	30%
Businessman Donald Trump	15%
Ohio Governor John Kasich	8%
Neurosurgeon Dr. Ben Carson	2%
Vermont Senator Bernie Sanders	1%
Former New York City Mayor Michael Bloomberg	1%
Former Secretary of State Hillary Clinton	.3%
Other	4%
Undecided	1%

== Values Voter Summit ==
=== VVS 2013 ===
Candidates	Percentage
Texas Senator Ted Cruz	42%
Neurosurgeon Dr. Ben Carson	13%
Former Pennsylvania Senator Rick Santorum	13%
Kentucky Senator Rand Paul	6%
Florida Senator Marco Rubio	5%

=== VVS 2014 ===
Candidates	Percentage
Texas Senator Ted Cruz	25%
Neurosurgeon Dr. Ben Carson	20%
Former Arkansas Governor Mike Huckabee	12%

=== VVS 2015 ===
Candidates	Percentage
Texas Senator Ted Cruz	42%
Neurosurgeon Dr. Ben Carson	18%
Former Arkansas Governor Mike Huckabee	14%
Florida Senator Marco Rubio	13%
CEO Donald Trump	5%

== Southern Republican Leadership Conference ==
=== SRLC 2014 ===
Finish	Candidate	Percentage
1	Ted Cruz	30.33%
2	Ben Carson	29.38%
3	Rand Paul	10.43%
4	Mike Huckabee	5.06%
5	Rick Perry	4.9%

=== SRLC 2015 ===
The poll was held at the conference May 23, 2015, in Oklahoma City.

Ben Carson – 25.4%
Scott Walker – 20.5%
Ted Cruz – 16.6%
Chris Christie 5.3%
Rick Perry – 5.0%
Jeb Bush – 4.9%
Rand Paul – 4.1%
Marco Rubio – 4.1%
Bobby Jindal – 4.1%
Carly Fiorina – 2.7%
Mike Huckabee – 2.7%
Rick Santorum – 1.9%
Donald Trump – 1.2%
Mark Everson – 0.8%
Lindsey Graham – 0.5%
John Kasich – 0.2%
Jim Gilmore - 0%

== Western Conservative Summit ==
=== WCS 2014 ===
Ben Carson – 22%
Ted Cruz – 13%
Sarah Palin - 12%

=== WCS 2015 ===
Ben Carson – 224 / 26%
Carly Fiorina – 201 / 23%
Scott Walker – 192 / 22%
Ted Cruz - 100 / 11%
Rand Paul – 34 / 3.9%
Marco Rubio – 24 / 2.8%
Rick Perry – 20 / 2.3%
Rick Santorum – 16 / 1.8%
Donald Trump – 15 / 1.7%
Mike Huckabee – 13 / 1.5%
Bobby Jindal – 9 / 1%
Bill Armstrong – 6 / 0.7%
Jeb Bush – 4 / 0.5%
John Kasich – 4 / 0.5%
Chris Christie - 3 / 0.3%
Lindsey Graham – 3 / 0.3%
Mitt Romney - 3 / 0.3%
George Pataki - 0 / 0%

== February 25, 2015 - Washington State Republican Party Straw Poll ==
Finish	Potential candidate	Percentage	Votes
1	Ben Carson	37%	823
2	Scott Walker	15%	333
3	Mitt Romney	9%	200
4	Ted Cruz	7%	153
5	Rand Paul	7%	149
N/A	Others/Write-In	3%	65
6	Jeb Bush	3%	60
7	Mike Huckabee	3%	59
8	Marco Rubio	2%	45
9	Rick Perry	2%	40
10	Trey Gowdy	2%	36
11	Bobby Jindal	1%	32
12	Allen West	1%	28
13	Ron Paul	1%	25
14	Sarah Palin	1%	24
15	John Kasich	1%	21
16	Condoleezza Rice	1%	21
17	Undecided	1%	21
18	Chris Christie	1%	20
19	Paul Ryan	1%	19
20	Susana Martinez	1%	13
21	Newt Gingrich	1%	12
22	Rick Santorum	<1%	11

== February 25, 2015 - National Republican Trust Political Action Committee Straw Poll ==
Finish	Potential candidate	Percentage	Votes
1	Ben Carson	67%	10,620
2	Scott Walker	12%	1,935
3	Ted Cruz	10%	1,557
4	Mitt Romney	4%	615
5	Marco Rubio	3%	555
6	Rand Paul	2%	325
7	Rick Perry	1%	160
8	Mike Huckabee	<1%	75
9	Paul Ryan	<1%	50
10	Rick Santorum	<1%	40
11	Jeb Bush	<1%	10
12	Bobby Jindal	<1%	10
13	George Pataki	0%	0
14	Chris Christie	0%	0

== March 14, 2015 - Georgia Association of Republican County Chairmen Straw Poll ==
The GA-ARCC straw poll was held in over 30 counties as part of Republican county conventions in Georgia:

Finish	Potential candidate	Percentage	Votes
1	Scott Walker	39%	536
2	Rand Paul	14%	189
3	Ben Carson	9%	127
4	Jeb Bush	7%	98
5	Ted Cruz	6%	76
6	Mike Huckabee	5%	71
7	Marco Rubio	4%	48
8	Mitt Romney	2%	30
9	Rick Perry	2%	29
10	Bobby Jindal	2%	21
11	Chris Christie	1%	13
12	John Kasich	1%	11
	Other/Undecided	8%	117

== June 27, 2015 - Citizens United Straw Poll ==
Ben Carson – 18.0%
Scott Walker – 17.9%
Ted Cruz – 15.9%
Donald Trump - 13.1%
Marco Rubio - 5.5%
Rand Paul – 5.0%
Jeb Bush - 4.5%
Rick Perry - 4.0%
Mike Huckabee - 3.7%
Carly Fiorina – 2.6%
John Kasich - 2.0%
Rick Santorum – 1.0%
Bobby Jindal - .8%
Chris Christie – 0.7%
Lindsey Graham – 0.1%
George Pataki – 0%
Other - 1.0%
Undecided - 4.0%

== July 20, 2015 - Washington, D.C. Republican Party Straw Poll ==
Finish	Candidate	Percentage
1	Ben Carson	44%
2	Jeb Bush	17%
3	Marco Rubio	11%
4	Scott Walker	7%

== September 20, 2015 - Michigan Republican Party Straw Poll ==
Finish	Candidate	Percentage
1	Rand Paul	22%
2	Carly Fiorina	15%
3	John Kasich	13%
4	Ted Cruz	7%
5	Jeb Bush	9%
6	Marco Rubio	8%
7	Donald Trump	6%
8	Ben Carson	5%
9	Scott Walker	2%

== October 8–18, 2015 - Georgia National Fair "Peanut Poll" Straw Poll ==
Finish	Candidate	Votes	Percentage
1	Ben Carson	8,576	36.86%
2	Donald Trump	8,099	34.81%
3	Carly Fiorina	1,203	5.17%
4	Marco Rubio	1,064	4.57%
5	Ted Cruz	778	3.34%
6	Jeb Bush	629	2.70%
7	Mike Huckabee	597	2.57%
8	Rand Paul	234	1.01%
9	John Kasich	132	0.57%
10	Chris Christie	129	0.55%
11	Rick Santorum	98	0.42%
12	Lindsey Graham	80	0.34%
13	Bobby Jindal	78	0.34%
14	George Pataki	65	0.28%
15	Jim Gilmore	42	0.18%
16	Undecided	1,464	6.29%

== October 19, 2015 - North Carolina Tea Party Caucus ==
Finish	Candidate	Percentage
1	Ted Cruz	51%
2	Ben Carson	42.05%
3	Carly Fiorina	0.77%
