= Scott Wheeler =

Scott Wheeler may refer to:

- Scott Wheeler (composer) (born 1952), American concert-music composer.
- Scott Wheeler (makeup artist), American special makeup effects artist.
- Scott Wheeler (politician) (born 1965), Republican politician in Vermont.
- Scott Wheeler (reporter) (born 1963), an American investigative reporter.
