= 2012 United States Senate election in Indiana =

- November 6, 2012
- Turnout: 58.5%
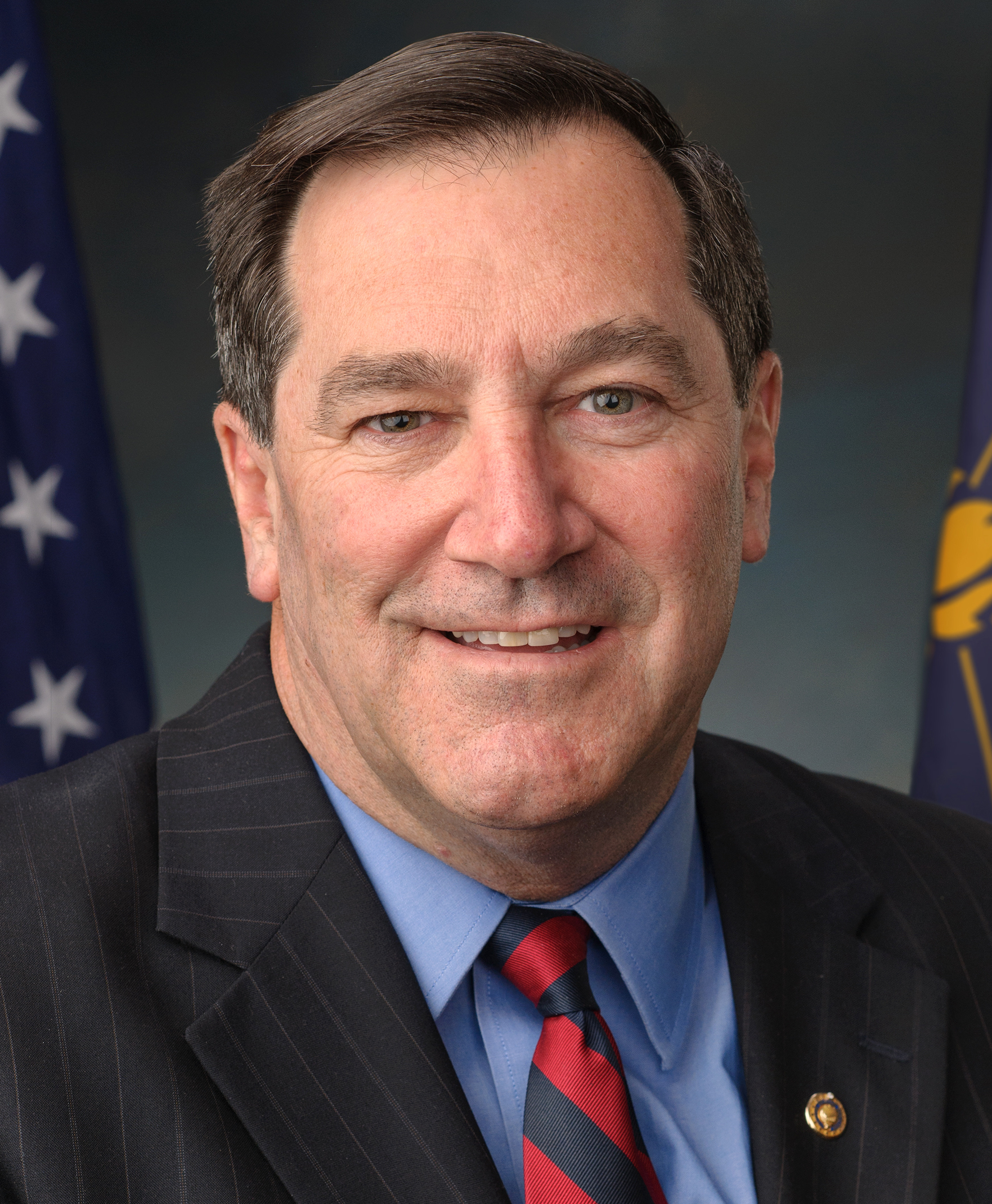

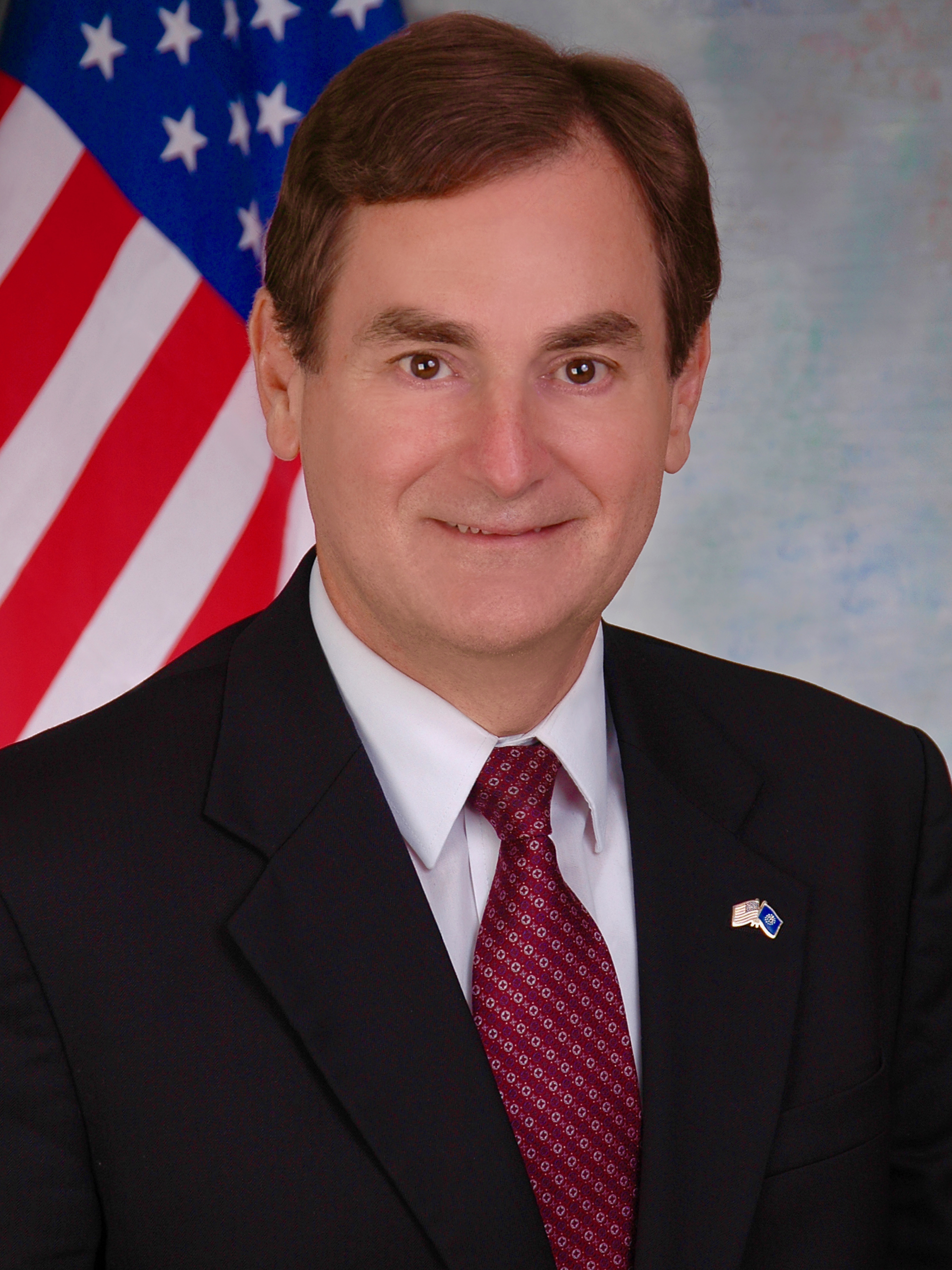

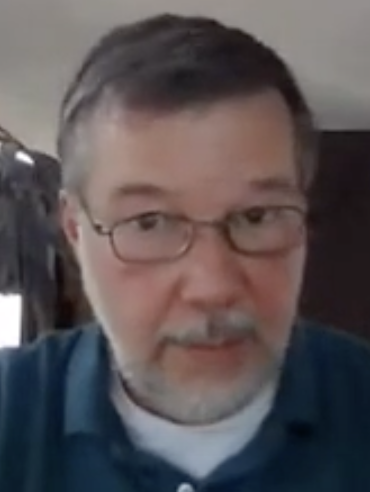
Nominee	Joe Donnelly	Richard Mourdock	Andy Horning
Party	Democratic	Republican	Libertarian
Popular vote	1,281,181	1,133,621	145,282
Percentage	50.04%	44.28%	5.68%
- Donnelly: 40–50% 50–60% 60–70% 70–80% 80–90% 90%+ Mourdock: 40–50% 50–60% 60–70% 70–80% 80–90% 90%+ Tie: 40–50% 50%
U.S. senator before election
Richard Lugar
Republican
Elected U.S. Senator
Joe Donnelly
Democratic

The 2012 United States Senate election in Indiana took place on November 6, 2012, concurrently with the U.S. presidential election, other elections to the United States Senate and House of Representatives, and various state and local elections. Incumbent Republican U.S. Senator Richard Lugar ran for reelection to a seventh term, but was defeated in the primary by Tea Party-backed Richard Mourdock. Lugar was the longest-serving senator ever to lose renomination.

U.S. Representative Joe Donnelly, a Democrat from Indiana's 2nd congressional district, was unopposed in his party's primary, and then defeated both Mourdock and Libertarian Andrew Horning in the general election. Alongside the concurrent election for state superintendent, this was the last time a Democrat would win a statewide election in Indiana until 2026. This was also the last Senate election in which an elected incumbent was defeated in the primary until 2026, (Note: U.S. Senator Luther Strange lost a primary election to Roy Moore in 2017 after being appointed by the governor to fill an empty seat.) and the last time either party would flip a Senate seat in a presidential election year without carrying the state in the concurrent presidential election. Additionally, it was the last time until 2024 where the opposite party picked up a seat in a cycle after losing the previous one a cycle earlier.

== Background and overview ==
On November 7, 2006, incumbent Richard Lugar was unopposed by any major party candidate as no Democrat filed for the May 2006 primary. He was re-elected to his sixth six-year term with 87.3% of the vote. After the 2012 election, Lugar would have had an even chance, according to Senate Republican Conference rules, to be elected as its president pro tempore. However, the issue was rendered moot with Lugar's primary loss on May 9, 2012, as Indiana state law prohibits candidates from running for an election after losing a primary. Time featured the race in their "Fury of the Senate" article. The article mentioned how Donnelly was lucky that Mourdock won out in the primary against Lugar, a well-liked centrist member of the GOP. Another boost came when Mourdock's remarks regarding rape helped propel Donnelly to victory.

== Republican primary ==
The Republican primary was held on May 8, 2012.

=== Candidates ===
==== Declared ====
- Richard Lugar, incumbent U.S. senator
- Richard Mourdock, state treasurer

==== Declined ====
- Mike Delph, state senator
- Bob Thomas, auto dealer

=== Campaign ===
Due to Lugar's unpopularity among some Tea Party voters because of his positions regarding illegal immigration, voting to confirm then-U.S. Supreme Court nominees Sonia Sotomayor and Elena Kagan, the DREAM Act, the New START Treaty, some gun control bills, and congressional earmarks, he was challenged by a Tea Party-backed candidate.

The Indiana Debate Commission's GOP primary debate with Sen. Richard Lugar and State Treasurer Richard Mourdock was set to air at 7 p.m. EDT on Wednesday, April 11. In a widely published poll taken March 26 to 28, Lugar was still in the lead, but by the time of a second published poll from April 30 to May 1, Mourdock was leading 48% to 38%.

Mourdock defeated Senator Lugar in the Republican primary on May 8, 2012.

According to Indiana law, Lugar's defeat meant that he would not be permitted to run in the election either as a third party or an independent candidate after he lost the primary.

=== Endorsements ===
Richard Lugar

Executive branch officials

- Dr. Condoleezza Rice, former U.S. secretary of state
- George P. Shultz, former U.S. secretary of state for the Reagan administration

U.S. senators

- John McCain, United States senator (R-AZ) and 2008 Republican presidential nominee
- Alan K. Simpson, former U.S. senator (R-WY); former chairman of the National Commission on Fiscal Responsibility and Reform

Statewide officials

- Haley Barbour, former governor of Mississippi
- Mitch Daniels, governor of Indiana
- Becky Skillman, lt. governor of Indiana

State legislators

- Beverly Gard, Indiana state senator (R-Greenfield)

Local officials

- Greg Ballard, mayor of Indianapolis
- James Brainard, mayor of Carmel
- Jon Costas, mayor of Valparaiso
- John Dennis, mayor of West Lafayette
- William H. Hudnut, former mayor of Indianapolis
- Robert Stewart, former mayor of Columbus

Individuals

- Pat Boone, singer, actor and writer
- Tom J. Donohue, former president and CEO of the American Trucking Association, and president and CEO of U.S. Chamber of Commerce
- Frank Luntz, political consultant, pollster, Republican Party strategist, and Fox News commentator

Organizations

- Christian Coalition
- The Indiana Hardwood Lumbermen's Association
- National Defense PAC
- National Right to Life
- United States Chamber of Commerce
Richard Mourdock

Individuals

- Sharron Angle, former Nevada assemblywoman and 2010 Republican nominee for U.S. Senate from Nevada
- Michele Bachmann, congresswoman from Minnesota; 2012 presidential candidate
- Morton Blackwell, activist
- Herman Cain, former CEO of Godfather's Pizza; 2012 presidential candidate
- Erick Erickson, managing editor of RedState
- Steve Forbes, editor-in-chief of Forbes; presidential candidate in 1996 and 2000
- Mark Levin, radio talk show host
- Michelle Malkin, conservative author, blogger, and commentator
- Dick Morris, political strategist, author, Fox News analyst, and former presidential adviser to Bill Clinton
- Grover Norquist, political activist and president of Americans for Tax Reform
- Sarah Palin, former governor of Alaska and 2008 Republican vice presidential nominee
- Rick Santorum, former senator from Pennsylvania; 2012 presidential candidate

Organizations

- American Conservative Union
- Americans for Legal Immigration
- Americans for Prosperity
- Citizens United
- Club for Growth
- Concerned Women for America
- Eagle Forum
- Family Research Council
- FreedomWorks
- Gun Owners of America
- Indiana Right to Life
- Minuteman PAC
- Minuteman Project
- National Association for Gun Rights
- National Federation of Republican Assemblies
- National Republican Trust Political Action Committee
- NRA Political Victory Fund
- Republican National Coalition for Life
- Tea Party Express

=== Polling ===
Poll source	Date(s) administered	Sample size	Margin of error	Richard Mourdock	Richard Lugar	Undecided
Basswood Research (R)	July 23–24, 2011	500	±4.4%	34%	32%	34%
American Viewpoint (R)	July 27–28, 2011	600	±4.0%	31%	45%	23%
Howey Politics/DePauw University	March 26–28, 2012	503	±4.5%	35%	42%	28%
Howey Politics/DePauw University	April 30 – May 1, 2012	700	±3.7%	48%	38%	14%

=== Results ===
Results by county: Mourdock—70–80% Mourdock—60–70% Mourdock—50–60% Lugar—50–60%

Republican primary results
Party	Candidate	Votes	%
Republican	Richard Mourdock	400,321	60.5%
Republican	Richard Lugar (incumbent)	261,285	39.5%
Total votes		661,606	100.0%

== Democratic primary ==
=== Candidates ===
==== Declared ====
- Joe Donnelly, U.S. representative from Indiana's 2nd congressional district

==== Declined ====
- Brad Ellsworth, former U.S. representative from Indiana's 8th congressional district and nominee for the U.S. Senate in 2010
- Baron Hill, former U.S. representative from Indiana's 9th congressional district

=== Results ===
Donnelly was unopposed for the Democratic nomination.

Democratic primary results
Party	Candidate	Votes	%
Democratic	Joe Donnelly	207,715	100.00%
Total votes		207,715	100.00%

== General election ==
=== Candidates ===
- Joe Donnelly (D), U.S. representative
- Andrew Horning (L), product manager and nominee for governor in 2008
- Richard Mourdock (R), Indiana state treasurer

=== Debates ===
Confirmed debates with Donnelly, Horning and Mourdock were:

Date: Monday, October 15
Broadcast time: 7 p.m. EDT
City: Indianapolis
Venue: WFYI-TV (in studio/no live audience)

- Complete video of debate, October 15, 2012 – C-SPAN

Date: Tuesday, October 23
Broadcast time: 7 p.m. EDT
City: New Albany
Venue: Paul W. Ogle Cultural & Community Center, Indiana University Southeast (live audience – seating up to 500)

- Complete video of debate, October 23, 2012 – C-SPAN

=== Fundraising ===
Candidate (party)	Receipts	Disbursements	Cash on hand	Debt
Joe Donnelly (D)	$5,572,319	$5,496,760	$95,578	$0
Richard Mourdock (R)	$8,982,053	$8,698,721	$283,332	$0
Andy Horning (L)	$4,907	$2,905	$2,005	$0
Source: Federal Election Commission

==== Top contributors ====
Joe Donnelly	Contribution	Richard Mourdock	Contribution
Faegre Baker Daniels	$30,942	Club for Growth	$290,815
MacAndrews & Forbes	$29,500	Senate Conservatives Fund	$58,728
Renco Group	$27,400	Koch Industries	$30,000
Barnes & Thornburg	$22,601	Murray Energy	$15,000
University of Notre Dame	$20,150	Lucas Oil	$11,400
MWH Global WPP plc	$17,000	ESOP Association	$10,750
Eli Lilly and Company	$16,912	Blue Cross Blue Shield Association	$10,250
Power, Rogers & Smith	$16,000	American Bankers Association	$10,000
Mid Manhattan PAC	$13,750	ExxonMobil	$10,000
Patton Boggs LLP	$13,083	Citizens United	$10,000
Source: OpenSecrets

==== Top industries ====
Joe Donnelly	Contribution	Richard Mourdock	Contribution
Lawyers/law firms	$463,098	Republican/Conservative PACs	$474,661
Leadership PACs	$298,000	Leadership PACs	$305,607
Retired	$192,716	Retired	$244,206
Lobbyists	$109,987	Oil & gas	$132,530
Building trade unions	$77,000	Financial institutions	$90,200
Financial institutions	$100,235	Commercial banks	$88,430
Education	$91,563	Health professionals	$86,567
Building trade unions	$63,500	Misc. finance	$64,815
Public sector unions	$87,000	Manufacturing industry	$60,200
Political action committees	$63,798	Real estate	$58,290
Source: OpenSecrets

=== Campaign ===
==== Pregnancy from rape controversy ====
Mourdock became embroiled in a controversy after stating that pregnancy from rape is "something that God intended". His remarks were made during a debate on October 23, 2012, while explaining his opposition to abortion even in the case of rape. At the debate Mourdock, when asked what his position on abortion was, responded:

I know there are some who disagree and I respect their point of view but I believe that life begins at conception. The only exception I have to have an abortion is in that case of the life of the mother. I just struggled with it myself for a long time but I came to realize: "Life is that gift from God that I think even if life begins in that horrible situation of rape, that it is something that God intended to happen".

Media speculated that this could affect the outcome of the Senate race and presidential race, and multiple sources noted the similarities with the rape and pregnancy statement controversies in the 2012 United States elections.

Responding to the criticism, Mourdock issued a statement saying: "God creates life, and that was my point. God does not want rape, and by no means was I suggesting that he does. Rape is a horrible thing, and for anyone to twist my words otherwise is absurd and sick." He was later quoted at a press conference as saying: "I believe God controls the universe. I don't believe biology works in an uncontrolled fashion." He however refused to issue an apology, even while prominent Republicans, including Sen. John McCain, called for him to do so.

==== Response ====
A day before the controversy started, a television ad began airing that showed Governor Mitt Romney, the Republican nominee for United States president, supporting Mourdock. The Romney campaign subsequently issued a statement saying "Gov. Romney disagrees with Richard Mourdock's comments, and they do not reflect his views," but did not pull the ad. Senator John Cornyn, chairman of the National Republican Senatorial Committee, said "Richard and I, along with millions of Americans—including even Joe Donnelly—believe that life is a gift from God. To try and construe his words as anything other than a restatement of that belief is irresponsible and ridiculous".

Many public Republicans called for Mourdock to apologize for the statement. Sen. John McCain called for him to issue an apology and his support "depends on what he does." Senator Scott Brown refused to state that he supported Mourdock in the election. Rep. Mike Pence, a Republican running for governor of Indiana concurrent to Mourdock's senatorial campaign, urged Mourdock to apologize. "I strongly disagree with the statement made by Richard Mourdock during last night's Senate debate," he said in a statement. "I urge him to apologize."

President Obama stated, "Rape is rape. It is a crime," on the Tonight Show. He continued, "These various distinctions about rape don't make too much sense to me." Dan Parker, chairman of the Indiana Democratic Party, immediately criticized Mourdock, saying: "I'm stunned and ashamed that Richard Mourdock believes God intended rape", and claimed that he is an "extremist" who is out of touch with Indiana.

=== Predictions ===
Source	Ranking	As of
The Cook Political Report	Tossup	November 1, 2012
Sabato's Crystal Ball	Lean D (flip)	November 5, 2012
Rothenberg Political Report	Tilt D (flip)	November 2, 2012
Real Clear Politics	Tossup	November 5, 2012

=== Polling ===
Poll source	Date(s) administered	Sample size	Margin of error	Richard Mourdock (R)	Joe Donnelly (D)	Andrew Horning (L)	Other	Undecided
Howey Politics/DePauw University	March 26–28, 2012	503	± 4.4%	35%	35%	7%	—	23%
Rasmussen Reports	May 23–24, 2012	600	± 4.0%	42%	42%	—	2%	14%
Rasmussen Reports	July 31 – August 1, 2012	400	± 5.0%	42%	40%	—	3%	15%
Market Research Insight	August 6–9, 2012	600	± 4.0%	41%	39%	3%	—	17%
Howey Politics/DePauw University	September 19–23, 2012	800	± 3.5%	38%	40%	7%	—	8%
Rasmussen Reports	October 10–11, 2012	600	± 4.0%	47%	42%	—	2%	8%
Pharos Research	October 19–21, 2012	754	± 3.6%	46%	46%	—	—	8%
Howey Politics/DePauw University	October 28–30, 2012	800	± 3.5%	36%	47%	6%	—	11%
Rasmussen Reports	November 1, 2012	600	± 4.0%	42%	45%	6%	—	6%

Hypothetical polling

with Richard Lugar

Poll source	Date(s) administered	Sample size	Margin of error	Richard Lugar (R)	Joe Donnelly (D)	Other	Undecided
Howey Politics/DePauw University	March 26–28, 2012	503	± 4.4%	50%	29%	—	21%

=== Results ===
State senate district results

On election night, Donnelly won by about six percent. Donnelly performed well in Marion County, home of Indianapolis. Donnelly also won areas with major college campuses, such as Indiana University in Bloomington and Purdue University in Lafayette. Mourdock performed well as expected in the Indianapolis suburbs, such as Hamilton County. Mourdock conceded defeat to Donnelly at around 11:30 p.m. EST.

United States Senate election in Indiana, 2012
Party	Candidate	Votes	%	±%
Democratic	Joe Donnelly	1,281,181	50.04%	+50.04%
Republican	Richard Mourdock	1,133,621	44.28%	−43.08%
Libertarian	Andy Horning	145,282	5.68%	−6.91%
Write-in		18	0.00%	-0.06%
Total votes		2,560,102	100.00%	N/A
Democratic gain from Republican				

==== Results by county ====
County	Joe Donnelly Democratic		Richard Mourdock Republican		Andrew Horning Libertarian		Write-ins		Margin		Total
County	Votes	%	Votes	%	Votes	%	Votes	%	Votes	%	Total
Adams	4,613	36.0%	7,426	57.9%	784	6.1%	0	0.0%	-2,813	-21.9%	12,823
Allen	65,053	45.3%	71,734	49.9%	6,936	4.8%	3	0.0%	-6,681	-4.6%	143,726
Bartholomew	12,214	42.5%	14,430	50.2%	2,075	7.2%	0	0.0%	-2,216	-7.7%	28,719
Benton	1,416	40.3%	1,798	51.1%	303	8.6%	0	0.0%	-382	-10.8%	3,517
Blackford	2,228	47.7%	2,059	44.1%	379	8.1%	0	0.0%	169	3.6%	4,666
Boone	10,251	37.5%	15,007	54.9%	2,066	7.6%	0	0.0%	-4,756	-17.4%	27,324
Brown	3,476	45.9%	3,544	46.8%	549	7.3%	0	0.0%	-68	-0.9%	7,569
Carroll	3,194	41.2%	3,916	50.5%	637	8.2%	0	0.0%	-722	-9.3%	7,747
Cass	6,323	44.9%	6,622	47.0%	1,135	8.1%	0	0.0%	-299	-2.1%	14,080
Clark	22,776	49.3%	21,120	45.8%	2,262	4.9%	0	0.0%	1,656	3.5%	46,158
Clay	4,359	42.4%	5,192	50.5%	733	7.1%	1	0.0%	-833	-8.1%	10,285
Clinton	3,931	40.5%	4,938	50.9%	832	8.6%	0	0.0%	-1,007	-10.4%	9,701
Crawford	2,256	50.5%	2,000	44.8%	212	4.7%	0	0.0%	256	-5.7%	4,468
Daviess	3,295	33.5%	6,088	61.8%	463	4.7%	0	0.0%	-2,793	-28.3%	9,846
Dearborn	7,313	33.7%	13,422	61.9%	956	4.4%	0	0.0%	-6,109	-28.2%	21,691
Decatur	3,478	36.2%	5,302	55.1%	840	8.7%	0	0.0%	-1,824	-17.9%	9,620
DeKalb	6,059	38.1%	8,793	55.4%	1,033	6.5%	0	0.0%	-2,734	-17.3%	15,885
Delaware	24,525	56.5%	15,797	36.4%	3,052	7.0%	0	0.0%	8,728	20.1%	43,374
Dubois	8,054	44.6%	9,143	50.6%	861	4.8%	0	0.0%	-1,089	-6.0%	18,058
Elkhart	28,230	42.0%	35,858	53.4%	3,100	4.6%	0	0.0%	-7,628	-11.4%	67,188
Fayette	3,856	47.9%	3,498	43.4%	694	8.6%	5	0.1%	358	4.5%	8,053
Floyd	16,602	47.8%	16,568	47.7%	1,553	4.5%	1	0.0%	34	0.1%	34,724
Fountain	2,738	39.4%	3,541	50.9%	672	9.7%	0	0.0%	-803	-11.5%	6,951
Franklin	3,512	34.4%	6,192	60.6%	509	5.0%	0	0.0%	-2,680	-26.2%	10,213
Fulton	3,555	43.8%	4,123	50.9%	430	5.3%	0	0.0%	-568	-7.1%	8,108
Gibson	6,339	43.3%	7,562	51.7%	728	5.0%	0	0.0%	-2,680	-8.4%	10,213
Grant	10,789	43.4%	12,549	50.4%	1,545	6.2%	0	0.0%	-1,760	-7.0%	24,883
Greene	5,480	42.7%	6,494	50.7%	845	6.6%	0	0.0%	-1,014	-8.0%	12,819
Hamilton	52,925	39.5%	72,587	54.1%	8,580	6.4%	0	0.0%	-19,662	-14.6%	134,092
Hancock	11,677	36.1%	17,635	54.5%	3,061	9.5%	0	0.0%	-5,958	-18.4%	32,373
Harrison	7,768	44.3%	9,005	51.4%	759	4.3%	0	0.0%	-1,237	-7.1%	17,532
Hendricks	25,208	38.7%	35,541	54.6%	4,379	6.7%	0	0.0%	-10,333	-15.9%	65,128
Henry	8,914	47.6%	8,000	42.7%	1,816	9.7%	0	0.0%	914	4.9%	18,730
Howard	17,660	51.8%	15,739	46.2%	684	2.0%	0	0.0%	1,921	5.6%	34,083
Huntington	5,166	34.0%	9,077	59.7%	963	6.3%	0	0.0%	-3,911	-25.7%	15,206
Jackson	7,045	42.8%	8,292	50.4%	1,108	6.7%	0	0.0%	-1,247	-7.6%	16,445
Jasper	5,335	42.7%	6,673	53.4%	480	3.8%	0	0.0%	-1,338	-10.7%	12,488
Jay	3,295	44.7%	3,533	48.0%	540	7.3%	0	0.0%	-238	-3.3%	7,368
Jefferson	6,104	49.5%	5,624	45.6%	610	4.9%	0	0.0%	480	3.9%	12,338
Jennings	4,441	44.1%	4,937	49.0%	697	6.9%	0	0.0%	-496	-4.9%	10,075
Johnson	21,256	37.2%	31,259	55.2%	4,282	7.5%	0	0.0%	-10,273	-18.0%	57,067
Knox	6,873	46.9%	6,959	47.5%	829	5.7%	0	0.0%	-86	-0.6%	14,661
Kosciusko	8,239	27.7%	19,908	66.9%	1,598	5.4%	0	0.0%	-11,669	-39.2%	29,745
LaGrange	3,300	35.8%	5,293	57.4%	626	6.8%	0	0.0%	-1,993	-17.6%	9,219
Lake	126,736	69.3%	52,072	28.5%	4,108	2.2%	0	0.0%	74,664	40.8%	182,916
LaPorte	26,764	62.8%	14,033	32.9%	1,830	4.3%	0	0.0%	12,731	29.9%	42,627
Lawrence	7,008	40.0%	9,365	53.4%	1,152	6.6%	0	0.0%	-2,357	-13.4%	17,525
Madison	27,183	52.5%	20,422	39.4%	4,162	8.0%	0	0.0%	-2,357	-13.1%	17,525
Marion	227,858	64.1%	106,919	30.1%	20,802	5.9%	0	0.0%	120,939	34.0%	355,579
Marshall	7,867	44.6%	8,930	50.6%	836	4.7%	0	0.0%	-1,063	-6.0%	17,633
Martin	1,796	38.5%	2,606	55.9%	260	5.6%	0	0.0%	-810	-17.4%	4,662
Miami	4,925	39.4%	6,363	50.9%	1,209	9.7%	0	0.0%	-1,438	-11.5%	12,497
Monroe	35,421	62.8%	17,633	31.3%	3,330	5.9%	0	0.0%	17,788	31.5%	56,384
Montgomery	5,291	37.0%	7,622	53.2%	1,401	9.8%	0	0.0%	-2,331	-16.2%	14,314
Morgan	9,777	35.0%	15,867	56.9%	2,254	8.1%	0	0.0%	-6,090	-21.9%	27,898
Newton	2,588	46.5%	2,719	48.8%	264	4.7%	0	0.0%	-131	-2.3%	5,571
Noble	5,939	37.4%	8,946	56.3%	1,005	6.3%	1	0.0%	-3,007	-18.9%	15,891
Ohio	1,116	40.4%	1,536	55.6%	108	3.9%	1	0.0%	-420	-15.2%	2,761
Orange	3,242	42.7%	3,959	52.2%	385	5.1%	1	0.0%	-717	-9.5%	7,587
Owen	3,270	41.0%	4,033	50.5%	678	8.5%	0	0.0%	-763	-9.5%	7,981
Parke	2,672	41.8%	3,168	49.5%	555	8.7%	0	0.0%	-496	-7.7%	6,395
Perry	4,722	61.1%	2,660	34.4%	342	4.4%	0	0.0%	2,062	26.7%	7,724
Pike	2,676	46.1%	2,781	47.9%	346	6.0%	0	0.0%	-105	-1.8%	5,803
Porter	42,062	58.4%	27,481	38.1%	2,522	3.5%	0	0.0%	14,581	20.3%	72,065
Posey	5,605	46.3%	5,897	48.7%	613	5.1%	0	0.0%	-292	-2.4%	12,115
Pulaski	2,284	43.6%	2,640	50.4%	313	6.0%	0	0.0%	-356	-6.8%	5,237
Putnam	5,196	39.8%	6,839	52.4%	1,008	7.7%	0	0.0%	-1,643	-12.6%	13,043
Randolph	4,073	43.1%	4,650	49.2%	722	7.6%	0	0.0%	-577	-6.1%	9,445
Ripley	3,818	35.5%	6,394	59.5%	530	4.9%	0	0.0%	-2,576	-24.0%	10,742
Rush	2,729	39.8%	3,392	49.5%	736	10.7%	0	0.0%	-663	-9.7%	6,857
Scott	4,552	53.2%	3,589	41.9%	422	4.9%	0	0.0%	963	11.3%	8,563
Shelby	6,282	39.7%	8,083	51.1%	1,458	9.2%	0	0.0%	-1,801	-11.4%	15,823
Spencer	4,650	48.7%	4,451	46.6%	444	4.7%	1	0.0%	199	2.1%	9,546
St. Joseph	65,689	59.7%	40,418	36.7%	4,006	3.6%	2	0.0%	25,271	23.0%	110,115
Starke	4,484	52.5%	3,607	42.2%	447	5.2%	1	0.0%	877	10.3%	8,539
Steuben	5,443	40.4%	7,056	52.4%	977	7.2%	0	0.0%	-1.613	-12.0%	13,476
Sullivan	4,134	51.0%	3,491	43.1%	481	5.9%	0	0.0%	643	7.9%	8,106
Switzerland	1,536	46.6%	1,581	48.0%	176	5.3%	0	0.0%	-45	-1.4%	3,293
Tippecanoe	29,181	52.0%	23,130	41.2%	3,848	6.9%	0	0.0%	6,051	10.8%	56,159
Tipton	3,001	41.7%	3,533	49.1%	664	9.2%	0	0.0%	-532	-7.4%	7,198
Union	1,098	36.4%	1,732	57.4%	185	6.1%	0	0.0%	-634	-21.0%	3,015
Vanderburgh	35,430	49.5%	32,947	46.1%	3,165	4.4%	0	0.0%	2,483	3.4%	71,542
Vermillion	3,543	54.5%	2,490	38.3%	468	7.2%	0	0.0%	1,053	16.2%	6,501
Vigo	22,342	57.2%	14,233	36.4%	2,501	6.4%	1	0.0%	8,109	20.8%	39,077
Wabash	4,454	35.6%	7,287	58.2%	775	6.2%	0	0.0%	-2,833	-22.6%	12,516
Warren	1,615	43.0%	1,887	50.3%	252	6.7%	0	0.0%	-272	-7.3%	3,754
Warrick	12,117	43.3%	14,581	52.1%	1,290	4.6%	0	0.0%	-2,464	-8.8%	27,988
Washington	4,571	42.9%	5,512	51.8%	563	5.3%	0	0.0%	-941	-8.9%	10,646
Wayne	11,752	46.5%	11,529	45.6%	1,999	7.9%	0	0.0%	223	0.9%	25,280
Wells	3,668	31.1%	7,456	63.3%	663	5.6%	0	0.0%	-3,788	-32.2%	11,787
White	4,291	43.9%	4,526	46.3%	968	9.9%	0	0.0%	-235	-2.4%	9,785
Whitley	5,157	35.1%	8,584	58.4%	955	6.5%	0	0.0%	-3,427	-23.3%	14,696
TOTAL	1,282,729	50.0%	1,135,678	44.3%	145,356	5.7%	18	0.0%	147,051	5.7%	2,563,781

Counties that flipped from Republican to Democratic

- Madison (largest city: Anderson)
- Spencer (largest city: Santa Claus)
- Starke (largest city: Knox)
- Vanderburgh (largest city: Evansville)
- Scott (largest city: Scottsburg)
- Blackford (largest city: Hartford City)
- Clark (largest city: Jeffersonville)
- Crawford (largest city: Marengo)
- Floyd (largest city: New Albany)
- Jefferson (largest city: Madison)
- Fayette (largest city: Connersville)
- Henry (largest city: New Castle)
- Howard (largest city: Kokomo)
- Wayne (largest city: Richmond)
- Vermillion (largest city: Clinton)
- Perry (largest city: Tell City)
- Sullivan (largest city: Sullivan)
- Delaware (largest city: Muncie)
- LaPorte (largest city: Michigan City)
- Tippecanoe (largest city: Lafayette)
- Porter (largest city: Portage)
- Vigo (largest city: Terre Haute)
- Monroe (largest city: Bloomington)
- St. Joseph (largest city: South Bend)
- Marion (largest city: Indianapolis)
- Lake (largest city: Hammond)

==== By congressional district ====
Donnelly won five of nine congressional districts, including three held by Republicans.

District	Donnelly	Mourdock	Representative
1st	66.31%	30.99%	Pete Visclosky
2nd	49.94%	45.42%	Joe Donnelly (112th Congress)
2nd	49.94%	45.42%	Jackie Walorski (113th Congress)
3rd	40.47%	53.96%	Marlin Stutzman
4th	43.56%	49.03%	Todd Rokita
5th	47.36%	46.18%	Dan Burton (112th Congress)
5th	47.36%	46.18%	Susan Brooks (113th Congress)
6th	43.68%	48.93%	Mike Pence (112th Congress)
6th	43.68%	48.93%	Luke Messer (113th Congress)
7th	66.03%	28.00%	André Carson
8th	47.74%	46.84%	Larry Bucshon
9th	46.81%	47.20%	Todd Young

== See also ==
- 2012 United States Senate elections
- 2012 United States House of Representatives elections in Indiana
- 2012 Indiana gubernatorial election
- Politics of the United States
- Federal government of the United States
