= Chris Chocola =

American politician (born 1962)

- Official portrait, 2003

Member of the U.S. House of Representatives from Indiana's 2nd district
- In office January 3, 2003 – January 3, 2007
- Preceded by: Tim Roemer (redistricted)
- Succeeded by: Joe Donnelly

Personal details
- Born: Joseph Christopher Chocola; February 24, 1962 (age 64) Jackson, Michigan, U.S.
- Party: Republican
- Spouse: Sarah Chocola
- Education: Hillsdale College (BA); Western Michigan University (JD)

Joseph Christopher Chocola (born February 24, 1962) is an American businessman, lawyer, and former politician who served as the U.S. representative from Indiana's 2nd congressional district from 2003 to 2007.

In 2002, Chocola ran for the U.S. House, defeating former Democratic congresswoman Jill Long Thompson. Chocola was a member of the Agriculture, Small Business, Transportation and Infrastructure, and Ways and Means committees. In 2004, he defeated lawyer and then-Mishawaka Marian School Board President Joe Donnelly, later losing in a rematch against Donnelly in 2006.

After leaving Congress, Chocola served as president of the Club for Growth, a fiscally conservative 501(c)4 organization, from 2009 through the end of 2014.

== Early life, education, and career ==
Chocola was born in Jackson, Michigan. He grew up in Michigan, graduating from Williamston High School in 1980. He graduated in 1984 from Hillsdale College, in Hillsdale, Michigan, with a double major in business administration and political economy. While at Hillsdale College he joined the Alpha Tau Omega fraternity. After graduation, he went to work at Society National Bank, now known as KeyBank, which had recruited him into its management program in Cleveland. At the time when he left to go to law school, he was employed as a foreign exchange trader for the bank.

Chocola attended law school classes at night at Western Michigan University Cooley Law School, in Lansing, Michigan, while working as a credit manager for his family's business, Chocola Cleaning Materials. He graduated in 1988.

In 1988, Chocola was hired as corporate counsel by CTB International in Milford, Indiana, a manufacturer of products for the poultry, egg, swine, and grain production industries, which his grandfather, Howard Brembeck, had founded. He initially managed all the legal aspects of the business as corporate counsel. He then held various management positions until he was named CEO in 1994. In April 1999, he left the CEO position to become chairman of the board.

In August 2002, CTB International was sold to Berkshire Hathaway, the investment firm of billionaire Warren Buffett. The Chocola family received 55% of the $140 million paid to shareholders of the company.

== Congressional elections ==
=== 2000 ===
In the 2000 election, Chocola made an unsuccessful bid for Congress in what was then Indiana's 3rd congressional district, losing to incumbent Democrat Timothy J. Roemer by a 52–47% margin. In that campaign, Chocola spent more than $1 million, including $465,000 of his own money.

In the October 8, 2000, edition of the Elkhart Truth, an Elkhart, Indiana newspaper, Chocola was quoted as saying that "Bush's plan of individual investment of 2 percent of the money is a start. Eventually, I'd like to see the entire Social Security system privatized. It's not a 'risky scheme'." In late October, after Roemer had featured that statement in political ads, Chocola said, "There is no one proposing, including me, a plan of total privatization." The newspaper, saying Chocola had made his statement in meeting its editorial board, refused to retract the story. Roemer refused to stop running the ad despite Chocola's contention that the quotation was taken out of context.

=== 2002 ===
Roemer retired after his 2001–2003 term. In 2002, Chocola ran again for the open seat, which had been renumbered as the 2nd District after redistricting. In November, he defeated former Congresswoman Jill Long Thompson by a 51–46 margin with 188,446 votes cast, in a race that included campaign appearances by President Bush, Vice President Dick Cheney, and other top Republicans, to assist his bid.

=== 2004 ===
In 2004, Chocola defeated Democrat Joe Donnelly by a 54–45% margin with 259,355 votes cast, in an election where Bush received 56 percent of the district's vote. In that race, Chocola outspent Donnelly $1.4 million to $700,000. Chocola was assisted by a fundraising visit from Vice President Dick Cheney during the campaign.

=== 2006 ===
Chocola defeated Tony Zirkle, an attorney, Navy veteran, and frequent candidate, in the Republican primary on May 2, 2006, by 70% to 30%. In the November general election, Chocola lost to Democratic candidate Joe Donnelly, whom he had defeated in 2004, by a 54–46% margin with 191,861 votes cast.

== House of Representatives (2003–2007) ==
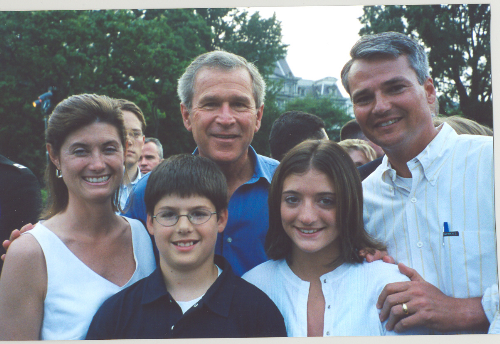
The Chocola Family with President George W. Bush

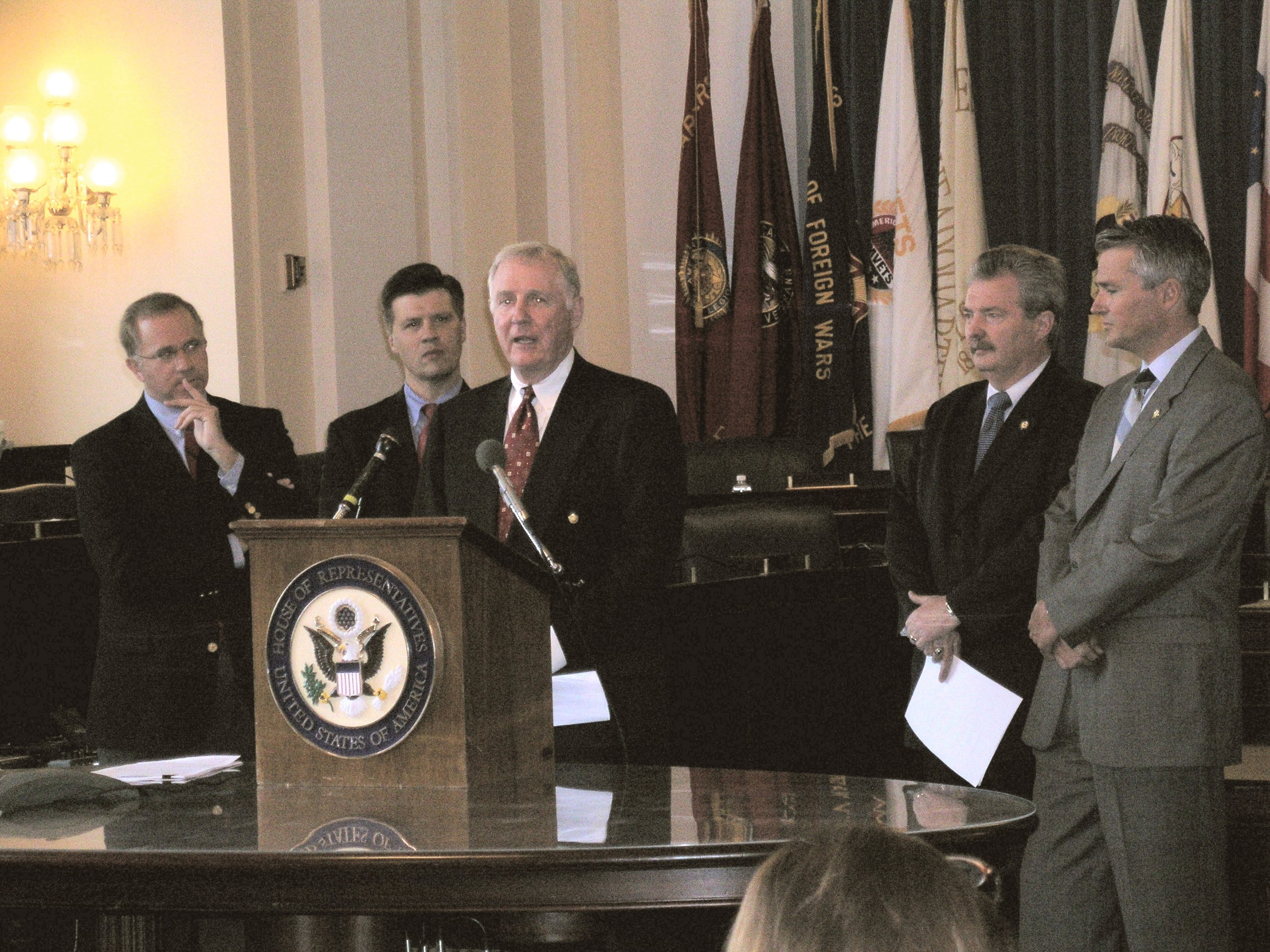
Chocola at a joint press conference with Dan Burton, Steve Buyer, Mike Sodrel, and John Hostettler in 2005

According to a profile by the Associated Press, "Chocola is a strong supporter of President Bush". The two do differ on some positions, such as illegal immigration. Chocola has supported (against the President's position) the "tough enforcement first" House version of changes in immigration law, in opposition to the President's calls for a guest worker program.

In January 2006, Chocola said that great strides were being made in transitioning Iraq from military coalition to police control. He said it was too early to predict when the job will be done.

=== Social issues ===
- Chocola was a cosponsor of the Federal Marriage Amendment in 2003 and voted for that Amendment when it came to the floor in 2004. He again was a cosponsor of the Marriage Protection Amendment in 2006 (H.J. Res. 88) and voted for the amendment on July 18, 2006.
- He voted in 2005 for an amendment to the Constitution preventing the desecration of the American flag.
- Voted for the Unlawful Internet Gambling Enforcement Act in July 2006, which restricts credit card companies from processing payment towards Internet gambling companies.
- Voted for the Pledge Protection Act in mid-July 2006, which would prevent federal courts from ruling on cases involving the Pledge of Allegiance.
- Voted against overriding President George W. Bush's veto of the Stem Cell Research Enhancement Act in July 2006. The bill would have modified restrictions on embryonic stem cell research and allowed for federal funding of the research.

=== Fiscal and economic issues ===
- Introduced a bill that would place currency manipulation tariffs on China. He later denounced this bill when he became president of the Club for Growth.
- Voted against increasing the Low Income Home Energy Assistance Program by $1 billion in March 2006.
- Voted for the Tax Relief Extension Reconciliation Act in May 2006, which extended tax cuts set to expire over the next seven (7) years.
- Voted for the Permanent Estate Tax Relief Act in June 2006. The bill permanently exempted personal estates of less than $5 million per spouse from estate taxes, and lowered the tax rate on larger estates.
- In the summer of 2006, voted for a bill that would allow private companies to drill for oil in ANWR.
- One of two cosponsors of HELPS Retirees Act (H.R. 2177), also known as the Healthcare Enhancement for Local Public Safety Retirees Act of 2005, which enables retired public safety officers to designate up to $5,000 per year from governmental pension or deferred compensation funds for health care premiums on a pre-tax basis. This earned Chocola an endorsement from the International Association of Fire Fighters, one of his only endorsements from organized labor.

U.S. House of Representatives
Preceded by Tim Roemer	Member of the U.S. House of Representatives from Indiana's 2nd congressional district 2003–2007	Succeeded by Joe Donnelly
Non-profit organization positions
Preceded by Pat Toomey	President of the Club for Growth; 2009–2014	Succeeded by David M. McIntosh
U.S. order of precedence (ceremonial)
Preceded by Edward A. Pease as Former U.S. Representative	Order of precedence of the United States as Former U.S. Representative	Succeeded by Brad Ellsworth as Former U.S. Representative
