= Richard Mourdock =

American politician

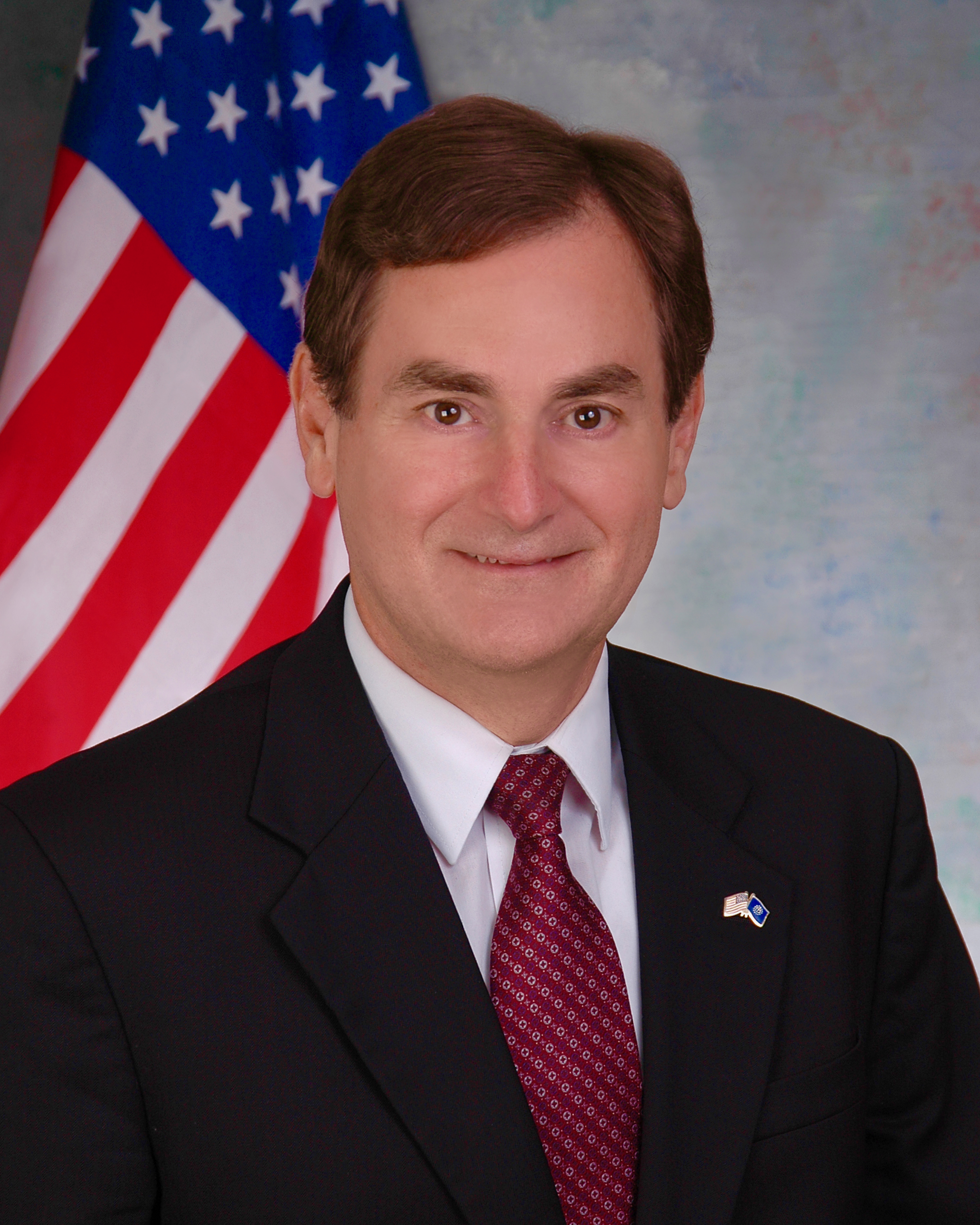
- Official portrait, c. 2007–2012

53rd Treasurer of Indiana
- In office February 10, 2007 – August 29, 2014
- Governor: Mitch Daniels; Mike Pence
- Preceded by: Tim Berry
- Succeeded by: Kelly Mitchell

Personal details
- Born: Richard Earl Mourdock; October 8, 1951 (age 75) Wauseon, Ohio, U.S.
- Party: Republican
- Spouse: Marilyn Mourdock
- Education: Defiance College (BS); Ball State University (MS)

Richard Earl Mourdock (born October 8, 1951) is an American politician who served as treasurer of the state of Indiana from 2007 to 2014. Running with the support of the Tea Party movement, he defeated six-term incumbent U.S. Senator Richard Lugar in the May 2012 Republican primary election for U.S. Senate. He lost the November 6, 2012, general election for Lugar's seat to Democratic congressman Joe Donnelly.

== Early life, family and education ==
Mourdock was born in Wauseon, Ohio, the son of Dolores Elaine (Bobel) and David Lee Mourdock. He was raised in Bucyrus, Ohio. His father worked as an Ohio State Highway Patrol trooper.

Mourdock graduated from Wynford High School in Bucyrus in 1969, earned a Bachelor of Science in natural systems from Defiance College in 1973 and a Master of Arts in geology from Ball State University in 1975.

== Career ==
Mourdock was a field geologist with AMAX Coal Company. He was a Surface Mine Geology Project Coordinator when he left the company in 1979. From 1979 to 1984, Mourdock was employed by Standard Oil of Ohio as a senior geologist and ultimately became chief geologist for the company. In 1984, Mourdock accepted a position with Koester Companies in Evansville, Indiana. For sixteen years, Mourdock served as vice president of the company's coal subsidiary and eventually became vice president of business development for the parent company. In addition, Mourdock served as a trustee for the company's employee stock ownership plan (ESOP). After leaving Koester, Mourdock founded and ran his own environmental consulting business, R. E. Mourdock & Associates.

== Early political career (1988–2002) ==
Mourdock ran in 1988, 1990 and 1992 for the U.S. House of Representatives, seeking to represent Indiana's 8th congressional district. In 1988, he was defeated in the Republican primary. In 1990 and 1992, he won the Republican nomination but was defeated by Democrat Frank McCloskey in the general election, 55–45% and 53–45%, respectively.

From 1995 to 2002, Mourdock served two terms as an elected member of Vanderburgh County Board of Commissioners, the county's executive governing body. In 2002, Mourdock sought the Republican nomination for Indiana Secretary of State—a position chosen at the party's convention. In the three-way contest, Mourdock and fellow conservative Mike Delph split the conservative vote, with the result that the more moderate Todd Rokita won the nomination In 2004, Mourdock unsuccessfully sought a seat on the Vanderburgh County Council.

== State Treasurer (2007–2014) ==
In 2006, he ran for Indiana treasurer, winning most of the counties in the northern portion of the state, and defeating Michael W. Griffin, 52%–48%. Mourdock began his first four-year term in February 2007. In 2009, in his role as state treasurer, he sued to stop the federal bailout of Chrysler, contending that the bailout plan violated U.S. bankruptcy law by giving more funds to unsecured creditors than it did secured creditors including three Indiana pension funds. Though the suit was unsuccessful, it helped Mourdock gain national recognition.

Mourdock was re-elected in November 2010 against naval officer Pete Buttigieg, 62%–38%, receiving more than 1,000,000 votes.

Mourdock resigned from his position as treasurer on August 29, 2014, effective immediately. Governor Mike Pence appointed chief financial officer and chief operating officer of the Indiana Finance Authority Daniel Huge to serve as interim treasurer. Mourdock's resignation came on the last day that state employees could retire before cuts to pension benefits took effect in September 2014.

== 2012 U.S. Senate election ==
On February 22, 2011, Mourdock announced he would challenge incumbent U.S. Senator Richard Lugar in the 2012 Republican primary. At the announcement, Mourdock criticized Lugar for his support of the auto bailouts, his votes in favor of the DREAM Act and the START treaty and his opposition to earmark reform. He said Indiana needed a senator who would return home to hold town halls, and not "a globe-trotting Senator", like Lugar. Mourdock later criticized Lugar's record on bipartisanship, his authorship of the 1991 Nunn-Lugar Act to secure and dismantle weapons of mass destruction in the former Soviet Union, and the 2006 expansion of the legislation to cover conventional weapons stockpiles and secure loose nukes. He called Lugar "President Obama's favorite Republican", referring to an October 2008 MSNBC article titled, "Barack Obama's favorite Republican?", which had described Lugar as a "loyal Republican" while reporting on a 10-day international trip Lugar and then-Senator Obama had taken in 2005 to inspect weapons sites.

At the time he announced his candidacy, Mourdock released a list of 12 Republican state central committee members and 67 GOP county chairs who endorsed him; he soon began gathering tea party support as well. He spoke at over two dozen local tea party gatherings across Indiana where he gained name recognition and support. At a 2011 local tea party convention in Greenfield, Indiana, Mourdock received 96 of the 97 straw poll votes cast. In the week before the primary, political action groups such as FreedomWorks, the NRA, National Right to Life, and 45 local tea party groups held a get-out-the-vote rally for Mourdock that was attended by 500 tea party members along with Reverend C.L. Bryant and FOX News political commentator Michelle Malkin. Mourdock addressed the rally praising the support he had been given by FreedomWorks and similar groups, and adding that the tea party movement was very much alive "showing up to work for campaigns."

During the primary campaign, tea party-backed organizations such as Liberty News Network and America ReFocused campaigned door to door, sent out mailers and helped sponsor TV and radio ads. Mourdock's largest contributor was the Club for Growth which accounted for 40% of all outside spending, contributing $2.2 million. According to campaign finance records, some of Mourdock's other top donors and the respective amounts they have contributed are the NRA, $491,000; Citizens United Political Victory Fund, $96,300; and FreedomWorks for America, $437,184.

On May 8, 2012, Mourdock defeated Lugar in the primary, capturing just over 60% of the vote. Mourdock's victory was attributed in part to voter dissatisfaction with Lugar's moderate record as well as his absence from Indiana; he had not had a residence in the state since 1977. During his concession speech, Lugar criticized Mourdock for having an "unrelenting partisan mindset" and predicted he would be an ineffective legislator; Mourdock, in turn, praised Lugar's record of public service. Indiana political analyst Brian Howey ascribed Mourdock's primary win to Republican voters' belief that Lugar was too old and that he had been in Congress too long. Howey also said that "Just 15% ... voted for Mourdock because of his Tea Party ideology."

Mourdock faced Democratic nominee Joe Donnelly and Libertarian nominee Andy Horning in the general election. Mourdock said that if elected to the Senate, he would limit himself to two terms.

Mourdock had been endorsed by several conservative interest groups, including the Americans for Prosperity, Club for Growth, FreedomWorks, Citizens United, and the Tea Party Express, the NRA Political Victory Fund (NRA-PVF), and Indiana Right to Life. During the general election campaign, millions of dollars were spent by outside groups supporting Mourdock and his opponent, Donnelly. Only three other U.S. Senate races reportedly attracted more outside money.

Although Indiana had usually been a Republican stronghold, Mourdock lost the general election to Democratic nominee Joe Donnelly after the media attention over his comment in a debate that "life is that gift from God that I think even when life begins in that horrible situation of rape, that it is something that God intended to happen."

== Political positions ==
=== Social Security and Medicare ===
Mourdock has questioned the constitutionality of Social Security, Medicare, and Medicaid, saying to a group of supporters: "I challenge you in Article I, Section 8 of the United States Constitution where those so-called enumerated powers are listed. I challenge you to find words that talk about Medicare or Medicaid or, yes, even Social Security." Mourdock did not support cutting benefits for current Medicare beneficiaries, but he did support a new voucher plan for those under age 55. Mourdock also believed the age of eligibility for Medicare should be increased from 65 to 67. Mourdock believed Social Security should be reformed to allow younger workers to invest in personalized retirement accounts. He also believed that it will be necessary to increase the retirement age to collect Social Security benefits.

=== Abortion ===
As a candidate for Congress in 1992, Mourdock supported legal abortion in the case of some "crisis pregnancies", but did not believe abortion should be used as a form of birth control. During his 2012 US Senate race, he reiterated that he opposes abortion except to save the life of the mother. At an October 23, 2012, candidate debate, Mourdock explained why he is opposed to abortion even when the pregnancy is the result of rape:

I, too, certainly stand for life. I know there are some who disagree, and I respect their point of view. But I believe that life begins at conception. The only exception I have, to have an abortion, is in that case of the life of the mother. I've struggled with it myself for a long time, but I came to realize that life is that gift from God. And even when life begins in that horrible situation of rape, that it is something that God intended to happen."

Dan Parker, chairman of the Indiana Democratic Party, immediately attacked Mourdock, saying that, "I'm stunned and ashamed that Richard Mourdock believes God intended rape", and that he is an "extremist" who is out of touch with Indiana. Speculation that Mourdock's remark could affect the outcome of the Senate race centered on attempts to liken his comments to those of Todd Akin.

Responding to Parker, Mourdock issued a statement: "God creates life, and that was my point. God does not want rape, and by no means was I suggesting that he does. Rape is a horrible thing, and for anyone to twist my words otherwise is absurd and sick." He later added, "I believe God controls the universe. I don't believe biology works in an uncontrolled fashion." A number of Republican officials and candidates, including Sen. John McCain, called for him to issue an apology, but Mourdock refused. He instead aired a television ad titled "Leadership" several days after the comments stating that Democrats and Democratic PACs were "mocking Richard Mourdock's religious faith and twisting his words(...) playing politics and distracting from the real issues". He lost to Donnelly by almost 6 percent in the general election.

=== Federal spending ===
Mourdock called for cuts in federal spending and for a balanced budget. On his website, Mourdock supported the Ryan Path to Prosperity Plan. However, Mourdock has also said that "'Ryan's overall budget proposal might not go far enough, fast enough"; Mourdock would have liked to shrink government spending by $7.6 trillion in 10 years, as opposed to Ryan's budget which would cut $5.5 trillion. Mourdock said he would not have supported the Troubled Assets Relief Program and opposed the bailout of GM and Chrysler, which included measures causing losses to secured bondholders in retirement funds that he managed as treasurer. He pledged to abolish earmarks.

=== Immigration ===
Mourdock has opposed amnesty for illegal immigrants and the DREAM Act.

=== Views on bipartisanship ===
In February 2012, Mourdock told the Conservative Political Action Conference (CPAC) that bipartisanship has nearly bankrupted the country, and that confrontation, not collegiality, was needed. In an interview on MSNBC in May 2012, Mourdock said, "bipartisanship ought to consist of Democrats coming to the Republican point of view...If we win the House, Senate, and White House, bipartisanship means they have to come our way". In the same interview he said, "To me, the highlight of politics, frankly, is to inflict my opinion on someone else." Republican 2012 vice presidential nominee Paul Ryan later expressed his disagreement with Mourdock's statement, saying, "I obviously don't agree with that."

== Personal life ==
Mourdock is a longtime active member of the non-denominational evangelical Christian Fellowship Church in Evansville and made a number of Christian missionary trips through his church to Bolivia. He resides in Darmstadt, Indiana, a small town near Evansville, with his wife Marilyn.

== Electoral history ==
United States Representative – Indiana's 8th District, 1990
Party	Candidate	Votes	%
Democratic	Frank McCloskey (Incumbent)	97,465	54.7
Republican	Richard Mourdock	80,645	45.3

United States Representative – Indiana's 8th District, 1992
Party	Candidate	Votes	%
Democratic	Frank McCloskey (Incumbent)	125,244	53.0
Republican	Richard Mourdock	108,054	45.7

Treasurer of State (Indiana), 2006
Party	Candidate	Votes	%
Republican	Richard Mourdock	833,531	51.9
Democratic	Michael Griffin	771,610	48.0

Treasurer of State (Indiana), 2010
Party	Candidate	Votes	%
Republican	Richard Mourdock (Incumbent)	1,053,527	62.4
Democratic	Pete Buttigieg	633,243	37.5

U.S. Senate Republican primary, 2012
Party	Candidate	Votes	%
Republican	Richard Mourdock	403,268	60.6
Republican	Richard Lugar (Incumbent)	262,388	39.4

United States Senate election in Indiana, 2012
Party	Candidate	Votes	%	±%
Democratic	Joe Donnelly	1,281,181	50.04%	+50.04%
Republican	Richard Mourdock	1,133,621	44.28%	−43.08%
Libertarian	Andy Horning	145,282	5.67%	−6.92%
No party	Write-Ins	18	0 %	n/a
Majority		147,560	5.76%	−69.49%
Turnout		2,560,102	57.46%	+26.24%
Democratic gain from Republican		Swing		

Political offices
Preceded by Tim Berry	Treasurer of Indiana; 2007–2014	Succeeded by Daniel Huge
Party political offices
Preceded by Tim Berry	Republican nominee for Indiana State Treasurer; 2006, 2010	Succeeded by Kelly Mitchell
Preceded by Richard Lugar	Republican nominee for U.S. Senator from Indiana (Class 1); 2012	Succeeded by Mike Braun
