= Scott Wheeler (reporter) =

Scott L. Wheeler is an investigative journalist, political, and national security consultant. He founded the National Republican Trust Political Action Committee and cut ties with the PAC in 2020.

== Background ==
Wheeler was born in Atlanta, Georgia in February 1963. His family later moved to Des Moines, Iowa, where he finished high school. Following high school, Wheeler served in the U.S. Army for two years, later returning to the Army National Guard and immediately volunteering for active duty service in 2005 and 2006. As a student, Wheeler played college football at Iowa Central Community College (Fort Dodge, Iowa) and Emporia State University (Emporia, Kansas). After returning from Army duty, Wheeler was a high school head football coach for one year, 2007.

While attending Emporia State University, Wheeler started a competing newspaper (Emporia Press Review) to the campus newspaper at Emporia State which received attention citywide and in a short time became a competitor to the city newspaper the Emporia Gazette.

Upon leaving Emporia State, Wheeler hosted a nationwide radio show, Reporter’s Journal. He then helped to create and develop the Washington, DC–based investigative television series, American Investigator Television Newsmagazine. Wheeler became a correspondent with the show and ultimately chief correspondent for the series that aired on NET (America's Voice) and later syndicated.

== Investigations and political advocacy ==
Wheeler has worked undercover to reveal the internal operations of Hamas within the United States, leading to several suspects named in the reports to be arrested. Wheeler also exposed a weapons-of-mass-destruction pipeline run out of the Middle East, posing as an undercover arms dealer during his investigation in 1998 and 1999. Wearing video and audio equipment, Wheeler recorded the suspects and tracked the arms procurement network back to Libya and reported on Libya's WMD program before it was known to US intelligence agencies.

During the Clinton Administration, Wheeler traveled to Asia and investigated the 1996 United States campaign finance controversy. Many of his reports during this period were used in criminal prosecutions, congressional investigations and hearings, and were recognized by members of Congress as the catalysts for their investigations. Wheeler produced the documentary Trading with the Enemy: How the Clinton Administration Armed China that claimed that President Clinton had decontrolled dangerous military technology to The People's Republic of China while receiving illegal donations from operatives from PRC. In 2003, Wheeler's reportage led to the exposure of a foreign agent from China operating inside the U.S. posing as a college student.

In 2009, Wheeler co-authored, along with Dr. Peter Leitner, the book Shadow Government: What Obama Doesn't Want You To Know About His Czars. The book's content was used in long-form campaign advertisements run by the National Republican Trust PAC right before the 2010 election.

In 2012 Wheeler wrote the book, Promoting Decline: Obama vs. America. Wheeler has been a frequent guest on Fox News Channel and Fox Business News.
