= Joe Donnelly =

American politician and diplomat (born 1955)

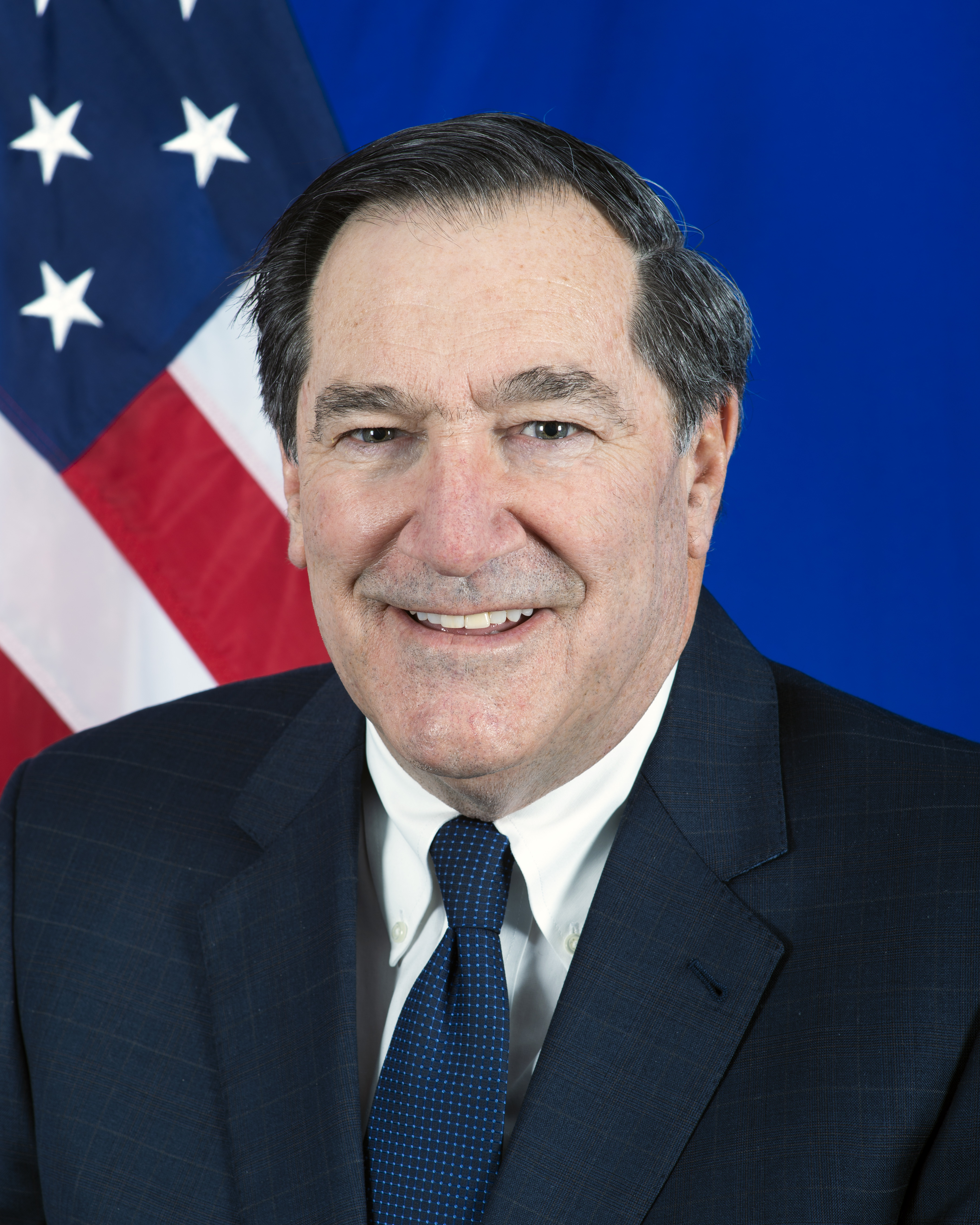
- Official portrait, 2022

12th United States Ambassador to the Holy See
- In office April 11, 2022 – July 8, 2024
- President: Joe Biden
- Preceded by: Callista Gingrich
- Succeeded by: Brian Burch

United States Senator from Indiana
- In office January 3, 2013 – January 3, 2019
- Preceded by: Richard Lugar
- Succeeded by: Mike Braun

Member of the U.S. House of Representatives from Indiana's 2nd district
- In office January 3, 2007 – January 3, 2013
- Preceded by: Chris Chocola
- Succeeded by: Jackie Walorski

Personal details
- Born: Joseph Simon Donnelly Sr. September 29, 1955 (age 71) Massapequa, New York, U.S.
- Party: Democratic
- Spouse: Jill Donnelly (m. 1979)
- Children: 2
- Education: University of Notre Dame (BA, JD)
- Donnelly's voice Donnelly honoring Vietnam War veterans from Indiana during its 40th anniversary. Recorded December 10, 2015

Joseph Simon Donnelly Sr. (born September 29, 1955) is an American attorney, politician, and diplomat who served in the U.S. House of Representatives from 2007 to 2013 and as a U.S. senator from 2013 to 2019. A member of the Democratic Party from Indiana, he would later serve as the United States ambassador to the Holy See from 2022 to 2024 under President Joe Biden.

Born in Massapequa, New York, Donnelly graduated from the University of Notre Dame. He began his political career on the Indiana State Election Board while working as an attorney in practice. From 1997 to 2001 he was on the Mishawaka Marian School Board, serving as its president from 2000 to 2001. In 2004, he won the Democratic nomination for a seat in the U.S. House of Representatives, losing to Republican incumbent Chris Chocola in the general election. In 2006, he challenged Chocola again, and won election with 54% of the vote. He represented Indiana's 2nd congressional district from 2007 to 2013, winning reelection in 2008 and 2010.

In May 2011, Donnelly announced his intention to run for the U.S. Senate, winning the Democratic nomination one year later in an uncontested primary. He then faced Indiana State Treasurer Richard Mourdock who had defeated 36-year incumbent Richard Lugar in the Republican primary. On November 6, 2012, Donnelly defeated Mourdock in the general election with 50% of the vote to Mourdock's 44%; Mourdock's loss was attributed by some to his controversial comments about sexual assault. In 2018, Donnelly ran for reelection to a second term, but he was defeated by former Republican state representative Mike Braun.

On October 8, 2021, President Joe Biden announced he would nominate Donnelly to serve as the United States ambassador to the Holy See. He presented his letters of credence to Pope Francis on April 11, 2022.

== Early life and education ==
Donnelly was born and raised in Massapequa, New York. His mother died when he was 10, and he was raised by his father. He graduated from the University of Notre Dame with a Bachelor of Arts in government in 1977, and earned his Juris Doctor from Notre Dame Law School in 1981.

== Early career ==
He practiced at the law firm Nemeth, Feeney and Masters until 1996, when he opened Marking Solutions, a printing and rubber-stamp company.

Donnelly served on the Indiana Election Commission from 1988 to 1989. He was a member of the Mishawaka Marian School Board from 1997 to 2001 and its president from 2000 to 2001.

He ran for Indiana attorney general in 1988, but lost at the Democratic state convention. He also ran an unsuccessful campaign for the Indiana Senate in 1990.

In 2004, Donnelly ran for the U.S. Congress from Indiana's 2nd congressional district. He won the Democratic nomination unopposed, but lost the election to incumbent Republican Chris Chocola, 54%–45%.

== U.S. House of Representatives (2007–2013) ==
=== Elections ===
==== 2006 ====
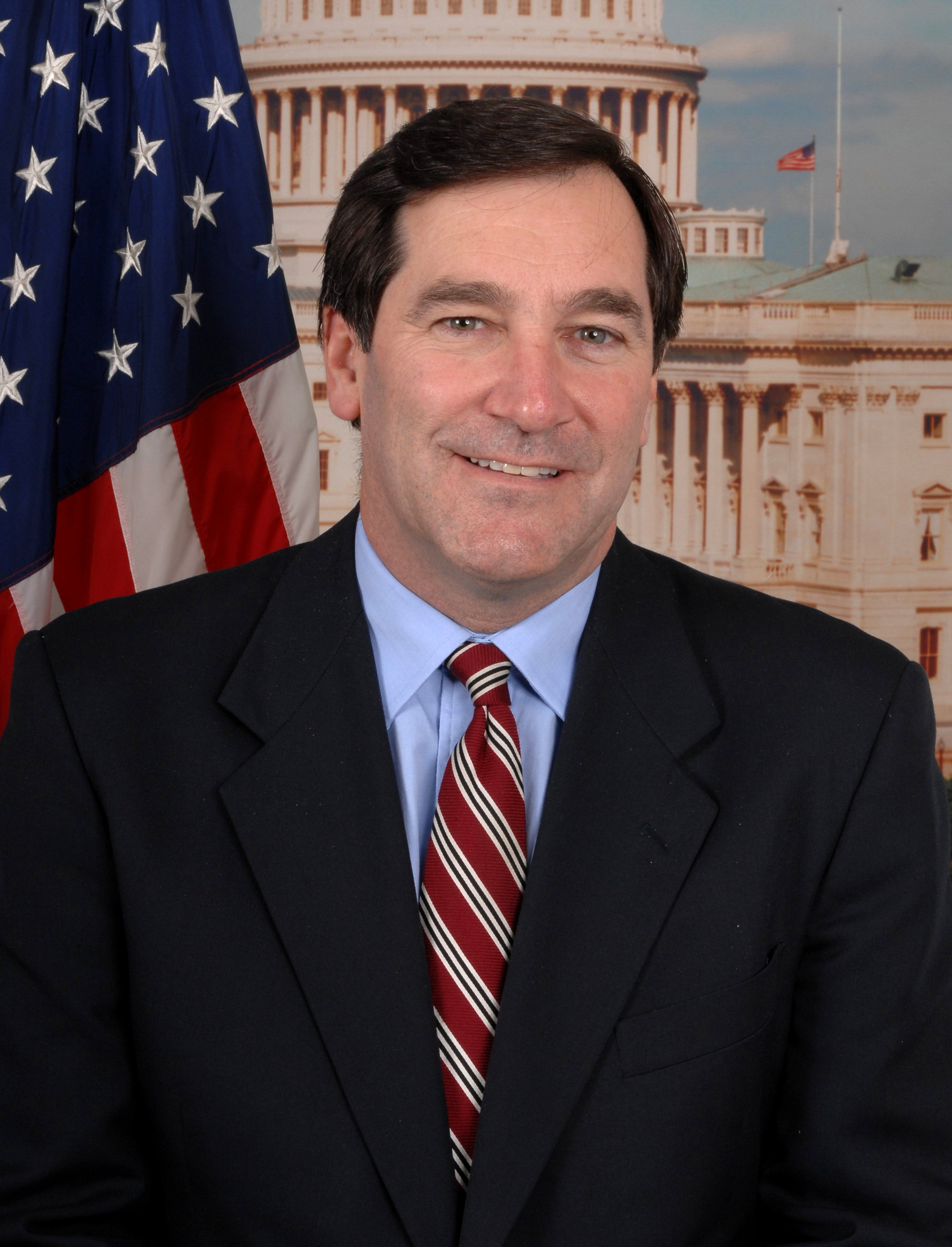
Official Portrait of Donnelly as a freshman in the U.S. House in the 110th Congress

On May 2, 2006, Donnelly defeated Steve Francis for the Democratic nomination for U.S. Congress from Indiana's 2nd district, setting up a rematch against incumbent Chris Chocola. Because of President George W. Bush's waning popularity, the race was expected to be competitive. The website MoveOn.org targeted Chocola and ran advertising against him. Chocola maintained a decisive lead in fundraising, raising $3.2 million to Donnelly's $1.5 million. The campaign was heated, with the Democratic Congressional Campaign Committee sponsoring ads attacking Chocola as beholden to moneyed interests in the insurance, pharmaceutical, and energy industries. Chocola returned fire by attacking Donnelly over a late tax filing and attempting to link him to Democratic House leader Nancy Pelosi.

On November 7, 2006, Donnelly defeated Chocola 54% to 46%, a difference of 15,145 votes. The key difference between the 2006 and 2004 elections lay in the results in St. Joseph County, the location of South Bend and by far the district's largest county. Donnelly won that county with 58% of the vote.

==== 2008 ====
Donnelly ran unopposed for the Democratic nomination. In the general election, he won reelection to a second term with 67% of the vote.

==== 2010 ====
Donnelly ran unopposed for the Democratic nomination. In the general election, he was challenged by Republican nominee State Representative Jackie Walorski. Despite the Republican wave in the 2010 midterm elections, Donnelly won reelection to a third term, defeating Walorski by 2,538 votes.

=== Committee assignments ===
Donnelly was named to the House Financial Services Committee for the 110th Congress.

- Committee on Financial Services
  - Subcommittee on Capital Markets, Insurance, and Government-Sponsored Enterprises
  - Subcommittee on International Monetary Policy and Trade
- Committee on Veterans' Affairs
  - Subcommittee on Health
  - Subcommittee on Oversight and Investigations (Ranking Member)

== U.S. Senate (2013–2019) ==
=== Elections ===
==== 2012 ====
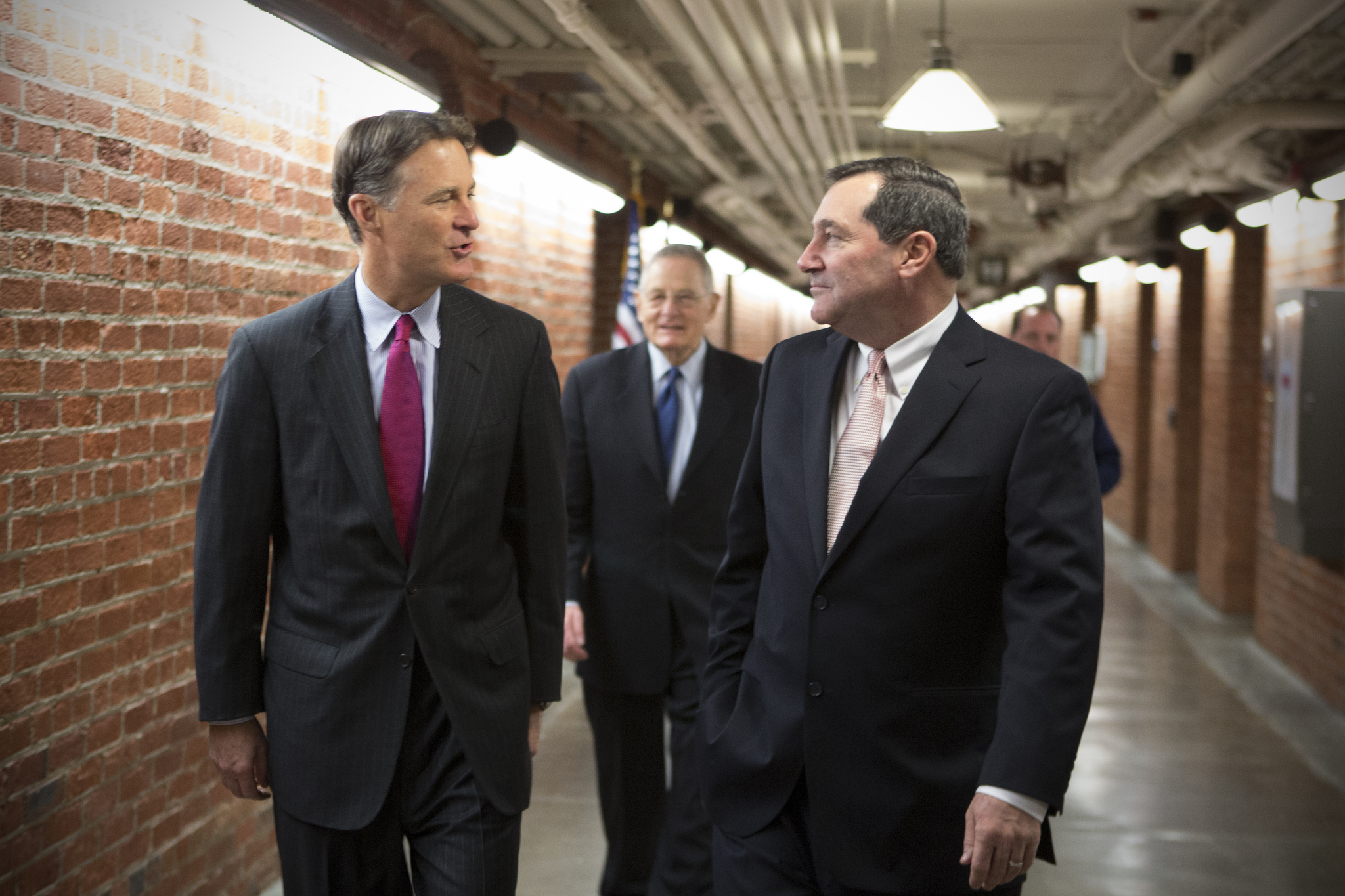
Senator Joe Donnelly, with former Senator Birch Bayh and his son, former Governor of Indiana and Senator Evan Bayh

On May 8, 2011, Donnelly ran unopposed for the Democratic nomination for the U.S. Senate after acknowledging the difficulty of winning reelection in his new home district drawn per the 2010 census. He faced a Tea Party favorite, Indiana State Treasurer Richard Mourdock, who had defeated six-term incumbent Richard Lugar in the Republican primary, and Libertarian nominee Andy Horning.

An issue in the campaign was the auto bailout of 2009, which Donnelly supported and Mourdock said was unconstitutional. Donnelly fashioned himself "a common-sense Hoosier" in the tradition of Richard Lugar and Evan Bayh.

Donnelly was endorsed by The Journal Gazette and the South Bend Tribune.

During the campaign, Mourdock became embroiled in a controversy after stating that pregnancy from rape is "something that God intended". His remarks were made in a debate on October 23, 2012, during which he explained his opposition to abortion even in the case of rape.

On November 6, 2012, Donnelly defeated Mourdock, 50% to 44%.

==== 2018 ====
Donnelly ran for reelection against Republican Mike Braun and Libertarian Lucy Brenton. Braun won the election. After the election, Donnelly stated that the debacle his fellow Democrats created during the confirmation hearings of Brett Kavanaugh's nomination to the U.S. Supreme Court was a contributing factor to his defeat.

=== Tenure ===
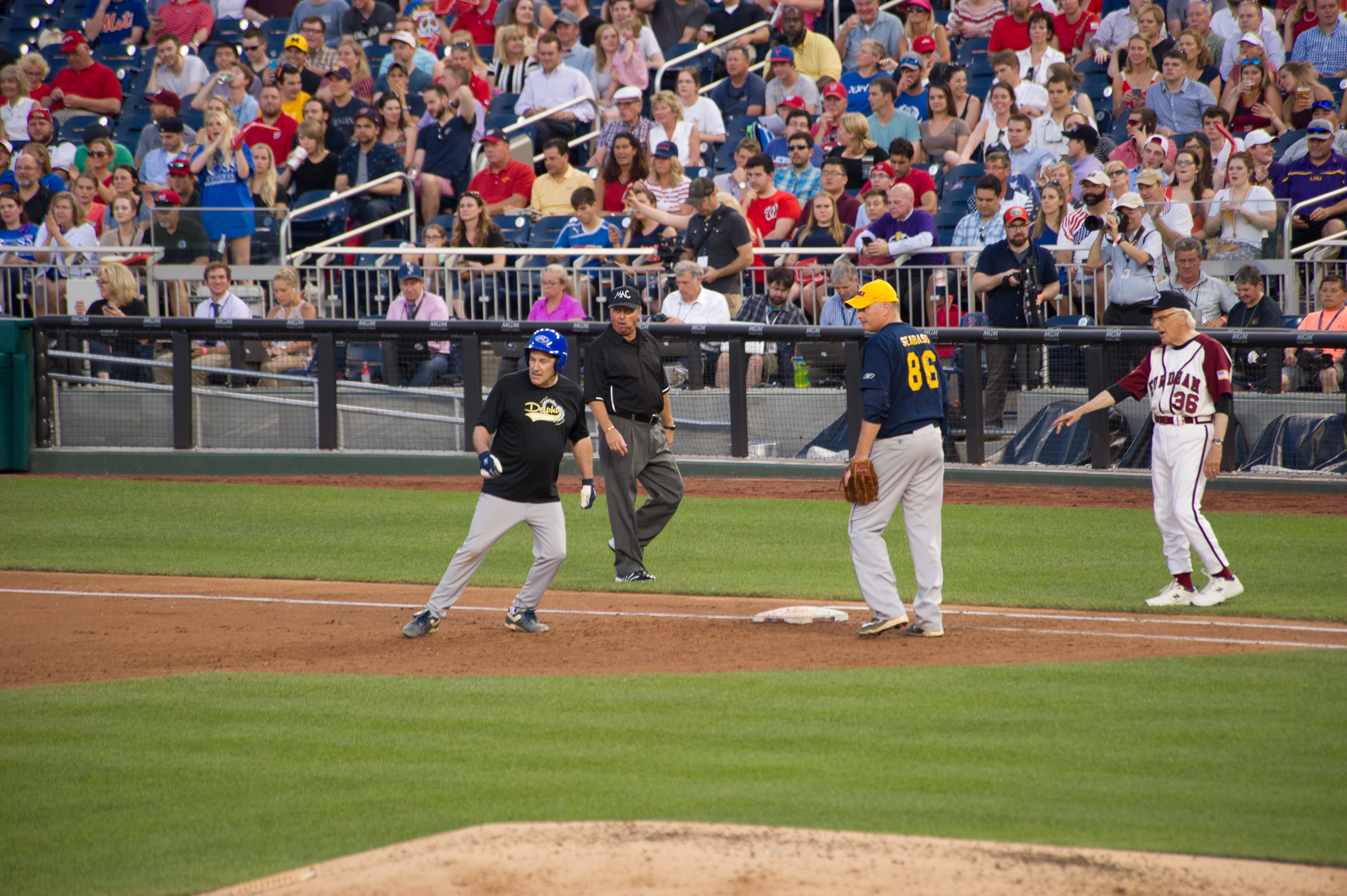
Donnelly playing at the 2017 Congressional Baseball Game.

On January 3, 2013, Donnelly was sworn into the United States Senate in the 113th Congress by Vice President Joe Biden. Donnelly was the first Democrat to hold his seat since Vance Hartke's defeat by Richard Lugar in 1977. The Lugar Center, a Washington, D.C.–based nonprofit Lugar founded in 2013, ranked Donnelly the fourth most bipartisan Senator in the first session of the 115th United States Congress as well as the most bipartisan Democrat in the Senate.

In July 2017, the Associated Press reported that despite Donnelly's vocal criticism of free-trade policies and outsourcing to Mexico, he had financial ties to a family business, Stewart Superior Corp., which utilized Mexican labor for its operations. Donnelly, who previously owned company stock and served as a corporate officer and general counsel, faced criticism from trade experts for what they perceived as hypocrisy in light of his opposition to NAFTA. After the AP report, Donnelly agreed to sell his stock in the family firm. In August 2017, the NRSC hired a mariachi band to play at a campaign stop as a way of reminding voters about the issue of exporting jobs to Mexico in relation to this accusation.

=== Committee assignments ===
- Committee on Agriculture, Nutrition and Forestry
  - Subcommittee on Commodities, Markets, Trade and Risk Management (Ranking Member)
  - Subcommittee on Jobs, Rural Economic Growth and Energy Innovation
  - Subcommittee on Livestock, Dairy, Poultry, Marketing and Agriculture Security
- Committee on Armed Services
  - Subcommittee on Airland
  - Subcommittee on Emerging Threats and Capabilities
  - Subcommittee on Strategic Forces (Ranking Member)
- Committee on Banking, Housing, and Urban Affairs
  - Subcommittee on Housing, Transportation, and Community Development
  - Subcommittee on Financial Institutions and Consumer Protection
  - Subcommittee on Securities, Insurance, and Investment
- Special Committee on Aging

== Political positions ==
Donnelly was considered a moderate Democrat who "sometimes bucks his party on issues such as abortion, defense spending and the environment". According to Politico, "Donnelly is constantly dogged by Republicans aiming to unseat him" while also facing "disgruntled Democrats who think he's far too conservative". In 2013, the National Journal gave Donnelly a composite score of 52% conservative and 48% liberal. According to FiveThirtyEight, which tracks Congressional votes, Donnelly voted with President Trump's position 54.5% of the time. Congressional Quarterly published a study finding that Donnelly voted with Trump's positions 62% of the time. According to GovTrack, Donnelly was the second most conservative Democrat, after Joe Manchin, and to the right of moderate Republican Senator Susan Collins. He supported progressive taxation and organized labor, but opposed same-sex marriage and abortion, even in the case of rape, during his 2012 campaign (though he supported an exception in the case of rape in the 2018 campaign). On April 5, 2013, Donnelly endorsed same-sex marriage on his Facebook page.

=== Economic policy ===
==== Taxes ====
In February 2009, Donnelly voted for the American Recovery and Reinvestment Act.

Donnelly voted against the Temporary Payroll Tax Cut Continuation Act of 2011 (a two-month extension of an expiring provision from the American Recovery Act, forestalling an increase in the payroll tax from 4.2% to 6.2%); he voted for the Middle Class Tax Relief and Job Creation Act of 2012 (a one-year extension of the same provision). In 2012 Donnelly also voted for H.R. 9, the Small Business Tax Cut Act, which would allow businesses with fewer than 500 employees to receive a tax deduction equal to 20% of their domestic business income.

Donnelly was one of 276 Congress members who voted for the Tax Relief, Unemployment Insurance Reauthorization, and Job Creation Act of 2010, extending the Bush tax cuts and a 13-month extension of unemployment benefits. In an interview, Donnelly said that he favored making the tax cuts permanent for middle-class Americans and temporarily extending the cuts for families making at least $250,000. In a speech at the 2012 Indiana Democratic Convention, Donnelly said that he would support a temporary one-year extension of all Bush-era tax cuts. "Given our continued economic challenges," he said, "now is the time to keep tax rates low.... We need to create jobs, we need to help the middle class and support small businesses, and we need to avoid partisan bickering and delay."

On September 27, 2013, Donnelly voted for the Continuing Appropriations Resolution, 2014 (H.J.Res 59).

In 2016, Donnelly received a rating of 10% from FreedomWorks and 15% from Club for Growth; in 2015–16, the National Tax Limitation Committee gave him a 36% rating.

Donnelly opposed the Republican tax reform legislation, the Tax Cuts and Jobs Act of 2017, saying in October 2017 that he was open to supporting the plan but wanted to see more detail and be assured it would focus on substantial middle-class tax relief.

==== Financial regulation ====
During his second term, Donnelly voted for the Dodd–Frank Wall Street Reform and Consumer Protection Act.

A March 2012 letter signed by Donnelly and other Democratic members of the House and Senate, urged Commodity Futures Trading Commission Chairman Gary Gensler to curb oil speculation in the commodity market through new provisions in the Wall Street Reform and Consumer Protection Act.

In July 2012, Donnelly voted in favor of H.R. 459, the Federal Reserve Transparency Act, sponsored by Texas Congressman Ron Paul. The bill requires a full audit of the Federal Reserve, the Federal Reserve Board of Governors, and Federal reserve banks by the Comptroller General. He also joined Republicans in writing a bill to deregulate certain banks. He was one of four Democrats who helped write the bill. In 2018, Donnelly broke with the majority of his party and voted with Republicans to loosen banking regulations.

==== Labor issues ====
In 2007, Donnelly co-sponsored the Fair Minimum Wage Act of 2007. The act allowed Congress to gradually raise the federal minimum wage from $5.15 per hour to $7.25 per hour. Donnelly voted in favor of the Lilly Ledbetter Fair Pay Act. Donnelly has pushed for the passage of the "Forty Hours is Full Time Act" along with Republican senator Susan Collins, which would define a full-time employment as 40 hours a week rather than 30.

=== Health care ===
Donnelly, along with 197 members of the House, was a cosponsor of the Medicare Prescription Drug Price Negotiation Act of 2007. He voted against the Prescription Drug Imports Act, which would have "allowed funds to be used to prohibit the importation of prescription drugs by anyone who is not a legally sanctioned importer of drugs, a wholesaler, or a pharmacist".

In 2007, Donnelly was a co-sponsor of the Children's Health Insurance Program Reauthorization Act (CHIP), which would have added $35 billion and 4 million children to the program over five years by raising the federal cigarette tax by 61 cents to $1 per pack. After passing the House and Senate, the measure was vetoed by President George W. Bush. Donnelly joined 217 Democrats and 42 Republicans in a failed effort to override Bush's veto.

In March 2010, Donnelly voted for the Patient Protection and Affordable Care Act (commonly called Obamacare or the Affordable Care Act). In 2013, Donnelly proposed changing the Affordable Care Act's definition of full-time work from 30 hours a week to 40. He also supported repealing the medical device excise tax, a 2.3% tax on the sale of certain medical devices by the manufacturer, producer or importer of the device. In 2012, Donnelly cosponsored the Protect Medical Innovation Act, which would repeal the tax.

After Donnelly voted in 2012 to repeal the medical-device tax that is part of Obamacare, his 2012 election opponent, Richard Mourdock, said: "Joe Donnelly wants to pick apart Obamacare, but that begs the question: Why didn't he just hold out and not vote for it?"

In 2017 campaign messages, Donnelly called President Donald Trump's proposed changes to Obamacare "unacceptable and cruel" and "half-baked", asserting that Obamacare "benefits millions of Hoosiers". In January 2018, Donnelly was one of six Democrats to join Republican senators in voting to confirm Alex Azar, Trump's nominee for Health Secretary.

=== Education ===
Donnelly opposed Trump's nomination of Betsy DeVos as Secretary of Education. "After reviewing her record," he explained, "I share the concerns expressed by many Hoosier educators, students, and families that Betsy DeVos lacks the commitment to public education needed to effectively lead the Department of Education."

=== Foreign policy ===
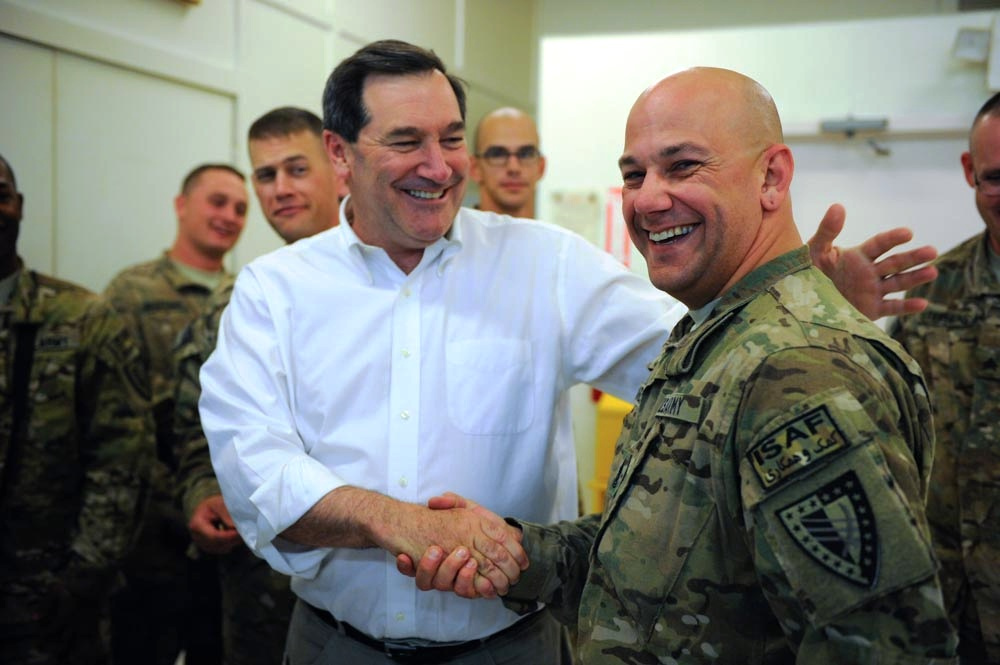
Donnelly with U.S. service members of the International Security Assistance Force in Afghanistan

==== Libya ====
In 2011, Donnelly voted to allow Department of Defense funds to be used for military actions as part of the NATO Intervention in Libya. He also voted in support of the failed resolution to authorize the President to continue the limited use of U.S. Forces in Libya. The resolution stated that Congress does not support deploying, establishing, or maintaining the presence of units and members of U.S. Armed Forces on the ground in Libya unless the purpose of the presence is limited to the defense of U.S. government officials or NATO member forces from imminent danger.

==== Iraq ====
Donnelly voted against the Iraq War troop surge of 2007. In July 2007, he joined 221 other House members in voting for HR 2956, the Responsible Redeployment from Iraq Act. This legislation contained a deadline for withdrawal of U.S. forces from Iraq.

==== Afghanistan ====
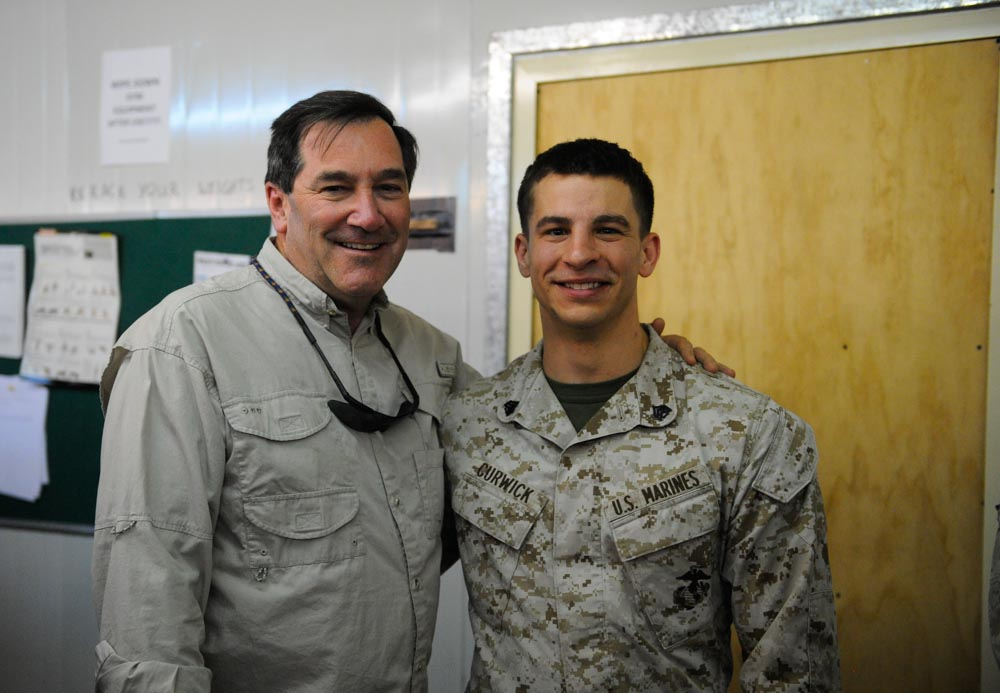
Donnelly with service member of the United States Marine Corps

In 2011, Donnelly aligned himself with Republicans and seven other members of the Blue Dog Coalition in a 204–215 House vote against an accelerated withdrawal from the war in Afghanistan. He reaffirmed opposition to an accelerated withdrawal from Afghanistan in voting against the Lee amendment, proposed in H.R. 4310, the National Defense Authorization Act for Fiscal Year 2013. The Lee amendment would have prohibited the military spending any money in Afghanistan except for non-combat humanitarian activities, and on activities leading to the withdrawal of American military forces from the country.

==== Israel ====
Donnelly supported a Senate resolution condemning the UN Security Council resolution on Israeli settlements built on the occupied Palestinian territories in the West Bank.

In May 2017, Donnelly co-sponsored the Israel Anti-Boycott Act (s. 720), which would have made it a federal crime for Americans to encourage or participate in boycotts against Israel and Israeli settlements in the occupied Palestinian territories if protesting actions by the Israeli government.

=== National security ===
In 2011, Donnelly voted against H.R. 2219, which would have cut the U.S. military budget by $8.5 billion, stipulating that no cuts were to be taken from pay or benefit programs supporting members and veterans of the armed forces. These cuts would have reduced the emphasis of the U.S. budget on weapons programs. Donnelly also voted against the failed Polis amendment, which would have cut $640 million in a 2% across-the-board reduction in spending from the 2012 United States Department of Homeland Security appropriations bill. He voted for the 2012 National Defense Authorization Act. Civil liberties advocates have criticized Donnelly for voting for Section 1021, expanding the president's authority to detain suspected al-Qaeda, Taliban, or associated forces (including U.S. citizens) without a trial. Donnelly has voted to reauthorize the Patriot Act, and to require FISA warrants for wiretaps in the U.S., but not abroad.

=== Immigration ===
Donnelly voted against the DREAM Act on December 8, 2010. In 2018, Donnelly voted in favor of the McCain-Coons comprehensive immigration bill, which would have provided a pathway to citizenship but did not include any funding for a border wall; he also voted to withhold funds from sanctuary cities, in favor of Susan Collins's bipartisan proposal that included both a pathway to citizenship for Dreamers and funding for border security, and in support of Trump's proposal to allow a pathway to citizenship while funding a border wall and reducing legal immigration. Donnelly said that he supports more funding for the border wall proposed by Trump.

In 2017, NumbersUSA, which seeks to reduce both legal and illegal immigration, gave him a 0% score; in 2015–16, the Federation for American Immigration Reform, which also supports immigration controls, gave him a 25% rating.

=== Environment ===
In 2016, the Defenders of Wildlife Action Fund gave him a 77% rating; in 2015–16 EarthRights International gave him a 40% rating; in 2015–16, Environment America gave him a 55% rating.

=== Gun laws ===
In 2018, Donnelly was given a "D" grade by the NRA Political Victory Fund (NRA-PVF) for his vote "to criminalize the private transfer of firearms between close friends and some family members, which according to the Obama Justice Department, is only enforceable through a federal firearms registry. Donnelly also supports ammunition restrictions on law-abiding citizens."

Donnelly was previously one of the few Senate Democrats who had received an "A" rating from the NRA-PVF for his consistent support of policies that the NRA supports. He has commended the NRA for its work with children on gun safety.

In 2007, he co-sponsored a bill that repealed the requirement in Washington, D.C. to have guns registered. The bill also repealed the ban on semi-automatic firearms and trigger locks. Two years later, Donnelly supported a law that would enact concealed carry reciprocity across state lines.

In 2013, Donnelly joined fourteen other Senate Democrats in voting against the proposed ban on assault weapons. He also voted to support expanded background checks that same year.

In 2017, he participated in the Chris Murphy gun control filibuster that was intended to persuade Republicans to support legislation that would have barred suspected terrorists and convicted criminals from purchasing guns. "I am a supporter of the Second Amendment," he said. "I'm also someone who believes it's reasonable for all of us to consider smart and responsible ways to reduce gun violence. Those things are not in opposition to each other." Despite Donnelly's participation in the filibuster, a liberal Donnelly supporter, Indianapolis Star columnist Matthew Tully, complained on June 15, 2016, that "Donnelly's overall record on gun policies, first in the House and now in the Senate, and his general avoidance of taking a leadership position on the issue, seems much less tolerable than it did four years ago."

=== Abortion ===
Donnelly personally opposes abortion and identifies as pro-life, describing himself as "committed to protecting the sanctity of life". He has mixed ratings from pro-choice and anti-abortion political action committees. Planned Parenthood, which supports legal abortion, has given him a lifetime score of 67% in line with their positions. NARAL Pro-Choice America gave him a 0% score based on their 2016 pro-choice positions. The National Right to Life Committee, which opposes legal abortion, has scored him as voting 40% in line with their positions in 2018, 25% in 2015, 70% in 2012, and 83% in 2010, his highest score. The anti-abortion Campaign for Working Families gave him a 38% grade in 2018. He was endorsed by Democrats for Life of America, a pro-life Democratic PAC.

He has voted for a 20-week abortion ban and co-sponsored a bill that would prohibit transporting a minor across state lines for an abortion. In 2011, he co-sponsored HR 3, the No Taxpayer Funding for Abortion Act. He voted to defund Planned Parenthood up through 2015, but voted in support of funding Planned Parenthood later in his career. In August 2015, his campaign treasurer, Kathy Davis, who had worked on a volunteer basis for four years, resigned from his campaign because he voted to defund Planned Parenthood after videos surfaced of Planned Parenthood officials discussing fetal tissue donations. He was one of only two Democratic Senators who voted to defund Planned Parenthood on this occasion, the other being Joe Manchin of West Virginia.

On March 30, 2017, Donnelly voted against H.J. Res. 43, which, when signed by President Trump, nullified a pending federal regulation that would have disallowed states to withhold money from abortion providers.

In November 2017, Donnelly was criticized by pro-life groups when he did not speak out against the DNC's presentation of a lifetime achievement award to the CEO of Planned Parenthood. "Donnelly is making it clear that he's willing to get in line with the party on abortion to maintain his support from Washington Democrats," complained the NRSC.

In 2018, he was one of three Democratic Senators who voted to ban abortions performed after 20 weeks of pregnancy.

=== LGBT rights ===
Donnelly has an overall mixed voting record on LGBT rights, receiving a rating of 30% from the Human Rights Campaign in 2010. In 2007, Donnelly cosponsored the Employment Non-Discrimination Act, but in 2009, he voted against the Matthew Shepard Act. In October 2009, Donnelly voted for 2009–2010 Defense Appropriations, which included the Matthew Shepard Act, which expanded federal hate crimes to include sexual orientation, gender identity and disabilities. On May 27, 2010, Donnelly voted against repealing Don't Ask, Don't Tell after military review and certification, though the next day, he voted for the 2010-2011 Defense Appropriation Authorizations bill, which included a provision repealing Don't Ask Don't Tell. In December 2010, Donnelly voted for the Don't Ask, Don't Tell Repeal Act of 2010. He was one of 17 Democratic Representatives to vote for H Amdt 1416 the Prohibits Use of Funds in Contravention of the Defense of Marriage Act in July 2012.

Having opposed same-sex marriage during his 2012 senatorial campaign, Donnelly announced in April 2013, five months after his election, that he had changed his position.

Donnelly received a rating of 80% from the Human Rights Campaign in 2017 for his time in the 114th Congress.

=== Other issues ===
In 2013, Donnelly co-sponsored the Senate bill to reauthorize the Violence Against Women Act.

In 2015, Donnelly voted for CISPA.

Donnelly was one of four Democrats to vote against the Stream Protection Rule. He was one of three Democrats to vote to confirm President Trump's first Supreme Court nominee, Neil Gorsuch, and the second Democrat to announce that he would meet with Brett Kavanaugh, Trump's second Supreme Court nominee. He ultimately voted against confirming Kavanaugh to the Supreme Court.

== Post-political career ==
In March 2019, Donnelly joined Washington, D.C. law firm Akin Gump Strauss Hauer & Feld as a partner.

In April 2019, with fellow former Senator Heidi Heitkamp (who also lost reelection in 2018), Donnelly launched One Country Project, an organization dedicated to helping Democrats reconnect with rural voters. He is also a member of the ReFormers Caucus of Issue One.

=== Ambassador to the Holy See ===
On October 8, 2021, President Biden nominated Donnelly to be the ambassador to the Holy See. The Senate Foreign Relations Committee held hearings on his nomination on December 14, 2021. The committee favorably reported his nomination to the Senate floor on January 12, 2022. On January 20, 2022, Donnelly was confirmed by the U.S. Senate via voice vote. On February 25, 2022, he was sworn into office. He presented his credentials to Pope Francis on April 11, 2022. On May 30, 2024, he announced that he would be stepping down from the post, effective July 8, 2024.

== Personal life ==
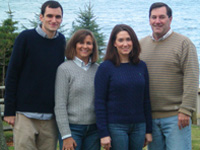
Donnelly with his wife and their two children

Donnelly met his wife, Jill, while attending the University of Notre Dame; the two married in 1979. They have two children. They live in Granger, an unincorporated suburban community northeast of South Bend.

As of 2013, Donnelly was the 26th poorest member of the U.S. Senate, with an estimated net worth of $781,504.

Donnelly is Roman Catholic.

== Electoral history ==
2004

Indiana's 2nd congressional district election, 2004
Party	Candidate	Votes	%	±%
Republican	Chris Chocola (incumbent)	140,496	54.2%	
Democratic	Joe Donnelly	115,513	44.5%	
Libertarian	Douglas Barnes	3,346	1.3%	
Turnout		259,355	62%	
Republican hold		Swing		

2006

Indiana's 2nd congressional district Democratic primary election, 2006
Party	Candidate	Votes	%	+%
Democratic	Joe Donnelly	30,589	83.0%	
Democratic	Steve Francis	6,280	17.0%	
Turnout		36,869		

Indiana's 2nd congressional district election, 2006
Party	Candidate	Votes	%	±%
Democratic	Joe Donnelly	103,561	54.0%	
Republican	Chris Chocola (incumbent)	88,300	46.0%	
Turnout		191,861	44%	
Democratic gain from Republican		Swing		

2008

Indiana's 2nd congressional district election, 2008
Party	Candidate	Votes	%	±%
Democratic	Joe Donnelly (incumbent)	187,416	67.1%	
Republican	Luke Puckett	84,455	30.2%	
Libertarian	Mark Vogel	7,475	2.7%	
Turnout		279,346	62%	
Democratic hold		Swing		

2010

Indiana's 2nd congressional district election, 2010
Party	Candidate	Votes	%	±%
Democratic	Joe Donnelly (incumbent)	91,341	48.2%	
Republican	Jackie Walorski	88,803	46.8%	
Libertarian	Mark Vogel	9,447	5.0%	
Turnout		189,591	41%	
Democratic hold		Swing		

2012

Democratic United States Senatorial Primary Election in Indiana, 2012
Party	Candidate	Votes	%
Democratic	Joe Donnelly	207,715	100
Total votes		207,715	100

United States Senate election in Indiana, 2012
Party	Candidate	Votes	%	±%
Democratic	Joe Donnelly	1,281,181	50.04%	+50.04%
Republican	Richard Mourdock	1,133,621	44.28%	−43.08%
Libertarian	Andy Horning	145,282	5.67%	−6.92%
No party	Write-Ins	18	0 %	n/a
Majority		147,560	5.76%	−69.49%
Turnout		2,560,102	57.46%	+26.24%
Democratic gain from Republican		Swing		

2018

United States Senate election in Indiana, 2018
Party	Candidate	Votes	%	±%
Republican	Mike Braun	1,158,000	50.73%	+6.45%
Democratic	Joe Donnelly (incumbent)	1,023,553	44.84%	−5.20%
Libertarian	Lucy Brenton	100,942	4.42%	−1.25%
n/a	Write-ins	70	0.01%	+0.01%
Total votes		2,282,565	100.0%	N/A
Republican gain from Democratic				

U.S. House of Representatives
Preceded by Chris Chocola	Member of the U.S. House of Representatives from Indiana's 2nd congressional district 2007–2013	Succeeded by Jackie Walorski
Party political offices
Vacant Title last held by David Johnson; 2000	Democratic nominee for U.S. Senator from Indiana (Class 1); 2012, 2018	Succeeded by Valerie McCray
U.S. Senate
Preceded by Richard Lugar	U.S. Senator (Class 1) from Indiana; 2013–2019; Served alongside: Dan Coats, Todd Young	Succeeded by Mike Braun
Diplomatic posts
Preceded by Patrick Connell; Acting	United States Ambassador to the Holy See; 2022–2024	Succeeded by Laura Hochla; Acting
U.S. order of precedence (ceremonial)
Preceded by John Edwards as Former U.S. Senator	Order of precedence of the United States	Succeeded by Carol Moseley Braun as Former U.S. Senator
