= National Republican Trust Political Action Committee =

- Founder: Scott Wheeler
- Type: Political action committee
- Website: nationalrepublicantrust.org

The National Republican Trust Political Action Committee is a conservative political action committee run by Scott Wheeler. The committee describes themselves as "conservative Republicans dedicated to helping restore the GOP to its historic conservative roots by mobilizing like-minded Republicans nationwide."

== Fundraising ==
During the 2009 run-up to the United States Senate special election in Massachusetts, 2010, the trust contributed $95,000 to the election of Scott Brown.

== Ad campaigns ==
On November 1, 2008, just days before the United States presidential election between Barack Obama and John McCain, NBC ran an NRT anti-Obama ad featuring Jeremiah Wright during a broadcast of Saturday Night Live. Dann reported that the ad cost more than $11 million.

In 2010, NRT produced "Kill Ground Zero Mosque", a 60-second ad "urging Americans to oppose the building of a mosque two blocks from New York's Ground Zero". According to the ad, "On Sept. 11, they declared war against us, and to celebrate that murder of 3,000 Americans, they want to build a monstrous 13-story mosque at Ground Zero." NBC and CBS rejected the ad due to its "vague language".

In November 2010, it was reported that five Fox affiliates and one ABC affiliate owned by Sinclair Broadcast Group had broadcast an infomercial critical of then-President Barack Obama, Breaking Point: 25 Minutes that will Change America, which was sponsored by NRT. The infomercial painted Obama as an extremist, and claimed that, during the 2008 presidential campaign, he received some campaign money from the Hamas terrorist group, and that Obama said in a speech, "You want freedom? You’re gonna have to kill some crackers! You gonna have to kill some of those babies." The special also discusses Obama advisers Van Jones and John Holdren, as well as Obama staff Anita Dunn, Kevin Jennings, Carol Browner and Cass Sunstein – all in an unflattering light; in one case, the special claimed that Holdren said that trees should be permitted to sue humans in court. The infomercial aired at various times during the weekend of October 30, 2010 on Sinclair-owned stations in Madison, Cape Girardeau, Lexington, Pittsburgh, Des Moines, and Winston-Salem – all in swing states vital to the 2010 elections.
