= Dennie Oxley =

American politician

Member of the Indiana House of Representatives from the 73rd district
- In office November 4, 1998 – November 5, 2008
- Preceded by: Dennis H. Heeke
- Succeeded by: Dennie Oxley Sr.

Personal details
- Born: December 22, 1970 (age 55) Huntingburg, Indiana, U.S.
- Party: Democratic
- Spouse: Harley Barding
- Education: Indiana University Southeast
- Profession: Educator

Dennie Ray Oxley II (born December 22, 1970) is a former Democratic member of the Indiana House of Representatives, representing the 73rd District from 1998 until 2008.

In 2008 he ran for Lieutenant Governor of Indiana with Jill Long Thompson in the Indiana gubernatorial election, 2008, but lost to Mitch Daniels and Becky Skillman 57–40.

Oxley was arrested in 2009 for misrepresenting himself as a state legislator to a police officer to avoid arrest for public intoxication. He was found guilty and given three months probation.

Party political offices
Preceded by Kathy Davis	Democratic nominee for Lieutenant Governor of Indiana; 2008	Succeeded by Vi Simpson
