= WGU Indiana =

WGU Indiana is a private online university established by the state of Indiana to expand access to higher education for Indiana residents. It is part of the Western Governors University. Formed by a partnership between the state and Western Governors University, the university offers more than 50 undergraduate and graduate degree programs. As of May 31, 2016, it served roughly 4,500 students across the state of Indiana.

WGU Indiana is a wholly owned subsidiary of Western Governors University, which was founded in 1997 by 19 U.S. governors to expand access to higher education through online degree programs. WGU Indiana provides new educational opportunities for Indiana residents without ongoing state subsidy. WGU Indiana accepts applications only from residents in the state of Indiana. There is no minimum high school grade point average for admission, and no minimum score on the SAT or ACT. However, all applicants must pass an admissions examination administered by the university.

== History ==
WGU Indiana was established through an executive order on June 14, 2010 by Indiana Governor Mitch Daniels, as a partnership between the state and Western Governors University in an effort to expand access to higher education for Indiana residents and increase the percentage of the state's adult population with education beyond high school.

== Academic model ==
WGU Indiana uses a mentor-guided model that requires students to demonstrate their knowledge rather than spending time in a classroom. Adult students have often acquired many of the skills necessary for a degree through life and work experiences. WGU's system is designed to enable students to employ such previously learned skills in proving their competency while earning a degree. Each WGU Indiana student is assigned a mentor, who provides one-on-one coaching, guidance, and support from enrollment through graduation. Learning resources, which include textbooks, webinars, simulations, and online tutorials, have been developed by third-party sources and are reviewed by councils of industry representatives to ensure that they are relevant to employers’ needs.

== Accreditation ==
WGU Indiana degrees are granted under the current accreditation of Western Governors University, which is regionally accredited through the Northwest Commission on Colleges and Universities (NWCCU) and nationally accredited through the Distance Education and Training Commission (DETC). The Teachers College programs are accredited by the National Council for Accreditation of Teacher Education (NCATE). Nursing programs are accredited by the Commission on Collegiate Nursing Education (CCNE).

== Affordibility and accessibility ==
WGU Indiana tuition is charged at a flat rate for six-month terms, not per credit hour or semester. Tuition for most undergraduate programs is $2,890.02 per term. Students may begin their terms at the first of any month. WGU Indiana is an approved education provider for Indiana state grants and scholarships offered through the State Student Assistance Commission of Indiana (SSACI). As a wholly owned subsidiary of Western Governors University, WGU Indiana is approved by the U.S. Department of Education to offer federal financial aid. WGU Indiana's online model makes college possible for adults who may not be able to travel to a campus by providing flexibility to complete studies while meeting work and family obligations.

== Governance and Indiana operations ==
WGU Indiana is led by Chancellor Alison Bell, who is based in the university's Indianapolis office. The Chancellor reports to Western Governors University President Scott D. Pulsipher. WGU Indiana works under the guidance of an advisory board of corporate, community, and education leaders in the state.

WGU Indiana Advisory Board members are:

- Vince Bertram, President and CEO, Project Lead The Way
- Linda Buskirk, Owner and President, Accountable Solutions
- Kathy Davis, Former Lieutenant Governor, Founder, Davis Design Group
- David Harris, President & CEO, The Mind Trust
- Jamie Merisotis, President, Lumina Foundation for Education
- Senator Earline Rogers, State of Indiana
- Ron Stiver, Sr. Vice President, Engagement & External Affairs, Clarian Health

== Federal Investigation/Audit ==
An audit by the Department of Education's Office of Inspector General, released on September 21, 2017, "concluded that Western Governors University did not comply with the institutional eligibility requirement that limits the percentage of regular students who may enroll in correspondence courses." It found that most courses at the university fell short of the required standards to be considered eligible for Title IV Federal Financial Aid. According to the report, "at least 69 of the 102 courses were not designed to offer regular and substantive interaction with an instructor and, therefore, did not meet the regulatory definition of distance education." The U.S. Department of Education's Office of Inspector General recommended that WGU repay the federal government more than $712 million.

In January 2019, the U.S. Department of Education's Federal Student Aid (FSA) office issued their final audit determining that WGU was indeed eligible to participate in federal student aid. In making its final determination, FSA reviewed the Department's Office of Inspector General's (OIG) report, examined WGU's records regarding interactions between students and academic staff during the year audited, and also reviewed the favorable findings of WGU's accrediting agency regarding the institution's academic model. FSA determined that, particularly in light of a lack of clear guidance from the department at the time of the audit period, WGU's efforts to comply with the governing law and regulations were reasonable and undertaken in good faith. OIG ultimately agreed with FSA's issuance of the final audit determination.
