= Advance America =

Advance America may refer to:

- Advance America (advocacy group), a political lobbying organization in Indiana
- A payday loan provider in the United States owned by Grupo Elektra
