= 2008 Indiana gubernatorial election =

- November 4, 2008
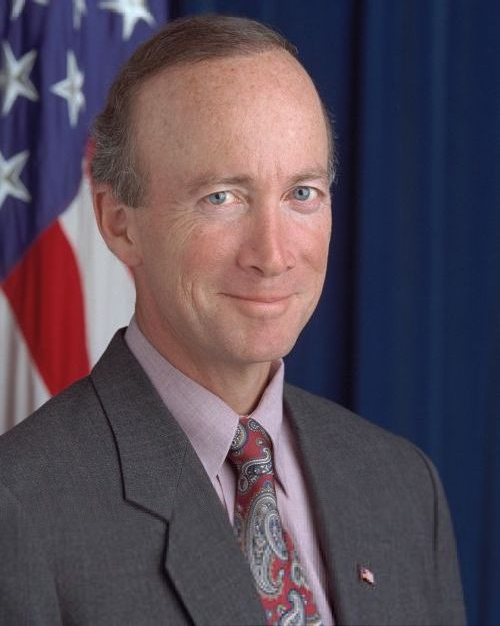

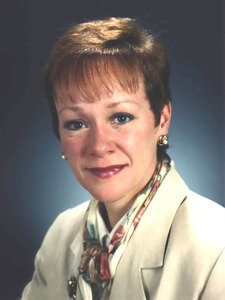
Nominee	Mitch Daniels	Jill Long Thompson
Party	Republican	Democratic
Running mate	Becky Skillman	Dennie Oxley
Popular vote	1,563,885	1,082,463
Percentage	57.84%	40.04%
- County results Daniels: 40–50% 50–60% 60–70% 70–80% 80–90% Thompson: 40–50% 50–60% 60–70%
Governor before election
Mitch Daniels
Republican
Elected Governor
Mitch Daniels
Republican

The 2008 Indiana gubernatorial election was held on November 4, 2008. Incumbent Republican nominee Mitch Daniels was challenged by Democratic nominee Jill Long Thompson and Libertarian nominee Andy Horning. Daniels easily won reelection, defeating Long Thompson by over 17 points. Despite Daniels' landslide victory, Barack Obama narrowly carried Indiana in the concurrent presidential election, the only Democratic candidate to do so since 1964. As of 2024, this is the last election in which Marion County (containing the state's largest city, Indianapolis) would vote Republican for governor and a statewide race.

== Primaries ==
May 6, 2008 – Democratic and Republican primary elections.

October 6, 2008 – Deadline for voter registration for the general election.

=== Democratic ===
On the Democratic side, Indianapolis businessman Jim Schellinger and former U.S. Representative Jill Long Thompson announced their candidacies. Indiana Senate Minority Leader Richard Young also ran early, but dropped out of the race well before the primary. Schellinger raised over $1 million in campaign funds, with support of key Democratic officials such as former Indiana House Speaker John R. Gregg, former Indianapolis Mayor Bart Peterson and U.S. Representative Julia Carson. Long Thompson's support came from Democrats such as popular former U.S. Representative Andrew Jacobs, Jr. and former Indiana First Lady Maggie Kernan.

The contest was very close. The difference between the two was 13,769 votes out of over 1.1 million cast, a difference of 1.1%. Both Long Thompson and Schellinger won various counties from many different political geographies of the state. Schellinger narrowly beat Long Thompson in heavily populated Marion County, home of Indianapolis. Long Thompson trounced Schellinger in Allen County, home of Fort Wayne, the second most populous city in the state. Many attribute her very narrow statewide victory to her strong performance in Allen County. Schellinger also did well in Evansville and the Indianapolis suburbs. Long Thompson and Schellinger basically split the rural vote. It was one of the closest statewide primaries in state history, and also had the highest turnout of any Indiana non-presidential primary. Schellinger called Long Thompson around 5 a.m. the day after the election to concede. He pledged her his full support.

County results: Long Thompson: 50–60%; 60–70%; 70–80%; Schellinger: 50–60%; 60–70%

Democratic primary results
Party	Candidate	Votes	%
Democratic	Jill Long Thompson	582,860	50.60
Democratic	Jim Schellinger	569,091	49.40
Total votes		1,151,951	100.00

On June 16, Long Thompson announced that her running mate and the Democratic nominee for lieutenant governor would be longtime State Representative Dennie Oxley.

=== Republican ===
On June 16, 2007, incumbent Governor Mitch Daniels announced he was running for reelection with his Lieutenant Governor Becky Skillman. He was unopposed in the Republican primary.

Republican primary results
Party	Candidate	Votes	%
Republican	Mitch Daniels (incumbent)	350,390	100.00
Total votes		350,390	100.00

=== Libertarian ===
Andy Horning, an engineer, Libertarian Party activist and frequent candidate, ran unopposed for his party's nomination. He appeared on the November ballot with Lisa Kelly as his running mate.

== General election ==
=== Debates ===
Three debates organized by the Indiana Debate Commission were held:

- Tuesday, September 16 at the Star Plaza Theatre in Merrillville, Indiana
- Tuesday, September 23 at the Jasper Arts Center in Jasper, Indiana
- Tuesday, October 14 at the Indiana University Auditorium in Bloomington, Indiana, moderated by former Indianapolis broadcaster Tom Cochrun

=== Predictions ===
Source	Ranking	As of
The Cook Political Report	Lean R	October 16, 2008
Rothenberg Political Report	Likely R	November 2, 2008
Sabato's Crystal Ball	Lean R	November 3, 2008
Real Clear Politics	Lean R	November 4, 2008

=== Polling ===
Polling had largely shown Daniels with a slight lead over both Long Thompson and Schellinger. Long Thompson later slipped further behind Daniels in most polls. In the last polls before the election, conducted by Public Policy Polling (November 2, 2008), Daniels led Long Thompson 60% to 37%.

=== Results ===
2008 Indiana gubernatorial election
Party	Candidate	Votes	%	±%
Republican	Mitch Daniels/Becky Skillman (incumbent)	1,563,885	57.84%	+4.63
Democratic	Jill Long Thompson/Dennie Oxley	1,082,463	40.04%	−5.45
Libertarian	Andy Horning	57,376	2.12%	+0.83
No party	Write-Ins	27	0.00%	—
Majority		481,422		
Turnout		2,703,751	62%	
Republican hold		Swing		

==== By county ====
Daniels won 79 of Indiana's counties, compared to 13 for Long Thompson.

County	Daniels	Votes	Long Thompson	Votes	Others	Votes	Total
Adams	61.3%	8,291	36.5%	4,938	2.2%	294	13,523
Allen	61.0%	89,938	37.3%	55,027	1.7%	2,449	147,414
Bartholomew	70.6%	21,547	27.7%	8,447	1.7%	533	30,527
Benton	62.8%	2,398	34.3%	1,308	2.9%	109	3,815
Blackford	57.2%	3,098	41.0%	2,221	1.8%	97	5,416
Boone	80.5%	21,352	17.5%	4,633	2.0%	540	26,525
Brown	61.3%	4,967	35.6%	2,880	3.1%	250	8,097
Carroll	63.8%	5,586	33.4%	2,925	2.8%	241	8,752
Cass	56.3%	8,831	40.9%	6,418	2.8%	433	15,682
Clark	60.7%	28,622	37.9%	17,821	1.4%	682	47,125
Clay	52.7%	5,986	44.6%	5,055	2.7%	312	11,353
Clinton	67.7%	8,322	29.8%	3,658	2.5%	306	12,286
Crawford	38.9%	1,869	59.7%	2,869	1.4%	68	4,806
Daviess	58.5%	6,043	38.5%	3,978	3.0%	310	10,331
Dearborn	67.3%	14,536	30.3%	6,540	2.4%	519	21,595
Decatur	72.8%	7,486	24.6%	2,534	2.6%	270	10,290
DeKalb	57.1%	9,562	40.4%	6,752	2.5%	424	16,738
Delaware	56.5%	27,876	41.7%	20,588	1.8%	895	49,359
Dubois	54.3%	9,946	43.3%	7,938	2.4%	445	18,329
Elkhart	57.8%	40,983	39.7%	28,114	2.5%	1,740	70,837
Fayette	58.2%	5,373	39.8%	3,670	2.0%	180	9,223
Floyd	62.3%	22,471	36.1%	13,020	1.6%	576	36,067
Fountain	58.5%	4,350	37.9%	2,816	3.6%	269	7,435
Franklin	61.6%	6,443	35.2%	3,674	3.2%	337	10,454
Fulton	58.7%	5,309	38.6%	3,493	2.7%	247	9,049
Gibson	60.1%	9,087	38.1%	5,757	1.8%	270	15,114
Grant	61.8%	16,006	36.4%	9,431	1.8%	462	25,899
Greene	50.1%	6,756	46.5%	6,261	3.4%	464	13,481
Hamilton	83.3%	106,574	15.2%	19,442	1.5%	1,863	127,879
Hancock	77.1%	26,395	20.6%	7,053	2.0%	800	34,248
Harrison	56.9%	10,277	41.2%	7,447	1.9%	342	18,066
Hendricks	77.1%	49,490	20.9%	13,381	2.0%	1,301	64,172
Henry	57.1%	12,142	40.1%	8,519	2.8%	589	21,250
Howard	61.6%	23,852	36.5%	14,143	1.9%	755	38,750
Huntington	65.7%	10,555	32.0%	5,139	2.3%	377	16,071
Jackson	56.0%	9,729	41.5%	7,218	2.5%	433	17,380
Jasper	54.1%	6,737	43.5%	5,419	2.4%	296	12,452
Jay	57.0%	4,763	40.8%	3,404	2.2%	180	8,347
Jefferson	51.1%	6,671	47.0%	6,127	1.9%	242	13,040
Jennings	51.1%	6,016	45.7%	5,373	3.2%	381	11,770
Johnson	77.4%	44,743	20.4%	11,813	2.2%	1,279	57,835
Knox	46.0%	7,119	52.8%	8,165	1.2%	376	15,464
Kosciusko	67.5%	19,901	30.0%	8,825	2.5%	751	29,477
LaGrange	57.3%	5,441	39.3%	3,727	3.4%	322	9,490
Lake	34.6%	66,145	64.0%	122,111	1.4%	2,748	191,004
LaPorte	33.9%	15,495	63.4%	28,922	2.7%	1,241	45,658
Lawrence	57.5%	10,504	39.8%	7,281	2.7%	495	18,280
Madison	59.7%	34,028	38.3%	21,776	2.0%	1,120	56,924
Marion	55.5%	209,955	42.5%	160,318	2.0%	7,377	377,650
Marshall	56.8%	10,314	41.0%	7,447	2.2%	394	18,155
Martin	55.4%	2,714	41.5%	2,030	3.1%	153	4,897
Miami	58.1%	7,816	38.4%	5,174	3.5%	469	13,459
Monroe	47.3%	28,482	49.8%	30,026	2.9%	1,764	60,272
Montgomery	74.2%	11,304	23.7%	3,605	2.1%	317	15,226
Morgan	70.0%	19,818	26.8%	7,570	3.2%	908	28,296
Newton	49.9%	2,999	47.0%	2,822	3.1%	186	6,007
Noble	56.0%	9,408	41.3%	6,951	2.7%	453	16,812
Ohio	55.4%	1,590	41.8%	1,197	2.8%	80	2,867
Orange	50.6%	4,046	47.0%	3,760	2.4%	192	7,998
Owen	57.9%	4,717	37.8%	3,074	4.3%	347	8,138
Parke	50.6%	3,553	46.1%	3,240	3.3%	235	7,028
Perry	37.7%	3,169	61.1%	5,133	1.2%	98	8,400
Pike	48.1%	2,850	49.3%	2,924	2.6%	157	5,931
Porter	43.1%	31,388	54.4%	39,519	2.5%	1,802	72,709
Posey	62.7%	7,983	36.0%	4,592	1.3%	164	12,739
Pulaski	53.6%	3,096	43.7%	2,524	2.7%	153	5,773
Putnam	65.6%	9,443	32.0%	4,597	2.4%	346	14,386
Randolph	59.5%	6,268	37.8%	3,987	2.7%	280	10,535
Ripley	60.8%	7,347	35.9%	4,342	3.3%	402	12,091
Rush	66.6%	5,071	30.3%	2,311	3.1%	237	7,619
Saint Joseph	47.8%	56,176	50.5%	59,259	1.7%	1,978	117,413
Scott	49.5%	4,414	48.5%	4,330	2.0%	180	8,924
Shelby	67.2%	11,774	30.0%	5,259	2.8%	489	17,522
Spencer	54.8%	5,527	43.9%	4,418	1.3%	134	10,079
Starke	47.0%	4,339	51.3%	4,726	1.7%	161	9,226
Steuben	55.9%	7,896	41.3%	5,822	2.8%	402	14,120
Sullivan	40.5%	3,463	55.9%	4,779	3.6%	311	8,553
Switzerland	47.6%	1,730	48.9%	1,776	3.5%	126	3,632
Tippecanoe	61.9%	41,740	35.6%	23,980	2.5%	1,710	67,430
Tipton	67.0%	5,244	30.4%	2,376	2.6%	204	7,824
Union	53.1%	1,756	42.7%	1,412	4.2%	138	3,306
Vanderburgh	62.3%	48,033	36.4%	28,090	1.3%	994	77,117
Vermillion	38.7%	2,769	58.2%	4,164	3.1%	223	7,156
Vigo	50.6%	21,941	47.1%	20,448	2.3%	1,011	43,400
Wabash	64.4%	8,578	33.3%	4,434	2.3%	308	13,320
Warren	51.7%	2,057	45.3%	1,804	3.0%	119	3,980
Warrick	65.1%	18,498	33.5%	9,531	1.4%	386	28,415
Washington	54.4%	6,141	43.4%	4,894	2.2%	249	11,284
Wayne	52.4%	14,832	43.2%	12,203	4.2%	1,198	28,233
Wells	65.4%	8,418	32.3%	4,153	2.3%	292	12,863
White	61.2%	6,620	35.6%	3,845	3.2%	343	10,808
Whitley	60.4%	8,997	37.4%	5,566	2.2%	320	14,883

Counties that flipped from Tied to Democratic

- Switzerland (Largest city: Vevay)
- Crawford (Largest city: Marengo)

Counties that flipped from Democratic to Republican

- Clark (Largest city: Jeffersonville)
- Delaware (largest city: Muncie)
- Marion (Largest city: Indianapolis)
- Scott (Largest city: Scottsburg)
- Vanderburgh (largest city: Evansville)
- Vigo (largest city: Terre Haute)
