= 2004 Indiana gubernatorial election =

- November 2, 2004
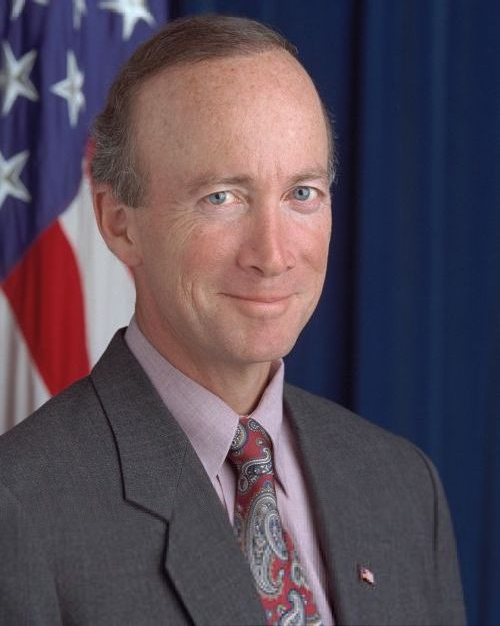

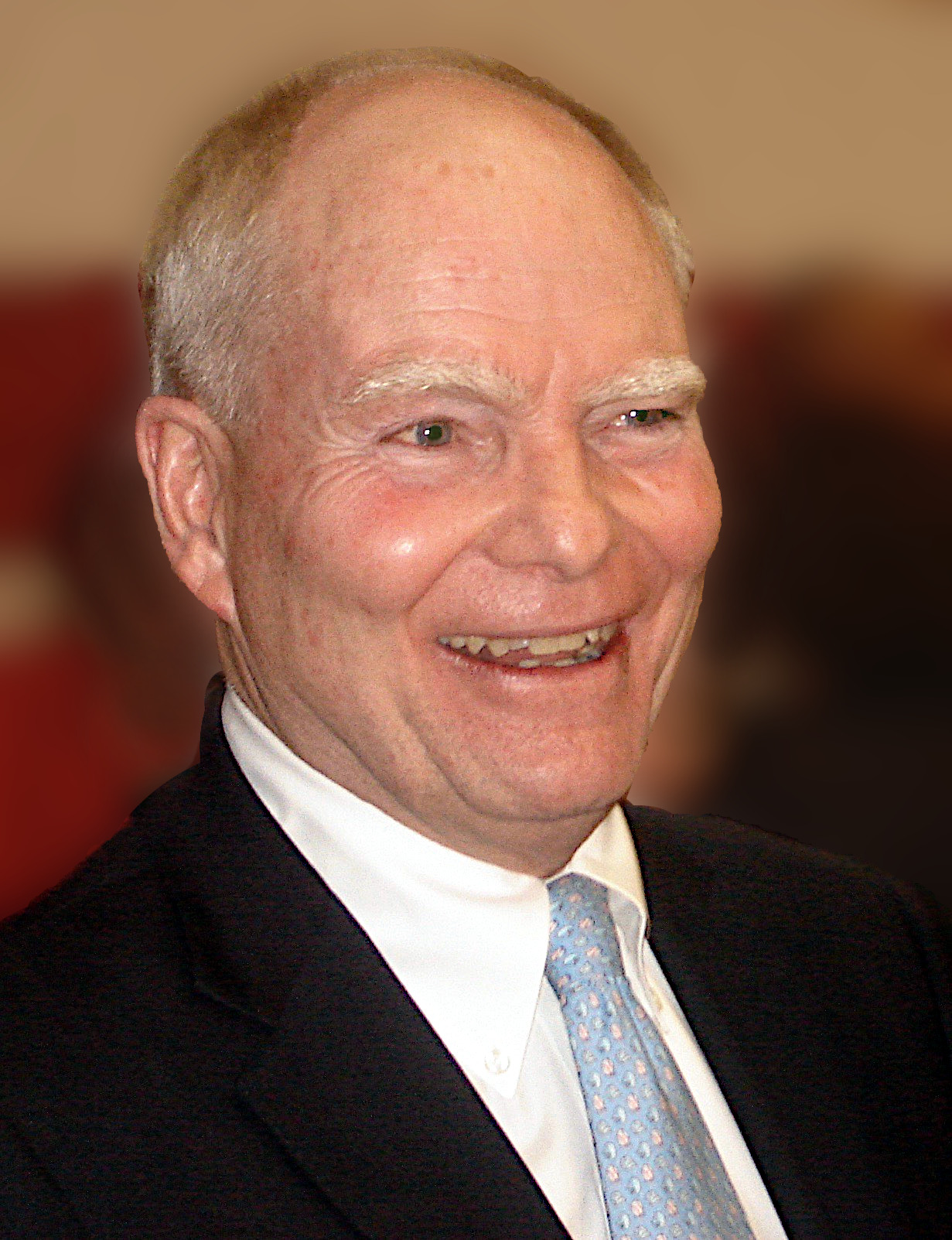
Nominee	Mitch Daniels	Joe Kernan
Party	Republican	Democratic
Running mate	Becky Skillman	Kathy Davis
Popular vote	1,302,912	1,113,900
Percentage	53.21%	45.49%
- County results Daniels: 50–60% 60–70% 70–80% Kernan: 40–50% 50–60% 60–70% Tie: 40–50%
Governor before election
Joe Kernan
Democratic
Elected Governor
Mitch Daniels
Republican

The 2004 Indiana gubernatorial election took place on November 2, 2004, to elect the governor of Indiana.

Despite Democrat Evan Bayh winning the concurring Senate election in a landslide, Incumbent Democratic governor Joe Kernan was defeated by Republican Mitch Daniels. Daniels' victory was the first time the Republican Party had been elected governor since 1984, and gave the party control of all the important statewide offices. It was also the first time an incumbent governor had been defeated since the Constitution of Indiana was amended in 1972 to permit governors to serve two consecutive terms.

== Democratic primary ==
=== Candidates ===
- Joe Kernan, incumbent governor since 2002

==== Withdrew ====
- Joe Andrew, former chair of the Democratic National Committee
- Vi Simpson, state senator from Bloomington

=== Campaign ===
Frank O'Bannon had been re-elected governor of Indiana in 2000 and was prevented from running for governor again by term limits. His lieutenant governor, Joe Kernan, on December 15, 2002, said that he would not be a candidate for governor. State Senator Vi Simpson and Joe Andrew then vied for nomination for the next ten months. However, on September 13, 2003, O'Bannon had a stroke and died, resulting in Kernan taking over as governor. Kernan decided two months later, on November 4, 2003, that he would run for governor in 2004 and was unopposed in the Democratic primary after both Simpson and Andrew dropped out.

=== Results ===
Democratic primary results
Party	Candidate	Votes	%
Democratic	Joe Kernan (incumbent)	283,924	100.00
Total votes		283,924	100.00

== Republican primary ==
=== Candidates ===
- Mitch Daniels, former White House Director of the Office of Management and Budget
- Eric Miller, activist

==== Withdrew ====
- David M. McIntosh, nominee in 2000 and former U.S. representative from Muncie

=== Campaign ===
Former White House Director of the Office of Management and Budget Mitch Daniels easily defeated conservative activist Eric Miller in the Republican primary on May 4, 2004. The Republican candidate for governor in 2000, David M. McIntosh, had earlier dropped out of the race after President George W. Bush gave his support to Daniels. Daniels had quit as White House budget director in 2003 so he could return to Indiana and run for governor. President Bush came to South Bend, Indiana before the primary to support Daniels, and the President's nickname for Daniels, "My Man Mitch", became his campaign slogan.

=== Results ===
Daniels: 50–60%; 60–70%; 70–80%; 80–90%; Miller: 50–60%

Republican primary results
Party	Candidate	Votes	%
Republican	Mitch Daniels	335,828	66.40
Republican	Eric Miller	169,930	33.60
Total votes		505,758	100.00

== General election ==
=== Campaign ===
Daniels campaigned by traveling throughout Indiana in his RV visiting all 92 Indiana counties at least three times. Kernan fell behind in the polls in May 2004 and never caught up, despite closing the gap in September after attacking Daniels' plan to sell an Indiana utility to an out of state firm. The economy of Indiana was a major issue in the campaign with Kernan, as incumbent, facing pressure over the state's budget troubles.

In addition to the two major party tickets, there was the Libertarian ticket of Kenn Gividen and Elaine Badnarik.

All three candidates took part in two debates during the campaign. The first was held on September 28, 2004, at Franklin College with the candidates clashing over the state's economy, prescription drugs and the extension of Interstate 69 from Indianapolis to Evansville. The second debate was held on October 17, 2004, in New Albany, Indiana. Negative campaigning was the major issue.

Between Daniels and Kernan the two candidates raised over 28 million dollars, easily surpassing the previous record set in 2000 of 19.2 million dollars.

=== Predictions ===
Source	Ranking	As of
Sabato's Crystal Ball	Likely R (flip)	November 1, 2004

=== Polling ===
Poll source	Date(s) administered	Sample size (Note: Key: A – all adults RV – registered voters LV – likely voters V – unclear)	Margin of error	Mitch Daniels (R)	Joe Kernan (D)	Other / Undecided
SurveyUSA	October 27–29, 2004	587 (LV)	± 4.1%	52%	44%	4%

=== Statewide Results ===
Indiana gubernatorial election, 2004
Party	Candidate	Votes	%	±%
Republican	Mitch Daniels/Becky Skillman	1,302,912	53.21%	+11.54%
Democratic	Joe Kernan/Kathy Davis (incumbents)	1,113,900	45.49%	−11.06%
Libertarian	Kenn Gividen/Elaine Badnarik	31,664	1.29%	−0.48%
Write-ins		22	0.00%	
Majority		189,012	7.72%	−7.16%
Turnout		2,448,498	57%	
Republican gain from Democratic		Swing		

=== County Results ===
Kernan won 17 of Indiana's counties compared to 73 for Daniels. The candidates finish tied in 2 counties.

County	Daniels	Votes	Kernan	Votes	Gividen	Votes	Total
Adams	62.9%	8,350	36.3%	4,816	0.7%	99	13,265
Allen	57.2%	73,689	41.9%	53,899	0.9%	1,183	128,771
Bartholomew	59.4%	16,858	38.8%	11,008	1.8%	519	28,385
Benton	60.8%	2,432	37.2%	1,498	1.7%	69	3,999
Blackford	51.2%	2,741	47.9%	2,567	0.9%	46	5,354
Boone	70.9%	16,189	27.3%	6,326	1.3%	305	22,820
Brown	55.0%	4,010	42.8%	3,118	2.2%	164	7,292
Carroll	59.2%	5,090	39.4%	3,387	1.3%	115	8,592
Cass	56.9%	7,946	41.6%	5,808	1.6%	221	13,975
Clark	49.0%	20,471	50.2%	20,964	0.9%	360	41,795
Clay	54.3%	5,724	44.3%	4,677	1.4%	148	10,549
Clinton	63.8%	7,537	35.0%	4,129	1.3%	148	11,814
Crawford	49.3%	2,231	49.3%	2,231	1.4%	60	4,522
Daviess	59.5%	6,223	38.7%	4,049	1.8%	183	10,455
Dearborn	61.3%	12,514	37.2%	7,573	1.5%	297	20,384
Decatur	63.4%	6,355	35.2%	3,524	1.4%	140	10,019
DeKalb	59.8%	9,242	39.0%	6,012	1.2%	181	15,435
Delaware	48.0%	22,917	50.6%	24,132	1.4%	663	47,712
Dubois	57.1%	9,385	41.9%	6,871	1.0%	169	16,425
Elkhart	62.7%	38,430	36.5%	22,406	0.8%	503	61,339
Fayette	53.4%	4,981	45.3%	4,224	1.3%	121	9,326
Floyd	50.1%	16,869	49.1%	16,503	0.8%	279	33,651
Fountain	61.6%	4,786	37.1%	2,878	1.3%	101	7,765
Franklin	59.4%	5,822	39.4%	3,862	1.2%	114	9,798
Fulton	58.4%	5,103	40.3%	3,513	1.3%	110	8,726
Gibson	50.1%	7,289	48.1%	7,101	1.1%	166	14,556
Grant	57.2%	15,543	41.8%	11,376	1.0%	275	27,194
Greene	51.7%	6,791	46.7%	6,123	1.6%	213	13,127
Hamilton	73.0%	76,433	26.1%	27,316	0.9%	920	104,669
Hancock	67.4%	18,825	31.3%	8,746	1.3%	359	27,930
Harrison	53.7%	9,242	45.3%	7,809	1.0%	171	17,222
Hendricks	68.6%	35,761	30.2%	15,691	1.2%	641	52,093
Henry	56.0%	11,408	42.6%	8,674	1.4%	289	20,371
Howard	53.7%	19,885	45.2%	16,742	1.1%	415	37,042
Huntington	67.1%	10,484	31.7%	4,953	1.2%	183	15,620
Jackson	58.8%	9,587	40.0%	6,527	1.2%	191	16,305
Jasper	58.2%	6,781	40.4%	4,701	1.4%	167	11,649
Jay	56.2%	4,537	42.8%	3,453	1.0%	80	8,070
Jefferson	51.1%	6,542	47.7%	6,109	1.2%	150	12,801
Jennings	55.4%	5,806	42.8%	4,482	1.8%	190	10,478
Johnson	66.9%	34,269	31.7%	16,253	1.4%	701	51,223
Knox	48.5%	7,569	50.0%	7,797	1.5%	228	15,594
Kosciusko	71.0%	20,047	27.9%	7,885	1.1%	316	28,248
LaGrange	63.2%	5,748	35.2%	3,171	1.1%	97	9,016
Lake	33.7%	61,720	64.9%	118,697	1.4%	2,617	183,034
LaPorte	38.5%	16,234	59.4%	25,049	2.1%	881	42,164
Lawrence	65.0%	11,480	33.5%	5,904	1.5%	257	17,641
Madison	51.4%	28,142	47.5%	25,972	1.1%	623	54,737
Marion	46.5%	148,825	52.3%	167,097	1.2%	3,895	319,817
Marshall	60.6%	10,745	38.2%	6,756	1.2%	204	17,705
Martin	53.7%	2,664	44.4%	2,205	1.9%	94	4,963
Miami	60.9%	8,155	37.8%	5,062	1.3%	179	13,396
Monroe	44.5%	22,031	53.1%	26,317	2.4%	1,192	49,540
Montgomery	66.2%	9,639	32.4%	4,711	1.4%	199	14,549
Morgan	64.6%	16,716	33.8%	8,740	1.6%	424	25,880
Newton	54.5%	3,164	43.6%	2,531	1.9%	111	5,806
Noble	61.3%	9,570	37.6%	5,863	1.1%	176	15,609
Ohio	52.5%	1,512	46.1%	1,328	1.4%	41	2,881
Orange	56.4%	4,818	42.4%	3,621	1.3%	109	8,548
Owen	55.0%	4,179	42.7%	3,249	2.3%	176	7,604
Parke	53.8%	3,745	44.6%	3,101	1.6%	108	6,954
Perry	43.0%	3,559	56.2%	4,640	0.8%	64	8,263
Pike	41.1%	2,517	57.3%	3,510	1.6%	99	6,126
Porter	43.2%	27,565	55.1%	35,206	1.7%	1,108	63,879
Posey	52.6%	6,252	46.5%	5,525	0.9%	109	11,886
Pulaski	57.8%	3,185	41.1%	2,267	1.1%	61	5,513
Putnam	60.8%	8,002	37.8%	4,984	1.4%	185	13,171
Randolph	56.8%	6,274	41.9%	4,628	1.3%	146	11,048
Ripley	59.1%	6,925	39.6%	4,635	1.3%	151	11,711
Rush	61.9%	4,529	36.6%	2,676	1.6%	116	7,321
Saint Joseph	45.3%	49,198	53.8%	58,327	0.9%	1,000	108,525
Scott	44.7%	3,862	54.3%	4,681	1.0%	90	8,633
Shelby	61.9%	9,862	36.9%	5,885	1.2%	194	15,941
Spencer	52.3%	5,183	46.5%	4,612	1.2%	114	9,909
Starke	46.6%	4,024	52.2%	4,539	1.5%	131	8,694
Steuben	60.2%	7,684	38.5%	4,915	1.3%	165	12,764
Sullivan	44.2%	3,687	54.4%	4,530	1.4%	116	8,333
Switzerland	49.3%	1,780	49.3%	1,780	1.4%	48	3,608
Tippecanoe	54.9%	28,458	43.4%	22,504	1.7%	865	51,827
Tipton	60.5%	4,729	38.1%	2,973	1.4%	108	7,810
Union	61.5%	2,040	36.7%	1,217	1.8%	59	3,316
Vanderburgh	48.9%	34,129	49.9%	34,819	1.2%	863	69,811
Vermillion	39.5%	2,769	58.8%	4,121	1.7%	118	7,008
Vigo	42.4%	16,804	55.6%	22,054	2.0%	806	39,664
Wabash	64.9%	8,691	34.1%	4,569	1.0%	134	13,394
Warren	56.0%	2,214	42.5%	1,679	1.5%	58	3,951
Warrick	53.8%	13,877	45.2%	11,678	1.0%	262	25,817
Washington	59.2%	6,419	39.6%	4,297	1.2%	134	10,850
Wayne	52.5%	14,530	45.4%	12,565	2.1%	595	27,690
Wells	66.4%	8,071	32.7%	3,979	0.9%	113	12,163
White	57.5%	5,980	40.9%	4,260	1.6%	167	10,407
Whitley	62.9%	8,332	36.0%	4,758	1.1%	149	13,239

==== Counties that flipped from Democratic to Republican ====
- Madison (largest city: Anderson)
- Spencer (largest city: Santa Claus)
- Tippecanoe (largest city: Lafayette)
- Blackford (Largest city: Hartford City)
- Crawford (Largest city: Marengo) (became tied)
- Floyd (Largest city: New Albany)
- Gibson (Largest city: Princeton)
- Jefferson (Largest city: Madison)
- Posey (Largest city: Mount Vernon)
- Switzerland (Largest city: Vevay) (became tied)
- Warrick (Largest city: Boonville)
- Adams (Largest city: Decatur)
- Allen (Largest city: Fort Wayne)
- Bartholomew (Largest city: Columbus)
- Benton (Largest city: Fowler)
- Brown (Largest city: Nashville)
- Carroll (Largest city: Delphi)
- Warrick (Largest city: Logansport)
- Clay (Largest city: Brazil)
- Decatur (Largest city: Greensburg)
- DeKalb (Largest city: Auburn)
- Dubois (Largest city: Jasper)
- Fayette (Largest city: Connersville)
- Fountain (Largest city: Attica)
- Franklin (Largest city: Brookville)
- Fulton (Largest city: Rochester)
- Grant (Largest city: Marion)
- Greene (Largest city: Linton)
- Hancock (Largest city: Greenfield)
- Harrison (Largest city: Corydon)
- Henry (Largest city: New Castle)
- Howard (Largest city: Kokomo)
- Jackson (Largest city: Seymour)
- Jay (Largest city: Portland)
- Jennings (Largest city: North Vernon)
- LaGrange (Largest city: LaGrange)
- Marshall (Largest city: Plymouth)
- Martin (Largest city: Loogootee)
- Montgomery (Largest city: Crawfordsville)
- Newton (Largest city: Kentland)
- Noble (Largest city: Kendallville)
- Ohio (Largest city: Rising Sun)
- Orange (Largest city: Paoli)
- Owen (Largest city: Spencer)
- Parke (Largest city: Rockville)
- Pulaski (Largest city: Winamac)
- Putnam (Largest city: Greencastle)
- Randolph (Largest city: Winchester)
- Ripley (Largest city: Batesville)
- Rush (Largest city: Rushville)
- Shelby (Largest city: Shelbyville)
- Steuben (Largest city: Angola)
- Tipton (Largest city: Tipton)
- Warren (Largest city: Williamsport)
- Washington (Largest city: Salem)
- Wayne (Largest city: Richmond)
- White (Largest city: Monticello)
- Whitley (Largest city: Columbia City)

== See also ==
- Advance America - Political lobbying organization run by Eric Miller
