= Jill Long Thompson =

American politician and academic

Jill Long
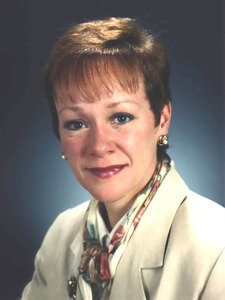
- Official portrait, c. 1990s

8th Chair of the Farm Credit Administration
- In office November 27, 2012 – March 12, 2015
- President: Barack Obama
- Preceded by: Leland Strom
- Succeeded by: Kenneth Spearman

Under Secretary of Agriculture for Rural Development
- In office 1995–2001
- President: Bill Clinton

Member of the U.S. House of Representatives from Indiana's 4th district
- In office March 28, 1989 – January 3, 1995 (Note: Long's official service begins on the date of the special election, while she was not sworn in until April 5, 1989.)
- Preceded by: Dan Coats
- Succeeded by: Mark Souder

Personal details
- Born: Jill Lynette Long; July 15, 1952 (age 74) Warsaw, Indiana, U.S.
- Party: Democratic
- Spouse: Don Thompson (m. 1995; died 2022)
- Education: Valparaiso University (BA); Indiana University, Bloomington (MBA, PhD)

Jill Lynette Long Thompson (born July 15, 1952) is an American politician, educator, and author. A former U.S. Representative from Indiana, she is the author of The Character of American Democracy, published by Indiana University Press in September 2020. From 2015 to 2020 she taught ethics as a visiting clinical associate professor at the Kelley School of Business and the O'Neill School of Public and Environmental Affairs at Indiana University Bloomington and during the 2020–2021 academic year she served as a visiting scholar with the Ostrom Workshop, also at Indiana University. Until 2015 she was board chair and CEO of the Farm Credit Administration, a position to which President Barack Obama appointed her. The first person in her family to graduate from college, she earned a B.S. in business administration at Valparaiso University and an M.B.A. and Ph.D. in business at Indiana University. She is a member of the Democratic Party.

Long Thompson's political career began when she was elected to the Valparaiso city council in 1983. She was elected to the United States House of Representatives in 1989, representing a heavily Republican district for three terms. In 1995, President Bill Clinton nominated her to serve as Under Secretary of Agriculture for Rural Development.

== Family background and education ==
Born in Warsaw, Indiana, Jill Lynette Long was raised on a family farm outside Larwill, Whitley County, Indiana. She graduated from Columbia City Joint High School in Columbia City. She earned an M.B.A. (1978) and Ph.D. (1984) from Indiana University, and a B.S. (1974) in business from Valparaiso University. She was married to Don Thompson, a fighter pilot, airline captain, and farmer who died on July 14, 2022.

== Political career ==
Long Thompson began her political career in 1983 at age 31, when she launched a successful campaign to win a seat on the Valparaiso City Council, a post she held from 1984 to 1986.

In 1986, she became the first woman in Indiana in either major party to win the nomination for U.S. Senate, a race she lost to incumbent Senator and future Vice President Dan Quayle.

In 1989, Long won an uphill race for Congress in a special election in Indiana's 4th Congressional District, defeating Republican Dan Heath. The seat became vacant when Dan Coats was appointed to the Senate to replace Quayle, who had won the Vice Presidency on the Republican ticket with George H. W. Bush. Long Thompson won despite skepticism about her chances from the Democratic Congressional Campaign Committee and others in Washington. Her narrow election made national news because Indiana's 4th Congressional District was considered a safe Republican seat. Long Thompson took a congratulatory phone call from the Vice President during a victory press conference as reporters watched. She easily won reelection in 1990 and 1992, but lost to Republican Mark Souder in 1994. As a member of Congress, she served on the Agriculture and Veterans' Affairs Committees, as well as on the Select Committee on Hunger, and chaired the Congressional Rural Caucus. She was one of the first in Congress to propose a gift ban. She was also a National Vice Chair of the Democratic Leadership Council and a speaker at the 1992 Democratic National Convention in New York.

In 1995, President Bill Clinton appointed Long Thompson Under Secretary of Agriculture for Rural Development, where she served until 2001. As Under Secretary, she managed 7,000 employees and a $10 billion budget, which funded rural housing, rural business, and rural utility programs. Among her accomplishments as Under Secretary were reforming the single-family loan programs, helping create thousands of jobs in economically challenged rural communities, and improving the efficiency of the department. She attempted to return to the House in 2002 when she ran for the open congressional seat in the 2nd District. She won a contested primary, but narrowly lost the general election to Chris Chocola.

In 2008, Long Thompson won a hotly contested primary for the Democratic nomination for governor of Indiana. She became the first woman in Indiana history to be nominated for governor by a major party. She made reforming state government, accountability, and making larger investments in vocational education the focal points of her campaign. Long Thompson lost to incumbent Governor Mitch Daniels by 18% of the vote in a year in which Barack Obama was the first Democrat since Lyndon Johnson to win a presidential race in Indiana.

=== Educator ===
Long Thompson taught in the College of Business at Valparaiso University from 1981 through the spring of 1986, when she entered the race for United States Senate. In 1995 she served as a fellow at the Institute of Politics at Harvard University's John F. Kennedy School of Government. From 2003 to 2007, she served as CEO and Senior Fellow at the National Center for Food and Agricultural Policy in Washington, D.C. From 2015 to 2020 she taught ethics at the Kelley School of Business and the O'Neill School of Public and Environmental Affairs at Indiana University Bloomington. (history.house.gov/People/Detail17117)

=== Author ===
Long Thompson is the author of The Character of American Democracy published by Indiana University Press in September 2020. {Indiana University Press ISBN 9780253050427} She also produced and edited Across the Aisle: Why Bipartisanship Works for America, published by Indiana University Press in August 2024. {Indiana University Press ISBN 0253070708}

=== Farm Credit Administration ===
In October 2009, President Barack Obama nominated Long Thompson to the Farm Credit Administration Board, the independent agency that oversees the Farm Credit System. The nomination was pending confirmation by the U.S. Senate when Obama installed Long Thompson on the board by recess appointment on March 27, 2010. The Senate confirmed her in September 2010. On November 27, 2012, she assumed the role of board chair and CEO of the Farm Credit Administration, with a term ending in May 2014. She continued to serve at the Farm Credit Administration until March 12, 2015.

== See also ==
- Women in the United States House of Representatives

== Sources ==
- Biography at the Biographical Directory of the United States Congress
- Profile at Vote Smart
- Appearances on C-SPAN

Party political offices
Preceded by Birch Bayh	Democratic nominee for U.S. Senator from Indiana (Class 3); 1986	Succeeded by Baron Hill
Preceded by Joe Kernan	Democratic nominee for Governor of Indiana; 2008	Succeeded by John Gregg
U.S. House of Representatives
Preceded by Dan Coats	Member of the U.S. House of Representatives from Indiana's 4th congressional district 1989–1995	Succeeded by Mark Souder
U.S. order of precedence (ceremonial)
Preceded by Ralph Abraham as Former U.S. Representative	Order of precedence of the United States as Former U.S. Representative	Succeeded by David M. McIntosh as Former U.S. Representative
