= Becky Skillman =

American politician (born 1950)

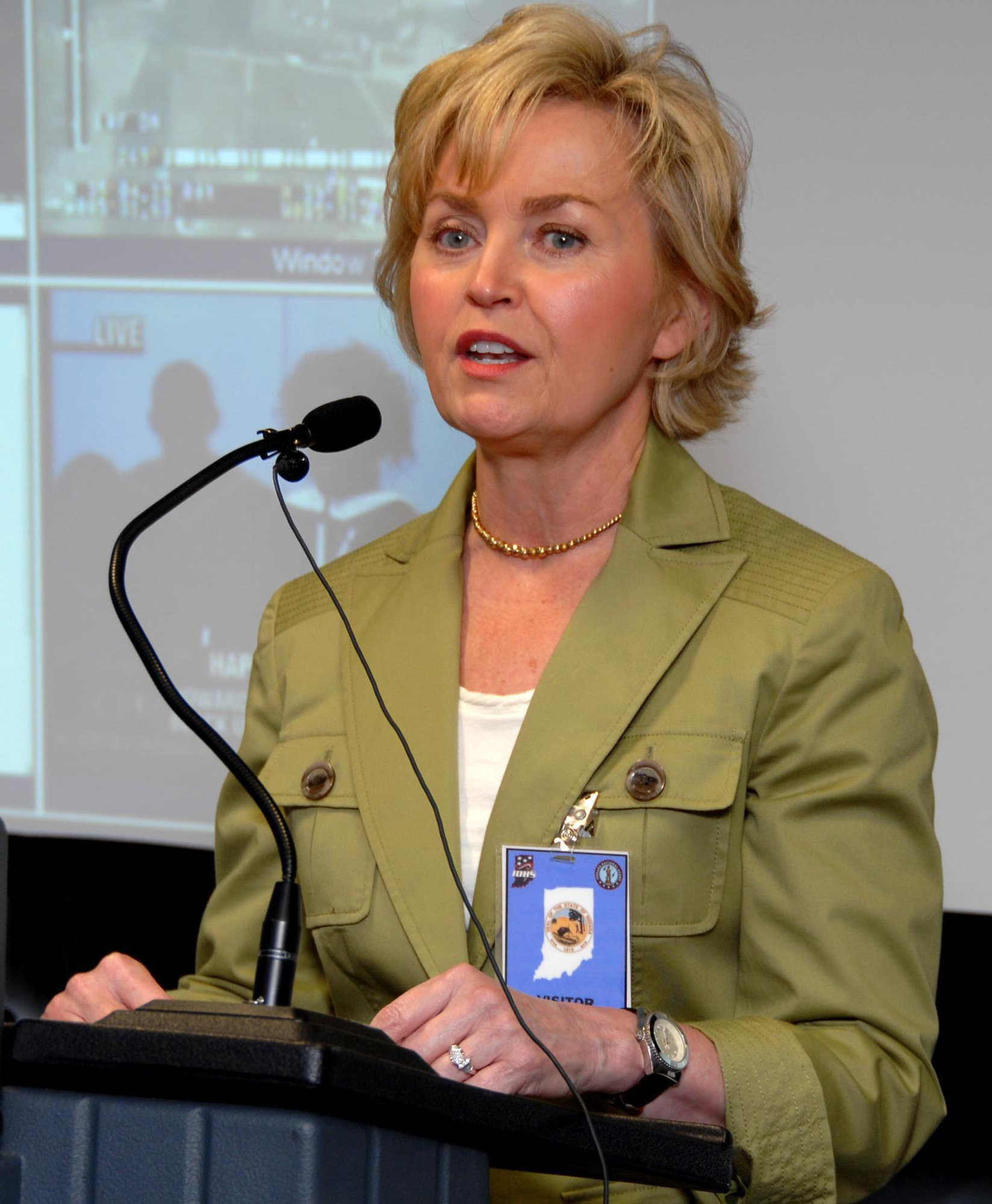

49th Lieutenant Governor of Indiana
- In office January 10, 2005 – January 14, 2013
- Governor: Mitch Daniels
- Preceded by: Kathy Davis
- Succeeded by: Sue Ellspermann

Member of the Indiana Senate from the 44th district
- In office November 4, 1992 – November 3, 2004
- Preceded by: Joseph V. Corcoran
- Succeeded by: Brent Steele

Personal details
- Born: September 26, 1950 (age 76) Bedford, Indiana, U.S.
- Party: Republican
- Spouse: Steve Skillman
- Education: Indiana Wesleyan University
- Profession: Politician, Economic Development Leader

Rebecca S. Skillman (born September 26, 1950) is an American politician who served as the 49th Lieutenant Governor of Indiana, from 2005 to 2013. She is a member of the Republican Party.

In the 2024 Indiana gubernatorial election, Skillman endorsed Suzanne Crouch in the Republican Primary.

== Early life and career ==
Skillman is a native of Bedford, Lawrence County, Indiana. An alumna of Indiana Wesleyan University, she began her career in politics in 1977 when she was elected to the office of Lawrence County Recorder. Eight years later she was elected as County Clerk. Skillman served as President of the Association of Indiana Counties.

Skillman with Navy Blue Angel #7, Major Nathan Miller, during an appearance on August 23, 2007

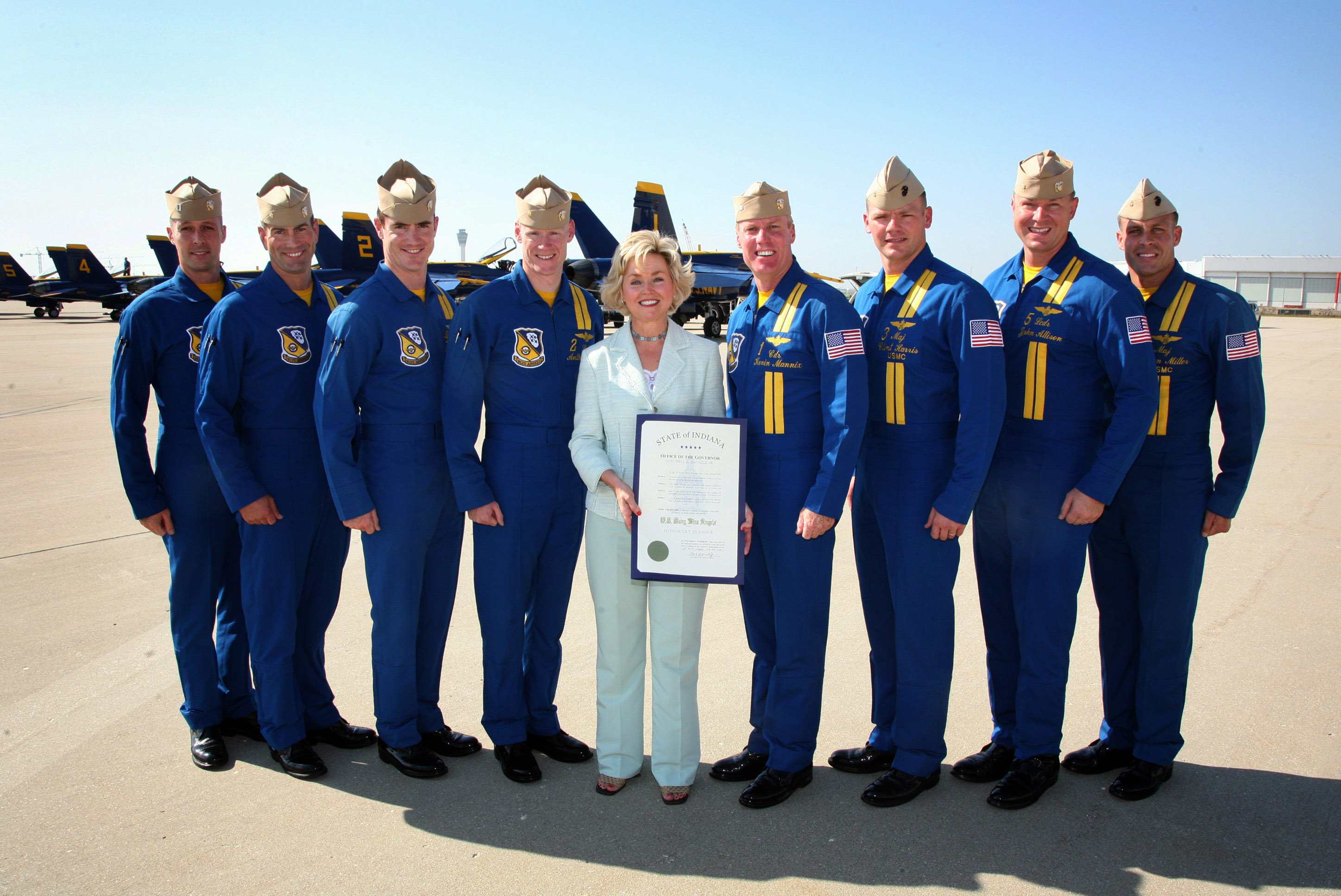
Skillman presenting a certificate declaring the Blue Angels as Honorary Hoosiers

== State senate ==
In 1992, after 16 years as an elected official in Lawrence County, Skillman was elected to the Indiana State Senate, where she represented all or part of Lawrence, Monroe, Jackson, Washington, and Orange Counties. Rising quickly through the leadership, she became Majority Caucus Chair, the first woman in history to serve in the Senate Republican leadership. During her 12 years in the Senate, she led the charge to include the state's small towns and rural communities in its economic development agenda. There, she authored plans for development in distressed counties and for the revitalization of downtown areas.

== Lieutenant governor ==
Mitch Daniels selected Skillman to be his running mate during the 2004 election. The ticket was elected over incumbent Governor Joe Kernan and incumbent Lieutenant Governor Kathy Davis and she took office in January.

As Indiana's 49th Lt. Governor, Skillman held more legal duties than any other Lt. Governor in the country. Upon taking office in 2005, Skillman also served as the Secretary of Agriculture and Rural Development under the state's Department of Agriculture and Office of Community Rural Affairs. She managed five state agencies in total, and administered more than $1 billion in programs. Other agencies under Skillman's direction as Lt. Governor included the Office of Energy Development, the Indiana Housing and Community Development Authority, and the Office of Tourism Development. Additionally, she chaired the state's Counter Terrorism and Security Council, the intergovernmental entity responsible for homeland security, and served as President of the Indiana Senate.

Skillman was also responsible for shepherding Governor Mitch Daniels's Administration's legislative agenda through the Indiana General Assembly and served as President of the Senate.

== Radius Indiana ==
Skillman currently serves as Chair of the Board of Directors of Radius Indiana, an eight-county economic development corporation in South Central Indiana. Prior to accepting the board chair position in 2017, she served as president and CEO, beginning in February 2013; during her tenure, Radius rose in prominence among economic development organizations in the state. She also served as the co-chair of the Indiana Bicentennial Commission, with former U.S. Congressman Lee Hamilton.

== 2012 election ==
Skillman had considered a run for Indiana Governor in 2012 but announced she would not due to a minor medical condition.

== Personal life ==
Skillman and her husband Steve have a son, Aaron. Skillman is a member of the Church of Christ. In August 2010 Skillman earned an associate degree in business from Indiana Wesleyan University.

== See also ==
- List of female lieutenant governors in the United States

Party political offices
Preceded by J. Murray Clark	Republican nominee for Lieutenant Governor of Indiana; 2004, 2008	Succeeded by Sue Ellspermann
Indiana Senate
Preceded by Joseph V. Corcoran	Member of the Indiana Senate from the 44th district 1992–2004	Succeeded by Brent Steele
Political offices
Preceded by Kathy Davis	Lieutenant Governor of Indiana; 2005–2013	Succeeded by Sue Ellspermann
