= Mitch Daniels =

American politician and academic administrator (born 1949)

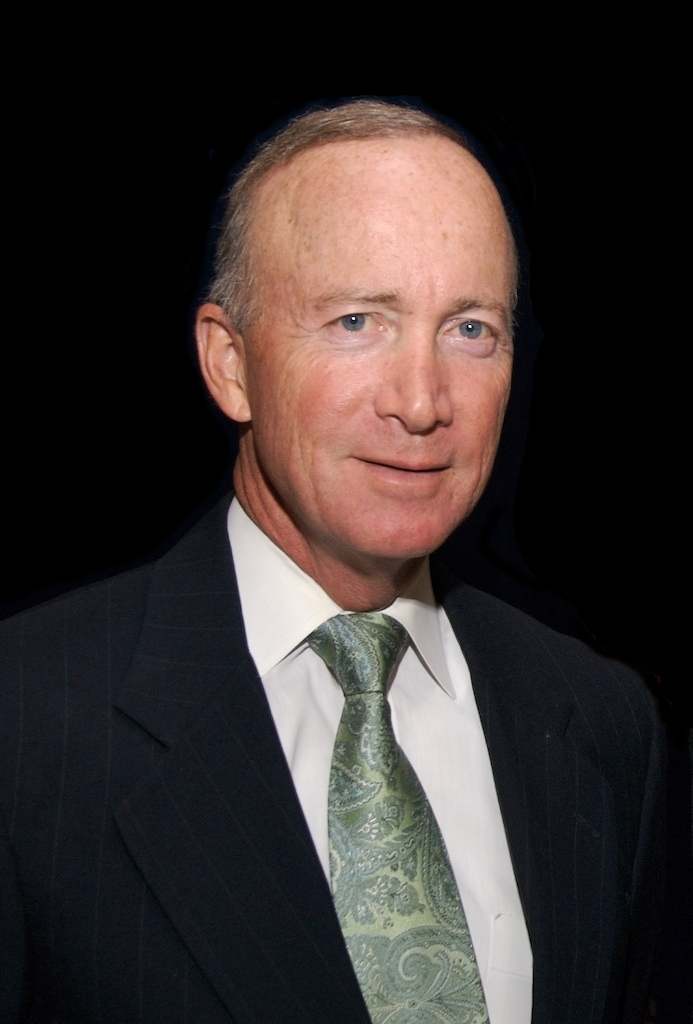
- Daniels in 2009

President of Purdue University
- Incumbent
- Assumed office July 1, 2026; Acting
- Preceded by: Mung Chiang
- In office January 14, 2013 – December 31, 2022
- Preceded by: Timothy Sands (acting)
- Succeeded by: Mung Chiang

49th Governor of Indiana
- In office January 10, 2005 – January 14, 2013
- Lieutenant: Becky Skillman
- Preceded by: Joe Kernan
- Succeeded by: Mike Pence

33rd Director of the Office of Management and Budget
- In office January 20, 2001 – June 6, 2003
- President: George W. Bush
- Deputy: Sean O'Keefe; Nancy P. Dorn
- Preceded by: Jack Lew
- Succeeded by: Joshua Bolten

White House Director of Political and Intergovernmental Affairs
- In office October 1, 1985 – March 1, 1987
- President: Ronald Reagan
- Preceded by: Ed Rollins
- Succeeded by: Frank Donatelli

Director of the White House Office of Intergovernmental Affairs
- In office March 26, 1985 – October 1, 1985
- President: Ronald Reagan
- Preceded by: Lee Verstandig
- Succeeded by: Deborah Steelman

Personal details
- Born: Mitchell Elias Daniels Jr; April 7, 1949 (age 77) Monongahela, Pennsylvania, U.S.
- Party: Republican
- Spouses: Cheri Herman (m. 1978; div. 1993); (m. 1997)
- Children: 4
- Education: Princeton University (BA); Indiana University, Indianapolis (attended); Georgetown University (JD)

Mitchell Elias Daniels Jr. (born April 7, 1949) is an American academic administrator, businessman, author, and retired politician. A Republican, he served as the 49th governor of Indiana from January 2005 to January 2013. He is the interim president of Purdue University as of July 2026 since the departure of Mung Chiang. He was also the 12th president of the university from January 2013 to December 2022 .

Daniels began his career as an assistant to senator Richard Lugar, working as his chief of staff in the Senate from 1977 to 1982. He was appointed executive director of the National Republican Senatorial Committee when Lugar was chairman from 1983 to 1984. He worked as a chief political advisor and as a liaison to President Ronald Reagan in 1985. He then moved back to Indiana to become president of the Hudson Institute, a conservative think tank. He later joined Eli Lilly and Company where he served as president of North American Pharmaceutical Operations from 1993 to 1997 and as senior vice president of corporate strategy and policy from 1997 to 2001. In January 2001, Daniels was appointed by President George W. Bush as the director of the U.S. Office of Management and Budget, where he served until June 2003.

Daniels ran in Indiana's 2004 gubernatorial election after leaving the Bush administration. He won the Republican primary with 67% of the vote and defeated Democratic incumbent Governor Joe Kernan in the general election. In 2008, Daniels was reelected to a second term, defeating Jill Long Thompson. During his tenure, Daniels cut the state government workforce by 18%, cut and capped state property taxes, balanced the state budget through austerity measures and increasing spending by less than the inflation rate. In his second term, Daniels saw protest by labor unions and Democrats in the state legislature over Indiana's school voucher program, privatization of public highways, and the attempt to pass 'right to work' legislation, leading to the 2011 Indiana legislative walkouts. During the legislature's last session under Daniels, he signed a 'right-to-work law', with Indiana becoming the 23rd state in the nation to pass such legislation.

It was widely speculated that Daniels would be a candidate in the 2012 presidential election, but he chose not to run. Shortly after, a search committee, composed mostly of Purdue faculty and administrators recommended Daniels to become the university's 12th president after his term as governor ended on January 14, 2013. Ultimately, the hiring decision was made by the Trustees of the Board of Purdue University, all of whom Daniels appointed or re-appointed while Governor. During his term as president of Purdue University, speculation emerged that Daniels would be a candidate in the 2016 presidential election, but Daniels ultimately did not run. He retired as Purdue president on January 1, 2023.

== Early life ==
=== Family and education ===
Mitchell Elias Daniels Jr. was born on April 7, 1949, in Monongahela, Pennsylvania, the son of Dorothy Mae (née Wilkes) and Mitchell Elias Daniels. His father's parents were Syrian immigrants from Qalatiyah, Syria, of Antiochian Greek Orthodox descent. Daniels has been honored by the Arab-American Institute with the 2011 Najeeb Halaby Award for Public Service. His mother's ancestry was mostly English (where three of his great-grandparents were born). Daniels spent his early childhood years in Pennsylvania, Tennessee, and Georgia.

The Daniels family moved to Indiana from Tennessee in 1959 when his father accepted a job at the Indianapolis headquarters of the pharmaceutical company Pitman-Moore. The 10-year-old Daniels was accustomed to the mountains, and he at first disliked the flatland of central Indiana. He was still in grade school at the time of the move and first attended Delaware Trail Elementary, Westlane Junior High School, and North Central High School. In high school he was student body president. After graduation in 1967, Daniels was named one of Indiana's Presidential Scholars—the state's top male high school graduate that year—by President Lyndon B. Johnson.

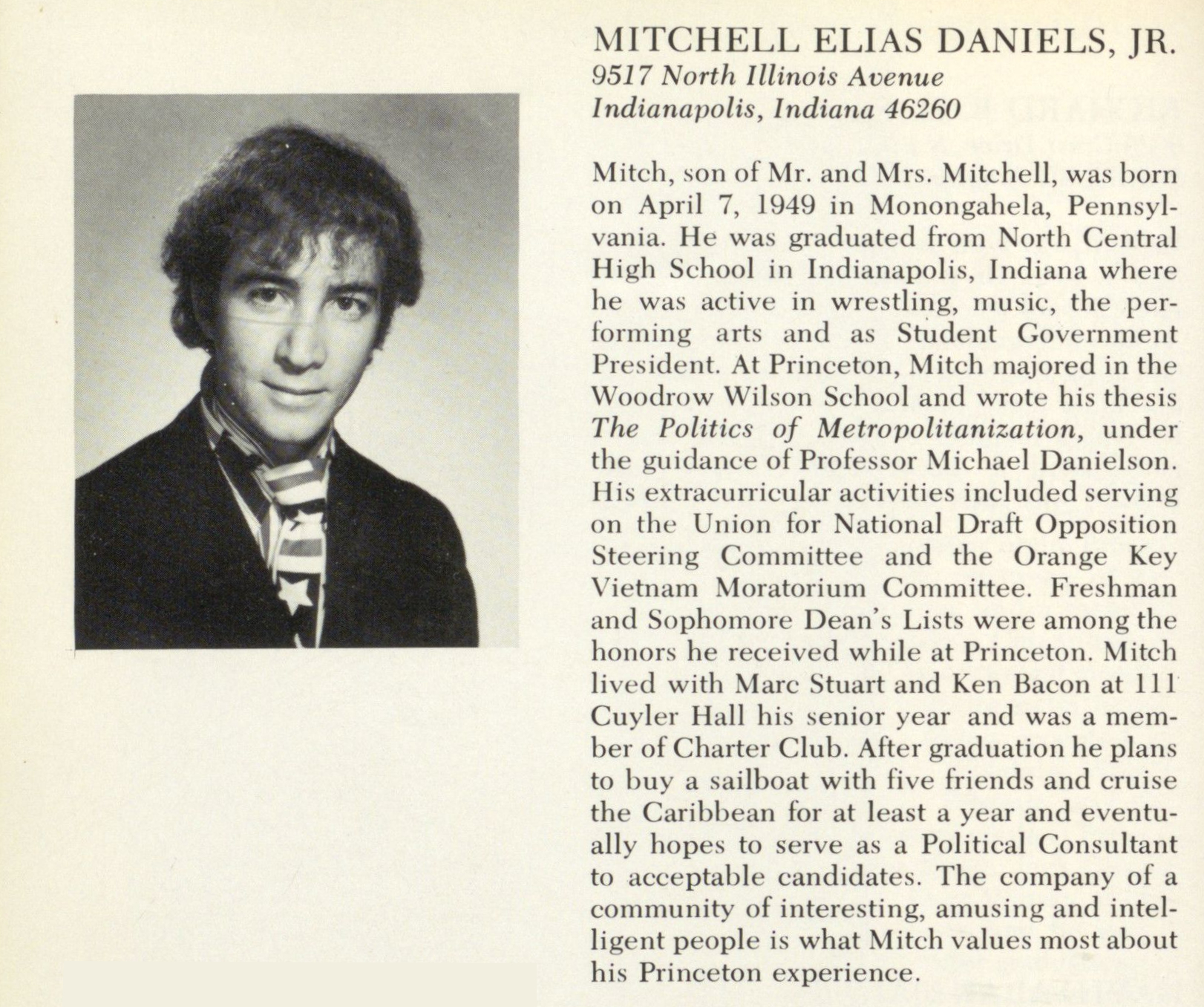
Daniels in the Princeton University yearbook, 1971

In 1971, Daniels earned a bachelor's degree from the Woodrow Wilson School of Public and International Affairs at Princeton University after completing a senior thesis titled "The Politics of Metropolitanization: City-County Consolidation in Indianapolis, Indiana". While at Princeton, he was a member of the American Whig–Cliosophic Society, where he overlapped with future Supreme Court Justice Samuel Alito, who was a year below. He initially studied law at the Indiana McKinney School of Law in Indianapolis. After accepting a job with newly elected Senator Richard Lugar, he transferred to the Georgetown University Law Center, from which he earned a Juris Doctor.

=== Drug arrest ===
In 1970, while an undergraduate at Princeton, Daniels and three roommates were a part of a several months long drug investigation that began on Saturday, March 7, 1970, when one of Daniels's roommates was arrested for possessing "large quantities" of marijuana and other drugs. Two months later police raided the same residence hall, finding enough marijuana to fill two size 12 shoeboxes and arresting five additional individuals, including Daniels. Daniels and a roommate were charged with possession of marijuana, LSD and other drugs, along with "maintaining a common nuisance" for allowing the room to be used for the sale and use of drugs. In a plea agreement, the prosecutor dropped the charges in exchange for Daniels agreeing to pay a fine of $350 for using marijuana.

Thirty-four years after the arrest, the first roommate detained (the individual arrested months before Daniels), told the Indianapolis Star that he was a partisan Democrat who "would gladly offer unflattering information about a Republican—if he had any" but Daniels had "nothing to do" with selling drugs. Another roommate said that police obtained a warrant to search the room based on the activity of the first roommate arrested. "Unbeknownst to [Daniels and the other current roommates] ... [he] was coming back there and using the room when we're not there and was involved with drugs much worse than pot...We considered ourselves innocent victims." Daniels refutes the idea that he was innocent saying he "had used marijuana" and "was fined for that, and that was appropriate". Daniels has disclosed the arrest on job applications and in government background checks and spoken about the incident in opinion columns.

In a 1989 opinion piece in The Washington Post, Daniels called the incident the "unfortunate confluence of my wild oats period and America's libertine apogee" and said "On my college campus, just as on most college campuses, marijuana was as easy to obtain as Budweiser beer and was viewed with equal complacency. For a time, I was a carefree consumer of both." Daniels claimed his "young Midwestern tail was jerked back into line" following the arrest.

=== Early political career ===
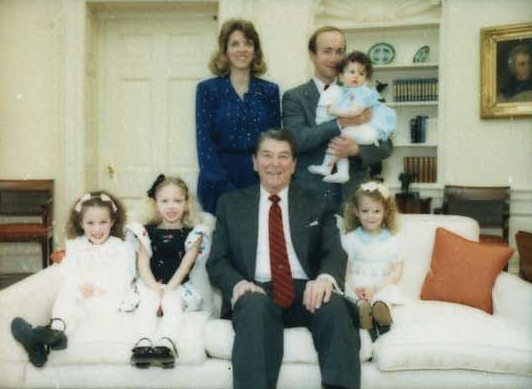
The Daniels family with President Ronald Reagan in 1987

Daniels had his first experience in politics while still a teenager when, in 1968, he worked on the unsuccessful campaign of fellow Hoosier and Princeton alumnus William Ruckelshaus, who was running for the U.S. Senate against incumbent Democrat Birch Bayh. After the campaign, Daniels secured an internship in the office of then-Indianapolis mayor Richard Lugar, a Ruckelshaus ally. Daniels worked on Lugar's re-election campaign in 1971, and later, in 1974, he worked on Lugar's first campaign for Senate via L. Keith Bulen's Campaign Communicators, Inc, a political consultancy where Daniels served as vice president. Daniels joined Lugar's mayoral staff in December 1974. Within three years, he became Lugar's principal assistant. After Lugar was elected to the U.S. Senate in 1976, Daniels followed him to Washington, D.C., as his Chief of Staff.

Daniels served as Chief of Staff during Lugar's first term (1977–1982).

== Personal life ==
During Daniels' time working with Senator Lugar, he met Cheri Herman, who was working for the National Park Service. The two married in 1978 and had four daughters. They divorced in 1993 and Cheri married again; Cheri later divorced her second husband and remarried Daniels in 1997.

== Early career in Washington, D.C. ==
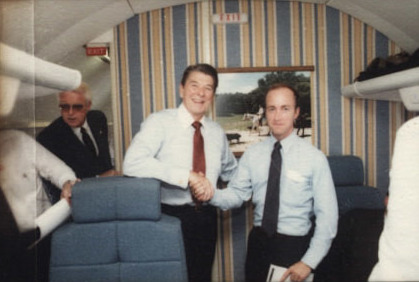
President Reagan with advisor Mitch Daniels on Air Force One in 1985.

In 1983, when Lugar was elected chairman of the National Republican Senatorial Committee, Daniels was appointed its executive director. Serving in that position (1983–84), he played a major role in keeping the GOP in control of the Senate. Daniels was also manager of three successful re-election campaigns for Lugar.

In August 1985, Daniels became chief political advisor and liaison to state and local governments for President Ronald Reagan.

As part of this position, Daniels led the Reagan administration's response to the Supreme Court's ruling in Garcia v. San Antonio Metropolitan Transit Authority, regarding the Fair Labor Standards Act, and advocated limiting the power of the federal government in defining overtime rules for state and local governments, summing up his position by asking "What business is it of the Federal Government to tell localities how to structure their personnel practices?".

While serving as the executive director of the Senate Republican campaign committee, Daniels expressed concern about the honesty of Illinois elections saying in 1984, "ballot integrity will be the single most decisive factor in the Illinois Senate race", a theme Daniels has returned to throughout his career.

== Return to Indiana ==
In 1987, Daniels returned to Indiana as president and CEO of the Hudson Institute, a conservative think tank. In 1988, Dan Quayle was elected Vice President of the United States, and Indiana governor Robert D. Orr offered to appoint Daniels to Quayle's vacant Senate seat. Daniels declined the offer, saying it would force him to spend too much time away from his family.

=== Eli Lilly ===
In 1990, Daniels left the Hudson Institute to accept a position at Eli Lilly and Company, the largest corporation headquartered in Indiana at that time. He was first promoted to President of North American Operations (1993–97) and then to Senior Vice President for Corporate Strategy and Policy (1997–2001).

The anti-depressant Prozac made up 30–40% of Lilly's income during the mid-to-late 1990s and Daniels managed the company’s strategy to deflect attacks on the drug. At the time, the Church of Scientology had launched a public relations campaign against Prozac, claiming it caused suicide. In one interview in 1992, Daniels said of the organization that "it is no church", and that people on Prozac were less likely to become victims of the organization. The Church of Scientology responded by suing Daniels in a libel suit for $20 million. A judge dismissed the case.

Eli Lilly experienced dramatic growth during Daniels's tenure at the company. Lilly doubled its assets to $12.8 billion and doubled its revenue to $10 billion during the same period. It also was subject to fines and lawsuits, paying more than $2.7 billion and setting more than 32,000 personal injury claims.

When Daniels later became governor of Indiana, he drew heavily on his former Lilly colleagues to serve as advisers and agency managers.

During the same period, Daniels also served on the board of directors of the Indianapolis Power & Light (IPL). He resigned from the IPL Board in 2001 to join the federal government, and sold his IPL stock along with all other holdings in order to comply with federal ethics requirements. Later that year the value declined when Virginia-based AES Corporation bought IPL.

== Office of Management and Budget ==
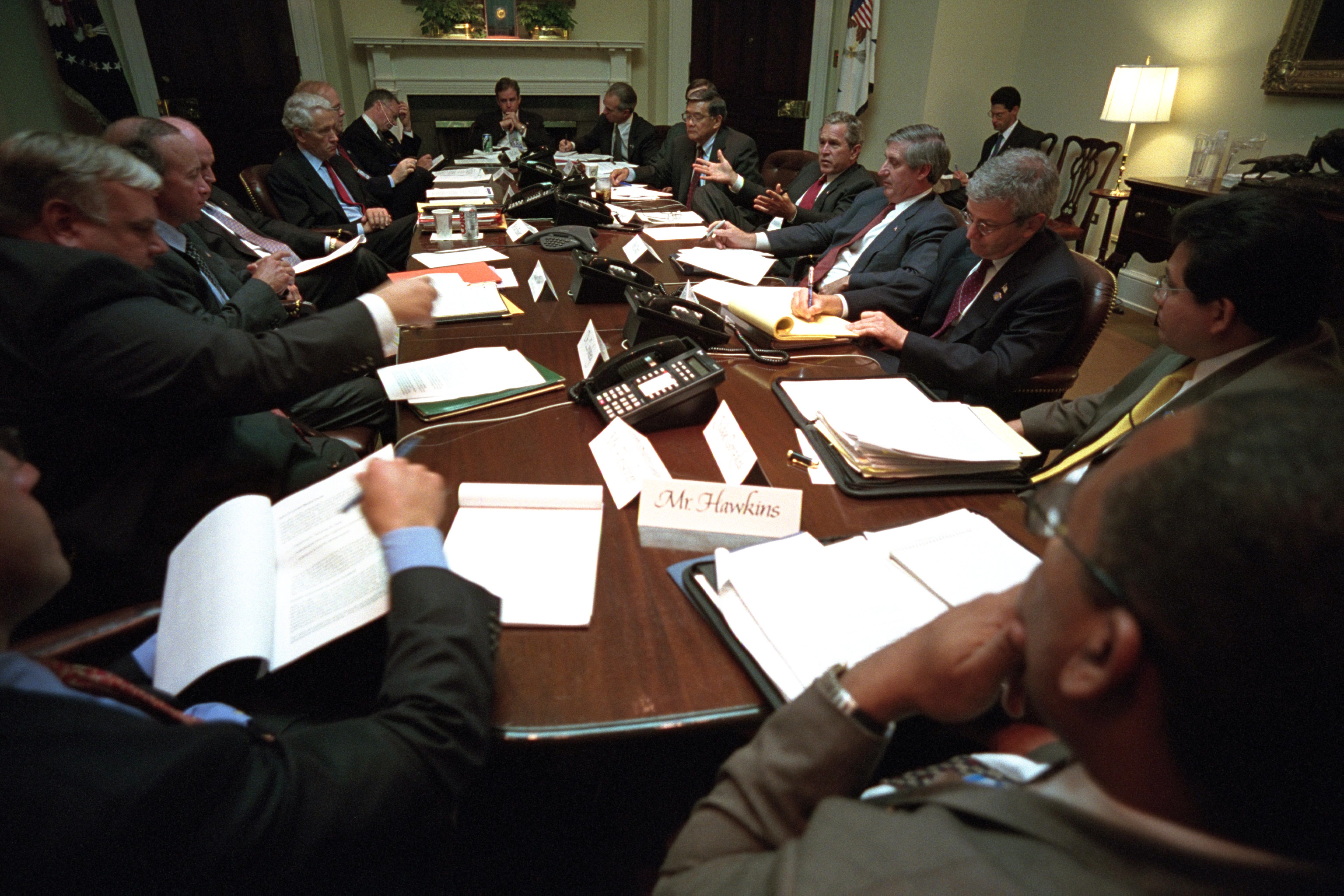
Daniels with President George W. Bush and other advisers in the Roosevelt Room in 2001

On December 22, 2000, President-elect George W. Bush announced that he would nominate Daniels to serve as the director of the Office of Management and Budget. The United States Senate confirmed him by a vote of 100–0 on January 23, 2001. In this role he was also a member of the United States National Security Council and the United States Homeland Security Council.

While director of the OMB, Daniels sought to restrict congressional spending, saying Congress's motto apparently is "Don't just stand there, spend something." This led to fights with both Republicans and Democrats. Senator Ted Stevens, then the ranking member of the United States Senate Committee on Appropriations, said that "the best thing Daniels could do to repair relations with Congress was to go back to Indiana". Representative Bill Young, then chairman of the United States House Committee on Appropriations, said, "I'm convinced the director of O.M.B. is only concerned about numbers ... and he has no concern about what those numbers do or do not do for the country, for our military, for our security." Then HHS Secretary Tommy Thompson complained that Daniels's office would reject a proposal "nine times out of 10, just to show you who the boss is". The $2.13 trillion budget Daniels submitted to Congress in 2001 would have made deep cuts in many agencies to accommodate the tax cuts being made, but few of the spending cuts were actually approved by Congress. Shortly after the invasion of Afghanistan, Daniels gave a speech to the National Press Club in which he challenged the view of those who wanted to continue typical spending while the nation was at war. "The idea of reallocating assets from less important to more important things, especially in a time of genuine emergency, makes common sense and is applied everywhere else in life," he said. Despite such efforts, during Daniels's 29-month tenure in the position, the projected federal budget surplus of $236 billion ballooned to a $400 billion deficit, due to the recession of 2001, tax cuts, the War in Afghanistan (2001–2021), and Iraq War.

Following the September 11, 2001 attacks, Congress passed legislation authorizing the creation of the Department of Homeland Security. Just before the legislation was signed by Bush, Republican lawmakers inserted language into the bill that authorized protection from liability corporations that manufactured thimerosal, a controversial vaccine preservative that has been the subject of multiple lawsuits. Eli Lilly was once the largest maker of thimerosal and is a major target of the lawsuits. Daniels was the budget director at the time of the bill's passing and some have raised concerns over potential conflicts of interest. Congress repealed the thimerosal provision following expressions of public displeasure.

Commentators like Nobel economics Laureate Paul Krugman and conservative columnist Ross Douthat questioned Daniels fiscal hawkishness due to his association with some of the "Bush administration's more egregious budgets" but Douthat also called Daniels "America's Best Governor" and defended him against accusations that he inaccurately assessed the costs of the Iraq war.

In 2002, Daniels helped discredit a report by Assistant to the President on Economic Policy Lawrence B. Lindsey estimating the cost of the Iraq War at between $100-$200 billion. Daniels called this estimate "very, very high" and stated that the costs would be between $50-$60 billion. At the time Daniels would not provide specific costs for either a long or a short military campaign against Saddam Hussein, saying the administration was budgeting for both. The failure to provide long term cost estimates led opponents to claim that Daniels and the administration had suggested the entire war would cost less than $60 billion. The CBO has estimated the total cost of the war in Iraq to U.S. taxpayers will be around $1.9 trillion if it was carried on until 2017.

Three months later, on March 25, 2003, five days after the start of the invasion, President Bush requested $53 billion through an emergency supplemental appropriation to cover operational expenses in Iraq until September 30 of that year. According to the Congressional Budget Office, Military operations in Iraq for 2003 cost $46 billion, less than the amount projected by Daniels and OMB. Douthat and other defenders of Daniels accuse Daniels's critics of mischaracterizing the six-month supplemental appropriation as a request to fund the entire war.

The costs of the Iraq war have exceeded $800 billion. Between September 2001 and October 2012, lawmakers appropriated about $1.4 trillion for operations in both the war in Iraq and Afghanistan.

On May 7, 2003, Daniels announced that he would resign as OMB director within 30 days in a move that Bush administration officials said was to prepare to run for governor of Indiana.

== Governor of Indiana (2005–2013) ==
=== Election campaign ===
Mitch Daniels 2004 campaign sign

Daniels's decision to run for Governor of Indiana led to most of the rest of Republican field of candidates dropping out of the race. The only challenger who did not do so was conservative activist and lobbyist Eric Miller. Miller worked for the Phoenix Group, a Christian rights defense group. Daniels's campaign platform centered on cutting the state budget and privatizing public agencies. He won the primary with 67% of the vote.

While campaigning in the general election, Daniels visited all 92 counties at least three times. He traveled in a donated white RV nicknamed "RV-1" and covered with signatures of supporters and his campaign slogan, "My Man Mitch". "My Man Mitch" was a reference to a phrase once used by President George W. Bush to refer to Daniels. Bush campaigned with Daniels on two occasions, as Daniels hoped that Bush's popularity would help him secure a win. In his many public stops, he frequently used the phrase "every garden needs weeding every sixteen years or so"; it had been 16 years since Indiana had had a Republican governor. His opponent in the general election was the incumbent, Joe Kernan, who had succeeded to the office upon the death of Frank O'Bannon. Campaign ads by Kernan and the Democratic Party attempted to tie Daniels to number of issues—his arrest for marijuana use; a stock sale leading to speculations of insider trading; and, because of his role at Eli Lilly, the high cost of prescription drugs. The 2004 election was the costliest in Indiana history, up until that time, with the candidates spending a combined US$23 million. Daniels won the election, garnering about 53% of the vote compared to Kernan's 45%. Kernan was the first incumbent governor to lose an election in Indiana since 1892.

=== First term ===
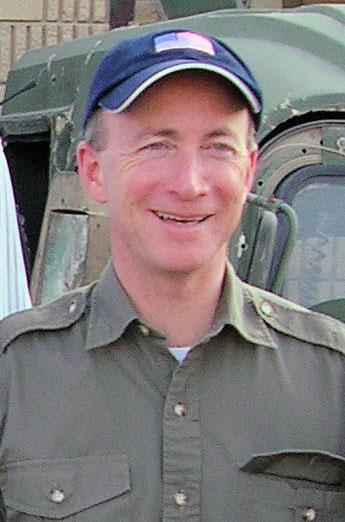
Daniels visiting Camp Arifjan in Kuwait

On his first day in office, Daniels created Indiana's first Office of Management and Budget to look for inefficiencies and cost savings throughout state government. The same day, he decertified all government employee unions by executive order, removing the requirement that state employees pay union dues by rescinding a mandate created by Governor Evan Bayh in a 1989 executive order. Dues-paying union membership subsequently dropped 90% among all state employees.

==== Budgetary measures ====
In his first State of the State address on January 18, 2005, Daniels put forward his agenda to improve the state's fiscal situation. Indiana has a biennial budget, and had a projected two-year deficit of $800 million. Daniels called for strict controls on all spending increases and reducing the annual growth rate of the budget. He also proposed a one-year 1% tax increase on all individuals and entities earning over $100,000. The taxing proposal was controversial and the Republican Speaker of the House, Brian Bosma, criticized Daniels and refused to allow the proposal to be debated.

The General Assembly approved $250 million in spending cuts and Daniels renegotiated 30 different state contracts for a savings of $190 million, resulting in a budget of $23 billion. Annual spending growth for future budgets was cut to 2.8% from the 5.9% that had been standard for many years. Increase in revenues, coupled with the spending reductions, led to a $300 million budget surplus. Indiana is not permitted to take loans, as borrowing was prohibited in its constitution following the 1837 state bankruptcy. The state, therefore, had financed its deficit spending by reallocating $760 million in revenue that belonged to local government and school districts over the course of many years. The funds were gradually and fully restored to the municipal governments using the surplus money, and the state reserve fund was grown to $1.3 billion.

Two of Daniels's other tax proposals were approved: a tax on liquor and beverages to fund the construction of the Lucas Oil Stadium and a tax on rental cars to expand the Indiana Convention Center. The new source of funding resulted in a state take-over of a project initially started by the city of Indianapolis and led to a bitter feud between Daniels and the city leadership over who should have ownership of the project. The state ultimately won and took ownership of the facilities from the city.

In 2006, Daniels continued his effort to reduce state operating costs by signing into law a bill privatizing the enrollment service for the state's welfare programs. Indiana's welfare enrollment facilities were replaced with call centers operated by IBM. In mid-2009, after complaints of poor service, Daniels canceled the contract and returned the enrollment service to the public sector.

==== Daylight Saving Time ====
One of the most controversial measures Daniels successfully pushed through was the state adoption of Daylight Saving Time, which Daniels argued, in a complicated economy, was needed to end constant confusion and bring Indiana into a year-long alignment with the rest of the country. Prior to the change, the counties in the western side of the state did not observe daylight saving time, although the counties in southeastern Indiana near Cincinnati, Ohio, did observe it unofficially due to being in that city's metropolitan area. Interests for both time zones had prevented the official adoption of daylight saving since the 1960s, leading to decades of debate. Daniels pressed for the entire state to switch to Central Time, but the General Assembly could not come to terms. Ultimately after a long debate, the General Assembly adopted Eastern Daylight Saving Time in April 2005. The measure passed by one vote and put most of the state on the Eastern Time Zone, except for counties in the northwest and southwest corners that are in the Central Time Zone.

==== Highways ====
In 2006 the legislature enacted Daniels' controversial plan to remake the state's highways system by leasing the Indiana Toll Road. Called the Major Moves, the road was leased to Statewide Mobility Partners, a joint venture company owned by Spanish firm Cintra and Australia's Macquarie Infrastructure Group for 75 years in exchange for a one time payment of $3.85 billion and the commitment to make $4.4 billion worth of upgrades to the road.

Daniels claimed that the road was not earning the state money because of the historical lack of political will to raise tolls. He told a congressional committee, "...instead of making money for the state, the road had operated at a loss for 5 of the previous 7 years...Political timidity had kept tolls locked at the same price since 1985...Even if we raised the tolls, there was little reason to believe that the governors who would come after me would have the inclination or the political ability to do the same. I once asked how much it cost to collect that 15-cent toll on the road and the answer came back at 34 cents. I joked that we would have been better off with the honor system and a fishbowl for occasional donations."

Daniels and an independent accounting firm believed the road was worth $2 billion at most and were surprised by the offer of nearly $4 billion in cash, plus that much in contracted improvements. Daniels called it the best deal since "Manhattan was sold for beads—except this time, the natives won."

Most Democrats opposed the measure and the party launched an advertising campaign accusing Daniels of selling the road to foreign nations. Initially, his support for the controversial legislation led to a rapid drop in his approval rating; in May 2005, a poll showed an 18-point drop in support and that only 42% of Hoosiers approved of the way he was doing his job. In the following months, many of his reforms appeared to have a positive effect and his approval ratings rebounded.

The income from the lease was used to finance a backlog of public transportation projects and create a $500 million trust fund to generate revenue for the maintenance of the highway system. Local governments also received a significant windfall from the deal, including $150 million that went to Indiana's 92 counties for local roads, $240 million to seven counties for infrastructure and economic development projects, and $120 million for the Northwest Regional Development Authority for local economic development. Over the next ten years, Indiana would use the cash and interest from the deal to add or expand several major new roadways such as US 31, the Hoosier Heartland Highway, I-69, and the Ohio River bridges. It also rehabilitated 1,400 bridges and 50% of the state's roads without using tax dollars or taking on new debt.

The contract prohibited toll increases until 2010 and allowed residents with a transponder to avoid paying the higher tolls until 2016. Annual toll increases were limited to the greater of 2%, the rate of inflation, or the rate of increase in the GDP.

The operator of the toll road filed for bankruptcy in 2014, citing lower than projected traffic volumes and revenues. Indiana retained the $3.85 billion lump sum payment and the lease was transferred to another Australian investment company without altering the terms of the lease.

==== Healthy Indiana Plan ====
In 2007, Daniels signed the Healthy Indiana Plan, which provided 132,000 uninsured Indiana workers with coverage. The program works by helping its beneficiaries purchase a private health insurance policy with a subsidy from the state. The plan promotes health screenings, early prevention services, and smoking cessation. It also provides tax credits for small businesses that create qualified wellness and Section 125 plans. The plan was paid for by an increase in the state's tax on cigarettes and the reallocation of federal Medicaid funds through a special waiver granted by the federal government. In a September 15, 2007, Wall Street Journal column, Daniels was quoted as saying about the Healthy Indiana Plan and cigarette tax increase saying, "A consumption tax on a product you'd just as soon have less of doesn't violate the rules I learned under Ronald Reagan."

The plan allows low to moderate income households where the members have no access to employer provided healthcare to apply for coverage. At the time of initial implementation, the fee for coverage was calculated using a formula that resulted in a charge between 2%–5% of a person's income. A $1,100 annual deductible was standard on all policies and allowed applicants to qualify for a health savings account. The plan paid a maximum of $300,000 in annual benefits.

==== Property tax reform ====
In 2008, Daniels proposed a property tax ceiling of one percent on residential properties, two percent for rental properties and three percent for businesses. The plan was approved by the Indiana General Assembly on March 14, 2008, and signed by Daniels on March 19, 2008. In 2008, Indiana homeowners had an average property tax cut of more than 30 percent; a total of $870 million in tax cuts. Most money collected through property taxes funds local schools and county government. To offset the loss in revenues to the municipal bodies, the state raised the sales tax from 6% to 7% effective April 1, 2008.

Fearing a future government might overturn the statute enforcing property tax rate caps, Daniels and other state Republican leaders pressed for an amendment to add the new tax limits to the state constitution. The proposed amendment was placed on the 2010 General election ballot and was a major focus of Daniels's reelection campaign. In November 2010, voters elected to adopt the tax caps into the Indiana Constitution.

Daniels's successes at balancing the state budget began to be recognized nationally near the end of his first term. Daniels was named on the 2008 "Public Officials of the Year" by the Governing magazine. The same year, he received the 2008 Urban Innovator Award from the Manhattan Institute for his ideas for dealing with the state's fiscal and urban problems.

==== Voter registration ====
In the 2005 session of the General Assembly, Daniels and Republicans, with some Democratic support, successfully enacted a voter registration law that required voters to show a government issued photo ID before they could be permitted to vote. The law was the first of its kind in the United States, and many civil rights organizations, including the ACLU, opposed the bill, saying it would unfairly impact minorities, poor, and elderly voters who might be unable to afford an ID or be physically unable to apply for an ID. To partially address those concerns, the state passed another law authorizing state license branches to offer free state photo ID cards to individuals who did not already possess another type of state ID.

A coalition of civil rights groups began a court challenge of the bill in Indiana state courts, and the Daniels administration defended the government in the case. The U.S. District Court granted summary judgment to the state. The petitioners appealed the bill to the United States Court of Appeals for the Seventh Circuit, and that body upheld the U.S. District Court decision in the case of Crawford v. Marion County Election Board. Upon appeal the United States Supreme Court also ruled in favor of the state in April 2008, setting a legal precedent. Several other states subsequently enacted similar laws in the years following.

=== Reelection campaign ===
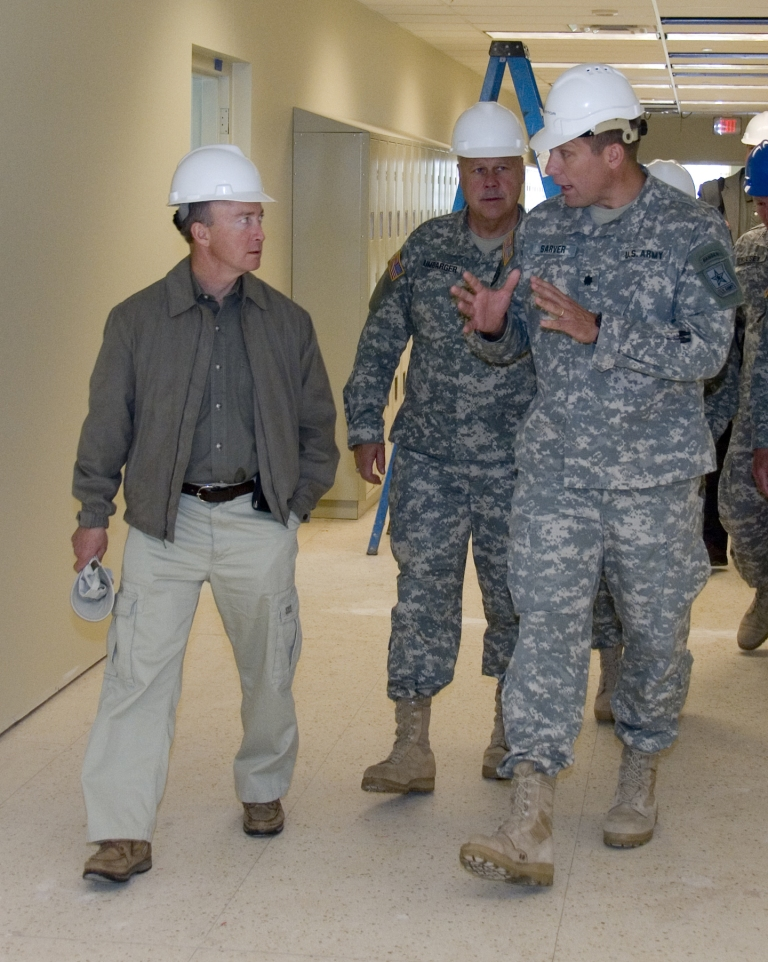
Mitch Daniels (left) talking to members of the Indiana National Guard.

Daniels entered the 2008 election year with a 51% approval rate, and 28% disapproval rate. Daniels's reelection campaign focused on the state's unemployment rate, which had decreased during his time in office, the proposed property tax reform amendment, and the successful balancing of the state budget during his first term.

On November 4, 2008, Daniels defeated Democratic candidate Jill Long Thompson and was elected to a second term as governor with 57.8% of votes, despite Barack Obama carrying the state in the presidential race. He was re-inaugurated on January 12, 2009. Washington Post blogger Chris Cillizza named the Daniels reelection campaign "The Best Gubernatorial Campaign of 2008" and noted that some Republicans were already bandying about his name for the 2012 presidential election. Daniels garnered 20 percent of the African American vote and 37 percent of Latinos in his 2008 re-election campaign. He won with more votes than any candidate in the state's history.

On July 14, 2010, at the Indianapolis Museum of Art, Daniels was on hand to help announce the return of IndyCar Series chassis manufacturing to the state of Indiana. Dallara Automobili would build a new technology center in Speedway, Indiana and the state of Indiana would subsidize the sale of the first 28 IndyCar chassis with a $150,000 discount.

Daniels has been recognized for his commitment to fiscal discipline. He is a recent recipient of the Herman Kahn Award from the Hudson Institute, of which he is a former president and CEO, and was one of the first to receive the Fiscy award for fiscal discipline. A November 2010 poll gave Daniels a 75% approval rate.

=== Second term ===
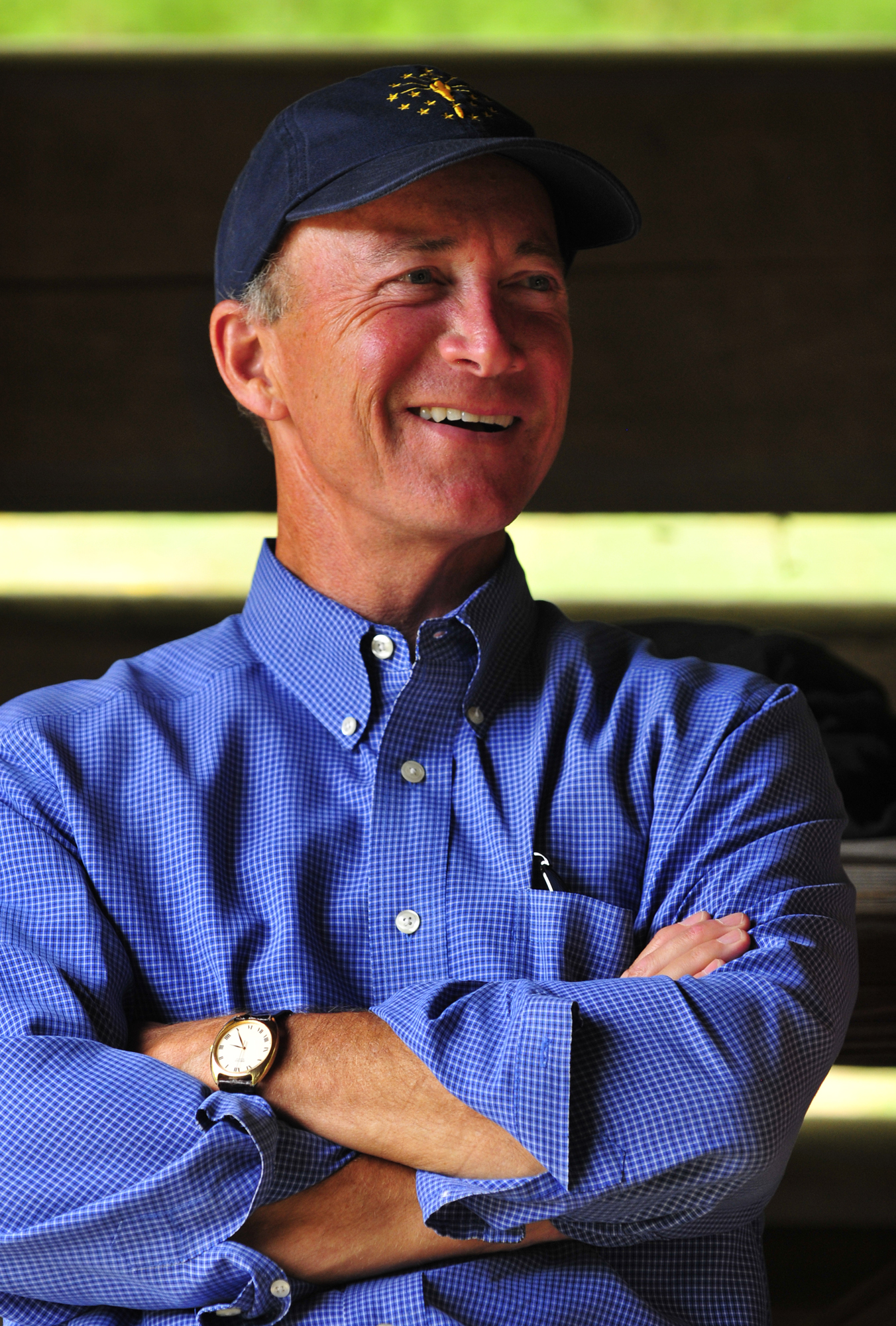
Daniels in August 2010

Democrats won a majority in the Indiana House of Representatives in the 2006 and 2008 elections, resulting in Indiana having a divided government, with Democrats controlling the Indiana House of Representatives and the Republicans controlling the governor's office and the Indiana Senate. This led to a stalemate in the budget debate, which caused Daniels to call a special session of the General Assembly. Due to the national financial crisis, the state was faced with a $1.4 billion shortfall in revenue for the 2009–2011 budget years. Daniels proposed a range of spending cuts and cost-saving measures in his budget proposal. The General Assembly approved some of his proposals, but relied heavily on the state's reserve funds to pay for the budget shortfall. Daniels signed the $27 billion two-year budget into law.

==== 2011 legislative walkout ====
In the 2010 mid-term elections, Republican super-majorities regained control of the House, and took control of the Senate, giving the party full control of General Assembly for the first time in Daniels's tenure as governor. The 2011 Indiana General Assembly's regular legislative session began in January and the large Republicans majorities attempted to implement a wide-ranging conservative agenda largely backed by Daniels. Most of the agenda had been dormant since Daniels's election due to divided control of the assembly. In February, Republican legislators attempted to pass a right to work bill in the Indiana House of Representatives. The bill would have made it illegal for employees to be required to join a workers' union. Republicans argued that it would help the state attract new employers. Unable to prevent the measure from passing, Democratic legislators fled the state to deny the body a quorum while several hundred protesters staged demonstrations at the capital. Minority walkouts are somewhat common in the state, occurring as recently as 2005.

While Daniels supported the legislation, he believed the Republican lawmakers should drop the bill because it was not part of their election platform and deserved a period of public debate. Republicans subsequently dropped the bill, but the Democratic lawmakers still refused to return to the capital, demanding additional bills be tabled, including a bill to create a statewide school voucher program. Their refusal to return left the Indiana General Assembly unable to pass any legislation, until three of the twelve bills they objected to were dropped from the agenda on March 28. The minority subsequently returned to the statehouse to resume their duties.

Daniels was interviewed in February 2011 about the similar 2011 Wisconsin budget protests in Madison. While supporting the Wisconsin Republicans, he said that in Indiana "we're not in quite the same position or advocating quite the same things they are up in Madison."

==== Education ====
Following the legislative walkouts, the assembly began passing most of the agenda and Daniels signed the bills into law. Written in collaboration with Indiana Superintendent of Public Instruction Tony Bennett, a series of education reform laws made a variety of major changes to statewide public schools. A statewide school voucher program was enacted. Children in homes with an income under $41,000 could receive vouchers equal to 90% of the cost of their public school tuition and use that money to attend a private school. It provides lesser benefits to households with income over $41,000. The program was gradually phased in over a three-year period and became available to all state residents by 2014.

Other funds were redirected to creating and expanding charter schools and expanding college scholarship programs. The law also created a merit pay system to give better performing teachers higher wages, gave broader authority to school superintendents to terminate the employment of teachers, and restricted the collective bargaining rights of teachers.

WGU Indiana was established through an executive order on June 14, 2010, by Daniels, as a partnership between the state and Western Governors University in an effort to expand access to higher education for Indiana residents and increase the percentage of the state's adult population with education beyond high school.

===== Attempt to remove Howard Zinn from Indiana's K-12 schools =====
In July 2013, the Associated Press obtained emails under Indiana open record laws in which Daniels asked for assurances that a textbook, The People's History of the United States, written by historian Howard Zinn "is not in use anywhere in Indiana". Daniels wrote in 2010, "This crap should not be accepted for any credit by the state." Daniels's e-mails were addressed to Scott Jenkins, his education adviser, and David Shane, a top fundraiser and state school board member. Daniels and his aides came to agreement and the governor wrote to them, "Go for it. Disqualify propaganda . ... " Part of Shane's input was that a statewide review "would force to daylight a lot of excrement". Though Teresa Lubbers, the state commissioner of higher education, was mentioned in the e-mails regarding the statewide review of courses, she later said that she "was never asked to conduct the survey of courses described in the e-mail exchanges, and that her office did not conduct such a survey".

In one of the emails, Daniels expressed contempt for Zinn upon his death:

This terrible anti-American academic has finally passed away ... The obits and commentaries mentioned his book, 'A People's History of the United States,' is the 'textbook of choice in high schools and colleges around the country.' It is a truly execrable, anti-factual piece of disinformation that misstates American history on every page. Can someone assure me that it is not in use anywhere in Indiana? If it is, how do we get rid of it before more young people are force-fed a totally false version of our history?

Three years later, in the wake of the revelations, 90 of Purdue's roughly 1,800 professors issued an open letter expressing their concern over Daniels's commitment to academic freedom. Daniels responded by saying that if Zinn were alive and a member of the Purdue faculty, he would defend his free speech rights and right to publish. In a letter responding to the professors, Daniels wrote, "In truth, my emails infringed on no one's academic freedom and proposed absolutely no censorship of any person or viewpoint."

In a separate and unrelated round of emails composed in 2009, Indiana education officials shared concerns with Daniels about the lobbying resources and activities of the Indiana Urban Schools Association. Daniels asked that the administration "examine cutting them out, at least of the [funding] 'surge' we are planning for the next couple yrs." The executive director of IUSA is Charles Little, an Indiana University-Purdue University Indianapolis professor of education, who had criticized him. It wasn't immediately clear if the audit went through. Daniels said he had never heard of Charles Little.

In response to the controversy, Daniels's office issued a statement that included several quotes that had also appeared in an article published in Reason magazine by journalist Michael Moynihan. as well as a quote from a Stanford University news release, leading to accusations of plagiarism.

Daniels later revised his statement stating he "axed the words of a Stanford University professor who expressed irritation with being included in the original remarks" while also removing the quotes that appeared in the Reason article.

==== Economy ====
Raising Hoosier incomes was a key focus of his tenure as governor. Critics argue that during his administration Indiana's per capita income dropped from 33rd to 38th among states, growing slightly slower than the national average, and the percentage of people living in poverty in Indiana rose from 10.2% to 14.9%. Supporters argue that economic progress was delayed by the Great Recession and when adjusted for Indiana's low cost of living, Hoosier incomes actually climbed following Daniels' leadership and Indiana rebounded from the recession faster than the rest of the nation in job growth and consumer spending.

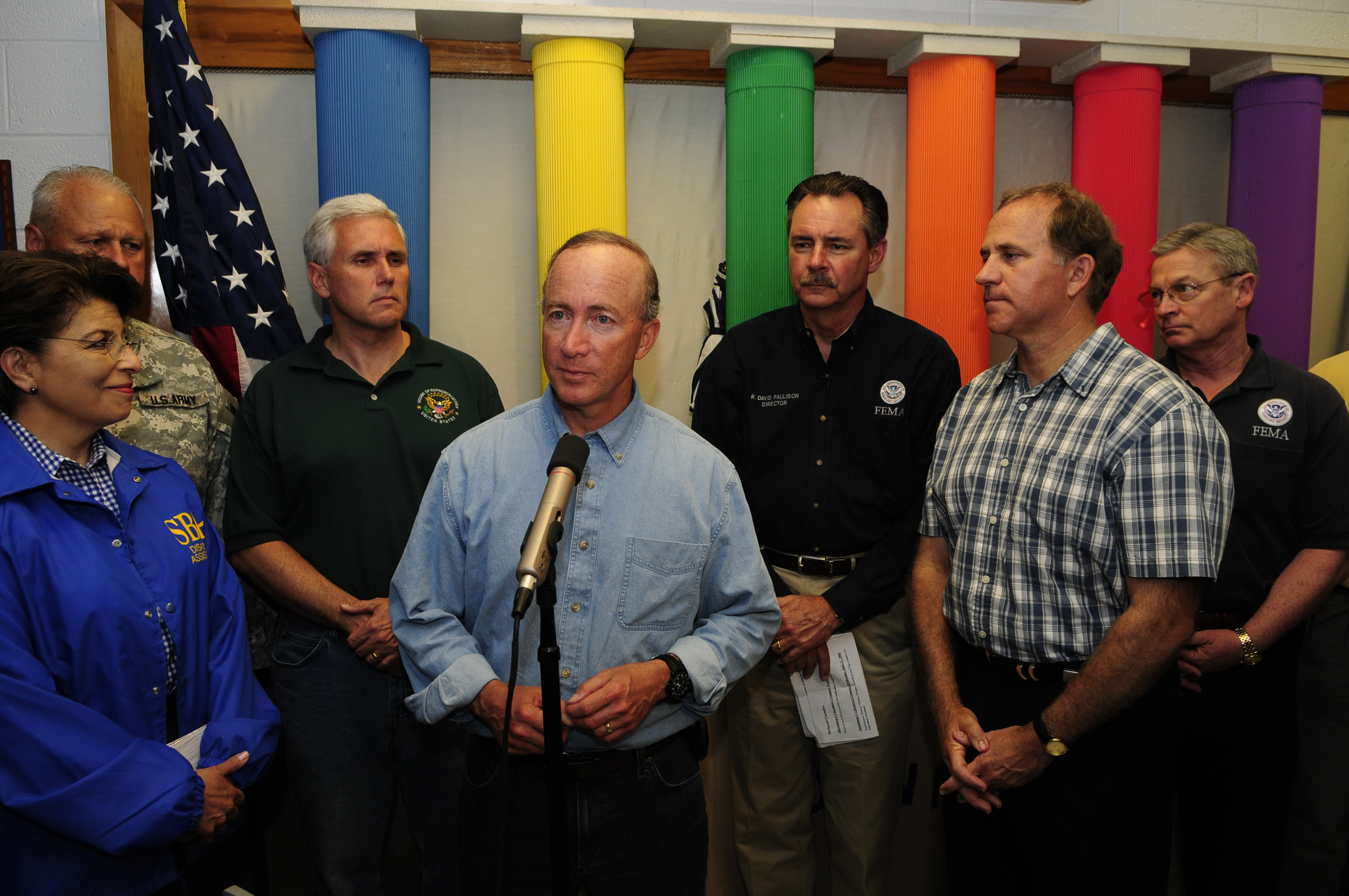
Governor Daniels addresses state and federal assistance available to tornado and flood victims with then Congressman Mike Pence, FEMA Administrator R. David Paulison

==== Abortion ====
On April 27, 2011, the Indiana legislature passed a bill authored by State Representative Eric Turner that prohibited taxpayer dollars from supporting organizations that performed abortions. The legislation also prohibited abortions for women more than 20 weeks pregnant, four weeks sooner than the previous law. Although Daniels would later say he supported the bill from the outset, it was not part of his legislative agenda and he did not indicate whether he would sign or veto the law until after it passed the General Assembly. Daniels signed the bill on May 10, 2011. Critics claimed Daniels signed the bill with full knowledge that he was "courting an expensive and time-consuming lawsuit" and "would threaten federal funds", specifically "the loss of $4 billion that funds its Medicaid program". The Centers for Medicare and Medicaid Services wrote in response "Indiana can either rethink its new law, or violate the Medicaid statute. It can't do both."

Planned Parenthood and the ACLU subsequently brought a lawsuit against the state alleging it was being targeted unfairly, that the state law violated federal Medicaid laws, and that their Fourteenth Amendment rights were violated. A June 24 ruling prohibited the state from enforcing the law and the court later ruled in favor of Planned Parenthood citing the "freedom of choice" provision. The State of Indiana appealed the ruling and the Seventh Circuit Court upheld the lower courts ruling in part.

==== Immigration ====
On May 10, 2011, Daniels signed into law two immigration bills; one denying in-state tuition prices to illegal immigrants and another one imposing fines for employers that employed illegal immigrants. Several protestors, at least five of whom were illegal immigrants, were arrested while protesting the law at the statehouse when they broke into Daniels's office after being denied a meeting. Student leaders called for their release, while some state legislators called for their deportation.

State Democratic Party leaders accused Daniels and the Republicans of passing controversial legislation only to enhance Daniels's image so he could seek the presidency. Daniels, however, denied the charges, saying he would have enacted the same agenda years earlier had the then-Democratic majority permitted him to do so.

==== Budget cuts ====
The state forecast continued revenue declines in 2010 that would result in a $1.7 billion budget shortfall if the state budget grew at its normal rate. Daniels submitted a two-year $27.5 billion spending plan to the General Assembly which would result in a $500 million surplus that would be used to rebuild the state reserve funds to $1 billion. He proposed a wide range of budget austerity measures, including employee furloughing, spending reductions, freezing state hiring, freezing state employee wages, and a host of administrative changes for state agencies. The state had already been gradually reducing its workforce by similar freezes, and by 2011, Indiana had the fewest state employees per capita of any state—a figure Daniels touted to say Indiana had the nation's smallest government.

Daniels backed the creation of additional toll roads, expanding on his 2006 overhaul of the Indiana Toll Road system (known as "Major Moves"), in an attempt to secure an additional source of revenue for the state. But opposition from within his own party led to the bill being withdrawn by its Republican sponsor, Sen. Tom Wyss, Daniels's only significant legislative defeat during the 2011 session.

The legislative walkouts delayed progress on the budget passage for nearly two months, but the House of Representatives was able to begin working on it in committee in April. The body made several alterations to the bill, including a reapportionment of education funding based more heavily on the number of students at a school, and removing some public school funding to finance the new voucher system and charter schools.

==== Energy ====
Daniels announced in October 2006 that a substitute natural gas company intended to build a facility in southern Indiana that would produce pipeline quality substitute natural gas (SNG). The lead investor was Leucadia National, which proposed a $2.6 billion plant in Rockport, Indiana. Under the terms of the deal endorsed by Daniels, the state would buy almost all the Rockport gas and resell it on the open market throughout the country. If the plant made money from the sale, excess profits would be split between Leucadia National's Indiana subsidiary, Indiana Gassification, and the state. If it lost money from the sale, then 100% of the losses would be passed onto Indiana consumers. Leucadia agreed to reimburse the state for any losses, up to $150 million over 30 years. Gas from the plant would make up about 17 percent of the state's supply. Critics feared that if gas prices fell over the next 30 years, the costs of the lost profits would be passed onto the bills of residents after the $150 million guarantee by Leucadia was exhausted. The deal also received criticism concerning government intrusion in the energy markets. Questions were also raised because Leucadia National hired Mark Lubbers, a former aide and close friend of Daniels, to promote the deal. The Daniels administration maintained that the plant would create jobs in an economically depressed part of the state and offer environmental benefits through an in-state energy source. The project was ultimately rejected by the state legislature in 2013.

==== Right to Work ====
Indiana became the first state in a decade to adopt Right to Work legislation. Indiana is home to many manufacturing jobs. The Indiana Economic Development Corp. has reported that 90 firms said the new law was an important factor in deciding to move to Indiana. Daniels signed the legislation on February 1, 2012, without much fanfare in the hopes of dispersing labor protesters before the Super Bowl in Indianapolis.

== Presidential Speculation ==
=== 2012 Presidential speculation ===
Although Daniels had claimed to be reluctant to seek higher office, many media outlets, including Politico, The Weekly Standard, Forbes, The Washington Post, CNN, The Economist, and The Indianapolis Star began to speculate that Daniels intended to seek the Republican nomination for president in 2012 after he joined the national debate on cap and trade legislation by penning a response in The Wall Street Journal to policies espoused by the Democratic-majority Congress and the White House in August 2010. The speculation included Daniels's record of reforming government, reducing taxes, balancing the budget, and connecting with voters in Indiana. Despite his signing into law of bills that toughened drug enforcement, regulated abortion, and a defense of marriage act, he angered some conservatives because of his call for a "truce" on social issues so the party could focus on fiscal issues. His "willingness to consider tax increases to rectify a budget deficit" was another source of contention.

In August 2010, The Economist praised Daniels's "reverence for restraint and efficacy" and concluded that "he is, in short, just the kind of man to relish fixing a broken state—or country." Nick Gillespie of Reason called Daniels "a smart and effective leader who is a serious thinker about history, politics, and policy", and wrote that "Daniels, like former New Mexico Gov. Gary Johnson, is a Republican who knows how to govern and can do it well." In February 2011, David Brooks of The New York Times described Daniels as the "Party's strongest [would be] candidate", predicting that he "couldn't match Obama in grace and elegance, but he could on substance."

On December 12, 2010, Daniels suggested in a local interview that he would decide on a White House run before May 2011.

Various groups and individuals pressured Daniels to run for office. In response to early speculation, Daniels dismissed a presidential run in June 2009, saying "I've only ever run for or held one office. It's the last one I'm going to hold." However, in February 2010 he told a Washington Post reporter that he was open to the idea of running in 2012.

On March 6, 2011, Daniels was the winner of an Oregon (Republican Party) straw poll. Daniels drew 29.33% of the vote, besting second place finisher Mitt Romney (22.66%) and third place finisher Sarah Palin (18.22%), and was the winner of a similar straw poll in the state of Washington. On May 5, 2011, Daniels told an interviewer that he would announce "within weeks" his decision of whether or not to run for the Republican presidential nomination. He said he felt he was not prepared to debate on all the national issues, such as foreign policy, and needed time to better understand the issues and put together formal positions. Later in May, as the Republican field began to resolve with announcements and withdrawals of other candidates, Time said, "Even setting aside his somewhat unusual family situation, Daniels would need to hurry to put together an organization" and raise enough money if he intended to run.

Daniels announced he would not seek the Republican nomination for the presidency on the night of May 21, 2011, via an email to the press, citing family constraints and the loss of privacy the family would experience should he become a candidate. In 2021 it was alleged by Max Eden, who led the Draft Daniels Student Group which provided much of the pressure for Daniels to run, that potentially damaging information was being held by some members of the Jon Huntsman campaign, chiefly John Weaver, the political advisor of the Huntsman campaign, regarding Daniels's wife. Eden also stated that Weaver had contacted him about a "seat at the table" of the Huntsman campaign, and further went on to state that Huntsman, then a potential top candidate for the Republican nomination, was himself unaware of Weaver's actions. Eden stated that the potential backlash from Weaver's information was a large contributor to Daniels's decision not to seek the Republican nomination, among other privacy concerns.

=== 2016 presidential speculation ===
In January 2014, the Republican National Committee sent an email to subscribers, asking them to pick their top three presidential choices. The poll included 32 potential candidates, including Daniels. In March 2015, Fortune Magazine named Daniels No. 41 on its list of the world's 50 greatest leaders, generating a new round of calls for Daniels to consider his options in 2016. Daniels was the only American university president and one of two national political figures to make the global list.

== President of Purdue University ==
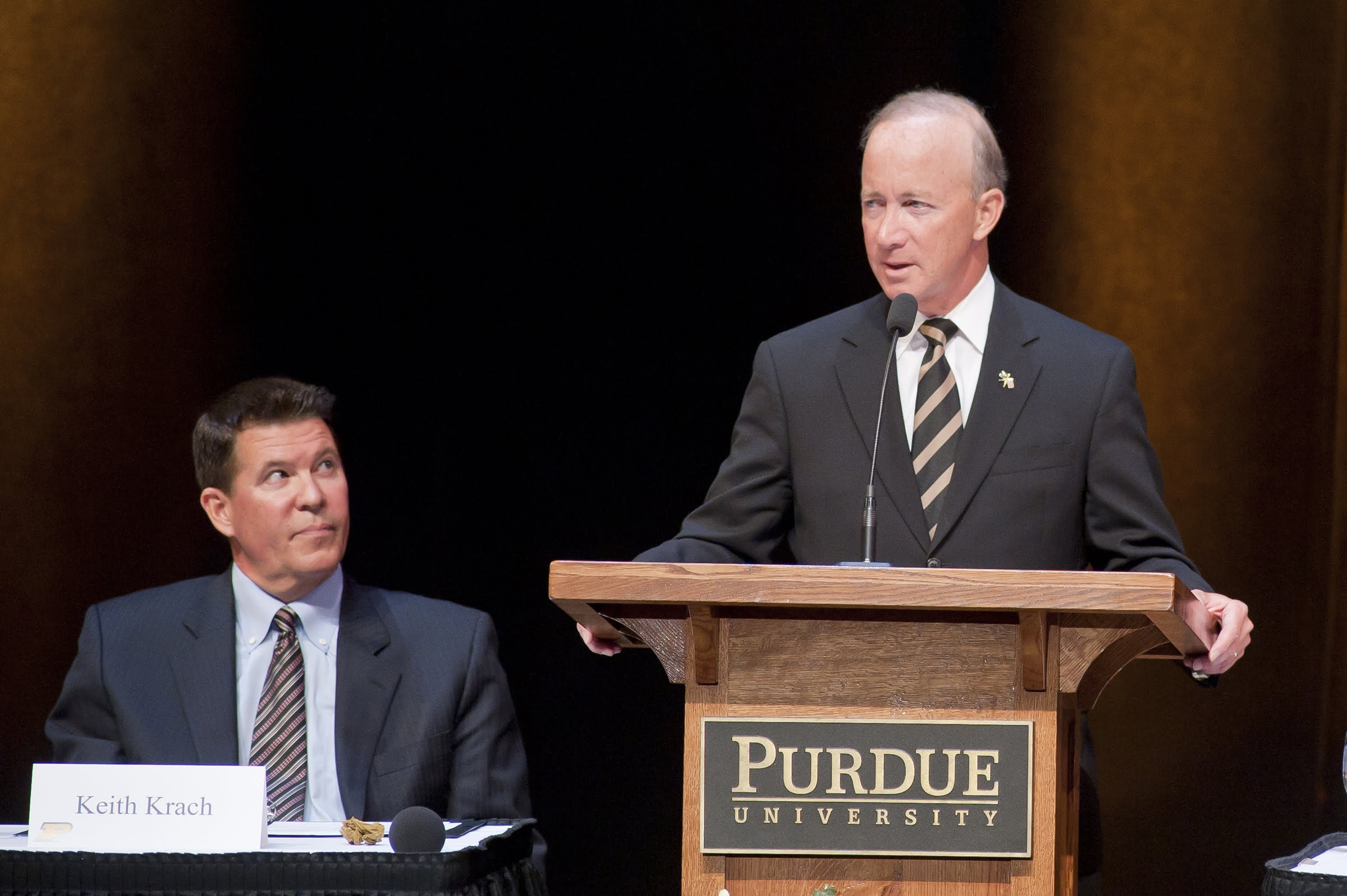
Mitch Daniels after being named the university's 12th president in 2012.

=== Controversy over Selection ===
As Daniels' second term as governor neared an end, a search committee recommended Daniels to the Purdue University Board of Trustees as a candidate to become the university's 12th president. The committee was composed of 14 individuals: 5 members of the faculty, 3 administrators, 4 trustees, a student government leader and William Funk, the CEO of an executive search firm that has recruited hundreds of university presidents. Daniels' selection had the "full endorsement of the search committee" when on June 21, 2012, the Board unanimously elected Daniels to the position.

As governor, Daniels had appointed eight of the ten board members and had reappointed the other two, which critics claimed was a conflict of interest. A state investigation released in October 2012 found that the circumstances did not violate the Indiana Code of Ethics. Other critics of his selection pointed out that, unlike all previous Purdue presidents, he lacked experience in academia. His term as president began upon completion of his term as governor in January 2013. In preparation for his term as President of Purdue University, Daniels stopped participating in partisan political activity during the 2012 election cycle and focused instead on issues related to higher education and fiscal matters.

Stating his desire to avoid the financial cost of a formal inauguration, Daniels instead wrote an "Open Letter to the People of Purdue" in which he documented the challenges facing higher education and outlined his initial priorities such as affordability, academic excellence and academic freedom. Daniels has continued this practice, opting to send Open Letters to the Purdue community instead of giving a formal State of the University speech, as is more common in higher education.

=== Student interactions ===
Daniels consistently argued that his top priority as president was students such as in 2020 when he said: "We are only here, all of us, because of students, and to imagine that that is not our driving priority is a serious confusion..."

Daniels worked out most days at the student gym and ate frequently with students in dining facilities and Greek houses. In March 2013, he joined forces with a group of engineering students to create a viral music video promoting engineering and Purdue University. Within 24 hours, the video had received over 50,000 views.

Purdue home football games featured a segment entitled "Where's Mitch?", in which, the stadium video board showed the camera panning the crowd and eventually finding Daniels sitting among the fans, sometimes in the student section. Former Purdue presidents rarely left their suite in the press-box structure. In April 2019, Daniels received a T-shirt gun for his birthday that he used to shoot t-shirts with his printed picture into the student section during home basketball games.

At the Spring 2021 Commencement, Daniels rode into the Purdue Football Stadium on a couch car designed by Purdue students that was often spotted on campus during that academic year.

=== Purdue Polytechnic Indianapolis high school ===
In 2015, Daniels announced plans to open the Purdue Polytechnic Indianapolis high school, designed to be a bridge for inner-city students to Purdue by admitting graduates directly to Purdue. Daniels described the high school as an attempt to increase the number of low-income, first-generation, and minority students who are prepared for Purdue.

Purdue now operates three such high schools but as of summer 2021, only one school had existed long enough to graduate a class of seniors. Of that class, forty students were admitted to Purdue for fall 2021, more than double the average of 15 who attend Purdue from Indianapolis Public Schools.

=== Racial equity and handling of racist incidents ===
Daniels has been criticized by student groups and faculty for his unwillingness to take stronger stances on public displays of white supremacy on campus. In November 2016, posters appeared on campus with drawings of white people with sayings such as "We have a right to exist," and "Defending your people is a social duty, not an anti-social crime." Daniels called the posters, left by a racist organization, a "transparent effort to bait people into overreacting, thereby giving a minuscule fringe group attention it does not deserve, and that we decline to do". He also noted that the views of the organization behind the posters "are obviously inconsistent with the values and principles we believe in here at Purdue." In January 2017, students staged a sit-in of Hovde Hall, where Daniels's office is located. The occupation continued for 91 days. During that time, Daniels refused to meet the students.

In 2019, Daniels met with Purdue student government leaders to discuss a controversy surrounding a Purdue student who was unable to buy cold medicine when an off-campus CVS clerk did not accept his Puerto Rican driver's license as valid. Following the scheduled meeting, Daniels had an impromptu 30-minute meeting with student activists who had various concerns about diversity at Purdue. At one point in the conversation, Daniels described his ongoing efforts to recruit an African American faculty member by calling the individual "one of the rarest creatures in America—a leading, I mean a really leading, African-American scholar". The University Senate's Equity and Diversity Committee issued a statement calling Daniels's phrasing "problematic" stating, "The idea that there is a scarcity of leading African American scholars is simply not true". In a New York Times op-ed, G. Gabrielle Starr, president of Pomona College, wrote, "In just a few sentences, Mr. Daniels seemed to question the possibility of sustained black excellence". Following the criticism, Daniels issued an apology. "I retract and apologize for a figure of speech I used in a recent impromptu dialogue with students ... The word in question was ill chosen and imprecise".

In June 2020, as the Black Lives Matter movement gained national momentum, Daniels endorsed the creation of a university system-wide task force to examine racial inequality in response to the murder of George Floyd and other incidents of racial injustice. The task force resulted in the inclusion of racial equity as one of five goals in Purdue's $260 million strategic plan update. As of May 2021, Daniels had helped Purdue raise $27 million for minority scholarship and recruitment efforts in that year, an increase of about 15% over the previous year.

Each fall, Daniels sends a message to the entire campus stating that "Racism, anti-Semitism, bigotry, and violence ... are the antithesis of [our] values and have no place on our campus." The message also states that the university will "protect and promote the right to free and open inquiry". As president, Daniels has made the defense of free expression a priority by becoming the first public institution to adopt the Chicago principles for free speech and inquiry and one of roughly two dozen universities to receive the highest rating from the Foundation for Individual Rights in Education.

=== Tuition freezes and cost reductions ===
Tuition at Purdue, prior to Daniels' arrival, had increased every year since 1976. Two months after Daniels assumed his role as president, Purdue announced it would freeze tuition for two years, eventually extending the freeze for ten years, through 2023. As a result, multiple graduating classes will leave Purdue having never experienced a tuition increase. Annual student borrowing is down a third and the Purdue loan default rate is 2.2% versus 7.1% for the average borrower from a four-year public university and 5.1% for Purdue borrowers prior to the tuition freeze. The university claims that students and families will have saved over a billion dollars over the course of the ten years. No student fees have been approved since the tuition freeze was enacted, although a mandatory student wellness fee that students lobbied for prior to Daniels' arrival at Purdue was allowed to take effect but was later reduced under Daniels' direction. The total cost of attending Purdue has fallen since Daniels assumed Purdue's presidency. However, revenue per student increased modestly despite the freeze, partially because the number of foreign and out-of-state students increased, most significantly among graduate students.

Daniels announced the first tuition freeze before the state had determined Purdue's funding for the next biennium. Amidst questions about the timing, Daniels argued that he didn't need to wait because "it doesn't matter what the General Assembly does. This is the right thing to do and we are going to do it" The first tuition freeze required the university to find $40 million in savings or new revenue. In order to make up for the lost revenue from tuition freezes, Daniels and the Purdue Board of Trustees focused on finding operating efficiencies such as consolidating information technology data centers, investing cash reserves, and switching to a consumer-driven health plan for employees.

Daniels also reduced meal plan rates for students by 10 percent, froze housing costs, and cut the university's cooperative education fees which had previously increased every year. Due to the adjustments, the average cost of room and board at Purdue declined from the second most expensive to the most affordable in the Big Ten.

In fall 2014, Daniels announced a deal with Amazon to save students on textbooks and provide students, faculty and staff with free one day shipping to locations on campus. The partnership was ended by Amazon in 2018 but the on campus stores remain in place.

=== Purdue Moves initiatives ===
In September 2013, Daniels announced the first major priorities of his administration, known as "Purdue Moves". The plan continued Daniels' focus on affordability but also called for new investments such as the hiring of 165 new faculty in STEM disciplines, expansion of flipped classrooms, growing summer enrollment, investments in plant science and drug discovery research, and the creation of competency-based degree programs and some three-year degree options. The Purdue Moves also emphasized commercialization of research. Under Daniels' leadership, Purdue increased the number of affiliated start-up companies by more than 400 percent and broke the university record for patents.

In 2021, Daniels announced an expansion of the original moves called "Next Moves".

=== Response to COVID-19 ===
Daniels announced in April 2020 that Purdue intended to welcome students back on campus in the fall, becoming one of the earliest university leaders to do so, saying it would be an "unacceptable breach of duty" to not reopen. Daniels released a plan called Protect Purdue that was designed to protect the most vulnerable of Purdue's campus from the disease by relying on masking, contact tracing, facility modifications, and a student pledge.

Some faculty objected to Daniels efforts to reopen while others worked with the administration, lending their expertise to craft the plan. In May 2020, while on CNN, Daniels dismissed the criticisms of a tenured engineering education professor, saying she represented a "very tiny minority view" ... "Frankly, not from the most scientifically-credible corner of our very STEM-based campus". The American Society for Engineering Education responded to the remarks asking Daniels if he "meant to cast doubt on the academic integrity of Dr. Pawley", "cast doubt on the value of the School of Engineering Education, the first such department in the nation, recognized internationally", or "to cast aspersions on the entire College of Engineering and its globally recognized research, innovative instruction, and respected faculty and alumni".

Throughout the 2020–21 academic year, Daniels and Purdue claimed that Purdue offered as much in-person instruction as any university its size. The university conducted 212,456 COVID tests and had 6,158 positive tests among employees and students with 99% having no worse than moderate symptoms but 14 being hospitalized.

=== Acquisition of Kaplan and launch of Purdue Global ===
In 2017, Daniels and the Purdue Board of Trustees announced the intention to acquire Kaplan University for the purpose of transforming it into an online, self-sustaining, public benefit corporation, now rebranded as Purdue University Global. The acquisition was met with both considerable praise and significant criticism. Among those who expressed favor before the deal closed included Barack Obama's Secretary of Education Arne Duncan and Ted Mitchell, who led Obama's crackdown on for-profit universities.

Among the critics of the acquisition were Purdue faculty. At the time, the Purdue University Senate called the deal a "violation of common-sense educational practice". In May 2017, the Purdue University Senate passed a resolution condemning the deal between Kaplan Higher Education and Purdue University. In September 2017, U.S. Senators Dick Durbin (D-IL) and Sherrod Brown (D-OH) warned that Purdue's acquisition of Kaplan University posed major risks for Purdue University's students and reputation. They added that Kaplan has a "shameful record" as a "predatory" school.

Following the immediate controversy, leaders of the university senate appeared to soften their tone with the next chair of the senate saying she was "giving Purdue Global the benefit of the doubt" and sees Global as an extension of Purdue's land grant mission "without spending $50 million building a new building to house students 10 years from now". The co-chair of the Select Committee on Global said in January 2020, "it's more a wait-and-see kind of thing".

Enrollment has grown at Purdue Global since its launch.

=== Compensation ===
When Daniels was hired by Purdue, he requested that his salary be less than his predecessor's maximum salary and that 30 percent of his compensation be placed "at-risk" and only awarded if he reached performance metrics established by the trustees.

Under his first contract, Daniels' earned a guaranteed salary of $420,000 which was $135,000 less than the prior president's salary. That year Daniels also earned another $113,000 for reaching 88% of the Trustees performance metrics meaning he was paid about $22,000 less than his predecessor.

Although Daniels' guaranteed base pay would never climb higher than $435,000, the amount available to be earned through performance metrics increased over the years and the trustees occasionally gave him a retention bonus that reached as high as $250,000 to try and keep him at Purdue. In Daniels final year at Purdue, he earned his guaranteed base of $430,000, plus another $210,700 for earning 98% of his at risk pay.

His total compensation over the years was $530,880 in 2014, $533,400 in 2015, $721,600 in 2016, $769,500 in 2017, $830,000 in 2018, $902,207 in 2019, $922,000 in 2020, $663,000 in 2021 and $640,700 in 2022.

=== End of Presidency ===
Daniels was replaced by Dr. Mung Chiang as President of Purdue University effective January 1, 2023.

As Daniels left Purdue, he openly explored a run for the U.S. Senate but ultimately declined, saying in a statement, "it's just not the job for me, not the town for me, and not the life I want to live at this point ... some people seek public office to be something, others to do something. My one tour of duty in elected office involved, like those in business before and academe after it, an action job, with at least the chance to do useful things every day. I have never imagined that I would be well-suited to legislative office, particularly where seniority remains a significant factor in one's effectiveness, and I saw nothing in my recent explorations that altered that view."

One month after Daniels's departure from Purdue, the university's trustees named the business school the Mitchell E. Daniels, Jr. School of Business. The trustees had previously announced that State Street, a major campus corridor Daniels renovated, would be named Mitch Daniels Boulevard. That announcement was made at street festival in which hundreds waited to greet Daniels and bid him farewell.

Following Daniels' departure, Purdue University was named the best managed university in the world by the Canadian firm Organizational Excellence Specialists with the report claiming, "Under Mitch Daniels’ leadership, Purdue pioneered fiscal accountability while improving public confidence in higher education."

=== Return as interim president ===
On May 25, 2026, the Purdue University Board of Trustees approved Daniels's appointment as interim president, effective July 1, 2026, following Mung Chiang's departure to become president of Northwestern University. Daniels agreed to serve while the university conducts a national search for its next president.

== Board service ==
In February 2013, Daniels was asked to co-chair a National Research Council committee to review and make recommendations on the future of the U.S. human spaceflight program. Daniels also co-chairs a Council on Foreign Relations Task Force on NonCommunicable diseases. In March 2013, Daniels was elected to the board of Energy Systems Network (ESN), Indiana's industry-driven clean technology initiative.

In June 2015, Daniels was elected to serve on the board of directors for Indiana software company Interactive Intelligence (ININ) until its sale to Genesys. In July 2015, Daniels became a co-chair of the Committee for a Responsible Federal Budget.

In November 2016, Daniels was elected to serve on the board of directors for Norfolk Southern Corporation.

Daniels serves as a founding board member for National Resilience, a biotechnology company launched in November 2020.

In February, 2025, Daniels was named as a board member of Liberty Fund a private education foundation headquartered in Carmel, Indiana. That same month he joined Indianapolis-based LDI Ltd. as an executive partner.

== Electoral history ==
Indiana gubernatorial election, 2004
Party	Candidate	Votes	%	±%
Republican	Mitch Daniels	1,302,912	53.2	
Democratic	Joe Kernan (Incumbent)	1,113,900	45.5	
Libertarian	Kenn Gividen	31,664	1.3	

Indiana gubernatorial election, 2008
Party	Candidate	Votes	%	±%
Republican	Mitch Daniels (Incumbent)	1,542,371	57.8	
Democratic	Jill Long Thompson	1,067,863	40.1	
Libertarian	Andy Horning	56,651	2.1	

== Authorship ==
- Daniels, Mitch (2004), Notes from the Road: 16 months of towns, tales and tenderloins, Mitch Daniels Transition Team, ISBN 978-0976602606
- Daniels, Mitch (2011), Keeping the Republic: Saving America by Trusting Americans, Sentinel, ISBN 978-1595230805
- Daniels, Mitch (2012), Aiming Higher: Words That Changed a State, IBJ Book Publishing, ISBN 978-1934922866
- Daniels, Mitch (2023), Boiler Up: A University President in the Public Square, Purdue University Press, ISBN 978-1612499369
- Daniels, Mitchell Elias (2026), Impatience is a virtue: a life where the buck stops, Essex, Connecticut: Lyons Press, ISBN 978-1-4930-9612-1

== Honors ==
- Woodrow Wilson Award, Princeton University (2013)
- Bradley Prize, Bradley Foundation, (2013)
- World's Greatest Leaders, No. 41 Fortune Magazine (2015)
- Order of the Rising Sun, 2nd Class, Gold and Silver Star (2017)
- Gerald R. Ford Medal for Distinguished Public Service, Gerald R. Ford Presidential Foundation (2024)
- Theodore Roosevelt Distinguished Service Medal, Theodore Roosevelt Association (2024)

== See also ==
- List of governors of Indiana

Political offices
Preceded by Lee Verstandig	Director of the White House Office of Intergovernmental Affairs; 1985; Served alongside: Ed Rollins (Political and Intergovernmental Affairs)	Succeeded by Deborah Steelman
Preceded by Ed Rollins	White House Director of Political and Intergovernmental Affairs; 1985–1987; Served alongside: Bill Lacy, Haley Barbour (Political Affairs); Deborah Steelman, Gwendolyn King (Intergovernmental Affairs)	Succeeded by Frank Donatelli
Preceded by Jack Lew	Director of the Office of Management and Budget; 2001–2003	Succeeded by Joshua Bolten
Preceded by Joe Kernan	Governor of Indiana; 2005–2013	Succeeded by Mike Pence
Party political offices
Preceded by David McIntosh	Republican nominee for Governor of Indiana; 2004, 2008	Succeeded by Mike Pence
Preceded by Paul Ryan	Response to the State of the Union address 2012	Succeeded by Marco Rubio
Academic offices
Preceded by Timothy Sands; Acting	President of the Purdue University System; 2013–2022	Succeeded by Mung Chiang
Preceded by Mung Chiang	President of the Purdue University System; Acting; 2026–present	Incumbent
U.S. order of precedence (ceremonial)
Preceded by Martha McSally as Former Senator	Order of precedence of the United States; Within Indiana	Succeeded by Eric Holcomb as Former Governor
Preceded by John Bel Edwards as Former Governor	Order of precedence of the United States; Outside Indiana	Succeeded by Eric Holcomb as Former Governor
