= Advance America (advocacy group) =

Conservative political advocacy group in Indiana

Advance America (formerly Citizens Concerned for the Constitution) was a conservative political advocacy group in the U.S. state of Indiana. Advance America claimed that it was a "non-partisan tax exempt, educational organization." It claimed affiliation with approximately 4,000 Indiana churches, nearly one third of all churches in the state of Indiana.

In October 2023, Eric Miller announced that Advance America would cease operations by the end of the year.

== History and governance ==
Advance America was founded in 1980 by Eric Miller, an attorney from Indianapolis, with the help of ten other people. It was originally called "Citizens Concerned for the Constitution". It shared space and employees with Miller's law office. It was governed by a seven-member board of directors consisting entirely of pastors.

== Activities ==
Advance America published an annual voter's guide informing voters of the stance of various candidates for local office on issues Advance America was concerned about. These voter guides were distributed primarily through mail, e-mail, and churches.

Advance America attempted to keep people informed about what bills and issues the state legislature was considering through mailings, e-mails, voting record summaries, pastor and citizen briefings, and speaking engagements (frequently in churches).

Advance America claimed that their staff reviewed each bill to come before the state legislature. They testified before legislative committees, talked to legislators, drafted amendments and bills, and mobilized the public to contact legislators.

== Issues ==
Advance America regularly campaigned for issues that they perceived to affect the family and religious freedom. They supported the controversial Indiana Religious Freedom Restoration Act as well as pushed to uphold the state's same sex marriage ban. They opposed legislation permitting transgender persons to use the bathroom of their choice. They opposed extending regulations on daycares to include those daycares run by churches. They supported legislation mandating public schools to display a poster in each classroom prominently displaying the United States national motto "In God We Trust".

In 2019, on the one-year anniversary of the Stoneman Douglas High School shooting, Indiana passed a bill providing mental health funding to schools. Advance America pushed for an amendment requiring parental consent before children could seek mental health treatment under the bill; such language was included in the final bill.

In 2021 they planned events dedicated to organizing citizens to lobby school boards to ban critical race theory and gender identity instruction, and to require parental consent for mental health services and sex education in schools.

== See also ==
- Indiana gubernatorial election, 2004 - where Eric Miller ran in the Republican primary
