= Kathy Davis =

American politician and entrepreneur (born 1956)

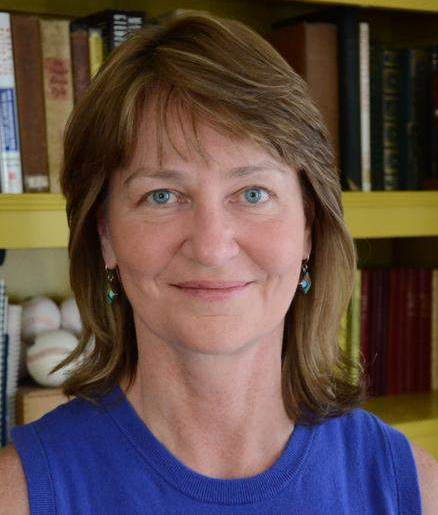

48th Lieutenant Governor of Indiana
- In office October 20, 2003 – January 10, 2005
- Governor: Joe Kernan
- Preceded by: Joe Kernan
- Succeeded by: Becky Skillman

Personal details
- Born: June 24, 1956 (age 70) Boston, Massachusetts, U.S.
- Party: Democratic
- Education: Massachusetts Institute of Technology (SB); Harvard University (MBA)

Katherine L. Davis (born June 24, 1956) is an American politician and entrepreneur. She was the 48th lieutenant governor of Indiana, and the first woman to serve in that office.

== Early life and education ==
Davis was born in Boston, Massachusetts, and earned a bachelor's degree in mechanical engineering from the Massachusetts Institute of Technology in 1978. Her professional career started out with Cambridge Collaborative, a research and development consulting firm owned by her father, Richard H. Lyon. She was an acoustics consultant where she analyzed vibrations in submarines. She attributes her experiences at the firm as her inspiration for much of her present career. She earned her master's degree from Harvard Business School and relocated to Indiana in 1982. After moving to Indiana, she went to work for the Cummins Engine Company where she spent several years leading their manufacturing operations.

== Career ==
=== Early career ===
Davis was appointed by former Indiana Governor Evan Bayh as the Deputy Commissioner of the Indiana Department of Transportation. She served in the position from 1989 to 1994 where she oversaw the transportation plans of the state.

Davis was appointed as state Budget Director by Governor Bayh in 1995. She was in charge of the state's $10 billion budget before being appointed by Governor Frank O'Bannon to the position of Secretary of the Family and Social Services Administration. While in this position, she was in charge of a $4 billion budget as well as more than 11,000 employees. During her time with the administration she oversaw the transition away from large facilities for MRDD and MI populations to more community based facilities. She left public service for a short time in 1998 but returned a short time later to run the public service agency for the Indiana's 21st Century Research and Technology Fund. She was credited with obtaining more than $21 million in contracts within five months in the position. Davis received another appointment in 2000 when former Indianapolis Mayor Bart Peterson made her the Controller for the City of Indianapolis where she served for four years.

Upon O'Bannon's death in 2003, Lieutenant Governor Joe Kernan ascended to the governorship, and he appointed Davis Lieutenant Governor, the first woman to hold the post. During her time in office, she served as President of the Indiana State Senate, Commissioner of Agriculture, Secretary of Commerce and chaired the Indiana Counter Terrorism and Security Council.

=== Return to private sector ===
Davis left the public sector again in 2005 at the end of the Kernan-Davis term. She took a position as the Chief Executive Officer of Global Access Point, a computer network connectivity company headquartered in South Bend, Indiana. She led the start-up of the company where she was in charge of developing markets in data transport, data processing, and data storage for business, health care organizations, and universities.

In 2006, Davis developed the idea for a virtual way to allow policy makers to develop complex policies. The program was initially developed by Simulex and then used by the United States Military. Fortune 500 companies also used the technology to select stereotypes for building outcomes. Davis founded Davis Design Group in 2007 as a way to determine results of long-term decisions made by lawmakers. The company uses a system called the Simulated Educational Experience (SEE) to predict the future of the educational system. The system is said to predict how decisions made in the public sector regarding education will affect students in the future.

=== Return to government ===
Davis took a position as campaign treasurer for Indiana Senator Joe Donnelly, but resigned in August 2015 because of Donnelly's vote to defund Planned Parenthood. She later took a job in an undefined role in Indianapolis mayor Joe Hogsett's administration, initially described as "city systems engineer".

=== Elections ===
Indiana Lt. Gubernatorial Election, 2004
Party	Candidate	Votes	%	±%
Republican	Becky Skillman	1,302,912	53.21%	+11.54%
Democratic	Kathy Davis	1,113,900	45.49%	−11.06%
Majority		189,012	7.72%	
Turnout		2,448,498	100.00%	
Republican hold		Swing		

== See also ==
- List of female lieutenant governors in the United States

Party political offices
Preceded by Joe Kernan	Democratic nominee for Lieutenant Governor of Indiana; 2004	Succeeded by Dennie Oxley
Political offices
Preceded by Joe Kernan	Lieutenant Governor of Indiana; 2003–2005	Succeeded by Becky Skillman
