= 2018 United States Senate election in Indiana =

- November 6, 2018
- Turnout: 50.42% ▼
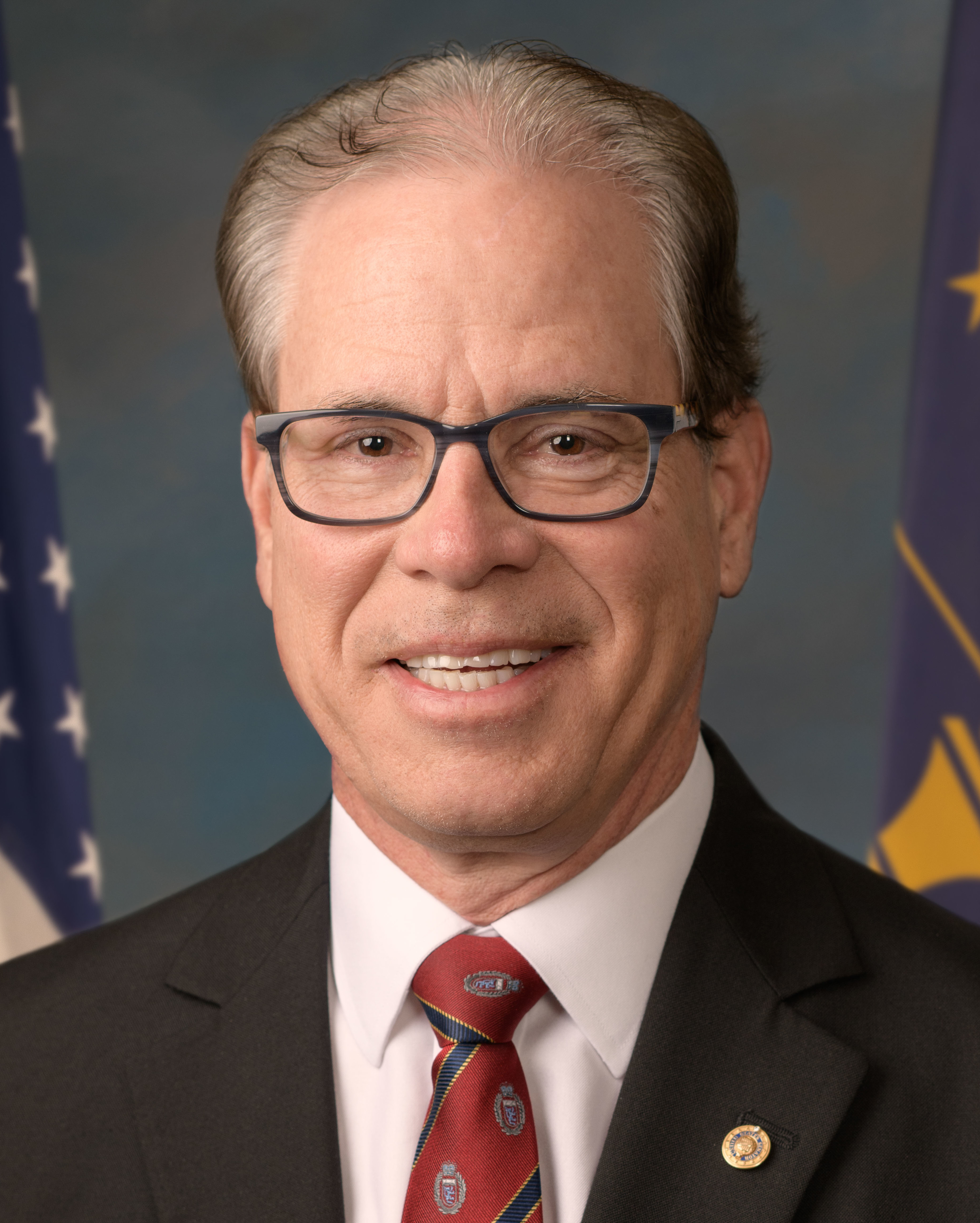

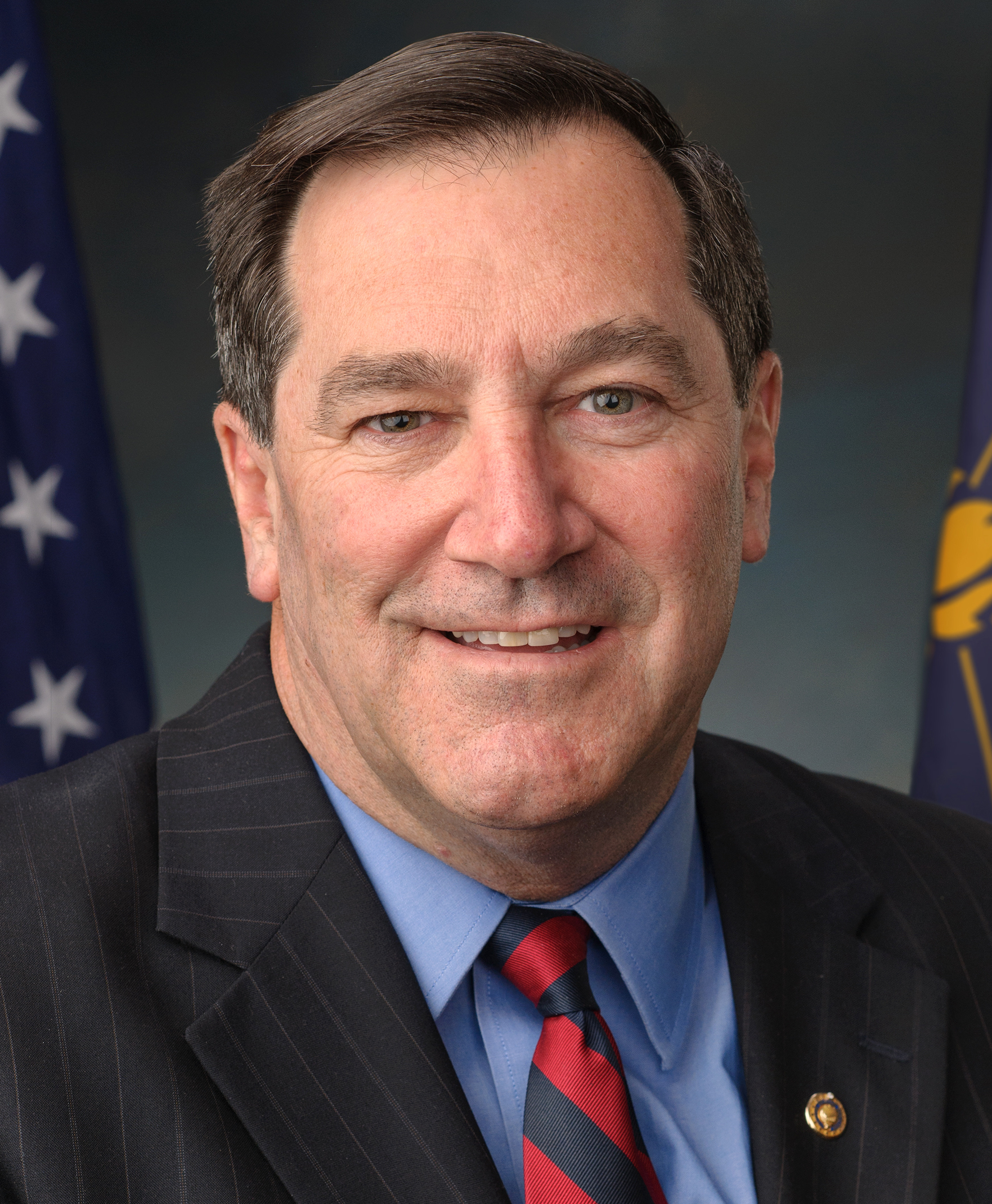
Nominee	Mike Braun	Joe Donnelly
Party	Republican	Democratic
Popular vote	1,158,000	1,023,553
Percentage	50.73%	44.84%
- Braun: 40–50% 50–60% 60–70% 70–80% 80–90% >90% Donnelly: 40–50% 50–60% 60–70% 70–80% 80–90% >90% Tie: 40–50% 50% No data
U.S. senator before election
Joe Donnelly
Democratic
Elected U.S. Senator
Mike Braun
Republican

The 2018 United States Senate election in Indiana took place on November 6, 2018, along with other elections to the United States Senate and House of Representatives and various state and local elections. Incumbent Democratic Senator Joe Donnelly ran for re-election to a second term, however, he lost in the general election to Republican Mike Braun by a margin of 6%. This was the second consecutive election for this seat in which the incumbent was defeated and/or the seat flipped parties.

This was one of ten Democratic-held Senate seats up for election in a state won by Donald Trump in the 2016 presidential election. In 2017, Politico described the race as "possibly the GOP's best opportunity to seize a Senate seat from Democrats" in the 2018 elections. The primary election was held on May 8, 2018. In October 2018, RealClearPolitics rated the race a toss-up between the Democratic and Republican nominees, with the Libertarian receiving a poll average of 6%.

Instead of running for a second senatorial term in 2024, Braun campaigned successfully to become Governor of Indiana.

== Background ==
In 2012, Joe Donnelly was elected to the Senate with 50% of the vote to Republican nominee Richard Mourdock's 44%. In the 2016 presidential election, Republican nominee Donald Trump won Indiana with about 56.5% of the vote to Democratic nominee Hillary Clinton's 37.5%.

== Democratic primary ==
=== Candidates ===
==== Nominee ====
- Joe Donnelly, incumbent U.S. senator

==== Withdrew ====
- Martin Del Rio, Iraq War veteran

=== Endorsements ===
Joe Donnelly

U.S. executive branch officials

- Joe Biden, 47th vice president of the United States

U.S. senators

- Doug Jones, U.S. senator from Alabama

Organizations

- End Citizens United

=== Results ===
Democratic primary results
Party	Candidate	Votes	%
Democratic	Joe Donnelly (incumbent)	284,621	100.00%
Total votes		284,621	100.00%

== Republican primary ==
=== Candidates ===
==== Nominee ====
- Mike Braun, businessman and former state representative

==== Eliminated in the primary election ====
- Luke Messer, U.S. representative
- Todd Rokita, U.S. representative

==== Declined ====
- Jim Banks, U.S. representative
- Susan Brooks, U.S. representative (endorsed Luke Messer)
- Mike Delph, state senator (endorsed Todd Rokita)
- Jackie Walorski, U.S. representative

==== Withdrawn ====
- Terry Henderson, businessman (endorsed Mike Braun)
- Andy Horning, Libertarian nominee for the U.S. Senate in 2012 and Libertarian nominee for IN-08 in 2014
- Mark Hurt, attorney and former congressional aide
- Andrew Takami, director of Purdue Polytechnic New Albany (endorsed Luke Messer)

=== Endorsements ===
Mike Braun

U.S. senators

- Tom Coburn (R-OK)

State senators

- Liz Brown

State representatives

- Ronald Bacon
- Christopher Judy
- Chris May
- Bob Morris

Organizations

- National Organization for Marriage
- Tea Party Patriots

Newspapers

- The Journal Gazette
Luke Messer

U.S. representatives

- Susan Brooks, U.S. representative (R-IN)

State-level officials

- Martin Carbaugh, state representative
- Dave Heine, state representative
- Todd Huston, state representative
- David C. Long, state senate president pro tempore
- Wendy McNamara, state representative
- Thomas Wyss, former state senator

Former state party chairs

- Tim Berry
- J. Murray Clark
- Gordon Durnil
- Al Hubbard
- Jim Kittle
- Bruce Melchert

Local-level officials

- Christine Altman, Hamilton County Commissioner
- James Brainard, Carmel mayor
- Andy Cook, Westfield mayor
- Steve Dillinger, Hamilton County Commissioner
- Scott Fadness, Fishers mayor
- Mark Heirbrandt, Hamilton County Commissioner

Individuals

- James Bopp, conservative attorney and constitutional scholar
Todd Rokita

State-level officials

- Mike Delph, state senator
- Alan Morrison, state representative
- Hal Slager, state representative
- Heath VanNatter, state representative

Former state party chairs

- Jeff Cardwell
- Rexford C. Early

Local-level officials

- Ken Meyer, Decatur mayor
- Monty Snelling, Clark County auditor

Individuals

- Russ Willis, chairman of the Madison County Republican Party

Newspapers

- The Times of Northwest Indiana

=== Polling ===
Poll source	Date(s) administered	Sample size	Margin of error	Luke Messer	Todd Rokita	Mike Braun	Other	Undecided
Strategic National (R)	May 5–6, 2018	300	± 5.7%	29%	28%	44%	–	–
Gravis Marketing	April 6–11, 2018	280	± 5.9%	13%	16%	26%	–	45%
GS Strategy Group (R-Rokita)	January 6–9, 2018	500	± 4.4%	9%	24%	9%	–	58%
GS Strategy Group (R-Rokita)	July 16–18, 2017	500	± 4.4%	20%	28%	–	–	51%
GS Strategy Group (R-Rokita)	July 16–18, 2017	500	± 4.4%	14%	21%	11%	–	55%
OnMedia (R-Messer)	July 10–12, 2017	400	± 4.8%	23%	23%	2%	7% (Note: Curtis Hill* 4%; Mark Hurt†, Terry Henderson†, and Andrew Takami† with 1%. *Hypothetical candidate. †Withdrawn.)	45%

=== Results ===
Results by county: Braun: 80–90%; 60–70%; 50–60%; 40–50%; <40%; Rokita: <40%; 40–50%; Messer: <40%; 40–50%; 50–60%; 60–70%

Republican primary results
Party	Candidate	Votes	%
Republican	Mike Braun	208,602	41.17%
Republican	Todd Rokita	151,967	29.99%
Republican	Luke Messer	146,131	28.84%
Total votes		506,700	100.00%

== Independent ==
=== Candidates ===
==== Declared ====
- James Johnson Jr.

== General election ==
=== Candidates ===
- Mike Braun, businessman and former state representative (R)
- Lucy Brenton (L)
- Joe Donnelly, incumbent (D)
- James Johnson Jr. (I)

=== Debates ===
- Complete video of debate, October 8, 2018

=== Predictions ===
Source	Ranking	As of
The Cook Political Report	Tossup	October 26, 2018
Inside Elections	Tossup	November 1, 2018
Sabato's Crystal Ball	Lean R (flip)	November 5, 2018
CNN	Tossup	November 5, 2018
RealClearPolitics	Tossup	November 5, 2018
Daily Kos	Tossup	November 5, 2018
Fox News	Tossup	November 5, 2018
FiveThirtyEight	Lean D	November 5, 2018

=== Fundraising ===
Campaign finance reports as of October 17, 2018
Candidate (party)	Total receipts	Total disbursements	Cash on hand
Joe Donnelly (D)	$16,100,528	$13,872,981	$2,321,981
Mike Braun (R)	$16,964,706	$15,576,842	$1,387,861
Source: Federal Election Commission

=== Endorsements ===
Mike Braun (R)

U.S. executive branch officials

- George W. Bush, 43rd president of the United States
- Mike Pence, 48th vice president of the United States
- Donald Trump, 45th president of the United States

U.S. senators

- Tom Coburn (R-OK, former)
- Joni Ernst (R-IA)
- Lindsey Graham (R-SC)
- David Perdue (R-GA)
- Todd Young (R-IN)

U.S. representatives

- Jim Banks, U.S. representative (R-IN)
- Mark Meadows, U.S. representative (R-NC)
- Todd Rokita, U.S. representative, 2018 Senate candidate (R-IN)

Governors

- Eric Holcomb, governor of Indiana

State senators

- Liz Brown

State representatives

- Ronald Bacon
- Christopher Judy
- Chris May
- Bob Morris

Cabinet-level officials

- Kellyanne Conway, Counselor to the President
- Sarah Huckabee Sanders, White House Press Secretary
- Ivanka Trump, Advisor to the President

Individuals

- Dan Bongino, NRATV contributor
- Rudy Giuliani, former mayor of New York City
- Kimberly Guilfoyle, television news personality
- Lou Holtz, former Notre Dame football coach
- Bob Knight, former Indiana University basketball coach
- Ronna McDaniel, chair of the RNC
- Oliver North, president of the National Rifle Association of America
- Greg Pence, brother of Mike Pence
- Donald Trump Jr., businessman and son of U.S. President Donald Trump

Organizations

- FreedomWorks
- Indiana Manufacturers Association
- Indiana Right to Life
- National Federation of Independent Business
- National Organization for Marriage
- NRA Political Victory Fund
- Republican Jewish Coalition
- Tea Party Patriots
- U.S. Chamber of Commerce
Joe Donnelly (D)

U.S. executive branch officials

- Joe Biden, 47th vice president of the United States
- Chuck Hagel, former United States Secretary of Defense (Republican)
- Barack Obama, 44th president of the United States

U.S. senators

- Michael Bennet, U.S. senator from Colorado
- Cory Booker, U.S. senator from New Jersey
- Chris Coons, U.S. senator from Delaware
- Catherine Cortez Masto, U.S. senator from Nevada
- Tammy Duckworth, U.S. senator from Illinois
- Dick Durbin, U.S. senator from Illinois
- Kamala Harris, U.S. senator from California
- Doug Jones, U.S. senator from Alabama
- Amy Klobuchar, U.S. senator from Minnesota
- Brian Schatz, U.S. senator from Hawaii

Local officials

- John R. Gregg, former Speaker of the Indiana House of Representatives
- Thomas McDermott Jr., mayor of Hammond, Indiana

Individuals

- Derrick Mayes, professional football player
- Victor Oladipo, professional basketball player for the Indiana Pacers
- Amy Schumer, actress
- Amy Siskind, activist and writer

Organizations

- Alliance for Retired Americans
- Communications Workers of America
- End Citizens United
- National Committee to Preserve Social Security and Medicare
- National Education Association
- United Automobile Workers

Newspapers

- Journal Gazette
Declined to endorse

Organizations

- Indiana Chamber of Commerce

Newspapers

- Indianapolis Star

=== Polling ===
Graphical summary

View source data.

Poll source	Date(s) administered	Sample size	Margin of error	Joe Donnelly (D)	Mike Braun (R)	Lucy Brenton (L)	Other	Undecided
HarrisX	November 3–5, 2018	600	± 4.0%	42%	43%	–	–	–
HarrisX	November 2–4, 2018	600	± 4.0%	43%	41%	–	–	–
HarrisX	November 1–3, 2018	600	± 4.0%	43%	42%	–	–	–
HarrisX	October 31 – November 2, 2018	600	± 4.0%	44%	42%	–	–	–
HarrisX	October 30 – November 1, 2018	600	± 4.0%	43%	43%	–	–	–
HarrisX	October 29–31, 2018	600	± 4.0%	40%	43%	–	–	–
Fox News	October 27–30, 2018	722 LV	± 3.5%	45%	38%	5%	2%	9%
Fox News	October 27–30, 2018	852 RV	± 3.0%	42%	38%	6%	2%	11%
HarrisX	October 24–30, 2018	1,400	± 2.6%	42%	42%	–	–	–
NBC News/Marist	October 24–28, 2018	496 LV	± 5.5%	45%	42%	7%	<1%	5%
NBC News/Marist	October 24–28, 2018	496 LV	± 5.5%	48%	46%	–	2%	5%
NBC News/Marist	October 24–28, 2018	800 RV	± 4.2%	43%	40%	9%	<1%	7%
NBC News/Marist	October 24–28, 2018	800 RV	± 4.2%	47%	45%	–	2%	7%
Cygnal (R)	October 26–27, 2018	505	± 4.4%	46%	49%	–	3%	2%
YouGov	October 23–26, 2018	975	± 3.7%	43%	46%	3%	0%	8%
Mason Strategies (R)	October 15–20, 2018	600	± 3.9%	43%	47%	3%	–	7%
American Viewpoint (R-Braun)	October 14–17, 2018	800	–	40%	44%	7%	–	5%
SurveyUSA	October 12–16, 2018	816	± 4.6%	41%	40%	8%	–	11%
Gravis Marketing	October 12–16, 2018	377	± 5.1%	44%	40%	7%	–	10%
Vox Populi Polling	October 13–15, 2018	783	± 3.5%	55%	45%	–	–	–
American Viewpoint (R-Braun)	October 7–10, 2018	800	–	40%	44%	7%	–	7%
American Viewpoint (R-Braun)	September 30 – October 3, 2018	800	–	39%	43%	7%	–	5%
Fox News	September 29 – October 2, 2018	695 LV	± 3.5%	43%	41%	6%	2%	9%
Fox News	September 29 – October 2, 2018	806 RV	± 3.5%	41%	40%	6%	1%	10%
Ipsos	September 12–20, 2018	1,181	± 3.0%	46%	43%	–	3%	8%
Fox News	September 8–11, 2018	677 LV	± 3.5%	43%	45%	3%	1%	8%
Fox News	September 8–11, 2018	804 RV	± 3.5%	42%	41%	4%	1%	10%
NBC News/Marist	August 26–29, 2018	576 LV	± 5.0%	44%	41%	8%	1%	6%
NBC News/Marist	August 26–29, 2018	576 LV	± 5.0%	49%	43%	–	2%	7%
NBC News/Marist	August 26–29, 2018	816 RV	± 4.2%	43%	40%	8%	1%	8%
NBC News/Marist	August 26–29, 2018	816 RV	± 4.2%	48%	42%	–	2%	9%
Trafalgar Group (R)	July 31 – August 7, 2018	1,420	± 2.6%	51%	39%	–	–	11%
SurveyMonkey/Axios	June 11 – July 2, 2018	952	± 5.0%	47%	49%	–	–	4%
Gravis Marketing	May 10–15, 2018	400	± 4.9%	46%	47%	–	–	7%

Hypothetical polling

with Todd Rokita

Poll source	Date(s) administered	Sample size	Margin of error	Joe Donnelly (D)	Todd Rokita (R)	Undecided
Gravis Marketing	April 6–11, 2018	411	± 4.8%	50%	32%	18%

with Luke Messer

Poll source	Date(s) administered	Sample size	Margin of error	Joe Donnelly (D)	Luke Messer (R)	Undecided
Gravis Marketing	April 6–11, 2018	411	± 4.8%	46%	36%	18%

with generic Republican

Poll source	Date(s) administered	Sample size	Margin of error	Joe Donnelly (D)	Generic Republican	Undecided
SurveyMonkey/Axios	February 12 – March 5, 2018	1,809	± 3.8%	45%	51%	4%

=== Results ===
State House district results

On November 6, 2018, Braun won the general election. He swept southern Indiana, the exurbs of Indianapolis, and most other rural areas in the state. Donnelly ran well behind his 2012 vote totals, winning only in Indianapolis, the university centers (Bloomington, Terre Haute, West Lafayette, South Bend), and the suburbs of Chicago in Northwest Indiana.

United States Senate election in Indiana, 2018
Party	Candidate	Votes	%	±%
Republican	Mike Braun	1,158,000	50.73%	+6.45%
Democratic	Joe Donnelly (incumbent)	1,023,553	44.84%	−5.20%
Libertarian	Lucy Brenton	100,942	4.42%	−1.3%
Write-in		70	<0.00%	N/A
Total votes		2,282,565	100.00%	N/A
Republican gain from Democratic				

==== By county ====
County	Mike Braun Republican		Joe Donnelly Democratic		Lucy Brenton Libertarian		Margin		Total
County	Votes	%	Votes	%	Votes	%	Votes	%	Total
Adams	7,511	67.39%	3,146	28.23%	489	4.39%	4,365	39.16%	11,146
Allen	65,927	52.36%	55,903	44.40%	4,080	3.24%	10,024	7.96%	125,910
Bartholomew	15,222	57.41%	10,071	37.98%	1,223	4.61%	5,151	19.43%	26,516
Benton	1,926	64.98%	847	28.58%	191	6.44%	1,079	36.40%	2,964
Blackford	2,303	59.39%	1,275	32.88%	300	7.74%	1,028	26.51%	3,878
Boone	15,540	56.43%	10,981	39.87%	1,019	3.70%	4,559	16.55%	27,540
Brown	4,103	57.07%	2,768	38.50%	318	4.42%	1,335	18.57%	7,189
Carroll	4,518	65.35%	2,071	29.95%	325	4.70%	2,447	35.39%	6,914
Cass	6,617	57.79%	4,061	35.47%	772	6.74%	2,556	22.32%	11,450
Clark	22,766	52.60%	18,551	42.86%	1,967	4.54%	4,215	9.74%	43,284
Clay	6,207	66.91%	2,601	28.04%	469	5.06%	3,606	38.87%	9,277
Clinton	5,967	64.81%	2,755	29.92%	485	5.27%	3,212	34.89%	9,207
Crawford	2,252	56.83%	1,504	37.95%	207	5.22%	748	18.87%	3,963
Daviess	6,555	75.01%	1,901	21.75%	283	3.24%	4,654	53.26%	8,739
Dearborn	13,287	72.79%	4,481	24.55%	487	2.67%	8,806	48.24%	18,255
Decatur	6,246	69.35%	2,287	25.39%	473	5.25%	3,959	43.96%	9,006
DeKalb	9,167	65.80%	4,204	30.18%	561	4.03%	4,963	35.62%	13,932
Delaware	17,447	46.27%	18,159	48.16%	2,099	5.57%	-712	-1.89%	37,705
Dubois	11,204	65.42%	5,264	30.74%	658	3.84%	5,940	34.68%	17,126
Elkhart	31,164	57.83%	21,062	39.09%	1,661	3.08%	10,102	18.75%	53,887
Fayette	4,704	63.02%	2,295	30.75%	465	6.23%	2,409	32.27%	7,464
Floyd	16,588	52.12%	14,070	44.21%	1,167	3.67%	2,518	7.91%	31,825
Fountain	4,060	69.18%	1,496	25.49%	313	5.33%	2,564	43.69%	5,869
Franklin	5,614	75.54%	1,619	21.78%	199	2.68%	3,995	53.75%	7,432
Fulton	4,154	59.28%	2,539	36.23%	315	4.49%	1,615	23.05%	7,008
Gibson	8,040	64.26%	4,001	31.98%	471	3.76%	4,039	32.28%	12,512
Grant	12,393	61.76%	6,745	33.61%	929	4.63%	5,648	28.15%	20,067
Greene	6,949	64.50%	3,313	30.75%	511	4.74%	3,636	33.75%	10,773
Hamilton	72,325	52.38%	61,337	44.42%	4,410	3.19%	10,988	7.96%	138,072
Hancock	19,097	63.10%	9,770	32.28%	1,399	4.62%	9,327	30.82%	30,266
Harrison	9,847	63.05%	5,131	32.86%	639	4.09%	4,716	30.20%	15,617
Hendricks	36,966	58.85%	23,599	37.57%	2,247	3.58%	13,367	21.28%	62,812
Henry	9,569	60.98%	5,171	32.95%	953	6.07%	4,398	28.03%	15,693
Howard	16,736	57.18%	11,159	38.12%	1,376	4.70%	5,577	19.05%	29,271
Huntington	8,879	67.22%	3,699	28.00%	631	4.78%	5,180	39.22%	13,209
Jackson	9,431	65.43%	4,198	29.12%	785	5.45%	5,233	36.30%	14,414
Jasper	6,987	66.00%	3,278	30.97%	321	3.03%	3,709	35.04%	10,586
Jay	3,990	63.42%	1,933	30.73%	368	5.85%	2,057	32.70%	6,291
Jefferson	6,345	56.44%	4,313	38.37%	584	5.19%	2,032	18.08%	11,242
Jennings	5,921	64.72%	2,686	29.36%	542	5.92%	3,235	35.36%	9,149
Johnson	32,540	62.70%	17,479	33.68%	1,883	3.63%	15,061	29.02%	51,902
Knox	7,876	62.38%	3,977	31.50%	772	6.11%	3,899	30.88%	12,625
Kosciusko	18,558	70.34%	6,801	25.78%	1,022	3.87%	11,757	44.57%	26,381
LaGrange	5,183	67.49%	2,217	28.87%	280	3.65%	2,966	38.62%	7,680
Lake	54,564	33.62%	104,390	64.32%	3,340	2.06%	-49,826	-30.70%	162,294
LaPorte	16,008	42.98%	20,014	53.73%	1,225	3.29%	-4,006	-10.76%	37,247
Lawrence	10,274	66.30%	4,434	28.61%	788	5.09%	5,840	37.69%	15,496
Madison	22,841	51.83%	18,701	42.44%	2,526	5.73%	4,140	9.39%	44,068
Marion	98,385	32.04%	197,880	64.43%	10,840	3.53%	-99,495	-32.40%	307,105
Marshall	8,747	58.71%	5,619	37.71%	533	3.58%	3,128	20.99%	14,899
Martin	2,997	69.31%	1,127	26.06%	200	4.63%	1,870	43.25%	4,324
Miami	6,975	67.30%	2,862	27.61%	527	5.08%	4,113	39.69%	10,364
Monroe	15,540	29.94%	34,193	65.87%	2,174	4.19%	-18,653	-35.94%	51,907
Montgomery	8,362	66.69%	3,518	28.06%	659	5.26%	4,844	38.63%	12,539
Morgan	17,539	69.72%	6,471	25.72%	1,148	4.56%	11,068	43.99%	25,158
Newton	2,966	65.00%	1,402	30.73%	195	4.27%	1,564	34.28%	4,563
Noble	8,993	65.70%	4,132	30.18%	564	4.12%	4,861	35.51%	13,689
Ohio	1,586	66.22%	747	31.19%	62	2.59%	839	35.03%	2,395
Orange	4,353	64.28%	2,135	31.53%	284	4.19%	2,218	32.75%	6,772
Owen	4,601	63.96%	2,210	30.72%	383	5.32%	2,391	33.24%	7,194
Parke	3,532	66.12%	1,499	28.06%	311	5.82%	2,033	38.06%	5,342
Perry	3,450	48.25%	3,364	47.04%	337	4.71%	86	1.20%	7,151
Pike	3,235	62.71%	1,679	32.55%	245	4.75%	1,556	30.16%	5,159
Porter	29,368	45.32%	33,390	51.53%	2,037	3.14%	-4,022	-6.21%	64,795
Posey	6,324	59.44%	3,881	36.48%	435	4.09%	2,443	22.96%	10,640
Pulaski	2,583	59.26%	1,617	37.10%	159	3.65%	966	22.16%	4,359
Putnam	7,814	65.67%	3,512	29.52%	573	4.82%	4,302	36.15%	11,899
Randolph	5,138	63.35%	2,467	30.42%	505	6.23%	2,671	32.93%	8,110
Ripley	6,880	72.66%	2,350	24.82%	239	2.52%	4,530	47.84%	9,469
Rush	3,991	65.61%	1,690	27.78%	402	6.61%	2,301	37.83%	6,083
St. Joseph	36,456	39.08%	53,758	57.63%	3,073	3.29%	-17,302	-18.55%	93,287
Scott	4,241	55.34%	3,113	40.62%	309	4.03%	1,128	14.72%	7,663
Shelby	9,340	64.78%	4,333	30.05%	745	5.17%	5,007	34.73%	14,418
Spencer	5,202	58.61%	3,218	36.26%	455	5.13%	1,984	22.35%	8,875
Starke	4,149	54.71%	3,119	41.13%	316	4.17%	1,030	13.58%	7,584
Steuben	7,839	64.39%	3,864	31.74%	472	3.88%	3,975	32.65%	12,175
Sullivan	4,340	58.66%	2,663	36.00%	395	5.34%	1,677	22.67%	7,398
Switzerland	1,874	64.07%	936	32.00%	115	3.93%	938	32.07%	2,925
Tippecanoe	22,649	44.02%	26,376	51.26%	2,431	4.72%	-3,727	-7.24%	51,456
Tipton	4,062	66.30%	1,734	28.30%	331	5.40%	2,328	38.00%	6,127
Union	1,749	69.85%	682	27.24%	73	2.92%	1,067	42.61%	2,504
Vanderburgh	29,375	50.20%	27,183	46.45%	1,962	3.35%	2,192	3.75%	58,520
Vermillion	3,002	53.68%	2,198	39.31%	392	7.01%	804	14.38%	5,592
Vigo	14,813	46.79%	15,171	47.92%	1,674	5.29%	-358	-1.13%	31,658
Wabash	7,658	67.78%	3,159	27.96%	482	4.27%	4,499	39.82%	11,299
Warren	2,208	67.34%	914	27.87%	157	4.79%	1,294	39.46%	3,279
Warrick	14,010	57.50%	9,594	39.37%	762	3.13%	4,416	18.12%	24,366
Washington	6,127	65.31%	2,806	29.91%	448	4.78%	3,321	35.40%	9,381
Wayne	11,241	56.88%	7,482	37.86%	1,039	5.26%	3,759	19.02%	19,762
Wells	7,819	71.79%	2,694	24.73%	379	3.48%	5,125	47.05%	10,892
White	5,100	60.05%	2,739	32.25%	654	7.70%	2,361	27.80%	8,493
Whitley	9,019	67.39%	3,818	28.53%	547	4.09%	5,201	38.86%	13,384

Counties that flipped from Democratic to Republican

- Madison (largest city: Anderson)
- Spencer (largest city: Santa Claus)
- Starke (largest city: Knox)
- Vanderburgh (largest city: Evansville)
- Scott (largest city: Scottsburg)
- Blackford (largest city: Hartford City)
- Clark (largest city: Jeffersonville)
- Crawford (largest city: Marengo)
- Floyd (largest city: New Albany)
- Jefferson (largest city: Madison)
- Fayette (largest city: Connersville)
- Henry (largest city: New Castle)
- Howard (largest city: Kokomo)
- Wayne (largest city: Richmond)
- Vermillion (largest city: Clinton)
- Perry (largest city: Tell City)
- Sullivan (largest city: Sullivan)

==== By congressional district ====
Braun won six of nine congressional districts, with Donnelly winning the other three, including one held by a Republican.

District	Donnelly	Braun	Elected representative
1st	61%	37%	Pete Visclosky
2nd	45%	51%	Jackie Walorski
3rd	37%	60%	Jim Banks
4th	37%	58%	Jim Baird
5th	48.4%	47.9%	Susan Brooks
6th	34%	61%	Greg Pence
7th	65%	32%	André Carson
8th	38%	57%	Larry Bucshon
9th	41%	54%	Trey Hollingsworth

== Analysis ==
=== Voter demographics ===
Edison Research exit poll
Demographic subgroup	Donnelly	Braun	No Answer	% of voters
Gender
Men	40	57	3	49
Women	49	46	5	51
Age
18–29 years old	48	45	7	13
30–44 years old	49	43	8	20
45–64 years old	44	54	3	39
65 and older	41	57	1	28
Race
White	40	56	4	86
Black	88	11	1	8
Latino	71	22	6	3
Asian	N/A	N/A	N/A	1
Other	N/A	N/A	N/A	2
Race by gender
White men	35	62	3	42
White women	44	51	5	44
Black men	82	15	2	4
Black women	95	5	0	4
Latino men	N/A	N/A	N/A	1
Latina women	N/A	N/A	N/A	2
Others	N/A	N/A	N/A	2
Education
High school or less	40	56	4	23
Some college education	40	54	6	26
Associate degree	41	55	4	13
Bachelor's degree	46	51	3	22
Advanced degree	61	36	2	16
Education and race
White college graduates	49	48	3	34
White no college degree	33	62	5	53
Non-white college graduates	80	19	2	4
Non-white no college degree	76	20	4	10
Whites by education and gender
White women with college degrees	57	39	4	17
White women without college degrees	36	59	6	27
White men with college degrees	41	57	2	17
White men without college degrees	31	65	4	26
Non-whites	77	20	3	14
Income
Under $30,000	49	44	8	15
$30,000–49,999	46	49	4	23
$50,000–99,999	44	55	2	35
$100,000–199,999	44	52	4	22
Over $200,000	N/A	N/A	N/A	5
Party ID
Democrats	92	6	2	29
Republicans	8	90	2	39
Independents	47	44	9	31
Party by gender
Democratic men	92	6	2	12
Democratic women	93	5	2	18
Republican men	8	91	1	19
Republican women	8	90	2	20
Independent men	42	52	7	18
Independent women	55	33	12	13
Ideology
Liberals	86	8	6	20
Moderates	59	37	5	40
Conservatives	10	88	2	40
Marital status
Married	43	54	3	61
Unmarried	51	46	3	39
Gender by marital status
Married men	38	60	2	31
Married women	48	49	3	30
Unmarried men	42	53	5	19
Unmarried women	61	39	1	20
First-time midterm election voter
Yes	41	53	6	15
No	46	51	3	85
Most important issue facing the country
Health care	70	26	4	41
Immigration	10	85	5	27
Economy	31	66	3	21
Gun policy	66	31	3	8
Area type
Urban	63	33	4	31
Suburban	44	53	3	44
Rural	37	58	5	25
Source: CNN
