= 2024 Indiana gubernatorial election =

- November 5, 2024
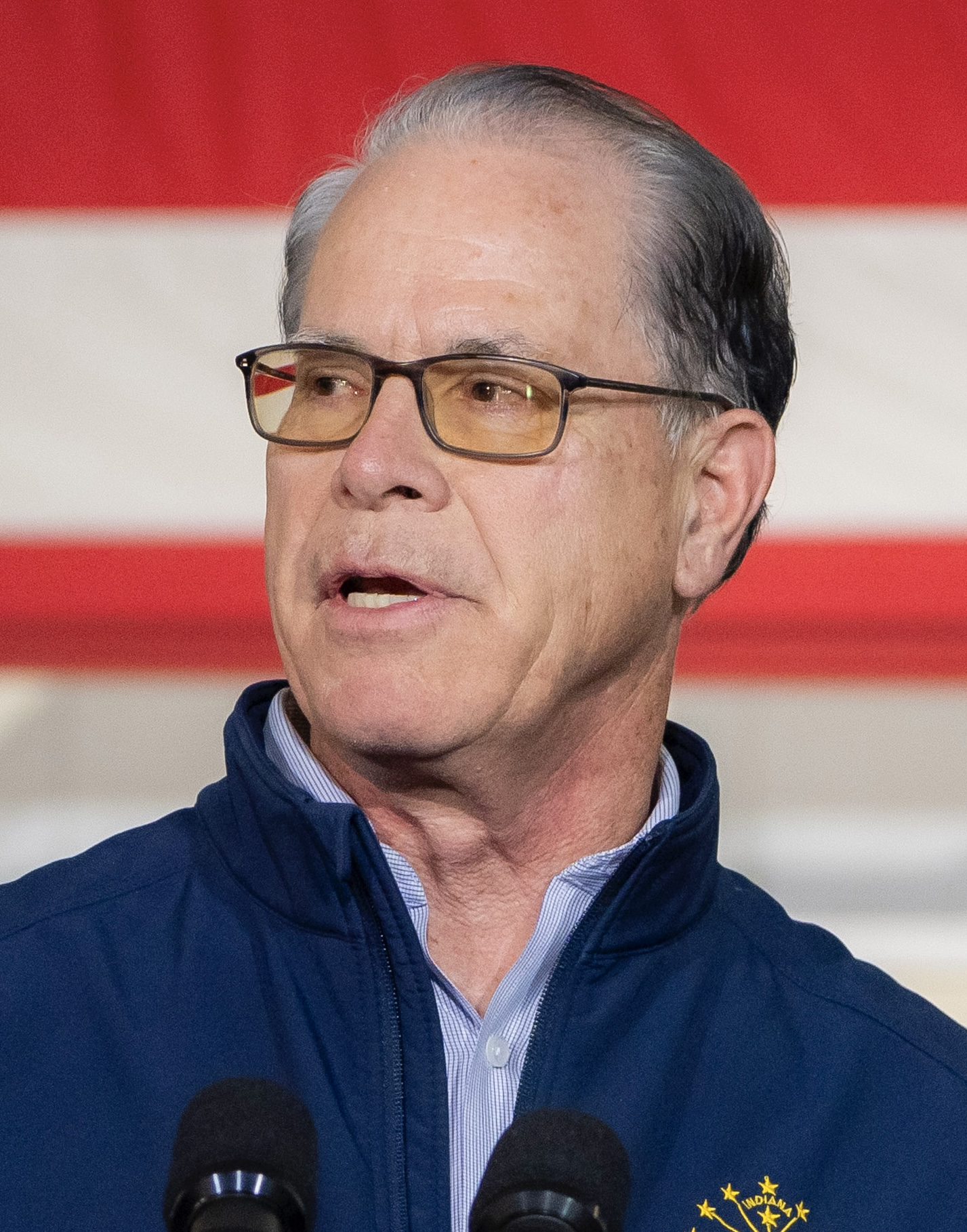

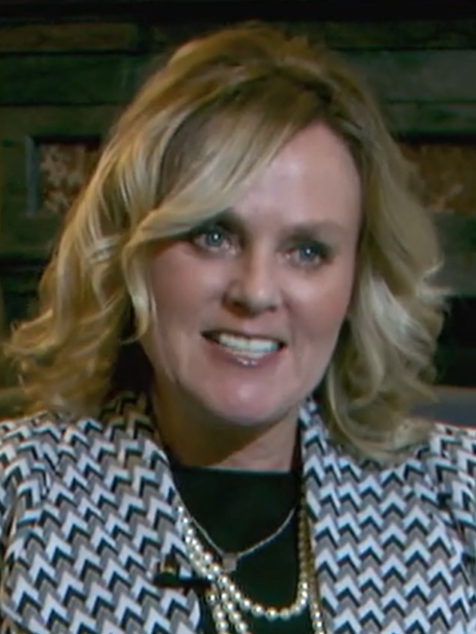
Nominee	Mike Braun	Jennifer McCormick
Party	Republican	Democratic
Running mate	Micah Beckwith	Terry Goodin
Popular vote	1,566,081	1,183,741
Percentage	54.38%	41.11%
- Braun: 40–50% 50–60% 60–70% 70–80% 80–90% >90% McCormick: 40–50% 50–60% 60–70% 70–80% 80–90% >90% Tie: 40–50% 50% No votes
Governor before election
Eric Holcomb
Republican
Elected Governor
Mike Braun
Republican

The 2024 Indiana gubernatorial election was held on November 5, 2024, to elect the next governor of Indiana, concurrently with the 2024 U.S. presidential election, as well as elections to the United States Senate and the United States House of Representatives and various state and local elections. Republican Senator Mike Braun won his first term in office, defeating Democrat former state Superintendent of Public Instruction Jennifer McCormick. He succeeded Republican incumbent Eric Holcomb, who was term-limited and could not seek a third consecutive term.

Primary elections took place on May 7, 2024, in which Republican U.S. Senator Mike Braun, Democratic former state Superintendent of Public Instruction Jennifer McCormick, and Libertarian software engineer Donald Rainwater won their respective parties' nominations. Braun defeated McCormick with 54.4 percent of the vote in the general election. Despite this, McCormick's performance marked a significant improvement from that of Woody Myers in the 2020 election.

Democrats have not won a gubernatorial election in Indiana since 2000.

== Republican primary ==
=== Candidates ===
==== Nominee ====
- Mike Braun, U.S. senator (2019–2025)

==== Eliminated in primary ====
- Brad Chambers, former Indiana Secretary of Commerce
- Suzanne Crouch, lieutenant governor of Indiana (2017–2025) and former Indiana State Auditor (2014–2017)
- Eric Doden, former president of the Indiana Economic Development Corporation
- Curtis Hill, former Indiana attorney general (2017–2021) and candidate for Indiana's 2nd congressional district in the 2022 special election
- Jamie Reitenour, businesswoman

==== Declined ====
- Mitch Daniels, former governor (2005–2013), former president of Purdue University (2013–2022), and former director of the Office of Management and Budget (2001–2003)
- Todd Rokita, Indiana attorney general (2021–present), former U.S. representative from Indiana's 4th congressional district (2011–2019), former Indiana Secretary of State (2002–2010), and candidate for U.S. Senate in 2018 (ran for re-election)

=== Endorsements ===
Mike Braun

Executive branch officials

- Donald Trump, 45th president of the United States (2017–2021)

Organizations

- Americans for Prosperity
- Club for Growth PAC
- Indiana Right to Life (co-endorsement with Crouch and Doden)
- International Franchise Association

Labor unions

- International Association of Sheet Metal, Air, Rail and Transportation Workers
- United Brotherhood of Carpenters and Joiners of America
Brad Chambers

U.S. representatives

- Susan Brooks, former U.S. representative for Indiana's 5th congressional district (2013–2021)

Local officials

- Scott Fadness, mayor of Fishers (2015–present)

Individuals

- Michael Andretti, owner of Andretti Global
Suzanne Crouch

U.S. representatives

- Larry Bucshon, U.S. representative for Indiana's 8th congressional district (2011–2025)
- Dan Burton, former U.S. representative for Indiana's 5th congressional district (1983–2013)
- Greg Pence, U.S. representative for Indiana's 6th congressional district (2019–2025)

State officials

- Connie Lawson, former Indiana Secretary of State (2012–2021)
- Becky Skillman, former lieutenant governor of Indiana (2005–2013)

State legislators

- Michael Aylesworth, state representative for the 11th district (2014–present)
- Jim Buck, state senator from the 21st district (2008–present)
- Dan Dernulc, state senator from the 1st district (2022–present)
- Blake Doriot, state senator from the 12th district (2016–present)
- Ryan Lauer, state representative for the 59th district (2018–present)
- Wendy McNamara, state representative for the 76th district (2010–present)
- Ryan Mishler, state senator from the 9th district (2004–present)
- Rick Niemeyer, state senator from the 6th district (2014–present)
- Julie Olthoff, state representative for the 19th district (2014–2018, 2020–present)
- J.D. Prescott, state representative for the 33rd district (2018–present)
- Jack Sandlin, state senator from the 36th district (2016–2023)
- Hal Slager, state representative for the 15th district (2012–2018, 2020–present)
- Jerry Torr, state representative for the 39th district (1996–2024)

Local officials

- Chris Jensen, mayor of Noblesville (2019–present)
- Lloyd Winnecke, former mayor of Evansville (2012–2024)

Organizations

- Indiana Right to Life (co-endorsement with Braun and Doden)
Eric Doden

Organizations

- Indiana Right to Life (co-endorsement with Braun and Crouch)
Curtis Hill

U.S. executive branch officials

- Michael Flynn, former U.S. National Security Advisor (2017) and former director of the Defense Intelligence Agency (2012–2014)

=== Polling ===
Poll source	Date(s) administered	Sample size (Note: Key: A – all adults RV – registered voters LV – likely voters V – unclear)	Margin of error	Mike Braun	Brad Chambers	Suzanne Crouch	Eric Doden	Curtis Hill	Jamie Reitenour	Undecided
SurveyUSA (Note: Poll commissioned by State Affairs and Howey Politics)	April 4–7, 2024	447 (LV)	± 4.5%	44%	8%	10%	8%	2%	2%	26%
Indy Politics/Crossroads Public Affairs	March 24–25, 2024	500 (LV)	± 4.8%	33%	10%	11%	11%	5%	1%	30%
Emerson College (Note: Poll sponsored by The Hill)	March 2–5, 2024	526 (LV)	± 4.2%	34%	5%	7%	7%	2%	2%	43%
Mark It Red (R) (Note: Poll sponsored by Braun's campaign)	December 18–20, 2023	(LV)	–	40%	5%	13%	3%	5%	–	30%
Mark It Red (R)	November 18–22, 2022	750 (LV)	± 2.5%	47%	–	10%	5%	–	–	37%

Hypothetical polling

Poll source	Date(s) administered	Sample size	Margin of error	Mike Braun	Suzanne Crouch	Eric Doden	Trey Hollingsworth	Todd Rokita	Other	Undecided
Bellwether Research	December 11–17, 2022	1,000 (LV)	–	25%	7%	3%	6%	9%	9% (Note: "I would like someone else to run" with 9%)	40%

=== Fundraising ===
Campaign finance reports as of April 16, 2024
Candidate	Raised	Spent	Cash on hand
Mike Braun (R)	$12,420,094	$9,760,847	$946,167
Brad Chambers (R)	$12,810,055 (Note: $8,000,000 of this total was self-funded by Chambers)	$12,048,947	$761,108
Suzanne Crouch (R)	$8,129,813	$4,391,792	$3,055,958
Eric Doden (R)	$11,236,992 (Note: $100,000 of this total was self-funded by Doden)	$10,040,685	$250,969
Curtis Hill (R)	$574,604	$560,352	$34,394
Jamie Reitenour (R)	$75,923	$68,920	$6,191
Source: Indiana Secretary of State

=== Debates & forums ===
2024 Indiana gubernatorial election Republican primary debates
No.	Date	Host	Moderator	Link	Participants					
Key: P Participant A Absent N Non-invitee I Invitee W Withdrawn										
Key: P Participant A Absent N Non-invitee I Invitee W Withdrawn					Braun	Chambers	Crouch	Doden	Hill	Reitenour
1	March 11, 2024	Current Publishing	Ann Marie Shambaugh	Video	P	P	P	P	P	P
2	March 26, 2024	FOX 59	Beairshelle Edmé; Dan Spehler	Video	P	P	P	P	N	N
3	March 27, 2024	WISH-TV	Phil Sanchez; April Simpson	Video	P	P	P	P	P	N
4	April 23, 2024	Indiana Debate Commission	Jon Schwantes	Video	A	P	P	P	P	P

2024 Indiana gubernatorial election Republican primary forum
No.	Date	Host	Moderator	Link	Participants					
Key: P Participant A Absent N Non-invitee I Invitee W Withdrawn										
Key: P Participant A Absent N Non-invitee I Invitee W Withdrawn					Braun	Chambers	Crouch	Doden	Hill	Reitenour
1	January 25, 2024	First Principles Forum	Devin Anderson; Joy Pullmann; Anchor Fanchon	Video	P	P	P	P	P	N

=== Results ===
Results by county: Braun: 20–30%; 30–40%; 40–50%; 50–60%; 60–70%; Crouch: 40–50%; Chambers: 20–30%

Republican primary results
Party	Candidate	Votes	%
Republican	Mike Braun	236,641	39.6
Republican	Suzanne Crouch	130,146	21.8
Republican	Brad Chambers	104,653	17.5
Republican	Eric Doden	71,135	11.9
Republican	Jamie Reitenour	28,757	4.8
Republican	Curtis Hill	26,837	4.5
Total votes		598,169	100.0

=== Lieutenant governor selection ===
The Republican nominee for lieutenant governor was chosen at a convention on June 15. After winning the gubernatorial primary, Mike Braun endorsed state representative Julie McGuire to be his running mate, but during the convention, delegates instead selected pastor Micah Beckwith in an upset.

==== Nominee ====
- Micah Beckwith, pastor, former Noblesville public library trustee, and candidate for Indiana's 5th congressional district in 2020

==== Eliminated at convention ====
- Julie McGuire, state representative from the 93rd district (2022–present)

==== Endorsements ====
Julie McGuire

Executive branch officials

- Donald Trump, 45th president of the United States (2017–2021)

U.S. senators

- Mike Braun, U.S. senator from Indiana (2019–2025) (nominee for governor)

Statewide officials

- Daniel Elliott, Indiana state treasurer (2023–present)
- Diego Morales, Indiana Secretary of State (2023–present)
- Elise Nieshalla, Indiana State Auditor (2023–present)

==== Results ====
Republican convention results
Candidate	Round 1	
Candidate	Votes	%
Micah Beckwith	891	51.83
Julie McGuire	828	48.17
Total ballots	1,719	100.00

== Democratic primary ==
=== Candidates ===
==== Declared ====
- Jennifer McCormick, former Indiana Superintendent of Public Instruction (2017–2021)

==== Disqualified ====
- Tamie Dixon-Tatum, municipal official and perennial candidate (ran for lieutenant governor)

==== Withdrawn ====
- Bob Kern, retired paralegal and perennial candidate (ran for lieutenant governor)

==== Declined ====
- Joe Donnelly, U.S. Ambassador to the Holy See (2022–2024) and former U.S. senator (2013–2019)
- Thomas McDermott Jr., mayor of Hammond, nominee for U.S. Senate in 2022, and candidate for Indiana's 1st congressional district in 2020

=== Endorsements ===
Jennifer McCormick

State legislators

- Vernon Smith, state representative from the 14th district (1990–present)

County officials

- Diana Hess, St. Joseph County councilor (2013–present)

Labor unions

- American Federation of Teachers – Indiana
- Communications Workers of America
- Indiana AFL–CIO
- United Mine Workers of America

Political parties

- Indiana Democratic Party

=== Results ===
Democratic primary results
Party	Candidate	Votes	%
Democratic	Jennifer McCormick	180,404	100.00%
Total votes		180,404	100.00%

=== Lieutenant governor selection ===
The Indiana Democratic Party nominated their candidate for lieutenant governor on July 13, 2024. On June 20, McCormick announced Terry Goodin as her preferred running mate, leading to controversy over Goodin's past positions on abortion, guns, and LGBT rights.

==== Nominee ====
- Terry Goodin, former Indiana director for USDA Rural Development and former Minority Leader of the Indiana House of Representatives (2017–2018) from the 66th district (2000–2020)

==== Eliminated at convention ====
- Tamie Dixon-Tatum, municipal official and perennial candidate
- Bob Kern, retired paralegal and perennial candidate
- Clif Marsiglio, educator and candidate for mayor of Indianapolis in 2023

==== Declined ====
- J. D. Ford, state senator from the 29th district (2018–present) (endorsed Goodin)

==== Endorsements ====
Terry Goodin

Statewide officials

- Jennifer McCormick, former Indiana superintendent of public instruction (2017–2021) (nominee for governor)

State legislators

- J. D. Ford, state senator from the 29th district (2018–present)

Individuals

- Mike Schmuhl, chair of the Indiana Democratic Party (2021–2025)

==== Results ====
Democratic convention results
Candidate	Round 1	
Candidate	Votes	%
Terry Goodin	1,209	79.28
Tamie Dixon-Tatum	162	10.62
Clif Marsiglio	145	9.51
Bob Kern	9	0.59
Total ballots	1,525	100.00

== Libertarian convention ==
=== Candidates ===
==== Nominee ====
- Donald Rainwater, software engineer and nominee for governor in 2020
  - Running mate: Tonya Hudson, real estate broker and nominee for Indiana's 9th congressional district in 2020 and 2022

== General election ==
=== Predictions ===
Source	Ranking	As of
The Cook Political Report	Likely R	October 15, 2024
Inside Elections	Likely R	September 26, 2024
Sabato's Crystal Ball	Likely R	October 4, 2024
RCP	Likely R	July 13, 2024
Elections Daily	Safe R	July 12, 2023
CNalysis	Likely R	November 1, 2024

=== Polling ===
Poll source	Date(s) administered	Sample size	Margin of error	Mike Braun (R)	Jennifer McCormick (D)	Donald Rainwater (L)	Undecided
ActiVote	October 5–28, 2024	400 (LV)	± 4.9%	56%	44%	–	–
ActiVote	September 3 – October 5, 2024	400 (LV)	± 4.9%	54%	46%	–	–
ARW Strategies (Note: Poll sponsored by Indy Politics)	September 23–25, 2024	600 (LV)	–	44%	37%	9%	10%
GBAO (D) (Note: Poll sponsored by the Democratic Governors Association)	September 19–22, 2024	600 (LV)	± 4.0%	44%	41%	8%	7%
Emerson College	September 12–13, 2024	1,000 (LV)	± 3.0%	45%	34%	6%	13%
Lake Research Partners (D) (Note: Poll sponsored by the campaign of Destiny Wells, 2024 Democratic nominee for attorney general)	August 26 – September 2, 2024	600 (LV)	± 4.0%	41%	39%	9%	11%
Public Policy Polling (D) (Note: Poll sponsored by McCormick's campaign)	August 15–16, 2023	663 (RV)	± 3.8%	46%	35%	–	19%

Hypothetical polling

Suzanne Crouch vs. Jennifer McCormick

Poll source	Date(s) administered	Sample size	Margin of error	Suzanne Crouch (R)	Jennifer McCormick (D)	Undecided
Public Policy Polling (D)	August 15–16, 2022	663 (RV)	± 3.8%	39%	35%	28%

Curtis Hill vs. Jennifer McCormick

Poll source	Date(s) administered	Sample size	Margin of error	Curtis Hill (R)	Jennifer McCormick (D)	Undecided
Public Policy Polling (D)	August 15–16, 2022	663 (RV)	± 3.8%	36%	36%	28%

=== Fundraising ===
Campaign finance reports as of December 31, 2024
Candidate	Raised	Spent	Cash on hand
Mike Braun (R)	$17,458,902.74	$17,325,858.53	$133,044.21
Jennifer McCormick (D)	$5,649,738.69	$5,613,398.64	$36,340.05
Donald Rainwater (L)	$113,703.38	$110,238.05	$3,465.33
Source: Indiana Secretary of State

=== Debates ===
==== Governor debates ====
2024 Indiana gubernatorial election debates
No.	Date	Host	Moderator	Link	Participants		
Key: P Participant A Absent N Non-invitee I Invitee W Withdrawn							
Key: P Participant A Absent N Non-invitee I Invitee W Withdrawn					Braun	McCormick	Rainwater
1	October 2, 2024	FOX 59/CBS 4	Dan Spehler & Beairshelle Edmé	Video	P	P	N
2	October 3, 2024	WISH-TV	Phil Sanchez	Video	P	P	P
3	October 24, 2024	Indiana Debate Commission	Laura Merrifield Wilson	Video	P	P	P

==== Lieutenant governor debate ====
2024 Indiana lieutenant gubernatorial election debate
No.	Date	Host	Moderator	Link	Participants		
Key: P Participant A Absent N Non-invitee I Invitee W Withdrawn							
Key: P Participant A Absent N Non-invitee I Invitee W Withdrawn					Beckwith	Goodin	Hudson
1	August 13, 2024	AgrIInstitute	Gerry Dick	Video	P	P	P

=== Results ===

2024 Indiana gubernatorial election
Party	Candidate	Votes	%	±%
Republican	Mike Braun Micah Beckwith	1,566,081	54.38%	−2.13
Democratic	Jennifer McCormick Terry Goodin	1,183,741	41.11%	+9.06
Libertarian	Donald Rainwater Tonya Hudson	129,781	4.51%	−6.93
Write-ins	Write-ins	52	0.00%	N/A
Total votes		2,879,655	100.00	
Republican hold				

==== By county ====
County	Mike Braun Republican		Jennifer McCormick Democratic		Various candidates Other parties		Margin		Total
County	#	%	#	%	#	%	#	%	Total
Adams	9,495	69.6%	3,399	24.9%	749	5.5%	6,096	44.7%	13,643
Allen	84,139	53.2%	67,803	42.9%	6,153	3.9%	16,336	10.3%	158,095
Bartholomew	20,406	58.5%	12,549	36.0%	1,922	5.5%	7,857	22.5%	34,877
Benton	2,654	67.1%	1,036	26.2%	264	6.7%	1,618	40.9%	3,954
Blackford	3,019	61.5%	1,358	27.6%	535	10.9%	1,661	33.9%	4,912
Boone	20,832	53.3%	16,170	41.3%	2,106	5.4%	4,662	12.0%	39,108
Brown	4,917	55.5%	2,936	33.2%	1,003	11.3%	1,981	22.3%	8,856
Carroll	6,176	67.1%	2,373	25.8%	654	7.1%	3,803	41.3%	9,203
Cass	8,976	63.4%	4,253	30.1%	921	6.5%	4,723	33.3%	14,150
Clark	31,970	55.4%	23,830	41.3%	1,926	3.3%	8,140	14.1%	57,726
Clay	8,261	71.0%	2,679	23.0%	698	6.0%	5,582	44.0%	11,638
Clinton	7,489	62.7%	3,585	30.0%	875	7.3%	3,904	32.7%	11,949
Crawford	3,235	65.6%	1,493	30.3%	204	4.1%	1,742	35.3%	4,932
Daviess	7,691	70.1%	2,343	21.3%	944	8.6%	5,348	48.8%	10,978
Dearborn	20,222	76.4%	5,431	20.5%	809	3.1%	14,791	55.9%	26,462
Decatur	8,243	70.8%	2,563	22.0%	829	7.1%	5,680	48.8%	11,635
DeKalb	13,100	67.1%	5,277	27.0%	1,159	5.9%	7,823	40.1%	19,536
Delaware	22,026	49.9%	20,177	45.7%	1,968	4.5%	1,849	4.2%	44,171
Dubois	11,950	58.1%	6,905	33.6%	1,723	8.4%	5,045	24.5%	20,578
Elkhart	43,571	62.4%	23,559	33.8%	2,648	3.8%	20,012	28.6%	69,778
Fayette	6,714	71.6%	2,201	23.5%	468	5.0%	4,513	48.1%	9,383
Floyd	22,642	55.2%	17,420	42.5%	968	2.4%	5,222	12.7%	41,030
Fountain	5,664	71.4%	1,704	21.5%	570	7.2%	3,960	49.9%	7,938
Franklin	8,763	77.4%	2,157	19.0%	404	3.6%	6,606	58.4%	11,324
Fulton	5,673	64.3%	2,358	26.7%	798	9.0%	3,315	37.6%	8,829
Gibson	11,073	70.7%	3,985	25.4%	607	3.9%	7,088	45.3%	15,665
Grant	15,694	63.6%	7,395	29.9%	1,604	6.5%	8,299	33.7%	24,693
Greene	9,530	67.8%	3,589	25.5%	933	6.6%	5,941	42.3%	14,052
Hamilton	100,223	51.2%	89,605	45.7%	6,031	3.1%	10,618	5.5%	195,859
Hancock	26,136	59.3%	14,775	33.6%	3,127	7.1%	11,361	25.7%	44,038
Harrison	13,785	68.4%	5,780	28.5%	632	3.1%	8,095	39.9%	20,287
Hendricks	45,136	56.0%	31,290	38.9%	4,103	5.1%	13,846	17.1%	80,529
Henry	13,004	63.1%	6,331	30.7%	1,269	6.2%	6,673	32.4%	20,604
Howard	23,030	59.7%	13,173	34.1%	2,390	6.2%	9,857	25.6%	38,593
Huntington	11,348	66.2%	4,624	27.0%	1,177	6.9%	6,724	39.2%	17,149
Jackson	12,760	68.7%	4,788	25.8%	1,020	5.5%	7,972	42.9%	18,568
Jasper	10,484	70.3%	3,724	25.0%	708	4.7%	6,760	45.3%	14,916
Jay	5,262	67.8%	1,943	25.0%	553	7.1%	3,319	42.8%	7,758
Jefferson	8,444	61.5%	4,799	34.9%	495	3.6%	3,645	26.6%	13,738
Jennings	8,069	69.2%	2,810	24.1%	788	6.8%	5,259	45.1%	11,667
Johnson	47,249	61.4%	25,361	33.0%	4,341	5.6%	21,888	28.4%	76,951
Knox	9,880	68.8%	3,813	26.6%	658	4.6%	6,067	42.2%	14,351
Kosciusko	23,059	68.6%	8,024	23.9%	2,544	7.6%	15,035	44.7%	33,627
LaGrange	7,143	71.7%	2,304	23.1%	510	5.1%	4,839	48.6%	9,957
Lake	88,280	44.2%	107,417	53.8%	4,129	2.1%	-19,137	-9.6%	199,826
LaPorte	23,534	52.1%	19,850	43.9%	1,785	3.9%	3,684	8.2%	45,169
Lawrence	13,626	66.9%	5,234	25.7%	1,509	7.4%	8,392	41.2%	20,369
Madison	31,023	55.9%	21,266	38.3%	3,234	5.8%	9,757	17.6%	55,523
Marion	118,511	33.5%	222,440	63.0%	12,311	2.5%	-103,929	-29.5%	353,262
Marshall	12,298	64.9%	5,543	29.2%	1,120	5.9%	6,755	35.7%	18,961
Martin	2,787	57.0%	1,305	26.7%	799	16.3%	1,482	30.3%	4,891
Miami	8,834	65.7%	3,647	27.1%	965	7.2%	5,187	38.6%	13,446
Monroe	19,961	34.1%	36,675	62.6%	1,945	3.3%	-16,714	-28.5%	58,581
Montgomery	10,742	65.0%	4,441	26.9%	1,348	8.2%	6,301	38.1%	16,531
Morgan	22,915	67.2%	8,159	23.9%	3,033	8.9%	14,756	43.3%	34,107
Newton	4,625	70.7%	1,607	24.6%	308	4.7%	3,018	46.1%	6,540
Noble	12,365	67.7%	4,665	25.6%	1,227	6.7%	7,700	42.1%	18,257
Ohio	2,215	73.2%	720	23.8%	89	2.9%	1,495	49.4%	3,024
Orange	5,504	66.5%	2,289	27.7%	478	5.8%	3,215	38.8%	8,271
Owen	6,191	64.9%	2,397	25.1%	956	10.0%	3,794	39.8%	9,544
Parke	4,503	71.0%	1,478	23.3%	361	5.7%	3,025	47.7%	6,342
Perry	4,870	59.3%	3,085	37.6%	253	3.1%	1,785	21.7%	8,208
Pike	4,009	70.1%	1,402	24.5%	305	5.3%	2,607	45.6%	5,716
Porter	44,035	51.7%	38,764	45.5%	2,397	2.8%	5,271	6.2%	85,196
Posey	8,875	68.7%	3,667	28.4%	382	3.0%	5,208	40.3%	12,924
Pulaski	3,622	65.7%	1,408	25.6%	480	8.7%	2,214	40.1%	5,510
Putnam	10,675	66.0%	4,138	25.6%	1,373	8.5%	6,537	40.4%	16,186
Randolph	6,821	67.8%	2,667	26.5%	573	5.7%	4,154	41.3%	10,061
Ripley	10,741	75.0%	2,927	20.4%	649	4.5%	7,814	54.6%	14,317
Rush	4,933	66.9%	1,912	25.9%	533	7.2%	3,021	41.0%	7,378
Scott	5,627	56.8%	3,928	39.7%	345	3.5%	1,699	17.1%	9,900
Shelby	12,160	64.3%	5,236	27.7%	1,527	8.1%	6,924	36.6%	18,923
Spencer	6,691	66.6%	2,979	29.6%	380	3.8%	3,712	37.0%	10,050
St. Joseph	52,056	47.2%	54,911	49.8%	3,376	3.1%	-2,855	-2.6%	110,343
Starke	6,426	65.5%	2,557	26.0%	834	8.5%	3,869	39.5%	9,817
Steuben	10,382	66.2%	4,583	29.2%	714	4.6%	5,799	37.0%	15,679
Sullivan	5,657	67.0%	2,284	27.1%	496	5.9%	3,373	39.9%	8,437
Switzerland	3,020	72.3%	1,020	24.4%	135	3.2%	2,000	47.9%	4,175
Tippecanoe	29,053	45.5%	31,748	49.7%	3,079	4.8%	-2,695	-4.2%	63,880
Tipton	5,103	66.3%	2,048	26.6%	550	7.1%	3,055	39.7%	7,701
Union	2,535	73.7%	771	22.4%	134	3.9%	1,764	51.3%	3,440
Vanderburgh	40,270	54.8%	31,408	42.8%	1,756	2.4%	8,862	12.0%	74,434
Vermillion	4,382	63.2%	2,052	29.6%	495	7.1%	2,330	33.6%	6,929
Vigo	21,814	53.8%	17,076	42.1%	1,664	4.1%	4,738	11.7%	40,554
Wabash	9,158	67.9%	3,384	25.1%	941	7.0%	5,774	42.8%	13,483
Warren	3,045	70.1%	1,011	23.3%	290	6.7%	2,034	46.8%	4,346
Warrick	19,986	62.9%	10,917	34.4%	875	2.7%	9,069	28.5%	31,778
Washington	8,613	68.6%	3,264	26.0%	681	5.4%	5,349	42.6%	12,558
Wayne	15,907	60.1%	9,320	35.2%	1,248	4.7%	6,587	24.9%	26,475
Wells	9,977	72.1%	2,984	21.6%	879	6.4%	6,993	50.5%	13,840
White	6,947	63.6%	3,169	29.0%	810	7.4%	3,778	44.6%	10,926
Whitley	11,550	67.3%	4,316	25.2%	1,294	7.5%	7,234	42.1%	17,160
Totals	1,566,081	54.38%	1,183,741	41.11%	129,833	4.51%	382,340	13.27%	2,879,655

Counties that flipped from Republican to Democratic

- St. Joseph (largest municipality: South Bend)
- Tippecanoe (largest municipality: Lafayette)

==== By congressional district ====
Braun won seven of nine congressional districts.

District	Braun	McCormick	Representative
1st	47%	51%	Frank J. Mrvan
2nd	58%	37%	Rudy Yakym
3rd	60%	34%	Jim Banks (118th Congress)
3rd	60%	34%	Marlin Stutzman (119th Congress)
4th	58%	36%	Jim Baird
5th	54%	42%	Victoria Spartz
6th	60%	35%	Greg Pence (118th Congress)
6th	60%	35%	Jefferson Shreve (119th Congress)
7th	27%	70%	André Carson
8th	62%	33%	Larry Bucshon (118th Congress)
8th	62%	33%	Mark Messmer (119th Congress)
9th	59%	37%	Erin Houchin

== Notes ==
Partisan clients

== See also ==
- 2024 United States gubernatorial elections
