= Senator Gutman =

Senator Gutman may refer to:

- Alberto Gutman (1959–2019), Florida State Senate
- Daniel Gutman (1901–1993), New York State Senate
- Phillip E. Gutman (1930–2017), Indiana State Senate
