= Senator Fair (disambiguation) =

James G. Fair (1831–1894) was a U.S. Senator from Nevada from 1881 to 1887. Senator Fair may also refer to:

- Mike Fair (South Carolina politician) (born 1946), South Carolina State Senate
- Robert James Fair (1919–2002), Indiana State Senate
