= Robert Fair =

Robert Fair may refer to:

- Robert Fair (Canadian politician) (1891–1954), Canadian farmer and politician
- Robert James Fair (1919–2002), American politician from Indiana
- Robert Leahy Fair (1923–1983), U.S. Army general
