= Bradley B. Chambers =

American businessman and politician

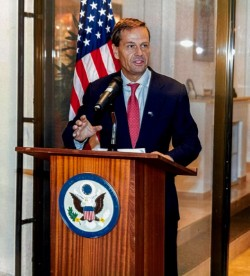

Indiana Secretary of Commerce
- In office July 6, 2021 – August 6, 2023
- Governor: Eric Holcomb
- Succeeded by: David Rosenberg
- Preceded by: Jim Schellinger

Personal details
- Born: June 25, 1964 (age 62) Indianapolis, Indiana
- Party: Republican
- Spouse: Carolyn Chambers
- Children: 1 (son)
- Education: Indiana University Bloomington

Bradley Buckingham Chambers (born June 25, 1964) is an American businessman and former Indiana Secretary of Commerce, serving from 2021 to 2023. A member of the Republican Party, he unsuccessfully sought the Republican nomination for governor of Indiana in 2024.

== Early life ==
Chambers graduated from Lawrence Central High School in Indianapolis, Indiana. He received his Bachelor of Science from Indiana University Bloomington, majoring in Finance, where he also founded his real estate investment firm, Buckingham Companies.

== Buckingham Companies ==
Chambers founded Buckingham Companies, a national real estate investment firm, as a student at Indiana University Bloomington in 1984.

He currently serves as the president and CEO. The company's portfolio exceeds $3 billion and has assets in nine states.

=== Buckingham Foundation, Inc. ===
Formed in 2003, Chambers and his wife, Carol, established the Buckingham Foundation, which contributes annual funding to the mission areas of affordable housing, arts & culture, and economic development.

== Public service ==
=== Indiana Secretary of Commerce ===
Chambers was appointed as Indiana Secretary of Commerce and CEO of the Indiana Economic Development Corporation (IEDC) by Governor Holcomb in June 2021 under a two-year contract, serving for just $1 per year.

As a result of Chambers' leadership during his two-year tenure, the state of Indiana attracted historic inflows of committed capital investment, including $15B of investment in electric vehicle battery manufacturing by Samsung SDI and eight microelectronics investments, including SK Hynix's $4B investment at Purdue University.

As Secretary of Commerce and CEO of the Indiana Economic Development Authority, Chambers also led the launch and deployment of Indiana's Regional Economic Acceleration & Development Initiative (READI), a program to “promote strategic investments that will make Indiana a magnet for talent and economic growth”. When the program officially kicked off in June 2022, Chambers stated that the “unprecedented initiative sets the national standard for grassroots regional collaboration and development.” The READI program in total funded over $1B into 17 regions throughout the state with a leveraged economic impact more than $12B.

==== LEAP Lebanon Innovation District ====
Additionally, under Secretary Chambers' leadership, Indiana and the Indiana Economic Development Authority created the state's first megasite for research and innovation, known as the LEAP (Limitless Exploration/Advanced Pace. ) Lebanon Innovation District.

Situated in Boone County along I-65, the 10,000-plus-acre district is located roughly halfway between Indianapolis and Discovery Park (Purdue) and has been compared to Research Triangle. According to the IEDC, the district offers “diverse settings—megasite, advanced manufacturing, mixed-use and corporate campus—all on an SSI-certified (Strategic Site Inventory) site.”

In May 2022, Eli Lilly and Company announced it would invest $4B in a manufacturing site at the district and create 500 new jobs, with an additional four indirect jobs for every position the company created, becoming the first company to locate within the district. In April 2024, the company announced it would invest an additional $4B at the site and create 500 more jobs, making the largest manufacturing investment at a single location in the company's history. At the time, Chambers noted "the future is bright at Lilly LEAP Lebanon."

The district has faced criticism from residents in Boone County as well as Tippecanoe County, home to a potential source of water for the district, the Wabash Alluvial Aquifer. In September 2023, the IEDC released initial findings of a central Indiana water study that indicated “that the aquifer will be able to support central Indiana demand without impacting the aquifer of the Wabash River.”

==== Indiana Global Economic Summit ====
During Secretary Chambers tenure, in May 2022, the IEDC sponsored its first global economic summit to showcase the Indiana economy and tell "the Indiana story to the world" an event co-hosted by Governor Holcomb and Secretary Chambers. The multi-day event featured 75 speakers, 30 international delegations and 900 registrants, including industry leaders and foreign dignitaries.

During the summit, Chambers announced the creation of the state-level Accelerating Microelectronics Production & Development Task Force (AMPD) in an effort to make Indiana a leader in the semiconductor industry, noting the state's "deep advanced manufacturing DNA."

==== Global Entrepreneurship Congress ====
Entrepreneurship was a focus for Secretary Chambers, leading to record breaking results in the areas of Indiana's small business development efforts and the recruitment of the Global Entrepreneurship Congress to Indiana in 2025.

==== U.S. Investment Advisory Council ====
As Indiana's commerce Secretary, Chambers was appointed to the United States Investment Advisory Council by United States Secretary of Commerce Gina Raimondo in August 2022. The council was first chartered in April 2016 and serves as the principal advisory body to the commerce secretary on the promotion and retention of foreign direct investment to the United States.

=== Indiana State Fair Commission ===
Chambers was appointed as chairman of the Indiana State Fair Commission by Indiana Governor Eric Holcomb in March 2018. He served until taking on the role of Indiana secretary of commerce in August 2021.

== 2024 Indiana Republican gubernatorial primary campaign ==
In August 2023, after months of speculation, Chambers launched his campaign for the Republican nomination for governor of Indiana and became the last candidate to enter the race. His campaign focused heavily on economic issues, including wage growth and economic growth, repeatedly stating he believes “the number one job of a governor is to grow the state’s economy.”

He was endorsed by former Indiana 5th Congressional District Congresswoman Susan Brooks, Michael Andretti, Fishers Mayor Scott Fadness and former Lawrence Mayor Steve Collier. He was also endorsed by Recenter Indiana PAC, the political action committee of the bipartisan group Recenter Indiana, whose mission is to “help push Indiana politics back to the center.”

He released multiple policies throughout the campaign on online safety for children, public safety, China, education and the economy.

As a first time politician, Chambers had broad support from the business community and funded a substantial portion of his own campaign finishing third in the six-way primary with 17.5% of the vote behind United States Senator for Indiana Mike Braun (39.5%) and Lieutenant Governor of Indiana Suzanne Crouch (21.7%).

== See also ==
- 2024 Indiana gubernatorial election
