= Steve Braun (politician) =

American businessman and politician (1959–2022)

Commissioner of the Indiana Department of Workforce Development
- In office November 24, 2014 – August 30, 2017
- Governor: Mike Pence; Eric Holcomb
- Preceded by: Scott Sanders
- Succeeded by: Fred Payne

Member of the Indiana House of Representatives from the 24th district
- In office November 7, 2012 – November 19, 2014
- Preceded by: Richard McClain
- Succeeded by: Donna Schaibley

Personal details
- Born: November 13, 1959 Jasper, Indiana, U.S.
- Died: November 18, 2022 (aged 63) Zionsville, Indiana, U.S.
- Party: Republican
- Spouse: Jennifer
- Relations: Mike Braun (brother)
- Children: 5
- Education: Brown Mackie College; Harvard University (BS)

Steve Braun campaign sign

Steven James Braun (November 13, 1959 – November 18, 2022) was an American businessman and politician from the state of Indiana. A member of the Republican Party, he served in the Indiana House of Representatives from 2012 to 2014.

== Background ==
In 1990, Braun founded Braun Technology Group which was later renamed to Braun Consulting. In 2004, he sold it to Fair Isaac Group.

Braun was the former commissioner of the Indiana Department of Workforce Development. Then-Governor Mike Pence appointed Braun in 2014. In 2017, Braun resigned as commissioner. He ran unsuccessfully for Indiana's 4th congressional district in 2018. The seat was held by Todd Rokita who ran unsuccessfully for U.S. Senate, against Braun's older brother, Mike, in the Republican primary.

It was reported in August 2019 that Braun had officially entered the race for the seat being vacated by Susan Brooks in Indiana's 5th congressional district. He ultimately withdrew after suspending his campaign due to health issues. Republican nominee Victoria Spartz won the seat and took office on January 3, 2021.

Braun died of cancer on November 18, 2022, at the age of 63.

== Personal life ==
Braun and his wife had five children.
