= Liz Brown (politician) =

American politician

Elizabeth Brown

Member of the Indiana Senate from the 15th district
- In office November 18, 2014 – November 4, 2026
- Preceded by: Thomas Wyss
- Succeeded by: Julie McGill

Member of the Fort Wayne City Council from the at-large district
- In office 2008–2012
- Preceded by: Sam Talarico
- Succeeded by: John Crawford

Personal details
- Party: Republican
- Spouse: Steve
- Children: 7
- Education: University of Notre Dame (BS); University of Iowa (JD)

Elizabeth Brown is an American politician from the state of Indiana. A member of the Republican Party, she formerly served in the Indiana State Senate, representing Senate District 15.

Brown is a 1980 graduate of the University of Notre Dame, where she was a varsity athlete on the fencing team. She served on the Fort Wayne City Council for the at-large district from 2008 to 2012, She ran when incumbent City Councilman, Sam Talarico, retired. Brown was succeeded by John Crawford. She ran for Mayor of Fort Wayne in 2011, but lost the primary. Brown was first elected to the Indiana Senate in 2014. She ran for the United States House of Representatives for Indiana's 3rd congressional district in the 2016 elections. She lost the primary to Jim Banks.

== Political positions ==
=== Guns ===
In the 2021 Legislative session, Senator Brown in her role as chair of the Judiciary Committee refused to allow a vote on Constitutional carry to occur, effectively killing the measure for the year.
