= Greg Walker (politician) =

American politician

Member of the Indiana Senate from the 41st district
- In office November 8, 2006 – November 4, 2026
- Preceded by: Robert D. Garton
- Succeeded by: Michelle Davis

Personal details
- Born: December 1, 1963 (age 62) Columbus, Indiana, U.S.
- Party: Republican
- Spouse: Allison
- Children: 4
- Education: Indiana University (BA); Indiana Wesleyan University (MBA)

Greggory Walker (born December 1, 1963) is a Republican member and formerly served in the Indiana State Senate, representing all of Bartholomew County and most of Johnson County. He was first elected in 2006 after ousting Robert D. Garton, the Senate's sitting president pro tempore, in the Republican primary.

In August 2025, Walker announced that he would not pursue reelection to the Indiana Senate. He changed his mind in January 2026, announcing his reelection campaign.

Walker opposed President Donald Trump's 2025 effort to redistrict Indiana. He accused Trump of violating the Hatch Act by using a federal employee to pressure legislators into redistricting. Walker ran for re-election but lost to State Rep Michelle Davis, he was one of the 5 Republican incumbents to lose renomination in the 2026 elections
