= Julie McGill =

American politician

Member of the Indiana Senate from the 15th district
- Incumbent
- Assumed office November 4, 2026
- Preceded by: Liz Brown

Personal details
- Party: Democratic

Julie McGill is an American politician who is the Member of the Indiana State Senate from the 15th district since 2026.
