= Jim Schellinger =

American politician

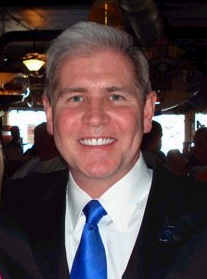

Indiana Secretary of Commerce
- In office 2017 – March 3, 2021
- Governor: Mike Pence
- Preceded by: Victor Smith
- Succeeded by: Brad Chambers

Personal details
- Party: Democratic
- Education: University of Notre Dame

Jim Schellinger is the former Secretary of Commerce for the state of Indiana.

== Early life ==
Schellinger was raised the sixth of eight children in South Bend, Indiana. He attended St. Joseph High School, where he played for the school's football and baseball teams. He attended the University of Notre Dame, earning a degree in architecture.

== 2008 campaign ==
On March 19, 2007, he filed his candidacy to run for governor against incumbent Republican Mitch Daniels but lost to fellow Democratic challenger Jill Long Thompson by 13,000 votes - less than 1 percent. When Schellinger joined the race for governor he was the second of three Democratic candidates in the primary race, along with Richard Young and Jill Long Thompson. He is described as a "moderate Democrat." Schellinger had received early endorsements from Congresswoman Julia Carson, Indianapolis Mayor Bart Peterson, and by the UAW. Schellinger raised $1.2 million during the second financial quarter, but was not able to beat Long Thompson despite her being outspent by a significant margin.
