= Mike Braun =

Governor of Indiana since 2025

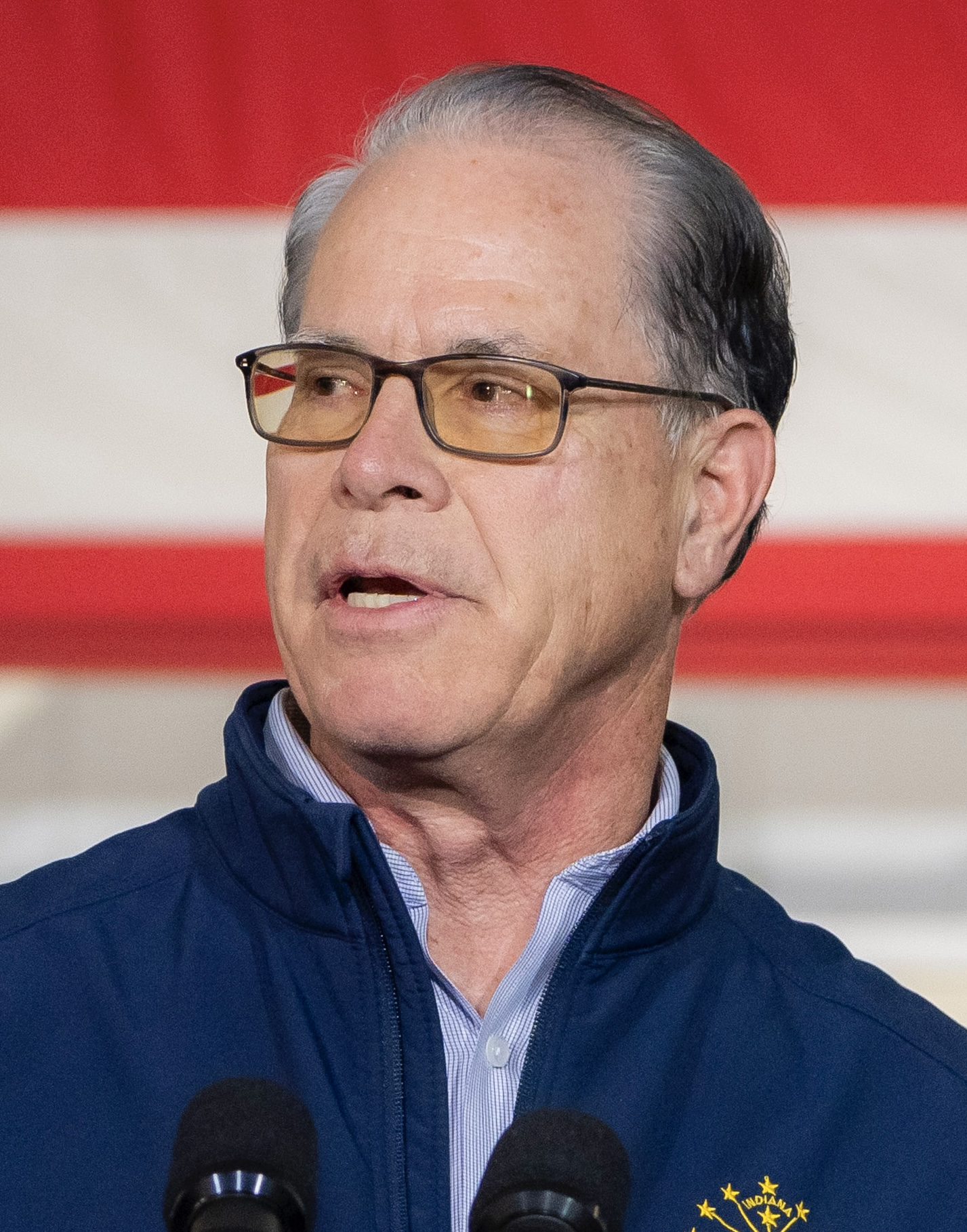
- Braun in 2025

52nd Governor of Indiana
- Incumbent
- Assumed office January 13, 2025
- Lieutenant: Micah Beckwith
- Preceded by: Eric Holcomb

Ranking Member of the Senate Aging Committee
- In office January 3, 2023 – January 3, 2025
- Preceded by: Tim Scott
- Succeeded by: Kirsten Gillibrand

United States Senator from Indiana
- In office January 3, 2019 – January 3, 2025
- Preceded by: Joe Donnelly
- Succeeded by: Jim Banks

Member of the Indiana House of Representatives from the 63rd district
- In office November 5, 2014 – November 1, 2017
- Preceded by: Mark Messmer
- Succeeded by: Shane Lindauer

Member of the Jasper School Board
- In office 2004–2014
- Succeeded by: Arlet Jackle

Personal details
- Born: Michael Kent Braun; March 24, 1954 (age 72) Jasper, Indiana, U.S.
- Party: Republican (2012–present)
- Other political affiliations: Democratic (before 2012)
- Spouse: Maureen Burger (m. 1976)
- Children: 4
- Relatives: Steve Braun (brother)
- Education: Wabash College (BA); Harvard University (MBA)
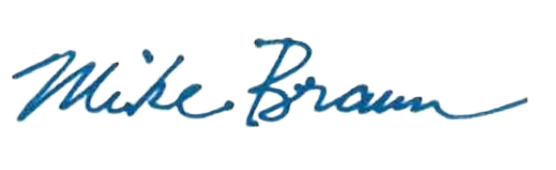
- Signature
- Website: Office website Campaign website
- Braun's voice Braun on the passing of Rep. Jackie Walorski; Recorded August 6, 2022

Michael Kent Braun (born March 24, 1954) is an American businessman and politician serving as the 52nd governor of Indiana since 2025. A member of the Republican Party, he served from 2019 to 2025 as a United States senator from Indiana and from 2014 to 2017 as the representative for the 63rd district in the Indiana House of Representatives.

Born in Jasper, Indiana, Braun graduated from Wabash College with a degree in economics and subsequently earned an MBA from Harvard Business School. After serving in the Indiana House of Representatives from 2014 to 2017, he was elected to the United States Senate in 2018, defeating Democratic incumbent Joe Donnelly. He was elected governor in 2024, defeating Democratic nominee Jennifer McCormick and Libertarian nominee Donald Rainwater by a margin of 13.3%, the highest margin in an open seat election for governor since 1980.

Braun opposes the Affordable Care Act, same-sex marriage, abortion, and a pathway to citizenship for undocumented immigrants. He has called on the Republican Party to take climate change more seriously. He supported President Donald Trump's trade and tariff policies, although he was previously an advocate of free trade. Braun voted to acquit Trump in the impeachment trial related to the Trump–Ukraine scandal.

== Early life, education and business career ==
Michael Kent Braun was born in Jasper, Indiana, on March 24, 1954. He graduated from Jasper High School. He attended the all-male Wabash College, where he was a member of Phi Delta Theta fraternity and graduated summa cum laude with a bachelor's degree in economics, and Harvard Business School, where he earned a Master of Business Administration.

After graduating from Harvard, Braun moved back to Indiana and joined his wife's family business manufacturing truck bodies for farmers. The business subsequently grew from 15 employees to more than 300. In 1986, Braun and Daryl Rauscher acquired Meyer Body Inc., a manufacturer of truck bodies and distributor of truck parts and equipment. Braun fully acquired the company in 1995 and renamed it Meyer Distributing in 1999. Braun is its president and CEO. In 2018, Braun's personal finance disclosure listed assets worth between $35 million and $96 million.

== Early political career ==
Braun was formerly a member of the Democratic Party, but switched to the Republican Party in 2012. He said that he has always considered himself a conservative Republican, but voted in Democratic primaries for years because his home county, Dubois County, historically voted heavily Democratic downballot. According to Braun, until a massive Republican wave in 2016, even Republican-leaning voters voted in the Democratic primary to have a say in local elections. There is no formal party registration in Indiana, but primary ballot history is used to determine partisan affiliation.

Braun was a member of the Jasper School Board from 2004 to 2014. He was succeeded by Arlet Jackle.

== Indiana State Representative ==
In 2014, Braun was elected to the Indiana House of Representatives, in the 63rd district. He resigned from the state House on November 1, 2017, to focus on his U.S. Senate campaign.

In July 2018, Braun called for the Indiana attorney general, Republican Curtis Hill, to resign amid allegations that Hill had drunkenly groped a lawmaker and three legislative staffers.

== U.S. Senate ==
=== 2018 election ===
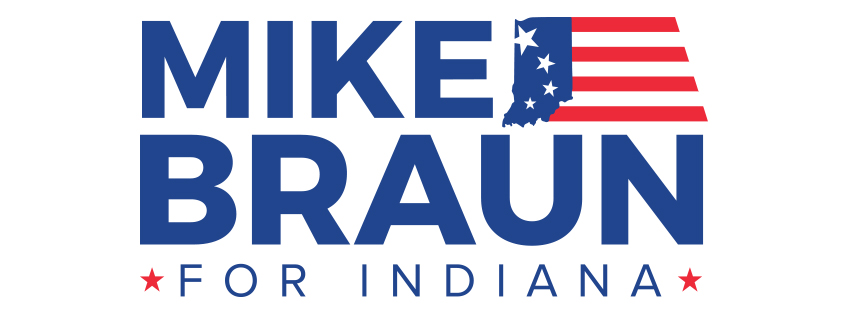
Mike Braun senate campaign, 2018

Braun won the Republican primary for the United States Senate in the 2018 election, defeating U.S. representatives Todd Rokita and Luke Messer by over 56,000 votes. He received 208,520 votes, roughly 41% of the total. Braun ran as an outsider, emphasizing his career in business. He defeated Democratic incumbent Joe Donnelly in the November general election with 51% of the vote to Donnelly's 45%; the Libertarian candidate, Lucy Brenton, tallied less than 4%. In late 2019, the Indianapolis Star reported that Braun's 2018 campaign was the beneficiary of $2.8 million in spending by a political action committee with strong connections to indicted money launderer Lev Parnas and one of his shell companies. Parnas supplied photographs of him and Braun embracing at a 2018 campaign event to the House of Representatives as part of his cooperation with the impeachment of President Trump. They were made public in January 2020.

=== Tenure ===
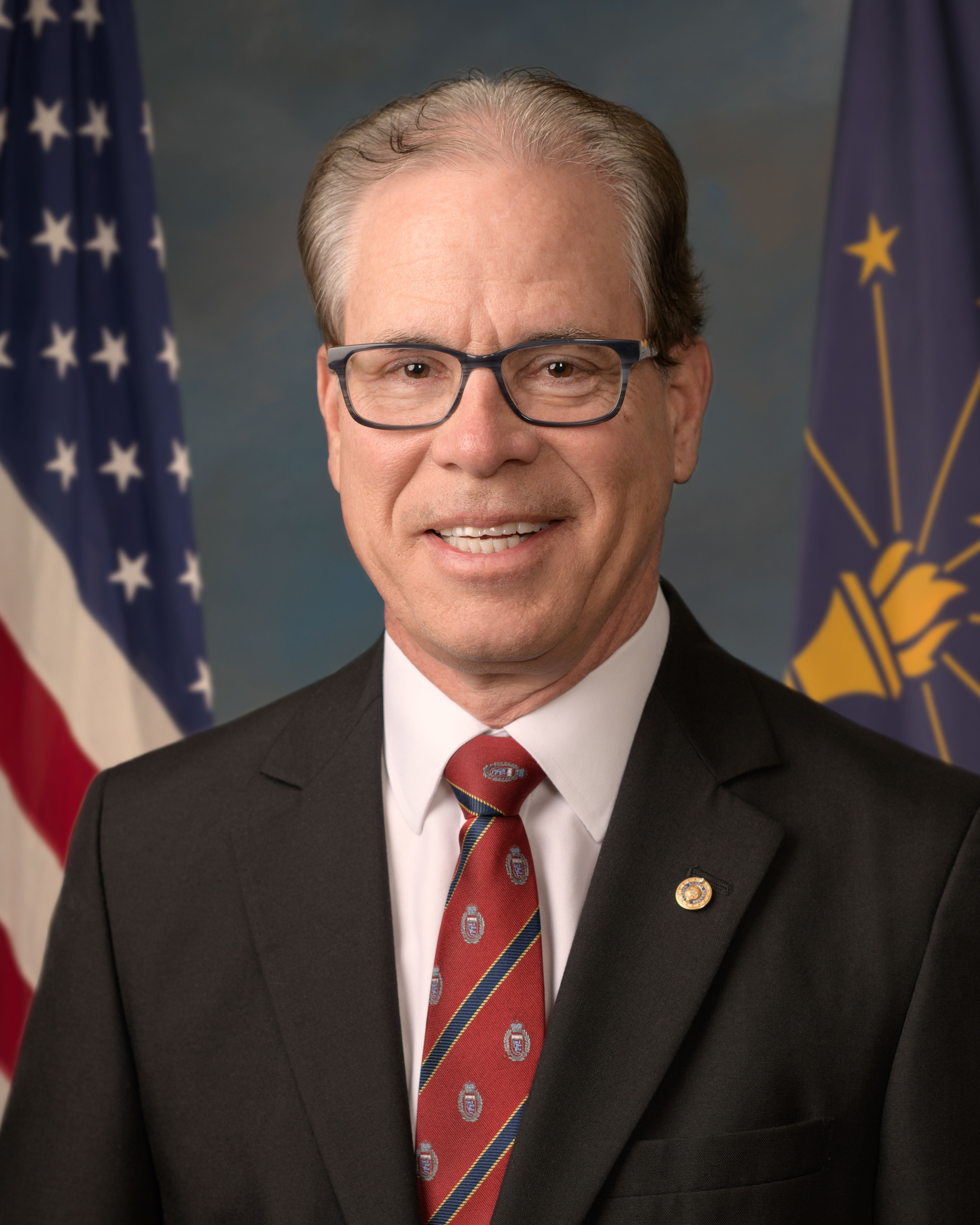
Braun during the 116th Congress

On January 3, 2019, Braun was sworn in as the junior United States senator from Indiana by Vice President Mike Pence.

In May 2019, Braun was one of eight senators who voted against a $19.1 billion emergency aid package for states and territories that endured hurricanes, floods and fires. Braun said the disaster assistance process was "just another path for runaway spending on unrelated projects." Despite his opposition, the package was enacted with bipartisan support and President Trump's approval.

Braun supported Trump's decision to withdraw American troops from northern Syria in October 2019. As a result, in that month, Turkey launched a military offensive against the American-allied Kurds in that area. After that, Braun called Trump "smart"; questioned why the U.S. should "be in the crossfire" between Turkey and the Kurds; and called the idea that ISIS would recover strength as a result of the conflict "an assumption".

In December 2019, Braun said that the impeachment inquiry against Donald Trump had been a "disaster for Democrats."

In May 2020, Senator Chuck Schumer put forth a resolution to officially release the guidance by the Centers for Disease Control and Prevention (CDC) on how to safely lift restrictions related to the COVID-19 pandemic in the United States. A leaked version of the guidance showed that it was more detailed and restrictive than the White House recommendations released in April 2020. Braun blocked Schumer's resolution, saying that the CDC's recommendations would hinder the economy.

On October 26, 2020, Braun voted to confirm Judge Amy Coney Barrett to the Supreme Court, and praised Barrett.

After Joe Biden defeated Trump in the November 2020 election, Braun refused to acknowledge Trump's defeat and promoted Trump's false claims of election fraud. Along with 10 other sitting and incoming Republican senators, Braun announced on January 2, 2021, that he would vote against counting the electoral votes from a number of states won by Biden four days later, seeking to subvert the election outcome. He was participating in the joint session of Congress counting the electoral votes when a mob of Trump supporters attacked the U.S. Capitol. In the wake of the attack, he tweeted, "Though I will continue to push for a thorough investigation into the election irregularities many Hoosiers are concerned with as my objection was intended, I have withdrawn that objection and will vote to get this ugly day behind us." He voted to count the electoral votes after Congress returned to session. The South Bend Tribune called Braun's flip-flop "a case of too little, too late." The Democratic Party of Indiana called for Braun's resignation, saying he "incited violence to overturn the presidential election and end American democracy."

In 2022, it was reported that rather than seeking reelection to the Senate, Braun would run for governor of Indiana in 2024. Incumbent Republican governor Eric Holcomb was term-limited.

=== Committee assignments ===
For the 118th United States Congress, Braun was named to four Senate committees:

- Committee on Agriculture, Nutrition, and Forestry
  - Subcommittee on Food and Nutrition, Specialty Crops, Organics, and Research (Ranking)
  - Subcommittee on Rural Development and Energy
- Committee on Health, Education, Labor, and Pensions
  - Subcommittee on Employment and Workplace Safety (Ranking)
  - Subcommittee on Primary Health and Retirement Security
- Committee on the Budget
- Special Committee on Aging (Ranking)

=== Caucus membership ===
- Senate Republican Conference
- Congressional Coalition on Adoption
- Rare Disease Caucus

== Governor of Indiana (2025–present) ==
=== Elections ===
==== 2024 ====
On November 30, 2022, Braun filed papers with the Secretary of State of Indiana to run in the 2024 Indiana gubernatorial election, following speculation since September that he would run for the office.

Braun, who was endorsed by Donald Trump, won the Republican primary on May 7, 2024. On May 8, he announced his choice for lieutenant governor, state representative Julie McGuire. In June, delegates nominated Micah Beckwith for lieutenant governor at the Republican state convention.

On September 30, 2024, the Braun for Governor campaign released an ad that contained an image altered to show Democratic opponent Jennifer McCormick leading a rally with people holding signs stating "No Gas Stoves." The image actually showed people holding "McCormick for Governor" signs. Running an ad with an altered image may be illegal under Indiana State Law HEA 1133. Later that day, the Braun campaign released an updated version of the ad with a disclaimer noting the use of an altered image which complies with the law.

On November 5, Braun won Indiana's gubernatorial election by the largest margin for an open governor's seat since 1980. He ran on a campaign of "Freedom and Opportunity", promising to address rising property taxes, make healthcare more obtainable and affordable, and implement universal school choice.

=== Tenure ===
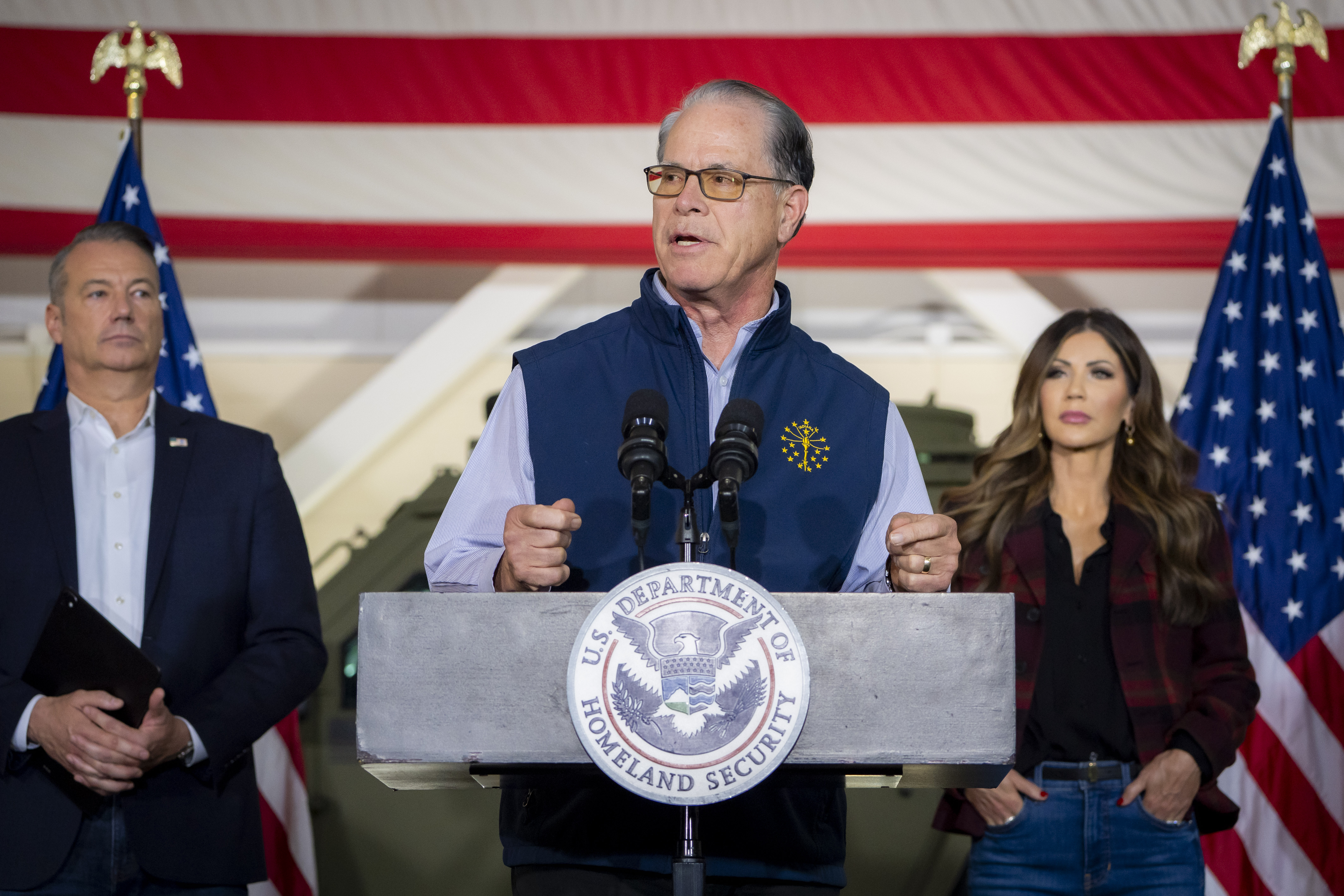
Indiana Gov. Mike Braun speaks alongside Secretary of Homeland Security Kristi Noem and Acting Immigration and Customs Enforcement (ICE) Director Todd Lyons on Operation Midway Blitz in Gary, Indiana, Oct. 30, 2025

Braun became governor on January 13, 2025, sworn in by Indiana Supreme Court Chief Justice Loretta Rush.

==== Higher education appointments ====
In June 2025, Braun intervened in the governance of Indiana University. His administration moved to remove members of the board of trustees elected by alumni and replace them with gubernatorial appointees, a move critics described as an effort to increase political control over the university. Braun defended the decision, despite having said a month earlier that he would not intervene in the trustee process.

==== 2025 Indiana redistricting ====
In October 2025, Indiana lawmakers began considering redrawing the state's congressional districts to reduce Democratic representation in the United States House of Representatives. The push, called for by President Donald Trump and favored by Braun, succeeded in the Indiana House of Representatives but failed in the Indiana State Senate. After the resolution failed, Trump and Braun vowed to endorse primary challengers to the Republican state senators who voted against redistricting.

== Political positions ==
=== Abortion ===
Braun opposes abortion. He tweeted in support of the 2022 overturning of Roe v. Wade.

=== Donald Trump ===
According to FiveThirtyEight, Braun voted with Donald Trump's position 90.9% of the time between Braun's inauguration and Trump's departure from office two years later.

During Trump's first impeachment and impeachment trial, regarding the Trump–Ukraine scandal, Braun became one of Trump's most prominent defenders, defending him in many media appearances. He voted to acquit Trump, and when asked whether it is acceptable for Trump to withhold U.S. foreign aid to coerce a foreign leader to investigate Joe Biden, he said that he did not believe that such behavior was proper but that "it didn't happen." Braun also said that Trump did what he did out of a desire to reduce corruption in Ukraine. After Trump was acquitted, Braun said that Trump "hopefully" learned something from the trial.

=== Congressional reform ===
Braun opposes earmarks. He introduced an amendment to the Consolidated Appropriations Act of 2023 to remove all earmarks from the bill, saying: "Earmarks give representatives, give senators the incentive to be big spenders. We should cut every earmark out of this bill and ban them permanently and quit loading up our kids and grandkids with the debt to pay for all this." The amendment failed.

==== Effort to overturn 2020 presidential election result ====
After Biden won the 2020 presidential election, Trump refused to concede and made baseless claims of election fraud. Braun defended, and joined in, Trump's attempt to overturn the election results. He wrote a Washington Examiner editorial criticizing the media for not taking accusations of voter fraud seriously. Along with 10 other Republican senators, Braun initially pledged to object to the counting of the electoral votes in several key states. After the storming of the Capitol by violent pro-Trump rioters, Braun reversed himself and voted against objections to the election results, saying that he "didn't feel comfortable with today's events."

In Trump's second impeachment trial, on charges of incitement of insurrection, Braun voted to acquit Trump.

On May 28, 2021, Braun abstained from voting on the creation of an independent commission to investigate the January 6 storming of the Capitol.

=== Economy ===
Braun supported the Republican Party's tax legislation in 2017. When asked "The nonpartisan Congressional Budget Office says the tax cuts are increasing U.S. debt. Would you vote to cut spending on some programs in order to pay for them?", Braun replied, "Tax cuts are a revenue-neutral way to get our economy roaring again, but the federal government doesn't have a revenue problem; it has a spending problem."

Braun was among the 31 Senate Republicans who voted against final passage of the Fiscal Responsibility Act of 2023.

=== Education ===
In June 2025, Braun worked to increase his control over Indiana University by removing members of the board of trustees elected by alumni and replacing them with his own appointees. A month earlier, he had said he would not do so.

=== Environmentalism ===
Braun is a self-described conservationist. He has called Swedish climate activist Greta Thunberg an "inspiration" and advocated that the Republican Party be more aggressive in combating climate change. He opposed the 2015 Paris climate change agreement, but supports using reforestation, carbon pricing, and carbon capture to reduce or mitigate carbon dioxide emissions. He also co-chaired the bipartisan Senate Climate Solutions Caucus, which he and Chris Coons founded in October 2019. Braun sponsored the Growing Climate Solutions Act, a bill that would make it simpler for farmers to sell carbon credits on existing carbon trading markets in California and in the Northeast.

=== Foreign policy ===
In January 2024, Braun voted against a resolution, proposed by Senator Bernie Sanders, to apply the human rights provisions of the Foreign Assistance Act to U.S. aid to Israel's military. The proposal was defeated, 72 to 11.

=== Trade ===
In 2018, Braun supported Trump's trade and tariff policies, saying that they have "yielded phenomenal results." Previously, he supported free trade policies.

Braun voted in support of the United States–Mexico–Canada Agreement.

=== Health care ===
Braun opposes the Affordable Care Act (ACA), supports efforts to repeal it, and supports a lawsuit to strike down the entirety of the ACA. Braun has called for "free-market competition" and "market-driven" solutions on health care. During his 2018 Senate campaign, he criticized incumbent Democratic Senator Joe Donnelly as a "defender of Obamacare." Braun expressed support for keeping in place protections for individuals with preexisting conditions (a popular provision of the ACA), although both House repeal efforts supported by Braun and the lawsuit supported by Braun would effectively end protections for individuals with preexisting conditions.

=== Immigration ===
Braun has said, "building the wall must be the first step to any solution" on illegal immigration. He opposes a pathway to citizenship for undocumented immigrants who came to the United States as minors, known as DREAMers.

=== LGBT+ rights ===
Asked for his view on the legalization of same-sex marriage, Braun said, "I believe in traditional marriage." He fought to keep marriage defined as "between a man and a woman" in the Indiana Republican Party platform. In the Indiana state legislature, he supported the Indiana Religious Freedom Restoration Act and opposed amendments to the bill that would have banned discrimination based on sexual orientation and gender identity.

In 2026, Braun declared June "Nuclear Family Month" as an alternative to Pride Month.

=== Police reform ===
In June 2020, after the murder of George Floyd, Braun introduced legislation to reform qualified immunity, a legal doctrine that shields police officers from lawsuits over constitutional violations if the violated constitutional right has not been clearly established in a previous court decision. His legislation would have made it easier to sue police officers for rights violations. But after an interview with Tucker Carlson and backlash from police unions the next month, Braun dropped his bill. In May 2021, he wrote, "I oppose any reform to the current doctrine of qualified immunity" and opposed federal efforts to reform local police departments.

=== COVID-19 pandemic ===
In September 2021, Braun opposed the planned COVID-19 vaccine mandate for companies with more than 100 employees, calling it the "biggest overreach by federal government I've seen". He was the author of the Senate disapproval resolution challenging President Biden's OSHA vaccine mandate for businesses. The Senate passed the resolution under the Congressional Review Act in a bipartisan vote. In October 2021, Braun invited Chicago police officers who were suspended for refusing to get vaccinated against COVID-19 to work in Indiana, saying, "plenty of departments are hiring now".

=== Interracial marriage ===
In a March 2022 Senate Judiciary Committee hearing for U.S. Supreme Court nominee Ketanji Brown Jackson, Braun said the Court's decision Roe v. Wade was a case of "judicial activism" and "legislating from the bench". A reporter then asked if Braun applied the same reasoning to the Loving v. Virginia case that installed federal protections on interracial marriage. Braun responded, "many of the Supreme Court's civil rights decisions have improperly established federal rights that would be better handled on a state-by-state basis." He was then asked whether interracial marriage should be left to the states, and replied, "Yes." Later that day, Braun put out a statement saying he had misunderstood the question and that there was "no question that the Constitution prohibits discrimination of any kind based on race. That is not something that is even up for debate, and I condemn racism in any form, at all levels and by any states, entities, or individuals."

=== Data centers ===
Braun has supported the construction and development of data centers, but has said they must protect local utility customers and water resources. He has signed the Ratepayer Protection Pledge.

=== Early childhood learning ===
In February 2025, Braun declined to support a state 50% match for Dolly Parton's Imagination Library. Dollywood Foundation President Jeff Conyers said, "We are hopeful that Governor Braun and the Indiana Legislature will continue this vital investment by restoring the state's funding match for local Imagination Library programs."

== Electoral history ==
Indiana gubernatorial election, 2024
Party	Candidate	Votes	%	±%
Republican	Mike Braun Micah Beckwith	1,566,081	54.38	−2.13
Democratic	Jennifer McCormick Terry Goodin	1,183,741	41.11	+9.06
Libertarian	Donald Rainwater Tonya Hudson	129,439	4.52	−6.92
Write-in	Christopher Ryan Stried	52	0.0%	N/A
Total votes		2,865,801	100.00	
Republican hold				

Republican gubernatorial primary, Indiana, 2024
Party	Candidate	Votes	%
Republican	Mike Braun	236,641	39.6
Republican	Suzanne Crouch	130,146	21.8
Republican	Brad Chambers	104,653	17.5
Republican	Eric Doden	71,135	11.9
Republican	Jamie Reitenour	28,757	4.8
Republican	Curtis Hill	26,837	4.5
Total votes		598,169	100.0

United States Senate election in Indiana, 2018
Party	Candidate	Votes	%	±%
Republican	Mike Braun	1,158,000	50.73%	+6.45%
Democratic	Joe Donnelly (incumbent)	1,023,553	44.84%	−5.20%
Libertarian	Lucy Brenton	100,942	4.42%	−1.26%
Write-in		70	<0.01%	N/A
Total votes		2,282,565	100%	N/A
Republican gain from Democratic				

Republican Primary U.S. Senate, Indiana, 2018
Party	Candidate	Votes	%
Republican	Mike Braun	208,497	41.18%
Republican	Todd Rokita	151,904	30.00%
Republican	Luke Messer	145,936	28.82%
Total votes		506,337	100%

Indiana House of Representatives, 63rd District, 2016
Party	Candidate	Votes	%
Republican	Mike Braun (incumbent)	19,228	71.75
Democratic	Andrea Hulsman	7,570	28.25
Total votes		26,798	100.00
Republican hold			

Indiana House of Representatives, 63rd District, 2014
Primary election
Party	Candidate	Votes	%
Republican	Mike Braun	4,611	66.80
Republican	Richard Moss	2,292	33.20
Total votes		6,903	100.00
General election
Republican	Mike Braun	13,329	100.00
Total votes		13,329	100.00
Republican hold			

== Personal life ==
Braun and his wife, Maureen, have four children. He is Catholic. Braun's late brother, Steve Braun, was also a politician in Indiana.

Party political offices
Preceded by Richard Mourdock	Republican nominee for U.S. Senator from Indiana (Class 1); 2018	Succeeded by Jim Banks
Preceded by Eric Holcomb	Republican nominee for Governor of Indiana; 2024	Most recent
U.S. Senate
Preceded by Joe Donnelly	U.S. Senator (Class 1) from Indiana; 2019–2025; Served alongside: Todd Young	Succeeded by Jim Banks
Preceded by Tim Scott	Ranking Member of the Senate Aging Committee; 2023–2025	Succeeded by Kirsten Gillibrand
Political offices
Preceded by Eric Holcomb	Governor of Indiana; 2025–present	Incumbent
U.S. order of precedence (ceremonial)
Preceded by JD Vance as Vice President	Order of precedence of the United States; Within Indiana	Succeeded by Mayor of city in which event is held
Preceded by JD Vance as Vice President	Order of precedence of the United States; Within Indiana	Succeeded by Otherwise Mike Johnson as Speaker of the United States House of Representatives
Preceded by Jeff Landry as Governor of Louisiana	Order of precedence of the United States; Outside Indiana	Succeeded by Tate Reeves as Governor of Mississippi
