= Micah Beckwith =

American politician (born 1982)

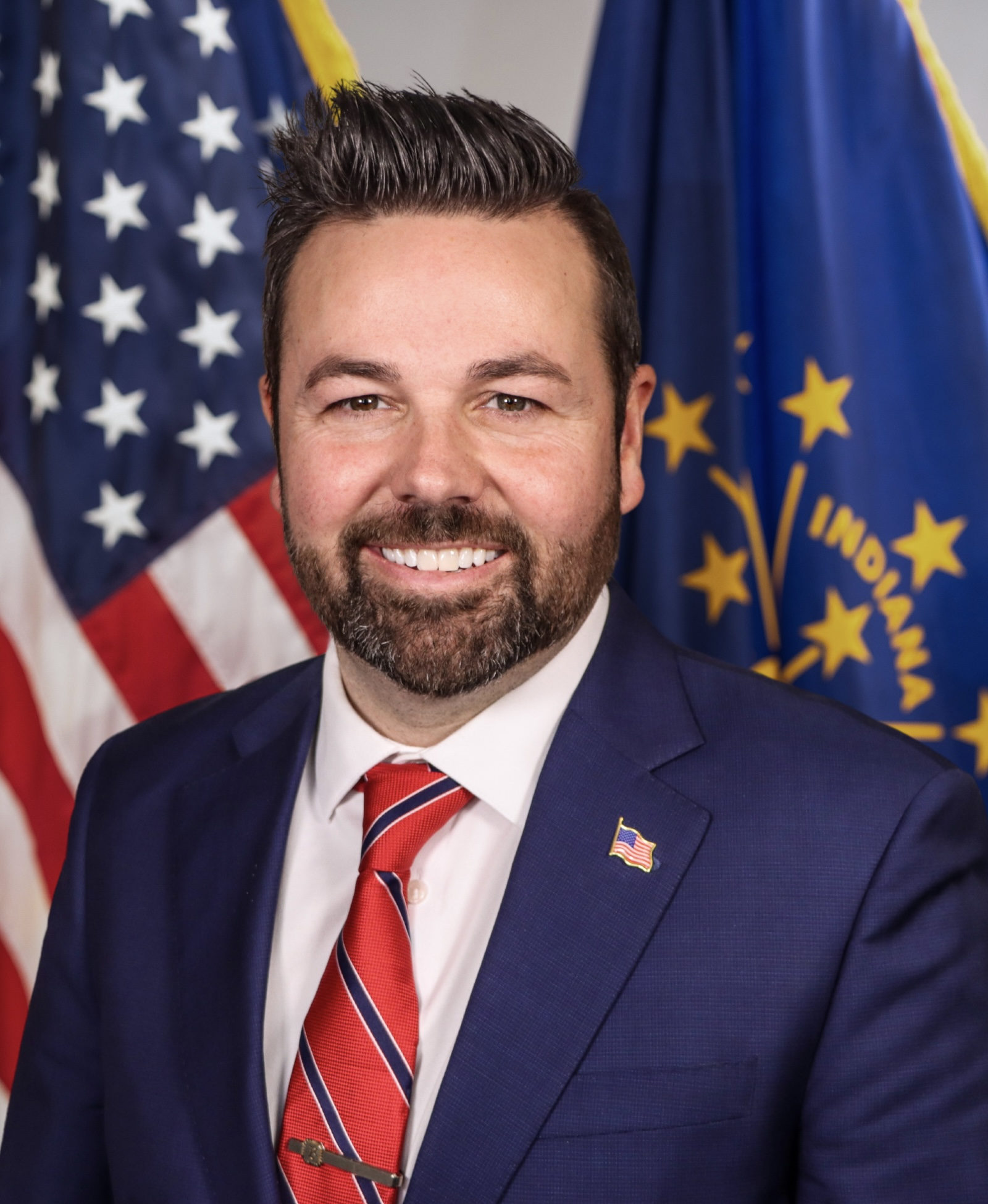
- Official portrait, 2026

53rd Lieutenant Governor of Indiana
- Incumbent
- Assumed office January 13, 2025
- Governor: Mike Braun
- Preceded by: Suzanne Crouch

Personal details
- Born: Micah Beckwith; August 1982 (age 44) Hillsdale, Michigan, U.S.
- Party: Republican
- Spouse: Susan Beckwith
- Children: 2
- Education: Huntington University (BA)

Micah Beckwith (born August 15, 1982) is an American pastor and politician serving since 2025 as the 53rd lieutenant governor of Indiana. A member of the Republican Party, he won the 2024 election as the running mate of Mike Braun.

== Early life and education ==
Beckwith is from Hillsdale, Michigan, and graduated from Huntington University with a Bachelor of Arts in business economics. He is a pastor at Life Church, an Assemblies of God multi-site church based in Noblesville, Indiana.

== Political career ==
Beckwith sought the Republican Party's nomination for Indiana's 5th congressional district in the 2020 United States House of Representatives elections in Indiana. He finished in third place with 12.7% of the vote, losing to Victoria Spartz by 25%.

The Hamilton County Council appointed Beckwith to a vacant seat on the Hamilton East Public Library board of trustees on September 7, 2022. Beckwith's appointment attracted local controversy due to his stated views on LGBTQ issues, and his belief that public school students were being taught "gay" and "oral sex" and being "indoctrinated with Marxist ideology." In comments to The Indianapolis Star, Beckwith denied charges that he had an "agenda to censor books." During his tenure, Beckwith supported revisions to the library's collection development policy that barred materials containing "depictions of sex, violence and repeated profanity" from being shelved in the library's young adult section. Nearly 2,000 titles were relocated as a result of the policy. The board suspended the new policy in August 2023 following public backlash that attracted national press attention and criticism from local authors such as John Green. The board subsequently voted to repeal the new policy in December 2023 following the resignation of several conservative board members. Beckwith resigned from the board of trustees in January 2024 in order to pursue his candidacy for lieutenant governor.

=== Lieutenant Governor of Indiana ===
In 2023, Beckwith announced his candidacy for lieutenant governor of Indiana in the 2024 election. Beckwith faced Julie McGuire for the nomination, and won with 891 votes against McGuire's 828. He won the election on a ticket with U.S. senator Mike Braun, defeating the Democratic Party nominees Jennifer McCormick and Terry Goodin.

During the gubernatorial campaign, Beckwith said that McCormick's campaign and its support of abortion rights and gender-affirming care represented "boldness for immorality" and the "Jezebel spirit", and additionally referred to pro-choice Hoosiers as "demonic". In response, the Indiana Democratic Party called the Braun-Beckwith ticket a "woman hating campaign". Beckwith later said that his comparison of the Indiana Democratic ticket to the Jezebel spirit had "nothing to do with being a woman or not."

In November 2024, Beckwith addressed a story posted in Indiana University's student newspaper, the Indiana Daily Student, in a post on X. The front-page story featured president-elect Donald Trump and critical remarks made about him by former members of his cabinet. He called the IDS story "WOKE propaganda" and wrote that "[t]his type of elitist leftist propaganda needs to stop or we will be happy to stop it for them." In an email to local NBC News affiliate WTHR, Beckwith said he would ensure the IDS "receives no taxpayer support directly or indirectly", though the newspaper's co-editor in chief noted that it receives no taxpayer funds. In a follow-up interview with the IDS, Beckwith stated he would protect the newspaper's free speech rights if he felt the stories run by the paper were "fair".

In April 2025, Democrats in the Indiana Senate argued against Indiana Senate Bill 289, an anti-DEI measure, comparing it to the Three-fifths Compromise. Beckwith responded to the argument by defending the Three-fifths Compromise, calling it "a great move" and saying that the policy "helped to root out slavery". His comments were condemned by the Alliance of Baptists, the Concerned Clergy of Indianapolis, and the Indiana chapter of the National Action Network in a joint statement that called Beckwith's interpretation of the compromise "historical revisionism". Beckwith defended his comments in an interview several days later, stating "I said exactly what needed to be said."

In September 2025, Beckwith, faced backlash from conservative circles after posting on social media about his meeting with Haitian pastors regarding faith and family. In the post, he noted that over 40,000 Haitians were seeking asylum in Indiana, praised their determination to work hard, and encouraged assimilation into the American way of life. Conservative commentators accused him of advocating for mass Haitian migration, he clarified by emphasizing that any Haitians who come must do so legally, learn English, and assimilate. Beckwith said on WOWO, that he has not "flip-flopped" referring to his stance on immigration. In 2024, he described Haitian resettlement in Logansport as a burden on public services, such as schools and hospitals, and emergency response agencies were being stretched thin by “people who should not be here.” He blamed the amount of Haitians in Indiana on then-President Joe Biden extending their temporary protected status. Beckwith subsequently deleted the original post and attributed the backlash to misinterpretation of his message.

In October 2025, Beckwith's office became the subject of a Marion County grand jury investigation into allegations of ghost employment and the distribution of an intimate image. No charges have been filed, and Beckwith's office stated it had no knowledge of the grand jury proceedings due to confidentiality laws.

== Political positions ==
=== Abortion ===
Beckwith opposes abortion. He says that he would consider abortion for instances like rape or incest; if a baby was conceived by rape and was then aborted, then the rapist would be charged for rape and homicide, deterring other rapists from committing rape.

=== Capital punishment ===
According to an Indianapolis Business Journal op-ed Beckwith wrote, he supports the death penalty.

=== Christianity ===
Beckwith identifies as a Christian nationalist.

=== Drug policy reform ===
Beckwith believes cannabis should be legal for medical usage in Indiana.

=== Education ===
Beckwith supports school choice. He campaigned against a school referendum in Avon that raised property taxes.

Beckwith had a public spat with Westfield High School in March 2026. He said that the high school was "slow walking" approval of a Turning Point USA student chapter. The chapter was approved after Beckwith and his office got involved. The next month, he criticized the marching band for playing a rendition of Carmen Fantasy, denouncing the performance as "demonic" and that "Christian conservatives" were being targeted.

Beckwith became involved in a public dispute with Valparaiso Community Schools following his invitation to a career fair at Valparaiso High School. After local media reported that parents alleged Beckwith made disparaging remarks regarding transgender individuals to a group of students after his speech, district Superintendent Jim McCall issued a public apology to families. McCall stated that some of Beckwith's interactions were "offensive," clarified that the district did not endorse his personal views, and noted that schools "are not a platform for any political agenda." Beckwith responded by launching a series of social media posts criticizing McCall's leadership as "weak" and applauded McCall's resignation, framing the apology as an example of a "woke education system" that shielded students from opposing viewpoints. Beckwith utilized the incident to advocate for the expansion of Indiana's school voucher program and school choice policies, arguing that public schools were indoctrinating rather than educating students.

=== Flock cameras ===
Beckwith is against the use of Flock cameras, referring to them as a "direct threat to our Fourth Amendment right". He urged the Fort Wayne city council to vote no on a contract renewal for Flock cameras which the city council voted unanimously against the cameras.

=== Islam ===
In a May 2026 interview on Flashpoint, a show on the network of televangelist Kenneth Copeland, Beckwith said "I am going to call on others to hate [Islam], because I hate Islam. It is a death cult. Now I love Muslims, because they make great Christians when Jesus gets a hold of them, but I hate Islam. And we need to be okay with hating again." After Muslim-American groups, including CAIR accused Beckwith of promoting religious bigotry, Beckwith responded "I love and support all groups of people who come to our country legally and assimilate to our culture. Sharia Law does the exact opposite of that and promotes the destruction of our country, our Constitution, and our way of life. I will never apologize for saying the United States of America is now and always should be one nation under God."

Beckwith, who has a history of anti-Islam social media statements, doubled down on his May, 2026 Flashpoint statements in a social media post on the Muslim holiday of Eid al-Adha: "I would like to take this opportunity to wish all Muslims in Indiana the best. And by best I mean I hope you all become Christian."

In an interview on Blaze Media's Conservative Review podcast, Beckwith said he considered Islam a "more dangerous ideology" than Nazism, argued that Islam is not a religion but a "military and political ideology," and called for government restrictions on Islamic practices, including a ban on the public call to prayer (the adhan) and an investigation into foreign funding of mosques.

== Personal life ==
Beckwith lives in Noblesville, Indiana, with his wife Susan and their two children. Susan was crowned Miss Indiana in 2005.

Party political offices
Preceded by Suzanne Crouch	Republican nominee for Lieutenant Governor of Indiana; 2024	Most recent
Political offices
Preceded by Suzanne Crouch	Lieutenant Governor of Indiana; 2025–present	Incumbent
