= Julie McGuire =

American politician

Member of the Indiana House of Representatives from the 93rd district
- In office November 22, 2022 – November 4, 2026
- Preceded by: John Jacob
- Succeeded by: Eva Rosberg

Personal details
- Born: Indianapolis, Indiana, U.S.
- Party: Republican
- Spouse: Mark
- Children: 4
- Education: Indiana University Indianapolis (BA)

Julie McGuire is an American politician who formerly served as a member of the Indiana House of Representatives from the 93rd district. She assumed office on November 22, 2022.

== Career ==
McGuire earned a bachelor's degree from Indiana University Indianapolis. She was involved in the Perry Township GOP Club prior to her election. She defeated incumbent John Jacob in the Republican primary prior to winning the general election.

Shortly after Mike Braun won the Republican nomination for the 2024 Indiana gubernatorial election, he announced McGuire as his preferred choice for the lieutenant gubernatorial nomination. However, despite the endorsement of Braun, President Donald Trump, and multiple statewide officials, she narrowly lost the convention vote to pastor Micah Beckwith.

McGuire lost her reelection bid in the 2026 Indiana House of Representatives election to Eva Rosberg.

== Personal life ==
McGuire was born in Indianapolis, Indiana. She and her husband, Mark, have four children. She is Roman Catholic.
