= Robert D. Garton =

American politician (1933–2026)

Bob Garton

President pro tempore of the Indiana Senate
- In office November 5, 1980 – November 8, 2006
- Preceded by: Martin Koons Edwards
- Succeeded by: David C. Long

Member of the Indiana Senate
- In office November 8, 1972 – November 8, 2006
- Preceded by: Constituency established
- Succeeded by: Greg Walker
- Constituency: 41st district
- In office November 4, 1970 – November 8, 1972
- Preceded by: James Boner Young
- Succeeded by: Jesse Charles Andrew Jr.
- Constituency: 22nd district

Personal details
- Born: August 18, 1933 Chariton, Iowa, U.S.
- Died: May 9, 2026 (aged 92)
- Party: Republican
- Spouse: Barbara
- Children: 2
- Education: Iowa State University (BS); Cornell University (MS)
- Religion: Methodist

Military service
- Allegiance: United States
- Branch/service: United States Marine Corps
- Years of service: 1955–1957
- Rank: First lieutenant

Robert Dean Garton (August 18, 1933 – May 9, 2026) was an American politician from the state of Indiana. A Republican, he served in the Indiana Senate from 1970 to 2006. Garton previously served in the United States Marine Corps from 1955 to 1957, reaching the rank of First lieutenant. From 1969 to 1970, Garton served on the Indiana Civil Rights Commission. Garton served as President pro tempore of the Indiana Senate from 1980 to 2006. In 2006, Garton lost renomination to Greg Walker. Garton died on May 9, 2026, at the age of 92.
