= Richard McClain =

American politician

Member of the Indiana House of Representatives from the 24th district
- In office November 9, 1994 – November 7, 2012
- Preceded by: John R. Davis
- Succeeded by: Steve Braun

Personal details
- Born: December 31, 1941 (age 84)
- Party: Republican
- Spouse: Barrie L.
- Education: Purdue University (BS)
- Occupation: Politician

Richard W. McClain (born December 31, 1941) is a former Republican member of the Indiana House of Representatives, representing the 24th District from 1994 to 2012. He was a Logansport City Engineer from 1980 to 1983 and a Jefferson Township Trustee from 1978 to 1982.
