= David C. Long =

American politician

David Long

President pro tempore of the Indiana Senate
- In office November 8, 2006 – November 7, 2018
- Preceded by: Robert Garton
- Succeeded by: Rodric Bray

Member of the Indiana Senate from the 16th district
- In office November 6, 1996 – November 7, 2018
- Preceded by: John Sinks
- Succeeded by: Justin Busch

Member of the Fort Wayne City Council from the 4th district
- In office January 1, 1988 – January 1, 1996
- Preceded by: Ben Eisbart
- Succeeded by: Tom Hayhurst

Personal details
- Born: September 5, 1955 (age 70)
- Party: Republican
- Spouse: Melissa
- Children: 2
- Education: Wabash College; University of California, Davis (BA); Santa Clara University (JD)

David C. Long (born September 5, 1955) is a Republican former member of the Indiana State Senate. He represented the 16th district from 1996 to 2018.

He served as the President Pro Tempore of the Indiana State Senate from 2006 to the end of his tenure.

Prior to his election to the Senate, David Long served from 1988 through 1996 as a member of the Fort Wayne Common Council from the Fourth District. He defeated incumbent Ben Eisbart to win the post. Mr. Eisbart had won the post by defeating incumbent Fredrick Hunter, the father-in-law of David Long. On February 13, 2018, Long announced that he would be retiring from the State Senate on November 6.

Indiana Senate
Preceded by Robert Garton	President pro tempore of the Indiana Senate; 2006–2018	Succeeded by Rodric Bray
