= John Jacob (Indiana politician) =

American politician & activist

Member of the Indiana House of Representatives from the 93rd district
- In office November 17, 2020 – November 22, 2022
- Preceded by: Dollyne Sherman
- Succeeded by: Julie McGuire

Personal details
- Born: Indianapolis, Indiana, U.S.
- Party: Republican
- Spouse: Angie Jacob
- Children: 6
- Education: Indiana University–Purdue University Indianapolis (BS)

John Jacob is an American politician and anti-abortion activist who last served as a member of the Indiana House of Representatives from the 93rd district.

== Early life and education ==
Jacob was born in Indianapolis. He earned a Bachelor of Science degree in accounting and finance from Indiana University–Purdue University Indianapolis.

== Career ==
Prior to entering politics, Jacob worked as an auditor for the Indiana State Board of Accounts. He also owned a small business. Jacob was elected to the Indiana House of Representatives in November 2020. Jacob was endorsed by Operation Save America and campaigned on an anti-abortion platform. During his tenure, he authored House Bill 1282, which would ban abortion in Indiana.

On August 4, 2022, during a debate on new abortion restrictions in the Indiana House of Representatives, Jacob said "The body inside of the mom's body is not her body. Let me repeat that: The body inside of the mom's body is not her body. Not her body, not her choice.“

Jacob was defeated for re-election to the House in the May 2022 Republican primary by Julie McGuire.
