= Martin Koons Edwards =

American politician

Martin "Chip" Koons Edwards

President pro tempore of the Indiana Senate
- In office November 8, 1978 – November 5, 1980
- Preceded by: Robert James Fair
- Succeeded by: Robert D. Garton

Member of the Indiana Senate from the 28th district
- In office November 8, 1972 – January 6, 1981
- Preceded by: Earl Wilson
- Succeeded by: Michael K Rogers

Member of the Indiana Senate from the 15th district
- In office November 6, 1968 – November 8, 1972
- Preceded by: Joy Julian Bailey
- Succeeded by: Thomas Joseph Teague

Personal details
- Born: June 21, 1938
- Died: April 3, 2017 (aged 78)
- Party: Republican
- Spouse(s): Jane Ann Brook; Kaye F. Froio; Elizabeth Miller
- Children: 2
- Education: Wabash College (AB); Indiana University School of Law (LLB)

Martin "Chip" Koons Edwards (June 21, 1938 – April 3, 2017) was an American politician from the state of Indiana. A Republican, he served in the Indiana Senate from 1968 to 1981. Edwards served as President pro tempore of the Indiana Senate from 1978 to 1980. He was a delegate to the Republican National Convention in 1976. He resigned from the State Senate in 1981. In 1982, he went on trial for charges that he accepted a bribe in exchange to push railroad legislation. He died on April 3, 2017.

Indiana Senate
Preceded by Joy Julian Bailey	Member of the Indiana Senate from the 15th district 1968–1972	Succeeded by Thomas Joseph Teague
Preceded by Earl Wilson	Member of the Indiana Senate from the 28th district 1972–1981	Succeeded by Michael K Rogers
Preceded by Robert James Fair	President pro tempore of the Indiana Senate; 1978–1980	Succeeded by Robert D. Garton
