= Phillip E. Gutman =

American politician

Phillip Edward Gutman

President pro tempore of the Indiana Senate
- In office November 4, 1970 – November 3, 1976
- Preceded by: Allan Everett Bloom
- Succeeded by: Robert James Fair

Member of the Indiana Senate from the 16th district
- In office November 8, 1972 – November 3, 1976
- Preceded by: Keith Carter McCormick
- Succeeded by: John Robert Sinks Jr.

Member of the Indiana Senate from the 7th district
- In office November 6, 1968 – November 8, 1972
- Preceded by: Chester Kingsley Watson
- Succeeded by: Thomas Victor McComb

Personal details
- Born: January 5, 1930
- Died: December 22, 2017 (aged 87)
- Party: Republican
- Spouse: Carolyn Prickett Gutman
- Children: 3
- Education: Indiana University (BS, JD)

Phillip Edward Gutman (January 5, 1930 – December 22, 2017) was an American lawyer and politician in Indiana. A Republican, he served in the Indiana Senate from 1968 to 1976. Gutman served as President pro tempore of the Indiana Senate from 1970 to 1976.

He was a Partner in the law firm Rothberg, Gallmeyer, Fruechtenicht, and Logan.

== Personal life ==
He was married to M. Carolyn Prickett and they had three children. He served in the United States Air Force from 1952 to 1954, reaching the rank of First Lieutenant. He was a Methodist. He died on December 22, 2017.
