= Thomas Wyss (politician) =

American politician

Member of the Indiana Senate from the 15th district
- In office July 9, 1985 – November 5, 2014
- Preceded by: Elmer MacDonald
- Succeeded by: Liz Brown

Personal details
- Born: October 24, 1942 (age 83)
- Party: Republican
- Spouse: Shirley(Deceased)
- Children: 2
- Education: Purdue University, Fort Wayne (BS)
- Profession: GE Motors Marketing (Retired)

Military service
- Allegiance: United States
- Branch/service: United States Air Force
- Years of service: 1966–1997
- Rank: Lieutenant colonel
- Unit: Indiana Air National Guard

Thomas John Wyss (born October 24, 1942) is a former Republican member of the Indiana State Senate, representing the 15th district from 1985 until his retirement in 2014. He is Roman Catholic. He previously served on the Allen County Council from 1976 to 1985 and in the Indiana Air National Guard from 1966 to 1997.
