= Indiana Economic Development Corporation =

The Indiana Economic Development Corporation (IEDC) was founded in 2005 and is charged with growing the state economy, driving economic development, helping businesses launch, grow and locate in the state. Led by Secretary of Commerce Bradley B. Chambers and governed by a 14-member board chaired by Governor Mike Braun, the IEDC is organized as a public private partnership and manages many initiatives, including performance-based tax credits, workforce training grants, innovation and entrepreneurship resources, public infrastructure assistance, and talent attraction and retention efforts.

The IEDC 5E economic growth strategy is centered on the following themes: Environment, Entrepreneurship, Economy of the Future, Energy Transition and External Engagement.

In 2022, the IEDC's strategic initiatives delivered:

- A record $22.2 billion in new committed capital investment for the state;
- Expected average wages 22% higher than previous years and 27% higher than the state average;
- An inaugural global economic summit hosting more than 900 guests and 29 international delegations;
- Critical new investments in economy of the future industries, including electric vehicles and microelectronics;
- $500 million READI deployment that is on track to yield over $9 billion economic impact; and
- Recognition as a global top 40 destination for entrepreneurship.

IEDC BOARD OF DIRECTORS & EXECUTIVE LEADERSHIP TEAM:

- Mike Braun – Governor, State of Indiana
- Bradley B. Chambers – Secretary of Commerce, State of Indiana
- David Rosenberg – Chief Operating Officer & Chief of Staff
- Ann Lathrop – Chief Strategy Officer
- Board of Directors – Joel Gorelick, Dominic Grote, Richard L. Johnson Jr., Michael Kubacki, Dr. John C. Lechleiter, Ph.D., Kristin M. Marcuccilli, Sue McCloskey, Fred J. Merritt, Mark D. Miles, Dayton Molendorp, Amy Schumacher, John T. Thompson and Linda E. White.

When Mitch Daniels was elected the 49th Governor of Indiana in 2004, he stated his number one priority was job creation. To achieve that goal, he created the quasi-public Indiana Economic Development Corporation (IEDC), became chairman of its board, and ordered it to “act at the speed of business, not the speed of government” to attract new jobs.
