= Fort Wayne City Council =

Legislative body of the City of Fort Wayne, Indiana

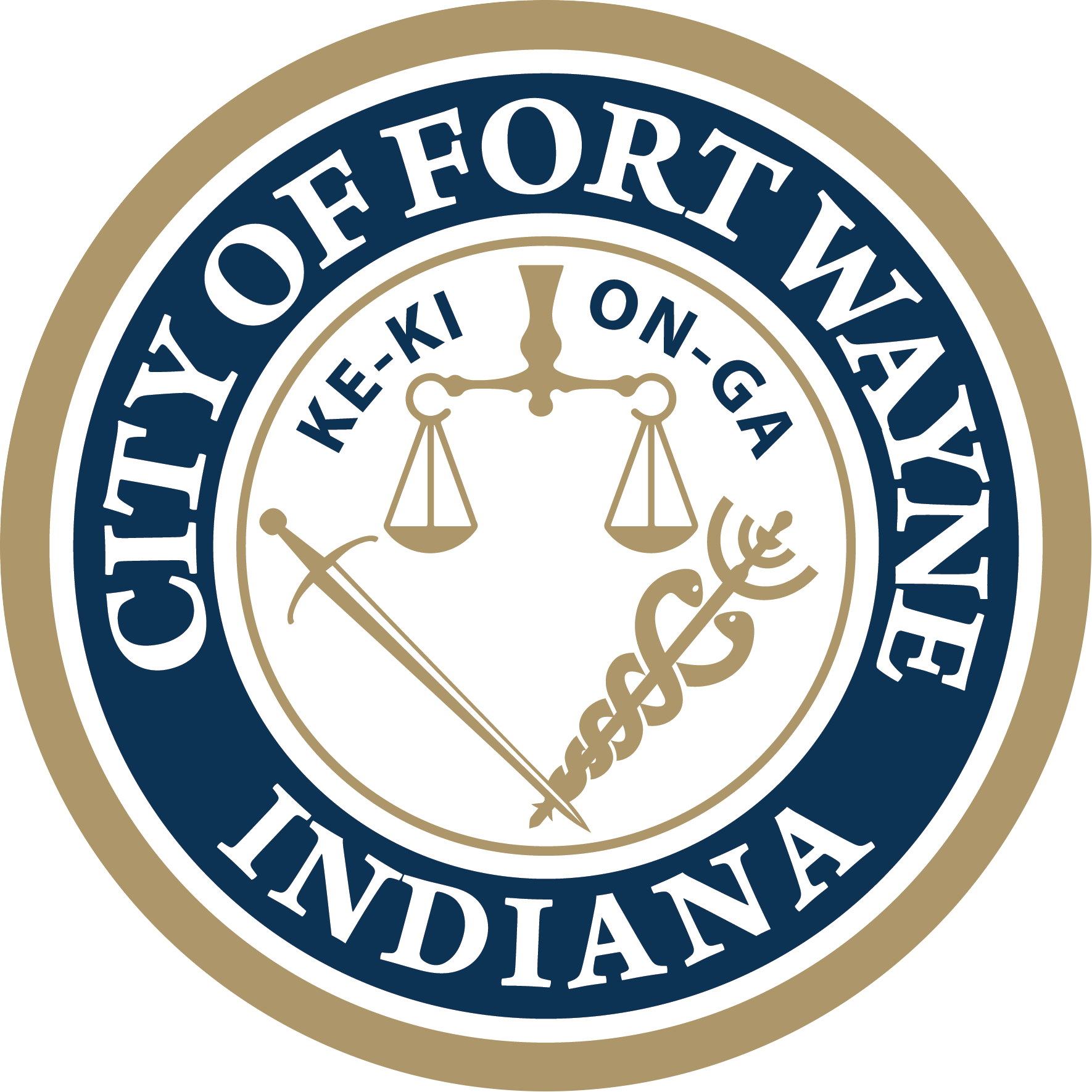

Type
- Type: Unicameral
- Term limits: none

Leadership
- Council President: Marty Bender (R)
- Council Vice President: Paul Ensley (R)

Structure
- Seats: 9
- Political groups: Republican (6); Democratic (3)

Elections
- Last election: November 7, 2023

Website
- https://www.cityoffortwayne.org/city-council.html

The Fort Wayne City Council is the legislative branch of government for the city of Fort Wayne, Indiana. The council uses a strong mayor system with a separately elected mayor who acts as the executive. There are currently nine members of the council. City council members serve a four-year term and there is no term limit. The council consists of nine members, of which 3 are at-large and 6 are representing districts.

== Current composition ==
This is the current composition of the council. The president is Russ Jehl and the vice president is Martin Bender. The partisanship of the council is 6 Republicans to 3 Democrats.

| District | Name | Party | Notes |
|---|---|---|---|
| At-large | Martin Bender | Republican | Vice President |
| At-large | Michelle Chambers | Democratic | |
| At-large | Tom Freistroffer | Republican | |
| 1 | Paul Ensley | Republican | |
| 2 | Russ Jehl | Republican | Council President |
| 3 | Nathan Hartman | Republican | |
| 4 | Scott Myers | Republican | |
| 5 | Geoff Paddock | Democratic | |
| 6 | Rohli Booker | Democratic | |
