= Robert James Fair =

American politician

President pro tempore of the Indiana Senate
- In office November 3, 1976 – November 8, 1978
- Preceded by: Phillip E. Gutman
- Succeeded by: Martin Koons Edwards

Member of the Indiana Senate from the 48th district
- In office November 8, 1972 – November 8, 1978
- Preceded by: Constituency established
- Succeeded by: Kenneth C. Snider

Member of the Indiana Senate from the 25th district
- In office November 9, 1966 – November 8, 1972
- Preceded by: Constituency established
- Succeeded by: Thomas Joseph Teague

Personal details
- Born: October 15, 1919 Detroit, Michigan, U.S.
- Died: January 20, 2002 (aged 82)
- Party: Democratic
- Spouse: Emily Cottrell
- Children: 1
- Education: George Washington University (BA, LLB)

Robert James Fair (October 15, 1919 –January 20, 2002) was an American politician from the state of Indiana. He was born in Detroit, Michigan and later moved to Princeton, Indiana and attended Princeton High School. He attended George Washington University. He served in the United States Army Signal Corps from 1944 to 1946. He served as Gibson County Attorney from 1954 to 1955 and Princeton City Attorney from 1956 to 1959. A Democrat, he served in the Indiana Senate from 1966 to 1978. Fair served as President pro tempore of the Indiana Senate from 1976 to 1978 and is the last Democrat to hold that position. Fair ran for Governor of Indiana in 1976, but lost the primary. He died on January 20, 2002. He was a Methodist.
