= Joe Kernan (politician) =

American politician (1946–2020)

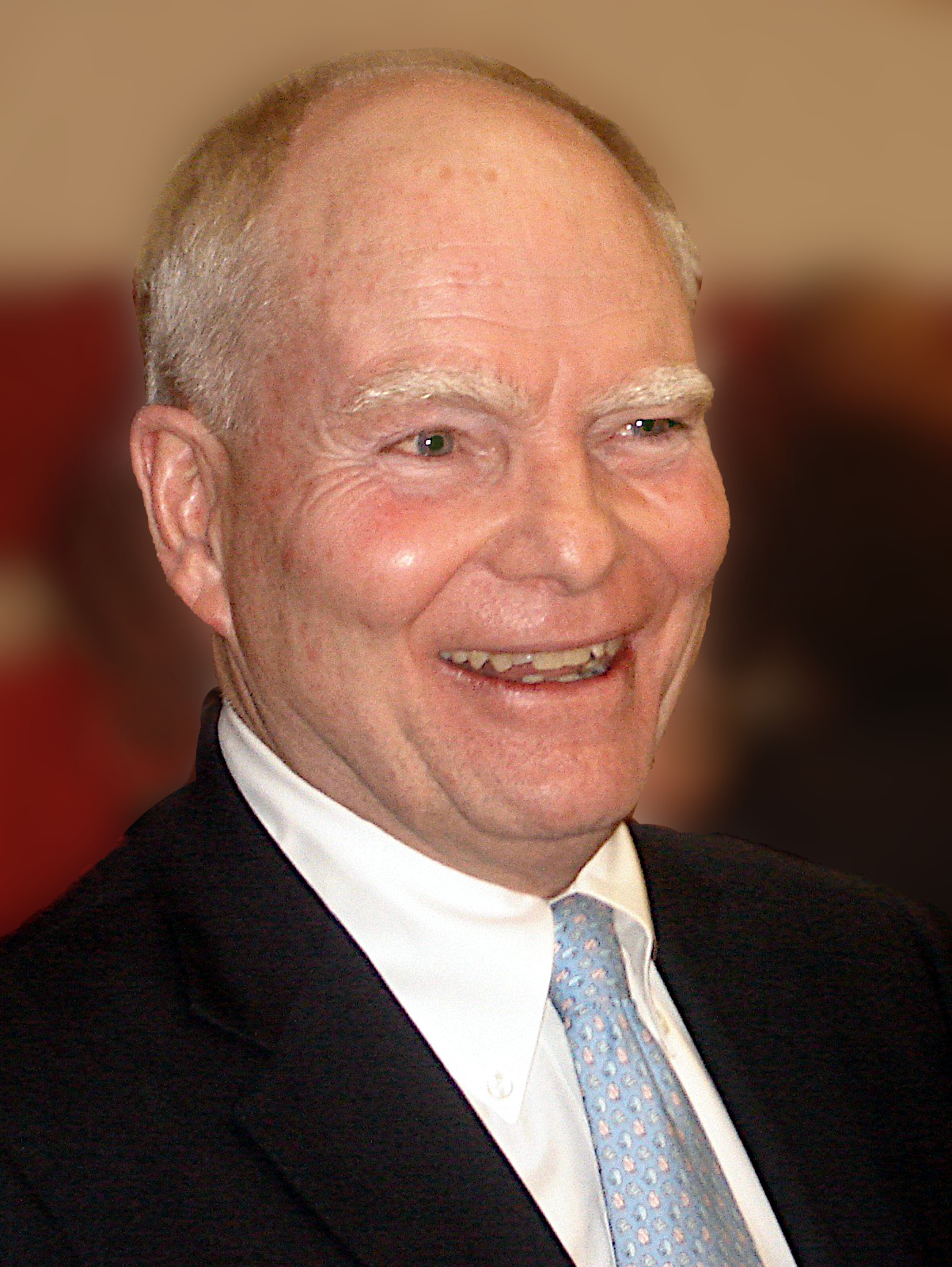
- Kernan in 2008

48th Governor of Indiana
- In office September 13, 2003 – January 10, 2005
- Lieutenant: Kathy Davis
- Preceded by: Frank O'Bannon
- Succeeded by: Mitch Daniels

47th Lieutenant Governor of Indiana
- In office January 13, 1997 – September 13, 2003
- Governor: Frank O'Bannon
- Preceded by: Frank O'Bannon
- Succeeded by: Kathy Davis

30th Mayor of South Bend
- In office January 3, 1988 – January 3, 1997
- Preceded by: Roger Parent
- Succeeded by: Steve Luecke

South Bend Controller
- In office January 1, 1980 – February 17, 1984
- Appointed by: Roger Parent
- Preceded by: Peter Mullen
- Succeeded by: Michael Vance

Personal details
- Born: Joseph Eugene Kernan III; April 8, 1946 Chicago, Illinois, U.S.
- Died: July 29, 2020 (aged 74) South Bend, Indiana, U.S.
- Resting place: Cedar Grove Cemetery, Notre Dame, Indiana, U.S.
- Party: Democratic
- Spouse: Maggie McCullough (m. 1974)
- Education: University of Notre Dame (BA)

Military service
- Allegiance: United States
- Branch/service: United States Navy
- Years of service: 1969–1974 (Active); 1974–1982 (Reserve)
- Rank: Lieutenant
- Battles/wars: Vietnam War
- Awards: Distinguished Flying Cross; Purple Heart (2); Air Medal (2)

Joseph Eugene Kernan III (April 8, 1946 – July 29, 2020) was an American businessman and Democratic politician who served as the 48th governor of Indiana from 2003 to 2005.

After graduating from the University of Notre Dame, Kernan joined the Navy in 1969. A naval aviator, he was shot down in North Vietnam and taken prisoner in 1972. After his release a year later, Kernan continued on active duty through 1974. A member of the Democratic Party, Kernan served as the mayor of South Bend, Indiana, and then as the 47th lieutenant governor of Indiana from 1997 to 2003. He became governor on September 13, 2003, upon the death of Governor Frank O'Bannon. He lost his bid to serve a full term as governor to former Office of Management and Budget director Mitch Daniels on November 2, 2004. Kernan returned to South Bend and retired from politics. As of 2026, he is the most recent governor of Indiana from the Democratic Party.

== Early life and education ==
Joe Eugene Kernan III was born in Chicago, Illinois on April 8, 1946. He was the eldest of nine children.

Kernan's father, Joseph E. Kernan Jr. (1923–2008), was a naval aviator during World War II and would go on to have a career in government service. His mother, Marian Powers Kernan (1922–1998), held a variety of jobs, including a tenure C&P Telephone, where she worked her way up to a communications representative. As a communications representative she handled The Pentagon's account, and held security clearance.

Kernan's father was the unsuccessful Democratic nominee in 1963 for the 4th district seat on the South Bend Common Council, and in 1964 ran unsuccessfully for St. Joseph County commissioner.

Kernan's family moved to South Bend when he was ten years of age. Kernan graduated from St. Joseph High School in South Bend in 1964.

He graduated in 1968 with a degree in government from the University of Notre Dame. Kernan played on the university's baseball team, serving as a walk-on on the freshman team, and playing for the varsity team his sophomore and junior years in 1967 and 1968. He was initially an infielder, later switching to catcher in his junior year.

== Military service ==
Kernan joined the United States Navy in 1969, and served as a Naval Flight Officer aboard the carrier USS Kitty Hawk. After he completed Naval Flight Officer training, reconnaissance training, & RA-5C Vigilante Replacement Air Group training, he served with RVAH-7 at Naval Air Station Albany, Georgia, until deploying to Southeast Asia aboard the aircraft carrier USS Kitty Hawk, where he served (flying 26 missions over Laos and North Vietnam) from February 1972 until a two-seat fighter plane he was serving as a weapons officer on was shot down by enemy forces while on a reconnaissance mission over North Vietnam, during which he and the plane's pilot had been assessing bomb damage. He was detained as a prisoner of war on May 7, 1972. He was held as a prisoner of war for 11 months, being released in 1973.

For part of his time as a prisoner of war, Kernan was imprisoned at Hỏa Lò Prison; however, he spent most of his sentence at a nearby prison dubbed "The Zoo". Kernan was repatriated on March 27, 1973, and continued on active duty with the Navy until December 1974. Kernan received the Distinguished Flying Cross, two Purple Hearts and the Navy Commendation Medal. After leaving active duty, Kernan would continue as an aviator, obtaining a private pilot's license in 1984.

== Early career ==
Kernan served as a business manager and executive at several companies. In 1975, after having completed his Naval service, Kernan worked for Procter & Gamble in Cincinnati, supervising the manufacturing of Camay, Safeguard, and Zest products. He then returned to South Bend, where he worked for South Bend Community Schools and later for the Schwarz Paper Company.

Kernan began his career in government by working for a month in the office of South Bend controller Peter Mullen for a month in 1976 on a special project related to license research.

== South Bend Controller ==
Kernan served South Bend controller from 1980 to 1984. He was appointed to the position by mayor Roger Parent quickly after Parent took office on January 1, 1980. Kernan had been recommended to Parent by Peter Mullen, who held the position before Kernan.

As controller, Kernan served as an ex officio member of the Board of Public Works, and the water and sewage boards. He was also tasked with overseeing the drafting of the city's $40 million annual budget. While in this office, cuts were made in regards to the number of the police and firemen, which he later stated were necessary due to the budget squeeze caused by a state tax freeze and cuts in federal aid. When Kernan left the post, Mayor Parent praised Kernan's work on the budget, claiming that Kernan took the job at the city's worst financial time and that, "just putting a budget together and making it work is an accomplishment, and Joe did a good job". As controller, he negotiated contracts for city employees. This included contracts for the police and fire department workforces, as well as contracts with Teamsters.

Kernan left the office on February 17, 1984, in order to enter the private sector for employment, announcing on his last day in office that he would be working as a vice president for the McWilliams Corporation. He was succeeded in office by Michael Vance. Following his tenure as South Bend Controller, Kernan held his jobs as vice president and treasurer of MacWilliams Corp until he ran for mayor in 1987.

== South Bend mayoralty ==
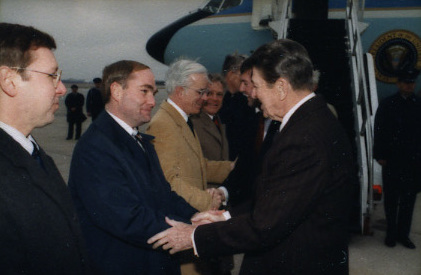
Kernan greeting President Ronald Reagan in 1988

Kernan was elected to serve as mayor of South Bend as the Democratic Party nominee in the 1987 election, and was reelected as the Democratic nominee in the 1991 and 1995 mayoral elections. In 1995, he won 82% of the vote, a record for South Bend mayoral elections. He was the first mayor of the city to win a third term since 1905. Kernan was the longest-serving mayor of South Bend, until his tenure was surpassed in length by that of his immediate successor Steve Luecke.

Kernan was regarded to be a popular mayor. In November 1996, Nancy Armour of The Associated Press wrote that Kernan was, "well-liked by Democrats and Republicans alike. He's friendly and warm, quick to greet residents by name and ask how they are doing. He's accessible too." In 1989, Kernan considered, but ruled out, running against Republican Dan Coats for the United States Senate in the 1990 special election for the seat that had been vacated by Dan Quayle upon becoming vice president. While Kernan was considered a strong prospective candidate among the possible Democratic contenders, commentator James Grass observed prior to Kernan making his decision not to run that, "to run a successful campaign," a Democratic nominee would likely need, "statewide name recognition, a good reputation, and the ability to raise lots of money. All the Democrats still considering a candidacy lack at least one of these qualifications."

As mayor, Kernan worked on long-term job creation efforts, made efforts to improve public safety, and strengthened the finances of the city.

=== Development ===
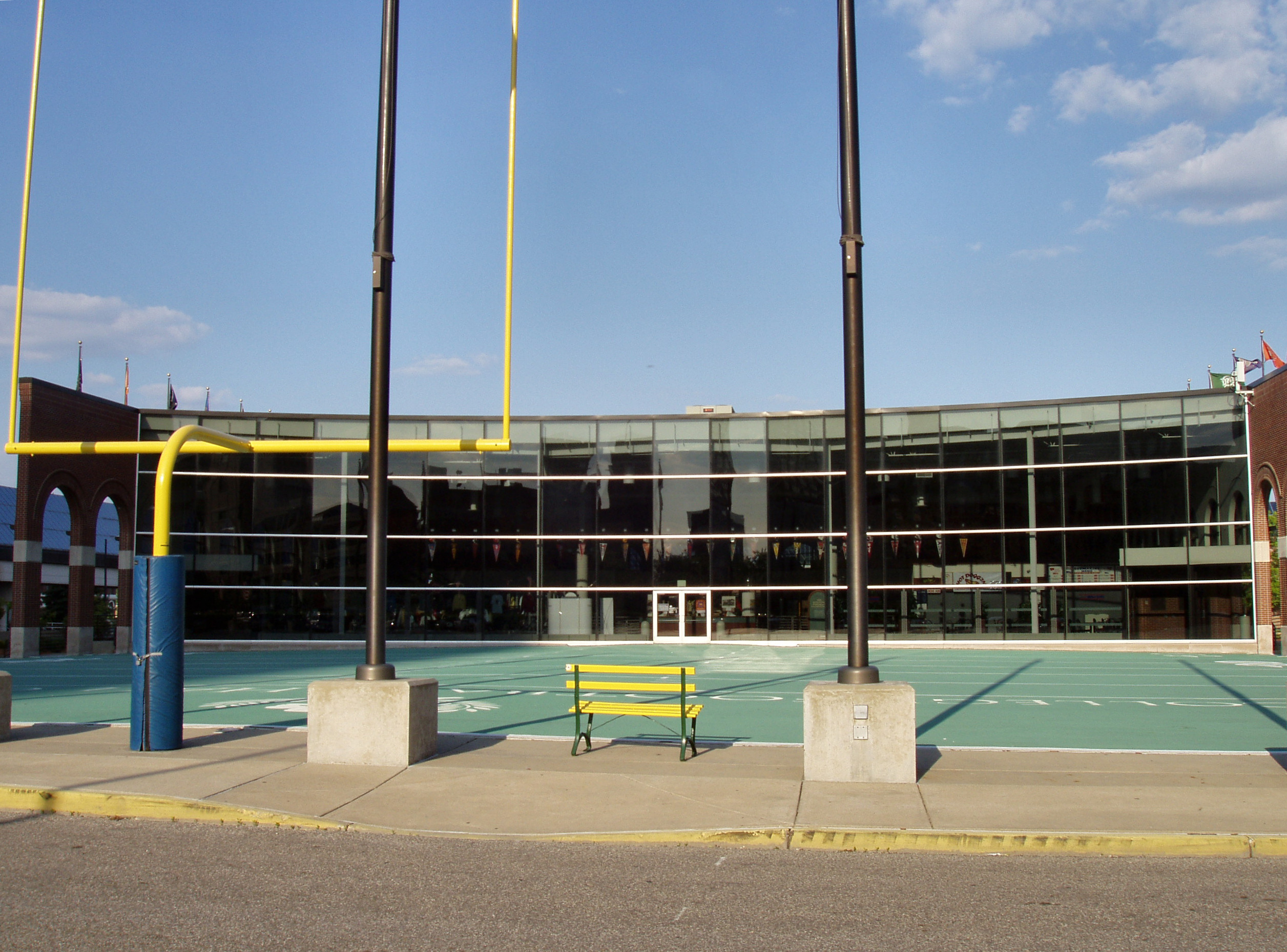
Kernan played a key role in attracting the College Football Hall of Fame to South Bend

At the time he was mayor, Kernan was praised for his ability to attract economic development to the community. Among the major developments he was able to garner South Bend was the securing of the city as the location for the College Football Hall of Fame. Kernan had been instrumental in getting South Bend selected over 89 other cities as the site for the College Football Hall of Fame. Kernan originally pledged that city funds would not go towards the project, and that it would be funded by corporate donations. However, after the city was only able to raise under $2 million in corporate donations, the city issued municipal bonds to pay for the construction.

Among the developments of which Kernan was particularly supportive was the Blackthorn development, a multimillion-dollar golf course and office park development. In 1992, he had touted the concept that became Blackthorn as a "pump for future development." In 1995, Kernan took interest in a proposal to build an arena in South Bend for a new minor league ice hockey team. However, this proposal ultimately failed to materialize.

Some of the developments that were initially regarded as successes for South Bend when Kernan was mayor ultimately fell short in the long run. For instance, the College Football Hall of Fame never met its initial attendance projections. By the late-90s, it already had begun to be criticized as a failure, due to a lack of corporate sponsorship and poor turnout even during special events. The Hall of Fame would ultimately leave South Bend for the city of Atlanta in the 2010s. The Blackthorn, particularly its golf course component, fell short of expectations as well. However, Kernan, as late as 2015, defended the Blackthorn development, having regarded it, personally, to have been a success.

=== Job creation and retention ===
In November 1996, Nancy Armour of The Associated Press wrote that Kernan,

Took a city that had lost thousands of factory jobs and helped diversify its economy, attracting new manufacturing as well as corporate jobs.

Kernan worked on long-term job creation efforts as mayor. Kernan came to office shortly after a number of companies had left the city or closed, such as South Bend Toy in 1985 and Wheelbrater-Frye. Kernan took credit for stopping companies like Allied Products' South Bend Stamping from leaving the city. He also took credit for attracting other jobs to the city, arguing that as mayor he had been able to create or retain 4,000 manufacturing jobs. Another example that illustrates Kernan's work in this area was his successful work in 1993 to keep the Hoosier Lottery's 15-employee regional headquarters in South Bend. After they began looking for a new location, eying sites outside of South Bend, Kernan worked directly with them to find a new location for their offices within the city.

=== Infrastructure ===
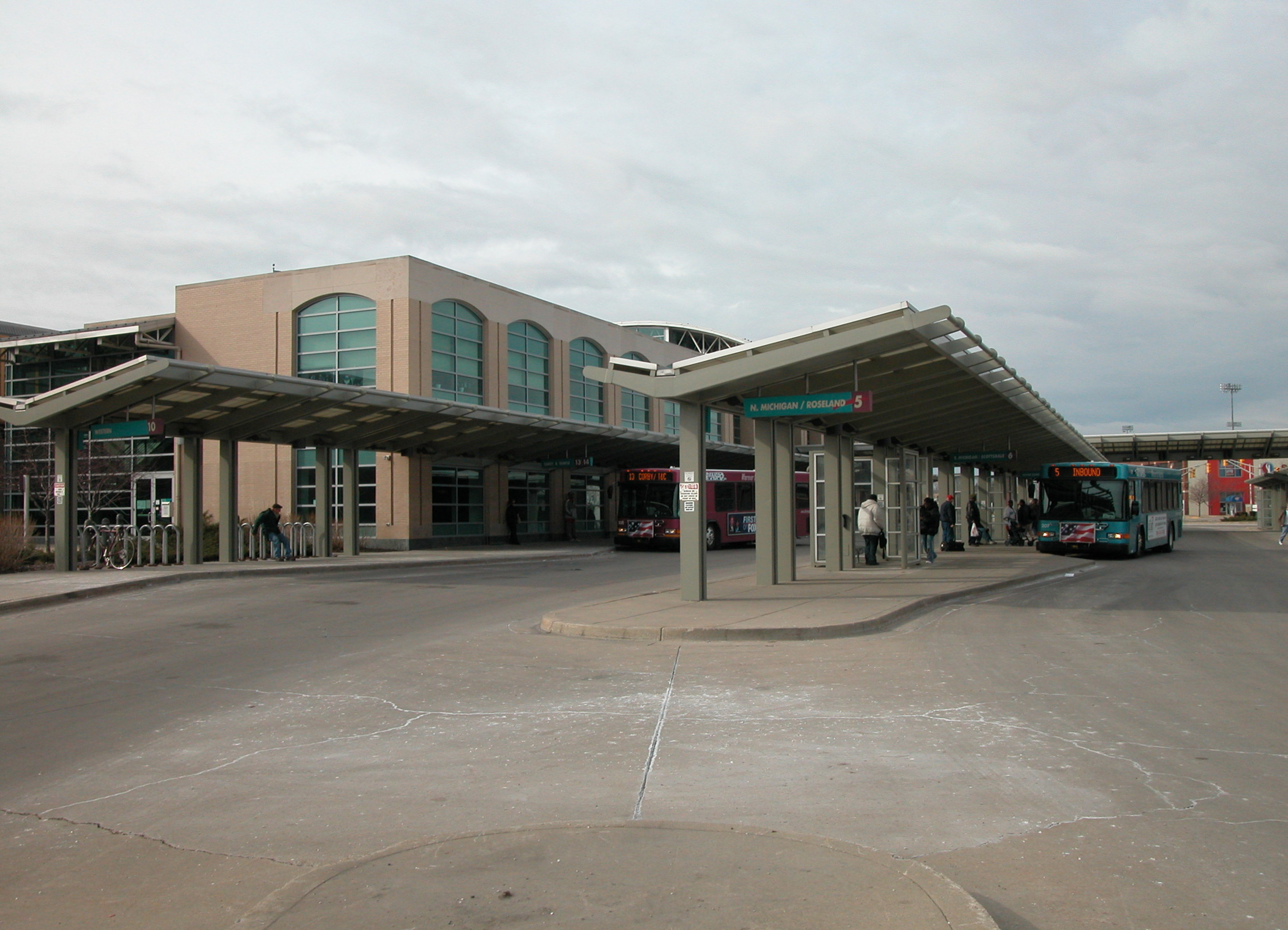
South Street Station, the result of efforts to construct an intermodal transit center which began during Kernan's tenure

Among the infrastructure projects that took place during Kernan's tenure as mayor was the shifting of South Bend's South Shore Line station from a facility shared with Amtrak to a new location at the city's airport, which opened in 1992. In 1993, Kernan testified before congress that this move had been partially responsible for a 73% increase in ridership from South Bend, attributing this to the fact that the previous location of the station was in an area, "isolated and very difficult and perceived to be unsafe" Plans to move the South Shore Line station to the airport, creating an air, bus, and rail intermodal terminal, had dated back to the 1970s.

Kernan and others local officials secured funding for a new intermodal transit center in Downtown South Bend, which was intended to feature both a new station for Amtrak and a new local bus transit hub for South Bend Transpo. Efforts planning this station date back to 1992. It ultimately opened in 1998, after Kernan's mayoralty had ended, as the South Street Station, but only as a bus center without an Amtrak component.

=== Other matters ===
As mayor, Kernan worked to create a better working relationship between the South Bend city government and the nearby University of Notre Dame.

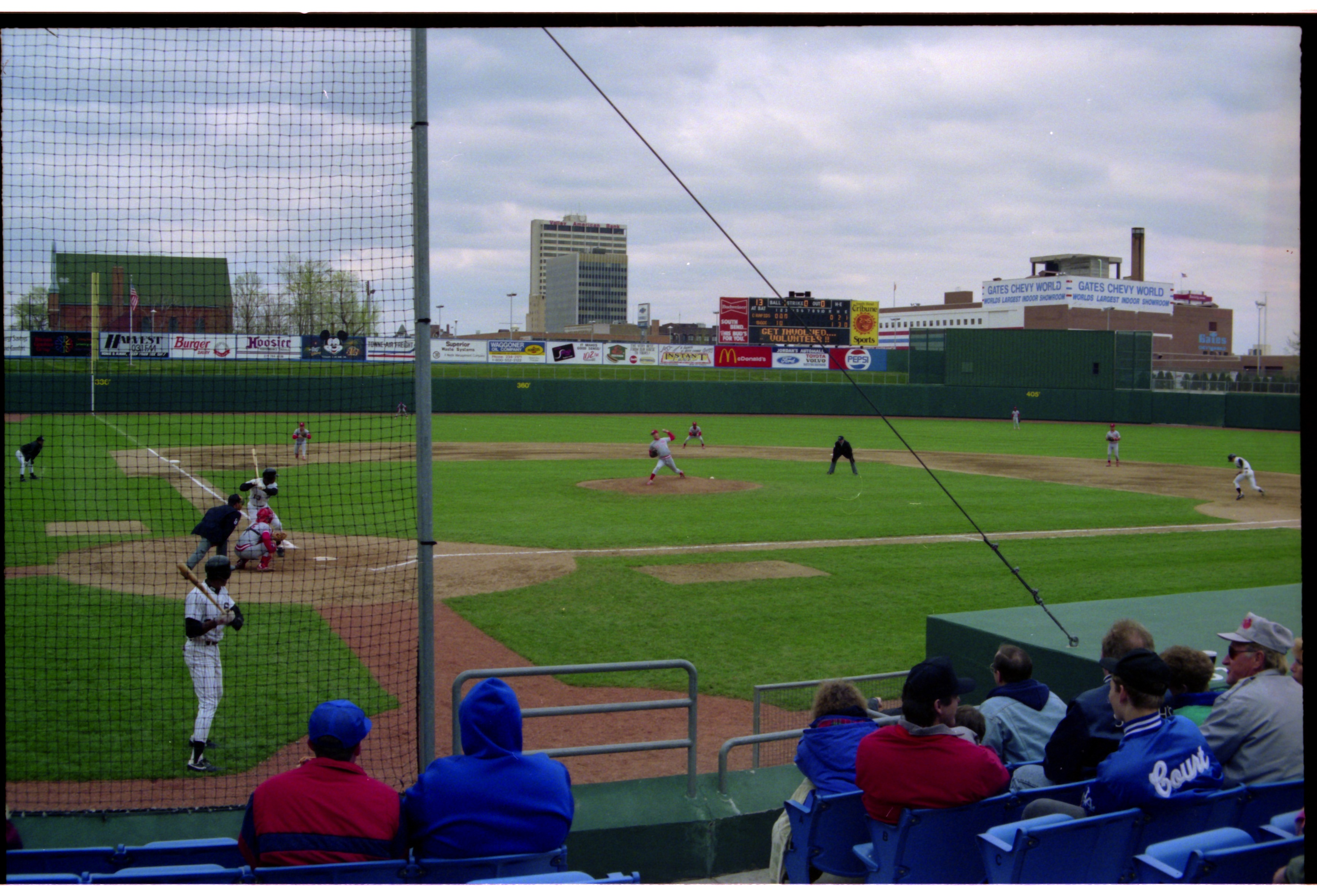
Kernan refinanced Coveleski Stadium

In 1988, taking advantage of a decline in interest rates, Kernan refinanced Coveleski Stadium through the newly created South Bend Redevelopment Authority.

== 1996 election as lieutenant governor ==
In 1996, Kernan was elected as Indiana's lieutenant governor on the Democratic Party ticket with then-lieutenant governor Frank O'Bannon topping the ticket as the gubernatorial nominee. Kernan had been reluctant to accept O'Bannon's offer to run with him, initially desiring to instead continue to serve as mayor. Others who had been rumored to have under consideration by O'Bannon for a running mate included Tom DiGuillio, Mike Gery, Baron Hill, John Walda, and Jill Long Thompson. Pamela Carter had ruled herself out of consideration. There has been some reporting that O'Bannon may have first offered the running mate position to Long Thompson and that she had rejected.

Kernan, the mayor of a Northern Indiana city, brought geographic balance to the ticket headed by O'Bannon, a native of the Southern Indiana city of Corydon. O'Bannon had previously signaled that he was exploring choosing a running mate from Northern Indiana in order to provide that geographic benefit. Kernan and O'Bannon had a strong preexisting acquaintanceship. O'Bannon had developed a working relationship on issues of economic development since O'Bannon oversaw the Indiana Department of Commerce as lieutenant governor. Kernan had developed a particularly strong camaraderie with O'Bannon six years earlier in 1990, when Kernan and other Indiana mayors accompanied O'Bannon on a trade mission to Poland, Soviet Union, Ukraine, and Yugoslavia. O'Bannon's selection of Kernan was announced June 3, 1996 with a press release followed by press conference in South Bend and Indianapolis. in its press release, the gubernatorial campaign promoted Kernan as having had a record of success in attracting businesses to the city of South Bend.

On the campaign trail, Kernan "barnstormed" across the state. Kernan had grown tired of long road trips, and at his wife's suggestion took refresher he began traveling by piloting a private aircraft. In June, he took a refresher piloting course (having been inactive as a pilot for the previous several years due to his busy mayoral schedule) and completed his biennial pilot's flight review and medical exam in order to fly himself to subsequent campaign events. He rented a single-engine Cessna 172 aircraft, and used campaign funds to cover his travel expenses. He credited this as enabling him to travel quicker to events, return to South Bend more frequently. Kernan also found flying, a focused activity that concentrated his mind away from campaign concerns, to be a means of relieving campaign-related stress. He never flew O'Bannon on his aircraft, telling reporters that he did not think it would be wise to have both candidates on the gubernatorial election ticket fly on the same plane. He did, however, at one point fly Democratic attorney general nominee Jeff Modisett on his plane.

While campaigning for lieutenant governor in 1996, Kernan continued to fulfill his duties as mayor. In part to facilitate this, Kernan operated his end of the campaign out of a separate campaign office from O'Bannon, located in South Bend. Despite starting the general election as underdogs, O'Bannon and Kernan's ticket to defeat overcame their underdog position to defeat the Republican ticket of Stephen Goldsmith and George Witwer.

Upon being elected lieutenant governor, Kernan involved himself in guiding the selection of his mayoral successor. He involved St. Joseph Democratic Party chairman Butch Morgan and South Bend City Council president Roland Kelly in the interviewing of prospective successors. By law, his successor was appointed by the city's 120 Democratic Party precinct committeemen and committeewoman, and it was required that a successor be appointed within thirty days of Kernan leaving office as mayor. It was anticipated that Kernan's endorsement would be heeded by them. Kernan ultimately endorsed Steve Luecke to be his successor, and Luecke was thereafter voted unanimously to serve the rest of Kernan's term.

== Lieutenant Governor of Indiana ==
From January 1997, until assuming the governorship in September 2003, Kernan served as lieutenant governor of Indiana. As lieutenant governor, Kernan built a reputation as a skilled orator. Kernan was regarded to be a popular lieutenant governor.

=== First term ===
Kernan was sworn in as lieutenant governor in January 1997, with the oath of office being administered to him by his own father. As lieutenant governor, Kernan was also the president of the Indiana Senate, the director of the state's Department of Commerce, and the state's commissioner of agriculture. His time serving in the capacity of head of the state's Department of Commerce coincided with a period in which the state recorded what at the time were the second-highest export numbers in its history during the second quarter of 1998.

In 1998, Kernan headed the Insurance Industry Working Group, a group aiming to boost the economic fortunes of the state's insurance industry. The group succeeded in getting a reduction to the insurance premium tax rate, securing the passage of a new demutualization law, and getting Ivy Tech to create a new associate degree focusing on the insurance industry. That same year, Kernan was also involved in the formation of the Pork Crisis Working Group, which later became Agricultural Crisis Working Group. Kernan chaired this group. He also was made chair of the new Hoosier Farmland Preservation Task Force. It presented recommendations for farmland preservation and additional land use issues to O'Bannon and members of the Indiana General Assembly, and Laos provided information and advice to communities dealing with problems regarding these issues. In 1999, Kernan launched the Veterans Outreach Initiative, which was an effort to urge veterans to capitalize upon state and federal benefits available to them. He was also made the chairman of the Indiana 21st Century Research and Technology Fund when it was formed in 1999.

=== Second term ===
O'Bannon and Kernan were re-elected in 2000, defeating the ticket of David M. McIntosh and J. Murray Clark.

In October 2001, Kernan unveiled the O'Bannon administration's plan for a comprehensive overhaul to the state of Indiana's tax system. The plan was entitled the 21st Century Tax Plan. Kernan had developed this plan alongside a bipartisan group of tax experts. A tax reform plan based upon this proposal was passed in the Indiana General Assembly in June 2002. In July 2002, he announced a reorganization of the Indiana Department of Commerce in which the department shifted from being divided into thirteen divisions to instead dividing into two teams (program operations and professional services). The reorganization also included the creation of twelve regional offices, including a central office in Indianapolis (the state capital). In December 2002, O'Bannon and Kernan proposed a broad job-creation plan entitled "Energize Indiana".

In 2002, a rift arose between Kernan and Governor O'Bannon over O'Bannon's selection of Peter Manous as chairman of the Democratic Party of Indiana.

==== Acting governor ====
On September 10, 2003, Kernan began serving as acting governor. O'Bannon had been hospitalized after suffering a stroke two days earlier. This was the first time that Indiana had ever implemented their state constitution's clause for handing over the authority of governor in the instance that the governor is unable to perform their duty due to disability. Per the cause, the speaker of the Indiana House of Representatives, B. Patrick Bauer, and the president pro tempore of the Indiana Senate, Robert D. Garton, made a request on September 10, 2003, to Indiana Supreme Court Chief justice Randall Shepard asking for the court to issue a ruling on O'Bannon's ability to perform his duties. Prior to making the request, the speaker and president pro tempore both had consulted with O'Bannon's counsel, his medical treatment team, and his family. After just over an hour of private discussion, the court ruled that same day that O'Bannon was currently unable to perform his gubernatorial duties and that Kernan would become acting governor.

== Governor of Indiana ==
Governor O'Bannon died September 13, 2003. After O'Bannon's death, Kernan assumed the governorship. He had already assumed the powers of acting governors several days prior, after the Supreme Court found O'Bannon to be unable to fulfill the duties of his office. Kernan would receive praise for what was regarded to have been a smooth transition into the office after O'Bannon's sudden stroke and death.

=== Appointments and personnel ===
After assuming the governorship, Kernan appointed Kathy Davis to serve as his lieutenant governor. She was the first female lieutenant governor in Indiana's history.

Early into his governorship, Kernan made some key hires and appointments. This included hiring Marshall Michael Carrington to conduct a thorough probe of the Indiana Bureau of Motor Vehicles, and appointing Cheryl Sullivan to head the Family and Social Services Administration. Kernan was credited with strengthening the cabinet style of government of Indiana's executive branch, which had dissipated in its functionality in the later years of O'Bannon's tenure.

=== Economic matters ===
Kernan assumed office amid an economic downturn in the state, with state revenue decreasing and unemployment rising. During his governorship, the state struggled with budget deficits and job losses, which Republicans faulted Kernan for, but which Democrats blamed on the lingering aftermath of the early 2000s recession and the dot-com bust. In 2004, the Indiana Fiscal Policy Institute (IFPI) found that the state was facing an $824.3 million structural deficit, a deficit equivalent to more than 7% of the state's existing revenues, with the deficit anticipated to significantly grow every year under the existing budget priorities. On a positive note, in 2004, the state began to experience notable increases in revenue in mid-2004.

In November 2003, Kernan and Davis unveiled the Opportunity Indiana initiative, which would aim to optimize how the state conducts business and would aim to increase opportunities for Indiana companies. Under this program, they created a working group to review how the state of Indiana deals with purchasing goods and services, and to provide recommendations to adjustments.

In his 2004 State of the State address, Kernan outlined the Indiana@Work program, an expansion of the state's new jobs initiative. By the end of 2004, 30,000 Hoosiers would receive skills assessments through this program.

=== Education ===
In January 2004, Kernan announced the Early Learning Trust, which was an initiative with the goal of providing every child in Indiana with access to voluntary full-day kindergarten by the year 2007. It would also create pilot programs for early learning opportunities for at-risk children.

In March 2004, Kernan requested to the state's public colleges and universities that they cap tuition and fee increases at 4% for the 2004–05 academic year. In October 2004 he unveiled plans to expand the state's community college system from having ten campuses to having 23 in time for the fall of 2005, which would mean that every state resident would live within a 30-mile radius of a community college's campus.

Through executive order, Kernan created the Early Learning and School Readiness Commission.

As co-chair of the Indiana Education Roundtable, Kernan took charge in work to adopt the P-16 Plan for Improving Student Achievement.

=== Healthcare ===
Kernan took actions as governor to address rising healthcare costs. Changes were made to HoosierRx to allow senior citizens twice the discount when it was utilized in conjunction with the new federal Medicare prescription drug benefit. Kernan signed legislation which created the state's prescription drug purchasing pool. Kernan pushed forward with the Hoosier Health Plan. On December 1, 2004, Kernan convened a prescription drug summit aiming to develop an "Indiana solution" to drug affordability concerns.

=== Highway infrastructure ===
Kernan supported a controversial project extending Interstate 69 from Indianapolis to Evansville, which had earlier received O'Bannon's support. Kernan also pursued upgrades to U.S. Route 31. The Indiana Department of Transportation estimated that Kernan's proposed projects for U.S. Route 31 would cost more than $1 billion.

=== Other matters ===
In his 2004 State of the State address, Kernan announced the Peak Performance Project, in which he delegated lieutenant governor Davis with overseeing a review of state government performance. The Peak Performance Project would ultimately result in the creation of a broad plan for overhauling the state's government.

On March 17, 2004, Kernan signed House Bill 1349, which provided protections for gun owners whose firearms were stolen from being sued for injuries or deaths resulting from misuse of those stolen firearms.

In 2004, Kernan became the first governor of Indiana in 48 years to spare the life of an inmate on death row, when, just days before his scheduled execution, Kernan commuted the sentence of Darnell Williams to life in prison without parole.

=== 2004 re-election campaign ===
2004 Indiana gubernatorial election results by county: Daniels: 50–60% 60–70% 70–80% Tie: 40–50% Kernan: 40–50% 50–60% 60–70%

In December 2002, whilst lieutenant governor, despite previous widespread anticipation that he would seek the governorship, Kernan made the surprise announcement that he would not run in the 2004 election. However, two months after assuming the governorship, he reversed this decision, declaring himself a candidate. Kernan was unopposed in the Democratic primary and in the general election faced Republican Mitch Daniels.

In their bid for a first full term as governor and lieutenant governor, Kernan and Davis outlined their vision for what he would seek to accomplish in their prospective continued tenure in the state's top two offices in a plan entitled "Action Indiana".

One of the things Kernan criticized his opponent, Daniels, for was Daniels' decision in 2000, as a member of the board of the Indianapolis Power & Light Company, to vote to sell the utility company to an out-of-state company. Kernan characterized it as "terribly bad judgement".

Kernan pledged to pursue upgrades to U.S. Route 31 calling it, "one of my top priorities since I first took office as lieutenant governor in 1997, and...still among them today." He declared that there had progress in the pursuit of improvements, and that the plans had been made in a "fiscally responsible manner" Kernan also voiced opposition to the prospect making the thoroughfare a toll road, declaring, "I will not make Hoosiers – or the people who are driving through on business or pleasure – pay a toll to travel this roadway." Daniels criticized Kernan's proposals, characterizing them as fiscally irresponsible, claiming, "The gap between the cost and the available funds in the Indiana Department of Transportation's budget is more than $3 billion in the next six years. For a state that is broke by every measure, the governor's promise list is impossible."

Kernan and Davis were ultimately defeated by the Republican ticket of Mitch Daniels and Becky Skillman. 53% to 45% At the time, the election was the most expensive gubernatorial election in the state's history, in regards to campaign spending. The Republicans have controlled Indiana's governor's mansion since Kernan's departure.

== Post-gubernatorial career ==
Kernan returned to private life in January 2005, and moved back to South Bend in 2006. He became the president and owner of the community and business development consulting firm South Bend Enterprises, Inc. He served as a volunteer acting director for the St. Joseph County Red Cross. He worked at the University of Notre Dame as an adjunct professor. He served on the Indiana University South Bend Chancellor's advisory board, and was a member of the Chancellor's 100 of Indiana University. He also partnered with his gubernatorial successor by working with Daniels's nonprofit, the Mitch Daniels Leadership Foundation.

=== South Bend Silver Hawks ===
In 2005, Kernan became president and managing investor of the South Bend Silver Hawks baseball club, after convincing approximately 50 others to invest in the team. This kept the team in South Bend, amid rumors that they were eying a move out of the city.

Kernan's tenure with the South Bend Silver Hawks team ended in 2011. Kernan then agreed to sell the team to Andrew Berlin, of Berlin Packaging, so that he could develop the Silver Hawks further and keep the team in the South Bend area. The team has subsequently been the renamed the South Bend Cubs.

=== Later political involvement ===
==== Co-chair of the Indiana Commission on Local Government Reform ====
In July 2007, Kernan and Indiana Chief Justice Randall T. Shepard, a Republican, were appointed by Daniels to co-chair the bipartisan Indiana Commission on Local Government Reform. The commission published its report in December 2007. It recommended making broad changes to the structure of local government in the state. The report recommended having county argument mimic state government by having a single executive act that acts the chief executive officer and a legislative body which deals with fiscal and policy matters. The report also recommended saving costs bay eliminating township governments and having other levels of government assume services currently provided by townships. It also recommended having a unified county library system within each of the state's 92 counties. It also recommended decreasing the expenses of elections by moving municipal elections from off-years to even-numbered years. The state acted on a recommendation to eliminate township assessors, merging their responsibilities with county assessors. A state law was passed allowing townships to vote on whether to retain or abolish their assessors. In October 2008, Kernan and Shepherd co-authored an op-ed urging voters to vote to abolish assessor positions in their townships in the November elections. That November, 30 townships abolished their assessors, while thirteen retained theirs.

==== National politics ====
In 2008, Kernan and his wife Maggie were Indiana co-chairs of Hillary Clinton's presidential campaign and actively campaigned for Clinton leading up to the state's May primary. Ahead of the state's April primaries, Kernan also endorsed Jim Schellinger's gubernatorial campaign. Like Kernan, Schellinger originally hailed from South Bend. In his endorsement, Kernan stated that he had personally known Schellinger for years prior and considered him a friend and a great prospective governor. Breaking with her husband, Maggie Kernan endorsed Schellinger's primary election opponent, Jill Long Thompson. During the 2016 United States presidential election, Kernan appeared in a Priorities USA Action-funded television advertisement criticizing Republican nominee Donald Trump as "unfit to be president." In the ad, he also referred to comments Trump had made deriding John McCain's military service, in which, like Kernan, he was a prisoner of war in the Vietnam war, as, "disgraceful". The ad was run in nine swing states.

In 2017, along with Republican former Ohio Governor Bob Taft, Kernan co-authored an op-ed arguing in favor of abolishing the death penalty for mentally ill criminals.

==== South Bend politics ====
Kernan endorsed Pete Buttigieg during the 2011 South Bend mayoral election. In 2015, Kernan served as campaign manager and treasurer for Kareemah Fowler's campaign for South Bend City Clerk. Fowler had a landslide victory in capturing Democratic nomination in a competitive primary, defeating veteran Common Council member Derek Dieter, and was elected clerk in the general election. Kernan endorsed Tim Corbett in his unsuccessful bid for the Democratic nomination in the 2018 St. Joseph County Sheriff election.

In 2014, Kernan and several other city leaders, including his mayoral successor Steve Luecke, former South Bend fire chief Luther Taylor, and the CEO of the South Bend Regional Chamber of Commerce Jeff Rea (a Republican) all held a joint press conference in which complained about visible infighting within the South Bend Common Council. Kernan also criticized lewd social media posts by then-5th district council member Henry Davis Jr. as an embarrassment to the city. At the press conference, Kernan levied the possibility that he would work to help remove problematic members of the council from office in the 2015 election. Immediately after, in comments to the South Bend Tribune, Kernan criticized Common Council Vice President Derek Dieter as being "poison in the well", alleging that he had been "behaving like a bully". Kernan criticized the leadership of Common Council President Oliver Davis, arguing that he believed Davis was a, "good guy," who was, "reluctant to make decisions". Kernan's harsh rebuke of the council earned support from council member Fred Ferlic.

== Honors and awards ==
For his military service, Kernan was awarded the Distinguished Flying Cross, two Purple Hearts and the Navy Commendation Medal. He was among the second-ever class of inductees into the Indiana Military Veterans Hall of Fame when he was enshrined in 2015.

Kernan was awarded an honorary doctorate by his alma mater the University of Notre Dame in 1998, when he served as the university's commencement speaker. In 2012, the Notre Dame Monogram Club awarded Kernan the Edward "Moose" Krause Distinguished Service Award. Six years later, the University of Notre Dame Alumni Association presented Kernan with the Rev. Edward Frederick Sorin, C.S.C., Award, regarded to be one of the university's highest honors.

A park in South Bend was named for Kernan in 2017. The park, located along the St. Joseph River, had previously been named Viewing Park. That same year, Kernan received an honorary doctorate of Humane Letters from Indiana University.

== Personal life ==
Kernan was the eldest of nine children. He had one brother and seven sisters. He was Catholic.

Kernan married Maggie McCullough in April 1974. In 1976, they moved to the north side of South Bend, Indiana. Maggie is a Purdue University graduate; she was an executive with 1st Source Bank and was active in community service. The couple did not have any children.

=== Death ===
On July 8, 2020, Kernan's family announced that he had been diagnosed with Alzheimer's disease several years earlier, and was living in a care facility in South Bend. The disease had progressed to the point that he had lost the ability to speak. He died from complications of the disease later that month, on July 29, at the age of 74.

== Political positions ==
Kernan stated that he was "personally opposed" to abortion, but was strongly pro-choice.

While lieutenant governor, Kernan commented on President Bill Clinton's misconduct outlined in the Starr Report, stating that the president had "gone too far," and further commenting on a sense of disappointment in Clinton by saying, "We've all had some feelings over the last few weeks and the past seven months. Some of us are angry, disappointed, ashamed, bitter, sad. For all of us, one or more of these emotions have come together."

As governor, Kernan was not opposed to providing special subsidies for large employers to move jobs to the state. He responded to criticisms of this feeding into a race to the bottom by declaring, "I understand the argument that taking jobs away from Boston and putting them here is nationally a zero-sum game. But Indiana, like virtually every other state, is not going to unilaterally disarm".

In 2017, along with Republican former Ohio Governor Bob Taft, Kernan co-authored an op-ed arguing in favor of abolishing the death penalty for mentally ill criminals.

== Electoral history ==
=== Mayor ===
1987 South Bend mayoral election
Party	Candidate	Votes	%
Democratic	Joe Kernan	17,030	53.00%
Republican	Carl Baxmeyer	15,104	47.00%
Total votes		32,134	100

1991 South Bend mayoral election
Party	Candidate	Votes	%
Democratic	Joe Kernan (incumbent)	16,134	76.49%
Republican	Sylvia Shelton	4,958	23.51%
Total votes		21,092	100

1995 South Bend mayoral election
Party	Candidate	Votes	%
Democratic	Joe Kernan (incumbent)	14,309	82.17%
Republican	Mike Waite	3,106	17.84%
Total votes		17,415	100

=== Lieutenant gubernatorial ===
1996 Indiana gubernatorial election
Party	Candidate	Votes	%
Democratic	Frank O'Bannon/Joe Kernan	1,087,128	51.52
Republican	Stephen Goldsmith/George Witwer	986,982	46.78
Libertarian	Steve Dillon/Leona McPherson	35,805	1.70

2000 Indiana gubernatorial election
Party	Candidate	Votes	%
Democratic	Frank O'Bannon (incumbent)/Joe Kernan (incumbent)	1,232,525	56.56
Republican	David M. McIntosh/J. Murray Clark	908,285	41.68
Libertarian	Andrew Horning/Mark Schreiber	38,458	1.76

=== Governor ===
2004 Indiana gubernatorial election
Party	Candidate	Votes	%
Republican	Mitch Daniels/Becky Skillman	1,302,912	53.21%
Democratic	Joe Kernan (incumbent)/Kathy Davis (incumbent)	1,113,900	45.49%
Libertarian	Kenn Gividen/Elaine Badnarik	31,664	1.29%
Write-ins		22	0.00%
Majority		189,012	7.72%
Turnout		2,448,498	57%

== See also ==
- List of governors of Indiana
- U.S. prisoners of war during the Vietnam War

Political offices
Preceded by Frank O'Bannon	Lieutenant Governor of Indiana; 1997–2003	Succeeded by Kathy Davis
Preceded by Frank O'Bannon	Governor of Indiana; 2003–2005	Succeeded by Mitch Daniels
Party political offices
Preceded by Frank O'Bannon	Democratic nominee for Lieutenant Governor of Indiana; 1996, 2000	Succeeded by Kathy Davis
Preceded by Frank O'Bannon	Democratic nominee for Governor of Indiana; 2004	Succeeded by Jill Long Thompson
