= Frank O'Bannon =

American politician (1930–2003)

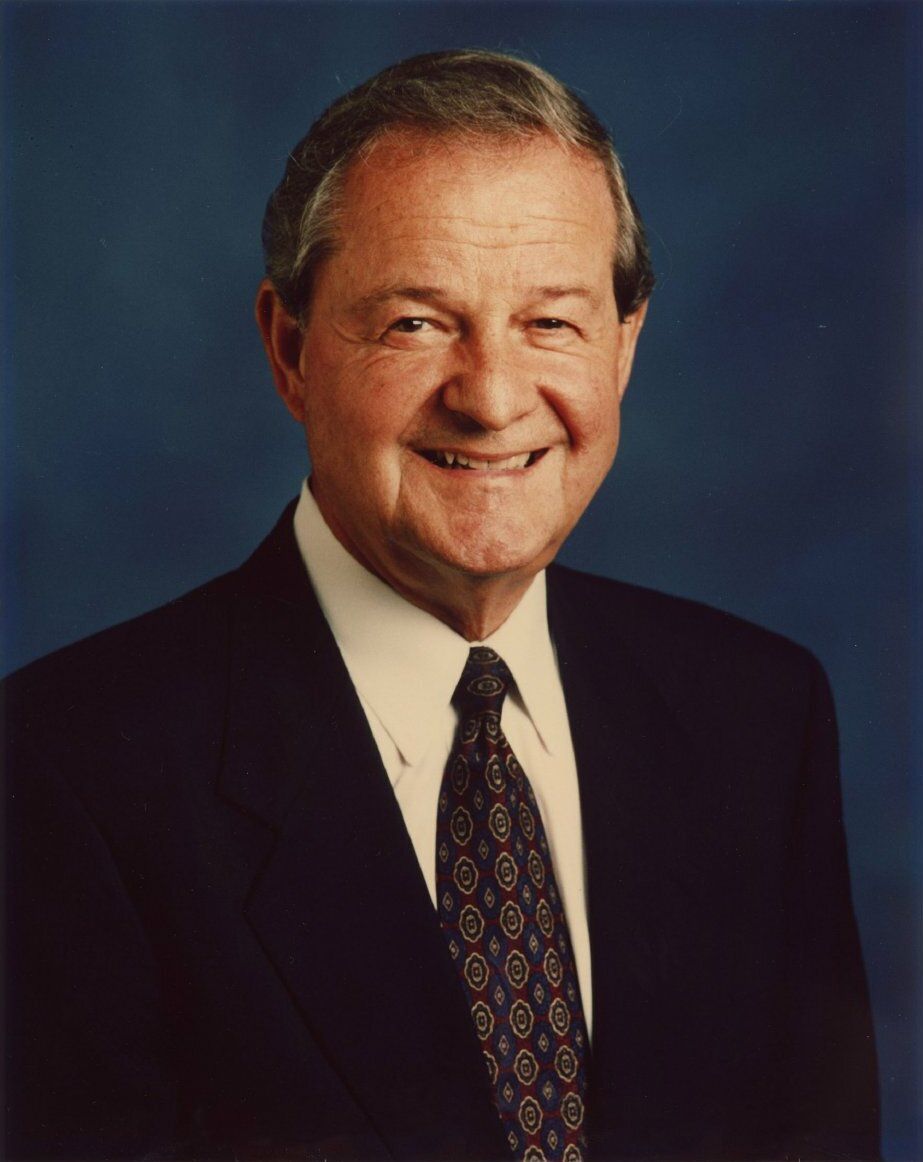
- Official portrait, c. 1990

47th Governor of Indiana
- In office January 13, 1997 – September 13, 2003
- Lieutenant: Joe Kernan
- Preceded by: Evan Bayh
- Succeeded by: Joe Kernan

46th Lieutenant Governor of Indiana
- In office January 9, 1989 – January 13, 1997
- Governor: Evan Bayh
- Preceded by: John Mutz
- Succeeded by: Joe Kernan

33rd Chair of the National Lieutenant Governors Association
- In office 1992–1993
- Preceded by: Scott McCallum
- Succeeded by: Joanell Dyrstad

Member of the Indiana Senate
- In office November 4, 1970 – December 1, 1988
- Preceded by: Robert Presley O'Bannon
- Succeeded by: Richard D. Young
- Constituency: 29th district (1970–1972); 46th district (1972–1982); 47th district (1982–1988)
- Succeeded by: Leslie Duvall

Personal details
- Born: Frank Lewis O'Bannon; January 30, 1930 Louisville, Kentucky, U.S.
- Died: September 13, 2003 (aged 73) Chicago, Illinois, U.S.
- Party: Democratic
- Spouse: Judith Asmus (m. 1957)
- Children: 3
- Education: Indiana University Bloomington (BA, JD)

Military service
- Allegiance: United States
- Branch/service: United States Air Force
- Years of service: 1952–1954
- Rank: First Lieutenant

Frank Lewis O'Bannon (January 30, 1930 – September 13, 2003) was an American politician who served as the 47th governor of Indiana, from 1997 until his death in 2003.

O'Bannon was a native of Corydon, Indiana. He graduated from Corydon High School (now Corydon Central High School) in 1948 and then Indiana University Bloomington, where he met his wife Judy. In Corydon, he served as a practicing attorney and a newspaper publisher for The Corydon Democrat before his entrance into the political arena.

A conservative Democrat, O'Bannon was first elected to the Indiana Senate in 1969. He eventually became one of the body's most prominent members. O'Bannon ran for Governor of Indiana in 1988; however, instead of facing a hotly competitive primary, O'Bannon dropped out of the race and became the running mate of Evan Bayh. The Bayh/O'Bannon ticket was successful, and O'Bannon served in the role of lieutenant governor for eight years. In this position, he served as President of the State Senate and directed the state's agriculture and commerce programs.

With Bayh ineligible to seek a third consecutive term as governor in 1996, O'Bannon ran for governor that year. He was initially considered a heavy underdog but emerged a narrow victor over Indianapolis Mayor Stephen Goldsmith. He was re-elected in 2000, defeating Congressman David M. McIntosh. As governor, O'Bannon was known for advocating for education-related issues and helping to create the state's Amber alert system. He presided over a period of economic prosperity for the state in the 1990s and served a term as chairman of the Midwestern Governors Association. O'Bannon died in office in 2003 and was succeeded by Lieutenant Governor Joe Kernan. O'Bannon is the most recent state governor to have died in office.

== Early life and education ==
O'Bannon was a native of Corydon, Indiana (the first state capital of Indiana), where his family owned The Corydon Democrat, the town's newspaper. His father, Robert Presley O'Bannon, served in the Indiana House of Representatives and later served in the Indiana Senate. His mother was the former Faith Dropsey. Frank's great-grandfather was named for his uncle, Presley Neville O'Bannon, a First Lieutenant in the United States Marine Corps who was the first to raise the US flag on foreign soil in a time of war, on April 27, 1805, during the Tripoli Campaign in the First Barbary War. He attended Indiana University Bloomington, where he played one season of basketball for the Hoosiers. At Indiana University, he was president of the Zeta chapter of the Phi Gamma Delta fraternity. He earned a Bachelor of Arts in government in 1952, and a Juris Doctor in 1957 from the Indiana University School of Law.

He also spent two years in the United States Air Force and became a first lieutenant. While at Indiana University, he met his wife, Judith Asmus, on a blind date. They married in 1957, and had three children. Following law school, he opened a law office in Corydon, was chairman of the board of the family newspaper publishing firm (a position he held until the time of his death), and was a member of the board of the Corydon Savings and Loan.

== Political career ==
=== Indiana Senate ===
First elected to the state senate in 1969-70 to a seat occupied by his father, Robert P. O'Bannon, from 1950 to 1970, Frank O'Bannon was the primary sponsor of legislation reintroducing the death penalty. He rose to the rank of Senate Minority Leader among Democrats during his tenure in the legislative body. He served one two-year stint as chair of the Senate Finance Committee following a short-lived Democratic majority.

=== Lieutenant Governor of Indiana ===
On January 13, 1987, O'Bannon announced he would run for governor in 1988. He formally launched his campaign in May 1987 from Corydon, Indiana, touting his legislative experience. O'Bannon initially faced off against then-Secretary of State Evan Bayh and Kokomo Mayor Steve Daily. O'Bannon abandoned his own bid for governor in January 1988 and ran for Lieutenant Governor with Bayh. The ticket was victorious in November, and O'Bannon was elected as the 46th Lieutenant Governor of Indiana. His candidacy for lieutenant governor matched that of his grandfather, Lew M. O'Bannon, who was the 1924 Democratic nominee for the state's second-highest office. As lieutenant governor, he presided as President of the State Senate, served as the state's Director of Commerce and Commissioner of Agriculture.

=== Governor of Indiana ===
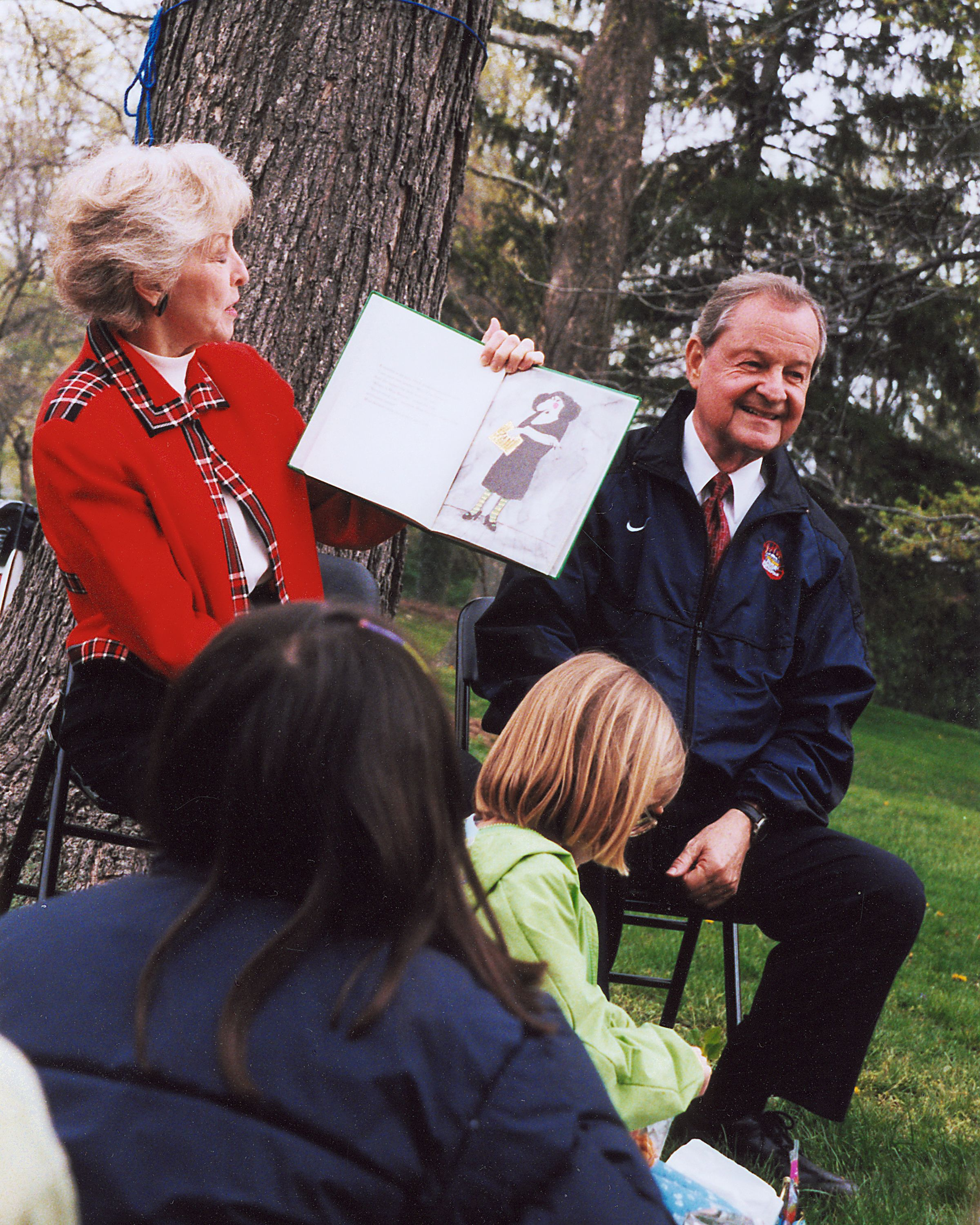
Governor Frank O'Bannon and First Lady Judy O'Bannon read to schoolchildren at the annual Reading Day at the Residence in 1999

In 1996, with Evan Bayh ineligible to seek a third consecutive term as governor due to term limits, O'Bannon became the Democratic nominee for governor. He overcame an early deficit in the polls against his Republican opponent, Indianapolis mayor Stephen Goldsmith and won in a close race, 52% to 47%. He was re-elected by a larger margin, 57% to 42%, in 2000 against second district Congressman David M. McIntosh.

During the boom years of the 1990s, when Indiana amassed a record $2 billion surplus, O'Bannon was able to cut taxes by $1.5 billion, hire 500 more police officers in the state and win increased funding for schools and extended health insurance for poor families. He also signed landmark legislation creating the Amber alert program in Indiana, as well as legislation requiring drivers to slow or change lanes for emergency vehicles stopped along Hoosier roadways.

In the years of 1998 and 1999 O'Bannon served as the Chairman of Midwestern Governors Association. In 1999, O'Bannon created the Public Access Counselor Office by executive order after a statewide collaboration of seven newspapers found great obstacles in obtaining government information in Indiana. In 1999, the Indiana General Assembly established it by statute.

In 2000 he won an easy re-election bid under the theme of Keeping Indiana Moving in the Right Direction. Furthermore, he was seen as a tough candidate to beat owing to his own personal affability. His opponent in the election, 2nd District Congressman David McIntosh said: "Everywhere I'd go, people would say that to me: 'How are you going to run against someone who is everyone's grandfather?'" His campaign featured memorable advertisements with O'Bannon reprising his basketball past by shooting a perfect jump shot.

After the September 11 attacks and subsequent market downturn, Indiana lost 120,000 jobs, tax revenues dropped, and O'Bannon had to cut social services and other services in order to spare education. In 2001 he worked with the state legislature to formulate a major restructuring of the state tax system. His opponents blamed him for various problems arising in the second term, including a slow response by his environmental agency to a big fish kill, and problems at two-state centers for the developmentally disabled.

His record, however, was firmly established as an educational leader for the state. He helped lead development of Indiana's first community college system, pushed for early-childhood learning opportunities, development of alternative high schools, and charter schools. His work as chair of the state's landmark Education Roundtable ensured that Indiana was one of only five states whose schools immediately qualified as meeting all standards set by the federal No Child Left Behind act upon enactment. In regards to education, O’Bannon placed emphasis on enhancing the state's public schools. He was able to pass increased funding for education . However, the state legislature did not pass O'Bannon's proposal for full-day kindergarten.

O'Bannon attempted to install a stone monument featuring the Ten Commandments on the state capitol grounds. However, the courts blocked this effort.

== Death and legacy ==
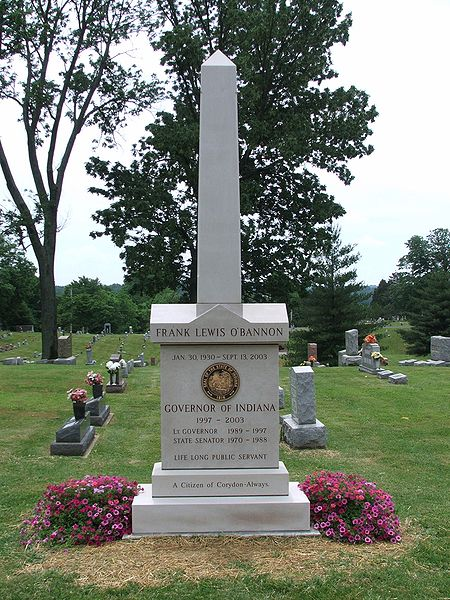
Frank O'Bannon's grave.

O'Bannon suffered a massive stroke on September 8, 2003, while he was in Chicago attending the U.S. Midwest–Japan trade conference. He was taken to Northwestern Memorial Hospital where he remained unconscious, and his condition worsened over the following days. In accordance with his living will, his family discontinued further treatment, and he died on September 13, aged 73. O'Bannon donated organs (having signed legislation making organ donation easier in Indiana), including his cornea, which helped an Illinois woman regain her sight. His ashes were interred at Cedar Hill Cemetery in his hometown of Corydon, Indiana.

O'Bannon was succeeded in office by Lieutenant Governor Joe Kernan of South Bend, who was sworn into office just hours after O'Bannon's death.

O'Bannon is the subject of the 2006 biography Legacy of a Governor: The Life of Indiana's Frank O'Bannon.

In February 2006, a memorial bust of O'Bannon was placed outside the Indiana Statehouse Senate chambers.

Judy O'Bannon resided in her husband's hometown of Corydon, Indiana, and remained active in Democratic politics and in her husband's newspaper, The Corydon Democrat. She hosted a statewide public television program, Communities Building Community. In November 2013, she married Donald Willsey.

== See also ==
- List of governors of Indiana

Indiana Senate
| Preceded by Robert O'Bannon | Member of the Indiana Senate from the 29th district 1970–1972 | Succeeded by Leslie Duvall |
| Preceded by Constituency established | Member of the Indiana Senate from the 46th district 1972–1982 | Succeeded by Clay Patterson Baird |
| Preceded by Michael Charles Kendall | Member of the Indiana Senate from the 47th district 1982–1988 | Succeeded by Richard D. Young |
Political offices
| Preceded by John Mutz | Lieutenant Governor of Indiana; 1989–1997 | Succeeded by Joe Kernan |
| Preceded by Evan Bayh | Governor of Indiana; 1997–2003 | Succeeded by Joe Kernan |
Party political offices
| Preceded by Ann DeLaney | Democratic nominee for Lieutenant Governor of Indiana; 1988, 1992 | Succeeded by Joe Kernan |
| Preceded by Evan Bayh | Democratic nominee for Governor of Indiana; 1996, 2000 | Succeeded by Joe Kernan |
| Preceded by Pedro Rosselló | Chair of the Democratic Governors Association; 1998–1999 | Succeeded by Paul E. Patton |
