= Robert Presley O'Bannon =

American politician (1898–1987)

Robert Presley O'Bannon (September 10, 1898 – June 16, 1987) was an American politician. He was a member of the Indiana Senate.

O'Bannon was a descendant of American military officer and Kentucky State Senator Presley O'Bannon. He was born in Corydon, Indiana.

The junior O'Bannon served in the United States Army during World War I after graduating from Corydon Central High School. After the war, he graduated from Purdue University.

In 1925, O'Bannon married Faith Dropsey. The couple would have five children, one of whom died as a newborn baby in 1936.

From 1943 to 1970, O'Bannon was the owner and publisher of the Corydon Democrat newspaper. In 1950, he won a seat in the Indiana Senate as a member of the Democratic Party. Along the way, he was Chairman of the Senate Finance Committee. O'Bannon retired from the Senate in 1970.

In 1971, O'Bannon was inducted in the Indiana Journalism Hall of Fame. .

Their son Frank O'Bannon succeeded his father in the State Senate and as publisher of the Corydon Democrat. He later became Lieutenant Governor of Indiana in 1989 and Governor of Indiana in 1997. O'Bannon was still in office when he died of a stroke.
