= Bust of Frank O'Bannon =

Public artwork by Kenneth G. Ryden

Frank O'Bannon bust
- Artist: Kenneth G. Ryden
- Year: 2005
- Type: Bronze
- Dimensions: 91 cm × 43 cm × 24 cm (36 in × 17 in × 9.5 in)
- Location: Indiana Statehouse; Indianapolis, Indiana
- Owner: State of Indiana

Frank O'Bannon is a public artwork by American artist Kenneth G. Ryden, located in the Indiana Statehouse rotunda in Indianapolis, Indiana. The 700-pound (320 kg) bronze bust was commissioned by the state to honor the memory of Indiana's 47th governor, Frank O'Bannon. The piece was cast at the Anderson University Art Foundry in 2005 and presented to the state in February 2006.

== Description ==
The 700-pound (320 kg) bust is made entirely of bronze. Its full height is 36 inches (910 mm). The base of the piece takes up a 14.5-by-9.5-inch (370 mm × 240 mm) footprint. At the governor's shoulders, the bust's widest point, the work is 17 inches (430 mm). The piece depicts O'Bannon, from chest up, wearing a dress shirt and tie. At the request of Judy O'Bannon, the governor's wife, the artist specifically included O'Bannon's true-to-life crooked nose and his broad smile.

== Historical information ==
After O'Bannon's death in 2003, the Indiana State Legislature formed the Frank O'Bannon Memorial Commission to create a bust to honor the memory of the late governor. The committee was co-chaired by Senator James Merritt and Representative Paul Robertson. Kenneth G. Ryden was chosen from a pool of six artists to create the memorial. The choice was based on recommendations of artists from the Indiana Arts Commission and the Indiana Historical Society. The artist was paid $20,000 in private funds for the work. The bronze bust was cast at the Anderson University Art Foundry in December 2005. The completed work was unveiled in the Statehouse on February 13, 2006. In 2009, the creative process behind the making of this bust, as well as a memorial statue in O'Bannon's hometown, was featured in Indianapolis PBS station WFYI's special presentation, Cast in Bronze.

=== Location history ===
Frank O'Bannon can be found on the third floor of the Indiana Statehouse. It sits across from the entrance to the Senate chambers where Frank O'Bannon served as both state senator and Lieutenant Governor. At the recommendation of The Commission to Recommend a State House Memorial for Governor O'Bannon, this bust replaced that of Calvin Fletcher, which was moved to the fourth floor of the Indiana Statehouse.

== Artist ==
Kenneth G. Ryden was born in Chicago and lives in Yorktown, Indiana. The artist works primarily in bronze, creating both abstract and figural sculptures using the lost-wax casting technique. On sculpting people, Ryden says, "I use the human form as a vehicle for the communication I am trying to establish." Ryden has created a number of memorial statues and busts, including those honoring pitcher Carl Erskine and Martin Luther King Jr. His work in Anderson, Indiana, includes Crucible of Peace, The Beloved, and The Graces. The artist also has done outdoor sculpture work in Springfield, Illinois, and other cities around the Midwest.

=== The artist and the memorial ===
At the time of commission, Ryden was artist-in-residence at Anderson University. Speaking of O'Bannon, the artist has said that he was impressed by the late governor's down-to-earth personality and hoped this memorial would inspire visitors to the Statehouse to learn more about O'Bannon. "I felt he made the high office of governor seem accessible. My big challenge is to show this in the work that I do." The artist gathered many photographs and worked closely with O'Bannon's wife and daughter to achieve this. At the official unveiling ceremony, Ryden dedicated the work to the O'Bannon family and to the state.
