= List of United States governors who died in office =

This is a list of United States governors who died in office.

== List ==
| Governor | | | Death and burial | | | | | |
| Governor | Party | State | Date of death | Age at death (years) | Cause | Place of death | Place of burial | Source |
|---|---|---|---|---|---|---|---|---|
| Archibald Bulloch | None | Georgia | February 22, 1777 | 47 | Possibly poisoned | Savannah, Georgia | Colonial Park Cemetery, Savannah, Georgia | |
| William Livingston | Federalist | New Jersey | July 25, 1790 | 66 | Unknown | Elizabeth, New Jersey | Green-Wood Cemetery, Brooklyn, New York City | |
| George Plater | Federalist | Maryland | February 10, 1792 | 56 | Unknown | Annapolis, Maryland | Sotterley, Maryland | |
| John Hancock | None | Massachusetts | October 8, 1793 | 56 | Natural causes | Hancock Manor, Boston, Massachusetts | Granary Burying Ground, Boston, Massachusetts | |
| Samuel Huntington | Federalist | Connecticut | January 5, 1796 | 64 | Dropsy | Norwich, Connecticut | Old Norwichtown Cemetery, Norwich, Connecticut | |
| Thomas Chittenden | None | Vermont | August 25, 1797 | 67 | Unknown | Williston, Vermont | Thomas Chittenden Cemetery, Williston, Vermont | |
| Gunning Bedford | Federalist | Delaware | September 30, 1797 | 55 | unknown | New Castle, Delaware | Immanuel Episcopal Church Cemetery, New Castle, Delaware | |
| Oliver Wolcott | Federalist | Connecticut | December 1, 1797 | 71 | Natural causes | Litchfield, Connecticut | East Cemetery, Litchfield, Connecticut | |
| Increase Sumner | Federalist | Massachusetts | June 7, 1799 | 52 | Angina pectoris | Roxbury, Massachusetts | Granary Burying Ground | |
| Edward Rutledge | Federalist | South Carolina | January 23, 1800 | 50 | Gout | Charleston, South Carolina | Saint Philip's Episcopal Church Cemetery, Charleston, South Carolina | |
| Moses Gill | None | Massachusetts | May 20, 1800 | 67 | Unknown | Boston, Massachusetts | Unknown | |
| Arthur Fenner | Country | Rhode Island | October 15, 1805 | 59 | Unknown | Providence, Rhode Island | Unknown | |
| James Sullivan | Democratic-Republican | Massachusetts | December 10, 1808 | 64 | Unknown | Boston, Massachusetts | Granary Burying Ground | |
| Jonathan Trumbull Jr. | Federalist | Connecticut | August 7, 1809 | 69 | Unknown | Lebanon, Connecticut | Unknown | |
| George William Smith | Democratic-Republican | Virginia | December 26, 1811 | 49 | Richmond Theatre fire | Richmond, Virginia | Monumental Church, Richmond, Virginia | |
| Roger Griswold | Federalist | Connecticut | October 25, 1812 | 50 | Unknown | Norwich, Connecticut | Griswold Cemetery, Lyme, Connecticut | |
| George Madison | Democratic-Republican | Kentucky | October 14, 1816 | 53 | unknown | Paris, Bourbon County, Kentucky | Frankfort Cemetery, Frankfort, Franklin County, Kentucky | |
| William Rabun | Democratic-Republican | Georgia | October 24, 1819 | 48 | fever | Hancock County, Georgia | Powelton Baptist Church, Powelton, Hancock County, Georgia | |
| William Wyatt Bibb | Democratic-Republican | Alabama | July 10, 1820 | 38 | Riding accident | Elmore County, Alabama | Coosada, Alabama | |
| John Collins | Democratic-Republican | Delaware | April 16, 1822 | 46 | unknown | Nanticoke Hundred, Sussex County, Delaware | unknown | |
| Joseph Haslet | Democratic-Republican | Delaware | June 20, 1823 | 53-54 | Unknown | Cedar Creek Hundred, Sussex County, Delaware | Odd Fellows Cemetery, Milford, Delaware | |
| William Eustis | Democratic-Republican | Massachusetts | February 6, 1825 | 71 | pneumonia | Boston, Massachusetts | Granary Burying Ground | |
| Frederick Bates | Democratic-Republican | Missouri | August 4, 1825 | 48 | pneumonia | Chesterfield, Missouri | Thornhill estate | |
| Walter Leake | Democratic-Republican | Mississippi | November 17, 1825 | 63 | unknown | Hinds County, Mississippi | unknown | |
| DeWitt Clinton | Democratic-Republican | New York | February 11, 1828 | 58 | heart failure | Albany, New York | old Swan Street Cemetery | |
| George Izard | Democratic-Republican | Arkansas Territory | November 22, 1828 | 52 | Gout | Little Rock, Arkansas | Mount Holly Cemetery | |
| Pierre Derbigny | National Republican | Louisiana | October 6, 1829 | 60 | carriage accident | Gretna, Jefferson Parish, Louisiana | Saint Louis Cemetery, New Orleans, Louisiana | |
| Enoch Lincoln | Democratic-Republican | Maine | October 8, 1829 | 40 | unknown | Augusta, Kennebec County, Maine | Augusta, Kennebec County, Maine | |
| Daniel Martin | National Republican | Maryland | July 11, 1831 | 50 | Fell off his horse | Talbot County, Maryland | Spring Hill Cemetery, Easton, Maryland | |
| Abram M. Scott | National Republican | Mississippi | June 12, 1833 | 48 | cholera | Jackson, Mississippi | unknown | |
| John Breathitt | Democrat | Kentucky | February 21, 1834 | 47 | Tuberculosis | Frankfort, Kentucky | Maple Grove Cemetery, Breathitt County, Kentucky | |
| Caleb P. Bennett | Democrat | Delaware | May 9, 1836 | 77 | unknown | Wilmington, Delaware | Friends Burial Ground, Wilmington, Delaware | |
| James Clark | Whig | Kentucky | August 27, 1839 | 60 | unknown | Frankfort, Kentucky | Winchester, Kentucky | |
| Patrick Noble | Democrat | South Carolina | April 7, 1840 | 52-53 | Unknown | Columbia, South Carolina | Willington Cemetery, McCormick County, South Carolina | |
| Thomas Reynolds | Democrat | Missouri | February 9, 1844 | 47 | suicide | Jefferson City, Missouri | Woodlawn Cemetery, Jefferson City, Missouri | |
| Thomas Stockton | Whig | Delaware | March 2, 1846 | 64 | unknown | New Castle, Delaware | Immanuel Episcopal Church Cemetery | |
| Joseph Maull | Whig | Delaware | May 3, 1846 | 64 | unknown | Lewes, Sussex County, Delaware | St. Peter's Episcopal Churchyard | |
| William Henry Bissell | Republican | Illinois | March 18, 1860 | 48 | unknown | Springfield, Sangamon County, illinois | Oak Ridge Cemetery, Springfield, Sangamon County, illinois | |
| Ashbel P. Willard | Democrat | Indiana | October 4, 1860 | 39 | internal bleeding | Saint Paul, Ramsey County, Minnesota | New Albany | |
| John Willis Ellis | Democrat | North Carolina | July 7, 1861 | 40 | unknown | Red Sulphur Springs, West Virginia | Old English Cemetery, Salisbury, North Carolina | |
| Louis P. Harvey | Republican | Wisconsin | April 19, 1862 | 41 | Drowning | Savannah, Tennessee | Forest Hill Cemetery, Madison, Wisconsin | |
| Hamilton Rowan Gamble | Republican | Missouri | January 31, 1864 | 65 | infection | unknown | Bellefontaine Cemetery, St. Louis, Missouri | |
| William Cannon | Republican | Delaware | March 1, 1865 | 55 | unknown | Bridgeville, Sussex County, Delaware | Bridgeville Methodist Cemetery | |
| John Milton | Democrat | Florida | April 1, 1865 | 57 | gunshot wound | Marianna, Jackson County, Florida | Saint Luke's Episcopal Cemetery, Marianna, Jackson County, Florida | |
| John Brough | Union | Ohio | August 29, 1865 | 53 | Gangrene | Cleveland, Ohio | Woodland Cemetery, Cleveland, Ohio | |
| John L. Helm | Democrat | Kentucky | September 8, 1867 | 65 | unknown | Elizabethtown, Hardin County, Kentucky | Helm Place, Hardin County, Kentucky | |
| Peter T. Washburn | Republican | Vermont | February 7, 1870 | 55 | Unknown | Woodstock, Vermont | River Street Cemetery, Woodstock, Vermont | |
| Ossian B. Hart | Republican | Florida | March 18, 1874 | 53 | pneumonia | Jacksonville, Jackson County, Florida | Evergreen Cemetery, Jacksonville, Florida | |
| Tod Robinson Caldwell | Republican | North Carolina | July 11, 1874 | 56 | cholera morbus | Hillsborough, North Carolina | Forest Hill Cemetery, Morganton, North Carolina | |
| James D. Williams | Democrat | Indiana | November 20, 1880 | 72 | Pyelonephritis | Indianapolis, Marion County, Indiana | Walnut Grove Cemetery, Knox County, Indiana | |
| Louis A. Wiltz | Democrat | Louisiana | October 16, 1881 | 38 | tuberculosis | New Orleans, Louisiana | unknown | |
| Alexander H. Stephens | Democrat | Georgia | March 4, 1883 | 71 | unknown | Crawfordville, Georgia | A. H. Stephens State Park, Taliaferro County, Georgia | |
| Washington Bartlett | Democrat | California | September 12, 1887 | 63 | Bright's disease | Oakland, California | Mountain View Cemetery Oakland, California | |
| Joseph R. Bodwell | Republican | Maine | December 15, 1887 | 67 | unknown | Hallowell, Kennebec County, Maine | unknown | |
| John S. Marmaduke | Democrat | Missouri | December 28, 1887 | 54 | pneumonia | Jefferson City, Missouri | Woodland Cemetery, Jefferson City, Missouri | |
| Daniel Gould Fowle | Democrat | North Carolina | April 7, 1891 | 60 | unknown | Raleigh, North Carolina | Oakwood Cemetery, Raleigh, North Carolina | |
| Alvin Peterson Hovey | Republican | Indiana | November 23, 1891 | 70 | unknown | Indianapolis, Marion County, Indiana | Bellefontaine Cemetery, Posey County, Indiana | |
| Joshua H. Marvil | Republican | Delaware | April 8, 1895 | 69 | unknown | Laurel, Sussex County, Delaware | Laurel Hill Cemeterym, Laurel, Sussex County, Delaware | |
| Frederic T. Greenhalge | Republican | Massachusetts | March 5, 1896 | 53 | Kidney disease | Lowell, Massachusetts | Lowell Cemetery | |
| William Goebel | Democrat | Kentucky | February 3, 1900 | 44 | gunshot wound | Frankfort, Kentucky | unknown | |
| William J. Samford | Democrat | Alabama | June 11, 1901 | 56 | Unknown | Tuscaloosa, Alabama | Unknown | |
| William Gregory | Republican | Rhode Island | December 16, 1901 | 52 | Bright's disease | North Kingstown, Rhode Island | Unknown | |
| John Rankin Rogers | Democrat | Washington | December 26, 1901 | 63 | Lobar pneumonia | Olympia, Washington | Woodbine Cemetery, Puyallup, Washington | |
| DeForest Richards | Republican | Wyoming | April 28, 1903 | 56 | kidney disease | Cheyenne, Wyoming | Lakeview Cemetery, Cheyenne, Wyoming | |
| John M. Pattison | Democrat | Ohio | June 18, 1906 | 59 | Bright's disease | Milford, Ohio | Greenlawn Cemetery, Milford, Ohio | |
| Samuel G. Cosgrove | Republican | Washington | March 28, 1909 | 61 | heart attack | Paso Robles, California | Masonic Memorial Park, Tumwater, Washington | |
| George L. Lilley | Republican | Connecticut | April 21, 1909 | 49 | Unknown | Hartford, Connecticut | Riverside Cemetery, Waterbury, Connecticut | |
| John Albert Johnson | Democrat | Minnesota | September 21, 1909 | 48 | Complications from surgery | Rochester, Minnesota | Unknown | |
| Winfield Scott Hammond | Democrat | Minnesota | December 30, 1915 | 52 | stroke | Clinton, Louisiana | Unknown | |
| Ezequiel Cabeza De Baca | Democrat | New Mexico | February 18, 1917 | 52 | Unknown | Santa Fe, New Mexico | Mount Calvary Cemetery Las Vegas, New Mexico | |
| James Withycombe | Republican | Oregon | March 3, 1919 | 64 | heart condition | Salem, Oregon | City View Cemetery, Salem, Oregon | |
| Ernest Lister | Democrat | Washington | June 14, 1919 | 48 | heart and kidney disease | Seattle, Washington | Tacoma Cemetery, Tacoma, Washington | |
| Frederic Hale Parkhurst | Republican | Maine | January 31, 1921 | 56 | pneumonia | Augusta, Kennebec County, Maine | Mount Hope Cemetery, Bangor, Penobscot County, Maine | |
| William B. Ross | Democrat | Wyoming | October 2, 1924 | 50 | complications due to an Appendectomy | Cheyenne, Wyoming | Lakeview Cemetery, Cheyenne, Wyoming | |
| Henry L. Fuqua | Democrat | Louisiana | October 11, 1926 | 60 | unknown | Baton Rouge, East Baton Rouge Parish, Louisiana | Roselawn Cemetery, Baton Rouge, East Baton Rouge Parish, Louisiana | |
| Henry L. Whitfield | Democrat | Mississippi | March 18, 1927 | 58 | unknown | Jackson, Mississippi | Friendship Cemetery, Columbus, Mississippi | |
| Austin Peay | Democrat | Tennessee | October 2, 1927 | 51 | Intracerebral hemorrhage | Nashville, Tennessee | Greenwood Cemetery, Clarksville, Tennessee | |
| Aram J. Pothier | Republican | Rhode Island | February 4, 1928 | 73 | unknown | Woonsocket, Rhode Island | L'Eglise du Precieux Sang, Woonsocket, Rhode Island | |
| I. L. Patterson | Republican | Oregon | December 21, 1929 | 70 | Pneumonia | Eola, Oregon | Mount Crest Abbey, Salem, Oregon | |
| Frank Emerson | Republican | Wyoming | February 18, 1931 | 48 | pneumonia | Cheyenne, Wyoming | Lakeview Cemetery, Cheyenne, Wyoming | |
| Arthur Seligman | Democrat | New Mexico | September 25, 1933 | 62 | Heart attack | Santa Fe, New Mexico | Fairview Cemetery, Santa Fe, New Mexico | |
| James Rolph | Republican | California | June 2, 1934 | 64 | Heart attack | Santa Clara County, California | Greenlawn Memorial Park Colma, California | |
| Frank Henry Cooney | Democrat | Montana | December 15, 1935 | 62 | heart failure | Great Falls, Montana | Saint Mary Cemetery, Missoula | |
| Oscar K. Allen | Democrat | Louisiana | January 28, 1936 | 53 | Brain hemorrhage | Baton Rouge, East Baton Rouge Parish, Louisiana | unknown | |
| Floyd B. Olson | Farmer–Labor | Minnesota | August 22, 1936 | 44 | stomach cancer | Rochester, Minnesota | Unknown | |
| Frank Fitzgerald | Republican | Michigan | March 16, 1939 | 54 | Heart attack | Grand Ledge, Michigan | Oakwood Cemetery, Grand Ledge, Michigan | |
| Henry Horner | Democrat | Illinois | October 6, 1940 | 61 | Complications from stroke | Winnetka, Cook County, Illinois | Zion Gardens Cemetery, Chicago, Illinois | |
| Joseph Emile Harley | Democrat | South Carolina | February 27, 1942 | 61 | Cancer | Columbia, South Carolina | Baptist Cemetery, Barnwell, South Carolina | |
| Paul B. Johnson Sr. | Democrat | Mississippi | December 26, 1943 | 63 | heart attack | Hattiesburg, Mississippi | unknown | |
| Thomas L. Bailey | Democrat | Mississippi | November 2, 1946 | 58 | Stroke | Jackson, Mississippi | unknown | |
| Walter Samuel Goodland | Republican | Wisconsin | March 12, 1947 | 84 | heart attack | Madison, Wisconsin | Graceland Cemetery, Racine, Wisconsin | |
| Earl Snell | Republican | Oregon | October 28, 1947 | 52 | Plane crash | Near Dog Lake, Lake County, Oregon | Belcrest Memorial Park, Salem, Oregon | |
| James L. McConaughy | Republican | Connecticut | March 7, 1948 | 60 | Coronary thrombosis | Hartford, Connecticut | Unknown | |
| Sidney Preston Osborn | Democrat | Arizona | May 25, 1948 | 64 | Amyotrophic lateral sclerosis | Phoenix, Arizona | Greenwood/Memory Lawn Mortuary & Cemetery, Phoenix, Arizona | |
| Beauford H. Jester | Democrat | Texas | July 11, 1949 | 56 | heart attack | Houston, Texas | Oakwood Cemetery, Corsicana, Texas | |
| Daniel T. McCarty | Democrat | Florida | September 28, 1953 | 41 | pneumonia | Tallahassee, Leon County, Florida | Palms Cemetery | |
| William B. Umstead | Democrat | North Carolina | November 7, 1954 | 59 | Common Cold | Durham, North Carolina | Mount Tabor Church, Rougemont, North Carolina | |
| William S. Beardsley | Republican | Iowa | November 21, 1954 | 53 | car accident | Des Moines, Polk County, Iowa | New Virginia cemetery, New Virginia, Iowa | |
| Paul L. Patterson | Republican | Oregon | January 31, 1956 | 55 | Coronary occlusion | Portland, Oregon | River View Cemetery, Portland, Oregon | |
| Clinton Clauson | Democrat | Maine | December 30, 1959 | 64 | unknown | Augusta, Kennebec County, Maine | Pine Grove Cemetery | |
| Ralph G. Brooks | Democrat | Nebraska | September 9, 1960 | 62 | heart failure | Lincoln, Nebraska | Lincoln Memorial Park, Lincoln, Nebraska | |
| Donald Grant Nutter | Republican | Montana | January 25, 1962 | 46 | plane crash | Wolf Creek, Montana | Sidney City Cemetery, Sidney, Montana | |
| Lurleen Wallace | Democrat | Alabama | May 7, 1968 | 41 | Colon cancer | Montgomery, Alabama | Greenwood Cemetery, Montgomery, Alabama | |
| Wesley Bolin | Democrat | Arizona | March 4, 1978 | 68 | Heart attack | Phoenix, Arizona | Multiple locations | |
| Hugh Gallen | Democrat | New Hampshire | December 29, 1982 | 58 | Blood infection | Boston, Massachusetts | Saint Rose of Lima New Catholic Cemetery, Littleton, New Hampshire | |
| Richard A. Snelling | Republican | Vermont | August 13, 1991 | 64 | Heart attack | Shelburne, Vermont | Shelburne Village Cemetery. Shelburne, Vermont | |
| George S. Mickelson | Republican | South Dakota | April 19, 1993 | 52 | plane crash | near Dubuque, Iowa | Greenwood Cemetery, Brookings, South Dakota | |
| Lawton Chiles | Democrat | Florida | December 12, 1998 | 68 | Heart attack | Tallahassee, Florida | "Jubilee", Chiles family estate, Tallahassee, Florida | |
| Mel Carnahan | Democrat | Missouri | October 16, 2000 | 66 | plane crash | near Hillsboro, Missouri | Carson Hill Cemetery, Mill Spring, Missouri | |
| Frank O'Bannon | Democrat | Indiana | September 13, 2003 | 73 | stroke | Chicago, Illinois | Cedar Hill Cemetery, Corydon, Indiana | |
| Eloy Inos | Republican | Northern Mariana Islands | December 28, 2015 | 66 | Complications while recovering from open-heart surgery | Seattle, Washington | Unknown | |
| Arnold Palacios | Republican | Northern Mariana Islands | July 23, 2025 | 69 | medical incident | Dededo, Guam | Unknown | |

== See also ==
- Gubernatorial lines of succession in the United States
