= Richard D. Young =

American politician (1942–2025)

Member of the Indiana Senate from the 47th district
- In office December 10, 1988 – November 5, 2014
- Preceded by: Frank O'Bannon
- Succeeded by: Erin Houchin

Personal details
- Born: December 2, 1942
- Died: December 27, 2025 (aged 83)
- Party: Democratic
- Spouse(s): Elaine Young (her death); Ashira
- Children: 5
- Education: Vincennes University (AB)
- Profession: Businessman; Educator

Richard D. Young (December 2, 1942 – December 27, 2025) was an American politician who was a Democratic member of the Indiana Senate, representing the 47th senate district from 1988 to 2014.

== Early life and education ==
Young was born on December 2, 1942. He had an AB in Behavioral Sciences from Vincennes University.

== Early career ==
Before his tenure in the Indiana Senate, Young was Crawford County Auditor. He was also Secretary of the Crawford County Democrat Central Committee from 1986 to 1988.

== Senate ==
Young represented the 47th District after being appointment to succeed newly elected lieutenant governor Frank O'Bannon in 1988. His district included parts of Crawford, Dubois, Harrison, Perry, Spencer, Warrick and Washington Counties.

He has won election to the Senate in 1990, 1994, 1998, 2002, 2006, and 2010, but lost in the general election to Republican Erin Houchin 21,000 to 15,000 votes in 2014.

He was the Democratic leader of the state senate from 1996 to 2008, but he stepped down to explore a run for Governor of Indiana. From 2008 to 2014 Young served as the Minority Leader Pro Tempore. Young was also a co-founder and member of the Rural Caucus. Young served as the Ranking Democrat on the Agriculture and Natural Resources and Local Government committees.

In 2014, he was the only Democrat in the entire General Assembly to vote for House Joint Resolution 3, the resolution for a ballot vote to ban same sex marriage in Indiana.

=== Committees ===
Corrections, Criminal and Civil Matters, Member

Local Government, Ranking Minority Member

Subcommittee on Civil Matters, Member

Utilities and Technology, Member

== Race for Governor ==
He ran for 2008 Democratic primary for Governor of Indiana but dropped out early on in the primary and chose not to endorse a candidate in the primary between architect Jim Schellinger, and winner, former Congresswoman Jill Long Thompson.

== Personal life and death ==
He and his first wife, Elaine Young, had five children. After the death of his wife, he married his second wife, Ashira, in 2005.

Young died at his home on December 27, 2025, at the age of 83.

Political offices
Preceded by	Democratic Leader of the Indiana State Senate; 1996–2008	Succeeded by Vi Simpson
Preceded by Frank O'Bannon	Member of the Indiana Senate from the 47th district 1988–2014	Succeeded by Erin Houchin
