= Erin Houchin =

American politician (born 1976)

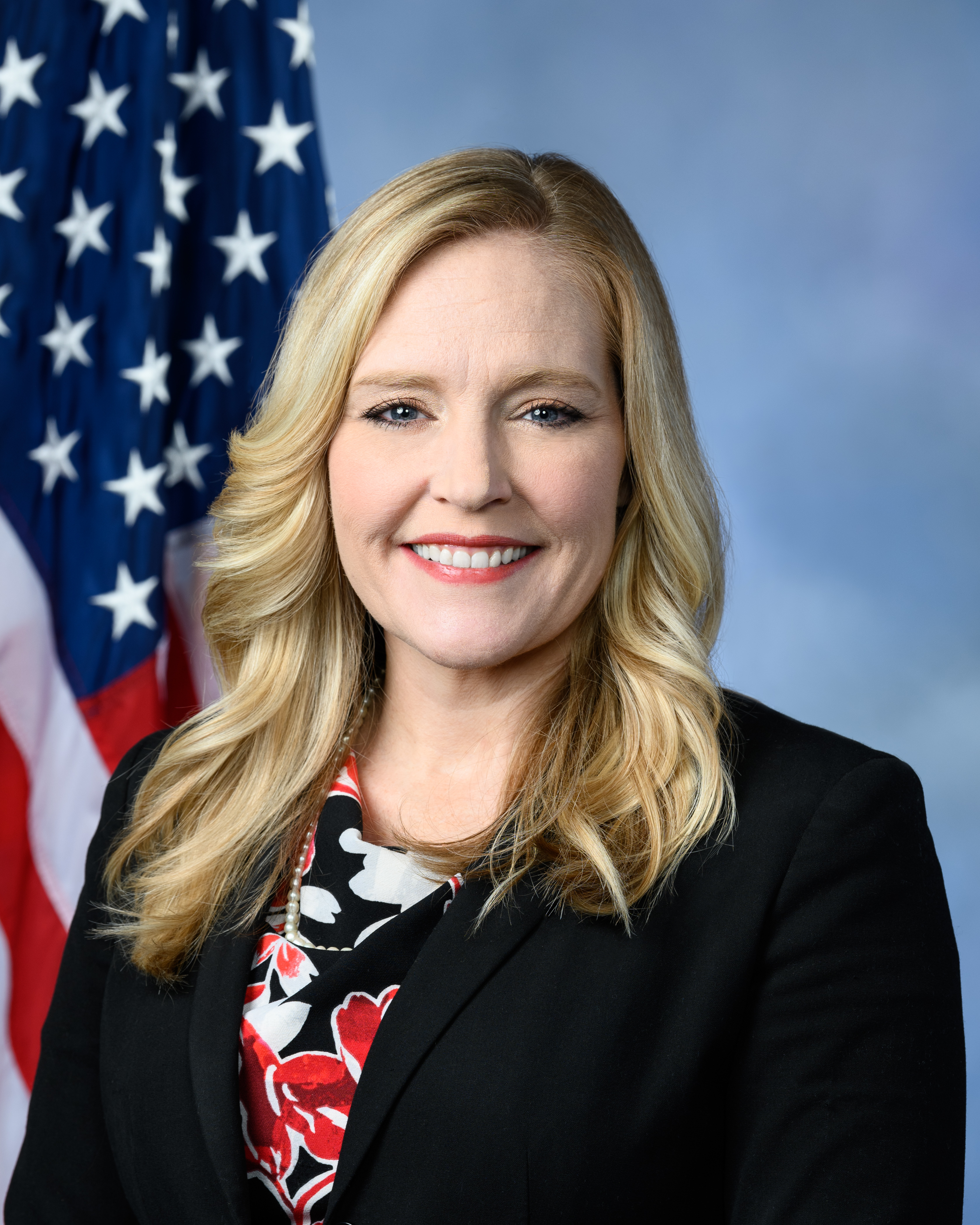
- Official portrait, 2023

Secretary of the House Republican Conference
- Incumbent
- Assumed office January 3, 2025
- Leader: Mike Johnson
- Preceded by: Lisa McClain

Member of the U.S. House of Representatives from Indiana's 9th district
- Incumbent
- Assumed office January 3, 2023
- Preceded by: Trey Hollingsworth

Member of the Indiana Senate from the 47th district
- In office November 18, 2014 – February 4, 2022
- Preceded by: Richard D. Young
- Succeeded by: Gary Byrne

Personal details
- Born: Erin Suzanne Mount; September 24, 1976 (age 50)
- Party: Republican
- Spouse: Dustin Houchin
- Children: 3
- Education: Indiana University, Bloomington (BS); George Washington University (MA)
- Website: House website Campaign website
- Houchin's voice Houchin honoring Charles Eckart, an Indiana veteran. Recorded November 7, 2023

Erin Suzanne Houchin (/ˈhaʊtʃɪn/ HOW-chin; née Mount; born September 24, 1976) is an American politician serving as the U.S. representative for Indiana's 9th congressional district since 2023. A member of the Republican Party, she represented the 47th district in the Indiana Senate from 2014 to 2022.

== Early life and career ==
Houchin was born in Indiana on September 24, 1976, and attended Scottsburg Senior High School. She earned a Bachelor of Arts in psychology from Indiana University Bloomington and a Master of Arts in political management from George Washington University.

Houchin worked as a field manager for U.S. Senator Dan Coats. She was first elected to the Indiana Senate in 2014, defeating incumbent Richard D. Young.

She ran for the United States House of Representatives for Indiana's 9th congressional district in 2016, losing the Republican primary election to Trey Hollingsworth.

== U.S. House of Representatives ==
=== Elections ===
==== 2022 ====
On January 13, 2022, a day after Hollingsworth announced he would not run for reelection, Houchin announced that she was running to succeed him in the 2022 elections. On January 29, 2022, Houchin announced that she was resigning from the state senate on February 4 to focus on her bid for Congress. She won the Republican primary and the November 8 general election against Democratic challenger Matthew Fyfe with 63.6% of the vote.

==== 2024 ====
Houchin easily won re-election in 2024 with an increased vote share of 64.5% over Democratic challenger Tim Peck.

==== 2026 ====
Houchin was re-elected in 2026 with a reduced vote share of 54.0% over Democratic challenger Brad Meyer.

=== Tenure ===
Following the November 2024 elections, Houchin won the internal House Republican Conference elections for secretary (the sixth-highest ranking post in the conference), defeating Mariannette Miller-Meeks of Iowa.

=== Committee assignments ===
For the 118th Congress:

- Committee on Education and the Workforce
  - Subcommittee on Health, Employment, Labor, and Pensions
  - Subcommittee on Higher Education and Workforce Development
- Committee on Financial Services
  - Subcommittee on Capital Markets
  - Subcommittee on Digital Assets, Financial Technology and Inclusion
  - Subcommittee on Housing and Insurance
- Committee on Rules
  - Subcommittee on Rules and the Organization of the House

=== Caucus memberships ===
- Main Street Caucus
- Congressional Western Caucus
- Congressional Caucus on Foster Youth (co-chair)

== Political positions ==
=== Healthcare ===
Houchin voted in 2026 against extending the Affordable Care Act enhanced tax credits.

=== Foreign policy ===
In 2023, Houchin voted in favor of an amendment that would have halted all United States military aid intended to support Ukraine in its defense against the Russian invasion. The amendment failed on a vote of 358–70, with a majority of Republicans (149) and all Democrats (209) voting against it.

== Personal life ==
Houchin's husband, Dustin, is a prosecutor for Washington County, Indiana. They have three children and lived in Salem, Indiana, as of 2014. Dustin ran for a judgeship on the Washington County Superior Court in 2022. Houchin is Protestant and attends Mount Tabor Christian church, a Restorationist church.

U.S. House of Representatives
Preceded by Trey Hollingsworth	Member of the U.S. House of Representatives from Indiana's 9th congressional district 2023–present	Incumbent
Party political offices
Preceded by Lisa McClain	Secretary of the House Republican Conference; 2025–present	Incumbent
U.S. order of precedence (ceremonial)
Preceded by Harriet Hageman	United States representatives by seniority 314th	Succeeded by Val Hoyle
