= Simeon K. Wolfe =

American politician

Simeon Kalfius Wolfe
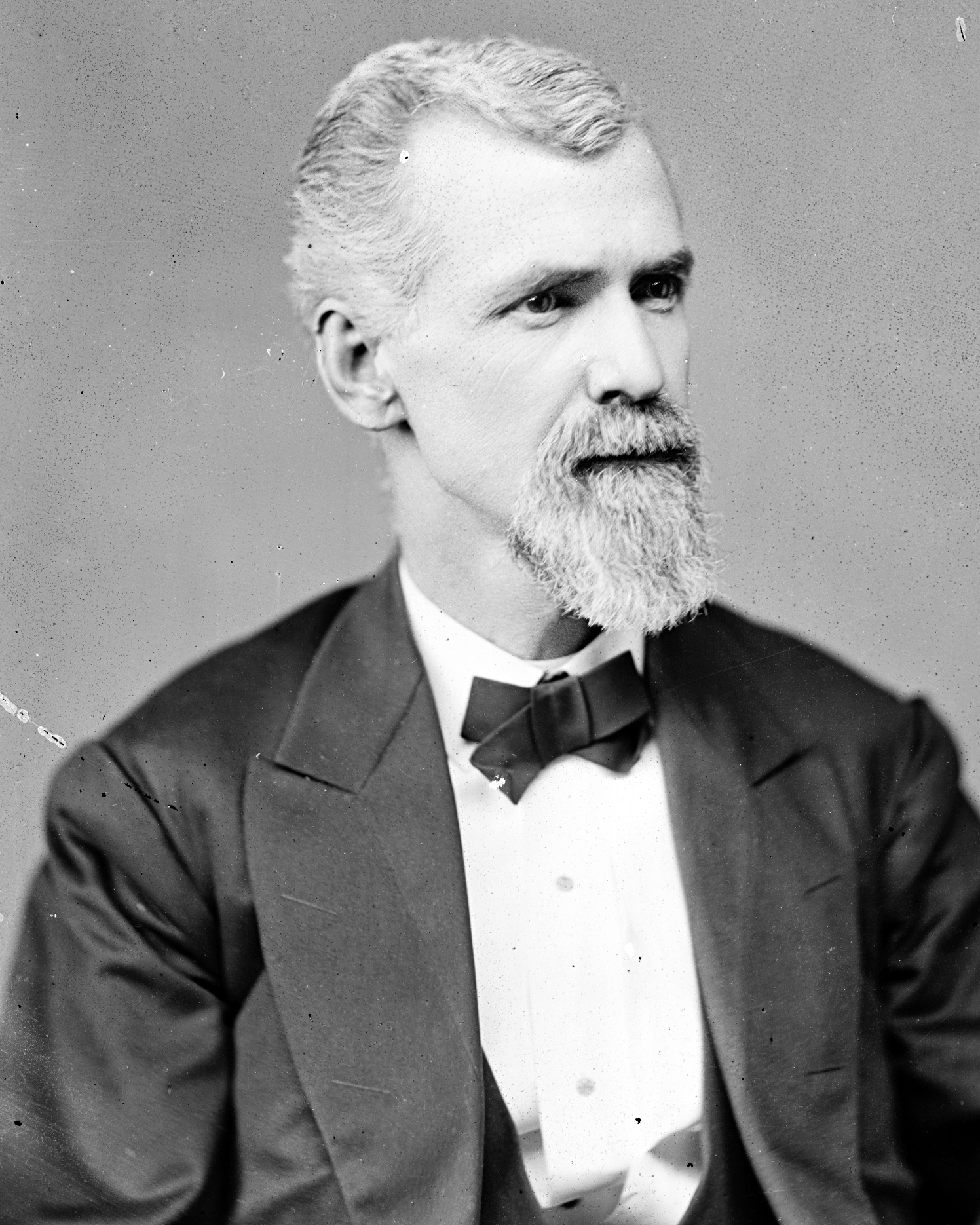

Member of the U.S. House of Representatives from Indiana's 2nd district
- In office March 4, 1873 – March 3, 1875
- Preceded by: Michael C. Kerr
- Succeeded by: James D. Williams

Member of the Indiana Senate
- In office 1860–1864

Personal details
- Born: Simeon Kalfius Wolfe; February 14, 1824 Georgetown, Indiana, U.S.
- Died: November 18, 1888 (aged 64) New Albany, Indiana, U.S.
- Resting place: Fairview Cemetery
- Education: Indiana University Maurer School of Law

Simeon Kalfius Wolfe (February 14, 1824 – November 18, 1888) was an American lawyer and politician who served two terms as a U.S. representative from Indiana from 1873 to 1875.

== Biography ==
Born near Georgetown, Indiana, Wolfe attended Floyd County schools, and graduated from the law department of Indiana University in 1850. He was admitted to the bar in 1851 and commenced practice in Corydon, Indiana.

=== Early career ===
He edited and published the Corydon Democrat from 1857 to 1865. He served as a member of the Indiana State Senate from 1860 to 1864, and as a delegate to the Democratic National Conventions at Charleston and Baltimore in 1860. In 1870, he moved to New Albany, where he continued the practice of law.

== Congress and judicial service ==
Wolfe was elected as a Democrat to the Forty-third Congress (March 4, 1873 – March 3, 1875). He was not a candidate for renomination in 1874, instead resuming the practice of law, and serving as judge of the Floyd and Clark circuit court from 1880 to 1884.

== Death ==
He died in New Albany, Indiana, November 18, 1888, and was interred in Fairview Cemetery.

U.S. House of Representatives
Preceded by Michael C. Kerr	Member of the U.S. House of Representatives from Indiana's 2nd congressional district March 4, 1873 – March 3, 1875	Succeeded by James D. Williams
