= J. Murray Clark =

American politician

Chairman of the Indiana Republican Party
- In office 2006–2010
- Preceded by: Jim Kittle
- Succeeded by: Eric Holcomb

Member of the Indiana Senate from the 29th district
- In office November 9, 1994 – November 14, 2005
- Preceded by: William Lyman Soards
- Succeeded by: Mike Delph

Personal details
- Born: November 3, 1957 (age 68) Indianapolis, Indiana, U.S.
- Party: Republican
- Spouse: Janet
- Children: 4
- Education: Kenyon College (BA); Indiana University, Indianapolis (JD)

J. Murray Clark (born November 3, 1957) is an attorney and former Republican politician from Indiana. He served in the Indiana Senate from 1994 to 2005. He represented the 29th district which consisted portions of Hamilton County and Marion County. Conservative political advocacy group Advance America gave him an 89% rating. He also served as Chairman of the Indiana Republican Party from 2006 to 2010. He was the Republican nominee for lieutenant governor in 2000. He ran alongside David McIntosh. He is a Roman Catholic.

Indiana Senate
Preceded by William Lyman Soards	Member of the Indiana Senate from the 29th district 1994–2005	Succeeded by Mike Delph
Party political offices
Preceded by George Witwer	Republican nominee for Lieutenant Governor of Indiana; 2000	Succeeded by Becky Skillman
Preceded by Jim Kittle	Chairman of the Indiana Republican Party; 2006–2010	Succeeded by Eric Holcomb
