= 2000 Indiana gubernatorial election =

- November 7, 2000
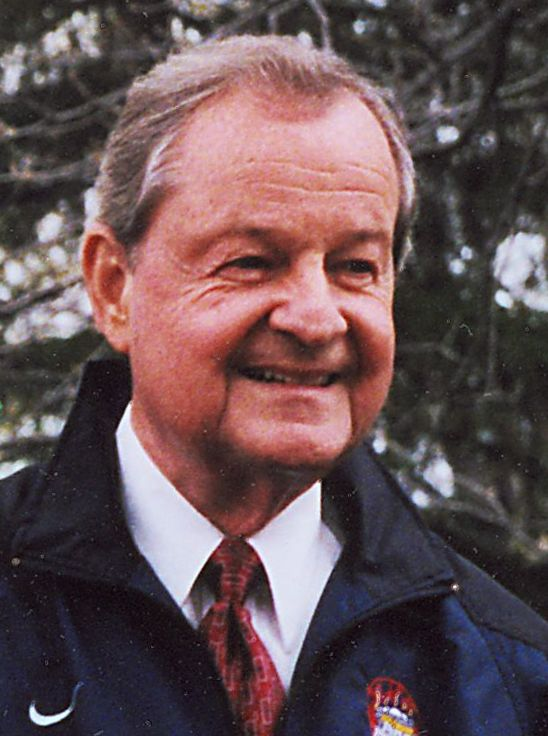

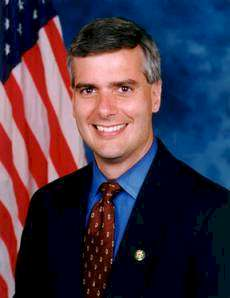
| Nominee | Frank O'Bannon | David McIntosh |
| Party | Democratic | Republican |
| Running mate | Joe Kernan | J. Murray Clark |
| Popular vote | 1,232,525 | 908,285 |
| Percentage | 56.56% | 41.68% |
- County results O'Bannon: 40–50% 50–60% 60–70% 70–80% McIntosh: 40–50% 50–60%
Governor before election
Frank O'Bannon
Democratic
Elected Governor
Frank O'Bannon
Democratic

The 2000 Indiana gubernatorial election was held on November 7, 2000, to elect the governor and lieutenant governor of Indiana. Democratic incumbent Frank O'Bannon was re-elected over U.S. representative David M. McIntosh.

Primary elections were held on May 2. O'Bannon was unopposed for the Democratic nomination, while McIntosh easily defeated a challenge from John Price.

O'Bannon's victory was the fourth consecutive Democratic victory in Indiana gubernatorial elections, the longest winning streak for that party in the state since 1856. As of 2026, this was the last time a Democrat was elected governor of Indiana.

== Democratic primary ==
=== Candidates ===
- Frank O'Bannon, incumbent governor since 1997

=== Results ===
Incumbent Governor Frank O'Bannon ran unopposed for his party's nomination. He won 272,213 votes statewide and 100% of the vote.

Democratic primary results
| Party | Candidate | Votes | % |
|---|---|---|---|
| Democratic | Frank O'Bannon (incumbent) | 272,213 | 100.00 |
| Total votes | | 272,213 | 100.00 |

== Republican primary ==
=== Candidates ===
- David McIntosh, U.S. representative from Muncie
- John Price

==== Declined ====
- George Witwer, 1996 candidate for governor (endorsed McIntosh)

=== Campaign ===
McIntosh's central campaign theme was a 25% cut in property taxes, which drew ire from his opponents. McIntosh also called for replacing the ISTEP Plus standardized test and merit-based evaluations of teachers in his "Kids First" education plan, released on March 3, 2000. Price's campaign was based largely on his "Price Plan", a 70-page booklet outlining a 27-step program for running the state government.

=== Results ===
In the primary election, Price was defeated soundly by McIntosh, who won 71% of the vote.

McIntosh: 50–60%; 60–70%; 70–80%; 80–90%; Price: 50–60%

Republican primary results
| Party | Candidate | Votes | % |
|---|---|---|---|
| Republican | David M. McIntosh | 279,920 | 70.96 |
| Republican | John Price | 114,580 | 29.04 |
| Total votes | | 394,500 | 100.00 |

== General election ==
=== Candidates ===
- David McIntosh, U.S. representative from Muncie (Republican)
  - Running mate: J. Murray Clark, state senator from Indianapolis
- Frank O'Bannon, incumbent governor since 1997 (Democratic)
  - Running mate: Joe Kernan, incumbent lieutenant governor since 1997
- Andrew Horning, 1999 candidate for Indianapolis mayor (Libertarian)
  - Running mate: Mark Schreiber

=== Campaign ===
Throughout the campaign, McIntosh made his proposed 25% tax cut his signature issue. O'Bannon attacked the plan as potentially harmful to education, which was his top talking point during the fall campaign. O'Bannon unveiled a $310 million education plan on July 19 which drew scorn from both sides because of the inclusion of lottery money in the proposed funding. Despite this, O'Bannon maintained a steady lead over his opponent, with a September 1 poll showing him leading McIntosh by 21 points. This was partially credited to public distrust of McIntosh's tax policies, with polls showing "deep skepticism" of the proposed 25% cut, according to the Indianapolis Star.

=== Polling ===
| Poll source | Date(s) | Sample size | Margin of error | Frank O'Bannon (D) | David McIntosh (R) | Other / undecided (Note: Calculated by taking the difference of 100% and all other candidates combined.) |
|---|---|---|---|---|---|---|
| Harris Insights & Analytics | November 3, 2000 | 5,591 | — | 54% | 42% | 4% |
| SurveyUSA | November 2, 2000 | 500 | — | 50% | 44% | 6% |
| Rasmussen Reports | October 30, 2000 | 723 | — | 52% | 38% | 10% |
| Research 2000 | October 29, 2000 | 600 | — | 52% | 37% | 11% |
| Market Shares Corp. | October 27, 2000 | 600 | — | 49% | 33% | 18% |

=== Results ===
O'Bannon won the election with 57% of the vote. McIntosh trailed far behind at 42%, with Horning carrying just 2% of the vote.

Indiana gubernatorial election, 2000
| Party | Candidate | Votes | % |
|---|---|---|---|
| Democratic | Frank O'Bannon/Joe Kernan (incumbents) | 1,232,525 | 56.56 |
| Republican | David M. McIntosh/J. Murray Clark | 908,285 | 41.68 |
| Libertarian | Andrew Horning/Mark Schreiber | 38,458 | 1.76 |
| Total votes | | 2,179,268 | 100.0 |
| Democratic hold | | | |

==== Counties that flipped from Republican to Democratic ====
- Tippecanoe (largest city: Lafayette)
- Adams (largest city: Decatur)
- Allen (largest city: Fort Wayne)
- Bartholomew (largest city: Columbus)
- Benton (largest city: Fowler)
- Warrick (largest city: Logansport)
- Decatur (largest city: Greensburg)
- DeKalb (largest city: Auburn)
- Fountain (largest city: Attica)
- Franklin (largest city: Brookville)
- Grant (largest city: Marion)
- Hancock (largest city: Greenfield)
- Henry (largest city: New Castle)
- Howard (largest city: Kokomo)
- LaGrange (largest city: LaGrange)
- Montgomery (largest city: Crawfordsville)
- Noble (largest city: Kendallville)
- Pulaski (largest city: Winamac)
- Putnam (largest city: Greencastle)
- Rush (largest city: Rushville)
- Shelby (largest city: Shelbyville)
- Steuben (largest city: Angola)
- Tipton (largest city: Tipton)
- Union (largest city: Liberty)
- Warren (largest city: Williamsport)
- Wayne (largest city: Richmond)
- White (largest city: Monticello)
- Whitley (largest city: Columbia City)
- Dearborn (largest city: Lawrenceburg)
- Jasper (largest city: Rensselaer)
- Carroll (largest city: Delphi)
