= Corydon Democrat =

Newspaper in Corydon, Indiana, US

The Corydon Democrat
- Format: Broadsheet
- Owner: O'Bannon Publishing Company Inc.
- Founder: Simeon K. Wolfe
- Publisher: Paxton Media Group
- President: Jamie Paxton
- Editor: Morgan Jemtrud
- Founded: 1856; 169 years ago
- Political alignment: Democratic
- Language: English
- City: Corydon, Indiana, U.S.
- Country: United States of America
- Circulation: 6,250
- Readership: Corydon, IN
- OCLC number: 11010941
- Website: Newspaper website

The Corydon Democrat is a community newspaper in Corydon, Harrison County, Indiana, U.S., which has approximately 6,250 copies in circulation. It is published every Wednesday by the O’Bannon Publishing Company, and has been family-owned since 1963.

Frank O'Bannon served as the 47th Governor of Indiana and worked for the newspaper. He also served the Corydon community as chairman of the O’Bannon Publishing Company before taking the political stage.

The Battle of Corydon, the only American Civil War battle fought on Indiana soil, was reported by editor Simeon K. Wolfe in the July 14, 1863 edition of the Corydon Weekly Democrat.

The Corydon Democrat holds the historical record for the Harrison County Fair, specified by the Harrison County Fair Office. This fair has been held for over 150 years, since 1860, making it the oldest county fair in the state of Indiana to be continuously held in the same location, the Harrison County Fairgrounds.

== Awards ==
The newspaper is a sixteen-time "Blue Ribbon Award" winner in editing by the Hoosier State Press Association in the non-daily division. This award evaluates the overall editorial quality of the newspaper.

- 2015
- 2012
- 2000
- 1998
- 1996
- 1994
- 1991
- 1990
- 1989
- 1988
- 1985
- 1980
- 1979
- 1977
- 1976
- 1975
