= Midwestern Governors Association =

U.S. interstate organization

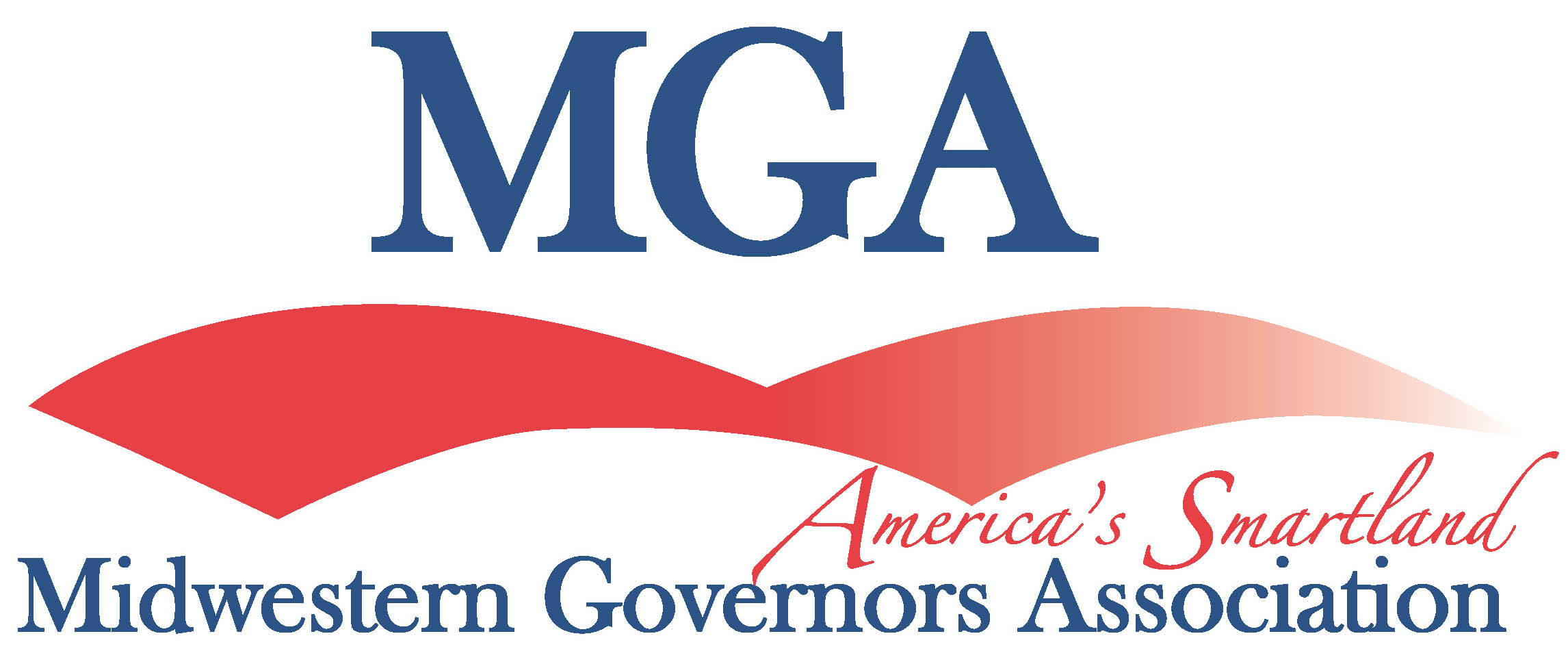

The Midwestern Governors Association (MGA) is a 501(c)(3) nonprofit, nonpartisan organization that brings together the governors of Midwestern states to work cooperatively on public policy issues of significance to the region. The MGA was created in December 1962, when articles of organization were adopted at the first annual meeting in Chicago. The members of the association are the governors of Illinois, Indiana, Iowa, Kansas, Michigan, Minnesota, Missouri, Nebraska, North Dakota, Ohio, South Dakota and Wisconsin.

The purpose of the MGA is "to foster regional development, to attain greater efficiency in state administration, to facilitate interstate cooperation and improve intergovernmental relationships, and to provide a medium for the exchange of views and experiences on subjects of general importance to the people of the Midwestern states." In pursuit of these objectives, the MGA has, through the years, established a wide array of committees, task forces and study groups charged with investigating and reporting on various issues of regional concern.

The MGA staff supports projects undertaken by the governors and by the MGA working groups to promote regional cooperation and problem-solving. These multi-state groups of government officials work to enhance economic development in the Midwestern states and identify opportunities at the federal level to advance the MGA's goals. Issues they have recently addressed include agriculture, economic development, energy, and promoting Midwestern Successes.

The MGA also has Gold and Silver business partners, corresponding to the different contribution and benefit levels.

== List of current Midwestern governors ==
The current MGA chair is Governor Mike Braun of Indiana.

Current governor	State	Past	Party	Took office	Seat up
JB Pritzker	Illinois	List	Democratic	2019	2027
Mike Braun	Indiana	List	Republican	2025	2029
Kim Reynolds	Iowa	List	Republican	2017	2027 (declined to seek re-election)
Laura Kelly	Kansas	List	Democratic	2019	2027 (term limited)
Gretchen Whitmer	Michigan	List	Democratic	2019	2027 (term limited)
Tim Walz	Minnesota	List	Democratic	2019	2027
Mike Kehoe	Missouri	List	Republican	2025	2029
Jim Pillen	Nebraska	List	Republican	2023	2027
Kelly Armstrong	North Dakota	List	Republican	2024	2028
Mike DeWine	Ohio	List	Republican	2019	2027 (term limited)
Larry Rhoden	South Dakota	List	Republican	2025	2027
Tony Evers	Wisconsin	List	Democratic	2019	2027 (declined to seek re-election)

== MGA's past leadership ==
- 2023–2024 Chair: Illinois Governor JB Pritzker
- 2021–2022 Chair: Minnesota Governor Tim Walz
- 2019–2020 Chair: Iowa Governor Kim Reynolds
- 2018 Chair: Ohio Governor John Kasich
- 2017 Chair: Wisconsin Governor Scott Walker
- 2015-2016 Chair: Kansas Governor Sam Brownback
- 2014 Chair: Wisconsin Governor Scott Walker
- 2013 Chair: Minnesota Governor Mark Dayton
- 2012 Chair: Iowa Governor Terry Branstad
- 2011 Chair: Illinois Governor Pat Quinn
- 2010 Chair: Ohio Governor Ted Strickland
- 2009 Chair: Michigan Governor Jennifer Granholm
- 2008 Chair: South Dakota Governor Michael Rounds
- 2007 Chair: Wisconsin Governor Jim Doyle
- 2006 Chair: Minnesota Governor Tim Pawlenty
