= Paul J. Robertson =

American politician

Paul Robertson

Member of the Indiana House of Representatives from the 70th district
- In office 1978–2011
- Succeeded by: Rhonda Rhoads

Personal details
- Born: April 25, 1946 (age 80)
- Party: Democratic
- Spouse: Jill Ann
- Education: Indiana State University
- Profession: Educator, retired

Paul J. Robertson was a Democratic member of the Indiana House of Representatives, representing the 70th District from 1978 to 2011. He was the Assistant Democratic Leader, Speaker Pro Tempore Emeritus. Upon the leaving of Dennie Oxley he assumed the position of Majority whip. He was also a teacher at Corydon Central High School for a number of years.
