= David McIntosh (politician) =

American politician (born 1958)

- McIntosh in 2026

Member of the U.S. House of Representatives from Indiana's 2nd district
- In office January 3, 1995 – January 3, 2001
- Preceded by: Phil Sharp
- Succeeded by: Mike Pence

Director of the Domestic Policy Council
- In office December 2, 1987 – September 8, 1988
- President: Ronald Reagan
- Preceded by: Ken Cribb
- Succeeded by: Dan Crippen

Personal details
- Born: David Martin McIntosh; June 8, 1958 (age 68) Oakland, California, U.S.
- Party: Republican
- Education: Yale University (BA); University of Chicago (JD)

David Martin McIntosh (born June 8, 1958) is an American attorney and Republican Party politician who served as the U.S. representative for Indiana's 2nd congressional district from 1995 to 2001. He is a co-founder of two conservative political groups, the Federalist Society and the Club for Growth.

McIntosh was the Republican nominee for Governor of Indiana in 2000, losing to Democratic incumbent Frank O'Bannon. He was an unsuccessful candidate for the Republican nomination in Indiana's 5th congressional district in 2012.

== Early life, education, and law career ==
McIntosh was born in Oakland, California, the son of Jean Marie (Slough), a judge, and Norman McIntosh. He moved to his mother's hometown of Kendallville, Indiana, at age five after his father died.

McIntosh attended Yale University, where he was a member and later president of the Yale Political Union and, despite his political orientation, its Progressive Party. He graduated with a B.A. (cum laude) in 1980, and later received a J.D. from University of Chicago Law School in 1983. McIntosh was taught at Chicago by Antonin Scalia, who later became a Supreme Court Justice. He is also a co-founder of the Federalist Society.

== Early political career ==
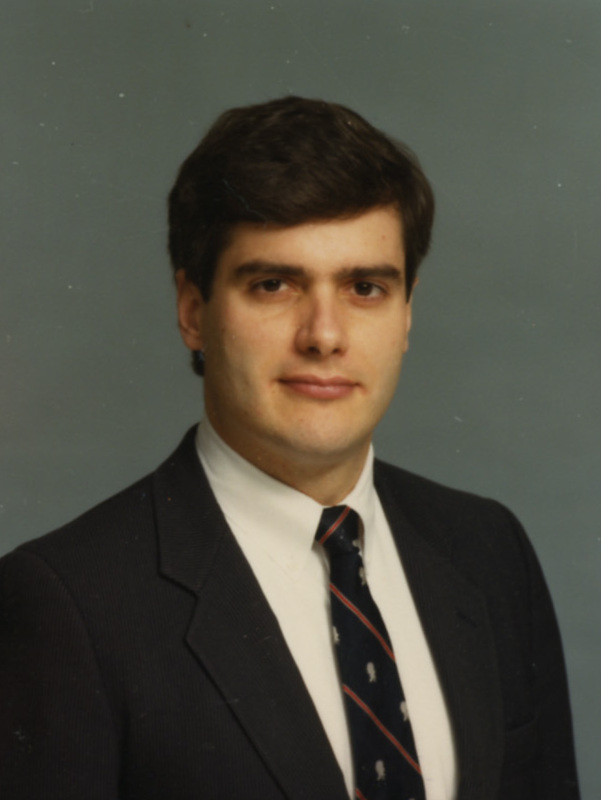
McIntosh's 1988 portrait during the Reagan administration

During the Reagan administration, McIntosh served as Special Assistant to the Attorney General and as Special Assistant to the President for Domestic Affairs.

In George H. W. Bush's administration, he served as executive director of Vice President Dan Quayle's Council for Competitiveness. In that role, he emphasized limiting or rolling back environmental regulations that the Council saw as inimical to economic growth – such as a redraft of the Clean Air Act which would allow for companies to increase pollution emissions without notifying the public.

== U.S. House of Representatives ==
=== Elections ===
1994

Incumbent Democratic U.S. Congressman Philip Sharp of Indiana's 2nd congressional district decided to retire. McIntosh decided to run and won the Republican primary with a plurality of 43% in a four candidate field. In the general election, he defeated Democratic Secretary of State of Indiana Joe Hogsett 54%–46%.

1996

He won re-election to a second term with 58% of the vote.

1998

He won re-election to a third term with 61% of the vote.

=== Tenure ===
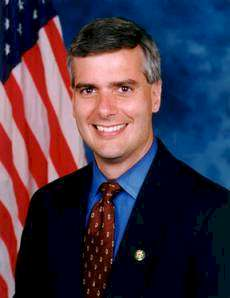
McIntosh's congressional portrait

McIntosh fought against U.S. Senator Bob Dole to get rid of regulations within the health and food industries.

After Newt Gingrich resigned as Speaker of the United States House of Representatives, McIntosh thought about running himself. He decided not to run and endorsed William Reynolds Archer, Jr.

=== Committee assignments ===
He was a member of the House Oversight and Government Reform Committee and was Chairman of the House Oversight and Reform subcommittee.

== 2000 gubernatorial election ==
In 2000, McIntosh ran for Governor of Indiana, but lost to incumbent Democrat Frank O'Bannon, 57 percent to 42 percent. His campaign was built around a 25 percent guaranteed property tax cut, but he never provided details on how he would accomplish it.

== Post-congressional career ==
Since 2001, McIntosh has been a partner in the global law firm of Mayer Brown. In 2009, he served as a political advisor to conservative lobby groups on Sonia Sotomayor's nomination to the Supreme Court.

=== 2004 gubernatorial election ===
He planned another run for governor in 2004, but dropped out before the Indiana Republican primary after struggling to gain support in anticipation that President George W. Bush would support Mitch Daniels, former Director of the White House Office of Management and Budget.

=== 2012 congressional election ===
In 2012 McIntosh announced his candidacy for Congress, running in the newly redrawn 5th Congressional district, held by retiring Republican Dan Burton. He was narrowly defeated in the primary by former U.S. Attorney Susan Brooks, losing to her by 1,010 votes out of over 100,000 votes cast.

=== Club for Growth ===
McIntosh presenting Congressman Michael Baumgartner with the Defender for Economic Freedom Award

In December 2014, McIntosh was named the head of the Club for Growth. On November 7, 2020, on behalf of the Club for Growth, McIntosh was a signatory to a message communicated by Sen. Mike Lee to White House Chief of Staff, Mark Meadows, expressing unequivocal support for Donald Trump following his loss in the 2020 election to Joe Biden and urging President Trump "to exhaust every legal and constitutional remedy at [his] disposal to restore Americans faith in our elections."

== Electoral history ==
Indiana's 2nd congressional district: Results 1994–1998
Year	Democratic	Votes	Pct	Republican	Votes	Pct	3rd Party	Party	Votes	Pct
1994	Joe Hogsett	78,241	46%	David M. McIntosh	93,592	54%				
1996	Marc Carmichael	85,105	40%	David M. McIntosh	123,113	58%	Paul E. Zimmerman	Libertarian	4,665	2%
1998	Sherman A. Boles	62,452	38%	David M. McIntosh	99,608	61%	Cliff Federle	Libertarian	2,236	1%

Governor of Indiana: Results 2000
Year	Democratic	Votes	Pct	Republican	Votes	Pct	3rd Party	Party	Votes	Pct
2000	Frank O'Bannon	1,232,525	57%	David M. McIntosh	908,285	42%	Andrew Horning	Libertarian	38,458	2%

Political offices
Preceded by Ken Cribb	Director of the Domestic Policy Council; 1987–1988	Succeeded by Dan Crippen
U.S. House of Representatives
Preceded by Phil Sharp	Member of the U.S. House of Representatives from Indiana's 2nd congressional district 1995–2001	Succeeded by Mike Pence
Party political offices
Preceded by Dan Burton; John Doolittle; Ernest Istook; Sam Johnson	Chair of the Republican Study Committee; 1999–2000	Succeeded by Sam Johnson
Preceded by Steve Goldsmith	Republican nominee for Governor of Indiana; 2000	Succeeded by Mitch Daniels
Non-profit organization positions
Preceded by Chris Chocola	President of the Club for Growth; 2015–present	Incumbent
U.S. order of precedence (ceremonial)
Preceded by Jill Long Thompson as Former U.S. Representative	Order of precedence of the United States as Former U.S. Representative	Succeeded by Luke Messer as Former U.S. Representative
