= 2023 Gary, Indiana, mayoral election =

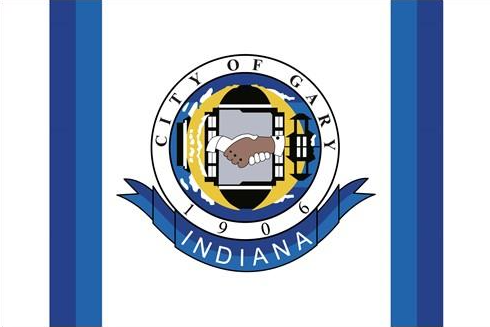
- November 7, 2023
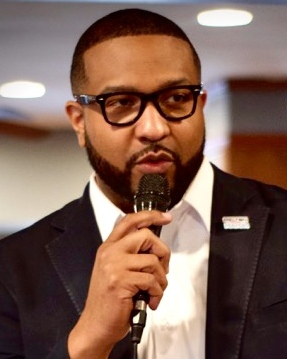

Nominee	Eddie Melton	Andrew Delano
Party	Democratic	Republican
Popular vote	6,373	314
Percentage	95.1%	4.7%
Mayor before election
Jerome Prince
Democratic
Elected mayor
Eddie Melton
Democratic

The 2023 Gary, Indiana, mayoral election was held on November 7, 2023, to elect the mayor of Gary, Indiana. Primary elections were held on May 2. Incumbent mayor Jerome Prince ran for re-election to a second term in office, but lost the Democratic primary to state senator Eddie Melton. This election marked the first time in the history of Gary, Indiana, that a one-term mayor was defeated in a reelection bid. Melton defeated Republican nominee Andrew Delano in the general election.

== Background ==
Mayoral elections in Gary, Indiana, are partisan. Mayors serve four-year terms, with no term limits. Incumbent mayor Jerome Prince was first elected after defeating two-term mayor Karen Freeman-Wilson in 2019. Prince had been criticized in his first term for the lack of a permanent police chief. His challenger, state senator Eddie Melton, had also criticized him for his "abortive attempt" to sell the Genesis Convention Center to a company that later defaulted and was sued by the city.

In late January 2023, Prince announced his reelection bid, with Melton and truck driver Danien Walls as his primary opponents. In February 2023, Lake County Democratic Party chair Jim Wieser announced he would be seeking to remove Walls from the ballot, on the grounds that Walls "had no history of having voted as a Democrat." In Indiana, in order to appear on a major party's primary ballot, a candidate must have requested for the primary ballot of that party and voted in that party's two prior primary elections, or obtain a waiver from the county party chair. As Walls had not met either condition, the board upheld Wieser's challenge and removed Walls from the ballot.

In April 2023, Howey Politics Indiana rated the Democratic primary race as a toss-up. Melton defeated Prince in the primary. This election marked the first time in the history of Gary, Indiana, that a one-term mayor was defeated in a reelection bid, and it also marked the second election in a row where an incumbent mayor was defeated by a challenger.

The population of Gary had fallen by 61% from its peak in the 1960s down to only 66,583 residents as of December 2022. Owing to the downward trend in population, the Democratic primary tally of 10,790 votes was 4,000 fewer votes than the Democratic primary in the 2019 mayoral race.

== Democratic primary ==
=== Candidates ===
==== Nominee ====
- Eddie Melton, state senator from the 3rd district since 2016

==== Eliminated in the primary ====
- Jerome Prince, incumbent mayor since 2020

==== Disqualified ====
- Danien Walls, truck driver

=== Endorsements ===
Eddie Melton

State legislators

- Earline Rogers, former state senator from the 3rd district (1990–2016)

Individuals

- Jackie Jackson, musician from The Jackson 5
- Marlon Jackson, dancer and musician from The Jackson 5
- Tito Jackson, musician from The Jackson 5
- Deniece Williams, singer

Newspapers and other media

- Gary Crusader

Labor unions

- Fraternal Order of Police Lodge 61
- Gary Teachers Union (AFT Local 4)
- Indiana/Kentucky/Ohio Regional Council of Carpenters
- International Association of Fire Fighters Local 359
- Northwest Indiana Association of Realtors
- UNITE HERE Local 1
- United Steelworkers Local 7 and Local 1066
Jerome Prince

Labor unions

- International Union of Operating Engineers Local 150
- International Brotherhood of Teamsters Local 142
- Northwest Indiana Building and Construction Trades Council
- United Steelworkers Local 1014

==== Results ====
Democratic primary for the 2023 Gary, Indiana, mayoral election
Party	Candidate	Votes	%
Democratic	Eddie Melton	6,345	58.87
Democratic	Jerome Prince (incumbent)	4,438	41.13
Total votes		10,790	100.00

== Republican primary ==
=== Nominee ===
- Andrew Delano

==== Results ====
Republican primary for the 2023 Gary, Indiana, mayoral election
Party	Candidate	Votes	%
Republican	Andrew Delano	192	100.00
Total votes		192	100.00

== General election ==
=== Results ===
2023 Gary mayoral election
Party	Candidate	Votes	%	±%
Democratic	Eddie Melton	6,373	95.09%	−4.42
Republican	Andrew Delano	314	4.69%	N/A
Write-in		15	0.22%	−0.27
Total votes		6,702	100.00%	
Democratic hold				
