= Genesis Convention Center =

Former convention center and arena in Gary, Indiana, U.S.

Coordinates: 41°36′9″N 87°20′19″W

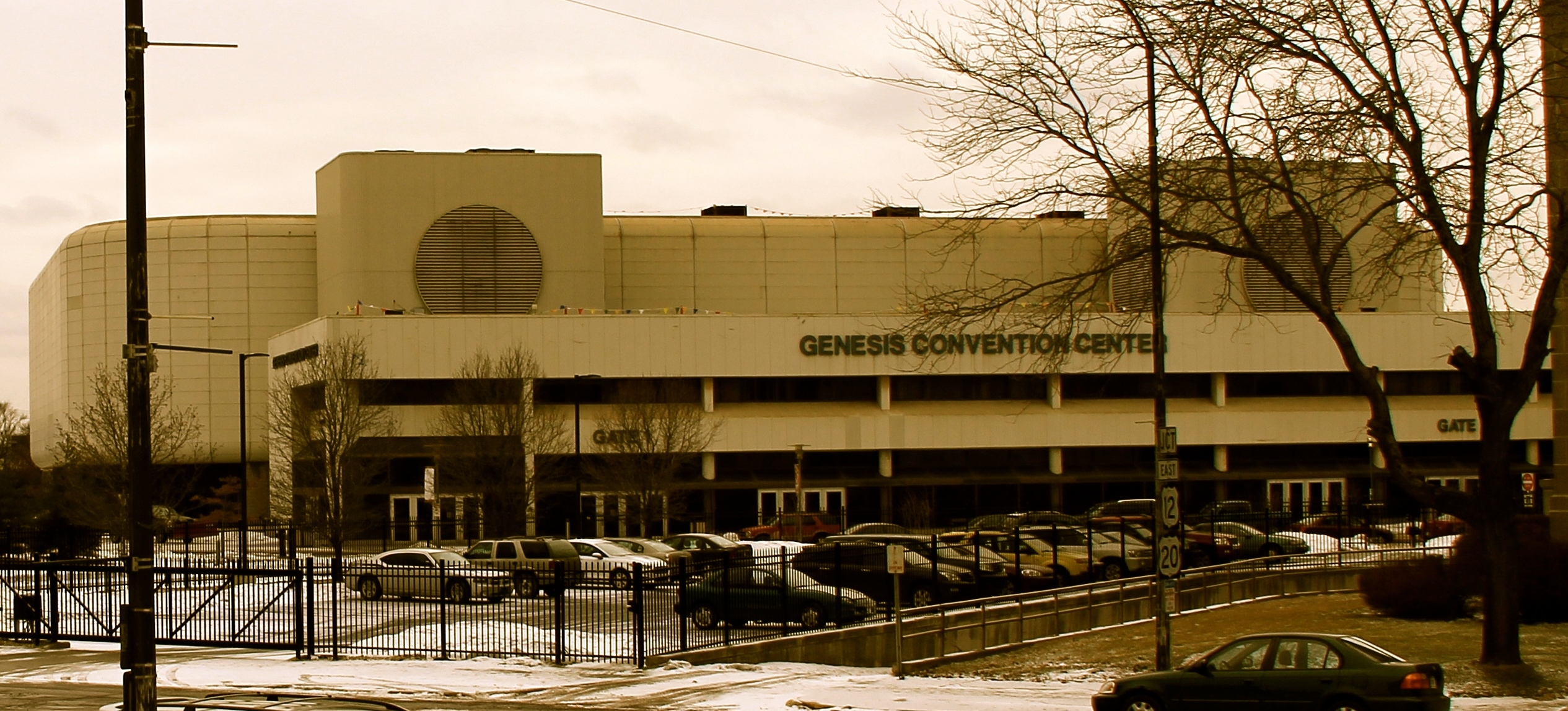
- Interactive map of Genesis Convention Center
- Address: 1 Genesis Center Plaza; Gary, Indiana; United States
- Location: 1 Genesis Center Plaza Gary, Indiana
- Owner: City of Gary
- Operator: Gary, Indiana
- Capacity: 6,500 (basketball); 7,000 (multi-purpose)

Construction
- Built: 1981
- Opened: 1981
- Closed: 2020
- Architect: Wendell Campbell

Tenants
- Gary Steelheads (IBL/CBA/USBL/IBL) (2000–2008); Gary Splash (IBA) (2010–2013)

The Genesis Convention Center was a multi-purpose arena and convention center in downtown Gary, Indiana, United States which has been closed since 2020. Opened in 1981, it features a 24,472 sq ft arena floor with a 49 ft ceiling and the attached "Indiana Hall," a combined theater/ballroom seating about 1,200. It is designed to host up to 7,000 people. It served as a key venue for sporting, cultural, and civic events. It is scheduled for demolition in 2026.

== History ==
Built by the city and designed by Wendell Campbell, the center opened in 1981. It served as a civic, entertainment, and sports hub for Gary and Northwest Indiana. Part of its purpose was to revitalize Gary's economy, which had collapsed following the decline of the steel industry.

In 2018, then-mayor Karen Freeman-Wilson described the building as a "drain" of the city of Gary, and sought a buyer, advising that demolition would be too expensive. On March 20 of that year, the Gary Common Council voted unanimously to establish an ordinance that would legally vacate Washington Street between 4th and 5th avenues, after discovering that the streets that run underneath the Genesis were never legally vacated when the structure was built in 1981.

By the 2010s the facility had deteriorated.

In October 2020, Akyumen said it would invest $100 million in a project to obtain the Convention Center (and Ivanhoe Gardens properties), where Akyumen had planned to establish its new headquarters and 5G smartphone manufacturing facility. However, this deal did not work out, and ultimately the City of Gary's Redevelopment Commission was obliged to pay $35,000 to have the properties transferred back to the city

In 2024, Mayor Melton indicated his desire to demolish the center's parking garage, closed for years due to structural issues - but not the Genesis Center itself, saying "It has served as a cornerstone in our community, from basketball games to graduations to weddings and banquets.. That's something that we need to bring back." Powers & Sons Construction had begun an assessment on the structure, to try to find a way to reopen it.

In June 2025, the mayor of Gary, Eddie Melton issued a press release seeking interest for the future of the Genesis Convention Center, located in the heart of downtown. The city, it says, are seeking developers, design firms and community-driven organizations to "bring forward ideas to transform the Genesis Center into a multiuse facility that supports the city’s economic growth and honors its historic legacy." The city is also open to proposals for the redevelopment of the site if the building is to be demolished.

As of 2026, it is officially closed and remains unused, suffering neglect and vandalism.

It is scheduled for demolition in 2026.

== Sports teams ==
- The Gary Steelheads (IBL/CBA/USBL/IBL) played from 2000 to 2008 at the arena.
- The Gary Splash (Independent Basketball Association) used it from 2010 until 2013.

== Notable events ==
The center hosted a wide range of major events:

- Miss USA pageant in 2001 and 2002.
- World Wrestling Federation (WWF) house shows, including a February 27, 1988 card featuring stars like Randy Savage, The Iron Sheik, Bret Hart, and others.
- Concerts by Prince, Whitney Houston, Ludacris, Public Enemy, L.L. Cool J, The 2 Live Crew, Three 6 Mafia, Candyman, and Too $hort. The final concert before closure was a performance by rapper Gucci Mane on October 30, 2020.
- Cultural events such as high school graduations, funerals, conventions, and concerts, including the funeral of former mayors Rudy Clay and Richard G. Hatcher
