= Thomas McDermott Jr. =

American politician (born 1969)

Tom McDermott
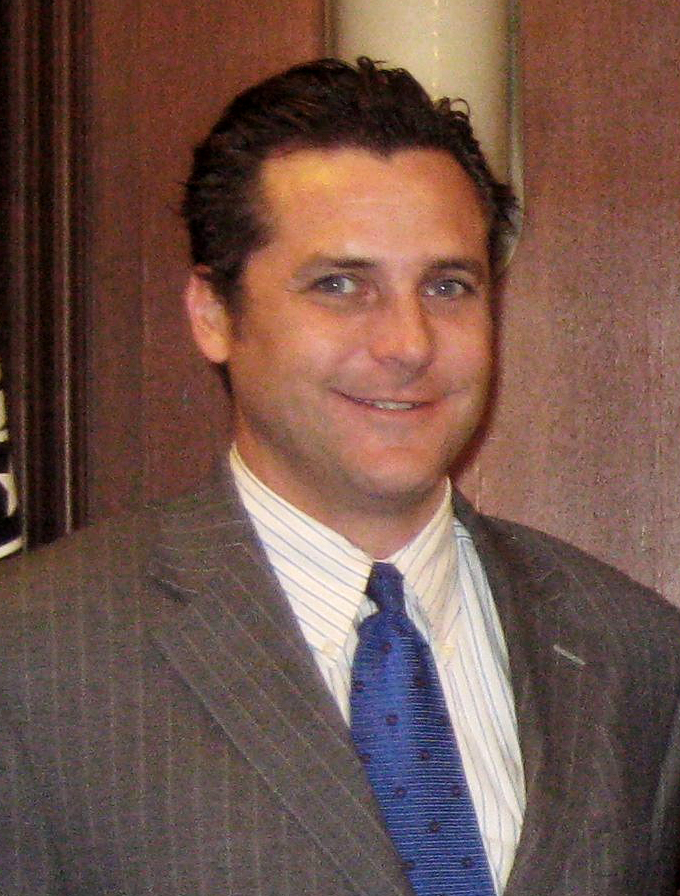

20th Mayor of Hammond
- Incumbent
- Assumed office January 1, 2004
- Preceded by: Duane Dedelow

Personal details
- Born: Thomas Matthew McDermott Jr. March 4, 1969 (age 57) Logan, Utah, U.S.
- Party: Democratic (since 2002) Republican (before 2002)
- Spouse(s): Starla Pettus (divorced); Marissa Kelly (1999–present)
- Children: 4
- Education: Purdue University Northwest (BS); University of Notre Dame (JD)
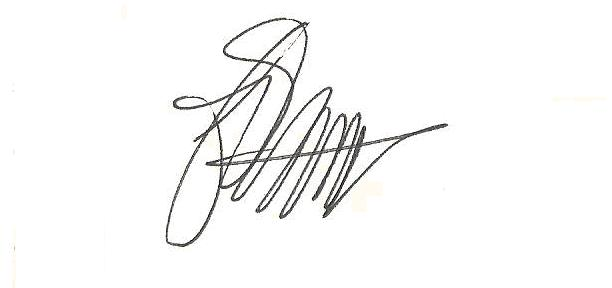
- Signature
- Website: Campaign website

Military service
- Allegiance: United States
- Branch/service: United States Navy
- Years of service: 1988–1994
- Rank: Petty Officer Second Class
- Unit: USS Hyman G. Rickover
- Battles/wars: Gulf War

Thomas Matthew McDermott Jr. (born March 4, 1969) is an American attorney and politician from the state of Indiana serving as the 20th mayor of Hammond, Indiana. He took office on January 1, 2004, the first elected government office he has held. He is a member of the Democratic Party. After winning the general election in November 2015 for a fourth term, McDermott became the longest-serving mayor in Hammond's history. He was elected to a sixth term in 2023.

== Early life and education ==
McDermott was born March 4, 1969, in Logan, Utah to Thomas M. McDermott Sr. and Susan Bobinski, both from California. McDermott's father, Thomas McDermott Sr., was a Republican who served as the 18th mayor of Hammond from 1984 through 1992. McDermott was raised by his mother in Northern California's Napa Valley and spent summers with his father in Indiana.

After graduating from Napa High School in Napa, California in 1987, McDermott joined the United States Navy. During his six years in uniform, he was assigned as a nuclear submariner aboard USS Hyman G. Rickover, and he served on Rickover during the Gulf War. He later served as a nuclear electrician in the sub's reactor plant, and also passed the qualification course to become Rickover's only diver.

After his navy service, McDermott moved to Northwest Indiana, where he worked as a supervisor at a local power plant while attending Purdue University Northwest. He received a Bachelor of Science degree in finance in 1996, then attended Notre Dame Law School, from which he received a Juris Doctor in 2000. After attaining admission to the bar, McDermott practiced law in Hammond.

== Career ==
McDermott won the 2003 mayoral election for Hammond by defeating incumbent Republican mayor Duane Dedelow 52.1% – 47.9%, a margin of just 700 votes. During McDermott's first term in office, the dilapidated River Park Apartment complex was razed under the guidance of the Hammond Redevelopment Commission. Mayor McDermott's father, Tom McDermott Sr., helped attract Cabela's outdoor recreation retail store to the former Woodmar Country Club site in south Hammond in 2005. Critics at the time referred to the generous tax abatement awarded Cabela's as "corporate welfare" while supporters, including the mayor, cited a "public-private partnership."

McDermott advocated for the elimination of the Hammond Health Department in 2004, in 2005, and finally succeeding in September 2007. According to McDermott, this department was an example of duplicate government better left to the county to operate, while mayoral detractors claimed it was a valuable and much-needed service to the city, especially its poorest citizens. McDermott was re-elected in the 2007 mayoral race 52.4% – 47.6%, a margin of just 400 votes over Republican nominee George Janiec.

On March 28, 2008, McDermott endorsed Senator Hillary Clinton for president and hosted a rally for the senator at the Hammond Civic center. McDermott later joined her campaign at a restaurant in Crown Point. Clinton's arrival in Hammond was the first visit of any presidential political candidate since Ronald Reagan visited Hammond (Hessville Park) in 1976, and Robert F. Kennedy in 1968. During the Democratic presidential primaries in Indiana, McDermott was seen on CNN questioning Gary, Indiana mayor, Rudy Clay about votes that had not yet been posted many hours after the polls had closed. This "mayor fight" was satirized the following day on The Daily Show with Jon Stewart. He also criticized the busing of high school students to voting booths saying "These kids come from the worst performing schools in the state of Indiana and we are giving them a day off to go vote for Obama. They can vote on election day like everybody else."

In November 2009, McDermott protested the arrest of his close associate David Woerpel, a postal worker, precinct captain and political commentator, after Indiana state police said they spotted marijuana growing in Woerpel's backyard. Charges of "possession of marijuana and maintaining a common nuisance" were later dropped and McDermott accused his political rival, Lake County Sheriff Rogelio "Roy" Dominguez, of "playing politics by targeting Woerpel."

McDermott was mentioned as a potential candidate in the 2010 United States Senate election in Indiana to succeed the retiring Evan Bayh, but dropped out, and endorsed fellow candidate Brad Ellsworth.

In 2011, McDermott won election for the third time, winning the Democratic primary with 68% of the vote and the general election in November with 80.2% of the vote in a rematch of his 2007 opponent George Janiec, a margin of 7,200 votes.

In February 2014, McDermott agreed to the $200,000 settlement of a discrimination complaint filed by Hammond Housing Authority Director Maria Becerra. An editorial in The Times of Northwest Indiana later called for McDermott to make a public apology in the wake of Becerra's ouster from the Hammond Housing Authority.

On May 16, 2014, McDermott announced that he would step down as the chairman of the Lake County Democratic Party. It was speculated that McDermott planned on running for governor of Indiana in the 2016 election. On May 5, 2015, McDermott became the first mayor in Hammond's history to win four consecutive democratic primaries when he handily beat 6th District Councilman Homero "Chico" Hinojosa with 78% of the vote. On November 3, 2015, McDermott won the general election by a landslide margin of 87% to 13% over Republican Humberto Prado, a margin of 5,100 votes, becoming the longest-serving mayor in Hammond's history.

In 2015, complaints were dismissed by the Lake County, Indiana election board that McDermott allegedly violated finance laws for not properly itemizing over $200,000 in reimbursements for food, lodging, and rental cars. In November 2019, McDermott publicly admitted that he had been fined $50,000 for improper campaign loans from his wife Lake Circuit Judge Marissa McDermott.

Following Pete Visclosky's decision not to seek reelection to the United States House of Representatives for Indiana's 1st congressional district in the 2020 election, McDermott declared his candidacy for his seat. McDermott finished in second place in the primary election behind Frank J. Mrvan.

In 2021, McDermott filed with the Federal Election Commission to allow him to raise money for a potential challenge to Todd Young in the 2022 United States Senate election in Indiana. McDermott won the Democratic nomination for this seat unopposed. On October 16, 2022, McDermott participated in a live televised debate with Incumbent Republican Senator Todd Young, and Libertarian candidate James Sceniak. On election night November 8, 2022, McDermott conceded his senate campaign to Republican Todd Young. The final results of the election gave McDermott about 701,988 votes, or 37.9% of the state's total U.S. senate vote.

== Personal life ==
McDermott has been married twice. His first wife was Starla (Pettus) McDermott, with whom he is the father of two children, Lindsey and Chase. They later divorced, and in 1999, McDermott married Marissa J. Kelly, whom he met while they were attending law school. They are the parents of two children, Tommy, and Patrick. Marissa is a Lake County judge, attorney, and Hammond precinct committeewoman. She was born in Warsaw, Poland and grew up on Long Island.

Political offices
Preceded by Duane Dedelow	Mayor of Hammond; 2004–present	Incumbent
Party political offices
Preceded by Evan Bayh	Democratic nominee for U.S. Senator from Indiana (Class 3); 2022	Most recent
