= Pickwick Club collapse =

1925 building collapse in Boston

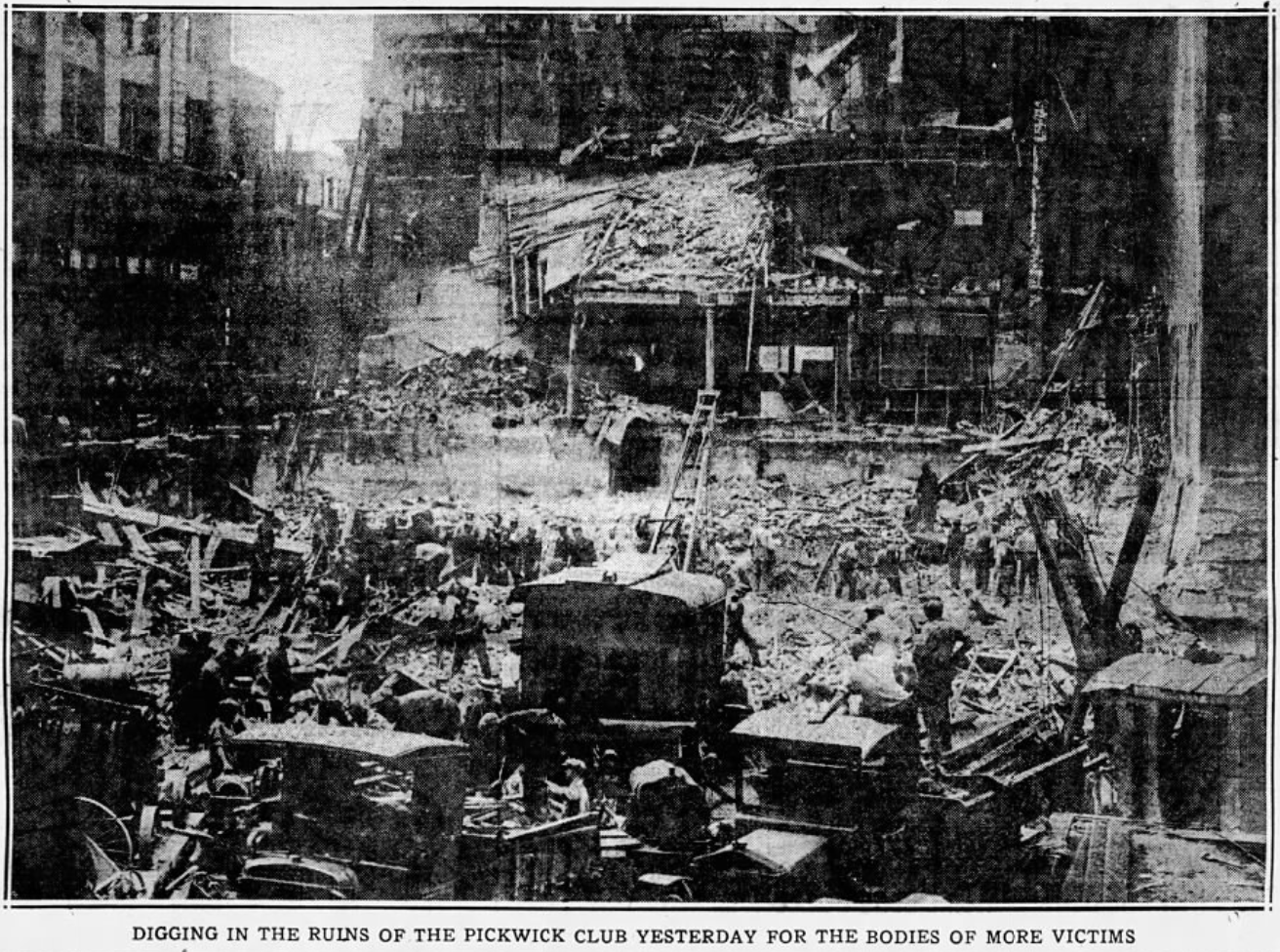
- Photo of the site, as published in The Boston Globe
- Date: July 4, 1925 (101 years ago)
- Time: Around 3:30 a.m.
- Location: Pickwick Club 6 Beach Street Boston, Massachusetts, U.S.; 42°21′05″N 71°03′43″W
- Deaths: 44
- Accused: 12
- Charges: Manslaughter and maintaining a common nuisance
- Verdict: Not guilty

The Pickwick Club collapse occurred in Boston, Massachusetts, U.S., in the early morning hours of July 4, 1925. It killed 44 people, making it the deadliest building collapse in Boston's history and the second-deadliest accident in Boston (behind the Summer Street Bridge disaster) at that time. A subsequent grand jury investigation resulted in criminal charges against 12 men, but all were found not guilty at trial.

== Background ==
The Pickwick Club was located in the former Hotel Dreyfus on Beach Street in downtown Boston. The building was owned by the estate of Arthur R. Rosenthal and managed by Nathan Ginsburg. Ginsburg leased the property to the Schulte Company, which sublet it to Hyman Bloomberg who in turn sublet part of it to the Barry brothers, who ran the Pickwick Club.

The Pickwick Club opened in December 1924 and was managed by Timothy and Daniel Barry. During its first months of operation, the club was located on the first floor, the site of the former Cafe Dreyfus. In March 1925, it moved to the second floor to make room for Greenwich Village Club, a cafe that closed after a couple of months. The Pickwick Club closed for a couple of weeks following an April 13, 1925 fire that occurred in another part of the building. Fire chief Daniel F. Sennott believed that the building was not badly damaged, and building inspector James J. Hendrick declared the building to be safe.

Timothy Barry had connections to the city's political, newspaper, and legal circles, however the club instead attracted a seedy crowd and gained a reputation as a social center for members of the criminal underworld. The club attempted to remove the criminal element by only allowing those with membership cards to enter; however, the management's leniency in issuing cards created the opposite effect. During its brief history, the club was the site of a stabbing and more than one liquor raid (prohibition in the United States spanned 1920–1933). Although there was reportedly liquor on the premises, there were no charges ever made against management.

== Collapse ==
On July 3, 1925, the club hosted about 200 patrons for a before-the-Fourth dance. The event was to last until 4 am the following day. Around 3:30 am, there were about 50 to 60 couples dancing when the ceiling above the dance floor collapsed.

After the ceiling fell, a wall collapsed and destroyed the entire interior of the building. Those who remained on the dance floor were then thrown down to the ground floor. Some patrons were able to escape through windows, down ladders raised by members of the Boston Fire Department (BFD), or through the next building. Members of the BFD and the Boston Police Department (BPD), as well as ambulances from the Boston City Hospital, Haymarket Relief Hospital, and the BPD quickly rushed to the scene.

Emergency personnel reported that all but the first floor had collapsed and estimated that over 40 people were trapped under debris. All of the bodies were removed by 12:30 pm on July 6 and the death toll was established at 43. On July 9, an additional victim died in the hospital, which brought the final death toll to 44.

== Possible causes ==
The disaster was initially linked with patrons of the club dancing the Charleston, with assertions that the dance "causes vibrations which give the stamping heels of an average couple the destructive force of a giant twenty times their weight." Boston's building commissioner was asked to investigate the effect of the dance on structures. Reportedly, some cities banned the Charleston.

Other factors considered as possible causes of the collapse were damage to the building during the April fire; and lack of stability caused by the prior removal of an adjoining building, weakening what had been a shared party wall.

== Legal proceedings ==
The grand jury investigation began on July 6, 1925. After 70 hours of deliberation during which 86 witnesses were called, the grand jury indicted nine men for manslaughter, three for manslaughter and maintaining a common nuisance (manufacturing or distributing alcohol in an illegal manner at a location), and one for maintaining a common nuisance. Those indicted were:

- James J. Hendrick, city building inspector (manslaughter).
- Edward W. Roemer, supervisor of construction for the city building department (manslaughter).
- John L. Pultz, contractor for a garage being constructed on an adjacent lot (manslaughter).
- John M. Tobin, Pultz's superintendent (manslaughter).
- Lawrence L. Perkins, Pultz's foreman (manslaughter).
- Harry M. Haven, architect who drew up the plans for the garage to be erected on the adjoining lot (manslaughter).
- Nathan Fritz, contractor who made repairs on the club building after the fire (manslaughter).
- George C. Funk, architect of the repair job (manslaughter).
- Timothy J. Barry, alleged proprietor of the Pickwick club (manslaughter and maintaining a common nuisance).
- Daniel Barry, Timothy Barry's brother and alleged treasurer of the club (maintaining a common nuisance).
- Nathan Ginsburg, co-administrator of the estate of Arthur R. Rosenthal, which owned the building (maintaining a common nuisance).
- Hyman Bloomberg, sublessee of the property where the club was located (manslaughter and maintaining a common nuisance).

All 12 defendants were tried together. Judge Henry T. Lummus presided over the trial. Assistant district attorney George Alpert was the lead prosecutor. Joseph F. O'Connell, Daniel J. Gallagher, Francis Murray, Albert W. Hurwitz, John P. Feeney, Elisha Greenhood, Thomas N. Creed, and Charles Fay represented the defendants.

Guy C. Emerson, an engineer asked by Suffolk County District Attorney Thomas C. O'Brien to investigate the cause of the collapse, testified that the building fell "due to a failure of the concrete piers under the foundation" and "due to a lack of lateral bracing on their easterly side". The prosecution had a second engineer, John O. DeWolf, who concurred with Emerson's findings and stated that the lack of bracing to the wall caused the collapse.

George Washington Goethals, an engineer best known for supervising the construction of the Panama Canal, testified for Hendrick. According to Goethals, the cause of the collapse was the failure of Pier 2 to support the load it was supposed to bear, calling it "the rottenest piece of concrete I ever saw". He contended that lateral bracing would not have prevented the collapse. Edwin K. MacNutt, a chemist at the Watertown Arsenal, testified that analysis of the concrete in Pier 2 showed no bonding between the cement and gravel, which would render the pier unable to hold its load. This would in turn bring extra weight on the other piers and bring down the wall.

On August 7, 1925, Judge Lummus ordered a directed verdict of not guilty for 10 of the 12 defendants. The trial ended on August 12, 1925, and after a half-hour of deliberation, the two remaining defendants, Hendrick and Perkins, were found not guilty. Following the verdict, Lummus stated that he concurred with the jury and "there never was sufficient evidence that these defendants had been willfully, recklessly or wantonly negligent”.

== See also ==
- List of disasters in Massachusetts by death toll
