= 2022 United States Senate election in Indiana =

- November 8, 2022
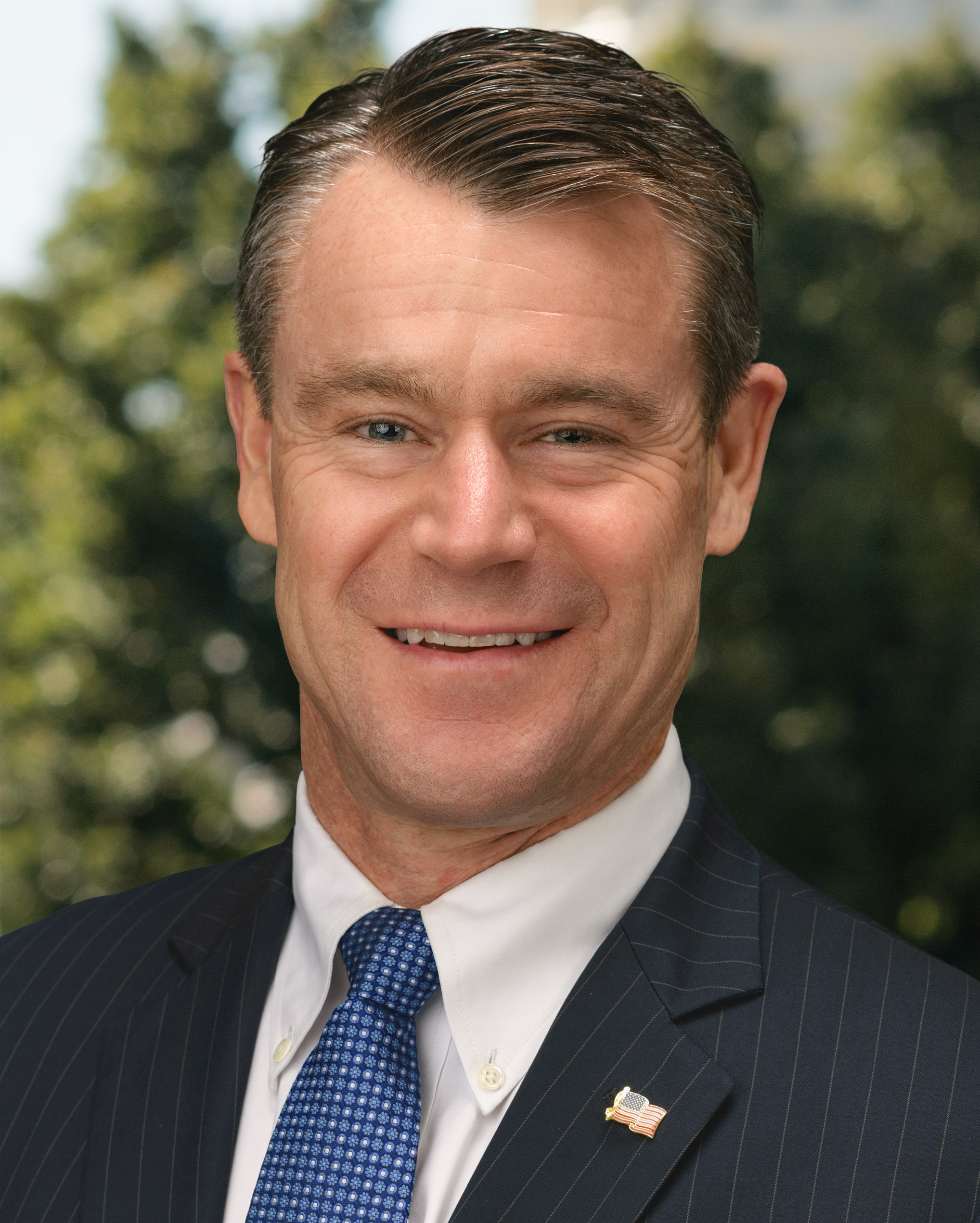

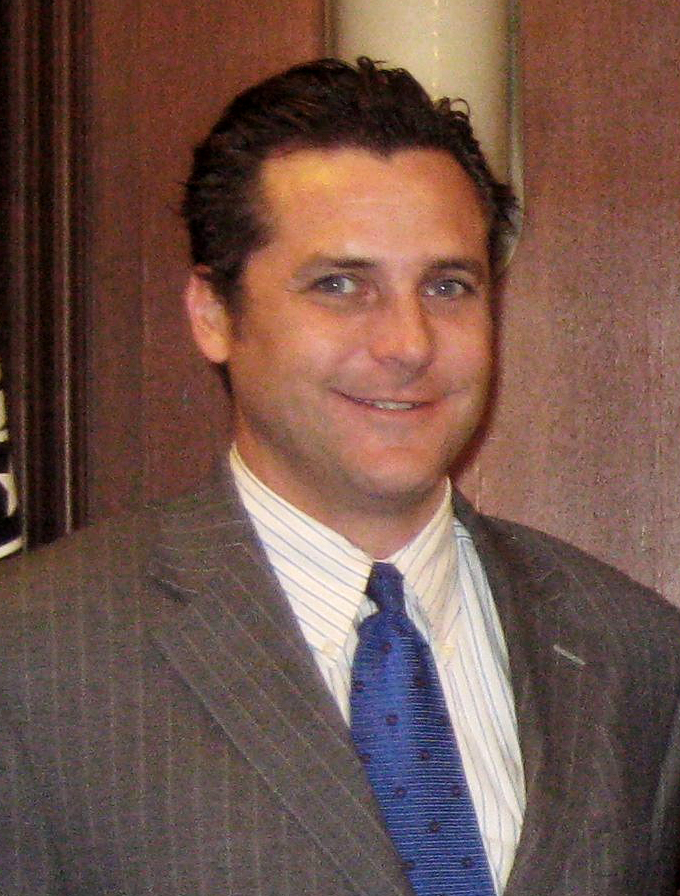
Nominee	Todd Young	Thomas McDermott Jr.
Party	Republican	Democratic
Popular vote	1,090,165	704,411
Percentage	58.62%	37.87%
- Young: 50–60% 60–70% 70–80% 80–90% McDermott: 50–60% 60–70%
U.S. senator before election
Todd Young
Republican
Elected U.S. Senator
Todd Young
Republican

The 2022 United States Senate election in Indiana was held on November 8, 2022, to elect a member of the United States Senate to represent the state of Indiana. Incumbent Senator Todd Young won a second term.

Young announced on March 2, 2021, that he would be running for a second term. He was first elected to the Senate in 2016 with 52.1% of the vote, succeeding retiring fellow Republican Dan Coats. Hammond Mayor Thomas McDermott Jr. ran for the Democratic nomination. Both ran unopposed and won their respective primaries on May 3, 2022. This was the first election since 1986 for Indiana's Class 3 U.S. Senate seat where neither Dan Coats nor Evan Bayh were on the ballot.

== Republican primary ==
=== Candidates ===
==== Nominee ====
- Todd Young, incumbent U.S. Senator

==== Removed from ballot ====
- Danny Niederberger, operations analyst and candidate for Indiana's 5th congressional district in 2020

=== Results ===
Republican primary results
Party	Candidate	Votes	%
Republican	Todd Young (incumbent)	372,738	100.0%
Total votes		372,738	100.0%

== Democratic primary ==
=== Candidates ===
==== Nominee ====
- Thomas McDermott Jr., mayor of Hammond and candidate for Indiana's 1st congressional district in 2020

==== Removed from ballot ====
- Haneefah Khaaliq, professor at Indiana University (ran as independent)
- Valerie McCray, psychologist

On February 18, 2022, the Indiana Election Commission removed Democratic candidates Haneefah Khaaliq and Valerie McCray, as well as Republican candidate Danny Niederberger, from the primary ballot. On February 4, 2022, McDermott campaign adviser Kevin Smith said the campaign would look closely at whether Khaaliq and McCray met the ballot requirements, and that avoiding a primary challenge could benefit McDermott as he entered this year with about $50,000 in campaign cash. Khaaliq then conducted an investigation and discovered that the individual who filed the challenge against both her and McCray was Scott Yahne, an attorney who was a close friend and ally of McDermott.

As a result of the findings, Khaaliq filed a lawsuit against the Indiana Election Commission and announced her decision to proceed as a write-in candidate in the 2022 general election. Khaaliq was the first African American to run for the U.S. Senate in a general election in Indiana's history.

==== Declined ====
- Pete Buttigieg, U.S. Secretary of Transportation, former mayor of South Bend, nominee for Indiana State Treasurer in 2010, and candidate for President of the United States in 2020
- Joe Donnelly, former U.S. Ambassador to the Holy See and former U.S. Senator
- J. D. Ford, state senator (ran for re-election)
- Joe Hogsett, Mayor of Indianapolis, former Indiana Secretary of State, former U.S. Attorney for the Southern District of Indiana, former chair of the Indiana Democratic Party, and nominee for U.S. Senate in 1992

=== Results ===
Democratic primary results
Party	Candidate	Votes	%
Democratic	Thomas McDermott Jr.	173,466	100.0%
Total votes		173,466	100.0%

== Libertarian convention ==
=== Candidates ===
==== Nominee ====
- James Sceniak, activist and behavior therapist

==== Eliminated at convention ====
- William Henry, U.S. Army veteran

== Write-ins ==
=== Candidates ===
==== Declared ====
- Antonio Xavier Alvarez
- Thomas Baer
- Phillip Beachy
- Haneefah Khaaliq, professor at Indiana University
- Danny Niederberger
- David G. Storer

==== Withdrew/disqualified ====
- Ellen Kizik, retail worker

== General election ==
Incumbent Senator Todd Young sought re-election in 2022. In 2016, Young was initially perceived as the underdog when Former Senator Evan Bayh was chosen to replace Representative Baron Hill. Bayh, an Indiana political giant, was considered the frontrunner until he faced criticism for many of his post-senatorial activities, allowing Young to gain momentum and secure a decisive victory.

In March 2021, Young announced he would seek a second term.

Young's main opponent in the election was Thomas McDermott Jr., the longtime mayor of Hammond, Indiana. McDermott ran as a moderate, criticizing Young for his ties to the Republican establishment and emphasizing his pro-choice stance in light of the Dobbs v. Jackson Supreme Court decision. Young, on the other hand, focused on issues like inflation and border security, directing most of his attacks at President Joe Biden rather than McDermott. While early polls indicated a close race, a poll conducted around Election Day showed Young with a comfortable lead.

On October 16, three weeks before the election, the only debate was held which featured Young, McDermott, and Libertarian Nominee James Sceniak. The Debate centered on a number of issues, including The Economy, Immigration/Border security, and Climate change, among others. Young, mainly focused on Immigration, while avoiding attacking his opponents, McDermott attacked Young relentlessly throughout the debate, even stating “When Senator Young supports spending, it is good inflation, but when he doesn't support it, that is bad inflation. The chips act is a spending bill. Todd Young helped to add to our nation inflation problem”.

Young went on to win the election easily, outperforming his 2016 performance by 11 points and receiving nearly 59% of the vote to McDermott's 38%.

=== Predictions ===
Source	Ranking	As of
The Cook Political Report	Solid R	March 4, 2022
Inside Elections	Solid R	April 1, 2022
Sabato's Crystal Ball	Safe R	March 1, 2022
Politico	Solid R	April 1, 2022
RCP	Safe R	February 24, 2022
Fox News	Solid R	May 12, 2022
DDHQ	Solid R	July 20, 2022
538	Solid R	July 6, 2022
The Economist	Safe R	September 7, 2022

=== Endorsements ===
Todd Young (R)

Organizations

- Huck PAC
- International Franchise Association
- IUOE Local 150 (co-endorse with McDermott Jr.)
- National Border Patrol Council
- National Federation of Independent Business - Indiana chapter
- National Right to Life Committee
- Pro-Israel America
- Susan B. Anthony Pro-Life America
- HODLpac
- United States Chamber of Commerce

Newspapers

- The Herald Bulletin
Thomas McDermott Jr. (D)

U.S. Representatives

- Frank J. Mrvan, U.S. Representative from IN–01 (2021–present)

State legislators

- Eddie Melton, former state senator from the 3rd district

Labor unions

- Communications Workers of America
- Indiana AFL–CIO
- Indiana Regional Council of Carpenters
- IUOE Local 150 (co-endorse with Young)
- United Mine Workers of America

Organizations

- Everytown for Gun Safety
- National Organization for Women
Haneefah Khaaliq (I) (write-in)

Organizations

- Freethought Equality Fund
- Indiana Civil Rights Agency

=== Polling ===
Poll source	Date(s) administered	Sample size (Note: Key: A – all adults RV – registered voters LV – likely voters V – unclear)	Margin of error	Todd Young (R)	Thomas McDermott Jr. (D)	James Sceniak (L)	Other	Undecided
Civiqs	November 4–7, 2022	707 (LV)	± 4.7%	49%	38%	–	9% (Note: "Someone else" with 9%)	4%
ARW Strategies	September 25–26, 2022	600 (LV)	± 4.0%	39%	37%	6%	–	17%
Change Research (D) (Note: This poll was sponsored by McDermott's campaign)	August 20–24, 2022	2,111 (LV)	± 2.6%	45%	42%	–	–	13%

=== Results ===
2022 United States Senate election in Indiana
Party	Candidate	Votes	%	±%
Republican	Todd Young (incumbent)	1,090,165	58.62%	+6.51%
Democratic	Thomas McDermott Jr.	704,411	37.87%	−4.54%
Libertarian	James Sceniak	63,814	3.43%	−2.04%
Write-in		1,461	0.08%	+0.07%
Total votes		1,859,851	100.0%	N/A
Republican hold				

==== By county ====
County	Todd Young Republican		Thomas McDermott Democratic		Various candidates Other parties		Margin		Total
County	#	%	#	%	#	%	#	%	Total
Adams	6,914	77.3%	1,841	20.6%	195	2.2%	5,073	56.6%	8,950
Allen	59,128	58.1%	39,913	39.2%	2,656	2.6%	19,215	18.9%	101,697
Bartholomew	13,827	61.4%	7,623	33.9%	1,054	4.7%	6,204	27.5%	22,504
Benton	1,938	78.6%	469	19.0%	60	2.4%	1,469	59.6%	2,467
Blackford	2,500	73.7%	740	21.8%	154	4.5%	1,760	50.9%	3,394
Boone	14,178	57.2%	9,159	36.9%	1,469	5.9%	5,019	20.3%	24,806
Brown	3,796	59.7%	2,113	33.2%	446	7.1%	1,683	26.5%	6,355
Carroll	4,644	75.1%	1,267	20.5%	270	4.4%	3,377	54.6%	6,181
Cass	6,250	72.8%	2,081	24.2%	257	3.0%	4,169	48.6%	8,588
Clark	22,389	61.5%	13,061	35.9%	979	2.6%	9,328	25.6%	36,429
Clay	5,885	77.0%	1,507	19.7%	250	3.3%	4,378	57.3%	7,642
Clinton	5,362	73.5%	1,606	22.0%	325	4.4%	3,756	51.5%	7,293
Crawford	2,360	71.0%	983	26.5%	92	2.5%	1,647	44.5%	3,705
Daviess	5,754	82.4%	1,059	15.2%	174	2.4%	4,695	67.2%	6,987
Dearborn	11,309	79.3%	2,628	18.4%	330	2.3%	8,681	60.9%	14,267
Decatur	6,184	76.8%	1,381	17.2%	485	6.0%	4,803	59.6%	8,050
DeKalb	8,584	73.2%	2,773	23.6%	375	3.2%	5,811	49.6%	11,732
Delaware	17,162	57.1%	11,867	39.5%	1,049	3.4%	5,295	17.6%	30,078
Dubois	9,906	72.2%	3,502	25.5%	307	2.3%	6,404	51.7%	13,715
Elkhart	30,852	69.1%	12,635	28.3%	1,165	2.6%	18,217	40.8%	44,652
Fayette	4,720	76.6%	1,274	20.7%	170	2.7%	3,446	55.9%	6,164
Floyd	15,948	59.3%	10,313	38.3%	651	2.4%	5,635	21.0%	26,912
Fountain	3,891	78.1%	945	19.0%	147	2.9%	2,946	59.1%	4,983
Franklin	5,923	80.4%	1,236	16.8%	208	2.8%	4,687	63.8%	7,367
Fulton	4,224	76.5%	1,162	21.1%	134	2.4%	3,062	55.4%	5,520
Gibson	7,612	76.1%	2,205	22.1%	181	1.8%	5,407	54.0%	9,988
Grant	11,383	72.0%	3,927	24.8%	499	3.2%	7,456	47.2%	15,809
Greene	7,033	74.5%	2,098	22.2%	315	3.3%	4,935	52.3%	9,446
Hamilton	70,412	54.5%	52,873	40.9%	5,941	4.6%	17,539	13.6%	129,226
Hancock	15,455	64.5%	6,685	27.9%	1,805	7.6%	8,770	36.6%	23,945
Harrison	10,150	73.4%	3,315	24.0%	367	2.6%	6,835	49.4%	13,832
Hendricks	28,965	59.6%	16,404	33.8%	3,207	6.6%	12,561	25.8%	48,576
Henry	9,388	69.6%	3,338	24.7%	772	5.7%	6,050	44.9%	13,498
Howard	16,738	67.4%	7,289	29.3%	819	3.3%	9,449	38.1%	24,846
Huntington	8,465	74.9%	2,508	22.1%	334	3.0%	5,957	52.8%	11,307
Jackson	8,612	76.6%	2,219	19.7%	309	3.7%	6,393	56.9%	11,240
Jasper	7,050	76.3%	1,982	21.5%	206	2.3%	5,068	54.8%	9,238
Jay	4,084	75.5%	1,182	21.8%	144	2.7%	2,902	53.7%	5,410
Jefferson	6,503	66.3%	3,059	31.2%	241	2.5%	3,444	35.1%	9,803
Jennings	5,992	75.5%	1,532	19.3%	417	5.3%	4,460	56.2%	7,941
Johnson	29,129	64.9%	13,080	29.1%	2,678	6.0%	16,049	35.8%	44,887
Knox	7,468	73.8%	2,369	23.4%	277	2.8%	5,099	50.4%	10,114
Kosciusko	18,033	78.6%	3,996	17.4%	922	4.0%	14,037	61.2%	22,951
LaGrange	5,223	79.1%	1,229	18.6%	147	2.3%	3,994	60.5%	6,599
Lake	57,426	43.0%	73,866	55.3%	2,401	1.7%	-16,440	-12.3%	133,693
LaPorte	17,279	54.1%	13,920	43.6%	763	2.3%	3,359	10.5%	31,962
Lawrence	9,700	75.9%	2,622	20.5%	450	3.6%	7,078	55.4%	12,772
Madison	21,536	60.1%	12,470	34.8%	1,830	5.1%	9,066	25.3%	35,836
Marion	78,138	34.9%	136,473	61.0%	9,095	4.1%	-58,335	-26.1%	223,706
Marshall	9,471	74.1%	2,979	23.3%	331	2.6%	6,492	50.8%	12,781
Martin	2,691	77.0%	666	19.1%	138	3.9%	2,025	57.9%	3,495
Miami	6,524	76.6%	1,713	20.1%	282	3.3%	4,811	56.5%	8,519
Monroe	14,286	35.5%	24,777	61.6%	1,173	2.9%	-10,491	-26.1%	40,236
Montgomery	7,063	72.4%	2,219	22.8%	471	4.8%	4,844	49.6%	9,753
Morgan	15,004	70.6%	4,366	20.5%	1,895	8.9%	10,638	50.1%	21,265
Newton	3,032	76.1%	837	21.0%	113	2.9%	2,195	55.1%	3,982
Noble	8,696	75.8%	2,425	21.1%	355	3.1%	6,271	54.7%	11,476
Ohio	1,458	75.9%	422	22.0%	41	2.1%	1,036	53.9%	1,921
Orange	4,083	75.9%	1,132	21.0%	167	3.1%	2,951	54.9%	5,382
Owen	4,230	68.5%	1,518	24.6%	425	6.9%	2,712	43.9%	6,173
Parke	3,469	77.4%	873	19.5%	139	3.1%	2,596	57.9%	4,481
Perry	3,838	61.7%	2,233	35.9%	152	2.4%	1,605	25.8%	6,223
Pike	2,771	76.0%	806	22.1%	68	1.9%	1,965	53.9%	3,645
Porter	30,158	52.0%	26,643	46.0%	1,180	2.0%	3,515	6.0%	57,981
Posey	6,316	72.4%	2,224	25.5%	187	2.1%	4,092	46.9%	8,727
Pulaski	2,847	76.2%	784	21.0%	104	2.8%	2,063	55.2%	3,735
Putnam	6,954	70.0%	2,254	22.7%	720	7.3%	4,700	47.3%	9,928
Randolph	5,235	76.0%	1,426	20.7%	225	3.3%	3,809	55.3%	6,886
Ripley	6,608	79.3%	1,475	17.7%	249	3.0%	5,133	61.6%	8,332
Rush	3,586	73.7%	965	19.8%	312	6.5%	2,621	53.9%	4,863
St. Joseph	37,726	52.0%	33,013	46.1%	1,382	1.9%	4,263	5.9%	71,671
Scott	4,782	70.0%	1,864	27.3%	186	2.7%	2,918	42.7%	6,832
Shelby	7,991	69.4%	2,704	23.5%	815	7.1%	5,287	45.9%	11,510
Spencer	5,347	70.4%	2,087	27.5%	164	2.1%	3,260	42.9%	7,598
Starke	4,955	72.1%	1,724	25.1%	191	2.8%	3,231	47.0%	6,870
Steuben	6,921	71.5%	2,479	25.6%	276	2.9%	4,442	45.9%	9,676
Sullivan	4,544	71.9%	1,564	24.8%	210	3.3%	2,980	47.1%	6,318
Switzerland	1,956	74.0%	608	23.0%	79	3.0%	1,348	51.0%	2,643
Tippecanoe	19,616	50.7%	17,984	46.5%	1,058	2.8%	1,632	4.2%	38,658
Tipton	3,822	72.7%	1,148	21.8%	290	5.5%	2,674	50.9%	5,260
Union	1,946	78.3%	472	19.0%	68	2.7%	1,474	69.3%	2,486
Vanderburgh	27,255	57.8%	18,886	40.1%	975	2.1%	8,369	17.7%	47,116
Vermillion	3,386	66.9%	1,541	30.5%	133	2.6%	1,845	36.4%	5,060
Vigo	15,559	57.9%	10,639	39.6%	660	2.5%	4,920	18.3%	26,861
Wabash	7,530	76.4%	2,046	20.8%	279	2.8%	5,484	55.6%	9,855
Warren	2,187	77.7%	544	19.2%	83	2.9%	1,643	58.5%	2,814
Warrick	13,456	66.9%	6,251	31.1%	399	2.0%	7,205	37.8%	20,106
Washington	6,119	76.7%	1,615	20.2%	244	3.1%	4,504	56.5%	7,978
Wayne	10,875	65.6%	5,176	31.2%	539	3.2%	5,699	34.4%	16,590
Wells	7,317	80.0%	1,576	17.2%	253	2.8%	5,741	62.8%	9,146
White	4,972	73.9%	1,601	23.8%	156	2.3%	3,371	50.1%	6,729
Whitley	8,586	74.5%	2,442	21.2%	492	4.3%	6,144	53.3%	11,520
Totals	1,090,390	58.6%	704,480	37.9%	65,284	3.5%	385,910	20.7%	1,860,154

Counties that flipped from Democratic to Republican

- LaPorte (largest city: Michigan City)
- Perry (largest city: Tell City)
- Porter (largest city: Portage)
- St. Joseph (largest city: South Bend)
- Vigo (largest city: Terre Haute)

State Senate results

State House results

==== By congressional district ====
Young won seven of nine congressional districts.

District	Young	McDermott Jr.	Representative
1st	46%	52%	Frank J. Mrvan
2nd	65%	32%	Rudy Yakym
3rd	67%	30%	Jim Banks
4th	63%	31%	Jim Baird
5th	59%	37%	Victoria Spartz
6th	64%	31%	Greg Pence
7th	29%	68%	André Carson
8th	68%	30%	Larry Bucshon
9th	64%	33%	Trey Hollingsworth (117th Congress)
9th	64%	33%	Erin Houchin (118th Congress)

== See also ==
- 2022 United States Senate elections
- 2022 Indiana elections

== Notes ==
Partisan clients
