= Rudy Clay =

Rudy Clay may refer to:

- Rahaman Ali (born 1943), boxer, brother of Muhammad Ali, born with the name Rudolph Arnett Clay, later rechristened to Rudolph Valentino Clay
- Rudy Clay (politician) (1935–2013), mayor of Gary, Indiana, USA
