= Jerome Prince (politician) =

American politician

Jerome A. Prince

21st Mayor of Gary, Indiana
- In office January 1, 2020 – December 31, 2023
- Preceded by: Karen Freeman-Wilson
- Succeeded by: Eddie Melton

Personal details
- Born: August 16, 1964 (age 62) Gary, Indiana
- Party: Democratic

Military service
- Allegiance: United States
- Branch/service: (United States Marine Corps) Marine Corps
- Years of service: 1982–1986

Jerome A. Prince (born August 16, 1964) is an American politician who served as the 21st mayor of Gary, Indiana. A member of the Democratic Party, he assumed office on January 1, 2020, succeeding Karen Freeman-Wilson, and served until December 31, 2023, after being defeated in the Democratic primary for mayor by State Senator Eddie Melton.

== Early life ==
Prince was born and raised in Gary, Indiana. He graduated from Lew Wallace High School.

== Career ==
In 1982, Prince enlisted in the United States Marine Corps. In 1986, he returned to Gary and began working in real estate, insurance and retail sales. In 1994, he joined the Calumet Township Assessor's office as a real estate deputy. In 1998, he was elected to the Gary Precinct Committee Organization. In 1999, he was elected to the Gary City Council, representing the fifth district. In 2008, Prince was selected to serve as a member of the Lake County Council after an incumbent member resigned. In 2014, he was elected Lake County Assessor, where he served until 2019.

=== Mayor of Gary ===
Prince was elected mayor of Gary in 2019, defeating incumbent mayor Karen Freeman-Wilson. He assumed office on January 1, 2020. Following the George Floyd protests, Prince pledged to sign an executive order to establish a police reform commission. Prince has advocated for returning manufacturing jobs to Gary. In March 2020, he signed his first executive order, aimed at increasing the hiring of minority, female, and veteran employees by the city government. Prince has also sought to demolish abandoned buildings around Gary as a crime reduction strategy.

On May 2, 2023, State Senator Eddie Melton defeated Prince with almost 59% of the vote to become the Democratic nominee for mayor. Prince conceded and would serve the rest of his term until December 31, 2023.
