= Gary Urban Enterprise Association =

The Gary Urban Enterprise Association (GUEA) was a 501(c)(3) organization developed to provide support and economic aid to the community of Gary, Indiana. It had a short history characterized by corruption.

== State Enterprise Zone Program: Policies and governance ==
In 1983, the Indiana General Assembly created the Enterprise Zone Program. Under this program, local enterprise zone areas were created to address general and economic distress, provide community support, and develop revitalization efforts. Local zones programs were created in twenty-seven various cities including Gary, Hammond, Portage, East Chicago, Michigan City, South Bend, Elkhart, Fort Wayne, Kokomo, Marion, Lafayette, Frankfort, Indianapolis, Terre Haute, Connersville, Bloomington, Bedford, Mitchell, Vincennes, Jeffersonville, New Albany, and Evansville. The local zone programs “serve as catalysts to promote the area to outside groups and individuals and act as a liaison between and among businesses, residents, and state and local governments.”

All Enterprise Zone Programs received oversight and governance from a 20-member State Enterprise Zone Board. This Board was made up of 15 voting members and 5 non-voting members. The Board was charged with broad powers to designate, review, approve, or disqualify enterprise zones. Staff for the Board and daily Zone Programs issues were handled by the Indiana Department of Commerce (IDC).

As originally enacted under Indiana Code, 4-4-61 and then under 5-28-15, Enterprise Zones expire “ten years from the day on which it is designated by the (Enterprise Zone) Board.” Any zone may “be renewed for a period of five years” based “the success of the enterprise zone.” After the initial five-year period, a second and final five-year renewal could be granted. After twenty years, a complete re-designation would need to take place.

== Gary Urban Enterprise Zone: Beginnings ==
For Gary, the State established the Gary Enterprise Zone in 1985. Gary “met the threshold criteria” as laid out by the Enterprise Zone Program. Shortly after being established, he Gary Enterprise Zone was transformed into the Gary Urban Enterprise Association, Inc. (GUEA), an Indiana 501(c)(3) agency. The board then had the following members: i.) Gregory Wilkins (Chairman), ii.) Gardest Gillespie (Vice-Chairman), iii.) Thomas Eskileson, iv.) Douglas Grimes, v.) Taghi Arshami, vi.) Alpha Dixon, vii.) Alyce Blakey, viii.) Jackie Holcomb, and ix.) James Reed.

In 1991, the GUEA was officially reinstated as an Indiana 501 (c)(3) corporation and also gained status as a Federal 501 (c)(3) agency. Under the direction of Executive Director Jihad T. Muhammad and Board Chairman Donald Thompson, the GUEA evolved into “promoting existing business and attract(ing) new industry to diversify the City of Gary’s economy.” In addition to these activities, Director Muhammad and the GUEA Board established “prime examples of creating economic prosperity for citizens of Gary” through programs such as “the Kids Enrichment Program. Business Loans, Christmas Toys Program, Environmental Job Training and Affiliate Programs: the Incubator/Fifth Avenue Mall and Main Street.”

Moreover, under the State Enterprise Zone Program, the GUEA was chartered to work with qualified businesses located within the enterprise zone and to direct fiscal collection or the capture of certain tax abatements, tax credits, and tax exemptions. Programs or tax incentives that funded zone activities included 1.) the Inventory Tax Abatement Program (no property tax on business inventory in the zone), 2.) the Gross Income Tax Exemption Program (exemption from gross income tax in increase in receipts from zone operations). 3.) the Investment Cost Credit Program (State income tax credit for individuals purchasing an ownership interest in zone businesses), 4.) Loan Interest Credit Program (state income tax credit on lender interest income), 5.) Employment Expense Credit Program (State income tax credit based on wages paid to qualified zone employees), and 6.) Employee Tax Deduction Program (qualified employee wages being exempted from State income taxes).

According to a Post-Tribune article dated July 22, 1992, Board Chairman Thompson and Director Muhammad clashed over board governance and agency policies. At a July 1992 meeting, the Board accepted the resignation of Director Muhammad. Muhammad demanded that the Board address a list of demands or that he would resign. Chairman Thompson is noted as saying that by Muhammad “coming to our meeting and giving us ultimatums is incorrigible and impermissible.”

With the resignation of Muhammad, the Board promoted Administrative Assistant Donna Kizer into the position of Interim Executive Director.

In November 1993, Governor Evan Bayh issued an Executive Order Proclamation recognizing and commending the GUEA, its Board, and staff “for their dedication, commitment, and unique contributions to the City of Gary.”

== Donna Kizer – Second Executive Director ==
With the ascension of Donna Kizer the agency's Administrative Assistant to Executive Director, this change in management brought about new appointments in the Board and expansion of the agency. Kizer was also chosen by her colleagues around the state of Indiana to be the founding Director of the Indiana Association of Enterprise Zones.

Under her lead, GUEA revenue grew from $69,000 to nearly $2 million in pledges, revenue and assets for neighborhood development including the award-winning Kids Enrichment Program "KEP" funded in partnership with the Lilly Endowment. KEP provided a nurturing environment for latch-key children as well as employing present and future educators. The developed various partnerships that secured critical zone partners such as the United States Steel Corporation, Republic Steel, Gary Sheet & Tin, Gary Armor Plate, American Bridge, Taylor Forge and Pipe Works, among many others. These businesses greatly benefit from the Inventory Tax Abatement Program and Employee Tax Programs.

Also during this timeframe, according to a Post-Tribune articles dated August 11, 1994, Kizer stressed professional agency advancement and securing professional credentials. She received training in the areas of economic development and finance. Kizer received certification from the National Development Council. Even more important to the GUEA, Kizer secured the first renewal of the enterprise zone status in 1995. As discussed earlier, enterprise zones were allowed an initial lifecycle of ten years and two possible five-year renewals. After the 1995 renewal, a second five-year renewal of the agency could take place in 2000 and provide for an agency lifecycle until 2005. Kizer left GUEA financially with over $2 million, resigning 1996 to relocate and pursue her new Christian path and continuing education providing counseling to people in need.

Legal counsel of Karen Freeman-Wilson was employed by the Board of Directors. During the 1990, the quasi-government Board may have listed political figures and business people such as: Virginia Gianikos, Helena Smith, i.) Oryn Carlisle (President), ii.) Chester Dickson (Vice-President), iii.) Margaret E. Goudeaux (Treasurer), iv.) Johnnie Wright (Secretary), v.) Michael Cervay, vi.) Derrick Earls, vii.) Gardest Gillespie, viii.) Doris Jackson, and ix.) Moses Steele. The GUEA 1997 Return of Organization Exempt from Income Tax Form 990 lists total revenue received in “contributions, gifts, grants, and similar amounts” including “government contributions “as $451,821 and combined net assets at $1,503,831.

== Jojuana Lynn Meeks – Third Executive Director ==
Jojuana commenced her career with the GUEA in 1993. She initially began work with the agency as a secretary. In 1994, Meeks was promoted to Business Development Coordinator.

Under Meeks’ direction, the board was again reformatted. From 1998 to 2001, the board was composed of the following members: i.) Christopher Morrow (president), ii.) Derrick Earls (vice-president), iii.) Margaret Goudeaux, iv.) Johnnie Wright, and v.) Moses Steele. From 2002 to 2005, the Board composition was the same minus the involvement of Margaret Goudeaux.

Jojuana Lynn Meeks significantly reshaped the direction of the agency. Under her guidance and direction, the agency increased its involvement in purchasing and land banking a large number of properties, developed programs to provide construction-based training and residential rehabilitation through the Zone Builders Training Program, increased capture incentive-revenues from zone enterprise companies, oversaw the establishment and roll out of the Airport Development Zone Program, and constructed various physical and capital improvements.

For 2003, the agency's Form 990 submission lists $3,787,661 as revenue received and $10,304,564 in total assets.

From 1998 to 2004, Director Meeks used the increase in revenue to purchase properties. According to property records, Meeks purchased over 655 properties. Meeks was charged with improving conditions with the Gary Enterprise but the funds she received on behalf of the agency purchased properties within the Gary Enterprise Zone as well as outside the Enterprise Zone perimeters in Gary and Northwest Indiana. These properties were primarily purchased at the Lake County Tax sales. Moreover, as being a tax-exempt not-for-profit, the GUEA was required to submit a development plan to Lake County Government showing its intent for these properties in order to maintain tax-free status. Meeks did not provide such reporting. Several properties were purchased out of state in Chicago, Illinois. According to various records, Director Meeks spent over $5,260,417 on property acquisition.

In addition to the rapid purchase of properties, Meeks began the transfer of GUEA assets to the litany of businesses including

1. a construction-based training school, called the Urban Career Institute
2. a developmental corporation, called Urban Enterprise Development Corporation,
3. a housing managing group, called Urban Management Group, and
4. various construction companies such as Community Plumbing, Enterprise Carpenters, Inner-City Electrical, Marbelized Painting, and Tri-City Heating. All of these companies were reviewed both by local and Indianapolis-based legal firms.

In addition to creating these companies for a post-GUEA life, Meeks and her Financial Manager Charmaine Pratchett used the resources of the agency for personal gain and profit. Between Meeks and Pratchett, over $215,000 was charged on personal expenditures on the corporation's credit cards. Further, Meeks and Pratchett received “excess” salary payments between 2001 and 2004. Meeks’ annual salary was set at $45,000 per year. For this four-year period, Meeks received supplemental pay of $45,415. Similarly, Pratchett received $33,927 during this same period.

== End of the Gary Enterprise Zone ==
Based upon investigating reporting guided by whistle blowers, the State Enterprise Zone conducted an investigation of financial records of the Gary Urban Enterprise Association. Theft, malfeasance, misuse of public funds, under-reporting of funds, excess pay, hiring relatives, paying for family member funeral services, investing outside the Enterprise Zone, among many criminal issues were found. Charges were ultimately brought up against Jojuana Lynn Meeks and Charmaine Pratchett. Jojuanna Lynn Meeks received 5 years and 11 months on 13 counts. Charmaine Pratchett received a seven-year prison sentence on the same counts. In addition to the conviction of Meeks and Pratchett, Board members Derrick Earls and Johnnie Wright, Gregory Hill, Lawrence Meeks, Roosevelt Powell, Willie Harris, Will Smith were all convicted of corruption and wrongdoing according to Indiana prosecutors.

In August 2006, the State Enterprise disqualified and closed the Gary Enterprise Zone.
