= Yankeetown, Florida =

Town in the state of Florida, United States

- Town
- Town of Yankeetown
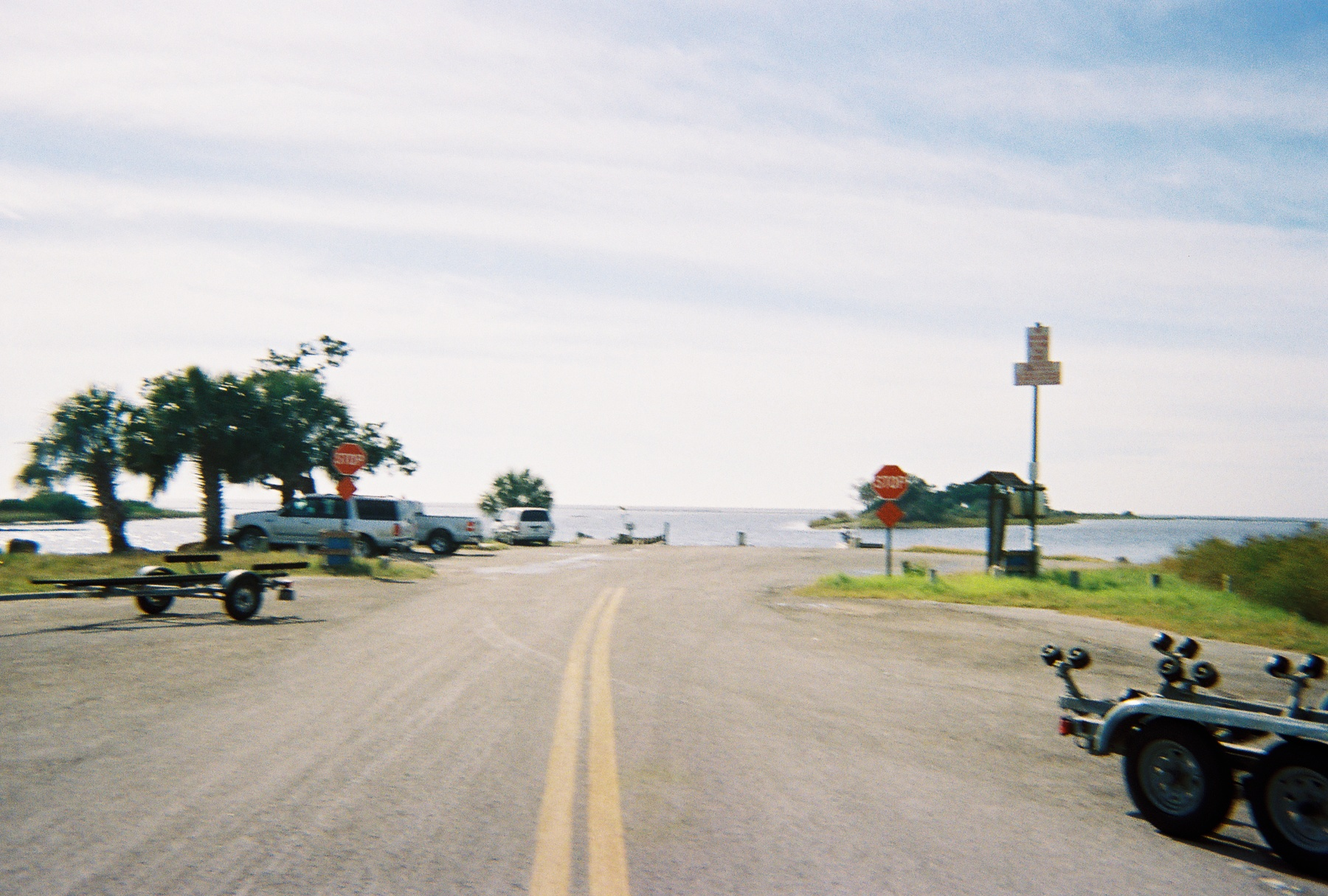
- CR 40 boat ramp off the coast of the Gulf of Mexico in Yankeetown, Florida

- Logo
- Motto: "Old Florida on the Nature Coast"
- Location in Levy County and the state of Florida
- Coordinates: 29°01′40″N 82°45′22″W
- Country: United States
- State: Florida
- County: Levy
- Founded (Knotts Village): 1923
- Incorporated (Town of Yankeetown): 1925

Government
  - Type: Mayor-Council
  - Mayor: Laurence Vorisek
  - Vice Mayor: Timothy "Tim" Ecker
  - Councilor: Allen Casey and Robert "Bob" Terrian
  - Town Administrator and Town Clerk: Seante M. Gyukeri
  - Town Attorney: Ralf Brookes

Area
  - Total: 20.97 sq mi (54.31 km^{2})
  - Land: 7.73 sq mi (20.02 km^{2})
  - Water: 13.24 sq mi (34.29 km^{2})
- Elevation: 10 ft (3.0 m)

Population (2020)
  - Total: 588
  - Density: 76.1/sq mi (29.37/km^{2})
- Time zone: UTC-5 (Eastern (EST))
  - Summer (DST): UTC-4 (EDT)
- ZIP code: 34498
- Area code: 352
- FIPS code: 12-78925
- GNIS feature ID: 2406923
- Website: yankeetownfl.org

Yankeetown is a town in Levy County, Florida, United States. Its located in North Florida along the Gulf of Mexico. It is part of both the Big Bend Coast and the Nature Coast. In the 2020 census, the population was 588, up from 502 at the 2010 census. It is part of the Gainesville, Florida Metropolitan Statistical Area.

== History ==
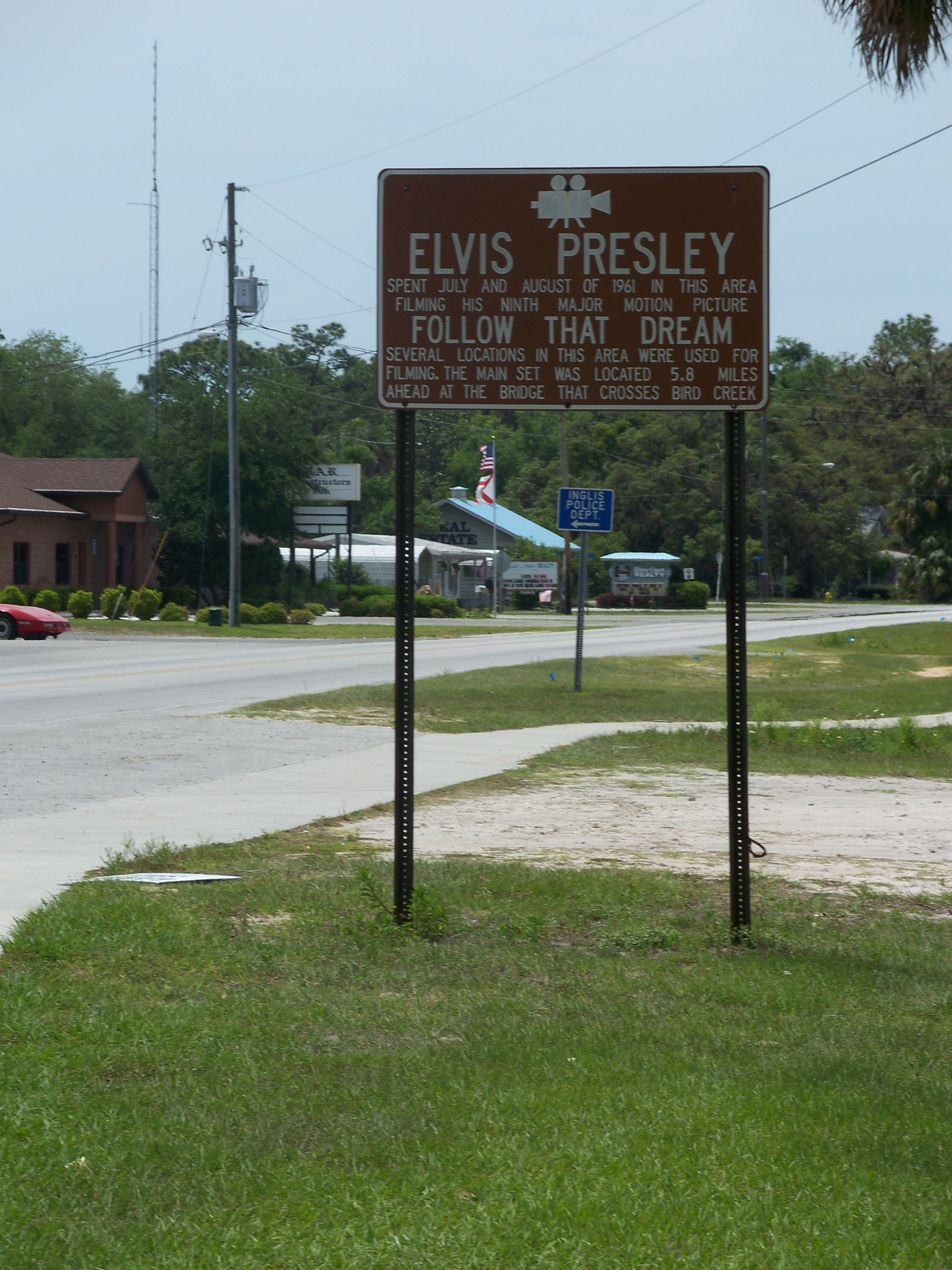
Sign along CR 40 memorializing the filming of the 1962 Elvis Presley movie "Follow That Dream" along the road in nearby Inglis

Yankeetown was founded in 1923 by the Indiana politician and lawyer Armanis F. Knotts, who moved to the area because of his great love for hunting. The settlement was originally an unincorporated village named "Knotts Village", after the founder's surname. However, stories have it that the present name comes from a local mail carrier, an "unreconstructed Confederate," who frequently and derisively directed visitors to the settlement that he called "that Yankee town." The "Town of Yankeetown" was officially incorporated as a municipality in 1925.

The town was initially supposed to be the western end of the 1930s proposed, but never actualized, Cross Florida Barge Canal.

In July and August 1961, the Elvis Presley movie, "Follow That Dream" was filmed in various Florida area, including Yankeetown, and released to theaters in 1962. A western extension of US 41 on County Road 40 (Florida State Road 40) is named Follow That Dream Parkway, after the Elvis film.

== Geography ==
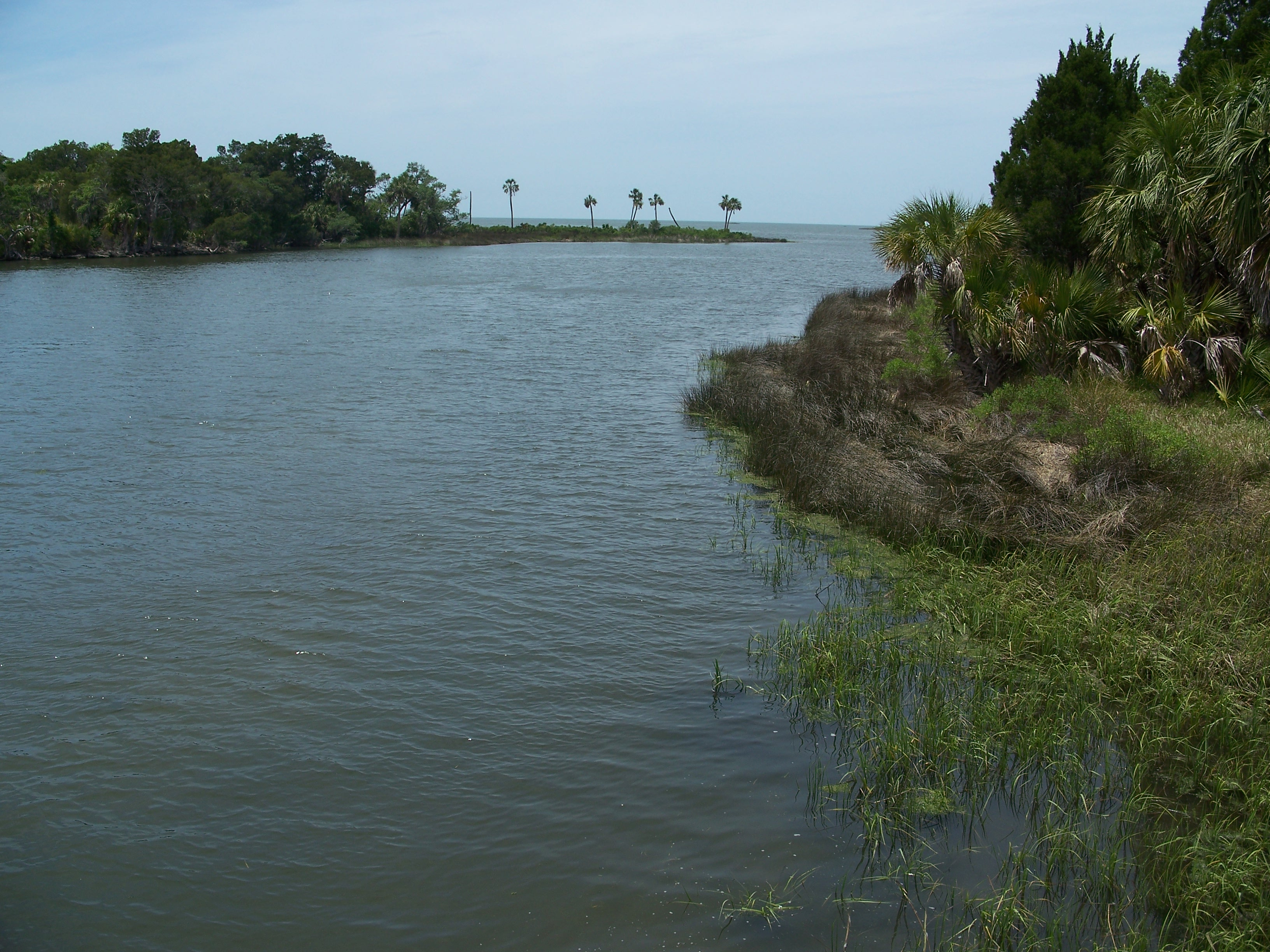
View just west of Yankeetown

The approximate coordinates for the Town of Yankeetown is located in south central Levy County.

The outermost reaches of the town are located around the mouth of the Withlacoochee River and along the Gulf of Mexico.

According to the United States Census Bureau, the town has a total area of 21.1 square miles (54.6 km^{2}), of which 7.6 square miles (19.8 km^{2}) is land and 13.4 square miles (34.8 km^{2}), or 63.75%, is water.

=== Climate ===
The climate in this area is characterized by hot, humid summers and generally mild winters. According to the Köppen climate classification, the Town of Yankeetown has a humid subtropical climate zone (Cfa).

== Demographics ==
Historical population
Census	Pop.	Note	%±
1930	157		—
1940	255		62.4%
1950	322		26.3%
1960	425		32.0%
1970	490		15.3%
1980	600		22.4%
1990	635		5.8%
2000	629		−0.9%
2010	502		−20.2%
2020	588		17.1%
U.S. Decennial Census

=== 2010 and 2020 census ===
Yankeetown racial composition (Hispanics excluded from racial categories) (NH = Non-Hispanic)
Race	Pop 2010	Pop 2020	% 2010	% 2020
White (NH)	480	534	95.61%	90.82%
Black or African American (NH)	0	4	0.00%	0.68%
Native American or Alaska Native (NH)	1	0	0.20%	0.00%
Asian (NH)	1	4	0.20%	0.68%
Pacific Islander or Native Hawaiian (NH)	0	0	0.00%	0.00%
Some other race (NH)	0	2	0.00%	0.34%
Two or more races/Multiracial (NH)	11	18	2.19%	3.06%
Hispanic or Latino (any race)	9	26	1.79%	4.42%
Total	502	588		

As of the 2020 United States census, there were 588 people, 252 households, and 180 families residing in the town.

In 2020, the median household income was $44,318. There was an employment rate of 30.2%, and 28.9% of the population lived below the poverty threshold.

In 2020, 28.2% of the population 25 years or older had a Bachelor's degree or higher. 11.9% of the population were without any healthcare coverage. The median age was 56.0 years old.

In 2020, 11.9% of the population were veterans. 1.8% of the population were foreign-born persons.

As of the 2010 United States census, there were 502 people, 297 households, and 170 families residing in the town.

=== 2000 census ===
As of the census of 2000, there were 629 people, 309 households, and 194 families residing in the town. The population density is 80.4/mi^{2} (31.1/km^{2}). There are 472 housing units at an average density of 60.3/mi^{2} (23.3/km^{2}). The racial makeup of the town is 96.82% White, 0.00% African American, 1.43% Native American, 0.79% Asian, 0.00% Pacific Islander, 0.00% from other races, and 0.95% from two or more races. 0.64% of the population are Hispanic or Latino of any race.

In 2000, there were 309 households out of which 12.3% had children under the age of 18 living with them, 55.3% were married couples living together, 5.8% had a female householder with no husband present, and 36.9% were non-families. 31.4% of all households were made up of individuals and 13.3% had someone living alone who was 65 years of age or older. The average household size was 2.04 and the average family size was 2.48.

In 2000, in the town, the population was spread out with 14.1% under the age of 18, 3.5% from 18 to 24, 15.6% from 25 to 44, 36.6% from 45 to 64, and 30.2% who were 65 years of age or older. The median age was 55 years. For every 100 females, there were 105.6 males. For every 100 females age 18 and over, there were 105.3 males.

In 2000, the median income for a household in the town was $33,304, and the median income for a family was $40,833. Males had a median income of $28,750 versus $31,500 for females. The per capita income for the town was $22,774. 6.8% of families and 12.5% of the population were below the poverty line, including 18.5% of those under age 18 and 11.3% of those age 65 or over.

== Education ==
School Board of Levy County operates the PK–8 Yankeetown School. The Yankeetown Inglis Woman's Club provides Yankeetown and Inglis with the local A. F. Knotts Public Library. The YIWC has a contract with Levy County who provides staffing and books for the local library. The YI Woman's Club is believed to be the last woman's club in the US to own and maintain a public library for their community. The original library opened in 1959, with 1,000 donated books The A.F. Knotts Public Library was named in honor of the town's founder, Armanis F. Knotts, in 1975 by his nephew Eugene Knotts.
