= Post-Tribune (Indiana newspaper) =

Daily newspaper published in Indiana, US

- Type: Daily newspaper
- Format: Broadsheet
- Owner: Tribune Publishing
- Founded: 1907
- Language: English
- Headquarters: Crown Point, Indiana
- Website: post-trib.com

The Post-Tribune of Northwest Indiana (formerly the Gary Post-Tribune) is a daily newspaper headquartered in Merrillville, Indiana, United States. It serves the Northwest Indiana region, and is owned by the Chicago Tribune Media Group.

== History ==
The paper was founded in 1907 as The Gary Weekly. It was established to serve steel industry residents. On September 7, 1908, the weekly became a daily and changed its name to the Gary Tribune. Its founder, J.R. and H.B. Snyder, purchased the Gary Evening Post from Gary mayor Thomas Knotts on March 9, 1910. In July 1921 the two papers were merged producing the Post-Tribune a weekday evening and weekend morning paper. In August 1966, the Snyder heirs sold the publication to Northwest Publications, Inc., a subsidiary of Ridder Publications. "Gary" was dropped from the masthead to further "regionalize" the Post-Tribune, although critics charged that it was an attempt to distance itself from the declining city. In 1974 the Post-Tribune became part of the Knight-Ridder chain of productions. In June, 1986, the Post-Tribune became a morning paper.

Hollinger International (later the Sun-Times Media Group) took over the production on February 2, 1998. The Post-Tribune consolidated its printing with that of the Sun-Times in 2007, at which time it closed its printing plant on Broadway in Gary, ending more than 50 years of press runs there. It moved its main editorial offices from Gary to neighboring Merrillville in 2000. In 2014, it was purchased by the Chicago Tribune Media Group and later converted to a broadsheet format. An abridged edition of the Post-Tribune appears in Northwest Indiana copies of the Sunday Tribune.

== Notable staff ==
- Dorothy Misener Jurney

== Distribution ==
The Post-Tribune is printed early at one of its parent-company's facilities in Chicago, driven to Northwest Indiana and distributed based on delivery region.

Regions are:

- Gary
- Lake County
- Porter County
- Southlake
- Valparaiso

== See also ==
- The Times of Northwest Indiana
- List of newspapers in Indiana
