= Armanis F. Knotts =

American politician

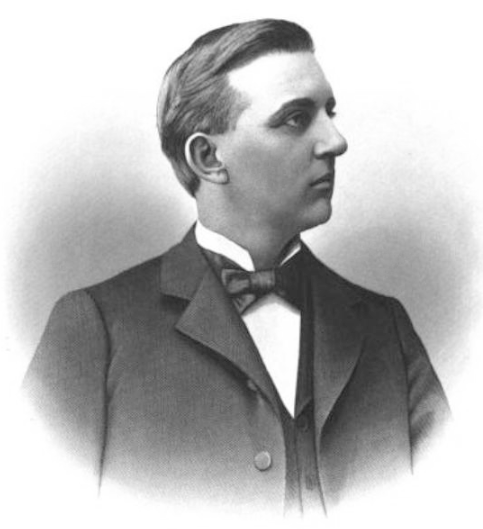

Member of the Indiana House of Representatives from the Lake County and Jasper County district
- In office 1898–1901

Personal details
- Born: January 29, 1856, or February 29, 1860 Highland County, Ohio
- Died: October 3, 1937 (aged 77) Yankeetown, Florida
- Resting place: Woodlawn Cemetery, Ocala, Florida
- Party: Republican
- Spouse: Mary Hennessey (m. 1884)
- Occupation: Lawyer

Armanis F. Knotts (c. 1860 – October 3, 1937), also called A. F. Knotts, was an American politician and lawyer. He was a member of the Indiana House of Representatives and was instrumental in the foundings of both Gary, Indiana and Yankeetown, Florida.

== Biography ==
Knotts was born in Highland County, Ohio on either February 29, 1860 or January 29, 1856 to Frank D. and Margaret (Bell) Knotts. His father was a farmer and carpenter from Pennsylvania, and his mother, a native of Ohio, was the daughter of an early Irish settler of Ohio.

In 1868, the Knotts family moved to Indiana, settling in Medaryville in Pulaski County where he grew up working on the family farm and attending first the local district schools and then Valparaiso University. In 1870, his mother died, and his father married a woman named Jennie Yates. In 1884, Knotts married Mary Hennessey. In the lates 1880s, after spending several years teaching, Knotts enrolled in a law course at Valparaiso. During his studies, he was elected to be the county surveyor of Porter County. He held the office for eighteen months, from 1887 until 1888, then resigned after graduating from the law course.

In 1888, he moved to Hammond, Indiana, where he set up a law practice. He quickly became involved in local politics, and was a strong supporter of the idea of giving Hammond a harbor on Wolf Lake to connect with Lake Michigan, earning the nickname "Harbor Knotts" for his zeal.

He was elected to the Indiana House of Representatives in 1898 as the joint representative of Lake and Jasper counties. As a legislator, he ensured the passage of the Circuit Court bill, which elevated the Superior Court of Hammond to the same level as the Circuit Court, and provided for the building of a new Superior Court House in Hammond. He served one term and then was elected mayor of Hammond from 1902 to 1904. While serving as mayor, he worked on bringing new industries into Hammond.

Armanis and his brother, Thomas Knotts, were also heavily involved in the development of the city of Gary, Indiana. In 1905, the United States Steel Corporation decided to open a new plant in the Midwest, and chose the current site of Gary for its location. They hired Armanis to act as their lawyer, and he worked to purchase the land for the mill, acting surreptitiously so as not to drive up prices. Soon afterwards the Gary Land Company was set up in order to lay out the town and supervise its construction, with Knotts as its manager.

In 1923, Knotts moved to Florida and founded the town of Yankeetown.

== Legacy ==
In 1975, Armanis's nephew Eugene Knotts opened the A. F. Knotts Library in Yankeetown, Florida in honor of his uncle.
