= Rudy Clay (politician) =

American politician (1935–2013)

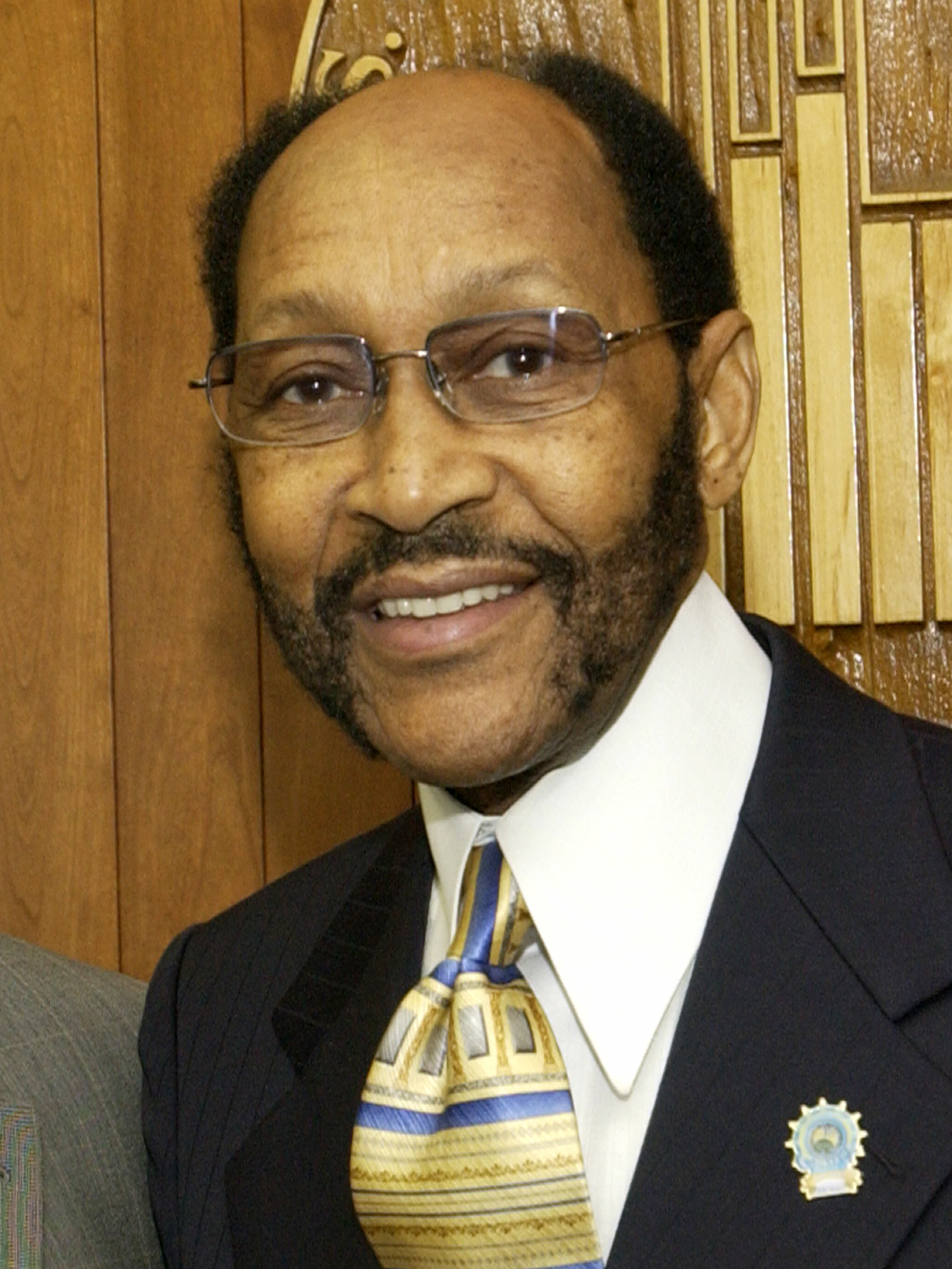
- Clay in 2006

19th Mayor of Gary, Indiana
- In office April 7, 2006 – January 1, 2012
- Preceded by: Dozier Allen Jr.
- Succeeded by: Karen Freeman-Wilson

Member of the Lake County, Indiana Commission from the 1st district
- In office December 12, 1986 – April 7, 2006
- Preceded by: N. Atterson Spann Jr.
- Succeeded by: Roosevelt Allen Jr.

Lake County, Indiana Recorder
- In office January 1, 1985 – 1987
- Preceded by: William Bielski Jr.
- Succeeded by: Richard Blastick

Member of the Lake County, Indiana Council from the 4th district
- In office 1978 – December 30, 1984
- Preceded by: Frank Perry

Member of the Indiana Senate from the 3rd district
- In office 1973–1977
- Preceded by: John Franklin Shawley
- Succeeded by: Katie Hall

Personal details
- Born: July 16, 1935 Hillsboro, Alabama, U.S.
- Died: June 4, 2013 (aged 77) Gary, Indiana, U.S.
- Party: Democratic
- Spouse: Christine Swan
- Children: 1

Military service
- Branch/service: United States Army
- Years of service: 1959–1961

Rudolph M. Clay Sr. (July 16, 1935 – June 4, 2013) was an American activist and politician who was active in Indiana politics as a member of the Democratic Party. Clay was first active in politics with his election to the Indiana Senate from the 3rd district, then served in local politics in Lake County, Indiana, and served as the 19th Mayor of Gary, Indiana. He was the first black person elected to the state senate from Lake County and the first black person elected countywide in Lake County.

Clay was born in Hillsboro, Alabama, and raised by his aunts following the death of his mother. He was educated at Roosevelt High School and Indiana University Bloomington. He served in the United States Army for two years as a Chaplain Assistant. He was active in the Civil rights movement, worked for a civil rights organization in Gary, Indiana, and was awarded by the Southern Christian Leadership Conference.

Clay entered electoral politics with his election to the state senate where he served one term before he was defeated in the Democratic primary by Representative Katie Hall. Following his tenure in the state senate he served as a councilor, recorder, and commissioner in Lake County. He survived an assassination attempt after his election to the county commission. He was elected as mayor of Gary following the resignation of Mayor Scott L. King and served until 2012. He died in 2013.

== Early life ==
Rudolph Clay Sr. was born in Hillsboro, Alabama, on July 16, 1935, to Willie and Maxie Clay. Following the death of his mother he was raised by his aunts Lucy Hunter and Daisy Washington. He graduated from Roosevelt High School in 1953, and attended Indiana University Bloomington. He married Christine Swan, with whom he had one child, in 1957. Clay was drafted into the United States Army in 1959, and served until he was honorably discharged in 1961. During his service in the army he mainly worked as a Chaplain Assistant.

== Career ==
=== Civil rights ===
Clay was involved in the Civil rights movement and participated in marches led by Dr. Martin Luther King Jr. during the 1960s. He was award the Operation Breadbasket Outstanding Activist Award by the Southern Christian Leadership Conference in 1970. He worked as the public relations director for the United Viscounts, a civil rights organization in Gary, Indiana.

=== Indiana Senate ===
==== Elections ====
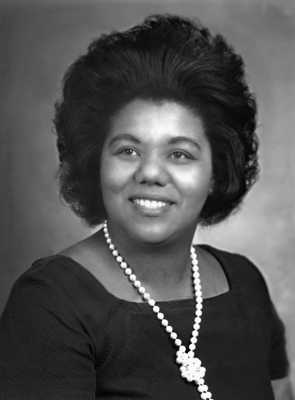
Clay lost renomination in the Democratic primary in the 1976 election to Representative Katie Hall.

Clay ran for the Democratic nomination for a seat in the Indiana Senate from the 3rd district in 1972. He won in the primary against seven other candidates and defeated Republican nominee Fredrick Wood. He was the first black person to represent Lake County, Indiana in the state senate.

Clay ran for reelection to the state senate in the 1976 election, but was defeated in the Democratic primary by Representative Katie Hall. Clay was one of four incumbent Democratic members of the state senate to lose renomination. Clay filed lawsuit for a recount, but the recount maintained Hall's victory. Hall won in the general election without opposition.

==== Tenure ====
During Clay's tenure he was the ranking minority member of the Public Health committee. He also served on the Affairs of Lake County, Legislative Apportionment, and Natural Resources, Ecology and Agriculture committees.

Clay and Representatives Jewell Harris and Robert Freeland, who were all black, boycotted a dinner at The Columbia Club that they were invited to as the club refused membership to black people. The Indiana NAACP gave support to the boycott.

During a riot in 1973, at the Indiana State Prison, where prisoners took control of three cellblocks and held three officers hostage, Clay offered to work as an intermediary in the negotiations. One of the officers was let go after the prisoners talked to Clay and the riot ended after thirty-five hours. The prisoners met a delegation consisting of reporters, Clay, and Representative Robert DuComb.

=== Local politics ===
In 1978, Clay filed to run for a seat on the Lake County, Indiana council from the 4th district. He defeated incumbent Councilor Frank Perry in the Democratic primary and won in the general election without opposition. He won reelection against Republican nominee Joseph Stojakovich in the 1982 election. During his tenure on the council Clay served as president.

On January 6, 1984, Clay announced that he would run for the Democratic nomination for Lake County Recorder to succeed William Bielski Jr., who was term-limited. He won the Democratic nomination against ten other candidates which included Johnny McWilliams, who had the support of Gary Mayor Richard G. Hatcher, Leonard Bielski, the brother of the incumbent recorder, and Mathias A. Kerger, a former member of the state senate. He defeated Republican nominee Alan L. Banister in the general election. He was the first black person elected countywide in Lake County. He resigned from the county council on December 30, 1984, to become county recorder.

=== County Commission ===
==== Elections ====
In 1986, Clay ran for a seat on the Lake County Commission from the 1st district, defeated incumbent Commissioner N. Atterson Spann Jr. and four other candidates in the Democratic primary, and defeated Republican nominee Fredrick Congress general election. Richard Blastick succeeded Clay as county recorder.

On October 10, 1989, Clay announced that he would run for reelection to the county commission and won in the 1990 election. Clay defeated Gerald Hayes and Velia Taneff in the 1994 Democratic primary and faced no opposition in the general election.

During the 1998 election Clay successfully sued to have Carlos Clay removed from the Democratic primary ballot stating that Carlos was meant to mislead voters. Clay was endorsed by five of the six Democratic district captains in Gary, but Morris Carter and Robert Freeland accused him of using patronage to gain those endorsements. He defeated Carter, Freeland, Lyndell Vanzant, and Jasinto Carter in the primary.

Suzette Raggs, the deputy mayor of Gary, ran against Clay in the 2002 Democratic primary with the support of Mayor Scott L. King. On March 8, Clay filed to have Epifanio Marrero removed from the primary ballot stating that Marrero lived in Porter County and a court ruled in Clay's favor on May 2. Clay defeated Raggs, Daniel Spolijoric, and Tony Walker in the primary and Republican nominee Charles Kirkland in the general election.

==== Tenure ====
During Clay's tenure as commissioner he was called a "traitor to the Democratic Party" by Representative Paul Hric for replacing county workers who were members of the Democratic Party with members of the Republican Party. Clay voted to make Ernest Niemeyer, a Republican, president of the county commission in 1994. Clay served as president and vice president of the commission multiple times.

On December 8, 1986, an assassination attempt was made against Clay when a sniper shot him three times in the shoulder and lower back after waiting outside his home. Two men were reported to have been involved in the attempted assassination. On December 12, he was sworn in on to the county commission earlier than the normal date so that Spann Jr., who would take over if Clay died, would not take over. Later an attack was made against Lake County Councilman Andrew Smith when two shotgun blasts were fired into Smith's home and Smith believed that the attack was related to the assassination attempt against Clay.

Payphones owned by RCD Pay Phones were installed in Gary's courthouse. In 1998, Richard Dunne, the owner of RCD, said that the deal was created at a secret meeting between Clay, Clay's business associate Maggie Taylor, and RCD executives in 1996. Dunne also said that he was required to give $1,000 to Clay on November 26, 1996. The contracts were invalid as they only had the signature of one commissioner, Clay, instead of the two required. Clay denied the allegations and U.S. Attorney Jon DeGuilio requested the FBI to investigate. Taylor admitted that she accepted $2,100 to make the contracts. Dunne later recanted his allegations.

=== Democratic politics ===
During the 1988 Democratic presidential primaries Clay ran as a delegate for Jesse Jackson despite attempts made by former Mayor Hatch and Jackson's presidential campaign to prevent them from appearing on the ballot. Clay won election as a delegate, but the Democratic National Committee's credentials committee selected Hatcher, who was the vice-chair of Jackson's campaign, to go to the convention instead of Clay while Barnes was sent to the convention instead of the Jackson-supported Carlos Tolliver. However, another decision was made where Barnes, Clay, Hatcher, and Tolliver would all attend the convention with half-voting power.

Clay was an elector for Al Gore during the 2000 presidential election. He endorsed Barack Obama during the 2008 Democratic presidential primaries, campaigned for him in South Carolina, and served as a delegate to the Democratic National Convention. Clay called for Obama to select U.S. Senator Evan Bayh as his running mate.

Clay ran to serve as chair of the Gary Democratic Precinct Organization and won on March 13, 1993, after defeating incumbent chair Richard Comer, who also served as Deputy Mayor. He was reelected in 1997. Stephen Stiglich, the chair of the Lake County Democratic Party since 1997, sought reelection in 2005, but the Democratic State Central Committee voted to make Clay chair on April 19. King, who supported Stiglich, left the Democratic Party and became an independent after Clay's selection. During the 2007 mayoral election Karen Freeman-Wilson requested Dan Parker, chair of the Indiana Democratic Party, to suspend Clay's chairmanship, but Parker said that he did not have that power and Clay refused to step down. Clay ran for reelection as chair, but was defeated by Thomas McDermott Jr. on March 7, 2009.

=== Mayor ===
Rep. Pete Visclosky, Mayor Clay, Sen. Evan Bayh, Maj. Gen. R. Martin Umbarger, and Gov. Mitch Daniels at the ribbon cutting of the Gary Limited Army Aviation Support Facility on Oct. 24, 2008

Clay supported Vernon Smith during the 2000 mayoral election. Clay was a candidate in the 2003 mayoral election, but withdrew from the election. He stated that there were too many candidates in the race and that the divided opposition would allow King to win renomination. King won reelection.

King resigned on March 23, 2006, and deputy mayor Dozier Allen Jr. replaced him as acting mayor. A Democratic caucus was held to select a person to serve the remainder of King's term. Clay announced his campaign on March 27, and defeated Allen and John Hall. Clay continued running for reelection in the concurrent commissioner election as he would have more influence over the selection of his replacement through a caucus selection. Calumet Township board member Roosevelt Allen Jr. defeated Clay in the primary.

In 2007, Clay won the Democratic primary against multiple candidates, including Freeman-Wilson, and defeated Republican nominee Charles Smith Jr. and write-in candidate Eddie Tarver in the general election. Clay initially sought reelection in 2011, but withdrew on April 8, 2011, after being diagnosed with prostate cancer. He endorsed Freeman-Wilson although name remained on the Democratic primary ballot. Freeman-Wilson was elected to succeed him.

Morgan Quitno Press listed Gary as the tenth most dangerous city in the United States during Clay's tenure. Clay served as head of the Gary Sanitary District. He requested that Gary receive $400 million of the $5 billion allotted to Indiana by the American Recovery and Reinvestment Act of 2009.

== Death and legacy ==
Clay died on June 4, 2013, in Gary. In 2014, a section of U.S. Route 20 that went through Gary was renamed in honor of Clay.

== Political positions ==
Clay called for the United States House of Representatives to impeach President Richard Nixon in 1974.

Clay wrote a letter to President Gerald Ford informing him of his opposition to Ford's raising food stamp prices and he introduced a resolution in the state senate calling for Congress to reject Ford's proposed increase.

=== Amendments ===
The state senate voted thirty-four to sixteen, with Clay in favor, against ratifying the Equal Rights Amendment in 1973. In 1975, Clay introduced a resolution in the state senate calling for the United States Congress to pass an amendment to the United States Constitution to make the president elected through the popular vote instead of through the electoral college.

=== Crime and legal ===
The state senate voted forty to nine, with Clay against, in favor of maintaining the death penalty. In 1973, the state senate voted thirty-one to eighteen, with Clay against, in favor of legislation to allow local, county, and state police access to certain types of wire taps. Clay asked for George Phend, the Superintendent of Indiana State Reformatory, to allow prisoners to kiss their wives citing results from the policy at the prison in Terre Haute, Indiana where it helped rehabilitation and lowered homosexuality. Clay opposed a resolution by Senator Marlin McDaniel which would have the state legislature be put on record as opposing amnesty for people involved in prison disturbances. Clay attempted to ban gun shows in Lake County and the sale of guns on county property.

=== Civil rights ===
Clay opposed desegregation busing. Clay introduced legislation to recognize a state holiday in honor of Martin Luther King Jr. in 1974.

== Electoral history ==
1972 Indiana Senate 3rd district election
Party	Candidate	Votes	%
Democratic	Rudolph Clay	23,908	87.48%
Republican	Frederick Wood	3,421	12.52%
Total votes		27,329	100.00%

1976 Indiana Senate 3rd district Democratic primary
Party	Candidate	Votes	%
Democratic	Katie Hall	10,112	51.59%
Democratic	Rudolph Clay (incumbent)	9,488	48.41%
Total votes		19,600	100.00%

1978 Lake County, Indiana Council 4th district election
Primary election
Party	Candidate	Votes	%
Democratic	Rudolph Clay	5,715	79.74%
Democratic	Frank Perry (incumbent)	1,452	20.26%
Total votes		7,167	100.00%
General election
Democratic	Rudolph Clay	12,871	100.00%
Total votes		12,871	100.00%

1982 Lake County, Indiana Council 4th district election
Party	Candidate	Votes	%	±%
Democratic	Rudolph Clay (incumbent)	22,083	95.96%	−4.04%
Republican	Joseph Stojakovich	929	4.04%	+4.04%
Total votes		23,012	100.00%	

1982 Lake County, Indiana Council Recorder election
Party	Candidate	Votes	%
Democratic	Rudolph Clay	114,346	60.29%
Republican	Alan L. Banister	75,317	39.71%
Total votes		189,663	100.00%

1986 Lake County, Indiana Commission 1st district election
Primary election
Party	Candidate	Votes	%
Democratic	Rudolph Clay	13,952	45.95%
Democratic	N. Atterson Spann Jr. (incumbent)	10,870	35.80%
Democratic	Reginald DuBose	2,292	7.55%
Democratic	Gerald Hayes	1,799	5.92%
Democratic	Antonia Garner	898	2.96%
Democratic	Harry L. Short	552	1.82%
Total votes		30,363	100.00%
General election
Democratic	Rudolph Clay	27,977	84.10%
Republican	Frederick Congress	5,291	15.90%
Total votes		33,268	100.00%

1998 Lake County, Indiana Commission 1st district election
Primary election
Party	Candidate	Votes	%
Democratic	Rudolph Clay (incumbent)	10,953	50.64%
Democratic	Morris Carter	5,217	24.12%
Democratic	Robert Freeland	4,091	18.92%
Democratic	Lyndell Vanzant	859	3.97%
Democratic	Jasinto Carter	508	2.35%
Total votes		21,628	100.00%
General election
Democratic	Rudolph Clay (incumbent)	29,645	100.00%
Total votes		29,645	100.00%

2006 Gary, Indiana mayoral Democratic caucus
Party	Candidate	Votes	%
Democratic	Rudy Clay	66	50.38%
Democratic	Dozier Allen Jr. (incumbent)	64	48.85%
Democratic	John Hall	1	0.76%
Total votes		131	100.00%

2007 Gary, Indiana mayoral election
Primary election
Party	Candidate	Votes	%
Democratic	Rudy Clay (incumbent)	9,139	44.36%
Democratic	Karen Freeman-Wilson	5,539	26.89%
Democratic	Charles Hughes	2,868	13.92%
Democratic	Darren Washington	2,515	12.21%
Democratic	Norman Roby	215	1.04%
Democratic	Larry Anderson	69	0.33%
Democratic	John Henry Hall	64	0.30%
Democratic	Theresa Moses Sturdivant	62	0.30%
Democratic	Larry Evans	57	0.28%
Democratic	Pierre Strickland	46	0.22%
Democratic	Ulysses Burnett	28	0.14%
Total votes		20,602	100.00%
General election
Democratic	Rudy Clay (incumbent)	8,529	74.93%
Republican	Charles Smith Jr.	2,569	22.57%
Independent	Eddie Tarver (write-in)	284	2.50%
Total votes		11,382	100.00%

2009 Lake County, Indiana Democratic Party chair election
Party	Candidate	Votes	%
Democratic	Thomas McDermott Jr.	405	59.12%
Democratic	Rudy Clay (incumbent)	280	40.88%
Total votes		685	100.00%
