= Scott L. King =

American mayor

Mayor of Gary
- In office 1996–2006
- Preceded by: Thomas V. Barnes
- Succeeded by: Dozier T. Allen (acting); Rudolph M. Clay

Personal details
- Occupation: Lawyer

Scott L. King was mayor of Gary, Indiana from 1996 to 2006, when he resigned.

== Education and career ==
King received his bachelor's degree from Concordia University and his law degree from Valparaiso University School of Law. He practiced law in Gary, Indiana. King was a prosecutor for the state of Indiana and an assistant United States attorney for the Northern District of Indiana.

== Mayor of Gary, Indiana ==
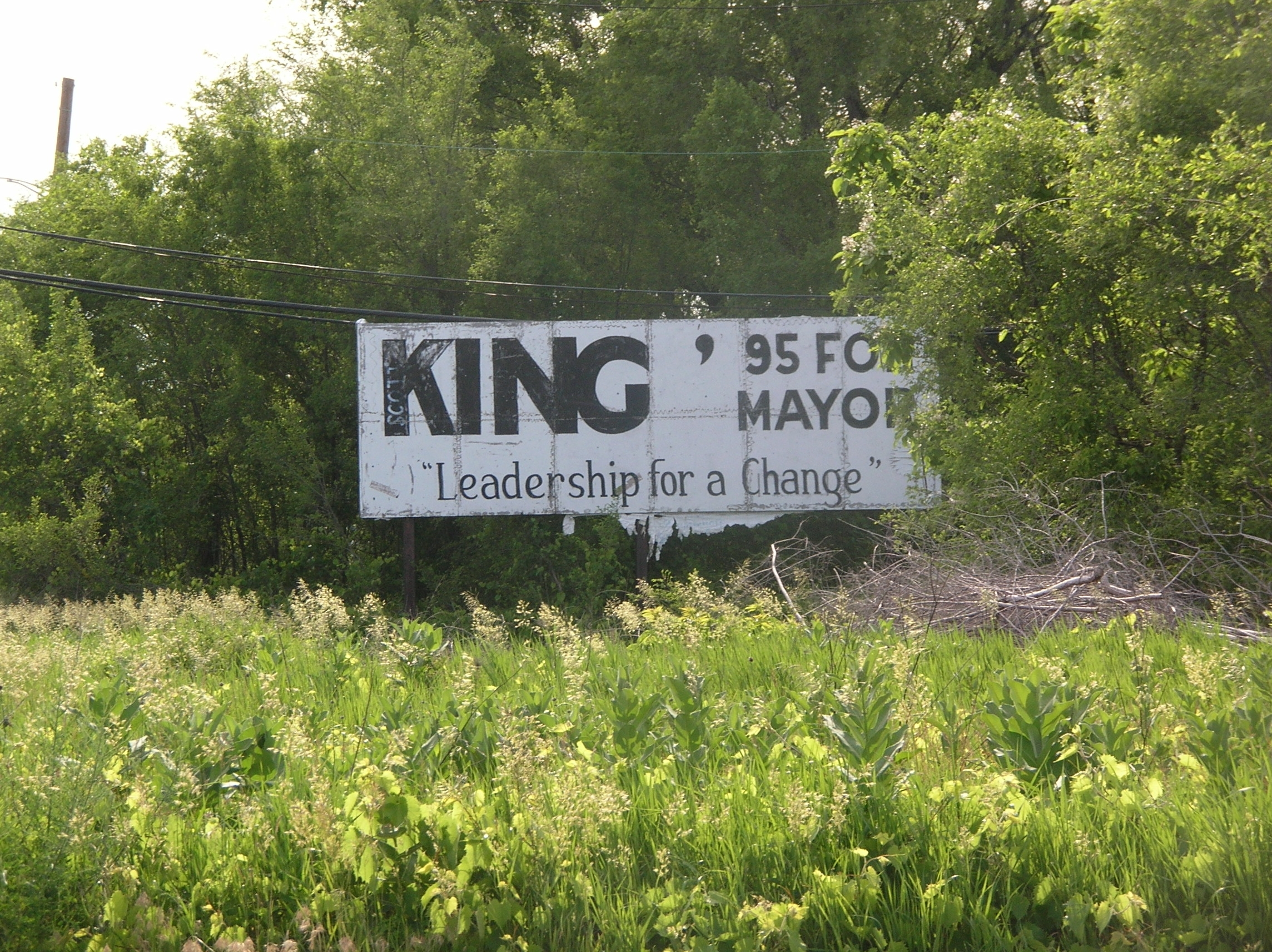
A sign from Scott King's 1995 campaign

He was Gary's first white mayor since the election of Richard Hatcher in 1967. A member of the Democratic Party for most of his time in office, King left the party to become an independent in 2005, shortly before his resignation. He was briefly succeeded by then-deputy mayor and former Calumet Township trustee Dozier T. Allen as acting mayor, and subsequently by Rudy Clay.

== Notes ==
- Appearances on C-SPAN
