= List of mayors of Gary, Indiana =

This is a list of mayors of Gary, Indiana. The first mayor, Thomas Knotts, served as Town Board president from 1906 to 1909, when Gary officially became a city. Every mayor since 1943 has served as a member of the Democratic Party.

	Portrait	Mayor	Term start	Term end	Party
1		Thomas Knotts (1861–1921; aged 60)	1906	1914	Democratic
2		Roswell O. Johnson (1st) (1872–1938; aged 66)	1914	1918	Republican
3		William F. Hodges	1918	1922	Republican
4		Roswell O. Johnson (2nd)	1922	March 1925	Republican
5		William J. Fulton	March 1925	1926	Republican
6		Floyd E. Williams	1926	1930	Republican
7		Roswell O. Johnson (3rd)	1930	1935	Republican
8		Lee B. Clayton	1935	1939	Democratic
9		Ernst Schaible (1879–1954)	1939	1943	Republican
10		Joseph E. Finerty (1905–07.11.1992; aged 87)	1943	1948	Democratic
11		Eugene Swartz	1948	1952	Democratic
12		Peter Mandich	1952	July 15, 1958	Democratic
13		George Chacharis (11.02.1908–17.08.1983; aged 75)	July 16, 1958	December 12, 1962	Democratic
14		John S. Visclosky (26.12.1915–01.04.2017; aged 101)	December 13, 1962	1963	Democratic
15		A. Martin Katz (1917–1995; aged 78)	1964	1968	Democratic
16		Richard Hatcher (1933–2019; aged 86)	January 1, 1968	December 31, 1987	Democratic
17		Thomas V. Barnes (born in 1936; age 89–90)	January 1, 1988	December 31, 1995	Democratic
18		Scott L. King (born in 1951; age 74–75)	January 1, 1996	March 23, 2006	Democratic
–		Dozier Allen Jr. (born in 1931; age 94–95)	March 24, 2006	April 6, 2006	Democratic
19		Rudy Clay (1935–2014; aged 78)	April 7, 2006	December 31, 2011	Democratic
20		Karen Freeman-Wilson (born in 1960; age 65)	January 1, 2012	December 31, 2019	Democratic
21		Jerome A. Prince (born in 1964; age 61)	January 1, 2020	December 31, 2023	Democratic
22		Eddie Melton (born in 1980; age 46)	January 1, 2024	incumbent	Democratic
