= Religious affairs specialist =

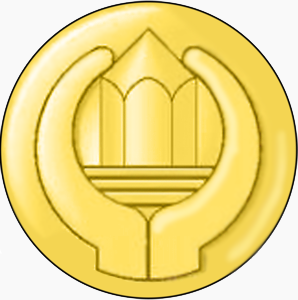
Collar insignia for enlisted religious affairs soldiers.

A religious affairs specialist, previously known as chaplain assistant, is a member of the U.S. Army Chaplain Corps. This soldier provides expertise in religious support and religious support operations. The Religious Affairs Specialists, which is military occupational specialty (MOS) 56M, support the unit Chaplain and Commander in responding to the needs of soldiers, family members, and other authorized personnel. They provide security to Army chaplains. Duties include preparing spaces for worship, managing supplies, and ensuring the security and safety of the chaplain during combat situations.

The religious affairs specialist is an enlisted soldier or non-commissioned officer that is part of a "task/organized, mission/based team designed to accomplish and support the specified religious, spiritual and ethical needs of soldiers in accordance with command responsibilities." Religious affairs specialists are part of unit ministry teams, which consist of one Army chaplain and religious affairs specialist or a religious affairs non-commissioned officer.

== History ==
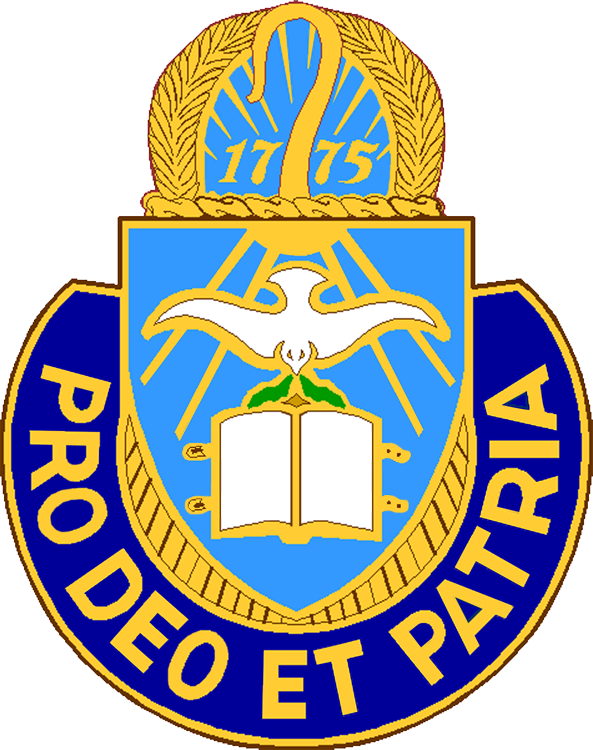
Branch insignia for the US Army Chaplain Corps

The official military occupation specialty (MOS) of chaplain assistant was established by General Orders No. 253, War Department, Washington, D.C., on 28 December 1909. One enlisted man would then be detailed and placed on special duty, by the commanding officer of any organization to which a chaplain is assigned for duty, to assist the chaplain in the performance of his official duties. Although "high moral character was required, no prerequisites or recognized criteria for performance"

In 1927 and 1933, the Chaplain Corps made suggestions to the Secretary of War to provide a small corps of specialized enlisted soldiers through the efforts proved to be unsuccessful. The job continued to have no vocational integrity until after World War II. The Korean War saw the development of the MOS 7lB. After almost a century of vague, the MOS 71B, chaplain assistant. "The chaplain assistant initially attended a four-week course at Fort Dix or Fort Ord". The trainees were volunteers who had completed nine weeks of basic combat training and nine weeks of clerk typist advanced individual training (AIT)

In August 1965, during a major revision of Army Regulation 611-201, chaplain assistants were designated 71M, given a job description and specific skill requirements. "The next year the chaplain assistant schools were merged into the US Army Chaplain Center and School (USACHCS) at Fort Hamilton". Then in 1972, the 71M was implemented into the Non-Commissioned Officer Education System (NCOES) and was accorded the same degree of professionalism as other enlisted specialties. "Since 1974, the chaplain assistant and the chaplain have come together forming the highly professional Unit Ministry Team (UMT) concept".

In October 2001, the chaplain assistant MOS changed from 71M to 56M. Chaplain Assistants serve in a "stand-alone" Career Management Field. Chaplain Assistants "team up with chaplains around the world to provide religious support to Soldiers and Families across the full spectrum of military operations".

On 20 March 2015, the Office of the Chief of Chaplains (OCCH) of the United States Army approved the naming convention of 56M MOS from chaplain assistant to religious affairs specialist.

== Roles and responsibilities ==
=== Religious affairs specialist ===
- The religious affairs specialist serves as the enlisted subject matter expert and, under the direction of a chaplain, executes the commander’s religious support operations and conducts soldier crisis management.
- Religious affairs specialists can support additional duties that contribute to the welfare of the command; however, commanders must consult with their assigned chaplain before assigning additional duties.
- Religious affairs specialists will not support unit additional duties that impede the ability of the team or section to perform the commander’s religious support operations, such as Suicide Prevention Program Manager, Casualty Assistance Officer or Master Resiliency Trainer.
- Religious affairs specialists will not be required to reveal confidential communications they encounter when supporting the chaplain, nor will they serve in any capacity that may compel them to disclose such information, including such duties as UVA or SARC.
- Religious affairs specialists will support both the unit and garrison Command Master Religious Program (CMRP) and be integrated into chapel activities at their home station or deployment location.
- Religious affairs specialists will participate in UMT and unit training and become “expert” in their MOS, Warrior tasks and battle drills.
- Religious affairs specialists directly support the religious support operations and are supervised, counseled and rated by a supervisory chaplain or senior religious affairs NCO. Religious affairs specialists receive their duty schedule and task list from the appropriate technical religious affairs NCO and supervisory chain in support of mission requirements. The technical supervisory and rating chains determine the accountability reporting process based on local procedures.
- Religious affairs specialists will not accept fees for performing any functions that are part of their official duties.

=== Religious affairs non-commissioned officer ===
- Advise commanders and command sergeants major on all matters pertaining to religious affairs specialist (56M) training, manning, and growth and development of the Soldiers career track and lifelong learning cycle.
- Coordinate and recommend UMT policy for the command.
- Conduct UMT staff assistance visits and organization inspections of UMT activities, training, facilities, perform- ance, and professional development and growth.
- Provide staff guidance and training in leadership, military acculturation, mobilization, contingency team building, administration, personnel management, and CTOF procedures.
- Plan, resource, supervise, conduct, and evaluate staff training for religious affairs specialists.
- Lead or participate in unit training and participate in command ceremonies, as required.
- Monitor and recommend religious affairs specialist personnel assignments and utilization to the command.
- Facilitate the CMRP through effective coordination and collaboration with other senior NCOs of the command.
- Review the 56M portion of force structure documents (The Army Authorization Document System and the Personnel Manning Authorization Document).
- Assist Soldiers in sustaining and developing Army values, moral leadership, and conflict resolution skills.
- See DA Pam 611–21 for additional senior 56M (SGT through SGM) responsibilities.
