= Thomas Knotts =

American mayor

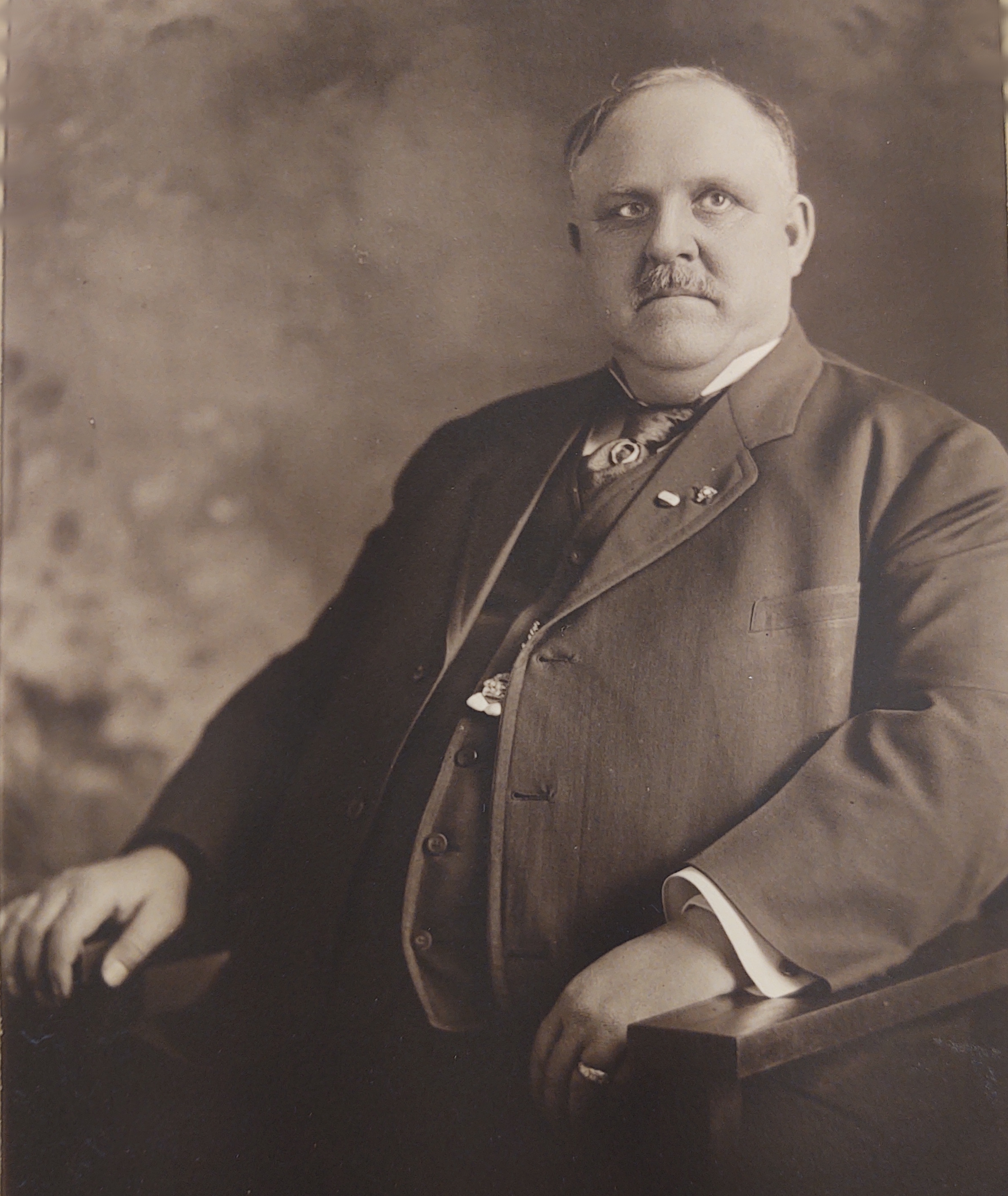
Thomas E. Knotts, first mayor of Gary, Indiana

Thomas Elwood Knotts (1861–1921) was the first mayor of the city of Gary, Indiana, serving from 1909 to 1913, after having previously served as head of the Gary town board from 1906 to 1909. He was also Gary's first postmaster. His business ventures included the Gary Evening Post, later merged into the Gary Post-Tribune, and the Gary Trust & Savings Bank, both of which he founded in 1909.

Knotts was born in Highland County, Ohio, in 1861, and subsequently graduated from Valparaiso University. He was the younger brother of Armanis Knotts, an early mayor of Hammond, Indiana. Prior to taking up the administration of Gary, Tom served as Superintendent of the Indian Schools in South Dakota during the presidency of Grover Cleveland. Tom Knotts moved to Hammond in 1891, where he combined local entrepreneurship with various positions in the Hammond police department. He moved to Gary in 1906, just as construction on the new city began, making him one of the city's first citizens.

Knotts was a Democrat and longtime supporter of organized labor. He founded and edited the pro-labor Calumet Journal in Hammond from 1891 to 1894. His work on that paper led to his arrest in 1894, when he urged readers to defy a judge's injunction against interfering with railroad traffic during the Pullman Strike in 1894. He ran for mayor of Gary in 1909 as "the People's Mayor" and won election by canvassing in the working-class neighborhoods of the city.

Knotts's roles on the town board and as mayor made him a leading member of the "town forces" in a struggle against US Steel for political control of the city. The struggles resulted in Knotts being arrested 14 times on various charges, including election fraud, embezzlement, perjury, and accepting bribes. Knotts's supporters noted that he was never convicted. They took this as proof that the charges were spurious and meant to remove him from office. Knotts was defeated in the 1913 election by the company-backed Republican candidate, Roswell Johnson.

Knotts died on March 26, 1921, in Rochester, Minnesota, following surgery performed by Charles Mayo. (Dr. Mayo was reluctant to perform the surgery, believing that Knotts's chances were slim, but Tom Knotts persuaded him to try.) Clarence Darrow, who was a friend of Knotts's, came from Colorado to deliver his eulogy to an overflow crowd at the 940-seat Orpheum Theater in Gary on March 29, 1921. "Tom Knotts did not cringe before the powerful nor was he content to drift with the tide," Darrow said; "Such a man must naturally lead a stormy life."

== Works cited ==
- Howat, William Frederick (1915). A standard history of Lake County, Indiana, and the Calumet region, Volume 1.
- Lane, James B. (1979). City of the century: a history of Gary, Indiana. ISBN 0-253-11187-0.
- Moore, Powell A. (1959). The Calumet Region: Indiana's last frontier. Indiana Historical Bureau.
