= Karen Freeman-Wilson =

American mayor (born 1960)

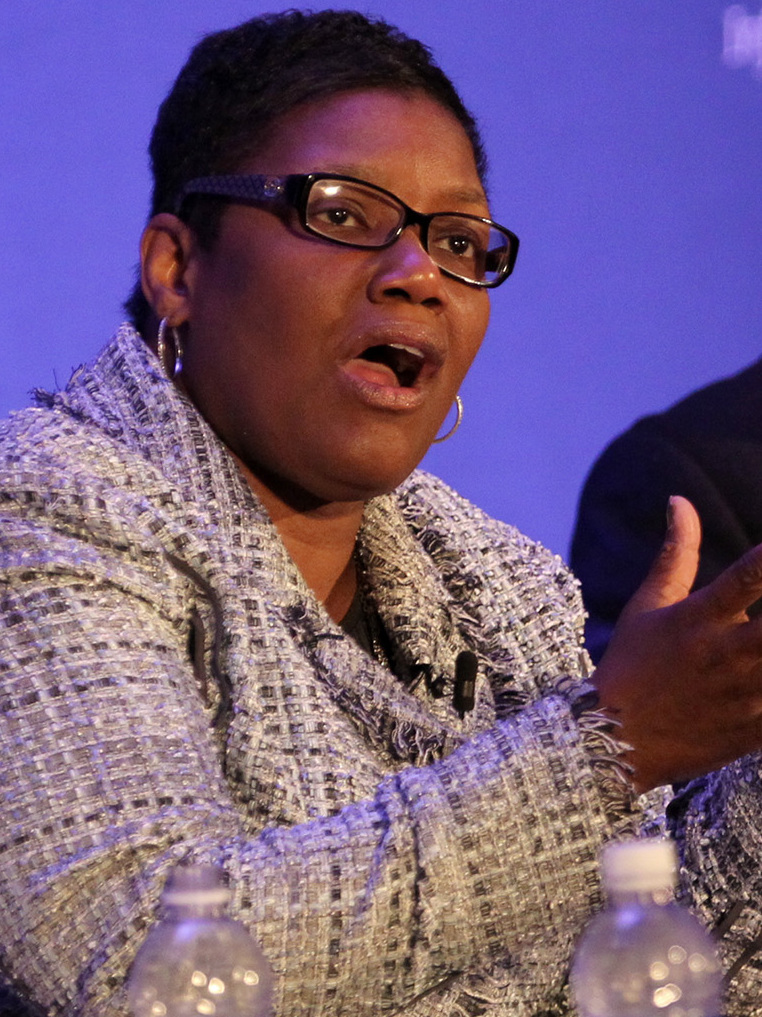
- Freeman–Wilson in 2014

20th Mayor of Gary
- In office January 1, 2012 – December 31, 2019
- Preceded by: Rudy Clay
- Succeeded by: Jerome Prince

93rd President of the National League of Cities
- In office 2019
- Preceded by: Mark Stodola
- Succeeded by: Joe Buscaino

40th Attorney General of Indiana
- In office June 8, 2000 – January 14, 2001
- Governor: Frank O'Bannon
- Preceded by: Jeff Modisett
- Succeeded by: Steve Carter

Personal details
- Born: Karen Marie Freeman; October 24, 1960 (age 65) Gary, Indiana, U.S.
- Party: Democratic
- Spouse: Carmen Wilson (m. 1982)
- Education: Harvard University (BA, JD)
- Profession: Attorney

Karen Marie Freeman-Wilson (born October 24, 1960) is an American attorney, former judge, and politician who served as Indiana Attorney General from 2000 to 2001, as well as mayor of Gary, Indiana from 2012 to 2019. She has been President and CEO of the Chicago Urban League since January 2020.

== Early life and education ==
Freeman-Wilson was born and raised in Gary, Indiana. She earned a Bachelor of Arts degree from Harvard University and Juris Doctor from Harvard Law School.

== Career ==
Freeman-Wilson served as judge of the Gary City Court from 1995 to 2000.

=== Attorney General of Indiana ===
In 2000, she was appointed Indiana Attorney General by Governor Frank O'Bannon to serve the remaining eleven months of the term of Jeff Modisett, who resigned to become Deputy CEO and General Counsel to the Democratic National Convention.

As the incumbent, Freeman-Wilson ran for Indiana Attorney General in 2000 but lost to Republican Steve Carter. State auditors later found that the Freeman-Wilson issued more than $700,000 in grants without approval from the Governor and various agencies during her eleven months in office. The Indiana State Board of Accounts discovered this when it filed the annual audit of this office in 2001. The State Board found that Freeman-Wilson issued grants from the $1.39 million payment Indiana received for work on the national tobacco settlement. A $500,000 grant to the Indiana Minority Health Coalition was also issued without approval from the Governor and agencies under his control. Freeman-Wilson acknowledged, "mistakes were made." In an interview with The Indianapolis Star, she said, "I'm not going to criticize Mr. Carter and I don't think he should criticize me." Attorney General Carter responded, "We can only clean up the office from this point forward."

=== Nonprofit work ===
After leaving office, Freeman-Wilson served as CEO of the nonprofit National Association of Drug Court Professionals, where she helped get a clinical trial of Prometa as a possible treatment for methamphetamine addiction launched in the Gary drug court. (At the time, Hythiam was charging as much as $15,000 for the treatment, with the proceeds split between the prescribing physician and Hythiam, even though there had been neither clinical trials nor FDA approval.) Clinical trials later found Prometa to be an ineffective treatment for addiction. In July 2007, Hythiam Inc., the company that was licensing the Prometa protocol and that was owned by convicted fraudster Terren Peizer, named Freeman-Wilson to its board of directors. Other posts held by Freeman-Wilson include executive director of the National Drug Court Institute and director of the Indiana Civil Rights Commission.

Freeman-Wilson served as legal counsel to the Gary Urban Enterprise Association from 1995 to 2006.

=== Mayor of Gary ===
In April 2011, Rudy Clay announced he was ending his re-election campaign due to prostate cancer, and endorsed Karen Freeman-Wilson as his successor, asking his supporters to vote for her. In May 2011, Freeman-Wilson won the Democratic primary for the mayor of Gary. She had previously run for the post in 2003 and 2007, and had lost to Scott L. King and Rudy Clay, respectively. Given Gary's political tendencies, she was considered a heavy favorite in the general election. She won the election with 87 percent of the vote, becoming the city's first female mayor. Freeman-Wilson and her "New Day" Transition Team developed what they called a “blueprint” for Gary, promising to improve public safety, economic development, and the city's appearance and image.

During her tenure as mayor, Freeman-Wilson appeared in a December 21, 2016, episode of Undercover Boss, in which she was disguised as a long-haired woman from Nashville, Tennessee with a Southern accent. The episode highlighted wage and infrastructure challenges related to Gary's tight budget and allowed the mayor to evaluate ways to improve working conditions. Unlike other episodes, in which bosses tended to provide gifts with the organization's money, she relied on private donations, a personal donation, and strategic budgeting to provide gifts and investments.

Freeman-Wilson was denied a third term when, in the May 2019 mayoral primary, she lost to Lake County Assessor Jerome Prince. Since there were no other contenders on the November general election ballot, Prince officially succeeded her in office on January 1, 2020, two days after he had been sworn in as the city's 21st mayor.

== See also ==
- List of first African-American mayors

Party political offices
Preceded by Jeff Modisett	Democratic nominee for Indiana Attorney General; 2000	Succeeded by Joe Hogsett
Legal offices
Preceded by Jeffrey A. Modisett	Attorney General of Indiana; 2000–2001	Succeeded by Stephen R. Carter
