= Eddie Melton =

American politician (born 1981)

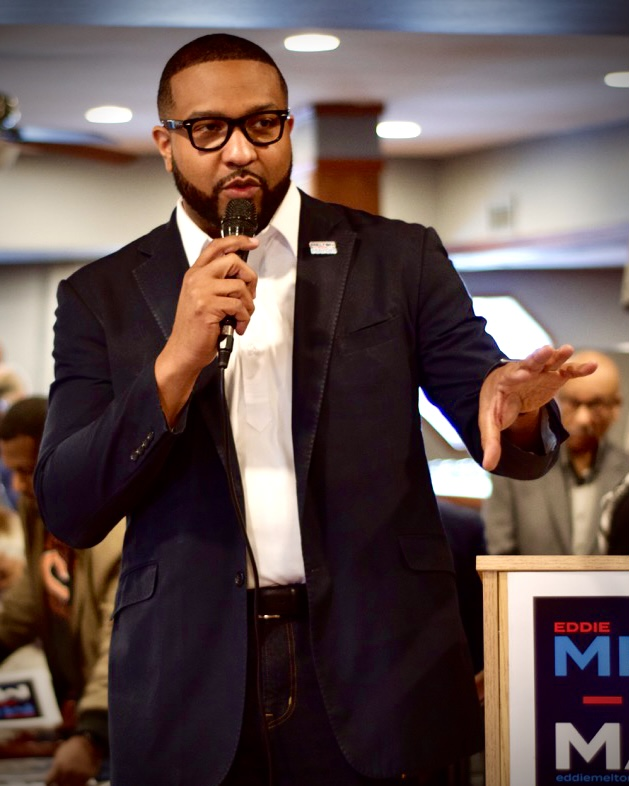
- Melton in 2023

22nd Mayor of Gary, Indiana
- Incumbent
- Assumed office January 1, 2024
- Preceded by: Jerome Prince

Member of the Indiana Senate from the 3rd district
- In office November 9, 2016 – December 5, 2023
- Preceded by: Earline S. Rogers
- Succeeded by: David Vinzant

Personal details
- Born: January 26, 1981 (age 45) Gary, Indiana, U.S.
- Party: Democratic
- Spouse: Crystal
- Education: Calumet College of St. Joseph (BS)

Eddie Melton (born January 26, 1981) is an American politician who has served as the 22nd mayor of Gary, Indiana since 2024. A member of the Democratic Party, he previously served in the Indiana Senate from 2016 to 2023.

== Biography ==
Melton was born and raised in Gary, Indiana, attended Jefferson Elementary, and graduated from Horace Mann High School. He started his secondary education at Kentucky State University, where earned an athletic scholarship to play as a quarterback. During his time at Kentucky State University, he is a member of Kappa Alpha Psi fraternity and studied business management. He later completed it at Calumet College of St. Joseph, graduating with a degree in organizational management. Melton served as Manager of Corporate Citizen and Community Relations for NIPSCO. Melton was a contributor to the National My Brother's Keeper Initiative, which was created by Barack Obama. He served on the Indiana State Board of Education. Melton was elected to the state senate in 2016. In June 2019, he announced his candidacy for Governor of Indiana in the 2020 election, but he ended his candidacy in January 2020. In November 2020, Melton was elected as the Assistant Minority Floor Leader of the Indiana Senate. Melton currently resides in Gary, Indiana, with his wife, Crystal, and their four children.

== Previous jobs ==
=== Early career ===
Eddie Melton began his career in community engagement and social work, focusing on empowering underprivileged communities. He worked for NIPSCO, as a community relations and corporate citizen manager, where he led initiatives to foster stronger ties between the corporation and local communities. His role involved developing partnerships and programs to address educational inequality, workforce development and access to resources to vulnerable populations.

=== State Senate career ===
In November 2016, Melton was elected to the Indiana State Senate, representing District 3, which includes parts of Gary, Indiana and other areas of northwest Indiana. Melton worked with state and local leaders to address issues such as school closures, economic stagnation, and public safety challenges in his district. Known for his bipartisan approach, he focused on securing resources for communities affected by industrial decline.

As a state senator, Melton worked on funding economic and environmental issues in northwest Indiana, including transportation projects and urban redevelopment.

== Mayoral campaign ==
=== 2023 Democratic Primary ===
On November 16, 2022, Melton declared his candidacy for mayor of Gary, Indiana, in the 2023 Democratic Party primary election. Melton was the first to challenge incumbent mayor Jerome Prince. Melton became the main competitor to Prince's reelection bid, criticizing Prince's lack of progress in his term. Melton and Prince ended up being the only two candidates on the Democratic Primary ballot due to disqualifications. On May 2, 2023, Eddie Melton defeated Jerome Prince with over 58% of the vote in the Gary Democratic Primary to win the bid of the Democratic nominee for mayor.

=== Eddie Melton's campaign ===
Melton ran a campaign with the catchphrase “Gary deserves better NOW”. Melton received endorsements from members from The Jackson 5 group, state legislator Earline Rodgers, and singer Deniece Williams, among many union groups.

=== 2023 general election ===
On November 7, 2023, the Gary Indiana general elections were held between Eddie Melton and Republican challenger Andrew Delano. Melton received over 95% of the vote, winning the election. Melton resigned from the State Senate on December 5, 2023, following his election as mayor. On December 30, 2023, Melton was sworn in as the 22nd mayor of Gary Indiana, officially taking office on January 1, 2024.

== Mayor of Gary ==
=== Inauguration ===
Melton was sworn in to office on December 30, 2023, by Lake County Prosecutor, Bernard Carter at West Side Leadership Academy. In his inaugural address, Mayor Melton emphasized the need for change and a forward-looking vision for a "greater Gary."

=== First 100 days ===
Upon taking office on January 1, 2024, Melton announced his 100-day plan titled "Leading Gary to Greatness." The plan focused on nine areas: greater government, public infrastructure environmental and parks, public safety, economic development and redevelopment, education, housing, arts, culture, and tourism, and community engagement.

=== Economic development ===
On March 7, 2024, his administration negotiated with the large local company, Indiana Sugars. The company was looking to expand and perhaps move out of Gary, but with Melton's efforts, Indiana Sugars remained local and purchased 70 more acres in Gary.

In March 2024, Melton's administration received a $3 million donation from Hard Rock Casino Northern Indiana to aid in the demolition of run down and abandoned properties in downtown Gary. Melton also helped Gary Works secure a $300 million investment from Nippon Steel.

=== Public infrastructure ===
In July 2024, Melton announced that the city would be partnering with Notre Dame School of Architecture's Housing and Community Regeneration Initiative to work on rebuilding Gary in order to revitalize the economy and create a better downtown area for residents.

In June 2024, to address concerns of aging infrastructure, Melton introduced the Relight the City program to repair all streetlights in Gary by 2025. The city council allocated $3.5 million to fund the plan. Improved street lighting has been seen to reduce crime rates and road injuries in cities.

In late May 2024 the Melton administration formed a partnership with the Indiana Department of Environmental Management (IDEM) and law enforcement to form an illegal dumping task force. The city also received a half $1 million grant from IDEM to help combat and clean up illegal dumping sites. Melton spoke at a press conference announcing the task force and encouraged residents to use the 311-nonemergency line to report illegal dumping in the city.

== Electoral history ==
2020 Indiana Senate election
Party	Candidate	Votes	%	±%
Democratic	Eddie Melton (incumbent)	38,445	100	
Total votes		38,445	100.0	
Democratic hold				

Democratic primary for the 2023 Gary, Indiana, mayoral election
Party	Candidate	Votes	%
Democratic	Eddie Melton	6,345	58.87
Democratic	Jerome Prince (incumbent)	4,438	41.13
Turnout		10,790	100.00

2023 Gary, Indiana, mayoral election
Party	Candidate	Votes	%	±%
Democratic	Eddie Melton	6,373	95.09	
Republican	Andrew Delano	314	4.69	
Write-in		15	0.22%	
Total votes		6,702	100.0	
Democratic hold				
