= Maintaining a common nuisance =

Maintaining a common nuisance is a legal term for anyone knowingly using or renting out a place for people to make, sell, or use illegal drugs. It can also be used against someone manufacturing or distributing alcohol in an illegal manner at a location.
