= 1992 Indiana Attorney General election =

- November 3, 1992
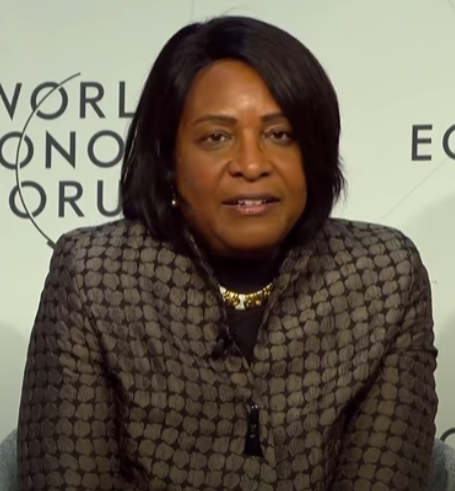

Candidate	Pamela Carter	Timothy L. Bookwalter
Party	Democratic	Republican
Popular vote	1,084,065	1,005,829
Percentage	51.87%	48.13%
- Carter: 50–60% 60–70% Bookwalter: 50–60% 60–70%
Attorney General before election
Linley E. Pearson
Republican
Elected Attorney General
Pamela Carter
Democratic

The 1992 Indiana Attorney General election was held on November 3, 1992, to elect the Indiana Attorney General. Republican incumbent Linley E. Pearson chose not to run for re-election to a fourth term in office, instead unsuccessfully running for governor. Democratic attorney and deputy chief of staff to Governor Evan Bayh Pamela Carter won the election, defeating Republican attorney Timothy L. Bookwalter by three percentage points.

With her victory, Carter became the first Black woman to be elected a state's attorney general.

== General election ==
=== Candidates ===
- Pamela Carter, attorney and deputy chief of staff to Governor Evan Bayh (Democratic)
- Timothy L. Bookwalter, attorney (Republican)

=== Results ===
1992 Indiana Attorney General election results
Party	Candidate	Votes	%	±%
Democratic	Pamela Carter	1,084,065	51.87%	+9.16%
Republican	Timothy L. Bookwalter	1,005,829	48.13%	−9.16%
Total votes		2,089,894	100.00%	
Democratic gain from Republican				
