= 1996 Indiana Attorney General election =

- November 5, 1996
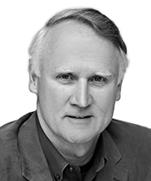

Candidate	Jeff Modisett	Steve Carter
Party	Democratic	Republican
Popular vote	1,029,795	975,699
Percentage	51.35%	48.65%
- Modisett: 50–60% 60–70% Carter: 50–60% 60–70%
Attorney General before election
Pamela Carter
Democratic
Elected Attorney General
Jeff Modisett
Democratic

The 1996 Indiana Attorney General election was held on November 5, 1996, to elect the Indiana Attorney General. Democratic incumbent Pamela Carter chose not to run for a second term. Democratic nominee former Marion County Prosecutor Jeff Modisett won the election by a margin of 2.7 percentage points over Republican attorney and future Indiana Attorney General Steve Carter. As of 2026, this is the last time a Democrat has been elected Indiana Attorney General.

== General election ==
=== Candidates ===
- Jeff Modisett, former Marion County Prosecutor (1991–1994) (Democratic)
- Steve Carter, attorney (Republican)

=== Results ===
1996 Indiana Attorney General election results
Party	Candidate	Votes	%	±%
Democratic	Jeff Modisett	1,029,795	51.35%	−0.52%
Republican	Steve Carter	975,699	48.65%	+0.52%
Total votes		2,005,494	100.00%	
Democratic hold				
