= 1986 Indiana Secretary of State election =

- November 4, 1986
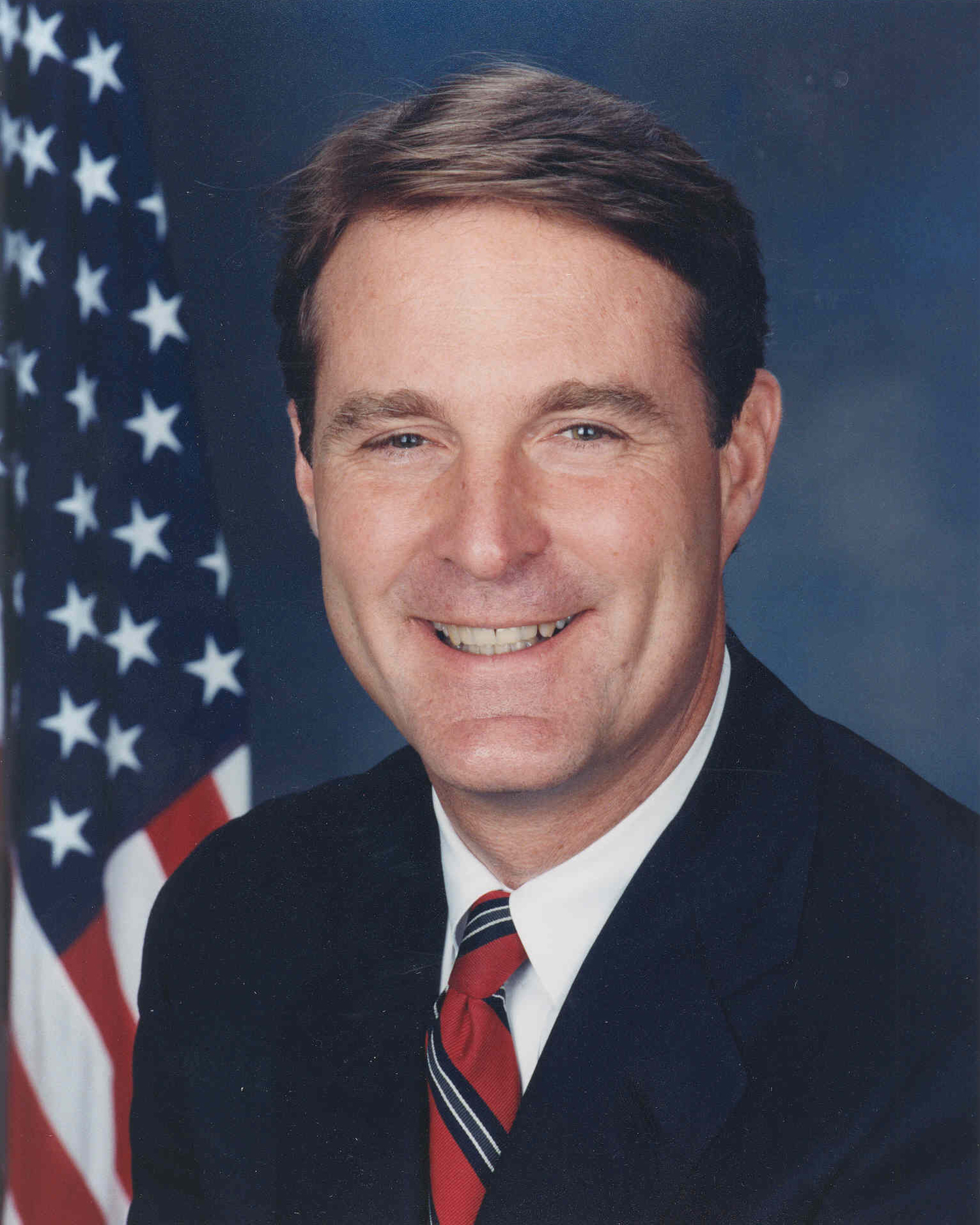

Candidate	Evan Bayh	Robert O. Bowen
Party	Democratic	Republican
Popular vote	828,494	705,963
Percentage	53.28%	45.40%
- County results Bayh: 40–50% 50–60% 60–70% Bowen: 40–50% 50–60% 60–70%
Secretary of State before election
Edwin Simcox
Republican
Elected Secretary of State
Evan Bayh
Democratic

The 1986 Indiana secretary of state election was held on November 4, 1986, to elect the secretary of state of Indiana. Republican incumbent Edwin Simcox did not seek a third term. Democratic attorney Evan Bayh defeated Republican attorney Robert O. Bowen by seven percentage points.

Bayh would not serve out a full term as Secretary of State of Indiana as he would go on to resign in 1989 to take office after winning the 1988 Indiana gubernatorial election.

Forty years after this election, Bayh's son, Beau Bayh, would win election to this office in the 2026 election.

== General election ==
=== Candidates ===
- Evan Bayh, attorney (Democratic)
- Robert O. Bowen, attorney (Republican)
- Linda Patterson (American)
- Karen Benson (Libertarian)

=== Results ===
1986 Indiana Secretary of State election results
Party	Candidate	Votes	%	±%
Democratic	Evan Bayh	828,494	53.28%	+5.21
Republican	Robert O. Bowen	705,963	45.40%	−5.40
American Party of the United States	Linda Patterson	10,208	0.66%	+0.07
Libertarian	Karen Benson	10,174	0.65%	+0.11
Total votes		1,554,839	100.00%	
Democratic gain from Republican				
