= Gary Roberts =

Gary Roberts may refer to:

== Sports ==
=== Association football ===
- Gary Roberts (footballer, born 1960), Welsh football forward and winger
- Gary Roberts (footballer, born 1984), English football attacking midfielder
- Gary Roberts (footballer, born 1987), English football playmaker

=== Other sports ===
- Gary Roberts (American football) (born 1946), American football offensive guard
- Gary Roberts (ice hockey) (born 1966), Canadian ice hockey player

== Others ==
- Gary R. Roberts, Dean of the Indiana University School of Law

== See also ==
- Garry Roberts (1950–2022), Irish guitarist
