= 2004 United States Senate election in Indiana =

- November 2, 2004
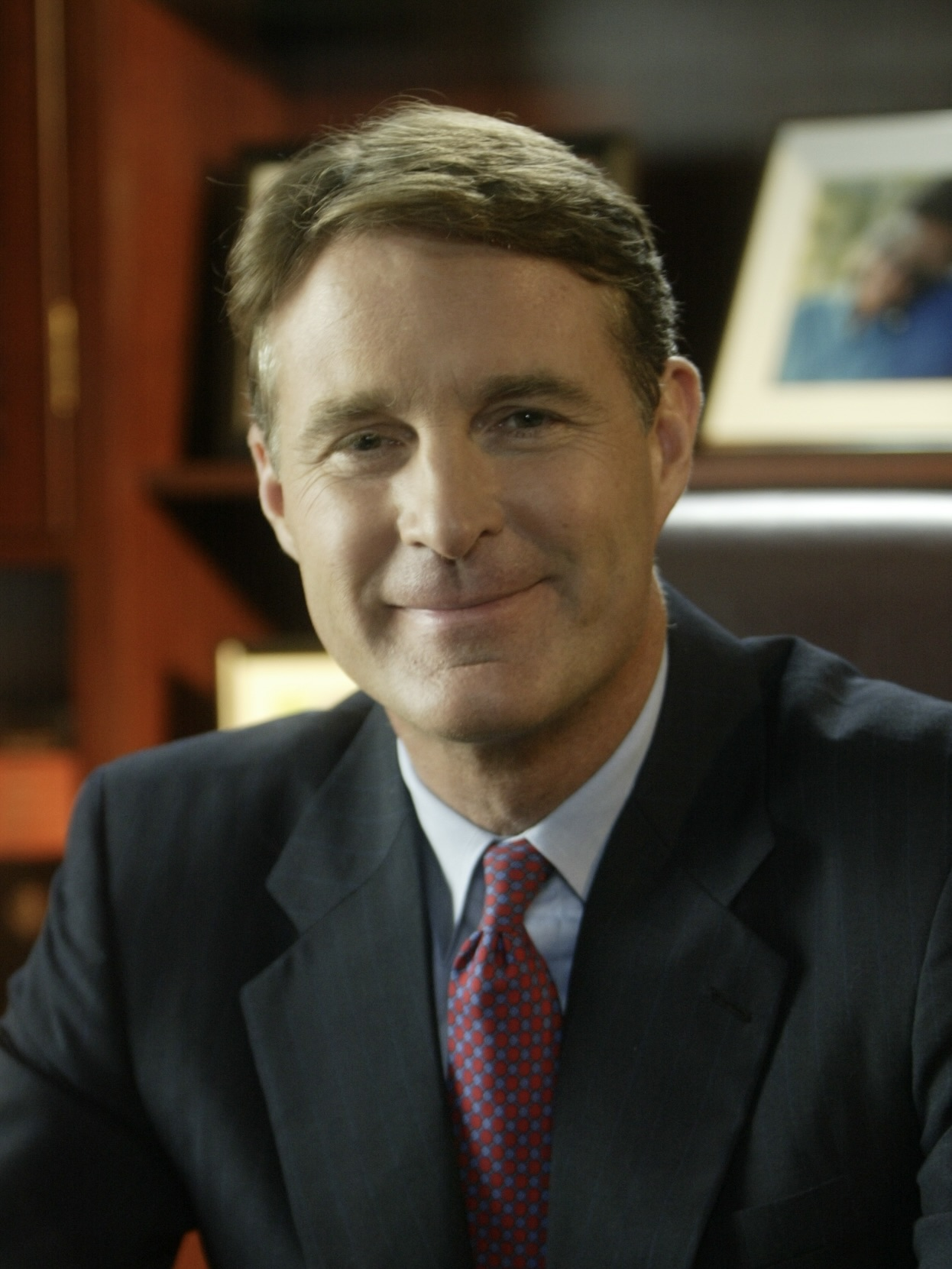

Nominee	Evan Bayh	Marvin Scott
Party	Democratic	Republican
Popular vote	1,496,976	903,913
Percentage	61.65%	37.23%
- County results Bayh: 50–60% 60–70% 70–80% Scott: 40–50% 50–60%
U.S. senator before election
Evan Bayh
Democratic
Elected U.S. Senator
Evan Bayh
Democratic

The 2004 United States Senate election in Indiana was held on November 2, 2004. Incumbent Democratic U.S. Senator Evan Bayh won re-election to a second term by a slightly smaller margin than six years earlier. To date, this was the last time the Democrats have won the Class 3 Senate seat from Indiana. Bayh won 86 of the state's 92 counties.

== Major candidates ==
=== Democratic ===
- Evan Bayh, incumbent U.S. Senator

=== Republican ===
- Marvin Scott, Professor at Butler University and nominee for IN-10 in 1994

== General election ==
=== Campaign ===
In September, Bayh had $6.5 million cash on hand. Scott's strategy of trying to paint Bayh as too liberal failed to gain traction.

In early 2004, Bayh was considered a serious contender for the vice presidency as the running mate of Massachusetts Senator John Kerry. Although Bayh was on the final shortlist, North Carolina Senator John Edwards was ultimately chosen instead.

Bayh easily won reelection, defeating Scott by more than 24 percentage points and carrying all but six counties, even while Kerry lost the state by more than 20 percentage points in the concurrent presidential election.

=== Predictions ===
Source	Ranking	As of
Sabato's Crystal Ball	Safe D	November 1, 2004

=== Polling ===
Poll source	Date(s) administered	Sample size (Note: Key: A – all adults RV – registered voters LV – likely voters V – unclear)	Margin of error	Evan Bayh (D)	Marvin Scott (R)	Other / Undecided
SurveyUSA	October 27–29, 2004	586 (LV)	± 4.0%	61%	34%	5%

=== Results ===
General election results
Party	Candidate	Votes	%
Democratic	Evan Bayh (incumbent)	1,496,976	61.65%
Republican	Marvin Scott	903,913	37.23%
Libertarian	Albert Barger	27,344	1.13%
Total votes		2,428,233	100.0%
Democratic hold			

==== By county ====
Bayh won 86 of Indiana's counties compared to 6 for Scott.

County	Bayh	Votes	Scott	Votes	Barger	Votes	Total
Adams	57.4%	7,551	41.6%	5,476	1.0%	126	13,153
Allen	57.8%	74,011	41.3%	52,845	0.9%	1,126	127,982
Bartholomew	58.4%	16,507	40.4%	11,422	1.1%	316	28,245
Benton	63.0%	2,501	35.3%	1,400	1.7%	69	3,970
Blackford	69.1%	3,694	30.1%	1,609	0.8%	42	5,345
Boone	48.8%	11,074	50.0%	11,343	1.1%	255	22,672
Brown	59.7%	4,336	38.6%	2,803	1.7%	125	7,264
Carroll	59.7%	5,067	39.3%	3,331	1.0%	85	8,483
Cass	56.8%	7,873	42.1%	5,829	1.1%	159	13,861
Clark	62.8%	26,054	36.4%	15,091	0.9%	368	41,513
Clay	64.9%	6,928	34.0%	3,629	1.0%	112	10,669
Clinton	56.3%	6,600	42.8%	5,011	0.9%	108	11,719
Crawford	63.6%	2,832	35.3%	1,572	1.1%	47	4,451
Daviess	56.4%	5,891	42.6%	4,447	1.0%	107	10,445
Dearborn	45.7%	9,264	52.7%	10,675	1.5%	311	20,250
Decatur	61.3%	6,173	37.8%	3,808	0.9%	88	10,069
DeKalb	56.2%	8,529	43.0%	6,523	0.9%	132	15,184
Delaware	69.5%	32,312	29.3%	13,627	1.2%	580	46,519
Dubois	66.2%	11,166	33.0%	5,560	0.8%	136	16,862
Elkhart	51.2%	31,186	47.9%	29,168	0.9%	546	60,900
Fayette	64.0%	5,961	34.5%	3,212	1.4%	134	9,307
Floyd	62.1%	20,898	36.9%	12,412	1.0%	332	33,642
Fountain	60.1%	4,532	39.2%	2,955	0.8%	60	7,547
Franklin	53.5%	5,247	44.8%	4,395	1.7%	171	9,813
Fulton	60.7%	5,264	38.3%	3,324	1.0%	91	8,679
Gibson	69.6%	10,110	29.5%	4,289	0.9%	129	14,528
Grant	61.4%	16,620	37.6%	10,189	0.9%	256	27,065
Greene	64.7%	8,336	34.2%	4,402	1.1%	137	12,875
Hamilton	46.4%	48,001	52.6%	54,408	0.9%	970	103,379
Hancock	52.3%	14,548	46.6%	12,941	1.1%	309	27,798
Harrison	59.0%	10,094	39.9%	6,824	1.1%	180	17,098
Hendricks	48.0%	24,844	51.1%	26,441	0.9%	486	51,771
Henry	62.6%	12,666	36.1%	7,312	1.3%	254	20,232
Howard	58.9%	21,732	40.1%	14,776	1.0%	368	36,876
Huntington	52.8%	8,125	46.2%	7,103	1.0%	160	15,388
Jackson	62.2%	10,071	36.7%	5,944	1.1%	171	16,186
Jasper	49.2%	5,727	49.6%	5,772	1.1%	130	11,629
Jay	63.5%	5,117	35.3%	2,845	1.2%	94	8,056
Jefferson	61.4%	7,794	37.5%	4,764	1.1%	142	12,700
Jennings	60.9%	6,349	37.9%	3,944	1.2%	125	10,418
Johnson	53.2%	27,149	45.8%	23,330	1.0%	506	50,985
Knox	71.5%	11,130	27.5%	4,275	1.0%	155	15,560
Kosciusko	45.7%	12,554	53.0%	14,574	1.3%	369	27,497
LaGrange	54.3%	4,865	44.7%	4,006	1.0%	90	8,961
Lake	71.4%	130,450	27.3%	49,919	1.3%	2,320	182,689
LaPorte	69.7%	28,826	28.3%	11,685	2.0%	840	41,351
Lawrence	52.4%	9,132	46.2%	8,064	1.4%	242	17,438
Madison	64.3%	34,379	34.7%	18,541	1.0%	524	53,444
Marion	66.0%	210,107	33.0%	104,819	1.0%	3,047	317,973
Marshall	57.5%	10,111	41.5%	7,293	1.0%	174	17,578
Martin	66.7%	3,297	32.1%	1,587	1.2%	58	5,058
Miami	54.5%	7,339	44.3%	5,967	1.2%	168	13,474
Monroe	68.9%	33,821	29.3%	14,396	1.8%	880	49,097
Montgomery	59.9%	8,651	39.0%	5,635	1.1%	159	14,445
Morgan	50.1%	12,878	48.7%	12,498	1.2%	313	25,689
Newton	55.7%	3,225	42.7%	2,475	1.6%	91	5,791
Noble	57.0%	8,853	42.0%	6,527	1.0%	160	15,540
Ohio	54.4%	1,572	44.3%	1,282	1.3%	37	2,891
Orange	61.1%	5,056	37.8%	3,127	1.1%	89	8,272
Owen	60.5%	4,538	38.0%	2,851	1.5%	114	7,503
Parke	65.9%	4,480	33.0%	2,249	1.1%	78	6,807
Perry	71.6%	5,790	27.6%	2,234	0.8%	62	8,086
Pike	69.8%	4,209	29.3%	1,765	1.0%	59	6,033
Porter	63.9%	39,876	34.3%	21,411	1.9%	1,159	62,446
Posey	69.0%	8,052	30.2%	3,523	0.8%	88	11,663
Pulaski	59.1%	3,328	39.7%	2,236	1.2%	65	5,629
Putnam	59.1%	7,683	39.9%	5,185	1.0%	134	13,002
Randolph	61.9%	6,625	36.8%	3,943	1.2%	133	10,701
Ripley	53.3%	6,212	45.3%	5,282	1.4%	168	11,662
Rush	58.7%	4,316	40.2%	2,962	1.1%	83	7,361
Saint Joseph	70.0%	75,340	29.2%	31,372	0.8%	886	107,598
Scott	70.7%	6,070	28.3%	2,435	1.0%	85	8,590
Shelby	56.7%	8,986	42.4%	6,717	0.9%	136	15,839
Spencer	65.7%	6,495	33.6%	3,317	0.7%	74	9,886
Starke	67.8%	6,108	30.6%	2,762	1.6%	142	9,012
Steuben	58.7%	7,447	40.0%	5,070	1.3%	169	12,686
Sullivan	73.6%	6,072	25.4%	2,099	1.0%	79	8,250
Switzerland	59.6%	2,148	38.9%	1,404	1.5%	53	3,605
Tippecanoe	63.5%	32,766	34.9%	18,002	1.6%	837	51,605
Tipton	58.5%	4,557	40.4%	3,142	1.1%	87	7,786
Union	54.6%	1,777	43.6%	1,417	1.8%	58	3,252
Vanderburgh	67.6%	46,088	31.2%	21,242	1.2%	817	68,147
Vermillion	78.0%	5,468	21.1%	1,480	0.9%	66	7,014
Vigo	75.3%	29,828	23.5%	9,307	1.2%	492	39,627
Wabash	51.6%	6,853	47.5%	6,313	0.8%	111	13,277
Warren	61.1%	2,357	37.7%	1,454	1.2%	48	3,859
Warrick	62.2%	15,572	37.0%	9,260	0.8%	205	25,037
Washington	58.4%	6,270	40.1%	4,304	1.5%	156	10,730
Wayne	58.5%	16,081	39.4%	10,821	2.1%	584	27,486
Wells	53.5%	6,532	45.7%	5,583	0.8%	103	12,218
White	64.4%	6,667	34.6%	3,589	1.0%	108	10,364
Whitley	55.6%	7,405	43.3%	5,761	1.1%	146	13,312

==== Counties that flipped from Democratic to Republican ====
- Dearborn (largest city: Lawrenceburg)
- Jasper (largest city: Rennselaer)

== See also ==
- 2004 United States Senate elections
- 2004 United States House of Representatives elections in Indiana
- 2004 United States presidential election in Indiana
