= Lawrence W. Inlow Hall =

Academic hall in Indianapolis, Indiana, U.S.

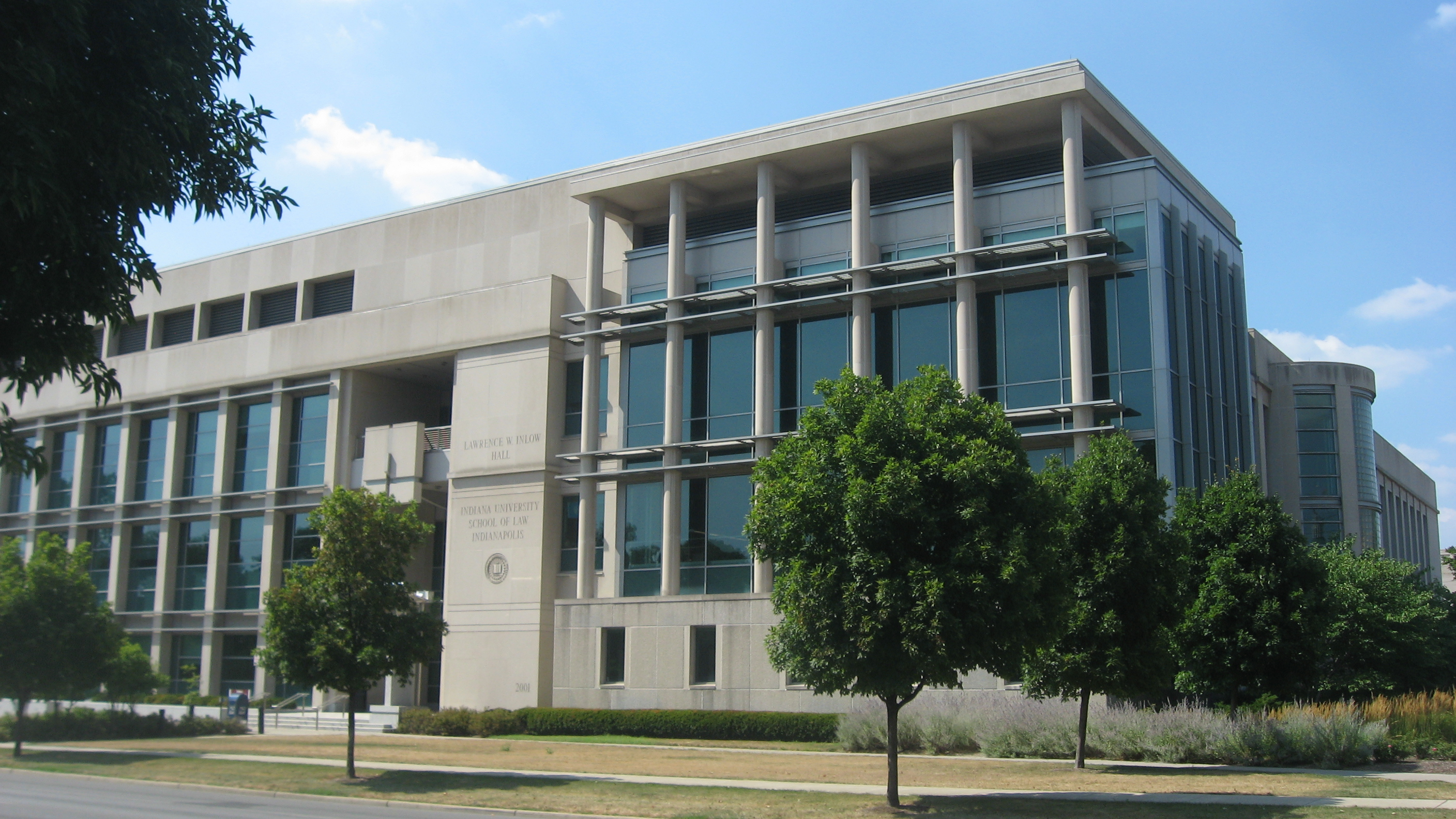
- Lawrence W. Inlow Hall in 2011

General information
- Location: 530 W. New York St., Indianapolis, Indiana, U.S. 46202-3225
- Coordinates: 39°46′19.416″N 86°10′4.364″W
- Named for: Lawrence W. Inlow
- Groundbreaking: 1998
- Completed: 2001
- Affiliation: Indiana University-Purdue University Indianapolis

Design and construction
- Architecture firm: KCF-SHG Inc. and Ratio/Smith Group

The Lawrence W. Inlow Hall is home to the Indiana University Robert H. McKinney School of Law in Indianapolis, Indiana, United States. and forms part of the gateway to the Indianapolis campus on the east side. Inlow Hall matches the aesthetic glass and limestone architecture of the Information & Communications Technology Complex to form a distinct entrance. The law school building is located across from Military Park and east of the Sidney & Lois Eskenazi Hall.

== History ==
Inlow Hall was constructed in 2001 and designed by KCF-SHG Inc. and Ratio/Smith Group. The groundbreaking ceremony for the new 17,000-square-foot law school building was in the summer of 1998. The new three-story building contained a large law library and atrium. Initial construction began in the summer of 1999 and was estimated to cost $36 million. Donors for the construction included Anita C. Inlow with a gift of $5 million, Ruth Lilly with a gift $2 million specifically for the Ruth Lilly Library, John and Barbara Wynne with a gift of $1 million which led to the naming of a new courtroom/auditorium, and the Eli Lilly & Company with a gift of $800,000 which led to a naming opportunity.

In 2020, IU alumnus Steve Tuchman and Reed Bobrick donated $4 million to the Indiana University Robert H. McKinney School of Law for the creation of an endowed scholarship and an endowed professorship. To honor this gift, the atrium in the law school building was named the Steve Tuchman and Reed Bobrick Atrium.

== Namesake ==
Inlow Hall is named after Lawrence W. Inlow, a former attorney involved greatly in the Indianapolis community until his death. Anita C. Inlow, widow of Lawrence W. Inlow, former executive vice president and general counsel of Conseco, Inc., gifted $5 million to the construction of the new building, and Indiana University, subsequently, chose to name the building Lawrence W. Inlow Hall in 2001. Lawrence W. Inlow was a graduate of Harvard Law School.

== Ruth Lilly Law Library ==
The Ruth Lilly Law Library contains over 200,000 materials for students that cover a variety of law subsets. Ruth Lilly donated $2 million during the construction of Inlow Hall to expand the existing library as it moved from Eskenazi Hall. In 2011, the library also renovated the reserve room into a research commonplace to promote a more collaborative environment that allowed multiple users at a time. The renovation began in 2010 and was finished at the end of 2011. The library expanded its art installation to include artwork by Harry A. Davis from the Maennerchor Building. The watercolor rendering of the Maennerchor Building was placed in the new research commons following its opening. One of the study rooms on the third floor of the library displayed a pen and ink sketch of the 1970 law school building by artist Harry Mohler, and a pencil view of the Maennerchor Building by William A. Mahler on the second floor. These pieces were donated by local attorney and law school alumni, John Kautzman in 2010.

== Research centers ==
=== William S. and Christine S. Hall Center for Law and Health ===
The Center for Law and Health was established in 1987, with the mission of conducting research on health care law in Indiana. The Center was first announced by, then Vice President, Gerald Bepko is his State of the Campus speech on January 7, 1988. The center was ranked among the top 10 by U.S. News in 2004. It houses the Indiana Health Law Review.

== See also ==
- Indiana University–Purdue University Indianapolis Public Art Collection
- IU Robert H. McKinney School of Law: IUPUI
