= Indiana University School of Law =

Indiana University School of Law may refer to either of two independent law schools operated by the Indiana University system, namely:

- Indiana University Maurer School of Law (IU Maurer), located on the campus of Indiana University Bloomington
- Indiana University Robert H. McKinney School of Law (IU McKinney), located on the campus of Indiana University – Purdue University Indianapolis
