= Theodore L. Sendak =

American politician (1918–1999)

36th Attorney General of Indiana
- In office January 13, 1969 – January 12, 1981
- Governor: Edgar Whitcomb; Otis Bowen
- Preceded by: John J. Dillon
- Succeeded by: Linley E. Pearson

Personal details
- Born: March 16, 1918 Chicago, Illinois, US
- Died: January 22, 1999 (aged 80) Indianapolis, Indiana, US
- Party: Republican
- Education: Harvard University (AB); Valparaiso University (LLB)

Theodore Lorraine Sendak (March 16, 1918 – January 22, 1999) was an American politician who served as the thirty-sixth Attorney General of Indiana from January 13, 1969, to January 12, 1981.

== Early life, education, and military service ==
Sendak was born to Annette and Jack Sendak in Chicago, Illinois. Sendak grew up in East Chicago, Indiana. Sendak attended Harvard University, graduating in 1941.

In 1941, during the Second World War, Sendak was drafted into the United States Army and served in the Philippines. After the war, Sendak remained active in the Army Reserve.

After the war, Sendak began working for the Indiana Department of Veteran Affairs. He returned to school, graduating in 1958 from Valparaiso University Law School.

== Political career ==
Sendak was involved with many local and national campaigns for Republican candidates. In 1968, Sendak was elected Indiana Attorney General, succeeding Democrat John J. Dillon. Sendak served as Attorney General in the administration of Republican Governors Edgar Whitcomb and Otis Bowen. As Attorney General, Sendak advocated against revisions to the state's criminal code and supported the use capital punishment in Indiana. From 1977 to 1978, Sendak served as president of the National Association of Attorneys General. Sendak was succeeded to the office of Attorney General by Linley E. Pearson.

== Personal life and death ==
Sendak married Tennessee Read in 1941. They had three children.

In 1997, Sendak published an autobiography, A Pilgrimage Through the Briar Patch: Fifty Years of Hoosier Politics.

Sendak died of heart failure on January 22, 1999, in Indianapolis, Indiana, at age 80.

== Publications ==
- Theodore L. Sendak (1997). A Pilgrimage Through the Briar Patch: Fifty Years of Hoosier Politics. Indiana: Guild Press of Indiana. ISBN 1578600073.

Party political offices
Preceded by Edwin K. Steers	Republican nominee for Indiana Attorney General; 1968, 1972, 1976	Succeeded by Linley E. Pearson
Political offices
Preceded by John J. Dillon	Indiana Attorney General; 1969-1981	Succeeded by Linley E. Pearson
