= John J. Dillon (politician) =

Indiana Attorney General, 1965–1969

35th Indiana Attorney General
- In office January 11, 1965 – January 13, 1969
- Governor: Roger D. Branigin
- Preceded by: Edwin K. Steers
- Succeeded by: Theodore L. Sendak

John J. Dillon Jr. (1926 – June 21, 1983) was an American lawyer and politician who served as the thirty-fifth Indiana Attorney General from January 11, 1965, to January 13, 1969.

== Biography ==
=== Early life and education ===
Dillon attended and graduated from Xavier University in Cincinnati, Ohio. Dillon then attended the Indiana University Robert H. McKinney School of Law, graduating in 1952.

Dillon served in Air Force during the Second World War. He later became a major general in the Indiana National Guard. In 1964, Dillon traveled with other members of the Indiana National Guard for two weeks of field training in Puerto Rico.

=== Political career ===
Dillon was very active within the Indiana Democratic Party. He held various positions within the state party and was a chairman of the Indiana Young Democrats.

Dillon served as Indianapolis City Attorney from 1956 to 1965.

Dillon was the Democratic nominee in the race for Indiana Attorney General in 1960, but was defeated by incumbent Edwin K. Steers. Dillon was the nominee for state AG in the 1964 race and won in a rematch against Steers. Dillon served in the administration of Democratic Governor Roger D. Branigin. As attorney general, Dillon helped to pass and implement new abandoned property laws, assisted in interstate highway construction, and enforced state anti-trust laws. Future U.S. Attorney and prominent state politician Virginia Dill McCarty served as assistant attorney general under Dillon. Despite speculation that Dillon would run for governor in 1968, he instead sought re-election, but was defeated. Dillon was succeeded to the office by Theodore L. Sendak.

=== Personal life and death ===
Dillon was Catholic.

Dillon's son, John J. Dillon III, was a lawyer and was appointed by Governor Evan Bayh to serve as commissioner of the Indiana Department of Insurance in 1989.

Dillon was the director of the Indianapolis Legal Aid Society. He was also a member of the Indianapolis Bar Association, the Indiana State Bar Association, and the American Bar Association.

Dillon died of a heart attack in 1983 while at a training encampment at Camp Grayling, Michigan.

Party political offices
Preceded by William H. Wolf	Democratic nominee for Indiana Attorney General; 1960, 1964, 1968	Succeeded by Theodore D. Wilson
Political offices
Preceded by Edwin K. Steers	Indiana Attorney General; 1965–1969	Succeeded by Theodore L. Sendak
