= Adele Storck =

German-American lawyer (1874–1960)

Adele Ida Storck
- Born: June 1874; Kassel, Germany
- Died: August 26, 1960 (aged 86)
- Education: University of Chicago; Bachelor of Laws degree from Benjamin Harrison Law School
- Occupation: Lawyer
- Known for: First woman entered into the Indianapolis Bar Association
- Parents: Albert Storck (father); Bertha Limper (mother)

Adele Ida Storck (June 1874 – August 26, 1960) was a lawyer and German-born immigrant to the United States, who became the second woman to graduate from Benjamin Harrison Law School, and the first to enter the Indianapolis Bar Association..

== Early life ==
Storck was born in Kassel, Germany in June 1874. Her exact date of birth is not known. Her parents, Albert and Bertha Storck, immigrated to the U.S. with her sometime between 1881 and 1883, when Storck was 8 years old. Her father ran a hardware business in Odell, IL. Storck remained in Illinois throughout her initial college education.

== Career ==
Storck graduated from the University of Chicago with an unknown undergraduate degree. She moved to Indianapolis in 1900, teaching German in public schools. She took classes at DePauw University before enrolling into Benjamin Harrison Law School, now the Indiana University Robert H. McKinley School of Law. Storck graduated from Benjamin Harrison Law School in 1921 with a degree in law, one of two of the first women graduated from the school in this year. Storck was awarded top honors for her senior thesis. Storck started a law firm with Minnie Elizabeth Mason, the first woman to graduate from Benjamin Harrison Law School. This was the first women's law firm in Indiana, Storck & Mason. Storck was later accepted into the Indianapolis Bar Association, the first woman to do so. She was an executive committee member of the National Women Lawyers’ Association, and later a vice president in 1924.

Storck attended the Women's Safety Driving Contest in 1923, being one of the 8 top drivers. She wrote two books in her life; Flag Makers, published in 1925 and Broken Chords, published in 1952.

She died on August 26, 1960, and is buried in Crown Hill, Indiana.
