= Cleon H. Foust =

American lawyer and politician (1907–2003)

32nd Indiana Attorney General
- In office January 6, 1947 – January 6, 1949
- Governor: Ralph F. Gates
- Preceded by: James Emmert
- Succeeded by: J. Emmett McManamon

Personal details
- Born: 1907 Columbia City, Indiana, U.S.
- Died: 2003 (aged 95–96)
- Resting place: Crown Hill Cemetery and Arboretum Sec 78, Lot 257
- Education: Harvard University (BA); University of Arizona (JD)

Cleon H. Foust (1907–2003) was an American lawyer and politician who served as the thirty-second Indiana Attorney General from January 6, 1947, to January 6, 1949. Foust also served as Dean of the Indiana University School of Law – Indianapolis from 1967 to 1973.

== Biography ==
=== Early life and education ===
Foust was born in Columbia City, Indiana.

Foust graduated from Columbia City High School. He obtained his bachelor's degree from Wabash College in Crawfordsville in 1927. He studied at Harvard University in Cambridge, Massachusetts before entering the University of Arizona Law School in Tucson, where he obtained his J.D. in 1933.

Foust practiced law in Columbia City for five years, before moving to Indianapolis.

=== Legal, political, and educational career ===
In 1941, Foust became an associate professor at the Drake University School of Law in Des Moines, Iowa. In 1944, Foust joined the faculty of the Indiana University School of Law – Indianapolis (today known as the Indiana University Robert H. McKinney School of Law). Foust taught on substantive criminal law and torts.

In 1943, Indiana Attorney General James Emmert appointed Foust (a Republican) to the office of Deputy Attorney General. In 1945, Foust became First Deputy AG. In 1947, Emmert resigned as Attorney General after being elected to serve on the Indiana Supreme Court. Governor Ralph F. Gates appointed Foust to the office of Attorney General in 1947 to serve out the rest of Emmert's term. Foust ran for re-election in 1948, but lost to Democrat J. Emmett McManamon.

After serving as Attorney General, Foust continued to teach at the Indiana University School of Law – Indianapolis. In 1967, Foust became the law school's Dean, succeeding Ben F. Small. He resigned as Dean in 1973. He was succeeded by William F. Harvey.

=== Personal life and death ===
Foust was a member of Phi Beta Kappa, Lambda Chi Alpha, and Phi Delta Phi. He also served as chairman of the Indiana Young Republicans in 1944.

Foust died in 2003 and is buried at Crown Hill Cemetery.

Political offices
Preceded by James Emmert	Indiana Attorney General; 1947-1949	Succeeded by J. Emmett McManamon
