= Pamela Carter (Indiana politician) =

American politician (born 1949)

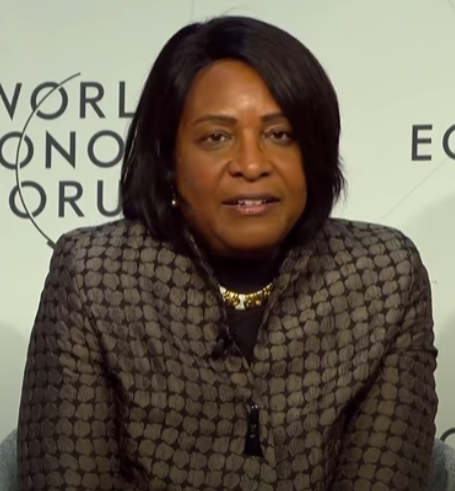
- Speaking at the 2023 World Economic Forum

38th Indiana Attorney General
- In office January 13, 1993 – January 16, 1997
- Governor: Evan Bayh
- Preceded by: Linley E. Pearson
- Succeeded by: Jeff Modisett

Personal details
- Born: Pamela Lynn Fanning; August 20, 1949 (age 77) South Haven, Michigan, U.S.
- Party: Democratic
- Education: University of Detroit, University of Michigan, Indiana University School of Law
- Profession: Attorney

Pamela Lynn Carter (née Fanning; born August 20, 1949) is an American lawyer, politician, and business executive. She was the first black woman to serve as a state's attorney general. She served as Indiana Attorney General from 1993 to 1997.

== Career ==
Pamela Carter attended the University of Detroit, graduating with a bachelor's degree in social work and pre-law. She later earned an M.S.W. degree from the University of Michigan and a J.D. degree from the Indiana University School of Law.

Carter worked as trial attorney specializing in consumer protection and joined the legal services of the United Auto Workers. Carter worked as an enforcement attorney for Indiana's secretary of state and as deputy chief of staff to Democratic Indiana Governor Evan Bayh, helping to reform health and human services in the state. Carter ran for Indiana Attorney General in 1992. Carter ran against Republican Timothy Bookwalter (a public defender from Putnam County), with Carter defeating him with fifty-two percent of the vote. Carter succeeded Linley E. Pearson to the office and served as Attorney General in the administration of Governor Bayh. Carter was succeeded to the office by Jeff Modisett.

She is the first African-American woman elected as a state's attorney general. Carter is also the first African American and the first woman attorney general in Indiana's history. In Indiana, Carter is only the second African American elected to statewide office.

In 1995, she was included on Ebony′s list of "100 Most Influential Black Americans."

Carter served as the vice president of manufacturing firm Cummins, and president of its Distribution Business unit from 2008 to May 2015. She has been a member of the board of directors of Hewlett Packard Enterprise since 2015.

== See also ==
- List of female state attorneys general in the United States

Party political offices
Preceded by John Rumple	Democratic nominee for Indiana Attorney General; 1992	Succeeded by Jeff Modisett
Legal offices
Preceded by Linley E. Pearson	Attorney General of Indiana; 1993–1997	Succeeded by Jeff Modisett
