= J. Emmett McManamon =

American politician

33rd Attorney General of Indiana
- In office January 10, 1949 – January 12, 1953
- Governor: Henry F. Schricker
- Preceded by: Cleon H. Foust
- Succeeded by: Edwin K. Steers

Personal details
- Born: March 1, 1905 Indianapolis, Indiana, U.S.
- Died: August 5, 1954 (aged 49) Indianapolis, Indiana
- Party: Democratic

James Emmett "Red" McManamon (March 1, 1905 – August 5, 1954) was an American politician and judge who served as the Attorney General of Indiana from 1949 to 1953.

== Biography ==
McManamon graduated from the Indiana University Maurer School of Law in Bloomington in 1934. McManamon served as a judge of the Speedway Magistrate Court. He also served as director of the Indiana Council of Fraternal and Social Societies.

McManamon, a Democrat, was elected Indiana Attorney General in 1948, succeeding Cleon H. Foust. McManamon served in the administration of Democratic Governor Henry F. Schricker. McManamon was defeated for re-election and succeeded by Republican Edwin K. Steers.

At age 49, McManamon died of a heart attack in a taxi cab.

Political offices
Preceded by Cleon H. Foust	Indiana Attorney General; 1949-1953	Succeeded by Edwin K. Steers
