= Lawrence Jegen =

Jegen leads here. For airport in Bosnia Herzegovina, see Tuzla Jegen Lug Airport

Lawrence A. Jegen III (November 16, 1934 – May 17, 2018) was the Thomas F. Sheehan Professor of Tax Law and Policy at the Indiana University Robert H. McKinney School of Law. He received a B.A. in philosophy and literature from Beloit College in 1956, a J.D. (1959) and an M.B.A. in accounting (1960) from the University of Michigan, and an LL.M. in tax law from New York University in 1963.

He joined the faculty in 1962 as an assistant professor and was promoted to full professor in 1964. Among numerous honors, he has twice received the Thomas Hart Benton Mural Medallion from Indiana University, its highest award, in 1993 and 2005, and three times the Sagamore of the Wabash Award for humanity in living, wisdom and counsel, and inspiration and leadership from governors of Indiana, in 1980, 1988 and 1997. In 2006 the Lawrence A. Jegen III Professorship was created and funded at Indiana University Foundation by Michael D. McCormick, which professorship is to be awarded to an active scholar and teacher at the Indiana University Robert H. McKinney School of Law in Indianapolis.
