= Marvin Scott =

American politician and academic

Marvin Bailey Scott (born March 10, 1944) is an American politician and university professor at Butler University in Indianapolis, Indiana. He is nationally known for his involvement in school desegregation cases, figuring in five federal desegregation cases (in the Boston School desegregation case as a Court Appointed Expert). He currently serves on the Regional and Local Council of the Boy Scouts of America. . Scott ran for political office several times as a Republican.

== Early life and family ==
Scott was born in Henderson, North Carolina. He earned his bachelor's degree from Johnson C. Smith University in Psychology, with one year of studies at the University of Allahabad, Uttar Pradesh India, and his Master's and Doctorate of Philosophy (1970) from the University of Pittsburgh. He is married with four children.

== Career ==
Scott was a program officer for Higher Education at Lilly Endowment, President of Saint Paul's College, and Assistant to the Chancellor for the Board of Regents for the Commonwealth of Massachusetts. At Boston University, he was the W. E. B. DuBois Lecturer, Professor, Associate Dean of Education, and Assistant to the Provost and President. Scott spent one year as special assistant to the President of the University of Massachusetts system and as an adjunct professor, during which time he was also an American Council on Education (ACE) Fellow.

Scott works for Butler University teaching sociology, specifically issues concerning race. He has served as special assistant to the President, Assistant Dean of Graduate Studies in the School of Education, Professor of Education in the College of Education, and Professor and Chair of the Sociology and Criminology Department. Scott was a member of the Professional Standards Committee at Butler.

Scott was nominated by President George W. Bush and was affirmed by the United States Senate to serve on the National Council for the Humanities. On one occasion, he chaired the Digital Humanities Committee, where he regularly served as a member. He served on the Indianapolis Waterworks Board and during his last year of service as its president until April 2012. He served as the governor's appointee to the Mid-West Interstate Passenger Rail Commission until September 2012. Scott is an active lifelong board member on the Crossroads of America Council, Boy Scouts of America. Scott served on the board of directors for the Indianapolis City Theater. At St. Paul's College, located in Lawrenceville, Virginia, Scott created a program for single parents and their children, which received national acclaim.

Scott was selected as a president participant in the Christian A. Johnson Leadership Seminars and the Johnson Foundation. In Naples, he served as director of the Boston University overseas education program. He has traveled and spoken nationally and internationally. Scott also served as a consultant to Gulf Oil in Africa.

He has been awarded the Paul Revere Patriots Award by the governor of the Commonwealth of Massachusetts, the Silver Beaver Award for distinguished service to the Boy Scouts of America, and an Honorary Doctorate of Law Degree from Martin University. Scott was also President of Saint Paul's College for two years, Assistant Chancellor of the Board of Regents for the Commonwealth of Massachusetts for five years, Assistant to the Provost, and Associate Dean and Professor at Boston University for eleven years.

== Desegregation activism ==
Scott played a prominent role in numerous cases involving the desegregation of U.S. public schools, including the Morgan v. Hennigan Boston desegregation case of 1974. As the Associate Dean of the School of Education at Boston University, Scott, along with Robert Dentler, then Dean of the School of Education at Boston University, was appointed as a sociological expert. He was appointed to help Judge W. Arthur Garrity to assist in the Boston Public Schools desegregation plan. Scott played a primary role in the desegregation plan, which became paramount in the civil rights struggle within U.S. public education. Scott and Dentler coauthored Schools on Trial, a book published in 1981 about the case and their role in it. In the book, they state, "Desegregation has been achieved in Boston. Quality integrated education will take longer."

Scott also acted as the arbitrator/negotiator in the Bronson v. Cincinnati Board of Education case from December 1983 to February 1984, which desegregated public schools in Cincinnati, Ohio.

Scott co-chaired on the Community Desegregation Advisory Council (CDAC) of Indianapolis in 1990, with seven area superintendents, Judge S. Hugh Dillin and CDAC members. In this council, he was directly involved in school desegregation for the Indianapolis Public Schools system.

In the September 1991 to December 1992 case Christopher Armstrong et al. v. The Board of Trustees of Clark County in Las Vegas, Nevada, Scott served as an expert witness. In this trial, he played a key role in the desegregation of the Clark County School District of Las Vegas.

Scott served as an expert witness in the Robert Anthony Reed v. James Rhodes and Cleveland Board of Education, which desegregated the Cleveland Public Schools. Within this context, he worked with Tom Atkins, who was the lead attorney for the NAACP Legal Defense Fund. He also served as a consultant to the Cleveland Public Schools Review of Pupil Assignments between January 1985 and May 1988.

Scott was an appointed court exported to the King County, Ohio School District Desegregation case from July 7, 2006-July 2010.

== Political career ==
In 1994, Scott ran for the US House of Representatives in the Indiana 10th Congressional District against incumbent Andrew Jacobs Jr.. Scott lost the election but got 47.5% of the overall vote in the district. He lost by 7,575 votes.

In 2004, Scott ran for the United States Senate in Indiana against incumbent Evan Bayh. Although he lost, he garnered nearly a million votes, coming to 37.2%.

In 2010, Scott ran as a Republican for the US House of Representatives in the Indiana 7th Congressional District against incumbent Andre Carson. Scott lost the election in the historically Democratic district, but won 44% of the vote against Carson.

Scott is a member of Kappa Alpha Psi, Phi Delta Kappa, Alpha Kappa Mu, Alpha Kappa Delta, and Phi Kappa Phi.

For seven years, he served as a talk show host on WRKO, Boston, Massachusetts, and at radio outlets WPLZ, Richmond, Virginia, and WHNC, Henderson, North Carolina.

== Articles and Publications ==
- "Patriotic Speech and Symbolism in Black and White Churches as an Indicator of Value Assimilation among Voluntary versus Involuntary Immigrants"
- "Culture and Religion: Are Reconciliation and Church Integration Possible Among Black and White Christians"
- "Affirmative Action into the Twenty-First Century: Revision and Survival"
- "The Effect of Teacher Perception of Personality Factors on the Cognitive and Affective Learning of black Students"
- "Playing at Affirmative Action"
- "Acceptance of Minority Student Personality Characteristics by Black and White Teachers"
- Authored a chapter in "The Future of Big City Schools: Desegregation Policies and Magnet Alternatives"

He co-authored several books:

- "The Essential Profession: Contemporary Issues in Education"
- "Five Essential Dimensions of Curriculum Design: A Handbook for Teachers"
- "Schools on Trial, An Inside Account of the Boston Desegregation Case"

Scott's latest research for publication was in Evansville, IN before the Indiana Academy of Social Sciences," Ruling by Court on Segregation is Opposed Here: School Desegregation Evasion and Compliance in Vance County, North Carolina", October 9, 2015.

Party political offices
Preceded by Paul Helmke	Republican nominee for U.S. Senator from Indiana (Class 3); 2004	Succeeded by Dan Coats
