= John Lawrence Hill =

American philosopher and law professor

- Born: 1960 (age 65–66)
- Occupation: Professor of Law

John Lawrence Hill (born 1960) is an American philosopher and law professor.

Hill obtained a J.D. and Ph.D. in philosophy from Georgetown University. In 2003, he joined the Indiana University Robert H. McKinney School of Law where he is currently R. Bruce Townsend Professor of Law and adjunct professor of philosophy. He has published articles in the Cornell Law Review, Georgetown Law Journal, Iowa Law Review and the New York University Law Review.

Hill supports animal rights and is a vegetarian. In 1996, he authored The Case for Vegetarianism which gives both deontological and utilitarian arguments for vegetarianism.

His book Political Centrist (2009) defends a centrist approach to political issues. In 2016, Hill authored After the Natural Law: How the Classical Worldview Supports Our Modern Moral and Political Values which argues that legal, moral and political principles such as freedom, human dignity and personal responsibility require a foundation in natural law.

His latest book, The Father of Modern Constitutional Liberalism argues that John Stuart Mill is the father of modern constitutional liberalism and examines his influence on constitutional rights. Hill is a published member on Law and Liberty.

== Selected publications ==
- The Enlightened Society (Theosophical Publishing House, 1987)
- The Case for Vegetarianism: Philosophy for a Small Planet (Rowman & Littlefield, 1996)
- The Political Centrist (Vanderbilt University Press, 2009)
- After the Natural Law: How the Classical Worldview Supports Our Modern Moral and Political Views (Ignatius Press, 2016)
- The Prophet of Modern Constitutional Liberalism: John Stuart Mill and the Supreme Court (Cambridge University Press, 2020)
