= Edwin Simcox =

American politician

55th Secretary of State of Indiana
- In office December 1, 1978 – December 1, 1986
- Governor: Otis Bowen; Robert D. Orr
- Preceded by: Larry Conrad
- Succeeded by: Evan Bayh

Personal details
- Born: January 12, 1945 (age 80); La Porte, Indiana
- Political party: Republican

Edwin Simcox (born January 12, 1945) is an American politician who served as the Secretary of State of Indiana from 1978 to 1986. In 2004, the Indiana General Assembly commissioned the name of the “Edwin J. Simcox Overpass over US Highway 35 in La Porte, Indiana.

Party political offices
Preceded by William L. Allen III	Republican nominee for Secretary of State of Indiana; 1978, 1982	Succeeded by Robert Bowen
