= 1998 United States Senate election in Indiana =

- November 3, 1998
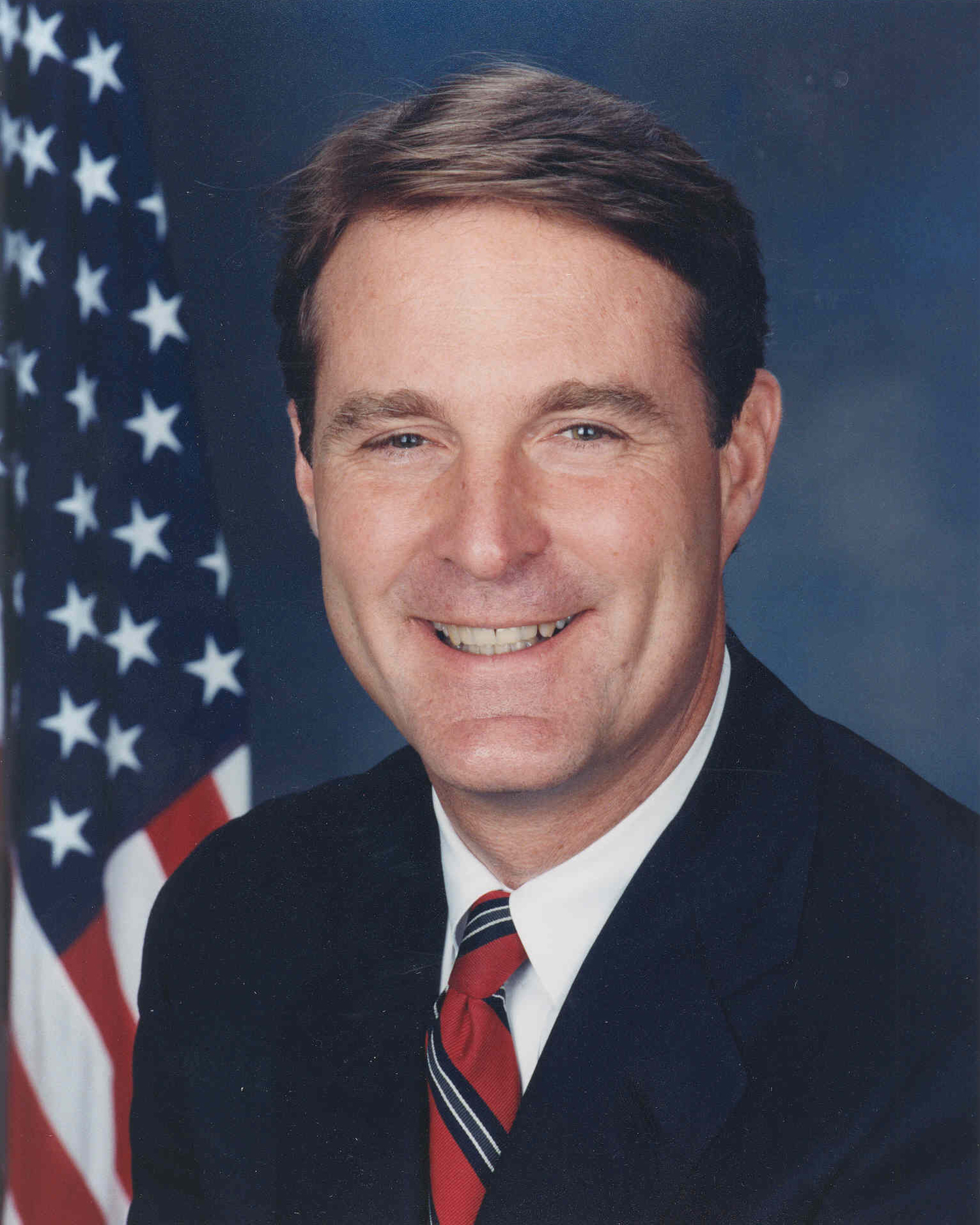

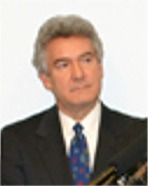
Nominee	Evan Bayh	Paul Helmke
Party	Democratic	Republican
Popular vote	1,012,244	552,732
Percentage	63.72%	34.79%
- County results Bayh: 50–60% 60–70% 70–80% 80–90% Helmke: 40–50% 50–60%
U.S. senator before election
Dan Coats
Republican
Elected U.S. Senator
Evan Bayh
Democratic

The 1998 United States Senate election in Indiana was held November 3, 1998. Republican incumbent Dan Coats decided to retire instead of seeking a second full term in office. Democratic former governor Evan Bayh won the open seat his father once held.

Coats was later returned to the seat in the 2010 election.

== General election ==
=== Candidates ===
- Evan Bayh, former governor of Indiana (Democratic)
- Paul Helmke, mayor of Fort Wayne (Republican)
- Rebecca Sink-Burris (Libertarian)

=== Polling ===
Poll source	Date(s)	Sample size (Note: Key: A – all adults RV – registered voters LV – likely voters V – unclear)	Margin of error	Paul Helmke (R)	Evan Bayh (D)	Other / undecided (Note: Calculated by taking the difference of 100% and all other candidates combined.)
Harris Insights & Analytics	October 30, 1998	977	—	33%	64%	3%
Mason-Dixon Polling & Strategy	October 25–27, 1998	819 (LV)	± 3.5%	33%	58%	9%
Harris Insights & Analytics	October 20, 1998	831	—	27%	63%	10%
Mason-Dixon Polling & Strategy	September 11–13, 1998	814 (LV)	± 3.5%	32%	55%	13%
Mason-Dixon Polling & Strategy	July 25–27, 1998	803 (LV)	± 3.5%	31%	53%	16%

=== Results ===
General election results
Party	Candidate	Votes	%
Democratic	Evan Bayh	1,012,244	63.72%
Republican	Paul Helmke	552,732	34.79%
Libertarian	Rebecca Sink-Burris	23,641	1.49%
Total votes		1,588,617	100.0%
Democratic gain from Republican			

==== Results by county ====
Bayh won 88 of Indiana's counties compared to 4 for Helmke.

County	Bayh	Votes	Helmke	Votes	Sink-Burris	Votes	Total
Adams	60.5%	6,407	37.8%	4,011	1.7%	185	10,603
Allen	53.5%	41,037	44.5%	34,183	2.0%	1,496	76,716
Bartholomew	60.9%	11,937	37.7%	7,383	1.4%	275	19,595
Benton	62.2%	2,019	36.1%	1,172	1.7%	54	3,245
Blackford	67.4%	2,916	31.2%	1,348	1.4%	60	4,324
Boone	48.7%	6,267	49.6%	6,377	1.7%	215	12,859
Brown	64.6%	3,670	33.5%	1,903	1.9%	107	5,680
Carroll	62.4%	3,987	36.6%	2,340	1.0%	63	6,390
Cass	60.5%	7,454	38.0%	4,691	1.5%	184	12,329
Clark	71.8%	18,747	27.1%	7,090	1.1%	291	26,128
Clay	73.2%	6,099	25.7%	2,137	1.1%	95	8,331
Clinton	58.5%	4,859	40.1%	3,332	1.4%	113	8,304
Crawford	70.0%	2,673	28.2%	1,075	1.8%	70	3,818
Daviess	62.8%	5,056	36.3%	2,918	0.9%	75	8,049
Dearborn	57.1%	6,650	40.4%	4,704	2.5%	286	11,640
Decatur	63.5%	4,372	35.4%	2,434	1.1%	79	6,885
DeKalb	57.3%	5,217	41.1%	3,736	1.6%	145	9,098
Delaware	67.4%	23,142	31.3%	10,758	1.3%	458	34,358
Dubois	71.2%	8,623	26.4%	3,199	2.4%	292	12,114
Elkhart	51.9%	17,863	47.1%	16,238	1.0%	334	34,435
Fayette	71.9%	5,717	26.9%	2,137	1.2%	99	7,953
Floyd	68.1%	15,150	30.7%	6,832	1.2%	261	22,243
Fountain	65.4%	4,143	33.5%	2,125	1.1%	70	6,338
Franklin	64.4%	3,817	33.9%	2,014	1.7%	100	5,931
Fulton	66.9%	4,751	31.6%	2,248	1.5%	107	7,106
Gibson	73.2%	8,265	25.8%	2,914	0.9%	107	11,286
Grant	61.9%	13,067	37.1%	7,829	1.0%	212	21,108
Greene	71.5%	8,002	27.4%	3,062	1.1%	123	11,187
Hamilton	42.4%	18,793	56.2%	24,948	1.4%	611	44,352
Hancock	54.8%	9,135	43.7%	7,303	1.5%	244	16,682
Harrison	69.4%	8,245	28.9%	3,430	1.7%	200	11,875
Hendricks	46.8%	11,458	52.0%	12,757	1.2%	301	24,516
Henry	66.2%	10,029	32.6%	4,954	1.2%	176	15,159
Howard	63.6%	15,811	35.0%	8,686	1.4%	347	24,844
Huntington	52.8%	5,412	45.8%	4,692	1.4%	144	10,248
Jackson	68.2%	8,557	30.7%	3,856	1.1%	144	12,557
Jasper	56.2%	3,764	42.5%	2,850	1.3%	90	6,704
Jay	64.3%	4,202	34.2%	2,240	1.5%	96	6,538
Jefferson	64.9%	6,134	25.9%	2,450	9.2%	865	9,449
Jennings	63.8%	4,507	34.6%	2,448	1.6%	110	7,065
Johnson	55.0%	15,965	43.5%	12,637	1.5%	422	29,024
Knox	74.5%	9,101	24.6%	3,003	0.9%	108	12,212
Kosciusko	48.1%	8,423	49.9%	8,750	2.0%	342	17,515
LaGrange	58.1%	3,715	40.6%	2,596	1.3%	81	6,392
Lake	78.0%	80,073	20.9%	21,429	1.1%	1,139	102,641
LaPorte	71.2%	21,495	27.5%	8,304	1.3%	386	30,185
Lawrence	61.2%	7,967	37.3%	4,850	1.5%	201	13,018
Madison	69.6%	29,134	29.4%	12,317	1.0%	426	41,877
Marion	60.9%	122,830	37.5%	75,688	1.6%	3,329	201,847
Marshall	59.6%	6,504	39.5%	4,310	0.9%	97	10,911
Martin	69.7%	2,624	29.1%	1,099	1.2%	44	3,767
Miami	57.6%	5,689	40.4%	3,993	2.0%	195	9,877
Monroe	66.2%	19,044	30.8%	8,845	3.0%	862	28,751
Montgomery	56.2%	5,062	42.5%	3,835	1.3%	113	9,010
Morgan	55.1%	9,056	43.3%	7,109	1.6%	271	16,436
Newton	65.5%	2,654	32.2%	1,306	2.3%	94	4,054
Noble	58.8%	6,014	39.5%	4,046	1.7%	171	10,231
Ohio	59.6%	1,208	37.5%	760	2.9%	58	2,026
Orange	64.2%	4,343	33.8%	2,293	2.0%	134	6,770
Owen	67.7%	3,625	30.4%	1,632	1.9%	101	5,358
Parke	71.4%	4,192	27.4%	1,611	1.2%	71	5,874
Perry	76.2%	4,218	22.9%	1,265	0.9%	49	5,532
Pike	74.0%	3,883	24.5%	1,284	1.5%	79	5,246
Porter	69.6%	26,219	28.9%	10,890	1.5%	557	37,666
Posey	73.9%	6,870	24.9%	2,316	1.2%	116	9,302
Pulaski	62.6%	2,853	36.0%	1,641	1.4%	62	4,556
Putnam	61.5%	5,706	37.0%	3,437	1.5%	138	9,281
Randolph	61.3%	4,351	37.3%	2,643	1.4%	101	7,095
Ripley	61.2%	5,105	37.7%	3,149	1.1%	96	8,350
Rush	64.0%	4,051	34.5%	2,184	1.5%	92	6,327
Saint Joseph	68.3%	47,214	30.7%	21,229	1.0%	667	69,110
Scott	75.2%	4,492	23.9%	1,428	0.9%	55	5,975
Shelby	62.4%	7,201	36.3%	4,186	1.3%	155	11,542
Spencer	69.0%	5,121	30.4%	2,253	0.6%	48	7,422
Starke	71.7%	5,127	26.4%	1,892	1.9%	135	7,154
Steuben	55.3%	4,204	42.5%	3,237	2.2%	166	7,607
Sullivan	79.0%	5,565	19.7%	1,387	1.3%	90	7,042
Switzerland	67.7%	1,847	31.2%	851	1.1%	30	2,728
Tippecanoe	60.1%	20,293	38.6%	13,025	1.3%	452	33,770
Tipton	62.3%	3,517	36.3%	2,051	1.4%	78	5,646
Union	60.7%	1,451	37.2%	889	2.1%	51	2,391
Vanderburgh	71.5%	36,558	27.3%	14,010	1.2%	590	51,158
Vermillion	82.2%	4,195	16.5%	842	1.3%	65	5,102
Vigo	76.6%	22,070	22.2%	6,415	1.2%	337	28,822
Wabash	55.1%	4,739	44.0%	3,781	0.9%	78	8,598
Warren	67.0%	2,324	31.6%	1,095	1.4%	50	3,469
Warrick	70.8%	11,889	28.0%	4,700	1.2%	194	16,783
Washington	65.7%	5,282	28.5%	2,289	5.9%	472	8,043
Wayne	63.5%	12,704	35.3%	7,068	1.2%	247	20,019
Wells	56.6%	5,146	41.9%	3,806	1.5%	137	9,089
White	68.3%	5,791	30.5%	2,592	1.2%	103	8,486
Whitley	58.9%	5,586	38.8%	3,680	2.3%	222	9,488

Counties that flipped from Republican to Democratic

- Delaware
- Porter
- Madison
- Spencer
- Starke
- Tippecanoe
- Vanderburgh
- Blackford
- Marion
- Monroe
- Knox
- Pike
- Posey
- Warrick
- Adams
- Allen
- Bartholomew
- Benton
- Brown
- Carroll
- Cass
- Clay
- Clinton
- Daviess
- Dearborn
- Jasper
- Decatur
- DeKalb
- Dubois
- Elkhart
- Fayette
- Fountain
- Franklin
- Fulton
- Grant
- Greene
- Hancock
- LaPorte
- Henry
- Howard
- Huntington
- Jackson
- Jay
- Jennings
- Johnson
- LaGrange
- Lawrence
- Marshall
- Martin
- Miami
- Montgomery
- Morgan
- Newton
- Noble
- Ohio
- Orange
- Owen
- Parke
- Pulaski
- Putnam
- Randolph
- Ripley
- Rush
- St. Joseph
- Shelby
- Steuben
- Tipton
- Union
- Wabash
- Warren
- Washington
- Wayne
- Wells
- White
- Whitley

== See also ==
- 1998 United States Senate elections
