= 1992 Indiana gubernatorial election =

- November 3, 1992
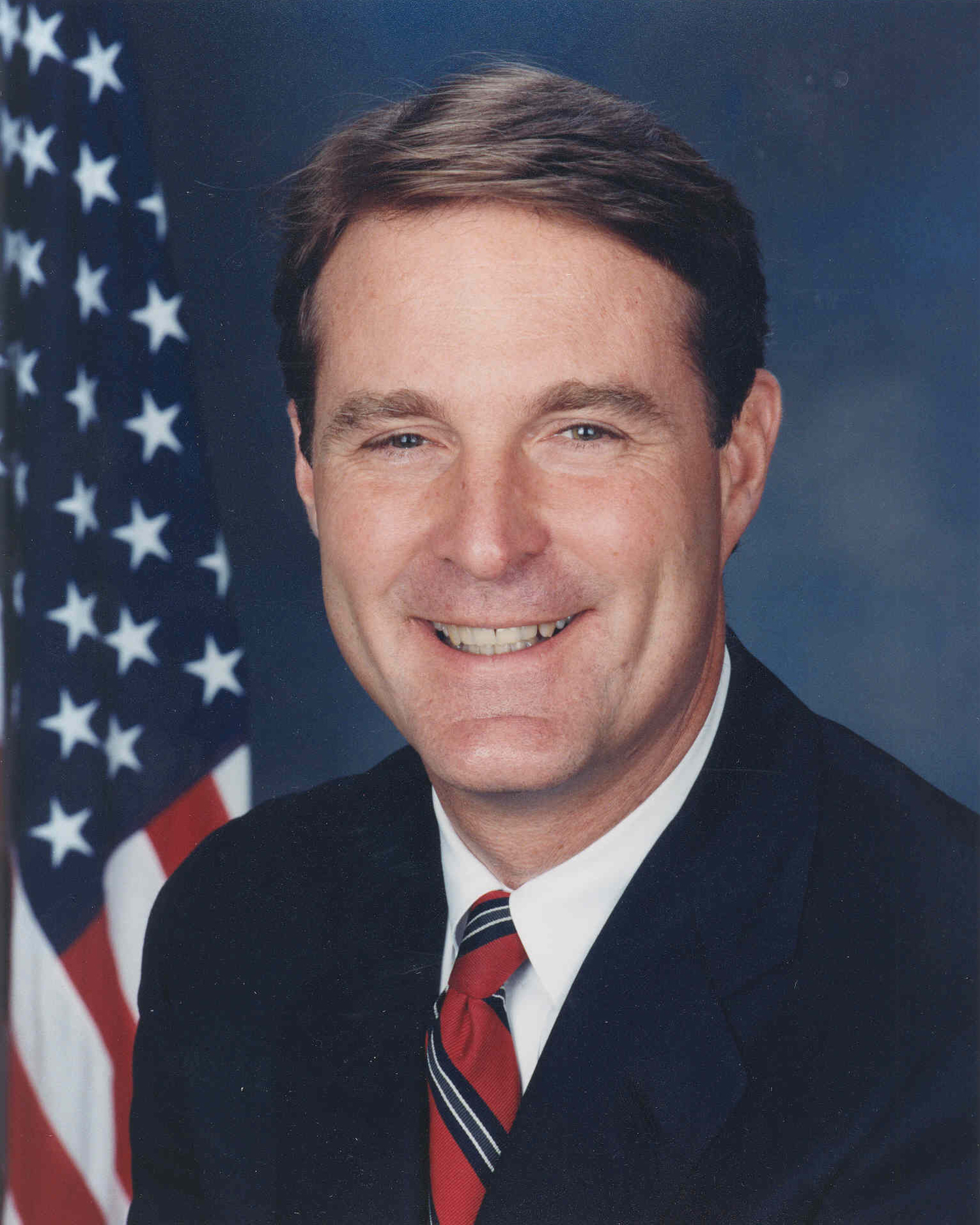

Nominee	Evan Bayh	Linley E. Pearson
Party	Democratic	Republican
Running mate	Frank O'Bannon	Robert D. Green
Popular vote	1,382,151	822,533
Percentage	62.01%	36.90%
- County results Bayh: 50–60% 60–70% 70–80% Pearson: 40–50% 50–60%
Governor before election
Evan Bayh
Democratic
Elected Governor
Evan Bayh
Democratic

The 1992 Indiana gubernatorial election was held on November 3, 1992. Incumbent Governor Evan Bayh, a Democrat, won reelection over his Republican challenger, Linley E. Pearson with 62% of the vote, despite the fact that George H. W. Bush carried Indiana by 6 points in the concurrent presidential election. He was the first Democratic governor of Indiana to win reelection since governors became eligible for election to consecutive terms in office in 1972.

Bayh carried all but two counties (Clinton and Jasper). As of 2025, this would be the last occasion that the following counties have voted Democratic in a gubernatorial election: Boone, Daviess, Elkhart, Hamilton, Hendricks, Huntington, Johnson, Kosciusko, Lawrence, Miami, Morgan, Union, Wabash, and Wells.

== Primaries ==
=== Democratic ===
Incumbent Governor Evan Bayh was unopposed in the Democratic primary.

Democratic primary results
Party	Candidate	Votes	%
Democratic	Evan Bayh (incumbent)	298,478	100.00
Total votes		298,478	100.00

=== Republican ===
Candidates

- Linley E. Pearson, Indiana Attorney General
- H. Dean Evans, State Superintendent of Public Instruction
- John A. Johnson, former Republican nominee for Congress in the 5th District

Republican primary results
Party	Candidate	Votes	%
Republican	Linley E. Pearson	223,373	48.9
Republican	H. Dean Evans	153,089	33.5
Republican	John A. Johnson	80,784	17.7
Total votes		457,246	100.00

=== Minor parties ===
==== New Alliance ====
The New Alliance Party nominated Mary Barton to be its gubernatorial candidate in 1992. Elmetta Wellington became the nominee for lieutenant governor.

== General election ==
Bayh won the election with 62% of the popular vote to Pearson's 37%. Bayh's total in the popular vote was the largest in recent history.

Indiana gubernatorial election, 1992
Party	Candidate	Votes	%
Democratic	Evan Bayh (incumbent)	1,382,151	62.01
Republican	Linley E. Pearson	822,533	36.90
New Alliance	Mary Barton	24,378	1.09
Total votes		2,229,062	100.00
Democratic hold			
