= Gary R. Roberts =

11th President of Bradley University
- In office January 2016 – May 2020
- Preceded by: Joanne Glasser
- Succeeded by: Stephen Standifird

Personal details
- Education: Bradley University (BA); Stanford University (JD)

Gary R. Roberts is a former President of Bradley University in Peoria, Illinois, and is also a former Dean of the Indiana University Robert H. McKinney School of Law and Gerald L. Bepko Professor of Law. Roberts earned his Bachelor of Arts degree from Bradley and his J.D. from Stanford University in 1970 and 1975 respectively.

== Career ==
After completing his legal studies, Roberts clerked for Ben C. Duniway on the United States Court of Appeals for the Ninth Circuit in San Francisco. In 1976, he entered private practice in Washington, D.C., with the firm of Covington & Burling specializing in sports law. In 1983, he became a faculty member at Tulane Law School in New Orleans and eventually was named the Deputy Dean, Sumter Davis Marks Professor of Law and Sports Law Program Director.

Since 1987, Roberts has been on the board of directors for the Sports Lawyer Association and has since edited a monthly sports newsletter and the publication of the Sports Lawyers Journal. He served as president of the association from 1995 through 1997.

As a practitioner of sports law, his clients have included major sports leagues and associations, teams, players, and coaches in the U.S. and England.

Roberts joined the Indiana University Robert H. McKinney School of Law as dean in July 2007.

In October 2015 Roberts announced that he will return to his alma mater of Bradley University to assume the position of president of the university starting January 1, 2016.

== Controversy ==
In December 2016, when asked how his administration responded to an alleged sexual assault on the campus of Bradley University, Roberts responded:

"We investigated it thoroughly. A lot of these incidents, like this one, involve students who knew each other who got very drunk. Um, teenage kids sometimes behave in stupid ways and that's basically what happened this time. But we've investigated it thoroughly and have taken appropriate steps. We have to put out a campus safety alert when something like happened happened and that causes public alarm, but it really was just an unfortunate incident involving some students that didn't behave very well."

After his initial statement was criticized for not recognizing sexual assault as criminal activity and being dismissive of survivors of sexual assault, Roberts later indicated a desire to "take back my ill-considered comments."

In May 2018, Roberts penned an opinion piece advocating against revoking an honorary degree granted by Bradley University to Bill Cosby after Cosby was convicted of three counts of aggravated indecent assault, acts Roberts described as "horrible behavior".
