= Indiana Health Law Review =

- Discipline: Health law
- Language: English

Publication details
- History: 2004-present
- Publisher: Indiana University Robert H. McKinney School of Law (United States)
- Frequency: Biannually

Standard abbreviations
- ISO 4: Indiana Health Law Rev.

Indexing
- ISSN: 1549-3199
- LCCN: 2004212209
- OCLC no.: 54703225

Links
- Journal homepage; Online tables of contents

The Indiana Health Law Review is a biannual student-edited law review at Indiana University Robert H. McKinney School of Law in the United States. Its primary focus is health law and related topics including bioethics, medical malpractice issues, managed care, competition law, health care organizations, medical-legal research, legal medicine, food and drug issues, and other current health-related legal topics.
