= Linley E. Pearson =

American politician

Linley Pearson
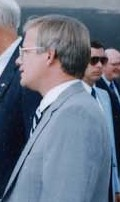

37th Attorney General of Indiana
- In office January 12, 1981 – January 11, 1993
- Governor: Robert D. Orr; Evan Bayh
- Preceded by: Theodore L. Sendak
- Succeeded by: Pamela Carter

Personal details
- Born: April 18, 1946 (age 79); Long Beach, California, U.S.
- Political party: Republican
- Education: The Citadel (BS); Butler University (MBA); Indiana University, Indianapolis (JD)

Linley E. Pearson (born April 18, 1946) is an American politician, lawyer, and judge who served as the thirty-seventh Attorney General of Indiana from January 12, 1981, to January 11, 1993.

== Biography ==
Pearson was born in Long Beach, California. Pearson attended The Citadel (a senior military college in Charleston, South Carolina). Pearson obtained a master's degree from Butler University and a J.D. from Indiana University. Pearson is a former law clerk of Richard M. Givan, a Justice of the Indiana Supreme Court.

Pearson, a resident of Frankfort, was elected Prosecutor of Clinton County in 1971. Pearson is a Republican. When he was first elected, he was the youngest prosecutor in the state. He served as Prosecutor until 1980, when he was elected Indiana Attorney General, defeating Democratic challenger Robert Webster (an attorney from Indianapolis). Pearson succeeded Theodore L. Sendak to the office and served as Attorney General in the administrations of Governors Robert D. Orr (a Republican) and Evan Bayh (a Democrat). Pearson was succeeded to the office by Pamela Carter, a Democrat.

Pearson was the Republican candidate in the 1992 Indiana gubernatorial election, losing the race to incumbent Governor Evan Bayh.

Pearson became Judge for the Clinton County Circuit Court in 1994, after he defeated the incumbent, Jack O'Neill, in the Republican primary. He left in December 2012.

In an interview with The Indiana Lawyer in 2021, Pearson criticized Indiana Attorney General Todd Rokita.

Party political offices
Preceded by Theodore L. Sendak	Republican nominee for Attorney General of Indiana; 1980, 1984, 1988	Succeeded by Timothy Bookwalter
Preceded by John Mutz	Republican nominee for Governor of Indiana; 1992	Succeeded by Stephen Goldsmith
Political offices
Preceded by Theodore L. Sendak	Attorney General of Indiana; 1981–1993	Succeeded by Pamela Carter
