= Jeff Modisett =

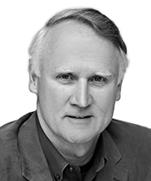

Attorney General of Indiana
- In office 1997–2000
- Governor: Frank O'Bannon
- Preceded by: Pamela Carter
- Succeeded by: Karen Freeman-Wilson

Prosecutor of Marion County
- In office 1991–1994
- Preceded by: Stephen Goldsmith
- Succeeded by: Scott Newman

Personal details
- Education: University of California, Los Angeles (BA); Yale Law School (JD); University of Oxford (MA)

Jeffrey A. Modisett (born August 1954) is a former attorney general of Indiana and county prosecuting attorney of Marion County, Indiana who has worked as an independent legal consultant and CEO of a global legal referral network. He is currently a Special Counsel with a boutique law firm in California.

== Early life ==
Modisett received a B.A. from the University of California, Los Angeles summa cum laude. He then received a J.D. from Yale Law School. He also received a M.A. from the University of Oxford as a Marshall Scholar in 1978.

== Career ==
=== State Attorney's offices ===
Modisett was attorney general for the State of Indiana (1996–2000), Marion County (IN) Prosecuting Attorney (1991–1994), and Deputy Chief of the Public Corruption & Government Fraud Section of the U.S. Attorney's Office for the Central District of California (1982–88).

Elected as Indiana attorney general in November 1996, Modisett became involved in two national efforts: the states' legal battle against the country's top cigarette manufacturers and the investigation of the sweepstakes industry.

He was a member of the 1997 states' negotiating team that reached a preliminary settlement, the Master Settlement Agreement with the tobacco industry, which called for historic changes in the conduct of tobacco advertising in the United States. He was chairman of the 1998 Allocation Committee, which was responsible for devising a formula for distributing the $205 billion settlement to each of the participating states and territories.

In 1998 and 1999, Modisett helped lead the state's effort to reform the sweepstakes industry to better protect consumers, especially the elderly. He was voted one of the top lawyers in Indiana by Indianapolis Monthly magazine and, more recently, one of California's "Superlawyers" by Los Angeles and Law & Politics magazines.

As Marion County Prosecutor he led the investigation and prosecution of the former heavyweight boxing champion Mike Tyson. Other major prosecutions include U.S. v. Althea Flynt (wife of Hustler Magazine publisher; assault).

Modisett was Chairman of the Governor's Commission for a Drug-Free Indiana (1989–2000), and the Governor's Council of Impaired and Dangerous Driving (1989–2000). He also served as President of the Family Advocacy Center (Marion County, Ind.) (1991–1994), and the Hoosier Alliance Against Drugs (1993–95).

=== Corporate ===
Modisett resigned his position of attorney general in 2000 to become the Deputy CEO & General Counsel of the 2000 Democratic National Convention in Los Angeles and co-CEO of TechNet, a political lobbying organization. Modisett was the Chief Legal Officer (2011–15) at LOYAL3, a fintech company in San Francisco that provided a technology platform for online consumer stock ownership and that created the Social IPO to allow everyday Americans to invest in IPOs at the same price as the big Wall St. banks.

=== Current ===
Modisett was recently the CEO of Nextlaw Global Referral Network LLC, a free, non-exclusive legal referral network, and Sr. Counsel at the international law firm of Dentons. He recently joined the Santa Monica, CA office of Sullivan & Triggs, where he serves as an advisor to Fortune 500 and high-technology companies on a number of issues, including antitrust, consumer protection, privacy and political relationships. Modisett specializes in resolving complex legal problems prior to litigation and has worked as an independent consultant specializing in state and federal government relations. He also works as a Lecturer in Law at UCLA Law teaching The Legal & Political Importance of the State Attorneys General.

== Publications and lectures ==
- "Prosecuting Mike Tyson: Boxing with the Media," Ethnographies of Law and Social Control: Sociology of Crime, Law and Deviance, Vol. 6, pp. 145–163 (ed., Dr. S. L. Burns) 2005;
- "The States and Gaming: A Brief Look at the Past, Present, and Future Through the Eyes of a Former Attorney General," 6 Gaming Law Review 197, 2002;
- "Cyberlaw and E-Commerce: A State Attorney General’s Perspective," 94 Northwestern L. Rev. 642, 2000; and "Discovering the Impact of the 'New Federalism' on State Policy Makers: A State Attorney General's Perspective," 32 Ind. L. Rev. 141, 1998.
- In 1999, he was the McGovern Lecturer at Ball State University, where he spoke on "The Ethics of Tobacco Lawyering: Evaluating the Hunter and the Hunted," April 13, 1999.

== See also ==
- Bryan Cave LLP

Party political offices
| Preceded by Pamela Carter | Democratic nominee for Indiana Attorney General; 1996 | Succeeded by Karen Freeman-Wilson |
Legal offices
| Preceded by Stephen Goldsmith | Prosecutor of Marion County; 1991–1994 | Succeeded by Scott Newman |
| Preceded by Pamela Carter | Attorney General of Indiana; 1997–2000 | Succeeded by Karen Freeman-Wilson |
