= Edwin K. Steers =

American politician

34th Attorney General of Indiana
- In office January 12, 1953 – January 11, 1965
- Governor: George N. Craig; Harold W. Handley; Matthew E. Welsh
- Preceded by: J. Emmett McManamon
- Succeeded by: John J. Dillon

Personal details
- Born: January 19, 1915 Indianapolis, Indiana, U.S.
- Died: November 30, 1992 (aged 77) Indianapolis, Indiana
- Party: Republican

Edwin K. Steers (January 19, 1915 – November 30, 1992) was an American politician who served as the Attorney General of Indiana from 1953 to 1965. He also served as a U.S. prosecutor at the Nuremberg trials and the Belsen trial following the Second World War.

== Biography ==
Steers graduated from the Indiana University Maurer School of Law in Bloomington. He was admitted to the bar in 1937.

In 1943, Steers joined the United States Navy and served in the Second World War and the Korean War. After V.E. Day, Steers was a naval representative to the State Department's War Crimes office and became involved with the prosecution of Nazi war criminals. He served as a U.S. special prosecutor at the Nuremberg trials and at the Belsen trial in Lüneburg.

Steers served as deputy prosecutor of Marion County from 1947 to 1948. Steers served as Indiana Attorney General from 1953 to 1965 in the administrations of Governors George N. Craig, Harold W. Handley, and Matthew E. Welsh. He lost his re-election bid in 1964 to Democrat John J. Dillon.

Steers was a Shriner, and in 1956 he served as potentate of the Murat Shrine Temple in Indianapolis. Steers was also a Scottish Rite Freemason and a member of the Beta Theta Pi and Phi Delta Phi fraternities.

Political offices
Preceded by J. Emmett McManamon	Indiana Attorney General; 1953-1965	Succeeded by John J. Dillon
