= Indiana University Robert H. McKinney School of Law =

Law school in Indianapolis, Indiana, US

Coordinates: 39°46′20″N 86°10′04″W

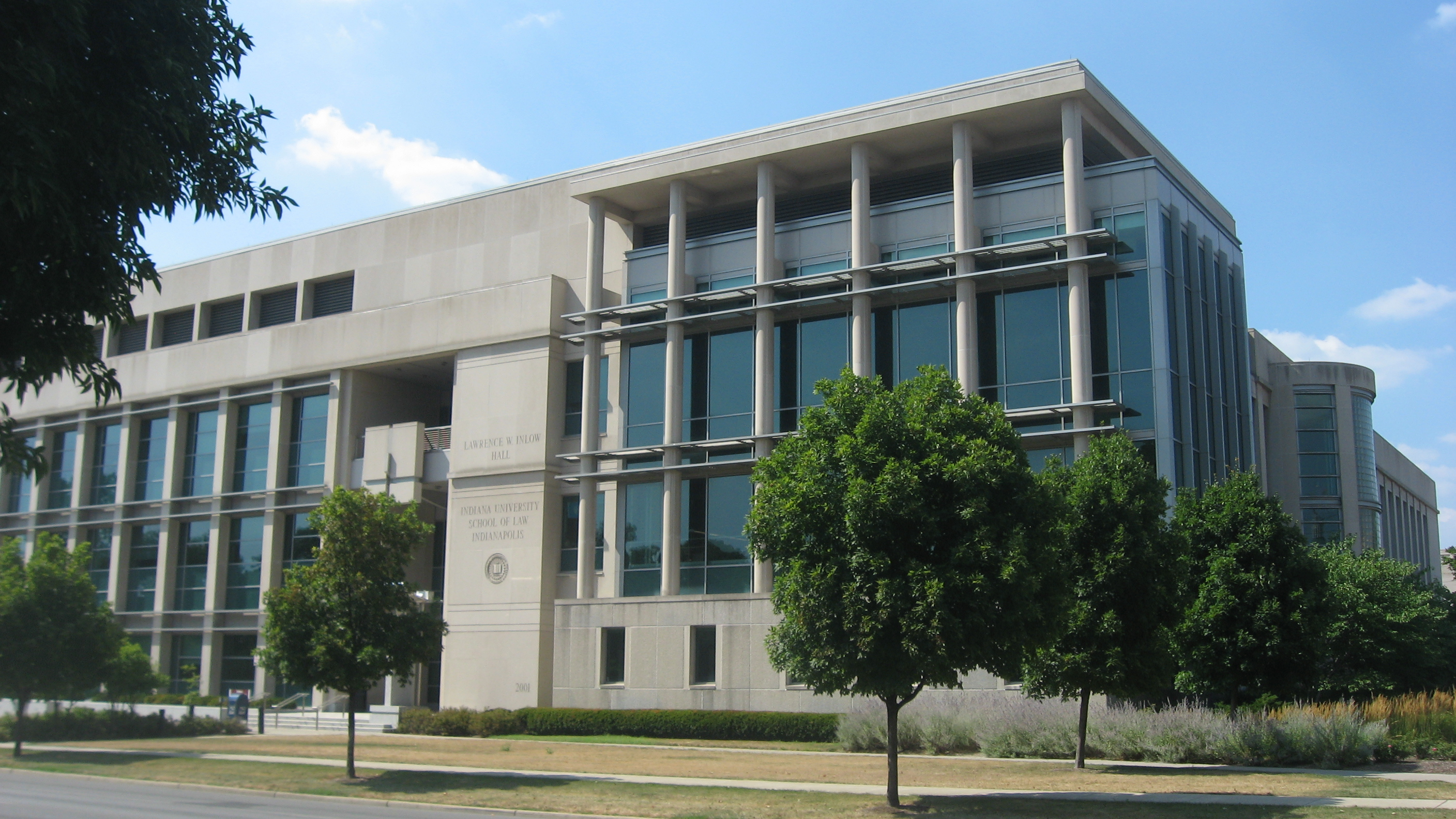
- Lawrence W. Inlow Hall in 2011
- Established: 1894; 132 years ago
- School type: Public law school
- Dean: Karen Bravo
- Location: Indianapolis, Indiana, U.S.
- Enrollment: 773 (2024)
- Faculty: 44 (2024, full time)
- USNWR ranking: 124th (tie) (2026)
- Website: mckinneylaw.iu.edu

Indiana University Robert H. McKinney School of Law (IU McKinney) is the law school of Indiana University Indianapolis, a public research university in Indianapolis, Indiana, United States. The school has been based in Lawrence W. Inlow Hall in Indianapolis since 2001. IU McKinney is one of two law schools operated by Indiana University, the other being the Indiana University Maurer School of Law in Bloomington. Although both law schools are part of Indiana University, each law school is wholly independent of the other.

According to IU McKinney's 2019 ABA-required disclosures, 59% of the Class of 2018 obtained full-time, long-term, J.D.-required employment within ten months after graduation.

== History ==
The Benjamin Harrison Law School was established in 1914. Minnie Elizabeth Mason and Adele Storck became the first two women to graduate from the law school in 1921. They went on to found Storck & Mason, one of the first woman-owned law firms in the country. In 1936, Benjamin Harrison Law School merged with the Indiana Law School. Indiana University acquired the Indiana Law School in 1944. It became the Indiana University School of Law at Indianapolis. The school's name was changed in December 2011 in recognition of a $24 million gift from Robert H. McKinney, who previously was chairman and CEO of First Indiana Corporation and among the founders of the Bose McKinney & Evans LLP Indianapolis law firm. The gift was the largest in school history and was part of an arrangement to match funds with an IUPUI fundraising campaign, for a total value of $31.5 million. The school was renamed after McKinney. In the summer of 2020, the school put out a statement, featured in the antiracist clearinghouse from The Association of American Law Schools, which stated that the deaths of George Floyd, Ahmaud Arbery and Breonna Taylor were senseless and for no reason. Bravo has stated that she has a duty to affirm anti-racist efforts within McKinney.

== Admissions ==
For the class entering in 2024, the law school accepted 492 out of 782 applicants (a 62.92% acceptance rate), with 263 of those accepted enrolling, a 53.46% yield rate (the percentage of accepted students who enrolled). Six students were not included in the acceptance statistics. The class consisted of 269 students. The median LSAT score was 155 and the median undergraduate GPA was 3.59. Five students were not included in the GPA calculation and seven not included in the LSAT calculation. The reported 25th/75th percentile LSAT scores and GPAs were 152/159 and 3.31/3.83.

== Online programs ==
IU McKinney has been an early mover in online course development, with a regular offering of up to ten courses per semester, including the Summer term, offered online. Most of these classes are asynchronous online courses taught by full time tenured members of the law school faculty. IU McKinney Online courses are available to students in the JD, LLM, and Masters of Jurisprudence programs; and to visiting students earning credits to transfer back to their home institutions. These online offerings include core, required, and highly recommended courses, as well as upper level specialty courses. Most IU McKinney Online courses have been produced in a 1-1 partnership with Ph.D. course designers working with Indiana University e-Learning Design and Services or the IUPUI Center for Teaching and Learning. The director of online programs is a senior member of the tenured law faculty, Max Huffman.

== Employment ==
According to IU McKinney's 2019 ABA-required disclosures, 61% of the Class of 2018 obtained full-time, long-term, J.D.-required employment within ten months after graduation. Across the three categories of employment ordinarily considered to be appropriate for comparison, the ABA 2019 summary reports that IU McKinney graduates were employed at an 88% rate, compared to a national average of 86% and an Indiana average of 88%.

== Costs ==
The total cost of attendance (indicating the cost of tuition, fees, and living expenses) at IU McKinney for the 2019–2020 academic year for an Indiana resident was $49,710, and $69,770 for a non-resident. The Law School Transparency estimated debt-financed cost of attendance for three years is $185,611 for an Indiana resident and $258,039 for a non-Indiana resident.

== Rankings ==
In 2026, U.S. News & World Report ranked the school tied for 129th out of 197 schools. In its 2019 edition, U.S. News ranked the school 98th, 8th in legal writing, 10th in healthcare law (tied with Harvard) and 18th in part-time legal programs.

== Law reviews ==
The Indiana International & Comparative Law Review (II&CLR) has been published annually since 1991. The Indiana Health Law Review addresses issues related to "bioethics, malpractice liability, managed care, anti-trust, health care organizations, medical-legal research, legal medicine, food and drug, and other current health-related topics". It was first published in the 2004–2005 academic year. IU McKinney also publishes the Indiana Law Review and European Journal of Law Reform and the Indiana Law Review.

== Center ==
=== William S. and Christine S. Hall Center for Law and Health ===
The Center for Law and Health was established in 1987, with the mission of conducting research on health care law in Indiana. The Center was first announced by, then Vice President, Gerald Bepko is his State of the Campus speech on January 7, 1988. The center was ranked among the top 10 by U.S. News in 2004. It houses the Indiana Health Law Review.

== Notable faculty ==
- Cleon H. Foust
- Lawrence Jegen
- Edwin R. Keedy
- Jon Krahulik
- Gerard Magliocca
- David Orentlicher
- Gary R. Roberts
- Florence Roisman
- John Lawrence Hill

== Ruth Lilly Law library ==
The Ruth Lilly Law Library is the school's law library, holding approximately 603,000 volumes.

== Alumni ==
- Frederick Van Nuys (1900), U.S. Senator
- Harry G. Leslie (1907), Governor of Indiana
- Arthur Raymond Robinson (1910), U.S. Senator
- Samuel D. Jackson (1917), U.S. Senator
- Virginia Dill McCarty (1950), first woman appointed to full four-year term as a U.S. Attorney (Southern District of Indiana), first woman to run for Governor of Indiana
- Edgar Whitcomb (1950), Governor of Indiana
- Harriette Bailey Conn (1955), first woman and the first African American to serve as Indiana's state public defender
- Brent Dickson (1968), Chief Justice of the Indiana Supreme Court
- Dan Coats (1972), U.S. Representative, ambassador to Germany, U.S. Senator, and Director of National Intelligence
- Dan Quayle (1974), former U.S. Representative, U.S. Senator, and 44th Vice President of the United States
- Marilyn Quayle (1974), American lawyer, novelist, and Second Lady of the United States from 1989 until 1993
- Ahmad Natabaya (1981), former judge on the Constitutional Court of Indonesia
- Brian Bosma (1984), former Speaker of the Indiana House of Representatives
- Willard Gemmill (1902), Justice of the Indiana Supreme Court
- John R. Gregg (1984), former Speaker of the Indiana House of Representatives and Democratic candidate for Governor of Indiana
- Lawson Harvey (1882), Justice of the Indiana Supreme Court
- Susan Brooks (1985), U.S. Representative
- Mike Pence (1986), U.S. Representative, Governor of Indiana, and 48th Vice President of the United States
- John S. Pistole, Transportation Security Administration administrator
- Todd Rokita (1995), U.S. Representative, former Secretary of State of Indiana, and Indiana Attorney General.
- Steven David, Justice of the Indiana Supreme Court
- Mark Massa, Justice of the Indiana Supreme Court
- George Tremain (1900), Justice of the Indiana Supreme Court
- Dan Flanagan (1921), Justice of the Indiana Supreme Court
- Jon Krahulik (1969), Justice of the Indiana Supreme Court
- William L. Taylor, Indiana Attorney General
- John J. Dillon (1952), Indiana Attorney General
- Marc Griffin (1992), American lawyer, world's youngest judge
- Todd Young (2006), U.S. Senator
