= Evan Bayh =

American politician (born 1955)

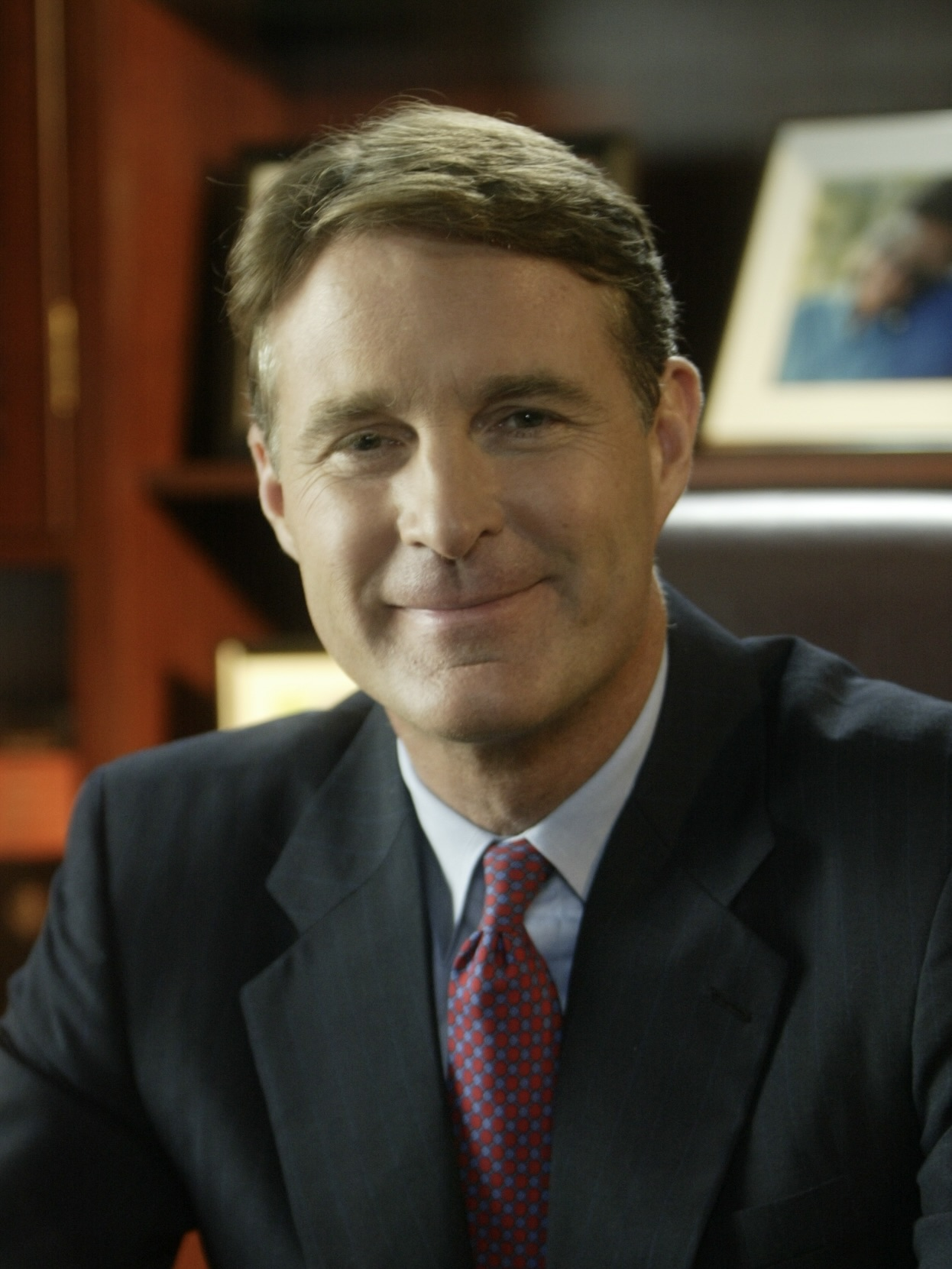
- Official portrait, 2004

United States Senator from Indiana
- In office January 3, 1999 – January 3, 2011
- Preceded by: Dan Coats
- Succeeded by: Dan Coats

46th Governor of Indiana
- In office January 9, 1989 – January 13, 1997
- Lieutenant: Frank O'Bannon
- Preceded by: Robert Orr
- Succeeded by: Frank O'Bannon

56th Secretary of State of Indiana
- In office December 1, 1986 – January 9, 1989
- Governor: Robert Orr
- Preceded by: Edwin Simcox
- Succeeded by: Joe Hogsett

Personal details
- Born: Birch Evans Bayh III; December 26, 1955 (age 70) Shirkieville, Indiana, U.S.
- Party: Democratic
- Spouse: Susan Breshears (m. 1985; died 2021)
- Children: 2, including Beau
- Parents: Birch Bayh (father); Marvella Hern (mother)
- Education: Indiana University, Bloomington (BS); University of Virginia (JD)
- Bayh's voice Bayh introducing an amendment during debate on the Energy Independence and Security Act of 2007. Recorded June 12, 2007

Birch Evans "Evan" Bayh III (/baɪ/ BY; born December 26, 1955) is an American politician who served as the 46th governor of Indiana from 1989 to 1997 and as a United States senator representing Indiana from 1999 to 2011. A member of the Democratic Party, he served on the President's Intelligence Advisory Board under President Joe Biden.

Bayh is the son of Senator Birch Bayh and the grandson of basketball coach Birch Bayh Sr.. He was first elected to public office as the Secretary of State of Indiana in 1986. He held the position for two years before being elected governor. He left his office after completing two terms and briefly took a job lecturing at Indiana University Bloomington. He was elected to Congress as a senator in 1998 and reelected in 2004.

On February 15, 2010, Bayh unexpectedly announced he would not seek reelection to the Senate in 2010. After leaving the Senate, he was replaced by his predecessor, Dan Coats, and became a partner with the law and consulting firm McGuireWoods in the firm's Washington, D.C. office, and also became a senior adviser with Apollo Global Management. He was a part-time contributor for Fox News from March 2011 to July 2016. In June 2011 he became a messaging adviser for the U.S. Chamber of Commerce. On October 27, 2011, it was announced that Berry Plastics Corp. had appointed Bayh to its board of directors.

Following the withdrawal of 2016 Democratic primary winner Baron Hill, Bayh announced that he would be running to take back his old Senate seat from retiring Republican incumbent Dan Coats. He was defeated by Todd Young in the general election by a nearly 10-point margin (52.1% to 42.4%). On June 15, 2022, President Joe Biden named Bayh to serve as a member of the President's Intelligence Advisory Board.

== Early life, education and early political career ==
Birch Evans Bayh III was born on December 26, 1955, in Shirkieville, Indiana, to Marvella Bayh (née Hern; 1933–1979) and Birch E. Bayh Jr. (1928–2019), who was a U.S. Senator from 1963 until 1981, following his electoral defeat by then-Representative and future Vice President Dan Quayle.

Evan Bayh attended St. Albans School in Washington, D.C., and graduated with honors with a Bachelor of Science in business administration from the Kelley School of Business at Indiana University Bloomington in 1978. At Indiana, he became a member of the Phi Kappa Psi fraternity's Indiana Beta chapter.

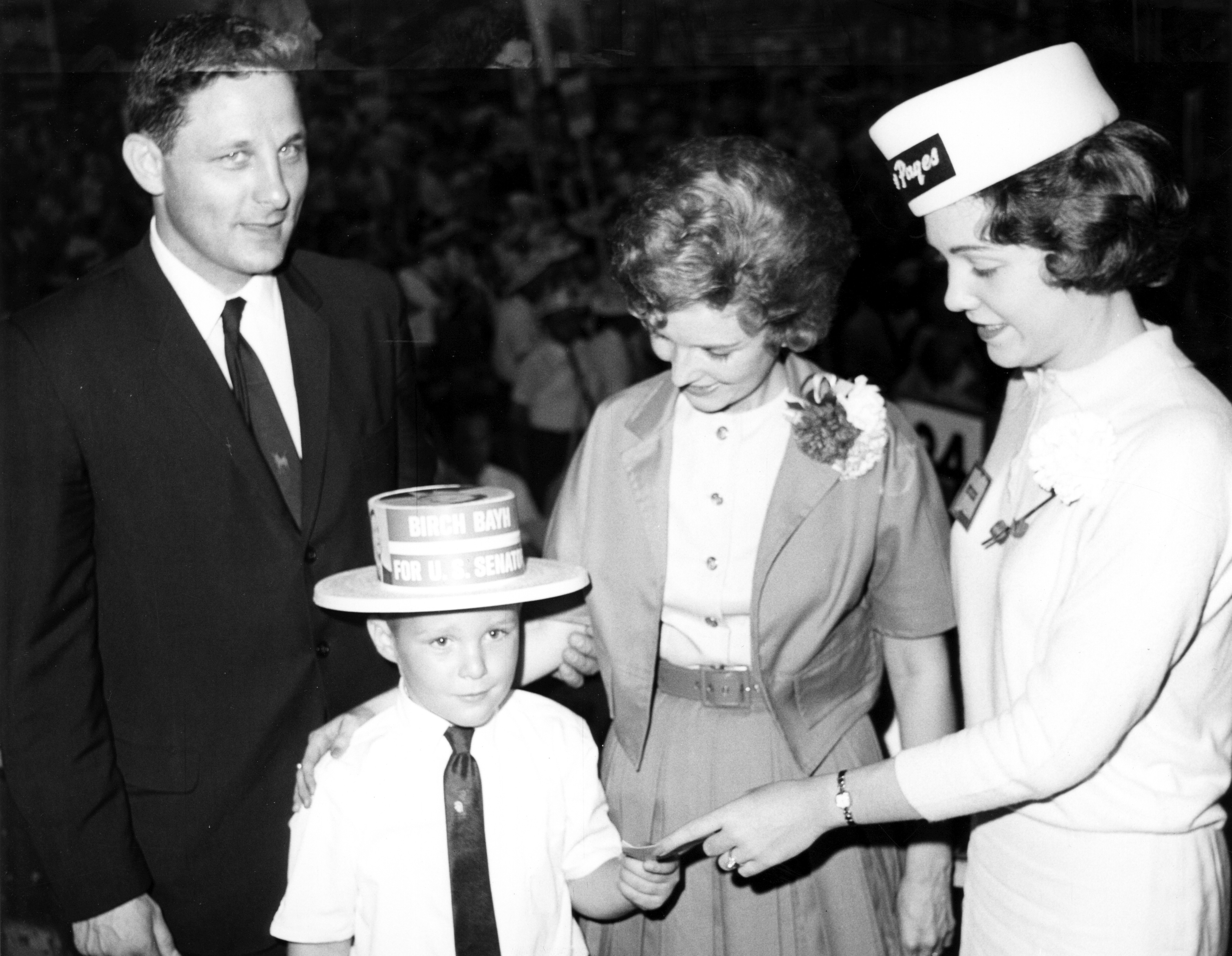
Bayh with his father Birch and mother Marvella during his father's 1962 Senate campaign

Bayh received his Juris Doctor degree from the University of Virginia School of Law in 1981, and in 1982, he was a law clerk for U.S. District Judge James Ellsworth Noland.

=== Secretary of State of Indiana (1986–1989) ===
After a debate over whether he met the state's five-year residency requirement to be on the ballot, Bayh was elected secretary of state of Indiana in 1986 with 53% of the vote.

== Governor of Indiana (1989–1997) ==
Bayh defeated former Kokomo Mayor Steve Daily in the Democratic primary of the 1988 Indiana gubernatorial election. He went on to defeat the incumbent lieutenant governor (Republican John Mutz) in the general election, becoming the first Democrat to serve as governor of Indiana in 20 years. Only 32 years old upon his election and 33 when he took office, Bayh became the youngest governor in the nation at the time. He was re-elected as governor in 1992, defeating State Attorney General Linley E. Pearson with 63% of the vote.

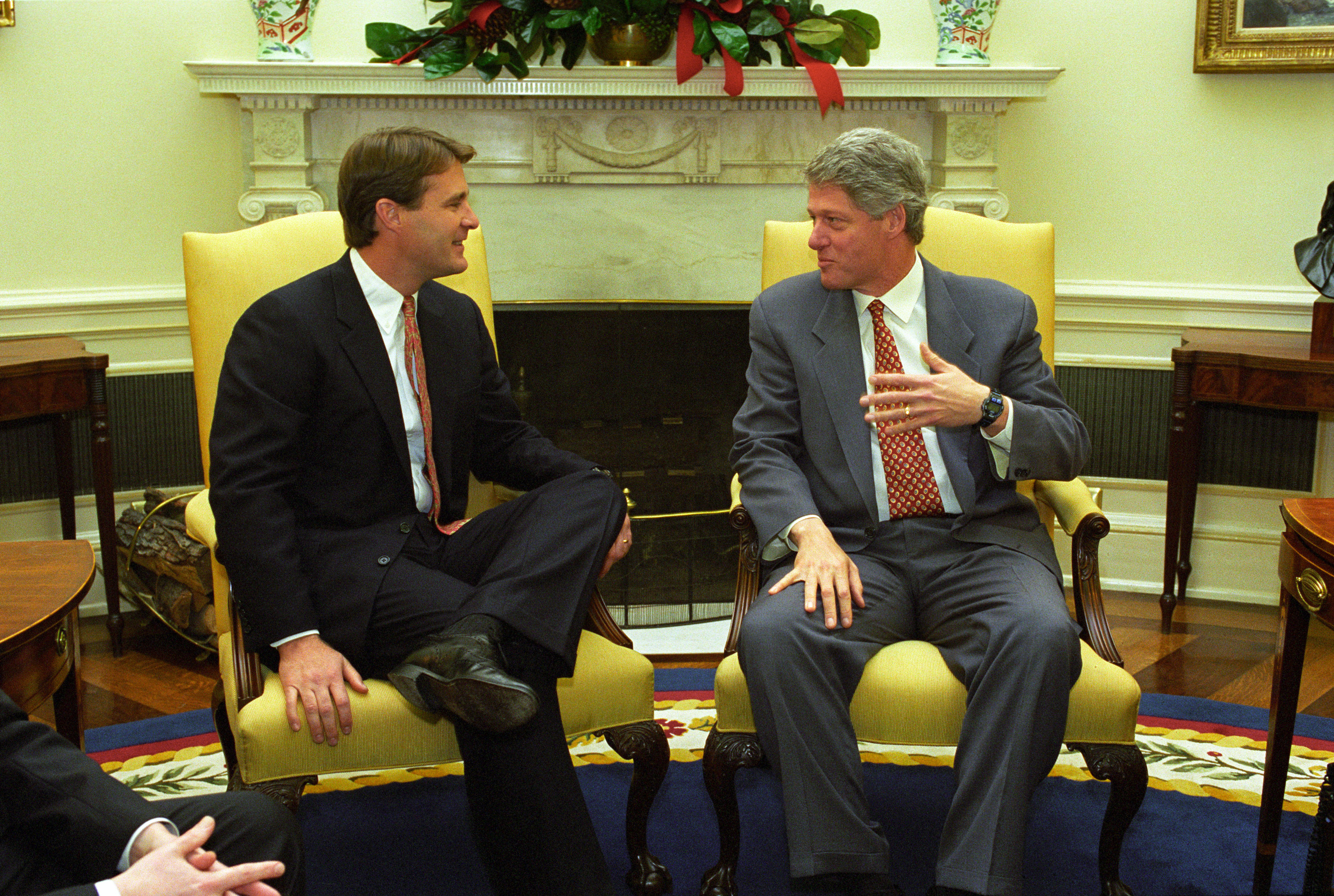
Bayh with President Bill Clinton in 1993

By the end of his second term, Bayh had an approval rating of nearly 80 percent. He was ineligible to seek a third consecutive term in 1996 due to term limits.

When his second term as governor ended in 1997, he accepted a lecturing position at his alma mater, the Kelley School of Business at Indiana University Bloomington. From 1997 to 1998, while he was campaigning for U.S. Senate, Bayh was also hired as a partner at Indianapolis law firm Baker & Daniels. In 1998, his Baker & Daniels salary was $265,000, according to Senate financial records. Indiana University paid him an additional $51,000 that year.

== U.S. Senate ==
=== Elections ===
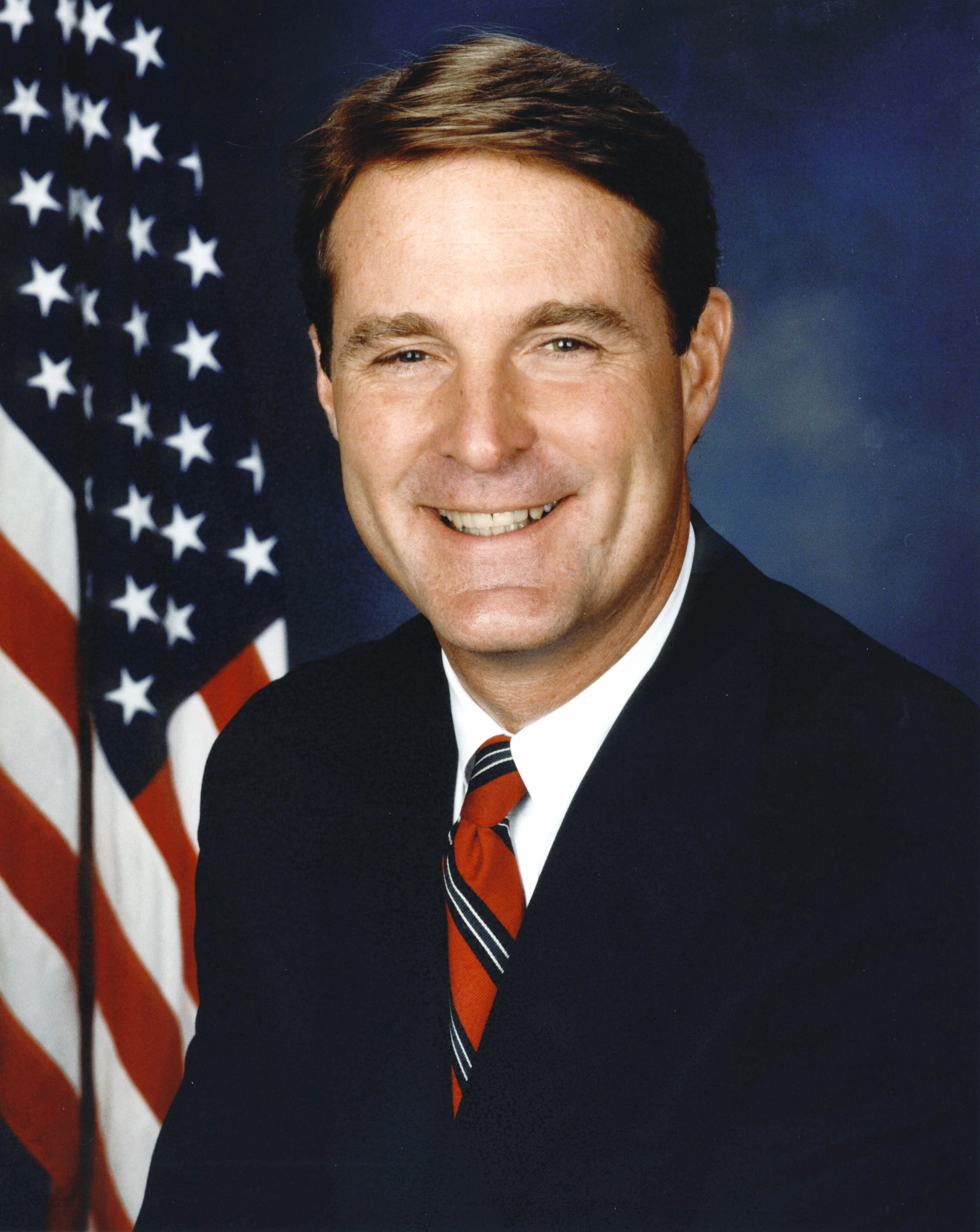
Bayh in 1999

Bayh was elected to the U.S. Senate in 1998 to the seat that was once held by his father. He won with 64% of the vote, the largest margin ever recorded for a Democrat in a U.S. Senate race in Indiana, defeating former Fort Wayne Mayor Paul Helmke.

He easily won reelection in 2004, defeating Prof. Marvin Scott, receiving 62% of the vote—in the process, becoming only the fifth Indiana Democrat to be popularly elected to a second term in the Senate.

Bayh released an autobiography in 2003 entitled From Father to Son: A Private Life in the Public Eye.

From 2001 to 2005, Bayh served as Chairman of the Democratic Leadership Council (DLC). He is also a member of the Senate Centrist Coalition, helped establish the New Democrat Coalition, and founded the Moderate Dems Working Group. Bayh also served on the board of directors of the National Endowment for Democracy.

Bayh was an early supporter of the Bush administration's policies on Iraq. On October 2, 2002, Bayh joined President George W. Bush and Congressional leaders in a Rose Garden ceremony announcing their agreement on the joint resolution authorizing the Iraq War, and was thanked by Bush and Senator John McCain for co-sponsoring the resolution. He voted yes on reauthorizing the Patriot Act in 2006.

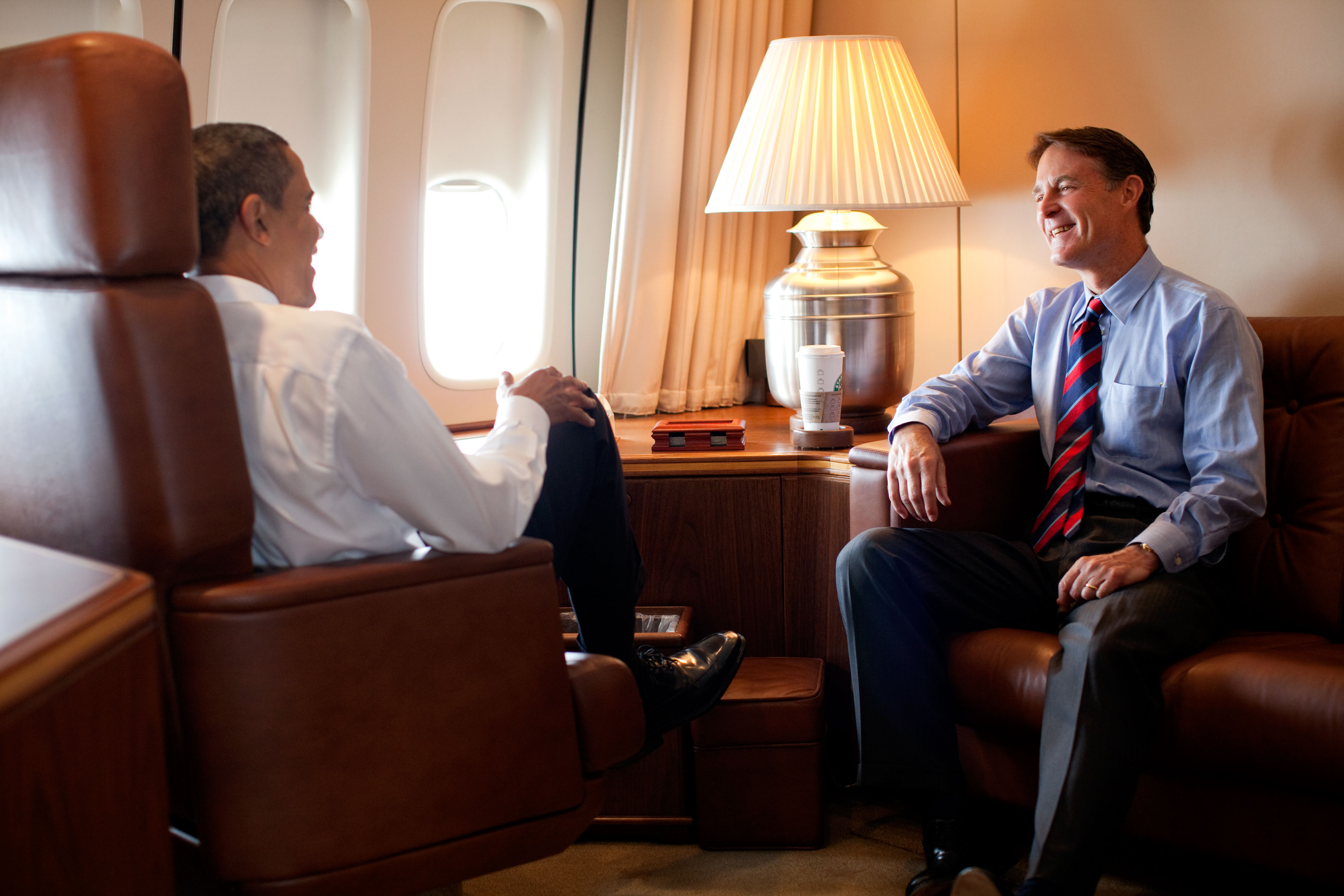
Bayh speaking with President Barack Obama on Air Force One in 2009

After the 2008 financial crisis, Bayh joined with his fellow senators in hurrying to bail out U.S. financial institutions. Addressing the launch of the No Labels political organization, he "described a scene from 2008 where Ben Bernanke warned senators that the sky would collapse if the banks weren't rescued. 'We looked at each other,' said Bayh, 'and said, okay, what do we need.'"

=== Relationship between office and wife's corporate career ===
Susan Bayh, Evan Bayh's late wife, had been described by the Fort Wayne Journal Gazette as a "professional board member" or "professional director", having been a director of fourteen corporations since 1994 and being a director of eight as of 2006.

The Journal Gazette reported that since Susan Bayh began her career as a corporate director, "Sen. Evan Bayh [has] cast more than 3,000 votes, including some on issues of keen interest to the pharmaceutical, broadcast, insurance, food-distribution and finance industries".

Since 2003, Bayh prohibited his staff from having lobbying contacts with his wife or representatives of the companies she directs. Bayh has insisted his wife's ties have had no bearing on his congressional actions. "The reality is I don't even know the people who run the vast majority of her companies. I've never even spoken to them," Bayh told the Journal Gazette. "The reality is, we don't talk about stuff that she's involved with."

=== Retirement ===
On February 15, 2010, Bayh announced he would not seek reelection to a third Senate term in the November 2, 2010, midterm election. Bayh's announcement came very shortly after former Senator Dan Coats declared his own candidacy for Bayh's Senate seat. Because he made his announcement the day before the deadline for filing for the primary, no Democrat was able to gather a sufficient number of signatures to qualify for the primary ballot, so the state party committee chose Congressman Brad Ellsworth as the nominee.

According to the Associated Press, Bayh spent a significant portion of his last year in office searching for a job, holding over four dozen meetings with potential corporate employers between February and December 2010. He also cast votes on issues of interest to his future corporate employers. A CNN analysis of Bayh's internal 2009 schedule found that he "maneuvered behind the scenes" and "privately engaged with fundraisers, lobbyists and donors who had a keen interest on the issues dominating Capitol Hill," raising potential conflict-of-interest concerns. His meetings included sessions with lobbyists for the health insurance industry prior to his announcement that he would support the Affordable Care Act.

=== Committee assignments ===
- Committee on Armed Services
  - Subcommittee on Airland
  - Subcommittee on Emerging Threats and Capabilities
  - Subcommittee on Readiness and Management Support (Chair)
- Committee on Banking, Housing, and Urban Affairs
  - Subcommittee on Financial Institutions
  - Subcommittee on Securities, Insurance, and Investment
  - Subcommittee on Security and International Trade and Finance (Chair)
- Committee on Energy and Natural Resources
  - Subcommittee on Energy
  - Subcommittee on National Parks
  - Subcommittee on Water and Power
- Committee on Small Business and Entrepreneurship
- Select Committee on Intelligence
- Special Committee on Aging

== 2008 presidential campaign ==
On December 1, 2006, news sources revealed that Bayh was creating a presidential exploratory committee. Bayh confirmed these reports on December 3. On December 15, 2006, Bayh announced that he would not run for president in 2008. He later endorsed Hillary Clinton.

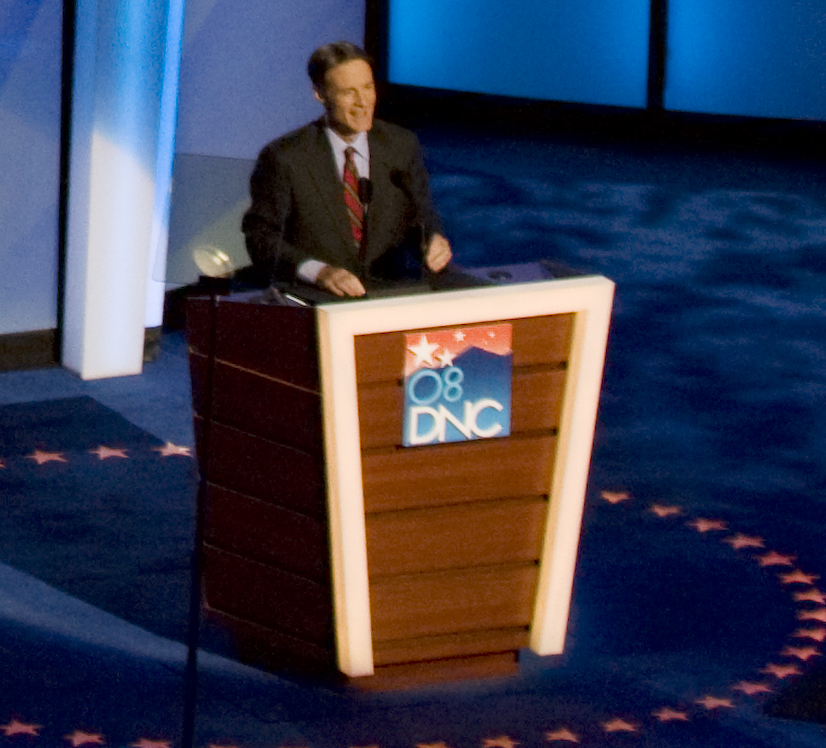
Bayh speaks during the third night of the 2008 Democratic National Convention in Denver, Colorado

During the 2008 United States Presidential campaign, Bayh stated that he would accept an offer to be Barack Obama's running mate. According to David Plouffe, it was a "coin toss" between Bayh and Joe Biden for Obama's pick for vice president, with Tim Kaine being a contender before deciding to focus on the DNC chairmanship. However, in his 2020 memoir A Promised Land Barack Obama does not mention that Bayh was considered a possible running mate, and indicated that when making the final decision as to who would be the second name on the ticket it was a straight choice between Biden and Kaine.

== Post-Senate career ==
After his retirement from the U.S. Senate, Bayh campaigned for Senator Joe Donnelly's two-day, five-city "main street tour," among other visits, and introduced Donnelly before his victory speech in Indiana's 2012 U.S. Senate election.

As of the end of 2015, Bayh had just over $9 million in unspent campaign cash.

Bayh's net worth soared to between $13.9 million and $48 million after he left office and began a post-Congress career with lobbying firms and corporate boards. This was a significant increase over the $6.8–$8.0 million in assets he reported during his last year in Congress. Bayh received over $6 million in compensation from salary, compensation from corporate boards, and speaking fees from January 2015 through October 2016.

=== 2016 U.S. Senate campaign ===
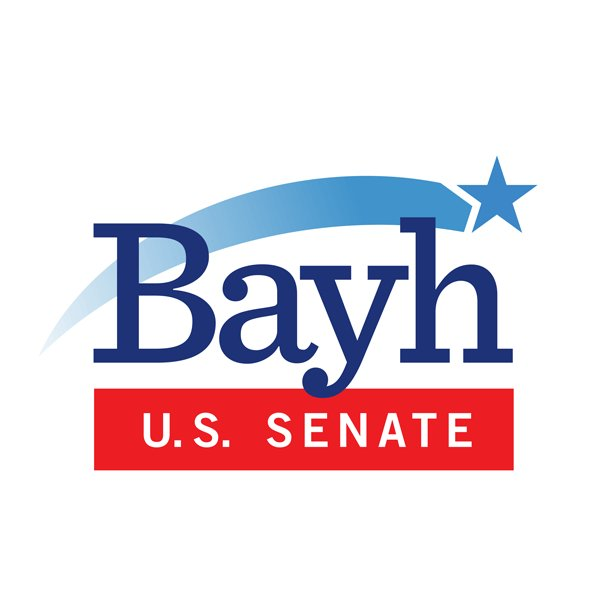
Bayh's 2016 campaign logo

On July 11, 2016, CNN reported that Bayh was preparing to enter the 2016 U.S. Senate election in Indiana to run for the seat being vacated by Dan Coats, who was retiring. Baron Hill, who won an uncontested primary to become the Democratic nominee on May 3, formally withdrew from the race on the same day to make way for Bayh's candidacy.

Bayh ran into criticism in August 2016 over his residency status in Indiana. WFLI-TV reported that he was listed twice as an "inactive voter" in Indiana records. CNN reported that Bayh repeatedly listed his two multimillion-dollar houses in Washington, D.C., as his primary residences, not his $53,000 condo in Indianapolis. When asked by a local television reporter to state his Indiana address, he stated the wrong address. In response, Bayh stated that he "voted in every primary and every general election for the last 25 to 30 years" and is "an active voter in Indiana," and when asked how often he is in Indiana, he stated, "all the time, frequently."

Bayh was defeated by Republican Representative Todd Young 52% to 42% in the November election. This was Bayh's first ever defeat in his home state, where he was once considered "unbeatable".

== Political positions ==
=== Abortion ===
Evan Bayh has a 100% rating by NARAL. He voted in favor of the Partial-Birth Abortion Ban Act in 2003. He voted against the Unborn Victims of Violence Act in 2004. He voted in favor of the Child Interstate Abortion Notification Act in 2006. He voted against an amendment to prohibit federal funds from going to groups that support coerced abortion. He repeatedly voted against amendments to prohibit federal funds from being used for abortions.

=== Agriculture ===
Bayh voted for the 2002 Farm Bill that provided financial support accessible to rural communities. The bill provides funds for rural water and waste infrastructure. The Farm Bill also provides technology for rural residents' technical skills.

=== Capital punishment ===
As governor of Indiana, Bayh was a vocal supporter of capital punishment.

=== Civil rights ===
Bayh has a mixed but left-leaning record on civil rights, having earned a 60% by the ACLU (2002), and 89% by the HRC (2006), and a 100% by the NAACP (2006). Some of his votes include a 1998 vote where Bayh voted to continue nonquota affirmative action programs. He voted to add sexual orientation under hate crime rules in both 2000 and 2002. In 2001, he voted yes to ease wiretapping restrictions. In 2006, he voted yes on a flag-burning constitutional amendment and no on an amendment to ban same-sex marriage.

=== Climate change ===
Bayh has been called "a fence-sitter on climate legislation," because he has stated concern about the effects of climate change but he also values cheap energy as beneficial to Indiana's manufacturing industry. In 2008 he signed a letter expressing concerns with a cap-and-trade bill known as the Climate Security Act that was then on the Senate floor, but he ultimately voted for the bill. In 2010 he voted to prevent the EPA from regulating greenhouse gas pollution.

=== Economy ===
At a speech to the Commonwealth Club of California, Bayh said:

What concerns me most about President Bush's tax and budget proposals, is that they threaten to undermine the foundation of the '90s' prosperity – replacing the "virtuous cycle" created by fiscal responsibility with a "vicious cycle" of deficits and debt, rising interest rates, and disinvestment. His proposals constitute a narrow ideological agenda, not an effective economic strategy, and completely fail to grasp the realities of the New Economy and the many requirements for economic success in the 21st Century.

=== Education ===
As governor, Bayh created the 21st Century Scholars program, which promises at-risk middle school students full tuition scholarships in return for being drug, alcohol and crime-free and maintaining decent grades. Iowa and Wisconsin have both introduced legislation modeling Bayh's program.

=== Environment ===
- Voted no on prohibiting eminent domain for use as parks or grazing land in December 2007.
- Voted yes on including oil and gas smokestacks in mercury regulations in September 2005.
- Rated 74% by the League of Conservation Voters, indicating pro-environment votes, in December 2003.
- Voted no on confirming Gale Norton as Secretary of Interior in January 2001.
- Voted no on more funding for forest roads and fish habitat in September 1999.
- Voted to strengthen prohibitions against animal fighting in January 2007.

=== Health care ===
Bayh introduced the Medicare Prescription Drug Emergency Guarantee Act of 2006 to amend titles XVIII and XIX of the Social Security Act to assure uninterrupted access to necessary medicines under the Medicare prescription drug program. Bayh proposed legislation he says could help cut health care insurance premiums by at least 20 percent for small businesses and individuals. He voted in favor of the Patient Protection and Affordable Care Act and the Health Care and Education Reconciliation Act (both 2010).

=== Israel ===
He is a member of AIPAC's advisory committee.

=== Iran ===
Bayh appeared on CNN's Late Edition in January 2006 and referred to the "radical, almost delusional nature of the Iranian regime" and recent comments of Iranian President Mahmoud Ahmadinejad that the Holocaust is a "myth. To deny history like this, this virulent anti-Semitism, their sponsoring of terrorism, their search for a nuclear weapon – ought to be a wake-up call to every American. Appeasement won't work. We need to use diplomacy, economic sanctions, other means, so we won't have to resort to military action."

Bayh introduced legislation in January 2006 that would impose sanctions on Iran.

On January 20, 2006, Bayh introduced a resolution calling for economic sanctions on Iran, with the goal of deterring Iran from developing nuclear weapons. In 2007, Bayh "supported the Kyl-Lieberman amendment that Obama made a key part of his critique of Clinton."

=== Iraq ===
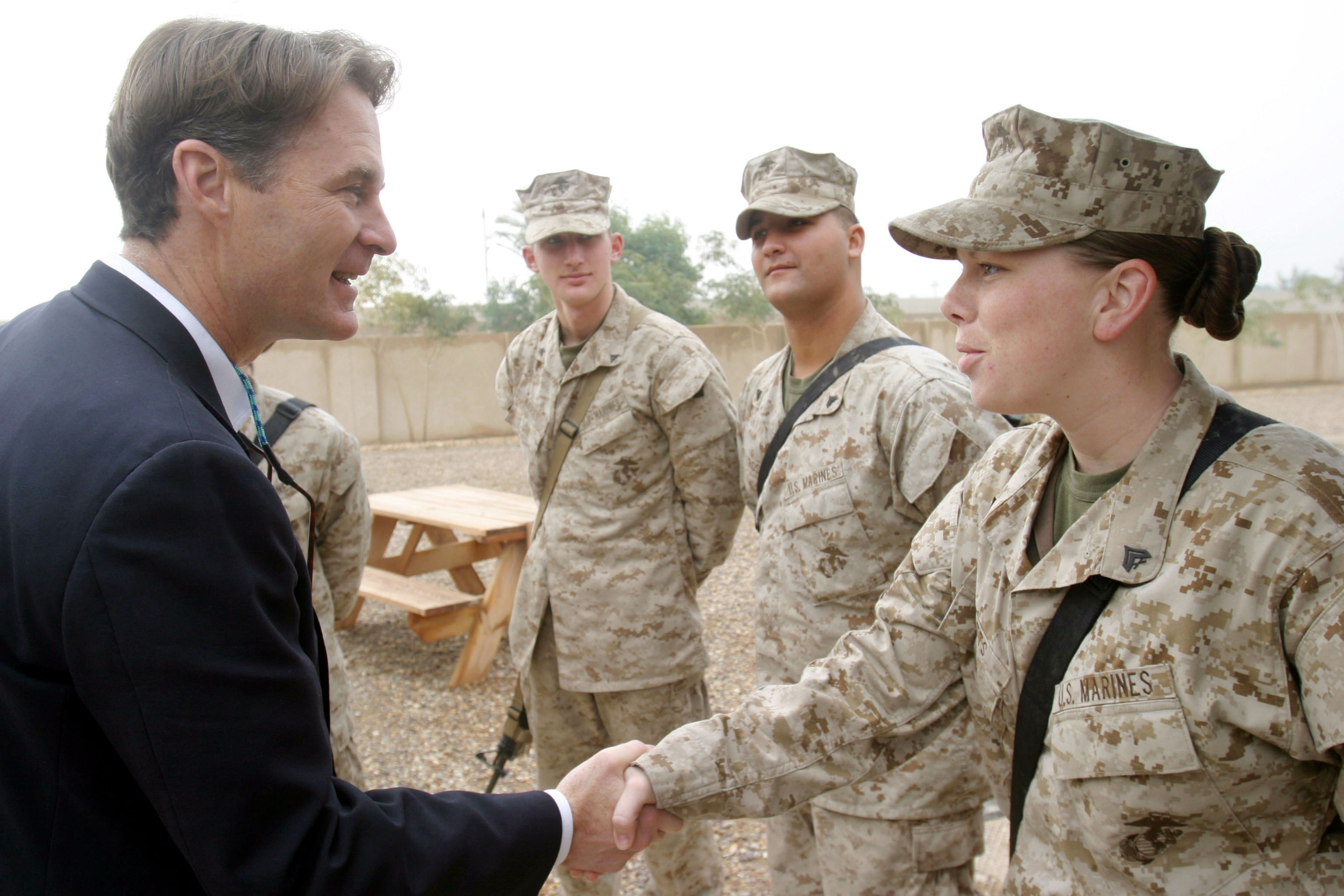
Bayh shakes the hand of a Marine while visiting Iraq in January 2006

Bayh was an early supporter of the idea of removing Saddam Hussein from power for humanitarian reasons.

On October 2, 2002, Bayh joined President George W. Bush and congressional leaders in a Rose Garden ceremony announcing their agreement on the joint resolution authorizing the Iraq War, and was thanked by Bush and Senator John McCain for co-sponsoring the resolution. In 2006, Bayh criticized the conduct of the Iraq War:

It is clear to just about everyone but the die-hard neoconservatives within this administration that shifting our focus away from Osama bin Laden to Saddam Hussein was perhaps the biggest strategic blunder in our nation's history. And while we have been preoccupied with Iraq, under this President, North Korea has gone nuclear and Iran is on the verge of doing so.

A blog from The Washington Post reported that in February 2006 Bayh was quoted saying: "We've got to be somewhere between 'cut and run' ... and mindlessly staying the course. You've got to have a sensible middle ground."

=== Trade ===
During his time in the Senate, Bayh criticized trade policies of some countries, including China. Bayh's bipartisan Stopping Overseas Subsidies (SOS) Act was intended to allow the United States to enforce its antisubsidy laws abroad. He voted against CAFTA.

Bayh placed a hold on the President's nominee to be the U.S. Trade Representative. After receiving several key commitments from nominee (later U.S. Senator) Rob Portman to get tough on China trade, Bayh agreed to release his hold.

== Personal life ==
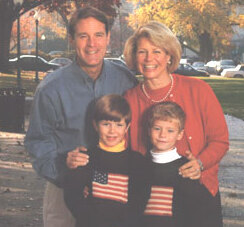
Bayh with his wife and sons in the early-2000s

Bayh met his future wife Susan Bayh, a former Miss Southern California, on a blind date in Washington, D.C., in 1981, where Evan interned for a Washington law firm, and Susan interned for a California congressman.

They married in 1985, and, in 1995, Susan gave birth to their twin sons, Birch Evans IV (Beau) and Nicholas. Susan Bayh was an attorney, having graduated from the University of Southern California's Gould School of Law in 1984, and worked for Indiana-based pharmaceutical Eli Lilly. She also taught at Butler University's College of Business Administration, and served on the boards of directors for a number of publicly traded and private companies, including health insurance company Anthem. She battled brain cancer and died from glioblastoma on February 5, 2021.

Bayh is an Episcopalian.

== Electoral history ==
Indiana Secretary of State, 1986
Party	Candidate	Votes	%
Democratic	Evan Bayh	828,494	53.3%
Republican	Robert Bowen	704,952	45.4%
American	Linda Paterson	10,224	0.7%
Libertarian	Karen Benson	10,180	0.7%

Democratic Nomination for Governor of Indiana, 1988
Candidate	Votes	%
Evan Bayh	493,198	83.1
Stephen Daily	66,242	11.2
Frank O'Bannon	34,360	5.8

Governor of Indiana, 1988
Party	Candidate	Votes	%
Democratic	Evan Bayh	1,138,574	53.2%
Republican	John Mutz	1,002,207	46.8%

Governor of Indiana, 1992
Party	Candidate	Votes	%
Democratic	Evan Bayh (incumbent)	1,382,151	62.0%
Republican	Linley Pearson	822,533	36.9%
New Alliance	Mary Barton	24,378	1.1%

U.S. Senator from Indiana (Class 3), 1998
Party	Candidate	Votes	%
Democratic	Evan Bayh	1,012,244	63.7%
Republican	Paul Helmke	552,732	34.8%
Libertarian	Rebecca Sink-Burris	23,641	1.5%

U.S. Senator from Indiana (Class 3), 2004
Party	Candidate	Votes	%
Democratic	Evan Bayh (incumbent)	1,496,976	61.6%
Republican	Marvin Scott	903,913	37.3%
Libertarian	Albert Barger	27,344	1.1%
Majority		593,063	24.3%
Total votes		2,428,233	100.00%
Democratic hold			

U.S. Senator from Indiana (Class 3), 2016
Party	Candidate	Votes	%
Republican	Todd Young	1,423,991	52.11%
Democratic	Evan Bayh	1,158,947	42.41%
Libertarian	Lucy Brenton	149,481	5.47%
Write-in	James L. Johnson, Jr.	127	0.01%
Majority		265,044	9.75%
Total votes		2,732,573	100.00%
Republican hold			

== See also ==
- Birch Evans Bayh Sr.
- Senator Birch Bayh
- List of governors of Indiana

Party political offices
Preceded by Stephen Beardsley	Democratic nominee for Secretary of State of Indiana; 1986	Succeeded by Joe Hogsett
Preceded by Wayne Townsend	Democratic nominee for Governor of Indiana; 1988, 1992	Succeeded by Frank O'Bannon
Preceded by David Walters	Chair of the Democratic Governors Association; 1993–1994	Succeeded by Mel Carnahan
Preceded by Bill Bradley; Barbara Jordan; Zell Miller	Keynote Speaker of the Democratic National Convention; 1996	Succeeded by Harold Ford
Preceded by Joe Hogsett	Democratic nominee for U.S. Senator from Indiana (Class 3); 1998, 2004	Succeeded by Brad Ellsworth
Preceded by Joe Lieberman	Chair of the Democratic Leadership Council; 2001–2005	Succeeded by Tom Vilsack
Preceded by Baron Hill; Withdrew	Democratic nominee for U.S. Senator from Indiana (Class 3); 2016	Succeeded by Thomas McDermott Jr.
Political offices
Preceded by Edwin Simcox	Secretary of State of Indiana; 1986–1989	Succeeded by Joe Hogsett
Preceded by Robert Orr	Governor of Indiana; 1989–1997	Succeeded by Frank O'Bannon
U.S. Senate
Preceded by Dan Coats	U.S. Senator (Class 3) from Indiana; 1999–2011; Served alongside: Dick Lugar	Succeeded by Dan Coats
U.S. order of precedence (ceremonial)
Preceded by David Vitter as Former U.S. Senator	Order of precedence of the United States as Former U.S. Senator	Succeeded by Claire McCaskill as Former U.S. Senator
