= Virginia Dill McCarty =

American lawyer

United States Attorney for the Southern District of Indiana
- In office 1977–1981
- President: Jimmy Carter
- Preceded by: James B. Young
- Succeeded by: Sarah Evans Barker

Personal details
- Born: December 15, 1924 Plainfield, Indiana
- Died: May 26, 2006 (aged 81) Indianapolis, Indiana
- Party: Democratic
- Spouse: Mendel McCarty (m. 1946; died 1973)
- Children: 2
- Education: Indiana University, Bloomington (BA); Indiana University, Indianapolis (LLB)

Virginia Dill McCarty (December 15, 1924 – May 26, 2006) was an American lawyer who served as the U.S. Attorney for the U.S. District Court for the Southern District of Indiana from 1977 to 1981, and became the first woman to be appointed and serve a full, four-year term as U.S. Attorney. McCarty's career as a public servant in Indiana also worked as a deputy attorney general and assistant attorney general for the State of Indiana (1964–1969), a member of the Indiana Board of Law Examiners (1971–1976), chief counsel to the Marion County, Indiana, Prosecutor (1975–1976), and chairman of the Board for the Indiana Department of Correction (1989–2006). In addition, McCarty co-founded the Indiana Women's Political Caucus and the Greater Indianapolis Women's Political Caucus in 1971 and served as the first president of each organization. As an advocate for women's equality and increasing women's roles in politics and government, McCarty was also involved in the campaign to ratify the Equal Rights Amendment in Indiana in 1977.

McCarty, a native of Plainfield, Indiana, and a Phi Beta Kappa member, graduated first in her class from the Indiana University School of Law–Indianapolis (the present-day Indiana University Robert H. McKinney School of Law) in 1950 and was a partner in private law practice in Indianapolis. McCarty was a recipient of an honorary J.D. degree from Indiana Central College (the present-day University of Indianapolis) in 1979, and an honorary Doctor of Law degree from IU School of Law–Indianapolis, in 1986. In addition to her legal work, McCarty was active in Democratic Party politics in Indiana, but was unsuccessful in her bids for elected office. In 1966 McCarty was the first woman to be nominated by major party for a judgeship in Marion County, Indiana, and in 1976, she was the first woman in Indiana to be nominated for Indiana Attorney General. In 1983, she became first woman candidate to run for the office of Governor of Indiana, but she lost in the Democratic primary in 1984. McCarthy also announced her candidacy for the 1988 Indiana gubernatorial race, but ended her campaign in April 1987 due to insufficient campaign funds.

== Early life and education ==
Virginia Dill was born on December 15, 1924, in Plainfield, Indiana, to Martha Gertrude (Paddack) Dill and Doctor Erasmus Millard Dill. Virginia continued her education at Indiana University in Bloomington, Indiana, where she earned a bachelor's degree in 1946, and earned a bachelor of laws (LL.B.) degree, cum laude, from the Indiana University School of Law–Indianapolis (the present-day Indiana University Robert H. McKinney School of Law) in 1950. At IU she became a member of Phi Beta Kappa, graduated first in her law school class, and was elected Indianapolis editor of the Indiana Law Journal. She was the recipient of an honorary J.D. degree from Indiana Central College (the present-day University of Indianapolis) in 1979, and an honorary Doctor of Law degree from IU School of Law–Indianapolis in 1986.

On April 28, 1946, Virginia Dill married Mendel Oz McCarty. They were the parents of two children: a daughter, Janet McCarty, and son, Michael McCarty. After Mendel McCarty died on March 31, 1973, Virginia Dill McCarty, a working mother, continue her career in law and politics.

== Career ==
McCarty's career included work as a private practice lawyer, a public servant, and a politician in Indiana.

=== Early years ===
McCarty's first job after completing law school in 1950 was "regulating wages and prices" at H. P. Wasson and Company, a department store in Indianapolis, Indiana, before she joined the federal Office of Price Stabilization. In 1952, she spent a year working for a title company.

In the 1960s and 1970s, McCarty resumed her career following the birth of her two children. In 1965 she began working as deputy attorney general for the State of Indiana and worked as an assistant attorney general from 1966 to 1969 under AG John J. Dillon. McCarty also served from 1971 to 1976 as a member of the Indiana Board of Law Examiners, and as chief counsel to the Marion County, Indiana, prosecutor from 1975 to 1976.

McCarty, a member of the Democratic Party, did not become active in politics until 1965, when she was forty years old. In 1966, McCarty was first woman to be nominated by major party (the Democrats) for a judgeship in Marion County, Indiana, and was nominated again in 1970, but was not elected. In 1976, the Democrats nominated her as the party's candidate for Indiana Attorney General, making McCarty the first woman in Indiana to be nominated for the position. Although she lost the race to the incumbent Theodore L. Sendak, McCarty received more votes than any other Democratic candidate since 1968.

=== U.S. District Attorney ===
U.S. Senator Birch Bayh recommended McCarty for U.S. Attorney for the U.S. District Court for the Southern District of Indiana in February 1977, and U.S. President Jimmy Carter appointed her to the post in June 1977. McCarty served from 1977 to 1981, becoming the first woman to be appointed and serve a full, four-year term as U.S. Attorney.

=== Equal rights advocate ===
In 1971, McCarty co-founded the Indiana Women's Political Caucus and the Greater Indianapolis Women's Political Caucus. She also served as the first president of each organization. The goal of the Indiana Women's Political Caucus, an affiliate of the National Women's Political Caucus, was "to advance the status of women through political action." Among its primary concern was passage of the Equal Rights Amendment (ERA), in addition to seeking equal pay and job opportunities for women and involving more women in leadership positions in politics and government. In the 1970s and 1980s, the Indiana Women's Political Caucus achieved some success in getting women elected and appointed to political offices at the state and local levels: Susan Williams was elected to the Indianapolis City-County Council, and later became executive director of the Indiana State Building Commission; Judge Paula E. Lopossa was elected to the Center Township (Indianapolis) Small Claims Court; Judge Patricia A. Riley was elected to the Indiana Court of Appeals; and in the 1984 Indiana gubernatorial election, Ann DeLaney became the first woman nominee for office of Lieutenant Governor of Indiana.

McCarty was also involved in the campaign to ratify the Equal Rights Amendment in Indiana in 1977, along with Indiana Women's Political Caucus, the Greater Indianapolis Women's Political Caucus, and others. Although McCarty supported passage of the ERA, she was unsure of its effectiveness in securing equal rights in the private sector. According to McCarty, "All it would do was give us equal rights as far as the government was concerned but it wouldn’t affect private employment at all, I thought. But it became the battleground for the feminists versus the anti-feminists."

=== Candidate for Indiana governor ===
In 1983, at the age of fifty-four, McCarty became first woman candidate to run for the office of Governor of Indiana. McCarty, the second Democrat to declare her candidacy in the 1984 Indiana gubernatorial election, pledged "equal justice under law" as part of her platform. During her campaign travels throughout the state, McCarty encouraged women and girls to take more active roles in politics and government. McCarty lost in the primary election In 1984 to Wayne Townsend, the Democratic Party's eventual nominee, and Townsend lost in the general election to the Republican incumbent, Governor Robert D. Orr. McCarty also declared her candidacy for Indiana governor for the 1988 Indiana gubernatorial election, but ended her campaign in April 1987 due to insufficient campaign funds. Indiana Secretary of State Evan Bayh became the Democratic Party's nominee and went on to defeat Indiana lieutenant governor John Mutz, the Republican Party's nominee, in the general election.)

=== Private practice lawyer ===
McCarty was a partner in the law firm of Dillon, McCarty, Hardamon and Cohen in Indianapolis from 1969 until 1977. After her term as U.S. Attorney ended in 1981, she returned to Indianapolis and resumed her private practice, working as a partner with the Landman Beatty law firm until her death in 2006.

== Later years ==
In addition to practicing law in Indianapolis, McCarty served in her later years as chairman of the Board for the Indiana Department of Correction from 1989 until 2006.

== Death and legacy ==
McCarty died on May 26, 2006, in Indianapolis, Indiana, at the age of eighty-one.

McCarty's career in law and public service included her appointment as the first woman to serve a full, four-year term as U.S. Attorney. She was a champion of women's rights and an advocate of equality and equal pay for women. Her advice to other women who aspired to follow her path: "Don't let anybody tell you that you can’t do it because you're a woman. Don't let anyone convince you."

== Honors and awards ==
- 1979, Distinguished Alumni Service Award, Indiana University
- 1979, honorary J.D. degree from Indiana Central College (present-day University of Indianapolis)
- 1986, honorary Doctor of Law from the IU School of Law–Indianapolis (present-day IU Robert H. McKinney School of Law)
- 1987, recipient of Distinguished Alumni Award from IU School of Law–Indianapolis
- 1992, Antoinette Dakin Leach Awards, from Women and the Law Committee, Indiana State Bar Association
- 1996, first Women in the Law Achievement Award from the Indiana State Bar Association, Women Lawyers Committee
- 2000, first Outstanding Alumna of the Year award from the Women's Division of the IU School of Law–Indianapolis

Party political offices
Preceded by Theodore D. Wilson	Democratic nominee for Indiana Attorney General; 1976	Succeeded by Bob Webster
