= Hurley Goodall =

American politician (1927–2021)

Member of the Indiana House of Representatives
- In office November 21, 1978 – 1992
- Preceded by: Leo Voisard (38th district)
- Succeeded by: Frederick Wenger (34th district)
- Constituency: 38th (1978–1982); 34th (1982–1992)

Personal details
- Born: Hurley Charles Goodall Jr. May 23, 1927 Muncie, Indiana, U.S.
- Died: May 12, 2021 (aged 93)
- Party: Democratic
- Spouse: Fredine Wynn
- Children: 2

Hurley Charles Goodall Jr. (May 23, 1927 – May 12, 2021) was an American author, historian, and politician who served in the Indiana House of Representatives from the 38th district as a member of the Democratic Party from 1978 to 1992. Prior to his tenure in the state legislature he was active in local politics and served on the school board in Muncie, Indiana.

Goodall was born in Muncie, and his family relied on welfare due to the death of his father and his brother's polio. He graduated from Muncie Central High School and served in the United States Army for two years. He was active in his local UAW-CIO where he served as its recording secretary and vice-president. He was the first black firefighter in Muncie, served on the city's Human Rights Commission, and was the first and only black member of the Muncie school board until 1993. Goodall was active in city council, county sheriff, and mayoral campaigns.

He was an active member of the Democratic Party and served as the secretary of the Indiana Democratic Party from 1989 to 2004. He formed an organization to work against the reelection of Senator Vance Hartke, served on Birch Bayh's senatorial steering committee in Delaware County, and chaired Baron Hill's senatorial campaign. Goodall served as a delegate to four Democratic National Conventions.

Goodall was elected to the state house in the 1978 election and was served until his retirement during the 1992 election. During his tenure in the state house he was a ranking member on the Labor and Public Safety committees, and served as the assistant Democratic floor leader. He ran for the position of majority floor leader, but was defeated by John R. Gregg. He aided in the foundation of the Indiana Black Legislative Caucus and served as its first chair until his retirement from the state house. During his life he authored multiple books on black history and worked on the editorial board of The Star Press before his death in 2021.

== Early life and education ==
Hurley Charles Goodall Jr. was born in Muncie, Indiana, on May 23, 1927, to Hurley Charles Goodall Sr. and Dorene Mukes. His father died in 1930, causing his family to rely on welfare while his brother Frederick suffered from polio before his death in a car crash and his brother Robert died during the Korean War. His grandmother had been born a slave in 1862. He graduated from Muncie Central High School in 1945, and served in the United States Army for two years until 1947. He was later given an honorary degree from Ball State University. Goodall married Fredine Wynn, with whom he had two children, in 1948. He was a member of the African Methodist Episcopal Church.

== Career ==
=== Early politics ===
Goodall served as recording secretary and vice-president of the UAW-CIO Local 532 and as a delegate to the CIO's convention. He and John Blair became the first black firefighters in Muncie's history when they took their jobs on April 1, 1958. Goodall served on the board of the NAACP in Muncie and on the executive committee of the Indiana NAACP.

Goodall was appointed to the Human Rights Commission by Mayor John Hampton in 1966, and served until he declined to be reappointed in 1969. He was later appointed by the Human Rights Commission to replace Lanny Carmichael as its executive director in 1977. However, the commission voted six to three to appoint Carl C. Wilson as executive director instead after Goodall rejected the position. Goodall was unable to take the position as he held another city job, working for the fire department, and would not be eligible for retirement until January 1978.

=== Local politics ===
Goodall announced on February 13, 1970, that he would run for one of two seats on the Muncie Community School board against incumbents Jack Peckinpaugh and J. Wesley Wray. He won in the election by placing second out of six candidates, behind Peckinpaugh, after spending $1,265 during the campaign and took office on July 1, 1971. He received large amounts of support from majority black precincts with him receiving 550 votes compared to Peckinpaugh's eight and Wray's eleven in the 12th precinct. He was the first black person to serve on the school board in Muncie.

During his tenure on the school board he unsuccessfully attempted to increase the size of the board from five to seven members with four being elected through districts. On the school board Goodall served as secretary from 1972 to 1973, vice-president from 1973 to 1974, and president from 1974 to 1975. In 1972, he was selected to chair the Indiana delegation to the National School Boards Association's national convention. He was selected to serve as chair of the Central Region of the National Caucus of Black School Board Members in 1974, and was one of twenty people chosen to serve on the Indiana School Boards Association's legislative committee in its 1975 session.

He announced on February 15, 1974, that he would not seek reelection and was replaced by Stephen D. Slavin, who took office in 1975. However, Slavin died in a plane crash on November 9, 1975, and Goodall was selected by a unanimous vote to fill the remainder of Slavin's term starting on November 17, and ending on July 1, 1979. John Shepherd, a member of the Delaware County Council, resigned on August 2, 1976, while facing criminal charges and Goodall was mentioned as a possible replacement, but Goodall refused stating that he had a commitment to the school board.

=== Democratic Party ===
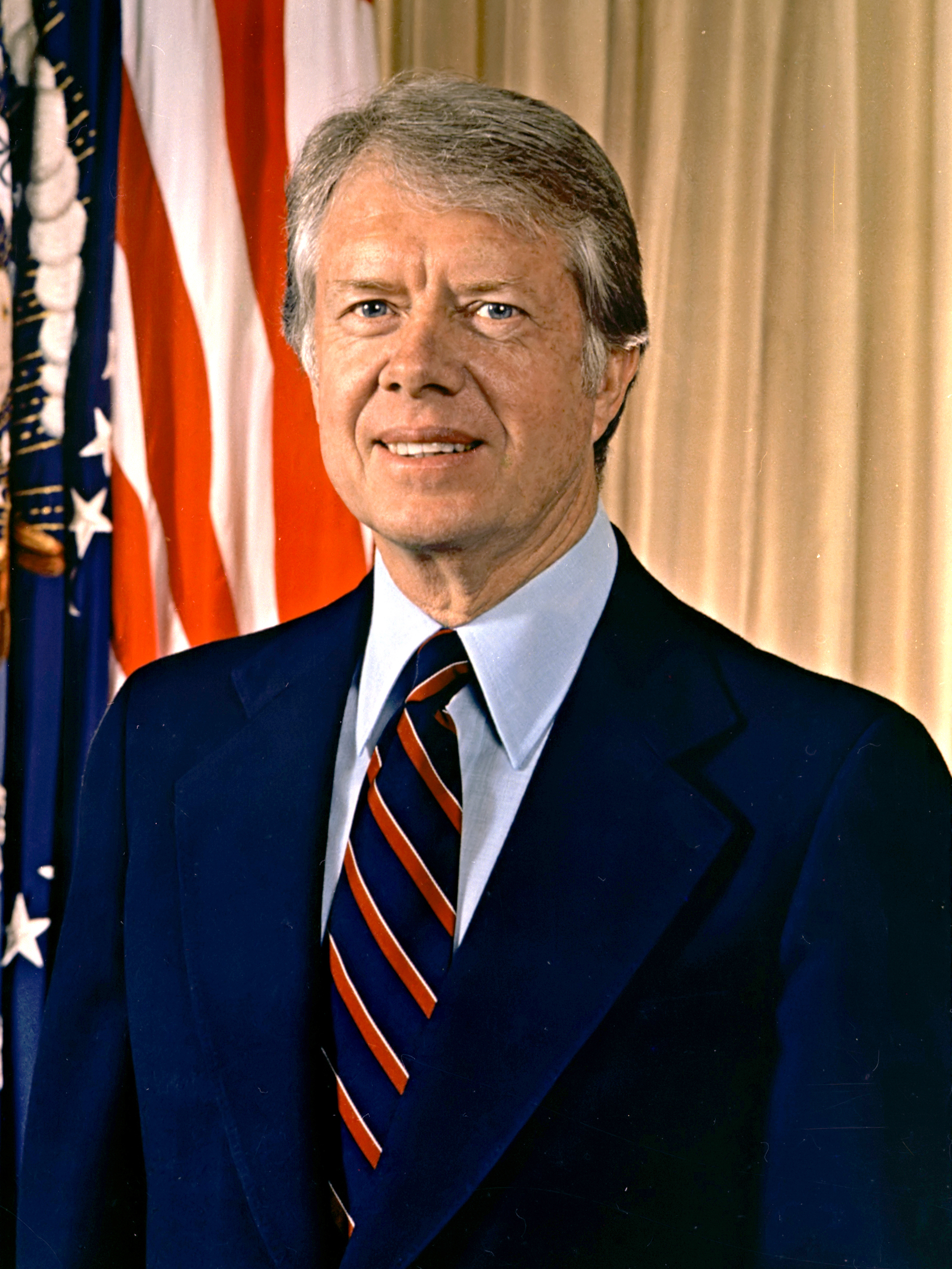
Goodall supported Jimmy Carter in the 1976 and 1980 presidential elections and served as a delegate for him to the Democratic National Conventions.

Goodall was selected to serve as a committeeman from the 12th precinct for the Delaware County Democratic Party. During the 1979 election he served as the chair of James A. Johnson's city council campaign and later the co-chair of his campaign alongside Dan Kelley in 1983. He was the campaign coordinator in Muncie for Richard Heath's county sheriff campaign in the 1982 election. In 1987, he and Ruth Dorer, a Delaware County councilor, were selected to co-chair the precinct coordinating committee for James P. Carey's mayoral election campaign.

He opposed Senator Vance Hartke and formed an organization opposing him in the 1976 election due to Hartke's support for George Wallace's presidential campaign. Goodall supported Senator Birch Bayh during the 1980 election and served in the Indiana Blacks For Senator Birch Bayh committee and Bayh's steering committee in Delaware County. He supported Wayne Townsend during the 1984 gubernatorial election. Goodall was selected to serve as secretary of the Indiana Democratic Party in 1989, and served until his resignation on November 23, 2004. He was selected to serve as the chair of Baron Hill's 1990 senatorial campaign.

During the 1976 Democratic president primary he supported Jimmy Carter and was elected as a delegate for him from Indiana's 10th congressional district to the Democratic National Convention. Although Goodall had received more votes than anybody else running he was not selected to serve as a delegate due to a rule which gave presidential candidates the ability to approve or disapprove delegates. He was not on the approved delegate list and he later stated at a Credentials committee hearing that his "only crime, seems to be that I was not anointed from on high". Joel Ferguson, a member of the Credential committee, stated that the rule was in place to prevent the state parties from sending delegates who did not truly support the candidate, but that the rule should not be used against deserving and duly elected delegates. Senator Alan Cranston, the chair of the committee, praised Goodall stating that he "won the hearts and admiration of the committee" and the committee reprimanded Bill K. Trisler, the chair of the Indiana Democratic Party. He was given a position as an alternate delegate after alternate delegate Ronald E. Davenport took over the position of at-large delegate Beatrice Woods.

During the 1980 Democratic presidential primary he supported Carter and served as a delegate for him from the 10th congressional district to the Democratic National Convention. He criticized Ted Kennedy and his supporters for attempting to change the rules to allow delegates to support the candidate of their own choice instead of the one they were pledged to. He stated that he "would not like to see the convention go back to the smoke-filled rooms". Jack Watson had Goodall ask the Indiana delegation to support a plank at the convention supporting the deployment of the MX missile defense system.

During the 1984 Democratic presidential primary he supported Senator John Glenn and served on Glenn's Indiana steering committee. Goodall and the Indiana Black Legislative Caucus supported a rule change, which was accepted, for the allocation of delegates to reduce the percentage of the vote required to obtain delegates from twenty percent to ten percent. He stated that it was "possible for Mondale to get 45 percent, all the others to get less than 20 percent, and Mondale gets all the delegates". Goodall supported Jesse Jackson after Glenn dropped out.

He served as a temporary member on the credential, platform, and rules committees at the 1988 Democratic National Convention. He served as the chair of the Indiana Coalition for Better Government, an organization that came from the Black Political Caucus that was founded by supporters of Jackson's presidential campaign. During the 1988 Democratic presidential primary the coalition supported Jackson. He served as a delegate to the 1992 Democratic National Convention for Bill Clinton. He was the oldest member of Indiana's delegation to the 2004 Democratic National Convention.

=== Indiana House of Representatives ===
==== Elections ====
During the 1978 election Goodall filed to run for the Democratic nomination for a seat in the Indiana House of Representatives from the 38th district which was seventy-five percent white. The seat was held by Representative Leo Voisard, a member of the Democratic Party. Voisard announced that he would not seek reelection after Goodall filed and he endorsed Larry Dotson, who served as his campaign treasurer during the 1976 election, to succeed him. Johnson served as his campaign chair and Raymond White served as his treasurer.

He defeated Dotson and Doug Collins in the primary and American Party nominee June Osterman in the general election. The Republicans chose to not run a candidate as they believed that an uncontested race would reduce the black vote in other elections. J. C. Williams attempted to run with the Republican nomination, but ended his campaign after he was told that he wouldn't receive support from the party. Goodall was the first black person elected to the state house from Delaware County. He was sworn in on November 21, and resigned from the school board on January 1, 1979, where he was replaced by Bill Burns. No other black person would serve on Muncie's school board until Carl Kizer Jr.'s appointment to the board in 1993.

He was reelected in the 1980 election without opposition. Goodall was reelected without opposition in the 1982 election despite John Hampton, the chair of the Delaware County Republican Party, stating that the Republicans would appoint a candidate as he thought "we've got a shot at beating him".

Goodall announced that he would seek reelection in the 1984 election on January 28, 1984, the same day that J.A. Cummins, a public defender, announced that he would challenge him in the Democratic primary. Kelly, a former member of the city council, served as Goodall's campaign manager while White served as his treasurer. He defeated Cummins, Robert Raines, Edgar Smith, and George Boxell in the Democratic primary while winning a majority in every precinct except for two majority white ones where he received a plurality. He defeated Republican nominee Mark Anthony in the general election after raising $7,385 during the campaign compared to Anthony's $491.

He defeated Republican nominee Stephen Ramsey, a union organizer, in the 1986 election after raising $10,500 during the campaign compared to Ramsey's $1,100. Gary R. Rice, a member of the Delaware-Muncie Metropolitan Plan Commission, had initially ran against Goodall with the Republican nomination, but dropped out on July 17, 1986, citing his workload and Ramsey was selected to replace Rice by a unanimous vote. He defeated Republican nominee Herbert A. Vollmar in the 1988 election after spending $4,400 compared to Vollmar's $3,900. He won in the 1990 election without opposition after raising $12,018 and spending $4,364. Goodall announced on November 25, 1991, that he would not seek reelection and Republican nominee Frederick Wenger was elected to succeed him. A Democrat wouldn't be elected from the district until Tiny Adams won in the 1996 election.

==== Tenure ====
During Goodall's tenure in the state house he served on the Cities and Towns, Election and Apportionment, Labor, Public Safety, and Financial Institutions committees. He was the ranking minority member on the Labor and Public Safety committees. He served as vice-chair of the Labor committee and co-chair of the Public Safety committee alongside Representative John Matonovich. Goodall was selected to serve as the assistant Democratic floor leader in 1988. Goodall was selected to serve as the assistant Democratic floor leader in 1988. He ran for the position of majority floor leader in 1990, but lost on the first ballot to John R. Gregg.

In 1980, he was subpoenaed as a character witness in a trial for Willie J. Seals and Albert Dew who were accused of selling stolen luxury cars. Goodall was selected to serve as the first chair of the Indiana Caucus of Black Democratic Elected Officials in 1980. He was one of the founding members of the Indiana Black Legislative Caucus and served as its chair until his retirement.

Governor Robert D. Orr appointed him to serve on the Indiana Job Training Coordinating Council in 1984. He was appointed to serve on the Indiana Economic Development Council by Governor Evan Bayh in 1990.

== Later life ==
Goodall was diagnosed with prostate cancer after returning from the 1992 Democratic National Convention. His autobiography, Inside the House: My Years in the Indiana Legislature, was released in 1995, and he later published Voices from the Past, a book about the lives of former slaves, in 2000. He worked as a visiting scholar to Ball State University and was selected to serve for three months as the first citizens' representative on the editorial board of The Star Press. His wife died in 2009, and Goodall died on May 12, 2021.

== Political positions ==
Goodall had met Martin Luther King Jr. during the Montgomery bus boycott and later supported legislation to create a holiday in his honor.

Goodall proposed a constitutional amendment in the state house to require certain appointments by the governor to be approved by the Indiana Senate. The state legislature passed a resolution written by Goodall which praised Carter for the freeing of the fifty-two hostages held during the Iran hostage crisis. He voted against legislation to lower the minimum age to serve as a state representative from twenty-one to eighteen.

He supported removing the sales tax on residential utilities. In 1982, Goodall sponsored legislation alongside Representatives B. Patrick Bauer and Stan Jones to increase taxes to prevent a $452.1 million budget deficit. He supported repealing the ban on lotteries in the Constitution of Indiana and supported legislation to allow residents of Gary, Indiana, to hold a referendum on whether or not to legalize casino gambling. The National Federation of Independent Business gave Goodall a score of 50% in 1986.

He was endorsed by the AFL–CIO during the 1980 election and the organization later gave him a 100% score in 1984. Goodall and Representative Merle O. Brown introduced legislation to allow for collective bargaining by government workers. He stated that success for black people in society relied on black churches or organized labor and that he thought "every black member of the Muncie City Council has come from organized labor".

Goodall accused the Republicans of reducing the voting power of minorities during redistricting after the 1980 census. He criticized their plan for splitting minorities into different congressional districts such as splitting Anderson and Muncie from being together in the 10th congressional district into the 2nd and 6th congressional districts. He was also critical of the creation of multi-member districts with three representatives being elected stating that those districts combined two white suburban areas with one minority urban area. Goodall and Representative Bill Crawford proposed legislation to create single member districts in 1983. He introduced legislation to implement a none of the above on general election ballots for all offices. Goodall sponsored legislation written by Representative Marc Carmichael which would allow for same-day voter registration.

He introduced legislation targeting the Ku Klux Klan which would have made acting with malice against people based on race, color, or religion while disguised or burning a cross a class D felony with a punishment up to four years in prison and a $10,000 fine. Crawford, Goodall, and civil rights activists asked the United States Department of Justice to investigate two incidents at the Indiana State Reformatory where five inmates were stripped naked and beaten by fifteen to twenty guards. The Indiana Civil Liberties Union gave him a score of 100% in 1984. During his tenure in the state house he sponsored legislation to recognize a holiday in honor of Martin Luther King Jr., who he had met during the Montgomery bus boycott, before it was adopted in Indiana in 1986.

The National Organization for Women endorsed him during the 1984 election and donated $700 to his campaign. In 1990, the state house voted fifty-six to forty-three, with Goodall against, in favor of legislation to prohibit the use of public facilities and employees for abortions, abortions after twenty weeks with the exception of rape, incest, or to save the woman's life, and to implement a twenty-four hour waiting period.

Goodall sponsored legislation to guarantee the First Amendment rights for student newspapers and yearbooks in 1991, after the Supreme Court of the United States ruled in a case that an administrator's censorship of a student publication did not violate the student's freedom of speech. The legislation passed in the state house, but failed in the state senate. The legislation was later passed as an amendment to legislation requiring immunizations for students, teachers, and school employees in 1992.

== Electoral history ==
1970 Muncie, Indiana school board election
| Party | Candidate | Votes | % |
|---|---|---|---|
| Nonpartisan | Jack Peckinpaugh | 4,509 | 24.16% |
| Nonpartisan | Hurley Goodall | 4,281 | 22.94% |
| Nonpartisan | John Wesley Wray | 3,656 | 19.59% |
| Nonpartisan | Carolyn Kelley | 3,119 | 16.71% |
| Nonpartisan | Jack Perkins | 2,272 | 12.17% |
| Nonpartisan | Christina Delaney | 826 | 4.43% |
| Total votes | | 18,663 | 100.00% |

1978 Indiana House of Representatives 38th district election
Primary election
| Party | Candidate | Votes | % |
|---|---|---|---|
| Democratic | Hurley Goodall | 2,011 | 39.47% |
| Democratic | Doug Collins | 1,867 | 36.64% |
| Democratic | Larry Dotson | 1,217 | 23.89% |
| Total votes | | 5,095 | 100.00% |
General election
| Democratic | Hurley Goodall | 6,913 | 80.44% |
| American | June Osterman | 1,681 | 19.56% |
| Total votes | | 8,594 | 100.00% |

1980 Indiana House of Representatives 38th district election
| Party | Candidate | Votes | % |
|---|---|---|---|
| Democratic | Hurley Goodall (incumbent) | 11,668 | 100.00% |
| Total votes | | 11,668 | 100.00% |

1982 Indiana House of Representatives 34th district election
Primary election
| Party | Candidate | Votes | % |
|---|---|---|---|
| Democratic | Hurley Goodall (incumbent) | 6,352 | 100.00% |
| Total votes | | 6,352 | 100.00% |
General election
| Democratic | Hurley Goodall (incumbent) | 10,316 | 100.00% |
| Total votes | | 10,316 | 100.00% |

1984 Indiana House of Representatives 34th district election
Primary election
| Party | Candidate | Votes | % |
|---|---|---|---|
| Democratic | Hurley Goodall (incumbent) | 6,350 | 64.67% |
| Democratic | J.A. Cummins | 1,950 | 19.86% |
| Democratic | Robert Raines | 573 | 5.84% |
| Democratic | Edgar Smith | 506 | 5.15% |
| Democratic | George Boxell | 440 | 4.48% |
| Total votes | | 9,819 | 100.00% |
General election
| Democratic | Hurley Goodall (incumbent) | 13,267 | 65.91% |
| Republican | Mark Anthony | 6,862 | 34.09% |
| Total votes | | 20,129 | 100.00% |

1986 Indiana House of Representatives 34th district election
| Party | Candidate | Votes | % |
|---|---|---|---|
| Democratic | Hurley Goodall (incumbent) | 10,633 | 71.92% |
| Republican | Stephen Ramsey | 4,152 | 28.08% |
| Total votes | | 14,785 | 100.00% |

1988 Indiana House of Representatives 34th district election
Primary election
| Party | Candidate | Votes | % |
|---|---|---|---|
| Democratic | Hurley Goodall (incumbent) | 7,709 | 100.00% |
| Total votes | | 7,709 | 100.00% |
General election
| Democratic | Hurley Goodall (incumbent) | 12,807 | 70.35% |
| Republican | Herbert Vollmar | 5,397 | 29.65% |
| Total votes | | 18,204 | 100.00% |

1990 Indiana House of Representatives 34th district election
| Party | Candidate | Votes | % |
|---|---|---|---|
| Democratic | Hurley Goodall (incumbent) | 10,163 | 100.00% |
| Total votes | | 10,163 | 100.00% |

== Bibliography ==
- A History of Negroes in Muncie (1976)
- The Other Side of Town in Middletown (1994)
- Inside the House: My Years in the Indiana Legislature (1995)
- African American Pioneers on the Muncie Fire Department: A First Hand Account (1997)
- A Comprehensive Look at the People of Delaware County (1999)
- Voices from the Past: A Collection of References to African American Community in the State of Indiana (2000)
- Underground Railroad: The Invisible Road to Freedom Through Indiana (2000)
- Those Who Made a Difference: Volume 1 (2003)
