= 1980 Indiana gubernatorial election =

- November 4, 1980
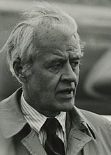

Nominee	Robert D. Orr	John A. Hillenbrand II
Party	Republican	Democratic
Popular vote	1,257,383	913,116
Percentage	57.72%	41.92%
- County results Orr: 50–60% 60–70% 70–80% Hillenbrand: 50–60% 60–70%
Governor before election
Otis Bowen
Republican
Elected Governor
Robert D. Orr
Republican

The 1980 Indiana gubernatorial election was held on November 4, 1980, in all 92 counties in the state of Indiana. Otis Bowen, the state's incumbent governor was ineligible for a third consecutive term due to term limits set forth in the Indiana Constitution. Robert D. Orr, the state's incumbent Republican lieutenant governor, was elected to his first term, defeating John A. Hillenbrand II, and a minor party challenger.

== Democratic primary ==
=== Candidates ===
==== Announced ====
- John A. Hillenbrand II, businessman
- Wayne Townsend, state senator

==== Declined ====
- Floyd Fithian, United States Representative from 2nd District

Two candidates emerged to contest the Democratic gubernatorial nomination in 1980. These were John A. Hillenbrand, a businessman from Batesville, Indiana, and Wayne Townsend, who had previously served three terms in the Indiana State Senate. Hillenbrand defeated Townsend by a relatively narrow margin of 26,403 votes, or less than five percent of all votes cast. Townsend would go on to win the Democratic nomination for governor in 1984.

=== Results ===
1980 Indiana Democratic gubernatorial primary election
Party	Candidate	Votes	%
Democratic	John A. Hillenbrand II	284,182	52.44
Democratic	Wayne Townsend	257,779	47.56

== General election ==
Indiana gubernatorial election, 1980
Party	Candidate	Votes	%	±%
Republican	Robert D. Orr	1,257,383	57.72%	+0.87
Democratic	John A. Hillenbrand II	913,116	41.92%	−0.71
American	Cletis Artist	7,904	0.36%	−0.09
Majority		344,267		
Republican hold		Swing		
