= Toga, Missouri =

Unincorporated community in Missouri, U.S.

Coordinates: 37°06′58″N 89°53′05″W

Toga is an unincorporated community located on Crowleys Ridge in northern Stoddard County, in the U.S. state of Missouri. The community lies two miles northeast of Advance on Missouri Route 25. The Stoddard-Bollinger-Cape Girardeau county line junction is approximately one mile northeast of the location.

== History ==
A post office called Toga was established in 1900, and remained in operation until 1903. The community has the first name of Toga Bill Rhodes, an early settler.

== Notable person ==
- Gene Rhodes (1926–2014), former mayor of Cape Girardeau, Missouri, who founded Rhodes Oil Companies in 1963, was born in Toga.
