= Bust of Robert D. Orr =

Bust by American artist Don Ingle

Robert D. Orr
- Artist: Jon Ingle
- Year: 1987
- Type: Bronze, political sculpture
- Dimensions: 76.2 cm × 38.1 cm × 53.34 cm (30 in × 15 in × 21 in)
- Location: Indiana State House; Indianapolis, Indiana, United States; 39.768611°N 86.1625°W
- Owner: State of Indiana

Robert D. Orr is a public artwork by American artist Jon Ingle which is located on the Indiana State House: Fourth Floor Rotunda, which is near Indianapolis, Indiana, United States of America. The bust is a bronze political sculpture of Robert D. Orr, the 45th Governor of Indiana. Created in 1987, the bust was a gift by the Rotary International chapter of Evansville, Indiana. The bust measures 30 x 21 x 15 in.; 76.2 x 53.34 x 38.1 cm.

== Description ==
The bronze bust is a 1.5 scale portrait of Robert D. Orr from the mid-chest and above. The bust is made of bronze with a wax patina and was cast with the Lost-wax casting method. Orr is looking forward smiling. The bust contains great detail in the face which includes wrinkles around the eyes and mouth. He is dressed in a collared shirt, tie, and blazer. There is a defined pin on his proper left lapel which represents the Rotary International club. He has a slightly receding hairline with hair parted on the right. The edges of the shoulders seem to be unfinished. They appear to have a bumpy display and is not congruent to the smooth, sharp edges of the tie and blazer. There is a Foundry mark on the proper right, back of the bust. On the proper front right lapel is the artist's signature (Jon Ingle) and the date 1987.

Directly beneath the bust is the base which reads "Robert D. Orr Governor 1981-1989". The bust measures 30 x 21 x 15 in.; 76.2 x 53.34 x 38.1 cm.

Below the sculpture, attached to the wall, is a plaque that gives the dedication information of the bust.
The plaque reads:

ROBERT D. ORR
Governor
State of Indiana
1981-1989
Presented by the Rotary Club of
Evansville to the State of Indiana
Jon Ingle, Sculptor

== Historical information ==
The cast-bronze bust was commissioned by the Rotary of Evansville. Evansville was Governor Orr's hometown and he was an active member of the Rotary of Evansville before his first election in 1979. The bust was sculpted by Jon Ingle for $6,000. The artist of the bust was Jonathan (Jon) Ingle from Evansville, Indiana. Ingle has completed previous bronze busts including Don Powers, Purdue University's first band director Paul Spotts Emrick, and other Indiana figures.

The Governor Robert Orr and the Artist Jon Ingle grew up together in Evansville and were lifelong friends. The governor came to Evansville to sit for Mr. Ingle on 2 occasions in 1987. Prior to the sittings, Mr. Ingle had the Governor sit for formal head portraits taken by a professional photographer. Molding the sculpture to Mr. Ingle 3 months, working 4–5 hours each day, including weekends. The finished mold was sent to a foundry in Lancaster, Pa. This process of turning the mold in the finished bust took about two months. The bust was presented to the Governor in 1988 at a ceremony at the Indianapolis Athletic Club. Two busts were prepared, one is now in the Rotunda of the Indiana State Capitol Building, and the second copy is displayed in the lobby of the Orr Academic Building at the University of Southern Indiana.

=== Location history ===
Prior to January 5, 1989, the bust was on available for public viewing at the University of Southern Indiana. The bust replaced a previous bust of Governor Otis Bowen (Lanagan) who was the 44th governor of Indiana. The bust is currently located at the Indiana Statehouse on the 3rd floor rotunda directly across the Senate Chambers.
