= National Lieutenant Governors Association =

- Formation: 1962
- Headquarters: Covington, Kentucky
- Website: https://nlga.us/

The National Lieutenant Governors Association (NLGA) is the non-profit, nonpartisan professional association for elected or appointed officials who are first in line of succession to the governors in the 50 U.S. states and the five organized territories. The first official in the line of succession is generally established in the state or territorial constitution.

== Lieutenant governors ==
In 43 states and four territories, this official is a statewide elected lieutenant governor (In 2010 New Jersey elected its first lieutenant governor). In three states and one territory, this official is the state secretary of state. In four states, the president of the state senate (the upper house of the state legislature) is first in line of succession; two of these officials (Tennessee and West Virginia) may statutorily use the title lieutenant governor.

Of the elected lieutenant governors, 26 are elected on a ticket in the general election with the gubernatorial candidate as a running mate. Most states allow the governor to designate his or her running mate, but in some states, the governor and lieutenant governor run separately in the primary election and are "paired" for the general election. In 17 other states, the lieutenant governor and the governor are elected separately and as a result may be of different political parties. Lieutenant governors typically are acting governor when the governor is out of state. Thirty lieutenant governor are presidents of the state Senate, and of these half may cast tie-breaking votes (mirroring the Federal government of the United States, in which the Vice President of the United States is the president of the United States Senate).

== History ==
The organization was founded in 1962 as the National Conference of Lieutenant Governors (NCLG). The organization's first meeting was on December 4, 1962. In 1966, NCLG affiliated with the Council of State Governments (CSG) and was staffed through CSG from 1983 to 1988 with Edward Feigenbaum as director. In 1988, NCLG became financially independent. Gail Manning ran the organization's operations and was named director in 1991; serving until 2002.

In 2002, Julia Hurst became executive director. The same year, the organization adopted its current name and a new logo and launched its website.

The Association was incorporated in Kentucky in January 2013 and assumed independent corporate status and operations on July 1, 2013.

== Functions ==
NLGA provides members the opportunity to network, meet, foster interstate cooperation, gain policy knowledge, hone professional skills, share policy work, and promote the effectiveness of the office of lieutenant governor. NLGA does adopt national policy resolutions on subjects of importance to the membership. NLGA Articles provide for the Chairmanship to rotate annually between a Democrat and Republican. The Chair Elect is of the opposite party to the chair and assumes the role of Chair the following year.

The association office is located in Covington, Kentucky. The full membership meets twice a year, annually in Washington, DC for its Federal-State Relations meeting and annually in the summer in a select host state.

In 2007, NLGA was given the prestigious 'Associations Advance America' recognition by the American Society of Association Executives (ASAE). NLGA was determined to have one of the six best association programs in the nation for 'Ending Cervical Cancer in our Lifetime,' a nationwide health care campaign. NLGA has also been recognized for work by Women in Government, the American Cardiology Association, and the American Iron and Steel Institute.

== List of chairs of the NLGA ==
Chairs of the National Lieutenant Governors Association
#	Term	Office holder	State	Party
1st	1962–1963	Samuel H. Shapiro	Illinois	Democratic
2nd	1963–1964	Harold H. Chase	Kansas	Republican
3rd	1964–1965	Robert Evander McNair	South Carolina	Democratic
4th	1965–1966	John William Brown	Ohio	Republican
5th	1966–1967	Harry Lee Waterfield	Kentucky	Democratic
6th	1967–1968	Malcolm Wilson	New York	Republican
7th	1968–1969	John Cherberg	Washington	Democratic
8th	1969–1970	Raymond J. Broderick	Pennsylvania	Republican
9th	1970–1971	George Nigh	Oklahoma	Democratic
10th	1971–1972	Roger W. Jepsen	Iowa	Republican
11th	1972	Thomas Lee Judge	Montana	Democratic
12th	1972–1973	Martin J. Schreiber	Wisconsin	Democratic
13th	1973–1974	Edwin Reinecke	California	Republican
14th	1974–1975	Julian Carroll	Kentucky	Democratic
15th	1975	Blair Lee III	Maryland	Democratic
16th	1975–1976	Eugene Bookhammer	Delaware	Republican
17th	1976–1977	William P. Hobby Jr.	Texas	Democratic
18th	1977–1978	Robert D. Orr	Indiana	Republican
19th	1978–1979	Thomas P. O'Neill III	Massachusetts	Democratic
20th	1979–1980	William C. Phelps	Missouri	Republican
21st	1980–1981	Charles S. Robb	Virginia	Democratic
22nd	1981–1982	Mike Curb	California	Republican
23rd	1982–1983	Martha Layne Collins	Kentucky	Democratic
24th	1983–1984	William W. Scranton III	Pennsylvania	Republican
25th	1984–1985	Zell Miller	Georgia	Democratic
26th	1985–1986	John Mutz	Indiana	Republican
27th	1986–1987	Winston Bryant	Arkansas	Democratic
28th	1987–1988	George Ryan	Illinois	Republican
29th	1988–1989	Steve McAlpine	Alaska	Democratic
30th	1989–1990	Bobby Brantley	Florida	Republican
31st	1990–1991	Jim Folsom Jr.	Alabama	Democratic
32nd	1991–1992	Scott McCallum	Wisconsin	Republican
33rd	1992–1993	Frank O'Bannon	Indiana	Democratic
34th	1993–1994	Joanell Dyrstad	Minnesota	Republican
35th	1994–1995	Melinda Schwegmann	Louisiana	Democratic
36th	1995–1996	Joy Corning	Iowa	Republican
37th	1996–1997	Kim Robak	Nebraska	Democratic
38th	1997–1998	Mary Fallin	Oklahoma	Republican
39th	1998–1999	Ronnie Musgrove	Mississippi	Democratic
40th	1999–2000	Olene Walker	Utah	Republican
41st	2000–2001	Steve Henry	Kentucky	Democratic
42nd	2001–2002	Gary Sherrer	Kansas	Republican
43rd	2002–2003	Charles Fogarty	Rhode Island	Democratic
44th	2003–2004	Karl Ohs	Montana	Republican
45th	2004–2005	John Carney	Delaware	Democratic
46th	2005–2006	Jane Norton	Colorado	Republican
47th	2006–2007	John D. Cherry	Michigan	Democratic
48th	2007–2008	Jack Dalrymple	North Dakota	Republican
49th	2008–2009	Barbara Lawton	Wisconsin	Democratic
50th	2009–2010	Bill Bolling	Virginia	Republican
51st	2010–2011	Anthony Brown	Maryland	Democratic
52nd	2011–2012	Rick Sheehy	Nebraska	Republican
53rd	2012–2013	Tim Murray	Massachusetts	Democratic
54th	2013–2014	Todd Lamb	Oklahoma	Republican
55th	2014–2015	Nancy Wyman	Connecticut	Democratic
56th	2015–2016	Kim Reynolds	Iowa	Republican
57th	2016–2017	Dan McKee	Rhode Island	Democratic
58th	2017–2018	Matt Michels	South Dakota	Republican
59th	2018–2019	Mike Cooney	Montana	Democratic
60th	2019–2020	Billy Nungesser	Louisiana	Republican
61st	2020–2021	Bethany Hall-Long	Delaware	Democratic
62nd	2021–2022	Mike Foley	Nebraska	Republican
63rd	2022–2023	Juliana Stratton	Illinois	Democratic
64th	2023–2024	Adam Gregg	Iowa	Republican
65th	2024–2025	Garlin Gilchrist	Michigan	Democratic
66th	2025–present	Pamela Evette	South Carolina	Republican
	chair-elect	Jacqueline Coleman	Kentucky	Democratic
