= George C. Thilenius =

American politician

Member of the Missouri House of Representatives from the Cape Girardeau County district
- Preceded by: J. J. Sawyer
- Succeeded by: Robert Burett Oliver Sr.

Personal details
- Born: George Christian Thilenius; August 20, 1829 Kingdom of Hanover
- Died: July 7, 1910 (aged 80) Cape Girardeau, Missouri, U.S.
- Party: Republican
- Spouse: Margaret Fromann Thilenius
- Occupation: politician, soldier, merchant, miller, vintager, soda manufacturer

George Christian Thilenius (August 20, 1829 – July 7, 1910) was a German-born American politician, soldier, and businessman from the state of Missouri. He is known for the being a Missouri state representative, mayor of Cape Girardeau, Missouri, and for the Colonel George C. Thilenius House which is listed on the National Register of Historic Places.

== Biography ==
=== Early life ===
Born in the Kingdom of Hanover, his merchant father was also named George Christian Thilenius. He attended private school in Hanover and at age 15 became a merchant apprentice in the city of Göttingen. After the failed Revolutions of 1848, his family fled to St. Louis, Missouri, where he and his father opened a store. He came to Missouri on May 5, 1848. In 1853, he traveled to Cuba where stayed for three years working in the sugar refining business. When he returned to Missouri, he moved to the city of Cape Girardeau where he entered into partnership in a general store business. On March 8, 1857, he married Margaret Fromann with whom he eventually had four children.

=== Military life ===
Like most German-Americans in Missouri, he sided with the Union during the American Civil War. He served three months in the Union Army and three years in the state militia. Thilenius was present at the Battle of Camp Jackson. When he returned to Cape Girardeau, he helped to organize a mostly German local militia unit known as the Cape Home Guard, and he was elected first lieutenant. He eventually was promoted to the rank of colonel. Thilenius recruited 110 local civilians to construct four forts in Cape Girardeau.

On November 19, 1864, Lieutenant Colonel George Thilenius led the 56th Missouri militia in a skirmish at Reeves' Mill in Wayne County, Missouri, and the following day he led them in a skirmish at Buckskull in Randolph County, Arkansas.

=== Political life ===
Thilenius was elected as the Missouri House of Representatives and was a member of the 40th General Assembly. He represented the Cape Girardeau County district, was a member of the Constitutional Convention of 1865, and was one of 61 men who signed the historic ordinance abolishing slavery in Missouri. Thilenius also served as the Republican mayor of Cape Girardeau from 1867 to 1873 where he was instrumental in establishing the first public elementary school for the city and in bringing Southeast Missouri State Normal School (the future Southeast Missouri State University) to Cape Girardeau. At the end of the 19th century, he was again elected to the Missouri House of Representatives two more times, defeating former Jackson mayor Jefferson W. Limbaugh Jr. in 1898 and former U.S. Representative Robert Henry Whitelaw in 1900. He was succeeded in office by Robert Burett Oliver, the husband of Marie Watkins Oliver who designed and created the current Missouri State Flag.

=== Business Ventures ===
In 1866, Colonel Thilenius constructed a flour mill on Broadway Street in Cape Girardeau. In 1873, his flour won the Medal of Merit at the 1873 Vienna World's Fair in Austria, and in 1876 it was awarded first prize at the Centennial Exposition in Philadelphia. His home included a winery which produced sparkling champagne cider, and he was the first person in Cape Girardeau to produce soda pop. His brother Edward was also a miller or flour mill manager near Perryville, Missouri, and lived with his brother Herman Brandes who was a saddler.

=== Death ===
Thilenius died on July 7, 1910, while his wife Margaret had died about 16 months earlier. Their bodies were cremated with the remains buried in the Old Lorimier Cemetery in Cape Girardeau, Missouri.

== Links ==
- Colonel George C. Thilenius House
- List of mayors of Cape Girardeau, Missouri
- Photo
