= Thilenius =

Thilenius is a surname. Notable people with the surname include:

- Ed Thilenius (1923–1981), American sport announcer
- Georg Thilenius (1868–1937) German physician and anthropologist
- George C. Thilenius (1829–1910), German-born American politician, soldier and businessman
