= List of mayors of Cape Girardeau, Missouri =

The city of Cape Girardeau is the most populous city in Missouri's 8th congressional district and southeastern Missouri, which is sometimes known as the Missouri Bootheel.

== List of mayors ==
Cape Girardeau mayors since 1843, when the city was incorporated:

Mayor	Took office	Left office	Additional information
E. Mason	1843	1844	
George Washington Juden, Sr. (1805–1844)	1844	1844	First elected mayor
E. Mason	1844	1846	2nd term (previously served as mayor, 1843–1844)
Thomas Johnston (1804–after 1870)	1846	1849	Some sources spell his name as Johnson.
Dr. Patrick Henry Davis (1803–1852)	1849	1851	He was the publisher of the Southern Advocate and State Journal, originally an 1819 newspaper which was the second-oldest Missouri newspaper outside of St. Louis.
Alfred T. Lacey (c.1821–1878)	1851	1852	During the Civil War, this bank president moved his family to Memphis, where he remained after the war.
Thomas Baldwin	1852	1853	
John C. Watson (1796–1866)	1853	1854	Captain Watson was a Mississippi River boat pilot for 24 years.
Amasa Alton (1810–1855)	1854	1855	
C. T. Gale	1855	1857	
John Ivers, Jr. (1824–1885)	1857	1860	
John Albert	1860	1862	In 1860, he tried to create the city fire department, but the city fire department was not officially established until 1866.
George H. Cramer (1820–1892)	1862	1867	Son of one of the county's first German settlers. In June 1861, he organized and led a battalion of four Union companies. In 1867, he became a member of Cape Girardeau's first school board. He was the father of Wilson Cramer, Cape Girardeau County prosecuting attorney 1873–1874.
George C. Thilenius (1829–1910)	1867	1873	The Colonel George C. Thilenius House is on the National Register of Historic Places.
Edward D. Engelmann (1830–1898)	1873	1877	He was from Hanover, Germany, and came to the United States in 1840. He was a clerk of the court of common pleas at Cape Girardeau for 18 years. His son Edward H. Engelmann was also a clerk of the court of common pleas at Cape Girardeau.
Leon Joseph Albert (1840–1912)	1877	1879	He spoke French and German and built the Alfred T. Lacy, named after a previous mayor. This was the only steamboat ever built at Cape Girardeau. Author Mark Twain served as a co-pilot on the Alfred T. Lacy. Albert Hall (1905–1960), the first dormitory on Southeast Missouri State University, was named after him.
George H. Cramer (1820–1892)	1879	1886	2nd term (previously served as mayor, 1862–1867)
Leon Joseph Albert (1840–1912)	1886	1891	2nd term (previously served as mayor, 1877–1879)
Harlan P. Pieronnet (1852–1912)	1891	1895	
William H. Coerver (1848–1940)	1895	1901	He was a druggist for 50 years. His Broadway Street house was later converted into Schulz Surgical Hospital, until the opening of Southeast Missouri Hospital in 1928.
Dr. John D. Porterfield (1843–1922)	1901	1903	He was educated at Jefferson Medical College in Philadelphia and Missouri Medical College in St. Louis. Porterfield retired as a doctor in 1906. His father and three sons all became doctors. He was also president of the Cape Girardeau Water Works and Electric Light Company.
Rodney Gayso Whitelaw (1859–1922)	1903	1905	He may be related to former congressman and Cape Girardeau County prosecuting attorney Robert Henry Whitelaw (1854–1937).
William H. Coerver (1848–1940)	1905	1907	2nd term (previously served as mayor, 1895–1901)
Dr. Warren C. Patton (1858–1928)	1907	1909	
Merit E. Leming (1862–1938)	1909	1911	After serving on a dormitory association, Leming Hall (1905–1972), the first women's dormitory on Southeast Missouri State University, was named after him.
Frederick A. Kage (1848–1932)	1911	1917	Cape Girardeau County sheriff, 1882–1886. He served in city and county government for 63 years.
William Hirsch (1866–1939)	1917	1918	He was born in Madison, Indiana; his father was born in Germany. He was a pioneer merchant, a county judge, a bank president, and president of the Chamber of Commerce.
Henry Harl Haas (1878–1935)	1918	1922	First mayor under the municipal form of government. He resigned to become postmaster for 12 years. In 1934, he was defeated in a mayor election by 325 votes.
James Alexander Barks (1879–1936)	1922	1930	
Edward L. Drum (1875–1955)	1930	1936	Cape Girardeau County prosecuting attorney, 1937
Charles G. Wilson	1936	1938	He finished third in the 1934 mayoral election behind mayor Edward Drum and former mayor Henry Haas.
Edward L. Drum (1875–1955)	1938	1940	2nd term (previously served as mayor, 1930–1936)
W. Hinkle Statler (1909–1962)	1940	1942	Elected at the age of 30, he became the city's youngest mayor at that time.
Raymond E. Beckman (1896–1971)	1942	1948	He became acting mayor while Hinkle Statler was serving in the military during World War II.
Walter H. "Doc" Ford (1910–1968)	1948	1952	He was given the nickname "Doc" as his father was a Gordonville doctor.
Manning P. Greer	1952	1954	
Narvol A. Randol (1916–1999)	1954	1956	He was a lieutenant colonel and battalion commander at the Battle of the Bulge. In 1971, he retired as a brigadier general in the Missouri National Guard.
Walter H. "Doc" Ford (1910–1968)	1956	1964	2nd term (previously served as mayor, 1948–1952)
Waddy Elmo Davis (1903–1992)	1964	1965	
Charles A. Hood (1906–1996)	1965	1966	In 1965, he purchased the historic St. Charles Hotel where guests reportedly had included Ulysses S. Grant, Mark Twain, and Charles Dickens. Born in Cape Girardeau, he worked as a general contractor, a millworker, and in the retail grocery business.
J. Ronald Fischer (1933–2026)	1966	1967	Cape Girardeau city manager, 1988–1995. At age 32 he became the second-youngest person to serve as mayor of Cape Girardeau. He served in the US Navy during the Korean War.
James Hugh Logan	1967	1968	First executive director of the Southeast Missouri Hospital Foundation, 1977–85, and president of the hospital's board of directors, 1986–1989.
A. Robert Price	1968	1969	
Ivan L. Irvin (1934–2008)	1969	1970	He served on the Missouri Real Estate Commission, 1987–1992.
Howard C. Tooke (1918–2006)	1970	1978	
Paul W. Stehr (1936–2023)	1978	1981	Stehr grew up in Cape Girardeau and died at age 87 in Charlotte, North Carolina. He won the MVP trophy after his Cape Central team won the state high school basketball championship in 1954. Stehr opened a clothing and athletic store, worked in the insurance business, and served as a captain in the U.S. Marine Corps. Acting city manager, 1981.
Howard C. Tooke (1918–2006)	1981	1986	2nd term (previously served as mayor, 1970–1978)
Francis E. "Gene" Rhodes (1926–2014)	1986	1994	In 1963, he founded Rhodes Oil Companies, which runs Rhodes 101 Stop gas stations and convenience stores. He served in the U.S. Army in the Pacific Theatre during World War II.
Albert M. Spradling, III	1994	2002	Son of Missouri state senator Albert Spradling, Jr.
Jay Knudtson	2002	2010	Banker and Southeast Missouri State University Board of Regents member (2011–2018)
Harry Rediger (1937–2024)	2010	2018	Former manager of the J. C. Penney in Cape Girardeau. Many years on the United Way Board of Directors. He was born in Seward, Nebraska, and later served in the Naval Reserve.
Bob Fox	2018	2022	Former city councilman of Cape Girardeau
Stacy Blakeslee Kinder	2022	2026	First female mayor of Cape Girardeau, former councilwoman, and former member of the Cape Girardeau School Board
Robbie Guard	2026	-	He has worked as a banker.

== Notable city managers for Cape Girardeau ==
City managers	Took office	Left office	Additional information
Paul F. Frederick	1966	1970	First Cape Girardeau city manager. He was from Minot, North Dakota.
W. G. Lawley	1970	1980	
Paul Stehr	1981	1981	Acting city manager. Mayor of Cape Girardeau, 1978–1981.
Gary A. Eide	1981	1987	
J. Ronald Fischer	1988	1995	Mayor of Cape Girardeau, 1966–1967
Michael G. Miller	1995	2003	Died in 2017
Doug Leslie	2003	2009	
Scott A. Meyer	2009	2020	Former director of facilities management at Southeast Missouri State University
Kenneth Haskin	2021	present	City manager of Texarkana, Texas 2013–2021, and Texarkana's assistant city manager and director of economic development 2008–2013

== Notable members of the Cape Girardeau city council ==
- David Limbaugh, commentator and author who served as a member of the Cape Girardeau City Council for eight years, including six as mayor pro-tem
- Raymond Melvin Gateley (1926–2018), former president of the Missouri State Teacher's Association who served in the Army Air Corps during the Pacific War and as a member of the Cape Girardeau City Council for eight years
- James "J.J." Williamson (1952–2022), Cape Girardeau's first black city council member, elected in 1994

=== Key ===
Key to party colors and abbreviations for members of the U.S. Congress and other politicians or officials
Alaskan Independence (AKIP) Know Nothing (KN) American Labor (AL) Anti-Jacksonian (Anti-J); National Republican (NR) Anti-Administration (AA) Anti-Masonic (Anti-M) Conservative (Con) Covenant (Cov)	Democratic (D) Democratic–Farmer–Labor (DFL) Democratic–NPL (D-NPL) Dixiecrat (Dix), States' Rights (SR) Democratic-Republican (DR) Farmer–Labor (FL) Federalist (F); Pro-Administration (PA)	Free Soil (FS) Fusion (Fus) Greenback (GB) Independence (IPM) Jacksonian (J) Liberal (Lib) Libertarian (L) National Union (NU)	Nonpartisan League (NPL) Nullifier (N) Opposition Northern (O); Opposition Southern (O) Populist (Pop) Progressive (Prog) Prohibition (Proh) Readjuster (Rea)	Republican (R) Silver (Sv) Silver Republican (SvR) Socialist (Soc) Union (U) Unconditional Union (UU) Vermont Progressive (VP) Whig (W)	Independent (I) Nonpartisan (NP)
