= Mary McClure =

South Dakota politician

- Born: April 1, 1939; Milbank, South Dakota, United States
- Died: July 2, 2016 (aged 77); Spicer, Minnesota, United States
- Education: University of South Dakota (B.A); University of Manchester, England; Syracuse University (M.P.A.)
- Occupation: politician
- Years active: 1974–1989
- Known for: member of the South Dakota Senate
- Notable work: chaired NCSL education committee (1986), government operations committee (1987)
- Political party: Republican

Mary A. McClure Bibby (April 1, 1939 – July 2, 2016) was an American politician. She served as a member of the South Dakota Senate for Redfield, South Dakota from 1974 to 1989, and as Special Assistant to the President for Intergovernmental Affairs under President George H. W. Bush.

== Biography ==
Mary McClure was born in Milbank, South Dakota on April 21, 1939. She received a Bachelor of Arts from the University of South Dakota, a Fulbright Scholarship to study at the University of Manchester in England, and a Master's of Public Administration in 1980 from Syracuse University.

She started her career as a teacher. In 1974, she was elected to the South Dakota Senate, as a Republican, where she served until 1989. She served as president pro tempore of the senate in 1979. She also served as national chairperson of the Council of State Governments. She sat on the Board of the Legislative Research Council and on the executive committee of the National Conference of State Legislatures from 1982 to 1985 and again in 1988. She also chaired the NCSL education committee in 1986 and the NCSL government operations committee in 1987. In 1989, she resigned to become President George H. W. Bush's Special Assistant to the President for Intergovernmental Affairs. She died at the age of 77 on July 2, 2016, in Spicer, Minnesota from cancer (small cell carcinoma).
