= 1972 Indiana gubernatorial election =

- November 7, 1972
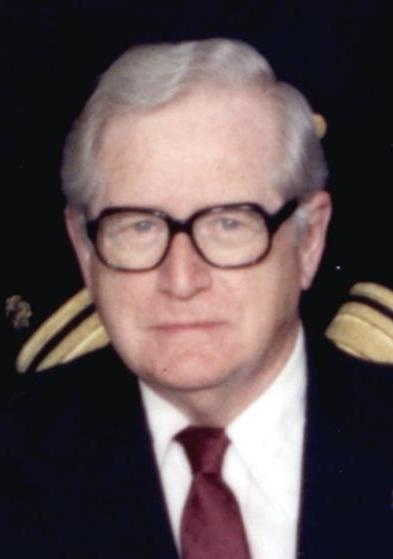

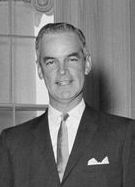
Nominee	Otis Bowen	Matthew E. Welsh
Party	Republican	Democratic
Popular vote	1,203,903	900,489
Percentage	56.77%	42.46%
- County results Bowen: 40–50% 50–60% 60–70% 70–80% Welsh: 40–50% 50–60%
Governor before election
Edgar Whitcomb
Republican
Elected Governor
Otis Bowen
Republican

The 1972 Indiana gubernatorial election was held on November 7, 1972.

Although during the same election cycle Indiana voters approved a constitutional amendment allowing the governor to serve in office for eight out of 12 years, incumbent Republican Governor Edgar Whitcomb was term-limited due to having been elected under the prior version of the constitution.

Republican nominee, Speaker of the Indiana House of Representatives Otis Bowen defeated Democratic nominee former Governor (1961–1965) Matthew E. Welsh with 56.77% of the vote.

== Nominations ==
Until 1976, all nominations for statewide office in Indiana were made by state conventions.

=== Democratic nomination ===
==== Results ====
Matthew E. Welsh, former governor def. Larry A. Conrad, secretary of state

=== Republican nomination ===
==== Results ====
Republican nomination results
Party	Candidate	Votes	%
Republican	Otis Bowen	1,243	59.70
Republican	William Sharp	364	17.48
Republican	Phil Gutman	354	17.00
Republican	W.W. "Dub" Hill	108	5.19
	N/A	13	0.62
Total votes		2,082	100.00

== General election ==
=== Results ===
==== Governor ====
1972 Indiana gubernatorial election
Party	Candidate	Votes	%	±%
Republican	Otis Bowen	1,203,903	56.77%	
Democratic	Matthew E. Welsh	900,489	42.46%	
American Independent	Berryman S. Hurley	8,525	0.40%	
Peace and Freedom	Finley C. Campbell	6,278	0.30%	
Socialist Labor	John M. Morris	1,652	0.08%	
Majority		303,414	14.31%	
Turnout		2,120,847	100.00%	
Republican hold		Swing		

==== Lieutenant governor ====
1972 Indiana lieutenant gubernatorial election
Party	Candidate	Votes	%	±%
Republican	Robert D. Orr	1,149,255	55.34%	
Democratic	Richard C. Bodine	914,000	44.01%	
American Independent	Raymond Lee Clark	6,816	0.33%	
Peace and Freedom	Elizabeth Toohy	4,737	0.23%	
Socialist Labor	Casimer Kanczuzewski	1,878	0.09%	
Majority		235,255	11.33%	
Turnout		2,076,686	100.00%	
Republican hold		Swing		

== Bibliography ==
- Gubernatorial Elections, 1787–1997. Washington, D.C.: Congressional Quarterly Inc. 1998. ISBN 1-56802-396-0.
- Scammon, Richard M., ed. (1973). America Votes 10: a handbook of contemporary American election statistics, 1972. Washington, D.C.: Governmental Affairs Institute.
- Brown, Otis R.; Du Bois, William (2000). Doc: Memories from a Life in Public Service. Bloomington, Illinois: Indiana University Press. ISBN 0-253-33767-4.
