= Henry Wolcott Toll =

Henry Wolcott Toll Sr. (November 1887 - October 1975) was an American lawyer, educator, and state senator in Colorado. He founded the American Legislators' Association, forerunner of the Council of State Governments, in 1933. The organization has had Henry Toll Fellows. His organizing efforts included sending letters in 1925 to all 7,500 state legislators in the 48 states.

He served in the Colorado Senate from 1922 until 1930. He was photographed at the opening of the Council of State Governments assembly with its president Roy Cochran, Governor of Nebraska, and executive director Frank Bane January 18, 1939. He was the group's honorary president at the time.

He attended Harvard, was a veteran of World War I, and became a lawyer. He served as CSG's director until 1938. He sought to advance cooperation and coordination among state legislators from different states. He opposed the Ku Klux Klan and their 1925 legislative agenda in Colorado. He taught at the University of Chicago and served on the National Commission on Uniform State Laws, Denver Welfare Board, and DPL Foundation. He and his wife were involved in founding Graland Country Day School in 1927. He later spoke about the organizing of the school. He was interviewed in 1963.

Dolores River publication by Henry Wolcott Toll III (readable pdf)

He married Cyrena M. Toll. They were involved in an eminent domain lawsuit regarding plans for a creek that ran through their property. They had a son Henry "Hank" W. Toll Jr. who also became a lawyer as well as a doctor. He died in 2008.

== Family members ==
- Charles Hanson Toll, Attorney General of Colorado
- Edward Wolcott, U.S. senator from Colorado
