= Council of State Governments =

Nonpartisan, non-profit organization in the United States

The Council of State Governments
- Abbreviation: CSG
- Formation: 1933
- Founder: Henry Wolcott Toll
- Type: Non-governmental organization
- Location: Lexington, KY
- Executive Director/CEO: David Adkins
- Website: www.csg.org

The Council of State Governments (CSG) is a nonpartisan, non-profit organization in the United States that serves all three branches of state government. Founded in 1933 by Colorado state senator Henry W. Toll, CSG is a region-based forum that fosters the exchange of insights and ideas to help state officials shape public policy. The CSG National Headquarters is located in Lexington, Kentucky. The council also operates regional offices in Atlanta, Chicago, New York City and Sacramento, California. CSG maintains an office in Washington, D.C. that monitors federal government activities and their impact on state issues and programs. Other CSG services include policy academies, research briefs, webinars and annual conferences and meetings at the national and regional levels.

The CSG is considered part of the 'Big Seven', a group of organizations that represent local and state government in the United States. The CSG Justice Center, which is based in New York City and has offices across the country, provides strategies to increase public safety and strengthen communities. CSG national leadership includes a governor, who serves as the national president, and a member of a state legislature, who serves as national chair. CSG regions are chaired by state legislators. CSG membership includes 56 U.S. states and territories; six Canadian provinces also partner with the council. Annual dues are paid by each state and territory to support the council's operations. In addition, revenue is derived from publication sales, registration fees, corporate grants and contributions, and investment income.

== History ==
In 1925, Henry Wolcott Toll, then a Colorado state senator, created the American Legislators’ Association, the forerunner to CSG, which provided legislators with information and opportunities to connect. Toll believed interstate cooperation was imperative for states to maintain control over inherent state issues.

CSG—the only national organization that serves all three branches of state government—was created in 1933. "Probably 12 or 15 of us sat around a table in a small room," Toll recalled 25 years later. "The Council of State Governments had never been heard of before that day."

About five years after CSG was conceived, a new building at 1313 East 60th St., in Chicago became the council's central home. In 1967, CSG and the Commonwealth of Kentucky entered into an agreement that provided CSG with a headquarters building in Lexington, Kentucky. The building was dedicated on June 9, 1969. In 1993, the state financed the construction of a second building to facilitate the council's continued growth.

Some CSG services have been offered since the early years. The Book of the States, which provides comprehensive data and analysis about state governments and their operations, was first published in 1935. State Government News, which later became the CSG bimonthly magazine, Capitol Ideas, was first published in 1958.

The Eastern Regional Conference was established in 1937. CSG opened a Washington, D.C. office in 1938. The Midwestern Legislative Conference was established in 1945. Both the Southern Conference—now the Southern Legislative Conference—and the Western Regional Conference—now CSG West—were established in 1947. In 2006, the CSG Justice Center was formed.

The CSG Henry Toll Fellowship program, a leadership development program for state officials, was established in 1986.

=== Timeline ===
- 1925 – The American Legislators' Association was established in Denver, CO
- 1930 – The headquarters of the American Legislators' Association moved to Chicago, IL
- 1935 – The Council of State Governments (CSG) was established
- 1937 – The Eastern Regional Conference (ERC) was established as the eastern regional office of CSG
- 1938 – CSG opened a Washington D.C. office
- 1945 – The Midwestern Legislative Conference (now a part of CSG Midwest) is established as the midwestern regional office of CSG
- 1947 – The Southern Conference (now the Southern Legislative Conference) and the Western Regional Conference (now known as CSG West) are established to support CSG's work in the southern and western regions
- 1969 – The CSG headquarters were moved to Lexington, KY
- 1986 – The CSG Henry Toll Fellowship, a leadership development program for state officials was established
- 2006 – The CSG Justice Center was formed out of the ERC justice program
- 2015 – CSG rededicates its national headquarters after a $5.5 million renovation to the original headquarters building
- 2016 – CSG changes address to 1776 Avenue of the States

== Regional offices ==
CSG has 6 offices across the country including 4 regional offices, a federal affairs office in Washington D.C., and the headquarters office in Lexington, KY.

| Region | Headquarters | U.S. States | U.S. Territories | Associate Members | Website |
|---|---|---|---|---|---|
| CSG West | Sacramento | Alaska, Arizona, California, Colorado, Hawaii, Idaho, Montana, Nevada, New Mexico, Oregon, Utah, Washington, Wyoming | American Samoa, Guam, Commonwealth of the Northern Mariana Islands | Alberta, British Columbia | CSG West |
| CSG Midwest | Chicago | Illinois, Indiana, Iowa, Kansas, Michigan, Minnesota, Nebraska, North Dakota, Ohio, South Dakota, Wisconsin | | Alberta, Saskatchewan, Manitoba, Ontario | CSG Midwest |
| CSG South (also known as Southern Legislative Conference) | Atlanta | Alabama, Arkansas, Florida, Georgia, Kentucky, Louisiana, Mississippi, Missouri, North Carolina, Oklahoma, South Carolina, Tennessee, Texas, Virginia, West Virginia | | | CSG SLC |
| CSG East (also known as Eastern Regional Conference) | New York City | Connecticut, Delaware, Maine, Maryland, Massachusetts, New Hampshire, New Jersey, New York, Pennsylvania, Rhode Island, Vermont | Puerto Rico, United States Virgin Islands, Washington, D.C. | New Brunswick, Newfoundland and Labrador, Nova Scotia, Ontario, Prince Edward Island, Quebec | CSG ERC |

== Justice Center ==

On December 3, 2006, The Council of State Governments' Governing Board voted to transform the Eastern Regional Conference's (CSG/ERC) criminal justice program into a national Justice Center. The Justice Center's Board of Directors includes state legislative leaders, judges, corrections administrators, juvenile justice agency directors, and law enforcement professionals, who together represent a cross-section of the senior-level state officials who shape criminal justice policy across the country. The Justice Center is headquartered in New York City with additional offices in Austin, Seattle, Bethesda, and Washington, D.C.

== Affiliate organizations ==
Affiliate organizations contribute specialized expertise, information, resources and issues to the overall mission of CSG. In turn, CSG offers a mechanism by which affiliates may tap into CSG's products and services, and a forum for bringing issues to a broader, collective state audience.

== Publications ==
- Capitol Ideas (bimonthly magazine)
- The Current State (weekly e-newsletter)
- The Book of the States (published annually since 1935, provides data and analyses about state governments and their operations)
- Shared State Legislation or SSL (annual volume that compiles legislation on topics of current importance to states)

== Presidents and Chairs ==
| Year | President | State | Chair | State |
| 1938 | Gov. Roy Cochran | Nebraska | Sen. Thomas Vernor Smith | Illinois |
| 1939 | Gov. Roy Cochran | Nebraska | Assemblyman Harold C. Ostertag | New York |
| 1940 | Gov. Lloyd C. Stark | Missouri | Rep. Ellwood J. Turner | Pennsylvania |
| 1941 | Gov. Harold E. Stassen | Minnesota | Sen. Edgar Brown | South Carolina |
| 1942 | Gov. Harold E. Stassen | Minnesota | Sen. Robert C. Hendrickson | New Jersey |
| 1943 | Gov. Herbert R. O'Conor | Maryland | Sen. Thurman A. Biddinger | Indiana |
| 1944 | Gov. Leverett Saltonstall | Massachusetts | Sen. Grant Macfarlane | Utah |
| 1945 | Gov. Herbert B. Maw | Utah | Sen. C. Petrus Peterson | Nebraska |
| 1946 | Gov. Edward Martin | Pennsylvania | Rep. S. Denmead Kolb | Maryland |
| 1947 | Gov. Millard F. Caldwell | Florida | Sen. John W. Van Ness | Indiana |
| 1948 | Gov. Horace Hildreth | Maine | Sen. Charles H. Jenkins | North Carolina |
| 1949 | Gov. William Preston Lane Jr. | Maryland | Sen. Burton M. Cross | Maine |
| 1950 | Gov. Frank Carlson | Kansas | Sen. John W. Noble | Missouri |
| 1951 | Gov. Frank J. Lausche | Ohio | Rep. Bernice T. Van der Vries (Note: First female Chair) | Illinois |
| 1952 | Gov. Val Peterson | Nebraska | Rep. J. Maynard Magruder | Virginia |
| 1953 | Gov. Allan Shivers | Texas | Rep. Elisha T. Barrett | New York |
| 1954 | Gov. Dan Thornton | Colorado | Sen. Stanton Hall | Mississippi |
| 1955 | Gov. Robert F. Kennon | Louisiana | Sen. Carleton G. Howe | Vermont |
| 1956 | Gov. Arthur B. Langlie | Washington | Sen. Robert A. Ainsworth Jr. | Louisiana |
| 1957 | Gov. Thomas B. Stanley | Virginia | Sen. Frank E. Panzer | Wisconsin |
| 1958 | Gov. William G. Stratton | Illinois | Sen. John W. Noble | Missouri |
| 1959 | Gov. LeRoy Collins | Florida | Sen. Elisha T. Barrett | New York |
| 1960 | Gov. J. Caleb Boggs | Delaware | Sen. James J. McBride | California |
| 1961 | Gov. Stephen L.R. McNichols | Colorado | Sen. Hal Bridenbaugh | Nebraska |
| 1962 | Gov. Wesley Powell | New Hampshire | Speaker J. D. McCarty | Oklahoma |
| 1963 | Gov. Albert D. Rosellini | Washington | Sen. David Davis | Illinois |
| 1964 | Gov. John Anderson Jr. | Kansas | Sen. Clarence L. Carpenter | Arizona |
| 1965 | Gov. Grant Sawyer | Nevada | Sen. C. George DeStefano | Rhode Island |
| 1966 | Gov. John H. Reed | Maine | Sen. Albert M. Spradling Jr. | Missouri |
| 1967 | Gov. William L. Guy | North Dakota | Sen. Charles Welch Jr. | Utah |
| 1968 | Gov. John A. Volpe | Massachusetts | Sen. Edward L. Marcus | Connecticut |
| 1969 | Gov. Buford Ellington | Tennessee | Sen. Edwin C. Becker | North Dakota |
| 1970 | Gov. John A. Love | Colorado | Sen. Charles L. Delaney | Vermont |
| 1971 | Gov. Warren E. Hearnes | Missouri | Sen. Charles L. Delaney | Vermont |
| 1972 | Gov. Arch A. Moore Jr. | West Virginia | Speaker Ray S. Smith, Jr. | Arkansas |
| 1973 | Gov. Marvin Mandel | Maryland | Assemblyman Charles J. Conrad | California |
| 1974 | Gov. Daniel J. Evans | Washington | Speaker William J. Lanting | Idaho |
| 1975 | Gov. Cal Rampton | Utah | Sen. John J. Marchi | New York |
| 1976 | Gov. Robert D. Ray | Iowa | Sen. J. Harry Michael Jr. | Virginia |
| 1977 | Gov. Reubin O'Donovan Askew | Florida | Speaker Pro Tem John J. Thomas | Indiana |
| 1978 | Gov. William G. Milliken | Michigan | Speaker Bill Clayton | Texas |
| 1979 | Gov. Julian M. Carroll | Kentucky | Speaker James Kennelly | Connecticut |
| 1980 | Gov. Otis R. Bowen, M.D. | Indiana | Senate Pres. Oliver Ocasek | Ohio |
| 1981 | Gov. George Busbee | Georgia | Rep. William Grannell | Oregon |
| 1982 | Gov. Richard A. Snelling | Vermont | Sen. Kenneth C. Royall Jr. | North Carolina |
| 1983 | Gov. Scott M. Matheson | Utah | Rep. Timothy Moynihan | Connecticut |
| 1984 | Gov. James R. Thompson | Illinois | Rep. Roy Hausauer | North Dakota |
| 1985 | Gov. Charles S. Robb | Virginia | Sen. James I. Gibson | Nevada |
| 1986 | Gov. Robert D. Orr | Indiana | Rep. John E. Miller | Arkansas |
| 1987 | Gov. Richard H. Bryan | Nevada | Sen. Hugh Farley | New York |
| 1988 | Gov. James Martin | North Carolina | Senate President Pro Tem Mary McClure | South Dakota |
| 1989 | Gov. William A. O'Neill | Connecticut | Senate President Arnold Christensen | Utah |
| 1990 | Gov. Michael N. Castle | Delaware | Speaker Thomas B. Murphy | Georgia |
| 1991 | Gov. Terry Branstad | Iowa | Sen. W. Paul White | Massachusetts |
| 1992 | Gov. Zell Miller | Georgia | Rep. John Connors | Iowa |
| 1993 | Gov. Jim Edgar | Illinois | Sen. Jeannette Hamby | Oregon |
| 1994 | Gov. Ben Nelson | Nebraska | Rep. Bob Hunter | North Carolina |
| 1995 | Gov. Mel Carnahan | Missouri | Assemblyman Bob Wertz | New York |
| 1996 | Gov. Mike Leavitt | Utah | Senate President Stan Aronoff | Ohio |
| 1997 | Gov. George Pataki | New York | Sen. Jeff Wells | Colorado |
| 1998 | Gov. Pedro Rosselló (Note: First Hispanic President) | Puerto Rico | Rep. Charlie Williams | Mississippi |
| 1999 | Gov. Tommy Thompson | Wisconsin | Sen. Kenneth McClintock (Note: First Hispanic Chair) | Puerto Rico |
| 2000 | Gov. Paul E. Patton | Kentucky | Rep. Tom Ryder | Illinois |
| 2001 | Gov. Dirk Kempthorne | Idaho | Sen. Manny Aragón (Note: Second Hispanic chair) | New Mexico |
| 2002 | Gov. Parris Glendening | Maryland | Sen. John Chichester | Virginia |
| 2003 | Gov. Mike Huckabee | Arkansas | Rep. Dan Bosley | Massachusetts |
| 2004 | Gov. Frank Murkowski | Alaska | Sen. John Hottinger | Minnesota |
| 2005 | Gov. Ruth Ann Minner (Note: First female President) | Delaware | Assemblyman Lynn Hettrick | Nevada |
| 2006 | Gov. Jim Douglas | Vermont | Senate President Earl Ray Tomblin | West Virginia |
| 2007 | Gov. Brad Henry | Oklahoma | Rep. Deborah Hudson | Delaware |
| 2008 | Gov. M. Jodi Rell | Connecticut | Rep. Kim Koppelman | North Dakota |
| 2009 | Gov. Joe Manchin III | West Virginia | Senator Bart Davis | Idaho |
| 2010 | Gov. Mike Rounds | South Dakota | Senate President David Williams | Kentucky |
| 2011 | Gov. Brian Schweitzer | Montana | Rep. Robert (Bob) Godfrey | Connecticut |
| 2012 | Gov. Luis Fortuño | Puerto Rico | Sen. Jay Emler | Kansas |
| 2013 | Gov. Jay Nixon | Missouri | Sen. Gary Stevens | Alaska |
| 2014 | Gov. Earl Ray Tomblin | West Virginia | Sen. Mark Norris | Tennessee |
| 2015 | Gov. Brian Sandoval | Nevada | Sen. Carl Marcellino | New York |
| 2016 | Gov. Jack Markell | Delaware | Sen. Beau McCoy | Nebraska |
| 2017 | Gov. Kate Brown | Oregon | Sen. Kelvin Atkinson | Nevada |
| 2018 | Gov. Gary Herbert | Utah | Senate President Robert Stivers | Kentucky |
| 2019 | Gov. Ricardo Rosselló | Puerto Rico | Sen. Lou D'Allesandro | New Hampshire |
| 2020 | Gov. Laura Kelly | Kansas | Rep. Joan Ballweg | Wisconsin |
| 2021 | Gov. Laura Kelly | Kansas | Rep. Joan Ballweg | Wisconsin |
| 2022 | Gov. David Ige | Hawaii | Sen. Sam Hunt | Washington |
| 2023 | Gov. John Carney | Delaware | Rep. Julia Howard | North Carolina |

== See also ==
- National Association of Counties
- National Center for State Courts
- National Conference of State Legislatures
- National League of Cities
