= 1988 Indiana gubernatorial election =

- November 8, 1988
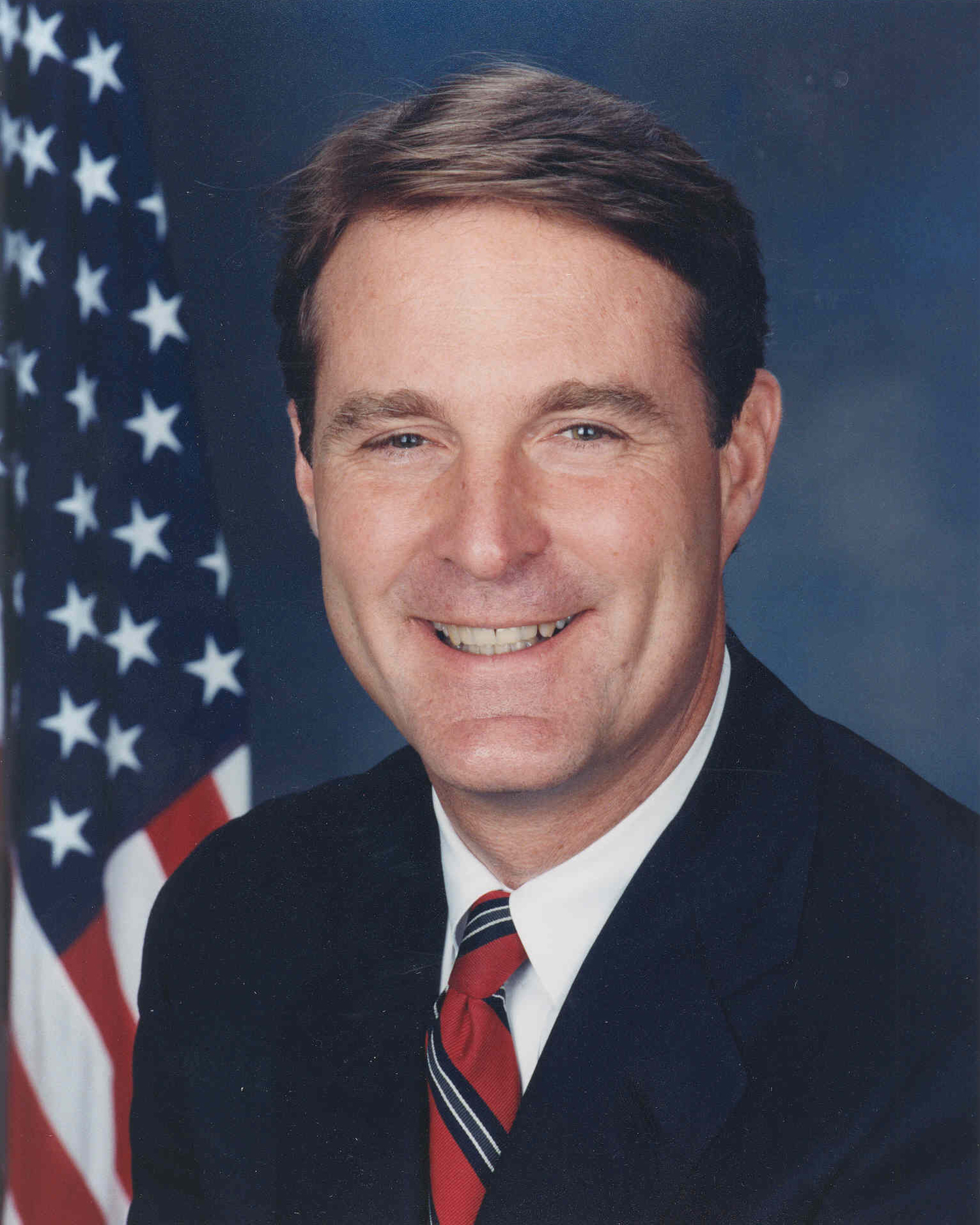

Nominee	Evan Bayh	John Mutz
Party	Democratic	Republican
Running mate	Frank O'Bannon	Stephen Goldsmith
Popular vote	1,138,574	1,000,207
Percentage	53.18%	46.82%
- County results Bayh: 50–60% 60–70% 70–80% Mutz: 50–60% 60–70% 70–80%
Governor before election
Robert D. Orr
Republican
Elected Governor
Evan Bayh
Democratic

The 1988 Indiana gubernatorial election was held on November 8, 1988, in all 92 counties in the state of Indiana. Incumbent Governor Robert D. Orr, a Republican, was ineligible to run for a third consecutive term due to term limits established by the Indiana Constitution. In the general election, the Republican nominee, Lieutenant Governor John Mutz, was defeated by Democrat Indiana Secretary of State Evan Bayh by a margin of six percentage points. Bayh was the first Democrat to be elected Governor of Indiana since Roger D. Branigin's victory during the 1964 Democratic landslides twenty-four years previously.

== Primaries ==
=== Republican Party ===
- John Mutz, incumbent Lieutenant Governor of Indiana

While the Republicans controlled the governor's mansion going into the 1988 elections, they were unable to nominate the incumbent governor, Robert D. Orr, due to term limits set in place by the Indiana Constitution. With Orr out of the running, the obvious choice to succeed him was his lieutenant governor, John Mutz. Mutz did not face a challenger for the nomination, and consequently rolled up 393,595 votes in the 1988 Republican primary election, a total that was nevertheless a little less than 100,000 votes fewer than his Democratic opponent, Secretary of State Evan Bayh, received in a three-way race for the Democratic nomination.

Indiana Republican primary election, 1988
Party	Candidate	Votes	%
Republican	John Mutz	393,595	100.00

=== Democratic primary ===
- Evan Bayh, Secretary of State of Indiana
- Steve Daily, Mayor of Kokomo
- Frank O'Bannon, State Senator (withdrew)

While the Republican primary was a specific coronation of Mutz, the contest for the Democratic nomination was the complete opposite. Three candidates initially contested the nomination: Evan Bayh, the incumbent Secretary of State of Indiana and son of former U.S. Senator Birch Bayh; Steve Daily, then-mayor of Kokomo; and Frank O'Bannon, a member of the Indiana State Senate. From the outset, Bayh was seen as the front runner in the race, and O'Bannon would eventually bow out to accept Bayh's offer to run for Lieutenant Governor, leaving Daily as the only challenger to the young politician who was being called "Indiana's Democratic boy wonder".

Hoping to prevent the nomination of a candidate who might upend their dominance in Hoosier politics, state Republicans led by Governor Orr filed a legal challenge to Bayh's candidacy, claiming that he did not meet the residency requirements for candidates for the state's highest office and demanding that he be removed from the ballot. The attempt backfired: rather than neutralizing Bayh, the legal challenge actually boosted his standing in the race. On April 28, the Indiana Supreme Court found that Bayh did, in fact, meet all residency requirements set forth in the state's Constitution, ending any threat to the candidate's ballot access. Simultaneously, the challenge allowed Bayh to cast himself as the underdog and a target of the Republican political machine, calling the challenge a "rather sad commentary" on Republican confidence in Mutz.

Bayh won the Democratic nomination with 493,198 votes, or 83.1%

Indiana Democratic primary election, 1988
Party	Candidate	Votes	%
Democratic	Evan Bayh	493,198	83.1
Democratic	Steve Daily	66,242	11.1
Democratic	Frank O'Bannon	34,360	5.8

== General election ==
Throughout the fall campaign, Mutz attempted to capitalize on Bayh's youth by casting him as inexperienced and unfit to lead Indiana from the governor's mansion. Accusing Bayh of being more interested in a potential Senate run than in being governor, Mutz drew a distinction between his own extensive record in state government and Bayh's relatively recent arrival on the political stage. Comparing Bayh to an unqualified job applicant, Mutz wondered aloud if Hoosiers would "employ someone who has lived in this state only a handful of years, by anybody`s measure, and who has only a year's experience in that system?" Bayh returned fire by attacking Mutz as the candidate of the political machine. Despite the attacks, the two candidate's platforms showed remarkable similarity. Both Bayh and Mutz were committed to education reform, and both pledged to make government more efficient and to promote economic growth. Speaking to the New York Times, Bayh's campaign manager acknowledged that the Democrat was running on a relatively conservative platform. "I'd like to say that Hoosiers are an independent lot", he said.

On election night, Bayh defeated Mutz by a comfortable margin, winning 53% of the vote to Mutz's 47%. Bayh's victory was remarkable for a number of reasons. First, a Democrat had not been elected governor of Indiana since 1964, a year that had seen a landslide for Democrats up and down the ballot. Second, he was the youngest governor in the nation at the time of his election, his 33rd birthday taking place nearly two months after election day. Third, Indiana was carried by the Republican ticket (which featured Indiana Senator Dan Quayle as the vice presidential nominee) in the 1988 Presidential Election, and elections for the Indiana General Assembly resulted in a chamber that was evenly split between Democrats and Republicans.

Bayh's victory in what was otherwise a good year for Indiana Republicans stood testament to his bipartisan appeal, which would allow him to be re-elected governor in 1992 and then to serve two terms in the U.S. Senate.

== Results ==
Indiana gubernatorial election, 1988
Party	Candidate	Votes	%
Democratic	Evan Bayh	1,138,574	53.18
Republican	John Mutz	1,002,207	46.82
Total votes		2,140,781	100.00
Democratic gain from Republican			
