= 1976 Indiana gubernatorial election =

- November 2, 1976
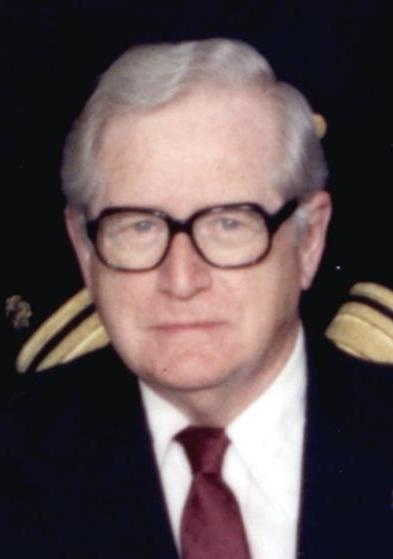

Nominee	Otis Bowen	Larry A. Conrad
Party	Republican	Democratic
Popular vote	1,236,555	927,243
Percentage	56.85%	42.63%
- County results Bowen: 40–50% 50–60% 60–70% 70–80% Conrad: 40–50% 50–60%
Governor before election
Otis Bowen
Republican
Elected Governor
Otis Bowen
Republican

The 1976 Indiana gubernatorial election was held on November 2, 1976. Incumbent Republican Governor Otis Bowen defeated Democratic nominee Larry A. Conrad with 56.85% of the vote.

== Primary elections ==
Primary elections were held on May 4, 1976.

=== Democratic primary ===
==== Candidates ====
- Larry A. Conrad, Secretary of State
- Jack L. New, State Treasurer
- Robert J. Fair, State Senator

==== Results ====
Democratic primary results
Party	Candidate	Votes	%
Democratic	Larry A. Conrad	358,421	64.47
Democratic	Jack L. New	105,965	19.06
Democratic	Robert J. Fair	91,606	16.48
Total votes		555,992	100.00

=== Republican primary ===
==== Candidates ====
- Otis Bowen, incumbent Governor

==== Results ====
Republican primary results
Party	Candidate	Votes	%
Republican	Otis Bowen (incumbent)	unopposed	
Total votes			

== General election ==
=== Candidates ===
- Larry Conrad, Democratic
- Otis Bowen, Republican
- Daniel P. Talbot, American, pastor of the Church of God, Plymouth
- Samuel L. Washington, U.S. Labor

=== Results ===
1976 Indiana gubernatorial election
Party	Candidate	Votes	%	±%
Republican	Otis Bowen (incumbent)	1,236,555	56.85%	
Democratic	Larry A. Conrad	927,243	42.63%	
American	Daniel P. Talbot	9,850	0.45%	
U.S. Labor	Samuel L. Washington	1,676	0.08%	
Majority		309,312	14.22%	
Turnout		2,175,324	100.00%	
Republican hold		Swing		

== Bibliography ==
- Gubernatorial Elections, 1787-1997. Washington, D.C.: Congressional Quarterly Inc. 1998. ISBN 1-56802-396-0.
- Scammon, Richard M.; McGillivray, Alice V. (1977). America Votes 12: a handbook of contemporary American election statistics, 1976. Washington, D.C.: Elections Research Center.
