= John Mutz =

American politician and business leader (born 1935)

- Mutz at Purdue University in 1987

45th Lieutenant Governor of Indiana
- In office January 12, 1981 – January 9, 1989
- Governor: Robert D. Orr
- Preceded by: Robert D. Orr
- Succeeded by: Frank O'Bannon

26th Chair of the National Lieutenant Governors Association
- In office 1985–1986
- Preceded by: Zell Miller
- Succeeded by: Winston Bryant

Member of the Indiana Senate from the 31st district
- In office November 8, 1972 – November 19, 1980
- Preceded by: Wilfrid John Ullrich
- Succeeded by: Dan Burton

Member of the Indiana Senate from the 19th district
- In office November 3, 1971 – November 8, 1972
- Preceded by: Willie Warren Hill Jr.
- Succeeded by: Willard Wayne Townsend

Member of the Indiana House of Representatives from the 26th district
- In office November 9, 1966 – November 4, 1970
- Preceded by: Multi-member district
- Succeeded by: Multi-member district

Personal details
- Born: John Massie Mutz; November 5, 1935 (age 90) Indianapolis, Indiana, U.S.
- Party: Republican
- Spouse: Carolyn Jane Hawthorne
- Children: 2
- Education: Northwestern University (BS, MS)

John Massie Mutz (born November 5, 1935) is an American business leader and politician who served as Lieutenant Governor of Indiana, Republican candidate for Governor and president of Lilly Endowment, one of America's largest family foundations.

Born in Indianapolis, Mutz is a graduate of Northwestern University, earning both a bachelor's degree and master's degrees in advertising and business management there.

Mutz has had a long business career including the management of a large group of Burger Chef restaurants and serving as president of PSI Energy, Indiana's largest utility.

In Indiana politics, he served as State Representative from 1967 to 1970, State Senator from 1971 to 1980 and as the 45th Lieutenant Governor, serving under Robert D. Orr from 1980 to 1988. He ran for Indiana State Treasurer in 1970, but lost the general election. Mutz was defeated by Evan Bayh in the 1988 race for Indiana Governor.

Political offices
Preceded by Robert D. Orr	Lieutenant Governor of Indiana; 1981–1989	Succeeded by Frank O'Bannon
Party political offices
Preceded by John Snyder	Republican nominee for Treasurer of Indiana; 1970	Succeeded by Randall C. Miller
Preceded by Robert D. Orr	Republican nominee for Lieutenant Governor of Indiana; 1980, 1984	Succeeded by Stephen Goldsmith
Preceded by Robert D. Orr	Republican nominee for Governor of Indiana; 1988	Succeeded by Linley E. Pearson
