= Daryl Arnold =

American farmer, businessman and diplomat (1924-1997)

United States Ambassador to Singapore
- In office April 28, 1987 – July 8, 1989
- President: Ronald Reagan; George H. W. Bush
- Preceded by: J. Stapleton Roy
- Succeeded by: Robert D. Orr

Personal details
- Born: November 12, 1924 Santa Monica, California, U.S.
- Died: December 30, 1997 (aged 73) Moreno Valley, California, U.S.
- Party: Republican
- Spouse: Shirley Haymore Arnold
- Children: 3
- Education: University of Southern California; Midshipman School
- Occupation: Farmer; Diplomat

Daryl Arnold (November 12, 1924 – December 30, 1997) was a farmer, businessman and diplomat. He served as the 8th United States Ambassador to Singapore from 1987 to 1989.

== Career ==
Arnold served as president of the Western Growers Association, one of the largest agricultural trade associations in the United States, for 16 years.

In 1987, Arnold was appointed ambassador to Singapore by President Ronald Reagan. He served as an ambassador till 1989 and became Singapore’s honorary consul general in California.

== Personal life ==
Arnold and his wife Shirley were driving to Palm Springs, California to celebrate her 73rd birthday. On the way, their Cadillac veered off the highway and crashed into a signpost killing them both. Arnold and his wife had been married for 51 years and lived in Corona del Mar, California.

Diplomatic posts
Preceded by J. Stapleton Roy	United States Ambassador to Singapore; 1987–1989	Succeeded by Robert D. Orr
