= Not Just Another Cable News Show =

- Country of origin: United States

Production
- Camera setup: Multi-camera
- Running time: 30 minutes

Original release
- Network: HLN: Headline News (2008); HLN (2008-2009)
- Release: April 5, 2008 – March 2009

Related
- News to Me

Not Just Another Cable News Show is a comedy cable news show on CNN: Headline News that premiered on April 5, 2008. It was canceled in March, 2009 and replaced with Issues with Jane Velez-Mitchell. It featured comedians' perspectives on historic events. It formerly aired at 7 pm, 9 pm, midnight, and 5 am on Saturday and Sunday.
