= Otis Bowen =

American politician (1918–2013)

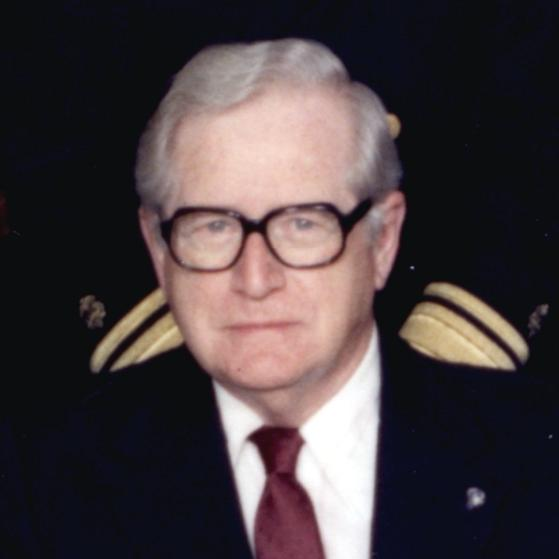

16th United States Secretary of Health and Human Services
- In office December 13, 1985 – January 20, 1989
- President: Ronald Reagan
- Preceded by: Margaret Heckler
- Succeeded by: Louis W. Sullivan

Chair of the National Governors Association
- In office July 10, 1979 – August 5, 1980
- Preceded by: Julian Carroll
- Succeeded by: George Busbee

44th Governor of Indiana
- In office January 8, 1973 – January 12, 1981
- Lieutenant: Robert Orr
- Preceded by: Edgar Whitcomb
- Succeeded by: Robert Orr

Speaker of the Indiana House of Representatives
- In office November 9, 1966 – November 8, 1972
- Preceded by: Richard Clay Bodine
- Succeeded by: Kermit Owen Burrous

Member of the Indiana House of Representatives
- In office November 9, 1960 – November 8, 1972
- Preceded by: Forest Nelson McLaughlin
- Succeeded by: James Lowell Drews
- Constituency: 8th district
- In office November 7, 1956 – November 5, 1958
- Preceded by: Raymonde Alexis Clarke
- Succeeded by: Forest Nelson McLaughlin
- Constituency: Marshall County

Personal details
- Born: Otis Ray Bowen; February 26, 1918 Fulton County, Indiana, US
- Died: May 4, 2013 (aged 95) Donaldson, Indiana, US
- Party: Republican
- Spouses: Elizabeth Steinmann (m. 1939; died 1981) Rose Hochstetler (m. 1981; died 1991) Carol Hahn (m. 1993)
- Children: 4
- Education: Indiana University, Bloomington (BA); Indiana University, Indianapolis (MD)

Military service
- Allegiance: United States
- Branch/service: United States Army
- Years of service: 1943–1946
- Battles/wars: World War II

Otis Ray Bowen (February 26, 1918 – May 4, 2013) was an American politician and physician who served as the 44th governor of Indiana from 1973 to 1981 and as Secretary of Health and Human Services in the Cabinet of President Ronald Reagan from 1985 to 1989.

Bowen began his medical career in 1942. He served in the United States Army medical corps from 1943 to 1946 rising to the rank of captain. After World War II, he set up a medical practice in Bremen, Indiana and later became involved in Republican Party politics, serving as a member of the Indiana House of Representatives from 1956 to 1958 and 1960 to 1972, including as Speaker of the House from 1967 to 1972. Bowen was elected Governor of Indiana in 1972 and re-elected in 1976. He also taught at Indiana University until his appointment as Secretary of Health and Human Services in 1985.

At the time of his appointment, criticism was rising that the Reagan Administration was not doing enough to respond to AIDS. During his term, Bowen offered explicit warnings about the threats posed by the disease. By 1987, he warned that the threat posed by AIDS could rival deadly health disasters like the Black Death, smallpox, and typhoid if more was not done to combat the threat posed by the disease but the following year he also commented "we do not expect any explosion into the heterosexual population." Bowen served as Secretary of Health and Human Services until his retirement in 1989.

== Early life ==
Bowen was born near Rochester, Indiana, to Vernie Bowen and Pearl Irene Wright. His father's side of the family was deeply religious and originally came from Ohio. Vernie Bowen graduated from Valparaiso University and was a teacher for 43 years. Vernie Bowen also owned a hardware store in Leiters Ford, was a trustee for Aubbeenaubbee Township, president of the Woodlawn Hospital Board of Trustees, and president of the Leiters Ford Merchants Association. His father was a Scottish Rite Freemason and a member of the Independent Order of Odd Fellows. In 1915, Vernie Bowen married Pearl Irene Wright, whose family was also from Ohio and involved with the Independent Order of Odd Fellows. Otis Bowen is a distant relative of George H. W. Bush through two brothers who immigrated to New England from Somerset, England.

Bowen received his elementary and high school education from local schools and went on to graduate from Indiana University Bloomington with an A.B. in 1939 and the Indiana University School of Medicine with an M.D. in 1942. At IU, he became a member of the Delta Chi fraternity as well as the Phi Beta Pi medical fraternity. He holds 30 honorary degrees including those from schools in his home state such as Indiana University, the University of Notre Dame, Ball State University, Valparaiso University, and Anderson University. In addition to an honorary degree, Bethel College also named their campus library in his honor.

Bowen married Elizabeth Anne Steinmann in 1939, who died shortly before his term as Indiana Governor expired in 1981. They had four children; Rick, Judy, Tim, and Rob. Following Elizabeth's death, he married Rose May Hochstetler in September 1981, a marriage which lasted until Rose's death in 1991. From 1992 until his death in 2013, he was married to his third wife, Carol Hahn.

== Career ==
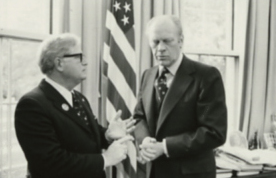
Bowen with President Gerald Ford in 1976

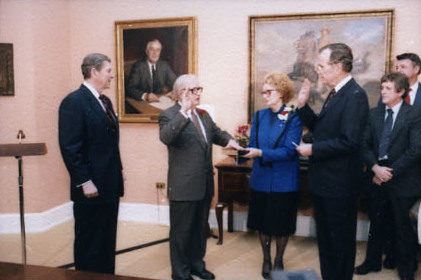
Bowen being sworn in as Secretary of Health and Human Services in 1985

Bowen began his career as an intern at Memorial Hospital in South Bend, Indiana, in 1942. From 1943 to 1946 he served in the Medical Corps of the United States Army, rising from the rank of 1st lieutenant to captain. On his return from World War II, he set up his own medical practice in his hometown of Bremen, Indiana, which he discontinued in 1972. As a physician, he was instrumental in helping establish a community hospital for Bremen in 1956. During this time, he also was a member of staff for various hospitals in Indiana and served as coroner for Marshall County, Indiana. In 1981, he took up the post of clinical professor of family medicine at Indiana University.

During his medical and teaching career, Bowen also got into Republican Party politics, serving as a member of the Indiana House of Representatives from 1956 to 1958 and again from 1960 to 1972. He was speaker of the house from 1967 to 1972, vice chairman of the legislative council from 1967 to 1968, and chairman until 1972. After his first unsuccessful attempt in the Republican primary in 1968, he was elected Governor of Indiana in 1972 and was re-elected for a second term in 1976, making him the first Governor to serve for eight consecutive years in Indiana since 1851. His campaign slogan, featured in huge letters on billboards, was "Otis Bowen. He Hears You". His tenure in Indiana's highest public office was marked by a major tax restructuring reducing reliance on property taxes, major improvements to state park facilities, development of a statewide emergency medical services system, and adoption of a medical malpractice law that was destined to become a national model. From 1978 to 1985, he also served on the board of trustees for Valparaiso University. Simultaneously, Bowen served as chairman of the Republican Governors Association, the Midwestern Governors Association, and the National Governors Association. In 1980, he served as President of the Council of State Governments.

Bowen continued teaching at Indiana University until he was appointed as Secretary of Health and Human Services by President Ronald Reagan and confirmed by the U.S. Senate on a vote of 93 to 2, making him the first medical doctor to serve in this position.

At the time of his appointment, criticism was rising that the Reagan Administration was not doing enough to respond to AIDS. Although not as prominent in his advocacy for AIDS issues as then-Surgeon General C. Everett Koop, Bowen did offer explicit warnings about the threats posed by the disease, including its risk to heterosexuals. By 1987, he warned that the threat posed by AIDS could rival deadly health disasters like the Black Death, smallpox, and typhoid if more was not done to combat the threat posed by the disease. The following year, after new studies were released showing that the spread of the disease was slowing within many population groups, he commented that "We do not expect any explosion into the heterosexual population."

It is said that as Secretary of Health and Human Services, he always had a prescription pad handy, recommending remedies to treat minor ailments for both colleagues and members of the press. He served in that position until 1989, when he retired to his home in Bremen, Indiana.

== Community involvement ==
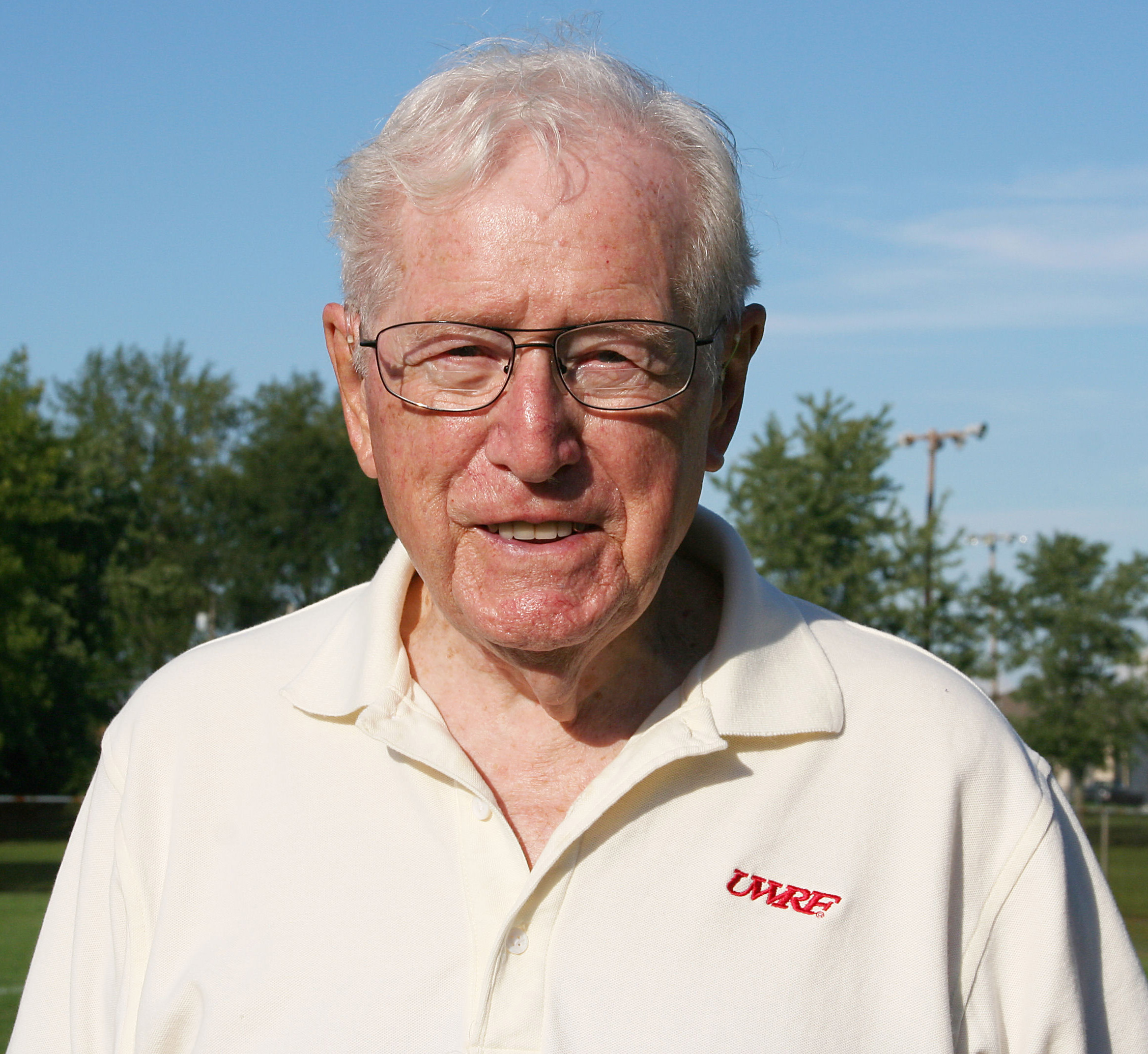
Bowen at a community event in 2007

Bowen served on a number of committees and conferences, including the Education Commission of the States, and the President's Commission on Federalism. He was the chairman of the Paperwork Commission, Nursing Study Commission, and Medicare Study Commission. He also received various awards, including the George F. Hixson award from Kiwanis International. Bowen was a Lutheran and member of the American Medical Association, the American Legion, Veterans of Foreign Wars, Alpha Omega Alpha, Phi Beta Pi, Delta Chi, and Kiwanis. Bowen was also a fellow of the National Academy of Public Administration.

The Bowen Center for Public Affairs was founded by Ball State University in honor of Bowen. He attended the Bowen Institute on Political Participation every year and provided a congratulatory address to the graduates of this two-day seminar.

The Otis R. Bowen Museum, located on the campus of Bethel University, houses memorabilia and artifacts related to Dr. Otis Bowen's years as Governor of Indiana and Secretary of Health and Human Services. It also houses a copy of the Bust of Otis Bowen while the original is located in the Indiana Statehouse.

== Death ==
Bowen died May 4, 2013, at a nursing home in Donaldson, Indiana. He was 95.

== See also ==
- List of governors of Indiana

Indiana House of Representatives
| Preceded by Raymonde Alexis Clarke | Member of the Indiana House of Representatives from Marshall County; 1956–1958 | Succeeded by Forest Nelson McLaughlin |
| Preceded by Forest Nelson McLaughlin | Member of the Indiana House of Representatives from the 8th district 1960–1972 | Succeeded by James Lowell Drews |
Party political offices
| Preceded by Edgar Whitcomb | Republican nominee for Governor of Indiana; 1972, 1976 | Succeeded by Robert Orr |
| Preceded by Robert D. Ray | Chair of the Republican Governors Association; 1978–1979 | Succeeded by Richard A. Snelling |
Political offices
| Preceded by Richard Clay Bodine | Speaker of the Indiana House of Representatives; 1966–1972 | Succeeded by Kermit Owen Burrous |
| Preceded by Edgar Whitcomb | Governor of Indiana; 1973–1981 | Succeeded by Robert Orr |
| Preceded by Julian Carroll | Chair of the National Governors Association; 1979–1980 | Succeeded by George Busbee |
| Preceded by Margaret Heckler | United States Secretary of Health and Human Services; 1985–1989 | Succeeded by Louis W. Sullivan |
