= Bust of Otis Bowen =

Sculpture by Lou Ann Lanagan

Otis Bowen
- Artist: Lou Ann Lanagan
- Year: 1981
- Type: Bronze sculpture
- Dimensions: (20.5" in × 13" in)
- Location: Indiana Statehouse, Indianapolis, Indiana, United States; 39°46′7.2″N 86°9′45.69″W
- Owner: State of Indiana

Otis Bowen is a bronze bust of Dr. Otis Bowen, who was the Governor of Indiana from 1973 to 1981 and U.S. Secretary of Health and Human Services from 1985 to 1989 under President Ronald Reagan.

== Description ==
The bronze bust depicts former Governor Otis R. Bowen in glasses and wearing a jacket, shirt and tie. The bust sits atop a wooden base to which a plaque is attached that reads "OTIS R. BOWEN, M.D. / GOVERNOR / JANUARY 8, 1973 - JANUARY 12, 1981." The bust and base sit within an alcove on the second floor of the Indiana Statehouse directly across the hall from the House of Representatives. A plaque attached to the wall under the alcove reads:

Dr. Bowen was the first / Governor to serve two / consecutive four year / terms since adoption of the / 1851 Indiana Constitution. / This bust was given to the / people of Indiana in 1983 by / the artist, Lou Ann Lanagan, / of Indianapolis, / and the committee / for a Bowen portrait.

The back of the bust is signed by both Governor Bowen and artist Lou Ann Lanagan, and is dated 1981.

== Historical information ==
In 1981, the original model of the bust was made in clay based on Polaroid photographs taken of the governor by artist Lou Ann Lanagan, a personal friend of Bowen's. Lanagan chose to portray Bowen smiling to reflect his open personality. Using the lost-wax casting process, Lanagan created the final bust in bronze.

Three copies were made of the bust: one resides in the rotunda of the Indiana Statehouse, one at the Otis R. Bowen Museum on the campus of Bethel College, and another belongs to Ball State University, where it stands in the Archives and Special Collections Research Center in Bracken Library.

== Artist ==
Sculptor Lou Ann Lanagan was not professionally trained as an artist, but became interested in sculpting after watching her dentist work with dental plaster. Lanagan commented to her dentist that the work looked like fun, so he challenged her to make the likeness of a human face out of clay. Starting with a bust of her husband, Lanagan soon moved on to produce busts of other prominent Indiana businessmen, including Eli Lilly and Thomas H. Lake (President, Eli Lilly and Co.). Lanagan has stated that she prefers to sculpt men over the age of 50.
