= Southeast Missouri Hospital =

Mercy Hospital Southeast

Geography
- Location: Cape Girardeau, Missouri, United States
- Coordinates: 37°18′39″N 89°32′24″W

Services
- Beds: 269

Helipads
- Helipad: FAA LID: MU10

History
- Opened: 1928

Links
- Website: www.sehealth.org
- Lists: Hospitals in Missouri

Southeast Hospital is a private, not-for-profit hospital located in Cape Girardeau, Missouri. Southeast Missouri Hospital first opened in 1928 and has grown into a regional medical complex serving over 600,000 people in 22 counties in Southeast Missouri and Southern Illinois. In 2007, the hospital had 269 licensed beds, 11,487 admissions and employed over 2,000 people.

== History ==
In 1924, citizens in Cape Girardeau, Missouri formed a committee to build a non-denominational, non-profit community hospital in the city. In 1926, a group of 20 businessmen and physicians signed individual promissory notes to purchase a 52.5-acre (21.2 ha) tract of land for $8,250 from Emil Thilenius and Mrs. Anna Keller. Later, a 5-acre (2.0 ha) tract known as the "Greene farm" was purchased from Hervey Little and became the site of the present hospital. After the purchase, the two story farmhouse that stood on the current site of the hospital was moved down the hill to serve as the nursing quarters.

After the purchase of the farm, the committee sectioned off some of the land into lots for a new subdivision called Sunset Terrace. The money from the sale of the lots was applied to the unpaid balance of land and the rest was placed in a fund to be used for the hospital. The lots went on sale in October 1924, and the venture proved to be very successful with 213 lots being sold within one week.

The name for Cape Girardeau's new hospital was chosen on the recommendation of the Southeast Missouri Medical Association. Since the hospital would serve the entire district, the Association said it would be appropriate to have it known as a district institution. This prediction by the Medical Association proved to be correct as 75% of the patients admitted during the first year of the hospital came from outside of the city of Cape Girardeau.

In June 1926, the Southeast Hospital Association was organized and incorporated on August 6, 1926 with 23 members signing the incorporation documents. There were 11 members of the first Board of Trustees, including the officers. The Association realized that more money would have to be raised to provide a firm financial foundation for the hospital. Led by the Hospital Campaign Committee, they turned to the public for help. Within eight weeks the hospital received about $90,000 from 386 contributors. Construction on the original 90-bed hospital began on April 12, 1927.

The hospital was dedicated on January 8, 1928 in front of 5,000 people who crowded shoulder to shoulder on "hospital hill". Thieresia M. Norberg was hired as the hospital's first administrator a few months before the dedication with the salary of $50 per week plus "maintenance". The first patient, Guy Lowes from Cape Girardeau County, was admitted to the hospital on January 9, 1928 for a tonsillectomy. The first baby was born in the new hospital on January 17, 1928 to Mr. and Mrs. Oscar Hahs of Cape Girardeau. The infant girl weighed only 3 pounds, 9 ounces and was also the first occupant of the hospital's prized incubator.

=== Hospital Additions ===
In 1948, after weathering the Great Depression and World War II, Hospital Administrator Herbert S. Wright announced that the hospital was debt free for the first time. The Board of Directors then decided to plan a 40-bed addition to the over-crowded hospital. The community once again extended a helping hand and contributed $48,000 toward the $70,000 cost of the addition. The building was completed in 1949.

In 1954, thanks in part to the baby boom, there was once again a need to expand the hospital. This time the expansion was a major one. The new addition, completed in 1957, doubled the bed capacity of the hospital to about 153 beds and included five operating rooms. As the new addition (to be known as the South Addition) was being completed, it was decided to remodel the 1928 structure. The addition to the hospital, plus remodeling of the original building, made an overall investment of $4.1 million.

In 1964, maximum occupancy was the general rule in the hospital. On most days, there was a "to call" list of patients waiting to enter Southeast as soon as there was a vacant bed. Plans for another addition began to take shape, this time a 54-bed addition on two floors constructed with $461,395 in cash and pledges and a matching grant from the Hill-Burton fund.

Throughout the 1970s, construction and expansion continued at the hospital. Another new wing, part of a four-stage, five-year development program, was dedicated in 1973 to the west of the original hospital structure. A multi-level parking garage was completed; and a three-floor addition to the east wing was accomplished.

The 1980s were also marked by expansion. The $3 million Regional Cancer Center was completed in 1981. In 1983, the $6.34 million Robert D. Harrison Annex was opened and Southeast began offering open heart surgery in this new facility. In 1987, Southeast's Obstetrics and Gynecology Center was renovated and renamed after Dennis B. Elrod.

In 1990, the Board of Trustees approved the establishment of the Southeast Hospital School of Nursing. Originally started as an LPN to RN program, the school received approval from the State Board of Nursing in 1993 to transition to an associate degree of Nursing Program. In 1991, the hospital opened a $1.2 million addition to the Harrison Annex. Also in 1991, a 178-vehicle parking garage was completed on the western edge of the hospital campus.

In 1992, Southeast embarked on another major expansion program. The five-year, multi-stage hospital development program included a climate-controlled pedestrian corridor connecting to the main hospital and a mechanical building, both completed in 1993. The 105,000-square-foot (9,800 m^{2}) Clinical Services Building was completed in the fall of 1994. It included three main areas: Emergency Services on the ground floor, the Surgery Department on the first floor and the LifeBeat Air Medical Service on the fourth level. As soon as the project was completed, the hospital started on the third phase of the development plan - construction of a new lobby wing which was completed in 1996. The last phase of the development plan, the redesign of the northwest exterior facade, was completed in 1997.

In 2000, the hospital began construction on the addition of two new medical/surgical floors atop the Harrison Annex. The project was completed in 2005 and increased the number of private patient rooms from 39 to 107. In 2003, the hospital broke ground on a 75,000-square-foot (7,000 m^{2}), four-floor medical office building named Southeast Medical Plaza, which opened in the spring of 2006.

The hospital has built a $33 million cancer center on the west campus of the hospital, next to Interstate 55. The new Regional Cancer Center was scheduled to open in December 2010.

Sports Medicine:

In January 2019, SoutheastHealth and Southeast Hospital began their Department of Orthopedics and Sports Medicine under the direction of the newly appointed Chairman, Anthony A. McPherron, DO, MBA. Dr. McPherron had previously served as the team physician at Virginia Tech and also at Western Carolina University. Southeast Health Orthopedics and Sports Medicine was shortly thereafter named the official sports medicine provider for the Cape Catfish Baseball team, a member of the prospect league.

In August 2019, SoutheastHealth and Southeast Missouri State University (SEMO) announced a new affiliation agreement whereby Southeast Health Orthopedics and Sports Medicine would be named the team physicians for all of the NCAA Division 1 athletics programs at SEMO as well as provide care for the students at the Holland College of Arts and Media for all of the performing arts students in the dance, theater, and music programs. Dr. McPherron was named the head team physician - Orthopedics and Dr. Andrew Lawrence was named as head team physician - primary care. Southeast Health Hospital has also been named as the team physicians for multiple area high schools and supplies certified athletic trainers to the Cape Catfish, SEMO, and the high schools.

== Southeast Hospital College of Nursing and Health Sciences ==
The Southeast Hospital College of Nursing and Health Sciences (SEH) is a 2-year private institution of higher learning that specializes in health care careers. The college is owned by Southeast Missouri Hospital.

The original Southeast Missouri Hospital School of Nursing opened in 1928 along with the hospital. The School of Nursing transitioned to the College of Nursing with approval being granted by the Missouri State Board of Nursing in 1995. In 1999, the college got its current name when the surgical technology program was opened. In May 2005, the college received its initial accreditation by The Higher Learning Commission.

Combining general education with professional training, SEH College offers a Bachelor of Science in nursing program as well as associate degrees in arts, nursing, and radiologic technology. Popular majors include nursing, radiologic technician, and surgical technologist. SEH College also provides clinical experience and hands-on learning at Southeast Hospital.
