= Robert D. Orr =

American politician and diplomat (1917–2004)

Robert Orr
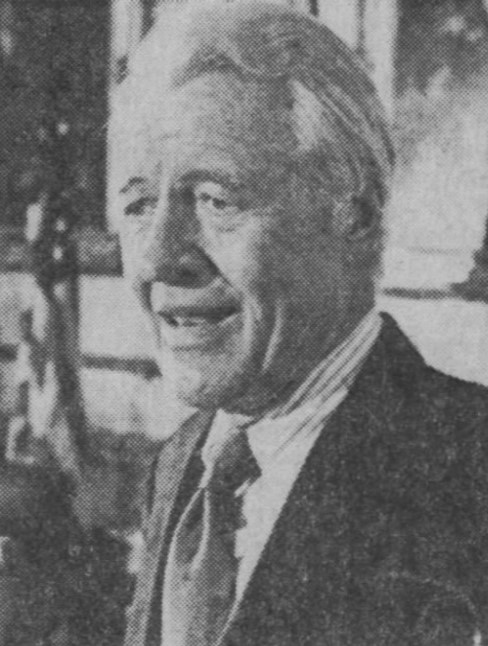

United States Ambassador to Singapore
- In office July 14, 1989 – September 12, 1992
- President: George H. W. Bush
- Preceded by: Daryl Arnold
- Succeeded by: Jon Huntsman

45th Governor of Indiana
- In office January 12, 1981 – January 9, 1989
- Lieutenant: John Mutz
- Preceded by: Otis Bowen
- Succeeded by: Evan Bayh

44th Lieutenant Governor of Indiana
- In office January 8, 1973 – January 12, 1981
- Governor: Otis R. Bowen
- Preceded by: Richard E. Folz
- Succeeded by: John Mutz

18th Chair of the National Lieutenant Governors Association
- In office 1977–1978
- Preceded by: William P. Hobby Jr.
- Succeeded by: Thomas P. O'Neill III

Member of the Indiana Senate from the 26th district
- In office November 6, 1968 – November 8, 1972 Serving with Sidney S. Kramer, Philip H. Hayes
- Preceded by: Elmo F. Holder
- Succeeded by: Don Larry Park

Personal details
- Born: Robert Dunkerson Orr; November 17, 1917 Ann Arbor, Michigan, U.S.
- Died: March 10, 2004 (aged 86) Indianapolis, Indiana, U.S.
- Resting place: Crown Hill Cemetery and Arboretum, Section 24, Lot 63
- Party: Republican
- Spouses: Josie Wallace (m. 1944; div. 2000) Mary Davis (m. 2001)
- Children: 3
- Education: Yale University (BA); Harvard University

Military service
- Allegiance: United States
- Branch/service: United States Army
- Years of service: 1941–1946
- Rank: Major
- Battles/wars: World War II • Pacific Theater
- Awards: Legion of Merit

Robert Dunkerson Orr (November 17, 1917 – March 10, 2004) was an American politician and diplomat who served as the 45th governor of Indiana from 1981 to 1989. A member of the Republican Party, he served as United States Ambassador to Singapore from 1989 to 1992 under President George H. W. Bush.

== Early life ==
Robert D. Orr was born in Ann Arbor, Michigan, where his family was vacationing, on November 17, 1917, the last of the three children of Samuel Lowery and Louise Dunkerson Orr. His father was an industrialist with interests in many companies whose holdings were centralized in the Orr Iron Company. Orr grew up in Evansville, Indiana, where his father's company was headquartered. His family have lived in the area for three generations.

He attended local public schools for most of his early education, but transferred to the Hotchkiss School in Connecticut before his final year of high school beginning in 1934. Upon graduation he was accepted to Yale University, enrolling in 1936. At Yale, he was a member of Delta Kappa Epsilon fraternity (Phi chapter). He earned a bachelor's degree in 1940 and then enrolled in Harvard Business School.

After the outbreak of World War II, he left Harvard without graduating to join the Army. He was admitted to Officer's Candidate School and after completing his course served on the staff of the quartermaster's general staff in the Pacific Theater, eventually rising to the rank of major. For his service, he was awarded the Legion of Merit. He met Joanne "Josie" Wallace who served in the Women Air Force Service Pilots, while he was serving. They were married in 1944, settled in Evansville, and eventually had three children.

After returning home, Orr entered into the family business and became active in Republican politics of Vanderburgh County. Many Evansville factories had been creating war implements, and the end of the conflict led many of them to close. Orr began purchasing vacated factories, refurbishing them to produce goods, and selling them. Through his activity, he became involved in a local economic development committee. His business and holdings expanded rapidly and by 1953 he was on the board of twenty local businesses including Erie Investments, Sterling Brewers, and Evansville Metal Products, and was director of twelve other companies. He was on several civic boards including the Rotary Club, Evansville YMCA, Willard Library, Buffalo Trace Council of Boy Scouts of America, and the Presbyterian Church of Evansville. Because of his community service, he was awarded the Jaycees Young Man of the Year award in 1953. As a result of the award, he was invited to serve as a trustee of Hanover College, a position he held for decades.

== Political career ==
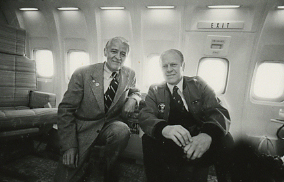
Orr with President Gerald Ford in 1976

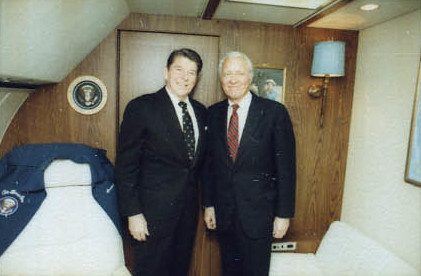
Orr with President Ronald Reagan in 1982

Orr first became involved in politics in 1950 as a member of a local Republican Party advisory board. In 1951 he became chairman of the local party; he served until 1954. He was a precinct committeeman for eight years, and in 1958 became treasurer for the Eighth District Republican Committee, a position he held until 1960. In 1965 he was elected chairman of the Vanderburgh County Republican Central Committee; he held that position for six years.

In 1968 he was elected to the Indiana Senate, representing Evansville. He served there until 1973. In 1972, he was nominated at the State Republican Convention to run for Lieutenant Governor on a ticket with Otis R. Bowen. The election campaign focused largely on their opponents' records of raising taxes, and they won the election with 56.8 percent of the vote. As lieutenant governor, Orr oversaw the state agricultural bureau and was director of the Indiana Department of Commerce. Orr drew on his experience in economic development in Evansville to put in a place a statewide economic growth plan. He convinced state leaders to fund the creation of two Port of Indiana ports on the Ohio River, one at Mount Vernon and other at Jeffersonville, and he launched a successful tourist attraction campaign. Orr vote five tie-breaking votes in the Indiana Senate during his term, including one that passed Bowen's tax reorganization plan, drastically lowering property taxes, requiring local taxing authorities to receive state-level approval to raise taxes, while increasing the state sales tax. Orr and Bowen were re-elected to office in 1976.

Orr was popular statewide because of his economic plans and for being associated with the tax reorganization plan. With Bowen's backing, he ran unopposed for the Republican nomination to run for governor in 1980. In the general election, he was opposed by Democrat John Hillenbrand. Orr focused on connecting himself with the popular Governor Bowen; his slogan was "Let's Keep a Good Thing Going." He easily defeated Hillenbrand, 1,257,383 (57.7 percent) to 913,116 (41.9 percent) votes.

As governor, he oversaw the reform of the Indiana educational system. In 1984, he defeated State Senator Wayne Townsend of Hartford City to win a second term as governor: 1,146,497 (52.8 percent of the two-party vote) to 1,036,832 (47.2 percent). An ad from the 1984 campaign, which featured an actress playing a fortune teller and a singer with a Daryl Hall style mullet, was featured on an episode of CNN's Not Just Another Cable News Show. In the 1984 election, Orr polled 110,886 fewer votes than he had in 1980, and his overall percent dropped by 4.9.

In 1986, Orr served as president of the Council of State Governments and as the chairman of the Midwestern Governors Association.

After his terms as governor, Orr was named by U.S. President George H. W. Bush as the U.S. Ambassador to Singapore, a position that he held until 1992.

After he left his ambassadorship, Orr established a consulting firm called the Alliance for Global Commerce, which focused on international trade and export issues.

In 2000, he and his wife, Joanne "Josie" Wallace, divorced. In 2001, at the age of eighty-three, he married Mary Kay Davis. On March 10, 2004, Orr died at the age of eighty-six at the Indiana University Medical Center in Indianapolis from complications following kidney surgery. He is buried in Crown Hill Cemetery in Indianapolis.

The portion of Interstate 69 south of its interchange with Interstate 64, at one time labeled Interstate 164, is named the "Robert D. Orr Highway" in his honor.

== Electoral history ==
1980 Indiana gubernatorial election
Party	Candidate	Votes	%
Republican	Robert D. Orr	1,257,383	57.72
Democratic	John A. Hillenbrand II	913,116	41.92
American	Cletis Artist	7,904	0.36

1984 Indiana gubernatorial election
Party	Candidate	Votes	%
Republican	Robert D. Orr	1,146,497	52.16
Democratic	Wayne Townsend	1,036,922	47.18
American	Rockland Snyder	7,455	0.34
Libertarian	James A. Ridenour	7,114	0.32

== See also ==
- List of governors of Indiana
- Robert D. Orr (bust), a 1989 public artwork by American artist Don Ingle

Indiana Senate
Preceded by Elmo F. Holder	Member of the Indiana Senate from the 26th district 1968–1972; Served alongside: Sidney S. Kramer, Philip H. Hayes	Succeeded by Don Larry Park
Political offices
Preceded by Richard E. Folz	Lieutenant Governor of Indiana; 1973–1981	Succeeded by John Mutz
Preceded by Otis R. Bowen	Governor of Indiana; 1981–1989	Succeeded by Evan Bayh
Party political offices
Preceded by Richard E. Folz	Republican nominee for Lieutenant Governor of Indiana; 1980, 1976	Succeeded by John Mutz
Preceded by Otis R. Bowen	Republican nominee Governor of Indiana; 1980, 1984	Succeeded by John Mutz
Preceded by James R. Thompson	Chair of the Republican Governors Association; 1982–1983	Succeeded by Victor G. Atiyeh
Diplomatic posts
Preceded by Daryl Arnold	United States Ambassador to Singapore; 1989–1992	Succeeded by Jon Huntsman
