= Albert Spradling Jr. =

American politician and attorney

Albert M. Spradling Jr.

Member of the Missouri Senate from the 27th district
- In office 1952–1977
- Preceded by: D. W. Gilmore

Personal details
- Born: March 13, 1920 Cape Girardeau, Missouri
- Died: October 20, 2004 (aged 84) St. Louis, Missouri
- Party: Democratic
- Spouse: Margaret Whyman
- Children: 2 sons
- Education: Southeast Missouri State College; University of Missouri
- Occupation: politician, FBI agent, city attorney, lawyer

Albert M. Spradling Jr. (March 13, 1920 – October 20, 2004) was an American politician from Cape Girardeau, Missouri, who served in the Missouri Senate. He served as city attorney of Cape Girardeau from 1948 until 1952 when he was elected to the state senate. Spradling was educated in the Cape Girardeau public schools and at the local Southeast Missouri State College and at the University of Missouri. He served in the Missouri Senate for 25 years and as president pro tem for four years in the early 1960s. During World War II, Spradling worked as an FBI agent in California.

His son Albert M. Spradling, III served as mayor of Cape Girardeau from 1994 until 2002.
