= 1984 Indiana gubernatorial election =

- November 6, 1984
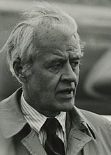

Nominee	Robert D. Orr	Wayne Townsend
Party	Republican	Democratic
Running mate	John Mutz	Ann DeLaney
Popular vote	1,146,497	1,036,922
Percentage	52.16%	47.18%
- County results Orr: 50–60% 60–70% Townsend: 40–50% 50–60% 60–70%
Governor before election
Robert D. Orr
Republican
Elected Governor
Robert D. Orr
Republican

The 1984 Indiana gubernatorial election was held on November 6, 1984, in all 92 counties of Indiana. Robert D. Orr, the state's incumbent Republican governor, who defeated former State Treasurer John Snyder for the nomination, was comfortably reelected to a second term, defeating State Senator Wayne Townsend and two minor party challengers in the general election. His victory marked the fifth consecutive victory for the Republican Party in Indiana gubernatorial elections, and the last time Republicans would win the governorship in the 20th century.

Despite losing the election, Townsend, who defeated former United States Attorney Virginia Dill McCarty for the nomination, received 195,351 more votes than the Democratic nominee for president, Walter Mondale, who won less than 38% of the vote in Indiana and was handily defeated by Ronald Reagan in the presidential election of 1984. Townsend's running mate, former Marion County Deputy Prosecutor Ann DeLaney, was the first woman ever to run for Lieutenant Governor of Indiana in the history of the state.

== General election ==
Indiana gubernatorial election, 1984
Party	Candidate	Votes	%
Republican	Robert D. Orr (incumbent)	1,146,497	52.16
Democratic	Wayne Townsend	1,036,922	47.18
American	Rockland Snyder	7,455	0.34
Libertarian	James A. Ridenour	7,114	0.32
Total votes		2,197,988	100.0
Republican hold			
