= Colonel George C. Thilenius House =

Historic house in Missouri, United States

- U.S. National Register of Historic Places
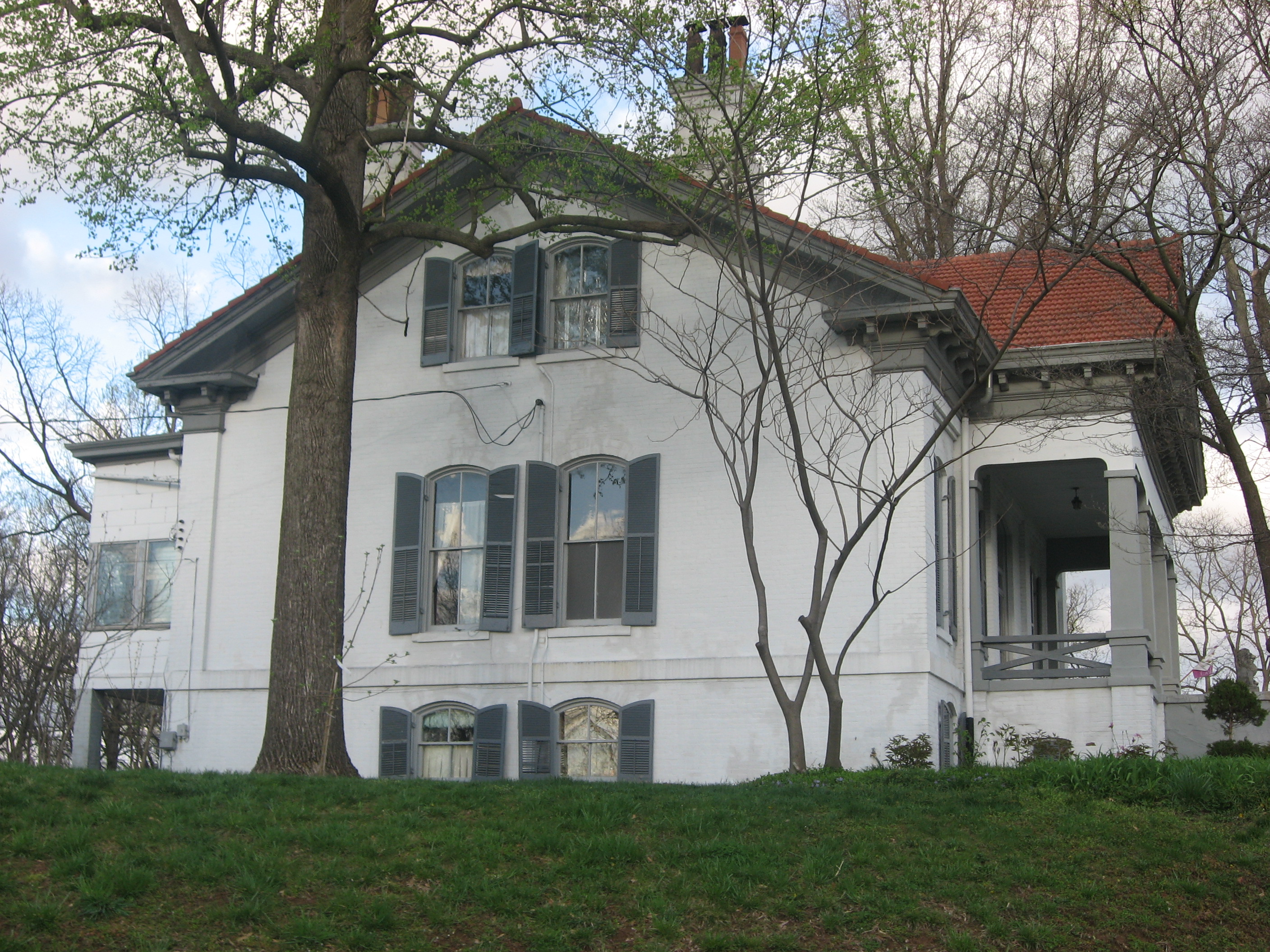
- Colonel George C. Thilenius House, April 2013

- Location within Missouri Location within the United States
- Location: 100 Longview Pl., Cape Girardeau, Missouri
- Coordinates: 37°18′23″N 89°32′46″W
- Area: 1.4 acres (0.57 ha)
- Built: 1870-1873
- Built by: Thilenius, George C.
- Architectural style: Greek Revival
- NRHP reference No.: 83000974
- Added to NRHP: April 14, 1983

Colonel George C. Thilenius House, also known as Longview, is a historic home located at Cape Girardeau, Missouri. It was built between 1870 and 1873, and is a 2 1/2-story, painted red brick dwelling with Greek Revival style design elements. It sits on a stuccoed sandstone foundation and has a cross-gable roof. Also on the property are the remains of the old Thilenius Winery.

It was listed on the National Register of Historic Places in 1983.
