= Wayne Townsend =

American politician

Member of the Indiana Senate from the 19th district
- In office November 8, 1972 – November 5, 1986
- Preceded by: John Mutz
- Succeeded by: Larry David Macklin

Member of the Indiana Senate from the 13th district
- In office November 4, 1970 – November 8, 1972
- Preceded by: Frank James Biddinger
- Succeeded by: John Frederick Augsburger

Member of the Indiana House of Representatives from Blackford County and Grant County
- In office November 7, 1962 – November 9, 1966
- Preceded by: Ray Manual Hickam
- Succeeded by: Roger Lee Jessup
- In office November 5, 1958 – November 9, 1960
- Preceded by: James O. Murrell
- Succeeded by: Ray Manual Hickam

Personal details
- Born: May 1, 1926 Grant County, Indiana, U.S.
- Died: July 3, 2015 (aged 89) South Haven, Michigan, U.S.
- Party: Democratic
- Spouse: Helen
- Relations: M. Clifford Townsend (grandfather)
- Children: five
- Education: Purdue University (1951)
- Occupation: farmer

W. Wayne Townsend (May 1, 1926 – July 3, 2015) was an American politician from the U.S. state of Indiana. A Democrat, he was his party's gubernatorial nominee in 1984. Townsend was defeated by the incumbent Republican governor Robert D. Orr.

== Gubernatorial campaigns ==
Townsend twice ran for Governor of Indiana. In 1980, he lost the Democratic Party primary election to businessman John A. Hillenbrand II. In 1984, he received the Democratic nomination but lost the election to Robert D. Orr (the incumbent Republican).

Party political offices
Preceded by John A. Hillenbrand II	Democratic nominee for Governor of Indiana; 1984	Succeeded by Evan Bayh
