= List of 2020 Women's March locations (October) =

2020 Women's March (October)
- Part of the Women's rights movement
- Date: October 17, 2020
- Location: United States
- Methods: Protest march

This is a list of the second wave of 2020 Women's March events in October, most of which took place on October 17, and some later.

== United States ==
Listed below are the marches in the U.S.

- AL
- AK
- AZ
- AR
- CA
- CO
- CT
- DC
- DE
- FL
- GA
- HI
- ID
- IL
- IN
- IA
- KS
- KY
- LA
- ME
- MD
- MA
- MI
- MN
- MS
- MO
- MT
- NE
- NV
- NH
- NJ
- NM
- NY
- NC
- ND
- OH
- OK
- OR
- PA
- RI
- SC
- SD
- TN
- TX
- UT
- VT
- VA
- WA
- WV
- WI
- WY

	Approximate attendance	Notes
Washington, D.C.	10,000+	Thousands of people congregated at Freedom Plaza and marched to the U.S. Supreme Court, to protest the nomination of Judge Amy Coney Barrett for a seat left vacant by the recently deceased Justice Ruth Bader Ginsburg, and to rally for support against President Trump before the Nov. 3 election, then marched to the National Mall.

State	Date	Cities	Approximate attendance	Notes
Alabama		Huntsville	few dozen	Meridian St Lot - Courthouse
Alabama		Mobile	dozens	Memorial Park
Alaska		Bethel	8	virtual event held (w/ yard signs)
Alaska		Homer	50	WKFL Park, Pioneer Ave & Heath Street
Alaska		Juneau	50	Alaska State Capitol - Mayor Bill Overstreet Park. State Rep. Sara Hannan (D-Juneau) & US congressional candidate Alyse Galvin spoke at the event.
Alaska		Ketchikan	40	march held: bronze sculpture, "The Rock," at Berth 2 - Berth 4 pavilion
Alaska		Palmer	hundreds	Palmer March for Justice at downtown Pavilion
Arizona		Green Valley	dozen	corners of La Canada Drive and Esperanza Blvd
Arizona		Payson	50+	junction of Highways 87 & 260 - Bonita Street
Arizona		Phoenix	hundreds	Phoenix City Hall
Arizona		Tucson	500	2020 Pima County Women's March; Armory Park - Presidio Park. Newly elected Pima County Attorney Laura Conover greeted the crowd.
Arkansas		Little Rock	8	A number of women dressed as Handmaids stood outside Pulaski County Circuit Court.
Arkansas		Rogers		multiple events planned across the city (for the sake of social distancing)
California		Alameda		event planned at Alameda City Hall
California		Brea		event planned at corner of Brea Blvd and Imperial Hwy
California		Brentwood		event planned at Brentwood City Park
California		Castro Valley		event planned at Castro Valley High School, Redwood & Mabel Intersection
California		Chico	50	Despite COVID-19 limitations and the city plaza being shut down for renovations, about 50 people stood, sat, rode their bikes or drove their cars through downtown Saturday (corner of East Fourth Street and Main Street).
California		El Centro	15	event organized by Sure Helpline Crisis Center
California		Encino		voter registration drive planned at Encino Park
California		Garberville	dozen	Garberville Town Square
California		Granada Hills		event planned at Granada Hills Veterans Memorial Park
California		Laguna Niguel		event planned at Capistrano Unified Women's March, Hidden Hills Park
California		Long Beach		Long Beach Rally Against Trump Filling RBG Seat; event planned at corner of Ocean Blvd and Pine Ave
California		Los Angeles	200-300	Pershing Square - L.A. City Hall. Crowd size and route length were limited by COVID-19 restrictions, but emotions remained intense.
California		Monterey	140+	"Soles to the Polls" rally took place at Window on the Bay, followed by a march to a Monterey County ballot box on Del Monte Ave
California		Murphys	at least 2	event held at Murphys Historic Hotel on Main St
California		Napa		event planned at Block of the Superior Courthouse on Brown St.
California		Nevada City	100	Robinson Plaza
California		Palm Springs		event planned at Frances Stevens Park
California		Palos Verdes Estates	25	Malaga Cove Plaza outside City Hall
California		Pasadena	200	Pasadena City Hall
California		Petaluma	nearly 200	Walnut Park
California		Rancho Cucamonga		event planned at corner of Baseline Rd and Milliken Ave
California		Redding	TBD	Due to COVID, Women's March Redding cancelled its in-person rally in favor of a ballot drop at the official drop box outside Redding City Hall.
California		Sacramento	thousands	Cesar Chavez Plaza – Sacramento City Hall
California		San Diego	300+	Balboa Park
California		San Francisco	2,000	Hundreds of people gathered at Civic Center Plaza on McCallister Street, then marched down Market Street to the Embarcadero Center. People held up pro-choice signs and honored the late Supreme Court Justice Ruth Bader Ginsburg. Black Lives Matter and human rights advocates were also marching in solidarity.
California		San Luis Obispo	46	moved from in-person (Mitchell Park) to a virtual gathering
California		San Mateo	7	El Camino Real at Third Ave; event organized by a local group calling themselves the “Raging Grannies”
California		Santa Cruz	hundreds	Santa Cruz City Hall
California		Santa Maria	dozens	The Women's March of Santa Maria Valley invited the community to Central Plaza Park Saturday to encourage voters to cast their ballots early.
California		Seal Beach	TBD	A rally was held at The Big Tree near Parking Lot (NW corner of intersection); demonstrators jammed Main Street as cars squeezed past pedestrians
California		Torrance		South Bay Women's March planned at Torrance City Hall
California		Truckee	100+	Donner Pass Rd, west of the Eagle Statue at Spring Street
California		Tujunga		event planned at Albertson's om Foothill Blvd.
California		Turlock	~20	Turlock, CA had its first Women's March at Rotary International Park
California		Westlake Village		A "Women's March Rally for Joe & Kamala" was planned a The Promenade at Westlake.
Colorado		Carbondale	150	The Goat Kitchen & Bar, 995 Cowen Drive
Colorado		Denver	hundreds	The Fillmore Auditorium - State Capitol Building
Colorado		Durango	200+	People marched from Durango & Silverton Narrow Gauge Railroad Depot to Buckley Park, along the sidewalk of Main Ave.
Colorado		Lakewood	70	sign holding demonstration at Alameda Ave & Wadsworth Blvd
Colorado		Steamboat Springs	60	West Lincoln Park - Rich Weiss Park
Connecticut		Stamford	300	Stamford Superior Courthouse. Organizers from S.W.A.T. (Suburban Women Against Trump) along with a few other women's rights groups, including PinkWave and the Stamford Women's Talking Circle, stood in solidarity with Women's Marches across the country. U.S. Sen. Richard Blumenthal & U.S. Rep. Jim Himes stood among the crowd, taking pictures and fielding comments from constituents.
Delaware		Millsboro		Women's March of Sussex County; event planned at Pool Area, Roost Way
Florida		Cocoa Beach	dozens	Space Coast Women's March; W. Cocoa Beach Causeway - Holmes Cape Canaveral Hospital
Florida		Fernandina Beach	100+	Central Park, 1200 Atlantic Ave
Florida		Fort Lauderdale	couple hundred	Broward County Courthouse - Fort Lauderdale City Hall
Florida		Fort Myers	300	McGregor Blvd - MLK Blvd
Florida		Gainesville	150 - 300	Depot Park - Bo Diddley Plaza
Florida	Oct. 18	Miami	several dozen	At Women's March Miami's base camp in Wynwood, a "GOTV Day of Action" rally was held. Several female candidates for office, including mayoral candidate Daniella Levine Cava, spoke at the event.
Florida		Ocala	5	Ocala Town Square
Florida		Sarasota	800	Unconditional Surrender statue, Bayfront Drive - John Ringling Causeway
Florida		Tallahassee	150+	Florida Supreme Court
Florida		Tampa	few dozen	Curtis Hixon Waterfront Park, along North Ashley Drive
Florida		The Villages	50+	In honor of the late Supreme Court Justice Ruth Bader Ginsburg, a golf cart caravan/parade was held from Spanish Springs Town Square (Lady Lake) to Lake Sumter Landing, followed by a short march along the Lake Sumter Landing boardwalk.
Florida		Vero Beach	100	About 100 women and a few men marched on the Merrill P. Barber Bridge.
Florida		Williston	~30	First ever Women's March in Levy County took place at Heritage Park Pavilion on Main Street
(Georgia (U.S. state)) Georgia		Athens	50-100	Athens-Clarke County City Hall
(Georgia (U.S. state)) Georgia		Atlanta	dozens	Georgia State Capitol
(Georgia (U.S. state)) Georgia		Rome	150	Town Green - Floyd County Administration Building
Hawaii		Honolulu	400	2020 Women's March Oahu; Hawaii State Capitol
Idaho		Coeur d'Alene	300+	Riverstone Park
Illinois		Algonquin	8	Together We Rise Women's March; Randall Road and Commons Dr.
Illinois		Aurora	at least a few	Together We Rise Women's March; Randall Road and Sullivan Road
Illinois		Batavia	25	Together We Rise Women's March; intersection of Randall Road and West Wilson Street
Illinois		Buffalo Grove	200	Mike Rylko Community Park
Illinois		Champaign	hundreds	West Side Park
Illinois		Chicago	several hundred	Federal Court Plaza in the Loop (outside 7th Circuit Courthouse, where Amy Coney Barrett currently served) – Daley Plaza. Chicago Mayor Lori Lightfoot spoke at an online rally, Zoom to the Polls, by the Women's March Chicago chapter.
Illinois		Des Plaines	several dozen	sidewalks at intersection of East Oakton Street & Manheim Road
Illinois		Downers Grove	22	event held at Belmont Metra Train Station, Parking Lot H
Illinois		Evanston	50+	Evanston Rally for Democracy was held in Dawes Park.
Illinois		Elgin	26	Together We Rise Women's March; Randall Road and Bowes Road (event joined by Occupy Elgin)
Illinois		Geneva	45+	Together We Rise Women's March – Rather than meeting at high capacity at one location, people in Kane County spread across a 30-mile section of Randall Road, extending north & south from Algonquin to Aurora; between 200 & 400 participants were expected. In Geneva, 45 people met at Geneva Commons (between Williamsburg Ave and Britcher Rd) before marching to Randall Road. Candidate for state Rep Martha Paschke stopped by the rally.
Illinois		Glenview	250	Glenview Women's March; Jackman Park
Illinois		Morris	60	Chapin Park
Illinois		Orland Park	30+	southwest corner of 151st and Wolf Road
Illinois		Oswego	100	Hudson Crossing Park
Illinois		Ottawa	25	sign-holding event held along Jordan Block, Main Street
Illinois		Rockford	34	Davis Park
Illinois		St. Charles	13	Together We Rise Women's March; intersection of Randall Road and North Ave
Indiana		Goshen	at least 4	Due to a surge in COVID-19 cases in Elkhart County, the event was moved from Goshen Courthouse East Lawn to a virtual online Facebook gathering. Event organizer & candidate for the Indiana House of Representatives Amanda Qualls was joined by three other speakers.
Indiana		Indianapolis	200+	Crossroads of Democracy Day of Action; Indiana State Capitol. The event was hosted by Artivism, Indiana Nasty Women, and the Indiana Black Legislative Caucus. Some attendees wielded flyswatters, a playful jab at the fly that sat on Mike Pence's head for two minutes during the vice-presidential debate. Gubernatorial candidate Woody Myers, candidate for attorney general Jonathan Weinzapfel, U.S. Rep. André Carson, and candidate for Indiana state Senate Belinda Drake, all of them Democrats, attended and spoke at the event.
Indiana		Muncie	100+	Delaware County Building (more of a stationary protest than a “march”) Speakers included state Rep. Sue Errington (D-Muncie), US Congressional candidate Jeannine Lee Lake, and Woody Myers' running mate Linda Lawson.
Indiana		South Bend	200	Howard Park
Iowa		Decorah	40+	”We Dissent” march; Mary Christopher Park - Winneshiek County Courthouse
Iowa		Des Moines	dozens	Pappajohn Sculpture Park - Neal Smith Federal Building
Iowa		Mason City	80+	Central Park, 10 1st St NW - Court House
Kansas		Wichita	90+	Rock the Vote ICT, Old Town Square; event hosted by League of Women Voters Wichita-Metro and Women's March Air Capital Wichita Kansas
Kentucky		Louisville	40-60	The group Viva La Femme held an event at Cherokee Park. By this time, following the shooting of Louisville native Breonna Taylor, protesting had become a daily ritual in the city with the Black Lives Matter movement.
Louisiana		New Orleans	200	In spite of confusion over access to police escort, the NOLA Women's March 2020 saw 200 people come to City Hall Saturday afternoon, where early voting was already underway.
Maine	Oct. 18	Belfast	31	Waldo County Courthouse - gazebo in Boathouse Park
Maine	Oct. 18	Eastport	60	Shead High School
Maine		Portland	100	Monument Square
Maryland		Baltimore	200	US District Courthouse, Lombard Street – City Hall. Organizers of the Baltimore event included representatives of Baltimore Women United, NARAL Pro-Choice Maryland and Planned Parenthood.
Massachusetts		Amherst	10	sidewalk near Town Common, 4 Boltwood Ave
Massachusetts		Andover	50+	Multiple generations – mostly women – stood in the rain Saturday morning at Shawsheen Square.
Massachusetts		Arlington	24	sidewalk vigil on Massachusetts Avenue, walk to Arlington Town Hall & back
Massachusetts		Boston	300 - 1,000	People rallied on the Boston Common near the State House, then marched around the Common and through City Plaza down to Faneuil Hall; organized by UMass Amherst student Siobhan Reidy. State Rep. Lindsay Sabadosa (Northampton) was present, as was Boston city councilor and 2021 mayoral candidate Michelle Wu.
Massachusetts		Centerville	20	corner of Rte 28 & Old Stage Rd
Massachusetts		Great Barrington	200	Great Barrington Town Hall
Massachusetts		Hopkinton	120+	Participants marched around the Hopkinton Town Common eight times; Senate President Karen E. Spilka & State Rep. Carolyn Dykema spoke to the crowd.
Massachusetts		Hyannis	7	Barnstable Airport Rotary, 364 Barnstable Rd
Massachusetts		Mashpee	22	Mashpee Rotary, 10 Bates Road
Massachusetts		Nantucket	dozens	Nantucket Town and County Building, across from the Whaling Museum
Massachusetts		New Bedford	300	Buttonwood Park, Brownell Avenue
Massachusetts		Northampton	20-30	sidewalk intersection of Main and Pleasant St
Massachusetts		Orleans	40-50	Eastham/Orleans Rotary
Massachusetts		Plymouth	74	Brewster Gardens
Massachusetts		Sandwich	10	Mill Creek Park
Massachusetts		Scituate	85	Scituate Town Hall lawn
Massachusetts		Worcester	dozens	sidewalk of Worcester City Hall
Michigan		Ann Arbor	100+	Dozens of people gathered at the University of Michigan Diag, with guest speakers U.S. Rep. Debbie Dingell, Washtenaw County Commissioner Shannon Beeman, and State Reps. Donna Lasinski and Rebekah Warren addressing the crowd. The group then marched downtown to Ann Arbor City Hall.
Michigan		Arcadia	two dozen+	Finch Park – downtown Arcadia and along M-22
Michigan		Auburn Hills	22	Women's March Oakland kicked off a mobile march (with decorated cars) at Riverside Park in Auburn Hills, as a brief launch for the Women's March Landing Rally, the event's main rally, at Hallwood Plaza in Flint.
Michigan		Battle Creek	dozen	Sojourner Truth Memorial
Michigan		Big Rapids	38	Mitchell Creek Park - downtown Big Rapids - Anna Howard Shaw Memorial Park (outside the Big Rapids Community Library). Speakers included Amanda Siggins, candidate for the Michigan House of Representatives and Jerry Hilliard, candidate for the U. S. House of Representatives.
Michigan		Clinton Township	60	Partridge Creek Mall, in front of Nino Salvaggio's International Marketplace
Michigan		Flint	25	Hallwood Plaza
Michigan		Grand Rapids	hundreds	Rosa Parks Circle
Michigan		Kalamazoo	nearly 1,000	Bronson Park
Michigan		Lansing	22	Michigan State Capitol
Michigan		Midland	~90	Midland Central Park Bandshell; event hosted by Women of Michigan Action Network (WOMAN)
Michigan		Monroe	30+	St. Mary's Park - Monroe County Courthouse
Michigan		Traverse City	150	Open Space Park, Grand View Parkway
Michigan		Watersmeet	at least 2	rally held at intersection of Highways US-45 and US-2
Minnesota		Bemidji	100+	Paul Bunyan Drive lakeside sidewalk; some people canoed or kayaked Lake Bemidji's downtown shoreline.
Minnesota		Cambridge		East Central Regional Library parking lot - march downtown
Minnesota		Mankato	hundreds	The Young Women's Christian Association of Mankato, Indivisible St. Peter and Greater Mankato, and partnering agencies came together to host the Mankato All Women's March, which started at Vetter Stone Amphitheater and followed a path up Riverfront Drive and down to the Civic Center Plaza where a rally took place.
Minnesota		Minneapolis	100	1301 University Ave NE
Minnesota		Minnetonka		Women's March MN partnered with Black Lives Matter for Minnetonka's "Good Trouble March for Lives Stolen by Police Violence" at Purgatory Park.
Minnesota		St. Cloud	almost 200	People marched from Great River Regional Library to the Stearns County Courthouse, many supporting the Biden-Harris ticket. Meanwhile, a Trump rally took place along Minnesota Highway 23 in St. Cloud.
Minnesota		St Paul	0	The Rise Up! Women's March event at Minnesota State Capitol was canceled for exceeding a sign-up limit of 250 people; a new online event was planned for Nov 1st
Mississippi		Jackson		virtual ZOOM event
Missouri		Cape Girardeau	dozen+	SEMO Women's March; Freedom Corner at Capaha Park. Kathy Ellis, a candidate for Congress in Missouri's 8th Congressional District, attended.
Missouri		Kansas City	dozens	The Women's March KC: Reale Womxn's Rally gathered at Mill Creek Park.
Missouri		St. Louis	~50	event held at St. Louis City Hall; state Rep. Doug Clemens & candidate for State Treasurer Vicki Englund were present.
Montana		Helena	80	Roughly 80 people braved Helena's first snowstorm of the season at Women's Park.
Montana		Missoula	100	Missoula County Court House - Higgins Ave
Nebraska		Lincoln		event planned at Nebraska State Capitol (north side)
Nebraska		Omaha		event planned at 60th and Dodge Street in front of Memorial Park
Nevada		Baker		Snake Valley Women's March planned: Baker Community Park - Great Basin Visitor Center
Nevada		Fernley		event planned at City Hall, Silver Lace Blvd
Nevada		Henderson		virtual ZOOM meeting planned
Nevada		Las Vegas	~dozen	event held at Federal Courthouse
Nevada		Pahrump		rally & march planned: Nye County Courthouse - Petreck Park
New Hampshire		Portsmouth	34	rally held at Market Square
New Hampshire		Wilton	dozens	event held at Wilton Public Library
New Jersey		Plainfield	300	RGB's Legacy Rally; duCret School of the Arts
New Jersey		Newton	80 - 100	Sussex County NJ Women's March to Save Democracy; The Newton Green
New Mexico		Albuquerque		New Mexico Women's March was originally planned at Civic Plaza on Saturday, but, due to resurgence of COVID-19, became a virtual event within 24 hours prior.
New Mexico		Farmington	0	Farmington Museum (event cancelled)
New Mexico		Santa Fe	0	march to the Roundhouse, Bataan Memorial (event cancelled)
New York		Beacon	~25	Southern Dutchess: Resist! organized a rally at Polhill Park
New York		Buffalo	hundreds	WNY Women's March, held by the Western New York Peace Center, at Niagara Square
New York		Colonie	hundreds	Wolf Rd & Central Ave
New York		Ithaca	dozens	Ithaca Commons at Cornell University (outside Ruth Bade Ginsburg's former dormitory) - Tompkins County courthouse
New York		Long Island City	~30	Court Square Park, Court Square and Jackson Avenue
New York		New York City	hundreds	At least four rallies were planned in the boroughs: Court Square Park in Long Island City, Queens, Snug Harbor in Staten Island, Grand Army Plaza in Brooklyn and Washington Square Park and the New York Stock Exchange in Manhattan
New York		Plattsburgh	200	US Oval - downtown
New York		Rochester	100	Susan B. Anthony Square – Rochester City Hall
New York		Seneca Falls	100+	Women March in Seneca Falls organization held their event at Academy Square, on North Park Street
New York		Syracuse	100+	Clinton Square - Columbus Circle
New York		Utica	100+	Oneida Square, Genesee Street - Munson Williams Proctor Institute. Event organized by Indivisible Mohawk Valley, YWCA Mohawk Valley, Mohawk Valley Latino Association, local union 1199 SEIU, and Citizen Action of Central New York.
New York		Woodstock	43	In back of the Colony, Rock City Road
North Carolina		Charlotte	100+	Dozens of people gathered at First Ward Park to honor Ruth Bader Ginsburg, then marched for about 20 minutes before arriving at the Spectrum Center to cast their 2020 ballots.
North Carolina		Durham	80	Durham County Courthouse
North Carolina		Greensboro	dozens	Triad, Government Plaza; event organized by Josie Markovics, a 17-year-old senior from Page High School
North Carolina		Raleigh	~50	A march in downtown Raleigh, coordinated with the national Women's March in Washington, D.C., took place Saturday afternoon.
North Dakota		(online)	150	The North Dakota Women's March was held online this year due to the spike of COVID-19 cases throughout the state; State Rep. Ruth Buffalo participated.
Ohio		Bluffton	24+	"Women's Ride to Vote" rally held at Democratic Party Headquarters
Ohio		Cleveland	hundreds	Harvard Community Services Center
Ohio	Oct. 24	Columbus	25	Women's March: Vote for Our Lives; Franklin County Board of Elections. Hosted by Ohio Women's Alliance Action Fund, Planned Parenthood Advocates of Ohio and Ohio Women's Alliance
Ohio		Dayton	~30	The “Moms Demand Action” group gathered at Courthouse Square. The range of what the speakers considered "women's issues" included not just the upcoming election and Supreme Court nomination, but also gun violence.
Ohio		Delaware	12	Delaware County Courthouse. One participant was Alaina Shearer, a congressional candidate for Ohio's 12th district.
Ohio		Toledo	16+	Women & men circled the Lucas County Courthouse Square.
Oklahoma		Oklahoma City		virtual event (Facebook, Twitter & ZOOM)
Oklahoma		Tulsa		virtual event planned
Oregon		Bend	150+	Drake Park Pavilion – “Peace Corner” at Wall St & Greenwood Ave; event organized by members of the Central Oregon Red Cloaks. At Peace Corner, there was a drive-by of cars waving flags supporting the Democratic presidential ticket of Joe Biden and Kamala Harris.
Oregon		Brookings	11	Biden/Harris 2020 rally held outside Curry County Democrats office on Chetco Ave
Oregon		Corvallis	20-40	Corvallis Municipal Courthouse
Oregon		Florence	100+	rally held outside Florence City Hall
Oregon		Port Orford	10	rally held at the curve at Highway 101 and 8th Street
Oregon		Portland	hundreds	PDX Women's March; Terry Schrunk Plaza
Pennsylvania		Doylestown	200	At the Intersection of Main and State Street, two dueling political rallies converged, with a pro-Trump parade being greeted by 200 Biden-Harris supporters on the sidewalks.
Pennsylvania		Harrisburg	40	steps of the Pennsylvania State Capitol (Fountain Plaza)
Pennsylvania		Media	several hundred	Media Elementary School,- Media Court House
Pennsylvania		Newtown		event planned at Linton Memorial Fountain and Park
Pennsylvania		Philadelphia	several hundred	The city's “We Dissent” march began at Independence Hall, moved up Market Street towards City Hall, then turned onto Benjamin Franklin towards the Philadelphia Museum of Art.
Pennsylvania		Scranton	40-60	Lackawanna County Courthouse Square
Pennsylvania		Uniontown	125	Fayette County Courthouse
Rhode Island		Little Compton	300	Sakonnet Women's March for Democracy; Veteran's Field - Town Commons triangle. US Senator Jack Reed spoke at the event.
Rhode Island	Oct. 18	Narragansett	dozens	sign holding event, Narragansett Sea Wall
Rhode Island		Providence		event planned at the Rhode Island State House
South Carolina		Charleston	300	”Million Womxn's March”; Colonial Lake - Brittlebank Park
South Carolina		Columbia		event planned outside the South Carolina State House
South Carolina		Lake Wylie		sign holding event on Charlotte Hwy 49 between the Buster Boy Bridge and Hwy 274, honoring the late Justice Ruth Bader Ginsburg
South Dakota		Sioux Falls		event planned at Van Eps Park
Tennessee		Knoxville	dozens	The Women's March Coalition and Indivisible East Tennessee held a rally at Charles Krutch Park, then marched to the City County building and back. State Rep. Gloria Johnson participated.
Tennessee		La Vergne	17	event planned at Veterans Memorial Park
Tennessee		Nashville	hundreds	Participants met up at Cumberland Park and marched along Cumberland River; Democratic US Senate nominee Marquita Bradshaw spoke at the event.
Texas		Austin	hundreds	Women's March Austin supporters gathered outside the Wooldridge Square Park (outside the Texas State Capitol) with a packed agenda. They were met with a variety of counter-demonstrating groups that included the Proud Boys, Trump Supporters with Texans for America, Just Another Channel and InfoWars. Neither side had attempted to contact the other once realizing there was a scheduling conflict, nor was anyone required to obtain permits.
Texas		Dallas		event planned at Dallas City Hall
Texas		Denton		Denton Women's March was held at Denton County Courthouse, led by the Black Rights Organization and Denton Together
Texas		Houston	150+	Houston Federal Courthouse - historic Harris County Courthouse
Texas		San Antonio	~100	Travis Park
Utah		Salt Lake City	200-250	Salt Lake City Hall - Utah State Capitol. Rep Angela Romero (D-Salt Lake City) encouraged everyone to vote.
Vermont		Brattleboro	30+	event held on the Common; State Rep Emilie Kornheiser addressed the crowd.
Vermont		Montpelier	200	Vermont Womxn & Femme March: a BIPOC-led Movement was held at the Vermont State House.
Virginia	Oct. 24	Harrisonburg	dozens	"No Confirmation before Inauguration" march at Court Square; Harrisonburg Mayor Deanna Reed was present
Virginia		Herndon	150	Herndon Town Hall & Green
Virginia		Sterling	12	"HOLD THE SEAT" rally; 21430 Cedar Dr.
Washington		Anacortes	40	Causland Memorial Park; event organized by the Anacortes Activist Student Union
Washington		Bellingham	90+	event held at Bellingham City Hall
Washington		Chehalis	dozens	Chehalis Library - Lewis County Law and Justice Center
Washington		Kirkland	three dozen	Moss Bay Kirkland, corner of Central Way & Lake Street S
Washington		Omak	20-30	Womxn's March Okanogan County; Civic League Park
Washington		Port Angeles	300	319 Lincoln St - Clallam County Courthouse
Washington		Port Townsend	60	intersection of Sims Way and Haines Place
Washington		Seattle	few hundred	Seattle City Hall; march organized by private citizens and unaffiliated with the official Seattle Women's March organization, according to an internet posting
Washington		Vashon	200+	Ober Park
Washington		Wenatchee	20-30	steps of the Chelan County Courthouse
West Virginia		Beckley		event planned at Raleigh County Courthouse; joined by four young Black Americans holding a Breonna Taylor protest.
Wisconsin		Milwaukee	30	Milwaukee County Courthouse
Wisconsin		Muskego	several dozen	corner of Janesville Rd at Moreland Rd
Wisconsin		Racine	25	sign holding rally at Monument Square
Wyoming		Jackson		event planned at Town Square, Broadway & Cache Streets
