= Giaquinta =

Giaquinta is a surname. Notable people with the surname include:

- Alberico Giaquinta (died 1548), Italian Roman Catholic bishop
- Carmelo Giaquinta (1930–2011), Argentine bishop
- Mariano Giaquinta (born 1947), Italian mathematician
- Phil GiaQuinta (born 1964), member of Indiana House of Representatives, district 80

== See also ==
- Giaquinto
