= Alberico =

Alberico is both a masculine Italian given name and a surname. Notable people with the name include:

== Given name ==
- Alberico Albricci (1864–1936), Italian general
- Alberico Archinto (1698–1758), Italian cardinal and papal diplomat
- Alberico I Cybo-Malaspina (1534–1623), Italian prince
- Alberico da Barbiano (c. 1344–1409), Italian condottiero
- Alberico da Romano (1196–1260), Italian condottiero, troubadour and statesman
- Alberico Di Cecco (born 1974), Italian long-distance runner
- Alberico Evani (born 1963), Italian footballer and football manager
- Alberico Gentili (1552–1608), Italian lawyer and jurist
- Alberico Giaquinta (died 1548), Italian Roman Catholic prelate
- Alberico Motta (1937–2019), Italian cartoonist and illustrator
- Alberico Passadore (born 1960), Uruguayan rugby union player

== Surname ==
- Neil Alberico (born 1992), American racing driver
