= 2020 Indiana gubernatorial election =

- November 3, 2020
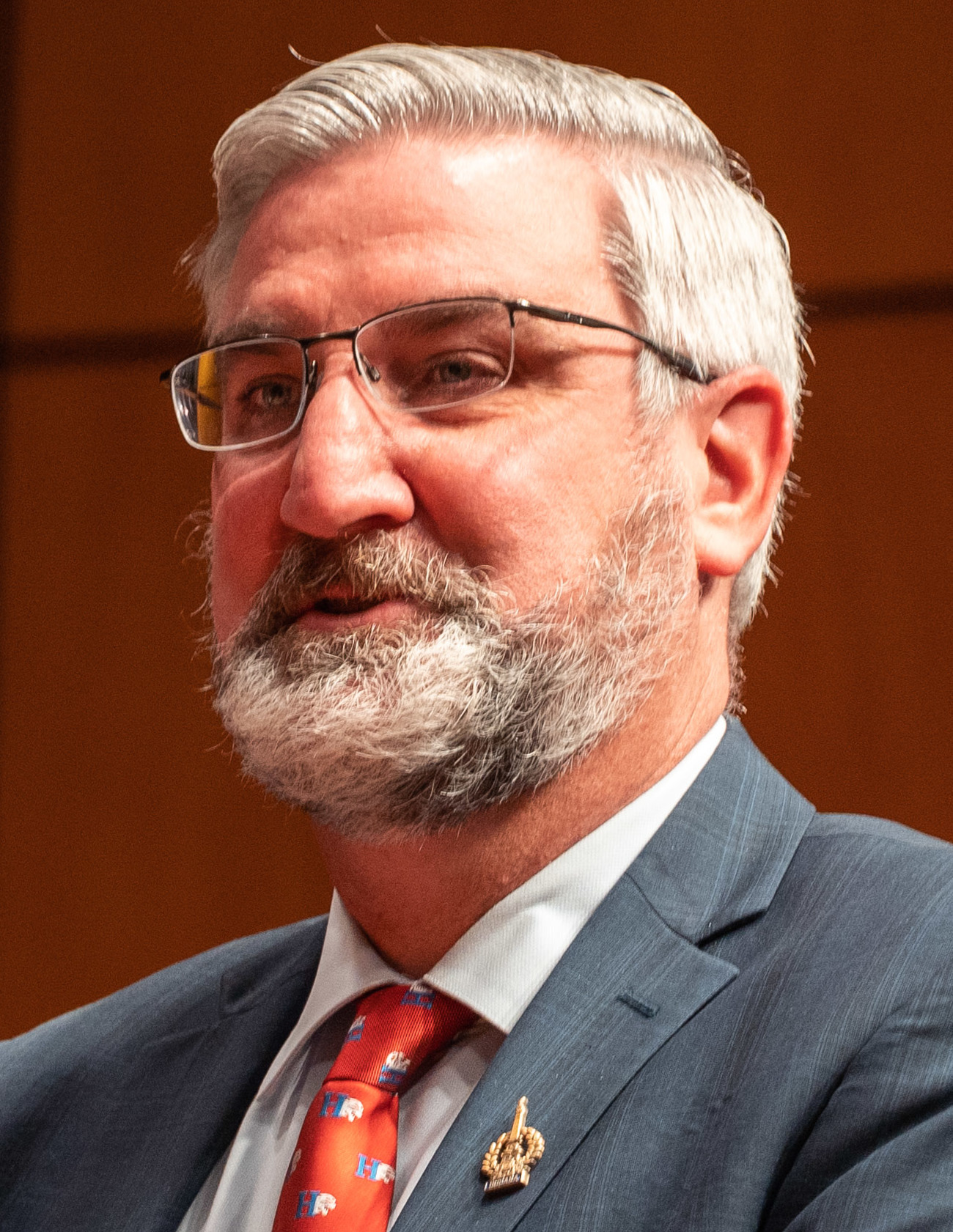

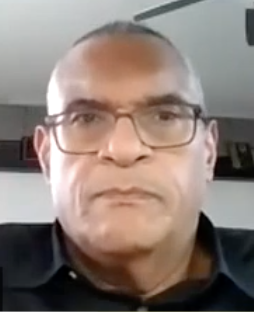

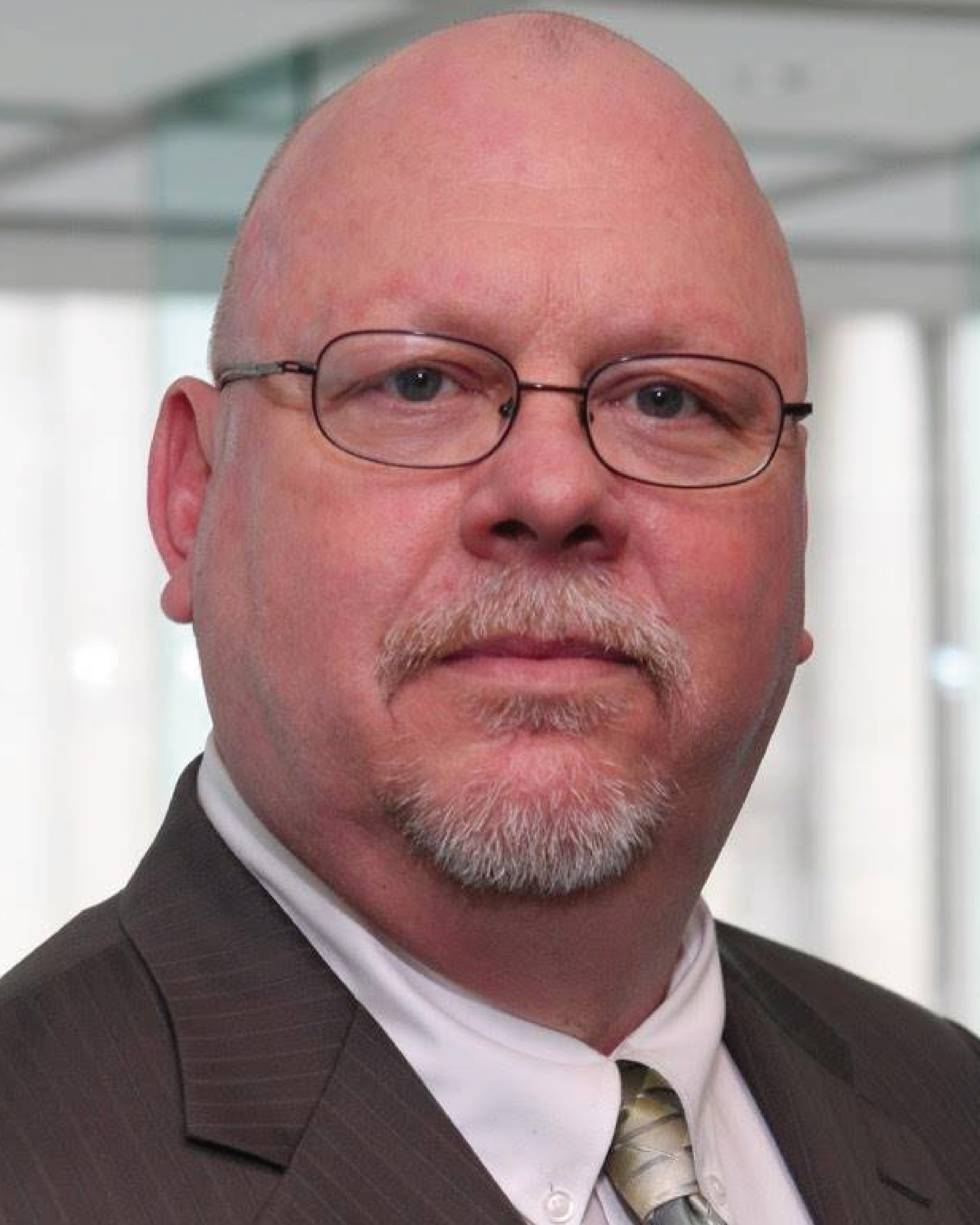
Nominee	Eric Holcomb	Woody Myers	Donald Rainwater
Party	Republican	Democratic	Libertarian
Running mate	Suzanne Crouch	Linda Lawson	William Henry
Popular vote	1,706,727	968,094	345,569
Percentage	56.51%	32.05%	11.44%
- Holcomb: 30–40% 40–50% 50–60% 60–70% 70–80% 80–90% >90% Myers: 40–50% 50–60% 60–70% 70–80% 80–90% >90% Tie: 40–50% 50% No data
Governor before election
Eric Holcomb
Republican
Elected Governor
Eric Holcomb
Republican

The 2020 Indiana gubernatorial election was won by incumbent Republican Eric Holcomb on November 3, 2020. The election was held concurrently with the 2020 U.S. presidential election, as well as elections to the United States House of Representatives and various state and local elections.

Holcomb was eligible to run for re-election to a second term in office, and announced his intention to do so on July 13, 2019, alongside his lieutenant governor, Suzanne Crouch. He faced Democrat Woody Myers, the former health commissioner of Indiana (and later, of New York City) and his running mate, Linda Lawson, the former minority leader of the Indiana House of Representatives, in addition to Libertarian Donald Rainwater, a U.S. Navy veteran and his running mate William Henry. Primary elections were held on June 2; Holcomb and Myers ran unopposed.

In the general election, Holcomb won re-election to a second term. Myers also became the first major party candidate to receive fewer than one million votes since Republican David McIntosh in 2000. The election was also notable for the strong performance of Libertarian candidate Rainwater, who finished in second place, behind Holcomb and ahead of Myers, in over one-third of Indiana's counties, 33 out of 92. The stronger-than-expected performance by Rainwater was perceived to be a reaction to Governor Holcomb's response to the COVID-19 pandemic, with Rainwater pushing for fewer government restrictions.

The Associated Press's large-scale pre-election survey found that Eric Holcomb won white Hoosiers 62–27%, while Myers won black Hoosiers 76–20%.

This election marked the worst performance by a Democratic candidate for governor in Indiana history.

== Republican primary ==
=== Candidates ===
==== Nominee ====
- Eric Holcomb, incumbent governor of Indiana

- Running mate: Suzanne Crouch, incumbent lieutenant governor

==== Removed from ballot ====
- Brian Roth, businessman

==== Declined ====
- Curtis Hill, Attorney General of Indiana (running for re-election)

=== Results ===
Republican primary results
Party	Candidate	Votes	%
Republican	Eric Holcomb (incumbent)	524,496	97.85%
Total votes		524,496	98.66%

== Democratic primary ==
=== Candidates ===
==== Nominee ====
- Woody Myers, business executive and former Indiana Health Commissioner and New York City Health Commissioner

- Running mate: Linda Lawson, former Minority Leader of the Indiana House of Representatives

==== Withdrew ====
- Eddie Melton, state senator from the 3rd district
- Josh Owens, businessman, former chairman of the Indiana Charter School Board, and former Luke Messer congressional staffer (endorsed Myers)

==== Declined ====
- Pete Buttigieg, former mayor of South Bend and former 2020 presidential candidate
- Joe Donnelly, former U.S. senator
- Greg Goodnight, former mayor of Kokomo
- John R. Gregg, former speaker of the Indiana House of Representatives, former state representative from the 45th district, and Democratic nominee for governor in 2012 and 2016
- Christina Hale, state representative from the 87th district and nominee for lieutenant governor in 2016 (running for Indiana's 5th Congressional district)
- Baron Hill, former U.S. representative from Indiana's 9th congressional district (endorsed Myers)
- Joe Hogsett, mayor of Indianapolis
- Karlee Macer, state representative from the 92nd district
- Thomas McDermott Jr., mayor of Hammond (running for Indiana's 1st congressional district)
- Jonathan Weinzapfel, former mayor of Evansville (running for Attorney General)

=== Results ===
Democratic primary results
Party	Candidate	Votes	%
Democratic	Woody Myers	408,230	100.00
Total votes		408,230	100.00

== Libertarian convention ==
=== Candidates ===
==== Nominee ====
- Donald Rainwater, U.S. Navy veteran; Libertarian candidate for Indiana State Senate in 2016 and for Indiana House of Representatives in 2018

- Running mate: William Henry

==== Eliminated at convention ====
- Bill Levin, Grand Poobah of the First Church of Cannabis of Indianapolis

== General election ==
=== Predictions ===
Source	Ranking	As of
The Cook Political Report	Safe R	October 23, 2020
Inside Elections	Safe R	October 28, 2020
Sabato's Crystal Ball	Safe R	November 2, 2020
Politico	Likely R	November 2, 2020
Daily Kos	Safe R	October 28, 2020
RCP	Safe R	November 2, 2020
270towin	Safe R	November 2, 2020

=== Endorsements ===
Eric Holcomb (R)

Organizations

- Huck PAC
- National Federation of Independent Business
- National Right to Life Committee
- NRA Political Victory Fund
Woody Myers (D)

U.S. vice presidents

- Joe Biden, 47th Vice President of the United States (2009-2017), Democratic nominee for the 2020 election

U.S. senators

- Joe Donnelly, former U.S. senator from Indiana (2013–2019), U.S. representative from IN-02 (2007–2013)

U.S. representatives

- André Carson, U.S. representative from IN-07 (2008–present)
- Lee H. Hamilton, former U.S. representative from IN-09 (1965–1999)
- Baron Hill, former U.S. representative from IN-09 (1999–2005, 2007–2011)

State officials

- Jennifer McCormick, 44th Indiana Superintendent of Public Instruction (2017–2021) (Republican)

State senators

- Jean Breaux, Member of the Indiana Senate from the 34th district (2006–2024)
- J. D. Ford, Member of the Indiana Senate from the 34th district (2018–present)
- Tim Lanane, Minority Leader of the Indiana Senate (2008–present) and Member of the Indiana Senate from the 25th district (1997–present)
- Eddie Melton, Member of the Indiana Senate from the 34th district (2016–present)

State representatives

- Ed DeLaney, Member of the Indiana House of Representatives from the 86th district (2009–present)
- Phil GiaQuinta, Minority Leader of the Indiana House of Representatives (2018–present) and Member of the Indiana House of Representatives from the 80th district (2006–present)
- Cherrish Pryor, Member of the Indiana House of Representatives from the 94th district (2007–present)

Local officials

- Pete Buttigieg, former mayor of South Bend, Indiana (2012–2020) and former 2020 Democratic presidential candidate
- Jerome Prince, mayor of Gary, Indiana (2020–present)
Donald Rainwater (L)

Organizations

- Indiana NORML

State representatives

- Jim Lucas, Member of the Indiana House of Representatives from the 69th district (2012–present) (Republican)

Individuals

- Micah Beckwith, pastor and former 2020 Republican candidate for Indiana's 5th congressional district
- Spike Cohen, 2020 Libertarian vice presidential candidate

=== Polling ===
View source data.

Poll source	Date(s) administered	Sample size (Note: Key: A – all adults RV – registered voters LV – likely voters V – unclear)	Margin of error	Eric Holcomb (R)	Woody Myers (D)	Donald Rainwater (L)	Other / Undecided
Cygnal	October 21–23, 2020	600 (LV)	± 4%	47%	29%	15%	10% (Note: Undecided with 10%)
Ragnar Research (R)	October 18–21, 2020	529 (LV)	± 4%	52%	26%	14%	8% (Note: Undecided with 8%)
SurveyUSA (Note: Polling's funding was crowdsourced by Election Twitter.)	October 10–13, 2020	527 (LV)	± 5.2%	55%	25%	10%	11% (Note: Undecided with 11%)
BK Strategies (R) (Note: Poll sponsored by Eric Holcomb's campaign)	October 4–5, 2020	600 (LV)	± 4%	60%	21%	8%	11%
Change Research	September 3–7, 2020	1,033 (LV)	± 3.1%	36%	30%	24%	10%
BK Strategies (R)	May 20–21, 2020	600 (LV)	± 4%	64%	21%	–	15%
Change Research	April 10–13, 2020	1,021 (LV)	± 3.1%	45%	25%	8%	22% (Note: Undecided with 22%)

=== Results ===
Holcomb won reelection by over 24 percentage points, the biggest margin of victory for an Indiana gubernatorial candidate since Evan Bayh in 1992 as well as the biggest ever for a Republican. Exit polls show Holcomb won over 30% of voters who voted for Democrat Joe Biden for president. This is also one of the strongest performances for a third-party candidate in a statewide election in Indiana, with Libertarian nominee Donald Rainwater receiving over 11% of the total vote. Rainwater outperformed Myers in several counties; his best performance was in Putnam County, where he received nearly 26% of the vote.

Indiana gubernatorial election, 2020
Party	Candidate	Votes	%	±%
Republican	Eric Holcomb (incumbent); Suzanne Crouch (incumbent)	1,706,727	56.51	+5.13
Democratic	Woody Myers; Linda Lawson	968,094	32.05	−13.37
Libertarian	Donald Rainwater; William Henry	345,567	11.44	+8.24
Total votes		3,020,388	100.00	N/A
Turnout		3,068,625	65.58	
Registered electors		4,751,370		
Republican hold				

==== By county ====
County	Holcomb/Crouch Republican		Myers/Lawson Democratic		Rainwater/Henry Libertarian		Margin		Total
County	%	#	%	#	%	#	%	#	Total
Adams	9,441	66.7%	2,143	15.1%	2,570	18.2%	6,871	48.5% (Note: Compares margin over Rainwater.)	14,154
Allen	98,406	58.5%	53,895	32.0%	16,011	9.5%	44,511	26.5%	168,312
Bartholomew	21,959	60.9%	9,013	25.0%	5,065	14.1%	12,946	35.9%	36,037
Benton	2,815	68.7%	671	16.4%	614	15.0%	2,144	52.3%	4,100
Blackford	3,333	63.1%	933	17.7%	1,017	19.3%	2,316	43.8%	5,283
Boone	23,737	61.7%	9,661	25.1%	5,094	13.2%	14,076	36.6%	38,492
Brown	4,953	55.3%	2,381	26.6%	1,623	18.1%	2,572	28.7%	8,957
Carroll	6,077	63.9%	1,569	16.5%	1,864	19.6%	4,213	44.3%	9,510
Cass	8,833	58.3%	3,373	22.3%	2,940	19.4%	5,460	36.0%	15,146
Clark	34,669	60.4%	19,077	33.2%	3,680	6.4%	15,592	27.2%	57,426
Clay	8,164	67.0%	1,780	14.6%	2,242	18.4%	5,922	48.6%	12,186
Clinton	7,971	61.8%	2,406	18.7%	2,514	19.5%	5,457	42.3%	12,891
Crawford	3,064	63.1%	1,242	25.6%	553	11.4%	1,822	37.5%	4,859
Daviess	8,313	70.1%	1,531	12.9%	2,016	17.0%	6,297	53.1%	11,860
Dearborn	18,353	72.6%	4,559	18.0%	2,383	9.4%	13,794	54.6%	25,295
Decatur	7,911	64.5%	1,562	12.7%	2,787	22.7%	5,124	41.8%	12,260
Dekalb	13,042	66.9%	3,293	16.9%	3,158	16.2%	9,749	50.0%	19,493
Delaware	26,829	56.0%	15,638	32.6%	5,482	11.4%	11,191	23.4%	47,949
Dubois	14,403	66.7%	4,586	21.2%	2,599	12.0%	9,817	45.5%	21,588
Elkhart	46,223	62.1%	20,512	27.6%	7,690	10.3%	25,711	34.5%	74,425
Fayette	6,933	69.0%	1,707	17.0%	1,414	14.1%	5,226	52.0%	10,054
Floyd	24,972	60.0%	14,948	35.9%	1,669	4.0%	10,024	24.1%	41,589
Fountain	5,189	65.3%	1,150	14.5%	1,613	20.3%	3,576	45.2%	7,952
Franklin	8,633	73.0%	1,690	14.3%	1,499	12.7%	6,943	58.7%	11,822
Fulton	5,436	59.6%	1,603	17.6%	2,084	22.8%	8,617	36.8%	9,123
Gibson	11,607	72.0%	2,990	18.5%	1,533	9.5%	8,617	53.5%	16,130
Grant	16,847	62.3%	5,849	21.6%	4,325	16.0%	10,998	40.7%	27,021
Greene	9,579	65.2%	2,511	17.1%	2,604	17.7%	6,975	47.5%	14,694
Hamilton	117,749	60.8%	58,714	30.3%	17,121	8.8%	59,035	30.5%	193,584
Hancock	25,647	59.9%	8,538	19.9%	8,624	20.1%	17,023	39.8%	42,809
Harrison	14,083	69.7%	4,514	22.3%	1,602	7.9%	9,569	45.4%	20,199
Hendricks	50,697	57.5%	23,179	26.3%	14,246	16.2%	27,518	21.2%	88,122
Henry	12,491	59.3%	4,128	19.6%	4,442	21.1%	8,049	39.7%	21,061
Howard	24,359	60.1%	9,871	24.3%	6,317	15.6%	14,488	35.8%	40,547
Huntington	11,759	66.3%	2,804	15.8%	3,168	17.9%	8,591	48.4%	17,731
Jackson	11,714	61.2%	3,234	16.9%	4,188	21.9%	7,526	49.3%	19,136
Jasper	10,378	67.5%	2,904	18.9%	2,089	13.6%	7,474	48.6%	15,371
Jay	5,227	62.2%	1,240	14.8%	1,938	23.1%	3,289	39.1%	8,405
Jefferson	9,076	62.4%	3,711	25.5%	1,750	12.0%	5,365	36.9%	14,537
Jennings	7,547	62.1%	1,930	15.9%	2,676	22.0%	4,871	40.1%	12,153
Johnson	47,467	61.4%	17,630	22.8%	12,177	15.8%	29,837	38.6%	77,274
Knox	11,210	70.8%	2,809	17.7%	1,821	11.5%	8,401	53.1%	15,840
Kosciusko	23,029	64.6%	5,784	16.2%	6,845	19.2%	16,184	48.4%	35,658
Lagrange	7,520	71.1%	1,690	16.0%	1,365	12.9%	5,830	55.1%	10,575
Lake	94,841	43.7%	112,352	51.7%	10,039	4.6%	-17,511	-8.0%	217,232
LaPorte	26,129	53.7%	18,133	37.3%	4,356	9.0%	7,996	16.4%	48,618
Lawrence	13,371	64.1%	3,616	17.3%	3,881	18.6%	9,490	45.5%	20,868
Madison	29,434	56.8%	14,254	27.5%	8,118	15.7%	15,180	29.3%	51,806
Marion	152,405	39.0%	203,475	52.1%	34,974	8.9%	-51,070	-13.1%	390,854
Marshall	13,145	66.4%	4,025	20.3%	2,634	13.3%	9,120	46.1%	19,804
Martin	3,232	63.1%	709	13.9%	1,177	23.0%	2,055	40.1%	5,118
Miami	9,208	64.1%	2,439	17.0%	2,714	18.9%	6,494	45.2%	14,361
Monroe	24,605	39.4%	33,033	52.8%	4,885	7.8%	-8,428	-13.4%	62,523
Montgomery	10,587	61.6%	2,812	16.4%	3,785	22.0%	6,802	39.6%	17,184
Morgan	22,161	61.6%	5,602	15.6%	8,184	22.8%	13,977	38.8%	35,947
Newton	4,358	66.5%	1,148	17.5%	1,050	16.0%	3,210	49.0%	6,556
Noble	12,498	65.5%	3,237	17.0%	3,353	17.6%	9,145	47.9%	19,088
Ohio	2,210	69.4%	641	20.1%	335	10.5%	1,569	49.3%	3,186
Orange	5,591	63.8%	1,952	22.3%	1,216	13.9%	3,639	41.5%	8,759
Owen	5,857	59.5%	1,852	18.8%	2,137	21.7%	3,720	37.8%	9,846
Parke	4,766	68.4%	1,127	16.2%	1,079	15.5%	3,639	52.2%	6,972
Perry	5,523	63.9%	2,518	29.1%	607	7.0%	3,005	34.8%	8,648
Pike	4,199	68.4%	1,092	17.8%	850	13.8%	3,107	50.6%	6,141
Porter	45,996	53.2%	33,397	38.6%	7,131	8.2%	12,599	14.6%	86,524
Posey	9,648	72.9%	2,773	21.0%	809	6.1%	6,875	51.9%	13,230
Pulaski	3,874	67.2%	1,019	17.7%	875	15.2%	2,855	49.5%	5,768
Putnam	9,375	56.7%	2,876	17.4%	4,269	25.8%	5,106	30.9%	16,520
Randolph	7,399	67.3%	1,863	16.9%	1,732	15.8%	5,536	50.4%	10,994
Ripley	9,518	67.0%	2,231	15.7%	2,458	17.3%	7,060	49.7%	14,207
Rush	4,949	62.8%	1,215	15.4%	1,716	21.8%	3,233	41.0%	7,880
Scott	6,065	60.8%	2,297	23.0%	1,613	16.2%	3,767	37.8%	9,975
Shelby	12,269	61.8%	3,499	17.6%	4,099	20.6%	8,170	41.2%	19,867
Spencer	7,272	68.2%	2,461	23.1%	926	8.7%	4,811	45.1%	10,659
St. Joseph	60,696	52.9%	48,610	42.4%	5,387	4.7%	12,086	10.5%	114,693
Starke	6,730	66.1%	2,026	19.9%	1,427	14.0%	4,704	46.2%	10,183
Steuben	11,407	70.9%	2,939	18.3%	1,739	10.8%	8,468	52.6%	16,085
Sullivan	6,009	67.4%	1,550	17.4%	1,357	15.2%	4,459	50.0%	8,916
Switzerland	2,846	69.8%	822	20.1%	412	10.1%	2,024	49.7%	4,080
Tippecanoe	37,979	53.3%	26,179	36.8%	7,057	9.9%	11,800	16.5%	71,215
Tipton	5,169	64.0%	1,200	14.9%	1,707	21.1%	3,462	42.9%	8,076
Union	2,533	73.2%	603	17.4%	323	9.3%	1,930	55.8%	3,459
Vanderburgh	46,490	60.1%	27,242	35.2%	3,658	4.7%	19,248	24.9%	77,390
Vermillion	4,938	66.9%	1,531	20.7%	917	12.4%	3,407	46.2%	7,386
Vigo	25,917	59.8%	13,999	32.3%	3,419	7.9%	11,918	27.5%	43,335
Wabash	9,111	62.8%	2,421	16.7%	2,979	20.5%	6,132	42.3%	14,511
Warren	3,009	67.5%	672	15.1%	777	17.4%	2,232	50.1%	4,458
Warrick	22,703	67.7%	9,074	27.1%	1,747	5.2%	13,269	40.6%	33,524
Washington	7,919	65.6%	2,408	19.9%	1,746	14.5%	5,511	45.7%	12,073
Wayne	16,914	61.2%	7,534	27.3%	3,172	11.5%	9,380	33.9%	27,620
Wells	9,371	66.7%	1,967	14.0%	2,712	19.3%	6,659	47.4%	14,050
White	7,334	65.8%	1,978	17.8%	1,826	16.4%	5,356	48.0%	11,138
Whitley	11,522	66.0%	2,738	15.7%	3,191	18.3%	8,331	47.7%	17,451

Counties that flipped from Democratic to Republican

- Delaware (largest municipality: Muncie)
- Knox (largest municipality: Vincennes)
- LaPorte (largest municipality: Michigan City)
- Perry (largest municipality: Tell City)
- Porter (largest municipality: Portage)
- St. Joseph (largest municipality: South Bend)
- Sullivan (largest municipality: Sullivan)
- Tippecanoe (largest municipality: Lafayette)
- Vermillion (largest municipality: Clinton)
- Vigo (largest municipality: Terre Haute)

==== By congressional district ====
Holcomb won seven of nine congressional districts.

District	Holcomb	Myers	Rainwater	Representative
1st	47%	48%	6%	Frank J. Mrvan
2nd	59%	31%	10%	Jackie Walorski
3rd	62%	24%	13%	Jim Banks
4th	59%	25%	16%	Jim Baird
5th	56%	34%	10%	Victoria Spartz
6th	63%	22%	15%	Greg Pence
7th	37%	53%	10%	André Carson
8th	65%	25%	10%	Larry Bucshon
9th	58%	30%	12%	Trey Hollingsworth

== Notes ==
Partisan clients
