= Girolamo Bernardino Pallantieri =

Roman Catholic bishop (1533–1619)

Most Reverend Girolamo Bernardino Pallantieri
- Church: Catholic Church
- In office: 1603–1619
- Predecessor: Flaminio Parisio
- Successor: Giovanni Battista Stella

Orders
- Consecration: 12 October 1603 by Girolamo Bernerio

Personal details
- Born: 20 May 1533 Castel Bolognese, Italy
- Died: 23 August 1619 (age 86) Bitonto, Italy

Girolamo Bernardino Pallantieri (20 May 1533 – 23 August 1619) was a Roman Catholic prelate who served as Bishop of Bitonto (1603–1619).

== Biography ==
Girolamo Bernardino Pallantieri was born in a Castel Bolognese, Italy on 20 May 1533 and ordained a friar in the Order of Friars Minor Conventual. On 10 September 1603, he was appointed during the papacy of Pope Gregory XIII as Bishop of Bitonto. On 12 October 1603, he was consecrated bishop by Girolamo Bernerio, Cardinal-Bishop of Albano, with Giulio Santuccio, Bishop of Sant'Agata de' Goti, and Hippolytus Manari, Bishop of Montepeloso, serving as co-consecrators. He served as Bishop of Bitonto until his death on 23 August 1619. While bishop, he was the principal co-consecrator of Vittorio Ragazzoni, Archbishop of Zadar (1604) and Giuseppe Saluzzo, Bishop of Ruvo (1604).

== External links and additional sources ==
- Cheney, David M. "Diocese of Bitonto". Catholic-Hierarchy.org. (for Chronology of Bishops)
- Chow, Gabriel. "Diocese of Bitonto (Italy)". GCatholic.org. (for Chronology of Bishops)

Catholic Church titles
Preceded by Flaminio Parisio	Bishop of Bitonto; 1603–1619	Succeeded by Giovanni Battista Stella
