= Linda Lawson =

Linda Lawson may refer to:

- Linda Lawson (actress) (1936–2022), American actress and singer
- Linda Lawson (politician) (born 1964), American politician
