= Scott Pelath =

American politician

Minority Leader of the Indiana House of Representatives
- In office November 8, 2012 – November 19, 2017
- Preceded by: Linda Lawson
- Succeeded by: Terry Goodin

Member of the Indiana House of Representatives from the 9th district
- In office November 4, 1998 – November 7, 2018
- Preceded by: Thomas J. Alevizos
- Succeeded by: Pat Boy

Personal details
- Born: Scott Douglas Pelath; July 9, 1970 (age 56) Michigan City, Indiana, U.S.
- Party: Democratic
- Education: Indiana University, Bloomington (BS)

Military service
- Allegiance: United States
- Branch/service: United States Army
- Unit: United States Army Reserve

Scott Douglas Pelath (born July 9, 1970) was the Minority Leader of the Indiana House of Representatives. From 1998 to 2018 he represented Indiana's 9th District, which currently covers portions of LaPorte County and Porter County in Northwest Indiana.

Upon his retirement from the Indiana legislature, Pelath became Executive Director of the Kankakee River Basin and Yellow River Basin Development Commission.

== Early life and education ==
Pelath was born and raised in Michigan City, Indiana, to Richard Pelath and Rebecca (née Hoerr) Pelath. After attending Long Beach Elementary and Krueger Junior High, he graduated from Michigan City Elston High School in 1988. He then went on to receive his Bachelor of Science degree in public affairs from Indiana University in 1992.

== Career ==
Prior to coming to the Indiana House, Scott served as an aide to U.S. Rep. Tim Roemer from 1992 to 1997. He also chaired LaPorte County's Democratic Party through the 2000 election, and was a delegate to the Democratic National Convention that year and in 2016.

Pelath served as a first lieutenant in the United States Army Reserve. He is a graduate of the Indiana University ROTC program and the Armor Officer Basic Course at Fort Knox, Kentucky.

From 1999 to 2019, Pelath worked as a human resources director at the Swanson Center in Michigan City. Following his retirement from the Indiana General Assembly, he became Executive Director of the Kankakee River Basin and Yellow River Basin Development Commission. The commission, which serves eight Northwest Indiana counties, seeks to reverse mounting water resource dilemmas related to the draining of the Grand Kankakee Marsh over a century ago.

=== State House ===
Pelath was elected as a Democrat to the State House in 1998 and on November 8, 2012, Representative Pelath was elected Indiana House Democratic Leader. He replaced Linda Lawson.

Pelath formerly held legislative positions of Assistant Minority Leader, Vice-Chairman of the House Ways and Means Committee, and Chairman of the House Rules Committee. On November 19, 2017, Pelath announced that he would resign as Minority Leader and would not run for reelection in 2018. He was replaced by Terry Goodin as Minority Leader.

Among scores of legislative enactments, Pelath was the Indiana House sponsor of the Great Lakes-St. Lawrence River Basin Water Resources Compact, which is now law in eight Great Lakes States and two Canadian provinces. He also coauthored an expansion of the South Shore commuter rail line prior to his legislative retirement.
