= Vincenzo Cisoni =

Bishop of Sant'Agata de' Goti from 1572 to 1583

Most Reverend Vincenzo Cisoni
- Bishop of Sant'Agata de' Goti
- Church: Catholic Church
- Diocese: Diocese of Sant'Agata de' Goti
- In office: 1572–1583
- Predecessor: Felice Peretti Montalto
- Successor: Feliciano Ninguarda

Personal details
- Died: 17 January 1583 Sant'Agata de' Goti, Italy

Vincenzo Cisoni, O.P. (died 1583) was a Roman Catholic prelate who served as Bishop of Sant'Agata de' Goti (1572–1583).

== Biography ==
Vincenzo Cisoni was ordained a priest in the Order of Preachers. On 6 Feb 1572, he was appointed during the papacy of Pope Pius V as Bishop of Sant'Agata de' Goti. He served as Bishop of Sant'Agata de' Goti until his death on 17 Jan 1583.

== External links and additional sources ==
- Cheney, David M. "Diocese of Sant'Agata de' Goti". Catholic-Hierarchy.org. (for Chronology of Bishops) ^{[self-published]}
- Chow, Gabriel. "Diocese of Sant'Agata de' Goti (Italy)". GCatholic.org. (for Chronology of Bishops) ^{[self-published]}

Catholic Church titles
Preceded by Felice Peretti Montalto	Bishop of Sant'Agata de' Goti; 1572–1583	Succeeded by Feliciano Ninguarda
