= Giovanni de Gennaro (bishop) =

Roman Catholic prelate

Most Reverend Giovanni de Gennaro
- Bishop of Sant'Agata de' Goti
- Church: Catholic Church
- Diocese: Diocese of Sant'Agata de' Goti
- In office: 1523–1556
- Predecessor: Giovanni Di Luigi
- Successor: Giovanni Beraldo

Personal details
- Died: 1556 Sant'Agata de' Goti, Italy

Giovanni de Gennaro or Giovanni de Guevara (died 1556) was a Roman Catholic prelate who served as Bishop of Sant'Agata de' Goti (1523–1556).

== Biography ==
On 19 June 1523, Giovanni de Gennaro was appointed during the papacy of Pope Adrian VI as Bishop of Sant'Agata de' Goti. He served as Bishop of Sant'Agata de' Goti until his death in 1556.

== External links and additional sources ==
- Cheney, David M. "Diocese of Sant'Agata de' Goti". Catholic-Hierarchy.org. (for Chronology of Bishops) ^{[self-published]}
- Chow, Gabriel. "Diocese of Sant'Agata de' Goti (Italy)". GCatholic.org. (for Chronology of Bishops) ^{[self-published]}

Catholic Church titles
Preceded by Giovanni Di Luigi	Bishop of Sant'Agata de' Goti; 1523–1556	Succeeded by Giovanni Beraldo
