= Zach Payne =

American politician from Indiana

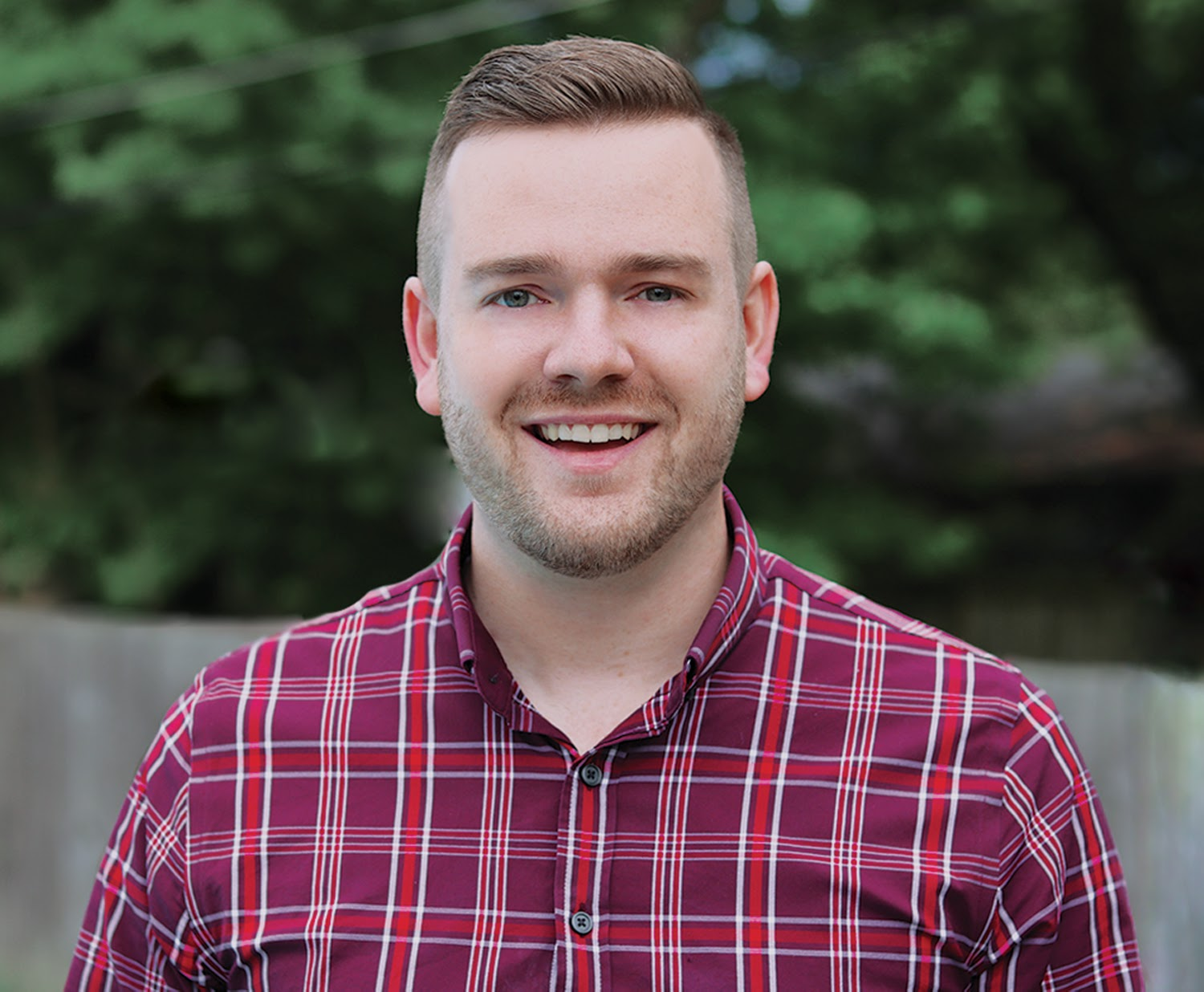

Member of the Indiana House of Representatives from the 66th district
- Incumbent
- Assumed office November 4, 2020
- Preceded by: Terry Goodin

County Recorder of Clark County, Indiana
- In office January 1, 2015 – December 31, 2018
- Succeeded by: Terry Conway

Member of the Jeffersonville, Indiana City Council
- In office January 1, 2012 – December 31, 2014
- Succeeded by: Callie Jahn

Personal details
- Born: Zachary Charles Payne; February 24, 1989 (age 37) Louisville, Kentucky, U.S.
- Party: Republican
- Children: 2
- Education: Charter Oak State College (BS); University of Southern Indiana (MBA); Purdue University (MS); South College (DBA)

Zach Payne (born February 24, 1989) is an American politician and businessman who has served in the Indiana House of Representatives from the 66th district since 2020. Payne previously served as a member of the Jeffersonville, Indiana, city council and as the Clark County, Indiana, county recorder.

== Early life and education ==
Payne was born in Louisville, Kentucky, and later moved to Jeffersonville, Indiana. He attended Jeffersonville High School and graduated from New Albany High School. He earned a Bachelor of Science from Charter Oak State College, an MBA from the University of Southern Indiana, and a Master of Science in Communication from Purdue University

== Political career ==
=== Jeffersonville City Council ===
Payne was elected to the Jeffersonville City Council in 2011 at age 22. He won the general election for District 3 with 42.6% of the vote against Independent Eric Hedrick (30.7%) and Democrat Janice Sinkhorn (26.7%). He served from 2012 to 2014.

=== Clark County Recorder ===
Payne was elected Clark County Recorder in 2014 and served from 2015 to 2018. He was unopposed in the Republican primary.

=== Indiana House of Representatives ===
Payne was elected to the Indiana House of Representatives in 2020, defeating longtime Democratic incumbent Terry Goodin. He was re-elected in 2022 and 2024. As of 2025, he serves as Vice Chair of the Elections and Apportionment Committee, and is a member of the Education, and Employment, Labor, and Pensions Committees.

Payne is considered one of the most conservative legislators in Indiana, receiving high ratings from organizations such as the Freedom Index and Indiana Scorecard. In 2024, he was endorsed by former Congressman Ron Paul and by Congressman Thomas Massie.

He has sponsored and supported legislation on school choice, income tax cuts, gun rights (including constitutional carry and red flag repeal), immigration enforcement, and government accountability.

== Personal life ==
Payne lives in Charlestown, Indiana, with his wife Callie and their two children. He is the founder of a custom print and design business.

== Elections ==
=== 2011 ===
Payne was unopposed in the Republican primary for Jeffersonville City Council District 3. At age 22, he won the general election with 42.6% of the vote. Independent Eric Hedrick received 30.7%, and Democrat Janice Sinkhorn received 26.7%.

=== 2014 ===
Payne was unopposed in the Republican primary for Clark County Recorder. He won the general election with 53.58% of the vote to Democrat Lincoln Crum's 46.42%.

=== 2020 ===
Indiana House District 66 Republican primary, June 2, 2020
Party	Candidate	Votes	%
Republican	Zach Payne	2,866	52.49
Republican	Brian Tibbs	2,594	47.51
Total votes		5,460	100.00

Indiana House District 66 general election, November 3, 2020
Party	Candidate	Votes	%
Republican	Zach Payne	16,585	55.76
Democratic	Terry Goodin (incumbent)	13,160	44.24
Total votes		29,745	100.00

=== 2022 ===
Indiana House District 66 Republican primary, May 3, 2022 (unopposed)
Party	Candidate	Votes	%
Republican	Zach Payne (incumbent)	3,484	100.00
Total votes		3,484	100.00

Indiana House District 66 general election, November 8, 2022
Party	Candidate	Votes	%
Republican	Zach Payne (incumbent)	14,565	69.94
Democratic	Nancy McDevitt	6,260	30.06
Total votes		20,825	100.00

=== 2024 ===
Indiana House District 66 Republican primary, May 7, 2024
Party	Candidate	Votes	%
Republican	Zach Payne (incumbent)	5,224	76.40
Republican	Jim Baker	1,614	23.60
Total votes		6,838	100.00

Indiana House District 66 general election, November 5, 2024
Party	Candidate	Votes	%
Republican	Zach Payne (incumbent)	22,507	69.40
Democratic	Jennifer David	9,926	30.60
Total votes		32,433	100.00

=== 2026 ===
Indiana House District 66 Republican primary, May 5, 2026 (unopposed)
Party	Candidate	Votes	%
Republican	Zach Payne (incumbent)	4,287	100.00
Total votes		4,287	100.00

Indiana House District 66 general election, November 3, 2026 (unofficial results)
Party	Candidate	Votes	%
Republican	Zach Payne (incumbent)	12,615	60.07
Democratic	Ryan Price	8,386	39.93
Total votes		21,001	100.00
