= Terry Goodin =

American politician

Minority Leader of the Indiana House of Representatives
- In office November 27, 2017 – November 7, 2018
- Preceded by: Scott Pelath
- Succeeded by: Phil GiaQuinta

Member of the Indiana House of Representatives from the 66th district
- In office November 8, 2000 – November 4, 2020
- Preceded by: Bill Bailey
- Succeeded by: Zach Payne

Personal details
- Born: Terry Allen Goodin; December 31, 1966 (age 59) Seymour, Indiana, U.S.
- Party: Democratic
- Spouse: Darcie Goodin
- Children: 2
- Education: Eastern Kentucky University (BA, MA); Indiana University, Bloomington (EdD)

Terry Allen Goodin (born December 31, 1966) is an American politician who currently serves as Indiana state director for USDA Rural Development. Goodin was formerly a Democratic member of the Indiana House of Representatives, representing the 66th district from 2000 to 2020. He was the Democratic nominee for lieutenant governor in the 2024 Indiana gubernatorial election.

== Early life and education ==
Goodin was born in Seymour, Indiana. He is a graduate of Austin High School, earned his Bachelor of Arts and Master of Arts degrees from Eastern Kentucky University, and received his Doctor of Education degree from Indiana University.

== Career ==
Goodin was first elected to the Indiana House of Representatives in 2000. Goodin served as the minority leader of the House for a partial term following the resignation of Scott Pelath. He was not re-elected to the position by the Democratic caucus. He also served as superintendent of Crothersville Community Schools and raises beef cattle on his family farm.

In February 2022, President Joe Biden appointed Goodin as the USDA's Indiana state director for rural development.

In June 2024, Goodin was endorsed by the Democratic nominee for governor of Indiana, Jennifer McCormick, to be the Democratic nominee for lieutenant governor.

== Personal life ==
Goodin lives in Austin, Indiana with his wife Darcie; they have two children together. He is Pentecostal.

Indiana House of Representatives
Preceded by Bill Bailey	Member of the Indiana House of Representatives from the 66th district 2000–2020	Succeeded by Zach Payne
Preceded by Scott Pelath	Minority Leader of the Indiana House of Representatives; 2017–2018	Succeeded by Phil GiaQuinta
Party political offices
Preceded by Linda Lawson	Democratic nominee for Lieutenant Governor of Indiana; 2024	Most recent
