= Giulio Santuccio =

Most Reverend Giulio Santuccio
- Bishop of Sant'Agata de' Goti
- Church: Catholic Church
- Diocese: Diocese of Sant'Agata de' Goti
- In office: 1588–1607
- Predecessor: Giovanni Evangelista Pelleo
- Successor: Ettore Diotallevi

Personal details
- Born: 1545
- Died: 25 December 1607 (aged 61–62) Rome, Italy

Giulio Santuccio, O.F.M. Conv. (1545–1607) was a Roman Catholic prelate who served as Bishop of Sant'Agata de' Goti (1588–1607).

== Biography ==
Giulio Santuccio was born in 1545 and ordained a priest in the Order of Friars Minor Conventual. On 11 December 1595, he was appointed during the papacy of Pope Clement VI as Bishop of Sant'Agata de' Goti. He served as Bishop of Sant'Agata de' Goti until his death on 25 December 1607 in Rome.

While bishop, he was the principal co-consecrator of Girolamo Bernardino Pallantieri, Bishop of Bitonto (1603).

== External links and additional sources ==
- Cheney, David M. "Diocese of Sant'Agata de' Goti". Catholic-Hierarchy.org. (for Chronology of Bishops) ^{[self-published]}
- Chow, Gabriel. "Diocese of Sant'Agata de' Goti (Italy)". GCatholic.org. (for Chronology of Bishops) ^{[self-published]}

Catholic Church titles
Preceded by Giovanni Evangelista Pelleo	Bishop of Sant'Agata de' Goti; 1588–1607	Succeeded by Ettore Diotallevi
