= Pietro Paolo Capobianco =

Catholic bishop

Most Reverend Pietro Paolo Capobianco
- Bishop of Sant'Agata de' Goti
- Church: Catholic Church
- Diocese: Diocese of Sant'Agata de' Goti
- In office: 1487–1505
- Successor: Alfonso Carafa (bishop)

Personal details
- Died: 1505 Sant'Agata de' Goti, Italy

Pietro Paolo Capobianco (died 1505) was a Roman Catholic prelate who served as Bishop of Sant'Agata de' Goti (1487–1505).

== Biography ==
On 16 February 1487, Pietro Paolo Capobianco was appointed during the papacy of Pope Innocent VIII as Bishop of Sant'Agata de' Goti. He served as Bishop of Sant'Agata de' Goti until his death in 1505. While bishop, he was the principal co-consecrator of Henri d'Aradon, Auxiliary Bishop of Vannes and Titular Bishop of Citrus (1490).

== External links and additional sources ==
- Cheney, David M. "Diocese of Sant'Agata de' Goti". Catholic-Hierarchy.org. (for Chronology of Bishops) ^{[self-published]}
- Chow, Gabriel. "Diocese of Sant'Agata de' Goti (Italy)". GCatholic.org. (for Chronology of Bishops) ^{[self-published]}

Catholic Church titles
Preceded by	Bishop of Sant'Agata de' Goti; 1487–1505	Succeeded by Alfonso Carafa (bishop)
