= Giovanni Beraldo =

Roman Catholic prelate

Most Reverend Giovanni Beraldo
- Bishop of Sant'Agata de' Goti
- Church: Catholic Church
- Diocese: Diocese of Sant'Agata de' Goti
- In office: 1557–1565
- Predecessor: Giovanni de Gennaro
- Successor: Felice Peretti Montalto
- Previous post: Bishop of Telese o Cerreto Sannita (1548–1557)

Personal details
- Died: 1565

Giovanni Beraldo or Giovanni Beroaldo (died 1565) was a Roman Catholic prelate who served as Bishop of Sant'Agata de' Goti (1557–1565) and Bishop of Telese o Cerreto Sannita (1548–1557).

== Biography ==
On 14 March 1548, Giovanni Beraldo was appointed during the papacy of Pope Paul III as Bishop of Telese o Cerreto Sannita. On 1 October 1557, he was appointed during the papacy of Pope Paul IV as Bishop of Sant'Agata de' Goti. He served as Bishop of Sant'Agata de' Goti until his death in 1565.

While bishop, he was the principal co-consecrator of:

- Antonio Ghislieri, Bishop of Nepi e Sutri (1556); and
- Sigismondo Saraceno, Archbishop of Acerenza e Matera (1556).

== External links and additional sources ==
- Cheney, David M. "Diocese of Cerreto Sannita-Telese-Sant'Agata de' Goti". Catholic-Hierarchy.org. (Chronology of Bishops) ^{[self-published]}
- Chow, Gabriel. "Diocese of Cerreto Sannita-Telese-Sant'Agata de' Goti (Italy)". GCatholic.org. (Chronology of Bishops) ^{[self-published]}
- Cheney, David M. "Diocese of Sant'Agata de' Goti". Catholic-Hierarchy.org. (for Chronology of Bishops) ^{[self-published]}
- Chow, Gabriel. "Diocese of Sant'Agata de' Goti (Italy)". GCatholic.org. (for Chronology of Bishops) ^{[self-published]}

Catholic Church titles
Preceded by Alberico Giaquinta	Bishop of Telese o Cerreto Sannita; 1548–1557	Succeeded by Angelo Massarelli
Preceded by Giovanni de Gennaro (bishop)	Bishop of Sant'Agata de' Goti; 1557–1565	Succeeded by Felice Peretti Montalto
