= Giovanni Evangelista Pelleo =

Most Reverend Giovanni Evangelista Pelleo
- Bishop of Sant'Agata de' Goti
- Church: Catholic Church
- Diocese: Diocese of Sant'Agata de' Goti
- In office: 1588–1595
- Predecessor: Feliciano Ninguarda
- Successor: Giulio Santuccio

Personal details
- Died: 1595 Sant'Agata de' Goti, Italy

Giovanni Evangelista Pelleo, O.F.M. Conv. (died 1595) was a Roman Catholic prelate who served as Bishop of Sant'Agata de' Goti (1588–1595).

== Biography ==
Giovanni Evangelista Pelleo was ordained a priest in the Order of Friars Minor Conventual. On 17 October 1588, he was appointed during the papacy of Pope Sixtus V as Bishop of Sant'Agata de' Goti. He served as Bishop of Sant'Agata de' Goti until his death in 1595.

While bishop, he was the principal co-consecrator of Gaspare Pasquali, Bishop of Ruvo (1589).

== External links and additional sources ==
- Cheney, David M. "Diocese of Sant'Agata de' Goti". Catholic-Hierarchy.org. (for Chronology of Bishops) ^{[self-published]}
- Chow, Gabriel. "Diocese of Sant'Agata de' Goti (Italy)". GCatholic.org. (for Chronology of Bishops) ^{[self-published]}

Catholic Church titles
Preceded by Feliciano Ninguarda	Bishop of Sant'Agata de' Goti; 1588–1595	Succeeded by Giulio Santuccio
