= Giaquinto =

Giaquinto is a surname. Notable people with the surname include:

- Corrado Giaquinto (1703–1765), Italian painter
- Nick Giaquinto (born 1955), American football player
- Tamara Giaquinto (born 2002), Canadian ice hockey player

== See also ==
- Giaquinta
