= Angelo Massarelli =

Italian Roman Catholic bishop

Most Reverend Angelo Massarelli
- Bishop of Telese o Cerreto Sannita
- Church: Roman Catholic
- Diocese: Diocese of Telese o Cerreto Sannita
- In office: 1557–1566
- Predecessor: Giovanni Beraldo
- Successor: Cherubino Lavosio

Personal details
- Born: 1510
- Died: 1566 (aged 55–56)

Angelo Massarelli (1510–1566) was the Roman Catholic Bishop of Telese o Cerreto Sannita (1557–1566). He is best known for keeping the Acts of the Council of Trent, which were the minutes of the council, and published only 300 years after the council was held.

== External links and additional sources ==
- Cheney, David M. "Diocese of Cerreto Sannita-Telese-Sant'Agata de' Goti". Catholic-Hierarchy.org. (Chronology of Bishops) ^{[self-published]}
- Chow, Gabriel. "Diocese of Cerreto Sannita-Telese-Sant'Agata de' Goti". GCatholic.org. (Chronology of Bishops) ^{[self-published]}

Catholic Church titles
Preceded by Giovanni Beraldo	Bishop of Telese o Cerreto Sannita; 1557–1566	Succeeded by Cherubino Lavosio
