= Alfonso Carafa (bishop) =

Roman Catholic prelate

Most Reverend Alfonso Carafa
- Bishop of Lucera
- Church: Catholic Church
- Diocese: Diocese of Lucera
- In office: 1512–1534
- Predecessor: Giovanni Di Luigi
- Successor: Andrea Matteo Palmieri
- Previous posts: Titular Patriarch of Antioch (1504–1505); Bishop of Sant'Agata de' Goti (1505–1512)

Personal details
- Died: 1534

Alfonso Carafa (died 1534) was a Roman Catholic prelate who served as Bishop of Lucera (1512–1534), Bishop of Sant'Agata de' Goti (1505–1512), and Titular Patriarch of Antioch (1504–1505).

== Biography ==
In 1504, he was appointed Titular Patriarch of Antioch by Pope Julius II. On 30 July 1505, he was appointed Bishop of Sant'Agata de' Goti by Pope Julius II. On 27 August 1512, he was appointed Bishop of Lucera by Pope Julius II. He served as Bishop of Lucera until his death in 1505.

== External links and additional sources ==
- Cheney, David M. "Antiochia {Antioch} (Titular See)". Catholic-Hierarchy.org. (for Chronology of Bishops) ^{[self-published]}
- Chow, Gabriel. "Titular Patriarchal See of Antioch (Syria)". GCatholic.org. (for Chronology of Bishops) ^{[self-published]}
- Cheney, David M. "Diocese of Sant'Agata de' Goti". Catholic-Hierarchy.org. (for Chronology of Bishops) ^{[self-published]}
- Chow, Gabriel. "Diocese of Sant'Agata de' Goti (Italy)". GCatholic.org. (for Chronology of Bishops) ^{[self-published]}
- Cheney, David M. "Diocese of Lucera-Troia". Catholic-Hierarchy.org. (for Chronology of Bishops) ^{[self-published]}
- Chow, Gabriel. "Diocese of Lucera-Troi (Italy)". GCatholic.org. (for Chronology of Bishops) ^{[self-published]}

Catholic Church titles
Preceded by Giovanni Michiel	Titular Patriarch of Antioch; 1504–1505	Succeeded by Fernando de Loaces
Preceded by Pietro Paolo Capobianco	Bishop of Sant'Agata de' Goti; 1505–1512	Succeeded by Giovanni Di Luigi
Preceded by Giovanni Di Luigi	Bishop of Lucera; 1512–1534	Succeeded by Andrea Matteo Palmieri
