= Giovanni Di Luigi =

Roman Catholic prelate

Most Reverend Giovanni Di Luigi
- Bishop of Sant'Agata de' Goti
- Church: Catholic Church
- Diocese: Diocese of Sant'Agata de' Goti
- In office: 1512–1519
- Predecessor: Alfonso Carafa (bishop)
- Successor: Giovanni de Gennaro
- Previous posts: Bishop of Lucera (1500–1512); Bishop of Capri (1491–1500)

Giovanni Di Luigi, O. Carm. was a Roman Catholic prelate who served as Bishop of Sant'Agata de' Goti (1512–1519), Bishop of Lucera (1500–1512), and Bishop of Capri (1491–1500).

== Biography ==
Giovanni Di Luigi ordained a priest in the Carmelite Order. On 15 July 1491, he was appointed during the papacy of Pope Innocent VIII as Bishop of Capri. On 25 October 1500, he was appointed during the papacy of Pope Alexander VI as Bishop of Lucera. On 27 August 1512, he was appointed during the papacy of Pope Julius II as Bishop of Sant'Agata de' Goti. He served as Bishop of Sant'Agata de' Goti until his resignation in 1519.

== External links and additional sources ==
- Cheney, David M. "Diocese of Capri". Catholic-Hierarchy.org. (for Chronology of Bishops) ^{[self-published]}
- Chow, Gabriel. "Titular Episcopal See of Capri (Italy)". GCatholic.org. (for Chronology of Bishops) ^{[self-published]}
- Cheney, David M. "Diocese of Lucera-Troia". Catholic-Hierarchy.org. (for Chronology of Bishops) ^{[self-published]}
- Chow, Gabriel. "Diocese of Lucera-Troi (Italy)". GCatholic.org. (for Chronology of Bishops) ^{[self-published]}
- Cheney, David M. "Diocese of Sant'Agata de' Goti". Catholic-Hierarchy.org. (for Chronology of Bishops) ^{[self-published]}
- Chow, Gabriel. "Diocese of Sant'Agata de' Goti (Italy)". GCatholic.org. (for Chronology of Bishops) ^{[self-published]}

Catholic Church titles
Preceded by	Bishop of Capri; 1491–1500	Succeeded by Raffaele Rocca
Preceded by Raffaele Rocca	Bishop of Lucera; 1500–1512	Succeeded by Alfonso Carafa (bishop)
Preceded by Alfonso Carafa (bishop)	Bishop of Sant'Agata de' Goti; 1512–1519	Succeeded by Giovanni de Gennaro (bishop)
