= Woody Myers =

American physician and politician (born 1954)

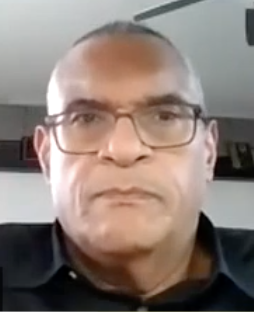
- Myers in 2020

Health Commissioner of New York City
- In office March 30, 1990 – June 11, 1991
- Mayor: David Dinkins
- Preceded by: Stephen C. Joseph
- Succeeded by: Margaret Hamburg

Health Commissioner of Indiana
- In office February 1985 – February 14, 1990
- Governor: Robert D. Orr; Evan Bayh
- Preceded by: Themen Danielson (Acting)
- Succeeded by: Morris Green (Acting)

Personal details
- Born: Woodrow Augustus Myers Jr. February 14, 1954 (age 72) Indianapolis, Indiana, U.S.
- Party: Democratic
- Education: Stanford University (BS, MBA); Harvard University (MD)

Woodrow Augustus Myers Jr. (born February 14, 1954) is an American physician and politician from Indiana. He served as health commissioner for Indiana and New York City. He was the Democratic nominee for governor of Indiana in the 2020 election, losing to incumbent Republican Eric Holcomb.

== Early life and education ==
Myers is from Indianapolis. His father was a landscaper, and his mother was a school principal. Myers graduated from Shortridge High School when he was 16 years old, Stanford University when he was 19, and Harvard Medical School when he was 23. He also attended Stanford's Graduate School of Business and earned a Master of Business Administration.

== Career ==
Myers served as an assistant professor of medicine at the University of California, San Francisco, and quality assurance chairman at San Francisco General Hospital.

=== Health commissioner ===
In 1985, Governor Robert D. Orr selected Myers as Indiana's state health commissioner. When he took the job, he weighed 418 pounds (190 kg) but went on a liquid diet. After one year, he weighed 216 pounds (98 kg). As Indiana's state health commissioner, he supported Ryan White, a teenager with AIDS who had not been permitted to attend school, in his legal challenge against the school board. Myers also supported a law that called for recording the names of those infected with HIV/AIDS and quarantining "recalcitrant carriers" of the disease. In 1987, President Ronald Reagan appointed Myers to the President's Commission on the HIV Epidemic. He resigned later that year amid infighting.

In 1990, Mayor David Dinkins appointed Myers as New York City's health commissioner. He resigned in 1991, in part due to opposition to some of his HIV/AIDS policies. Myers returned to Indianapolis and worked for Wellpoint, Corizon Health, and Blue Cross Blue Shield.

== Politics ==
Myers ran as a Democrat for Indiana's 7th congressional district against incumbent André Carson in the 2008 elections. He was second in the primary election, receiving 24% of the vote, while Carson received 46%. In July 2019, Myers announced his candidacy for the 2020 Indiana gubernatorial election. After his opponents (State Senator Eddie Melton and local business owner Josh Owens) dropped out of the race, he became the only remaining Democrat running for governor in Indiana. He then became the party's official candidate on June 2, 2020. His running mate was Linda Lawson. He ran on a platform of investing in public education, climate change reform, and gun regulations. Myers garnered approximately 32% of the vote, marking the worst performance by a Democratic candidate for governor in Indiana history.

== Personal life ==
Myers is married to his wife, Stacy, and has five children. His son, Zachary A. Myers, is a lawyer and a former United States Attorney for the Southern District of Indiana.

Government offices
Preceded by Themen Danielson; Acting	Health Commissioner of Indiana; 1985–1990	Succeeded by Morris Green; Acting
Preceded by Stephen C. Joseph	Health Commissioner of New York City; 1990–1991	Succeeded by Margaret Hamburg
Party political offices
Preceded by John R. Gregg	Democratic nominee for Governor of Indiana; 2020	Succeeded by Jennifer McCormick
