= Diocese of Sant'Agata de' Goti =

Former Roman Catholic diocese

The Roman Catholic Diocese of Sant'Agata de' Goti was an ecclesial jurisdiction of the Latin Church, part of the larger Catholic Church, located in the Province of Benevento, Campania, southern Italy. It was a suffragan diocese of the Archdiocese of Benevento from its creation in 969. In 1986, it was merged into the Diocese of Cerreto Sannita-Telese-Sant'Agata de' Goti, which continued as a suffragan of the Archdiocese of Benevento.

The bishops of Sant'Agata de' Goti were also barons of Bagnoli, from the 12th century to the 19th. From 1818 to 1854, the bishop of Sant'Agata de' Goti was also Bishop of Acerra.

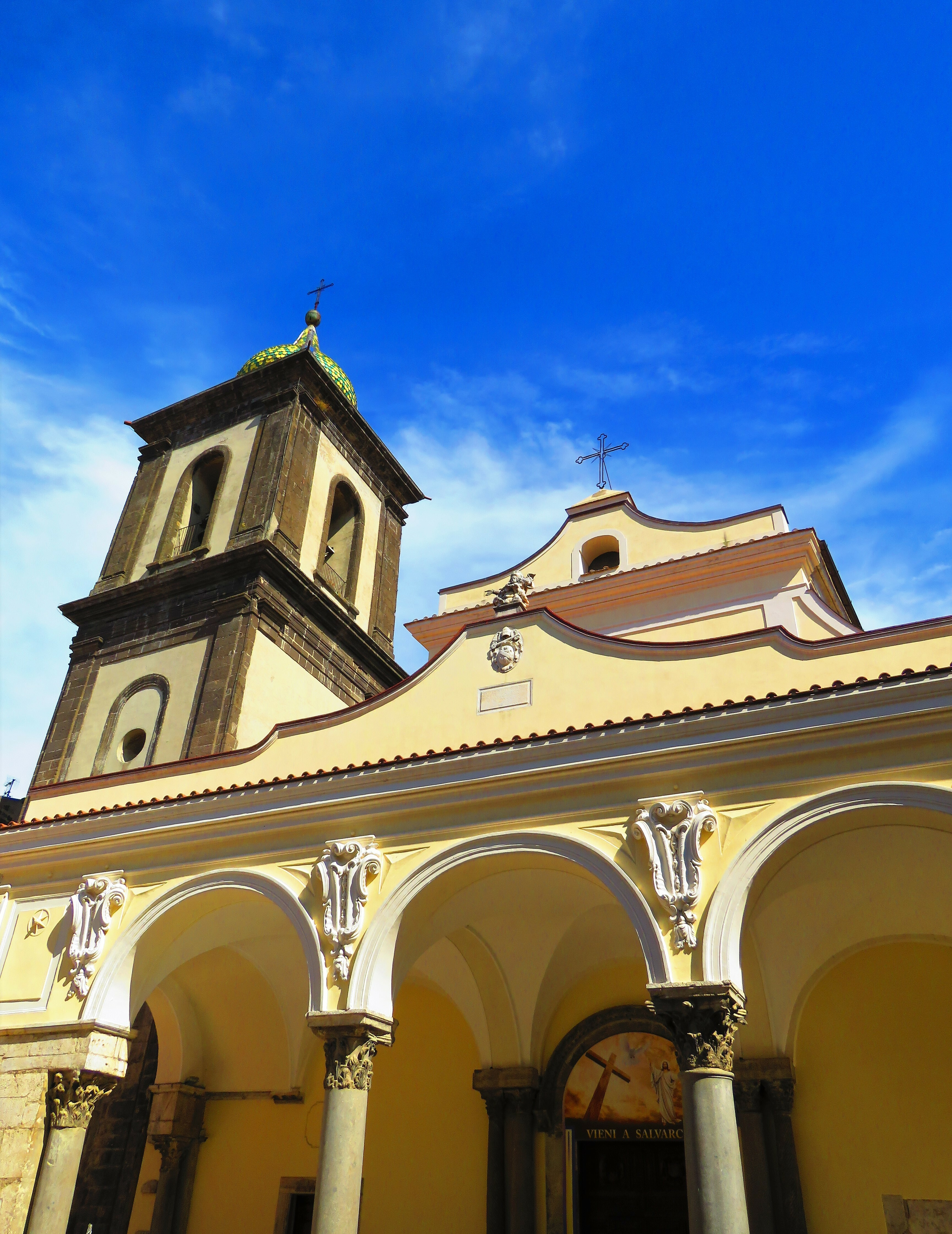
Façade of Cathedral of the Assumption

== History ==
=== Fief ===
The castle of Sant'Agata was held by a Lombard gastaldo, dependent upon the duchy of Benevento, who was promoted to the rank of count by Duke Arechis II of Benevento in 758. In 866, Emperor Louis II captured it from the Byzantines, who had taken it from the Longobard Duchy of Benevento.

The fief of Sant'Agata was held, around the end of the first millennium, by the Lombard prince of Capua, Landolfo. In 1066 it fell into the hands of the Normans. Even at the beginning of the Norman rule, it remained in the hands of a Lombard, Rainulfo II (1181), who was named Count of S. Agata by King William II of Sicily.

When the French conquered the kingdom of Sicily, King Charles I granted the county of S. Agata to the Artus family, which held the fief until Ladislaus d'Artus was killed in 1411 in a rebellion against King Ladislaus of Naples. Subsequently, the fief passed to the Orilia family, then the Della Ratta, the Acquaviva, and the Ram. In the 1500s it became a duchy under the Cossa, and then in 1674 under the Carafa, who held it until the abolition of feudalism in the mid-19th century.

The name Sant'Agata de' Goti of the See is derived by tradition from a body of Goths who took refuge there after the battle of Vesuvius (552); the church of the Goths in Rome, too, was dedicated to St. Agatha. In the diocese, there are also parish churches called Sant'Agata sopra la Porta and Sant'Agata de Marenis.

=== Diocese ===
The consecration of a bishop for Sant'Agata is first mentioned in the papal bull of 970, by which Pope John XIII elevated the diocese of Benevento to the status of Metropolitan Archdiocese of Benevento. The bull authorized the new metropolitan to nominate and consecrate the bishops of the assigned suffragans, including Santa'Agatha. The bull describes precisely the territory of Benevento. In December 970, Archbishop Landulf of Benevento issued a bull in favor of Bishop Madelfridus of Sant'Agata, defining the diocesan limits.

Around 1100, under the patronage of Count Robert, the city began the construction of the monastery of San Menna, a 6th-century hermit, whose remains had been discovered in 1094. The church was personally consecrated by Pope Paschal II on 4 September 1110.

In 1181, Count Rainulf II of S. Agata granted Bishop Urso the local fief of Bagnoli, which brought with it the temporal rank of Baron. The bishops continued to enjoy the title until the abolition of feudalism in the 19th century. By 1714, the castle of Bagnoli was nearly deserted, due to banditry and pestilence.

The city was severely damaged by an earthquake in 1456.

In 1703, there were some sixty priests in the city, and twenty-five clerics. The population was 3,164. In 1885, the city of Sant'Agata claimed a population of 8,014; the entire diocese had 34,812 Catholics. In 1980, just before its suppression, the diocese had a Catholic population of 36,332.

Two diocesan synods were held by Bishop Feliciano Ninguarda, O.P. (1583–1588) in 1585 and in 1586. Bishop Giacomo Circio presided over a diocesan synod in the cathedral of Sant'Agata on 12–14 August 1681. Bishop Filippo Albini (1699–1722) held a diocesan synod in 1706.

=== Chapter and cathedral ===
The cathedral in Sant'Agata de' Goti is dedicated to the Assumption of the Virgin Mary, with the commendation of S. Stephen the Protomartyr and S. Agatha.

The cathedral is administered and served by a corporation called the Chapter. In 1703, the Chapter consisted of thirty members, headed by five dignities (the Archdeacon, the Dean, the Penitentiary, two Primicerii, and the Treasurer). The Treasurer acted as the parish priest of the cathedral parish. There were six other parishes in the city and immediate suburbs. There were two religious houses for men inside the city, one of the Conventual Franciscans, the other of the Brothers of S. John of God, who had a hospital. The abbey of S. Mennas no longer had its own abbot, or even a commendatory abbot, but was under the administration of the Scottish College in Rome; the Rector was obliged to swear obedience to the bishop and accept his visitation.

=== Restoration of 1818 ===
Following the expulsion of the French and the restoration of the Papal States and the Kingdom of the Two Sicilies, a concordat was signed on 16 February 1818, and ratified by Pius VII on 25 February 1818. Ferdinand issued the concordat as a law on 21 March 1818. The right of the king to nominate the candidate for a vacant bishopric was recognized, as in the Concordat of 1741, subject to papal confirmation (preconisation). On 27 June 1818, Pius VII issued the bull De Ulteriore, in which he reestablished the metropolitan archbishopric of Benevento and its suffragans, including Sant'Agata de' Goti. The diocese of Acerra and the diocese of Sant'Agati de' Goti were united under one and the same bishop, aeque personaliter.

On 30 November 1854, following the death of Bishop Francesco Iavarone of Sant'Agata and Acerra (1849–1854), Pope Pius IX reversed the action of Pius VII with regard to the union of those two dioceses aeque personaliter, and separated them again into two distinct and different dioceses, each complete with all the powers of its own bishop and the institutions of its own diocese. Sant'Agata continued as a suffragan of Benevento; Acerra became (again) a suffragan of Naples.

=== Diocesan Reorganization ===
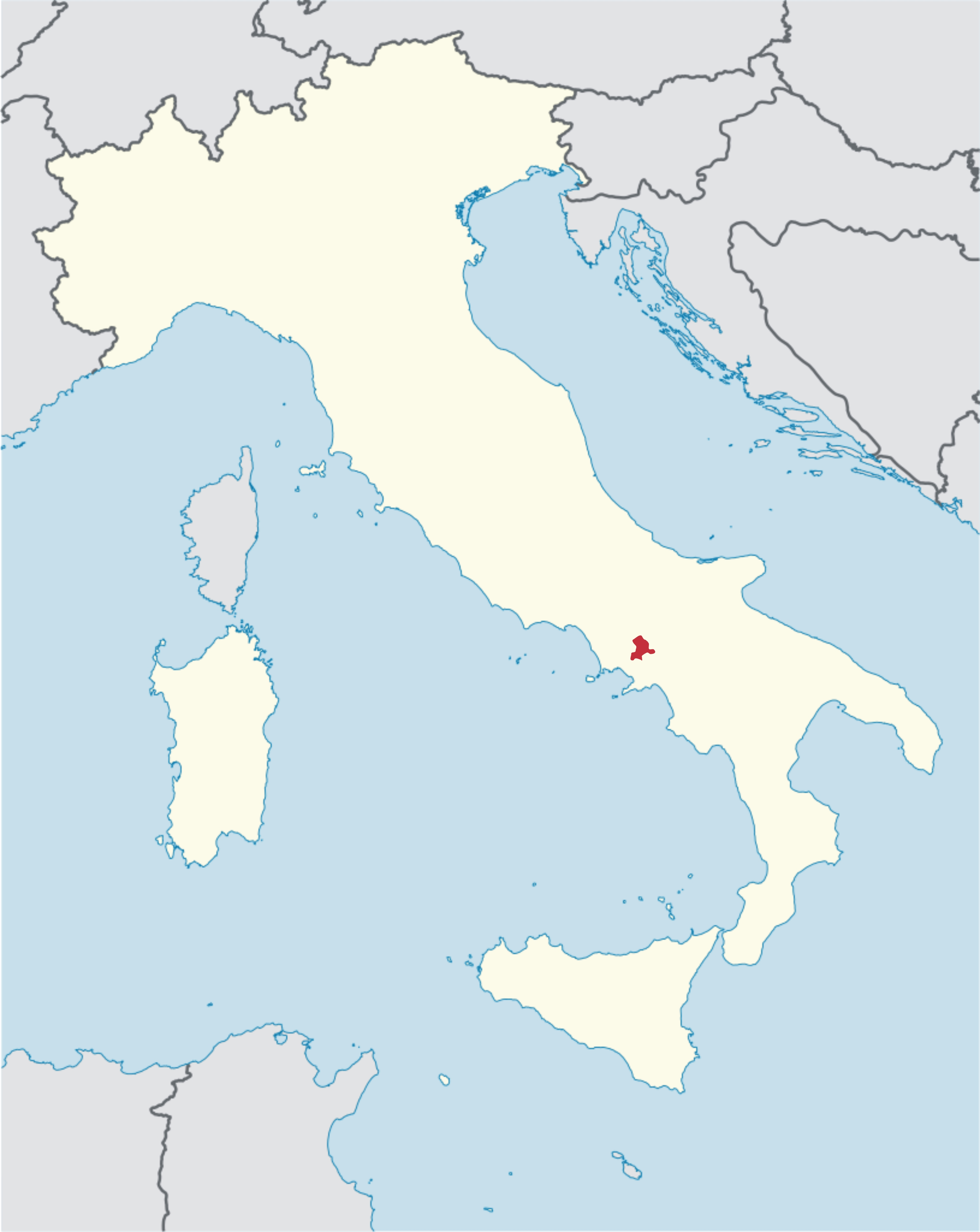
Location of Sant'Agata de' Goti

Following the Second Vatican Council, and in accordance with the norms laid out in the council's decree, Christus Dominus chapter 40, Pope Paul VI ordered a reorganization of the ecclesiastical provinces in southern Italy, beginning with consultations among the members of the Congregation of Bishops in the Vatican Curia, the Italian Bishops Conference, and the various dioceses concerned.

On 18 February 1984, the Vatican and the Italian State signed a new and revised concordat. Based on the revisions, a set of Normae was issued on 15 November 1984, which was accompanied in the next year, on 3 June 1985, by enabling legislation. According to the agreement, the practice of having one bishop govern two separate dioceses at the same time, aeque personaliter, was abolished. The Vatican continued consultations which had begun under Pope John XXIII for the merging of small dioceses, especially those with personnel and financial problems, into one combined diocese.

On 30 September 1986, Pope John Paul II ordered that the dioceses of Diocese of Telese-Cerreto Sannita and S. Agatha Gothorum be merged into one diocese with one bishop, with the Latin title Dioecesis Cerretana-Thelesina-Sanctae Agathae Gothorum. The seat of the diocese was to be in Cerreto, whose cathedral was to serve as the cathedral of the merged diocese. The cathedral in S. Agatha Gothorum was to have the honorary title of "co-cathedral"; the Chapter was to be a Capitulum Concathedralis. There was to be only one diocesan Tribunal, in Molfetta, and likewise one seminary, one College of Consultors, and one Priests' Council. The territory of the new diocese was to include the territory of the suppressed diocese. The new diocese was a suffragan of the archdiocese of Benevento.

== Bishops of Sant'Agata de' Goti ==
Erected: 10th Century
Latin Name: Sanctae Agathae Gothorum

=== to 1500 ===
- Madelfridus (appointed 970)

…

- Adelardus

…

- Bernardus (attested 1059, 1075, 1101)
- Enrico (1108–1143?)
- Andrea (1152?–?)
- Giovanni (John) (? – death 1161)
- Urso (1161 – death 1190)
- Giovanni (1190 – 1213)
- Giovanni (1213–?)
- Giovanni (1234?–?)
- Pietro, O.F.M. (1254–1262?)
- Nicola del Morrone (1262 – death 1282)
- Eustachio, O.P. (17 September 1282 – death 1294?)

Joannes de Castrocoeli (1294–1295) Administrator

- Guido da San Michele, O.F.M. (14 November 1295 – ?)
- Francesco (1304?–?)
- Roberto Ferrari (1318 – 1327)
- Pandolfo (1327 – death 1342)
- Giacomo Martono (4 February 1344 – 23 March 1351)
- Nicola (23 March 1351 – death 1386?)
- Nicola (1386 – 1391) Roman Obedience
- Antonio di Sarno, O.F.M. (19 June 1391 – 1394 deposed) Roman Obedience
- Giacomo Papa (1394 – 1399) Roman Obedience
- Pietro de Gattula (1400 – 1423) Roman Obedience
- Raimondo degli Ugotti, O.S.B.I. (23 July 1423 – 1430)
- Giosuè Mormile (18 December 1430 – 23 July 1436)
- Antonio Bretoni (1437.02.06 – 1440)
- Galeotto de la Ratta (27 April 1442 – death 1455)
- Amorotto (12 September 1455 – death 1468.03)
- Pietro Mattei (1469.04.17 – 1472.06.05)
- Manno Morola (1472 – 1487)
- Pietro Paolo Capobianco (1487–1505 Died)

=== 1500–1818 ===
- Alfonso Carafa (1505–1512)
- Giovanni Di Luigi, O. Carm. (1512–1519 Resigned)
- Giovanni de Gennaro (Guevara) (1523–1556)
- Giovanni Beraldo (1557–1565)
- Felice Peretti Montalto, O.F.M. Conv. (1566–1571)
- Vincenzo Cisoni, O.P. (1572–1583 Died)
- Feliciano Ninguarda, O.P. (1583–1588)
- Giovanni Evangelista Pelleo, O.F.M. Conv. (1588–1595 Died)
- Giulio Santuccio, O.F.M. Conv. (1595–1607)
- Ettore Diotallevi (1608–1635 Appointed, Bishop of Fano)
- Giovanni Agostino Gandolfo (1635–1653 Died)
- Domenico Campanella, O. Carm. (1654–1663 Died)
- Biagio Mazzella, O.P. (1663–1664 Died)
- Giacomo Circio (1664–1699 Died)
- Philippus Albini (1699–1722)
- Muzio Gaeta (iuniore) (1723–1735)
- Flaminio Danza (1735–1762)
- Alfonso Maria de Liguori (1762–1775)
- Onofrio Rossi (1775–1784)
- Paolo Pozzuoli (1784–1799)

Sede vacante (1799–1818)

== Bishops of Sant'Agata de' Goti e Acerra ==
- Orazio Magliola (1818–1829 Died)
- Emanuele Maria Bellorado, O.P. (1829–1833 Died)
- Taddeo Garzilli (Garzillo) (1834–1848 Died)
- Francesco Iavarone (1849–1854 Died)

== Bishops of Sant'Agata de' Goti ==
=== 1855–1986 ===
- Francesco Paolo Lettieri (1855–1869 Died)
- Domenico Ramaschiello (1871–1899)
- Ferdinando Maria Cieri (1899–1910 Died)
- Alessio Ascalesi, C.Pp.S. (1911–1915)
- Giuseppe de Nardis (1916–1953 Retired)
- Costantino Caminada (1953–1960 Appointed, Titular Bishop of Thespiae)
- Ilario Roatta (1960–1982 Retired)
- Felice Leonardo (1984–1986)

30 September 1986: United with the Diocese of Telese o Cerreto Sannita to form the Diocese of Cerreto Sannita-Telese-Sant'Agata de' Goti

== See also ==
- Roman Catholic Diocese of Acerra
- List of Catholic dioceses in Italy

== Bibliography ==
=== Episcopal lists ===
- Eubel, Conradus, ed. (1913). Hierarchia catholica (in Latin). Vol. I (second ed.). Münster: Libreria Regensbergiana.
- Eubel, Conradus, ed. (1914). Hierarchia catholica (in Latin). Vol. II (second ed.). Münster: Libreria Regensbergiana.
- Eubel, Conradus; Gulik, Guilelmus (1923). Hierarchia catholica (in Latin). Vol. III (second ed.). Münster: Libreria Regensbergiana.
- Gams, Pius Bonifatius (1873). Series episcoporum Ecclesiae catholicae: quotquot innotuerunt a beato Petro apostolo (in Latin). Ratisbon: Typis et Sumptibus Georgii Josephi Manz. pp. 845–846.
- Gauchat, Patritius (Patrice) (1935). Hierarchia catholica (in Latin). Vol. IV (1592-1667). Münster: Libraria Regensbergiana.
- Ritzler, Remigius; Sefrin, Pirminus (1952). Hierarchia catholica medii et recentis aevi (in Latin). Vol. V (1667-1730). Patavii: Messagero di S. Antonio.
- Ritzler, Remigius; Sefrin, Pirminus (1958). Hierarchia catholica medii et recentis aevi (in Latin). Vol. VI (1730-1799). Patavii: Messagero di S. Antonio.
- Ritzler, Remigius; Sefrin, Pirminus (1968). Hierarchia Catholica medii et recentioris aevi (in Latin). Vol. VII (1800–1846). Monasterii: Libreria Regensburgiana.
- Remigius Ritzler; Pirminus Sefrin (1978). Hierarchia catholica Medii et recentioris aevi (in Latin). Vol. VIII (1846–1903). Il Messaggero di S. Antonio.
- Pięta, Zenon (2002). Hierarchia catholica medii et recentioris aevi (in Latin). Vol. IX (1903–1922). Padua: Messagero di San Antonio. ISBN 978-88-250-1000-8.

=== Studies ===
- Cappelletti, Giuseppe (1864). Le chiese d'Italia: dalla loro origine sino ai nostri giorni (in Italian). Vol. Tomo decimonono (19). Venice: G. Antonelli. pp. 341–349.
- Carrelli, G. (1923), "I conti Normanni di S. Agata dei Goti," (in Italian), in: Rivista dell Collegio Araldico Vol. 21 (Roma 1923), pp. 221–225.
- D'Avino, Vincenzo (1848). Cenni storici sulle chiese arcivescovili, vescovili, e prelatizie (nulluis) del Regno delle Due Sicilie (in Italian). Napoli: Ranucci. pp. 606–612.
- Kamp, Norbert (1973). Kirche und Monarchie im staufischen Königreich Sizilien. Prosopographische Grundlegung. Bistümer und Bischöfe des Königreichs 1194-1266. 1. Abruzzen und Kampanien. (in German) Munich 1973, pp. 286–290
- Kehr, Paulus Fridolin (1962). Italia pontificia. Regesta pontificum Romanorum. Vol. IX: Samnia – Apulia – Lucania. (in Latin). Berlin: Weidmann. (in Latin). pp. 120–124.
- Klewitz, Hans-Walter (1933). "Zur geschichte der bistumsorganisation Campaniens und Apuliens im 10. und 11. Jahrhundert", (in German), in: Quellen und Forschungen aus italienischen archiven und bibliotheken, XXIV (1932–33), p. 44.
- Orlandi, Giuseppe (1969). "Le relazioni «ad limina» della diocesi di Sant'Agata de' Goti nel secolo XVIII," (in Italian) in: Spicilegium Historicum 17 (1969), parts I pp. 3–82; & II pp. 189–214.
- Ughelli, Ferdinando; Coleti, Niccolo (1721). Italia sacra, sive De episcopis Italiae et insularum adjacentium (in Latin). Vol. Tomus octavus (8). Venice: Apud Sebastianum Coleti. pp. 344–358.
- [Viparelli, F.] (1841). Memorie istoriche della citta di S. Agata dei Goti. (in Italian). (Naples: M. Avallone 1841).

=== External links ===
- Gabriel Chow, GCatholic, "GCatholic, with Google satellite photo"
