= Phil GiaQuinta =

American politician from Indiana

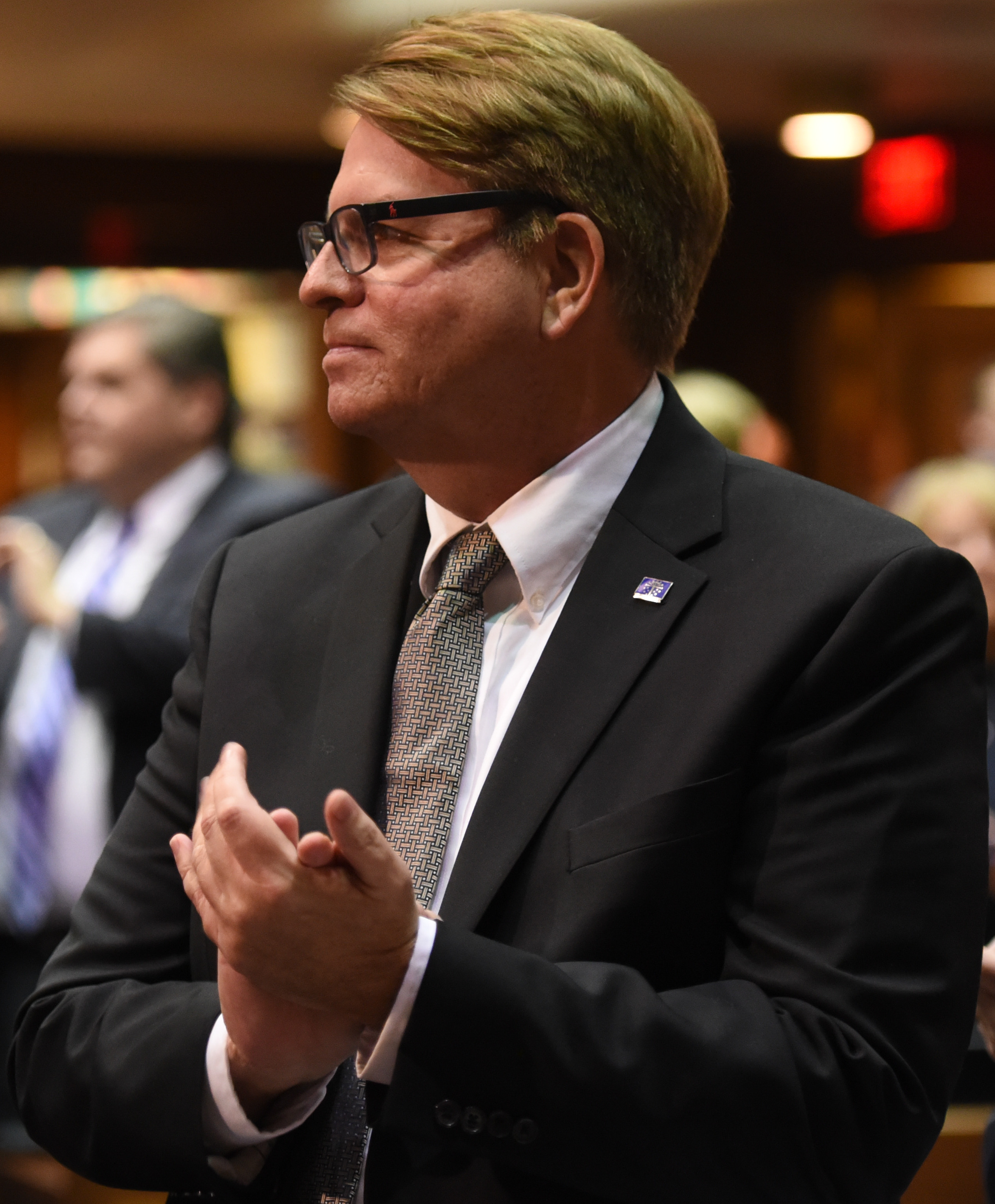

Minority Leader of the Indiana House of Representatives
- Incumbent
- Assumed office November 7, 2018
- Preceded by: Terry Goodin

Member of the Indiana House of Representatives from the 80th district
- Incumbent
- Assumed office November 8, 2006
- Preceded by: Ben GiaQuinta

Personal details
- Born: September 2, 1964 (age 61) Fort Wayne, Indiana, U.S.
- Party: Democratic
- Education: Indiana University, Bloomington (BA)

Phil GiaQuinta (born September 2, 1964) is a Democratic member of the Indiana House of Representatives, representing the House District 80, which contains much of southern Fort Wayne, since November 8, 2006. He currently serves as House Minority Leader for the Democratic caucus of the Indiana House.

== Career ==
In 2006, GiaQuinta was elected to be the state representative for House District 80, succeeding his father, Ben. He was elected to be the leader of the Indiana House Democratic Caucus on Nov. 7, 2018. In his personal career capacity, he serves as a customer account manager for Fort Wayne City Utilities.

In 2024, GiaQuinta announced his intent to run for Fort Wayne Mayor, following the death of incumbent mayor Tom Henry. On April 20, 2024, GiaQuinta lost the Democratic Caucus to Fort Wayne Councilwoman Sharon Tucker.

== Personal life ==
Giaquinta was born on September 2, 1964, in Fort Wayne. He graduated from Indiana University. He is the son of former State Rep. Ben GiaQuinta. He is the youngest of six children and is uncle to 16 nieces and nephews.

Indiana House of Representatives
Preceded by Terry Goodin	Minority Leader of the Indiana House of Representatives; 2018–present	Incumbent
