= Linda Lawson (politician) =

American politician

Minority Leader of the Indiana House of Representatives
- In office July 26, 2012 – November 8, 2012
- Preceded by: B. Patrick Bauer
- Succeeded by: Scott Pelath

Member of the Indiana House of Representatives from the 1st district
- In office November 4, 1998 – November 7, 2018
- Preceded by: Ron Tabaczynski
- Succeeded by: Carolyn Jackson

Personal details
- Born: June 29, 1964 (age 62) Hammond, Indiana, U.S.
- Party: Democratic
- Spouse: Jim Hornak
- Education: Indiana University Northwest

Linda C. Lawson (born June 29, 1964) is an American politician and law enforcement officer who served as a member of the Indiana House of Representatives from 1998 until her retirement in 2018.

== Career ==
Lawson is a 24-year veteran of the Hammond Police Department. She became the first female captain to serve the department after working as a patrol officer and a member of the sex crimes and domestic violence divisions.

Lawson was chosen by Indiana House Democrats as their minority leader in a caucus on July 26, 2012. She became the first woman to head a Caucus in the Indiana House of Representatives. She was the minority leader until House Democrats met to choose new leadership following the November general election, selecting Scott Pelath.

In 2018, Lawson announced that she would not be running for reelection to the State House.

On May 8, 2020, Lawson was tapped as the running mate for Woody Myers in the 2020 Indiana gubernatorial election.

Indiana House of Representatives
Preceded by Ron Tabaczynski	Member of the Indiana House of Representatives from the 1st district 1998–2018	Succeeded by Carolyn Jackson
Preceded by B. Patrick Bauer	Minority Leader of the Indiana House of Representatives; 2012	Succeeded by Scott Pelath
Party political offices
Preceded by Christina Hale	Democratic nominee for Lieutenant Governor of Indiana; 2020	Succeeded by Terry Goodin
