= Alberico Giaquinta =

Roman Catholic prelate

Most Reverend Alberico Giaquinta
- Bishop of Telese o Cerreto Sannita
- Church: Catholic Church
- Diocese: Diocese of Telese o Cerreto Sannita
- In office: 1540–1548
- Predecessor: Sebastiano de Bonfilii
- Successor: Giovanni Beraldo

Personal details
- Died: 1548 Italy

Alberico Giaquinta or Alberico Jacquinti or Alberico Giaquinto (died 1548) was a Roman Catholic prelate who served as Bishop of Telese o Cerreto Sannita (1540–1548).

== Biography ==
On 30 April 1540, Alberico Giaquinta was appointed during the papacy of Pope Paul III as Bishop of Telese o Cerreto Sannita. He served as Bishop of Telese o Cerreto Sannita until his death in 1548.

== External links and additional sources ==
- Cheney, David M. "Diocese of Cerreto Sannita-Telese-Sant'Agata de' Goti". Catholic-Hierarchy.org. (Chronology of Bishops) ^{[self-published]}
- Chow, Gabriel. "Diocese of Cerreto Sannita-Telese-Sant'Agata de' Goti". GCatholic.org. (Chronology of Bishops) ^{[self-published]}

Catholic Church titles
Preceded by Sebastiano de Bonfilii	Bishop of Telese o Cerreto Sannita; 1540–1548	Succeeded by Giovanni Beraldo
