= 2018 in comics =

Notable events of 2018 in comics. It includes any relevant comics-related events, deaths of notable comics-related people, conventions and first issues by title.

== Events ==
=== February ===
- February 3: The final episode of Bud Grace's Piranha Club is published.
- February 13: A legal declaration on behalf of Stan Lee's attorney Tom Lallas accuses Lee's daughter, Joan Celia Lee, and attorneys Jerry Olivarez, Keya Morgan and Kirk Schenck of "continuing attempts to control Lee's life and exercise undue influence over his property, assets and business affairs." In April, Lee is, however, filmed denying the accusations, yet confirming that he signed the statement, despite not being able to properly read it due to macular degeneration.
- February 16: Stan Lee's tour manager, Max Anderson, is removed by the police for aggressive behaviour towards Lee. The report is filed by Keya Morgan and denied by Anderson.
- February 18: Guy Gilchrist quits drawing Nancy after continuing the series for 22 years.
- Anne Guillard's comic book On A Chopé la Puberté (We Caught Puberty) in her Les Pipelettes series causes controversy on the accusation that it is sexist and confirms stereotypes about underage teen girls being lust objects, as well as being hebophilic. A petition is signed to remove it from shops. The publishing company agrees to not reprint it. Guillard writes an open letter the next month, effectively terminating her series there and then.

=== March ===
- March 18: During an episode of Last Week Tonight with John Oliver John Oliver presents the book A Day in the Life of Marlon Bundo by Jill Twiss, illustrated by Gerald Kelley under the pseudonym E.G. Keller, a parody of Charlotte Pence's Marlon Bundo's: A Day in the Life of the Vice President, illustrated by Karen Pence. Both books are about U.S. Vice President Mike Pence's pet rabbit Marlon Bundo, but the one presented during Oliver's show has an LGBT themed story and is a satire on Mike Pence's controversial homophobic policies.
- March 31- April 1: During the Stripdagen in Utrecht Peter van Dongen wins the Stripschapprijs. Comics journalists Rob van Eijck, Willem van Helden and Joost Pollmann win the P. Hans Frankfurtherprijs. Peter Middeldorp receives the Bulletje en Boonestaakschaal.

=== April ===
- April 4: IDW Publishing releases the 1st issue of Sonic the Hedgehog reboot comic series. Following a legal disput, the reboot will have no connection with the previous continuity.
- April 9: Olivia Jaimes continues Nancy.
- April 13: Stan Lee files a lawsuit against his former manager Jerardo Olivarez, alleging fraud, financial abuse of an elder and misappropriation of his name and likeness.
- April 18: Action Comics #1000 released.
- April 26: Dutch comic artist Eric Heuvel is knighted in the Order of the Netherlands Lion.

=== May ===
- May 15: Stan Lee sues POW! Entertainment for "manufacturing a fraudulent intellectual property agreement, which granted POW! the exclusive right to use Lee's name, identity, image and likeness on a worldwide basis in perpetuity".
- May 24: Dutch comics salesman, publisher and collector Hans Matla is knighted as Ridder in de Orde van Oranje-Nassau.

=== June ===
- June 13: Stan Lee's former business manager Keya Morgan is arrested for filing a false report of an emergency and two counts of filing a false report of a crime, along with a probation violation. Two days later a restraining order is filed against him too. He denies the accusations.
- June 19: In the Central Station of Brussels a ceiling fresco depicting The Smurfs is inaugurated.
- June 25: The heirs of Belgian comic artist Pom win their case against publisher 't Mannekesblad over breach of contract, regarding the reprints of his signature series Piet Pienter en Bert Bibber. Standaard Uitgeverij will now reprint the series instead.
- June 26: Bill Morrison becomes executive editor of Mad.

=== August ===
- August 6: In Ghent, Belgium, cartoonist Mauro Padovani and his husband Thomas become victim of gay bashing. They have to be brought to a hospital. The culprits are later arrested.
- August 10: In an interview Stan Lee confirms that he made some bad decisions regarding his financial matters, but denies any bad relations with his daughter.
- August 29: In the British comic magazine The Beano the character Gnasher is announced to have disappeared, but in the next issue, printed on 5 September, it turns out to have been a publicity stunt for the animal welfare society Battersea Dogs & Cats Home.
- August 30: Mercy-Man debuts as Tajikistan's first superhero.

=== September ===
- September 24: Comic characters Suske en Wiske receive a statue in Middelkerke, Belgium.
- September 25: Dutch cartoonist Tjeerd Royaards wins the Inktspotprijs for Best Political Cartoon.
- September 28: French comics artist Bastien Vivès causes controversy with the graphic novel Petit Paul, about a ten-year-old boy who is stalked for his huge penis by adult women. A petition is signed to ban the book, which some stores effectively do.

=== October ===
- October 19: The final episode of Paige Braddock's Jane's World is published.

=== Specific date unknown ===
- Rama Duwaji releases her graphic novel Razor Burn.

== Deaths ==
=== January ===
- January 8: Ron Tandberg, Australian cartoonist and comics artist (Fred and Others), dies at age 74.
- January 18: Mark Campos, American alternative comics artist (Places That Are Gone), commits suicide at age 55.
- January 18: Chandi Lahiri, Indian cartoonist, dies at age 86.
- January 20: Bob Wakelin, British album cover & video game cover designer and comic artist (worked for Marvel Comics), dies at age 65 or 66.
- January 24:
  - Marc Ratal, Belgian comics artist (Puck Reporter), dies at age 75.
  - Jan Steeman, Dutch comics artist (Roel Dijkstra, Noortje), dies at age 74.
- January 25: Torvald Sundbaum, Swedish comics artist (continued Buster Perk, worked for the Swedish edition of Mad Magazine, made a comics version of the radio series Osynliga Klubben), dies at age 89.
- January 27: Mort Walker, American comics writer/creator (Hi and Lois, Beetle Bailey, Sam's Strip, Mrs. Fits' Flats, The Evermores, Gamin and Patches) and artist (Beetle Bailey, Boner's Ark), dies at age 94.
- January 28: Cav Bøgelund, Danish animator and comics artist (Sorte), drowns at age 39 in mysterious circumstances.

=== February ===
- February 1: Pat Tourret, British comic artist (Tiffany Jones), dies at age 88 or 89.
- February 2: Servais Tiago, Portuguese comics artist and animator, dies at age 92.
- February 22: Forges, Spanish film director, television director and cartoonist (Blasillo, La Foca Concha and Romerales), dies at age 76 from pancreatic cancer.
- February 25: Howard Sparber, American painter, sculptor and comics artist (Timmmy, Crax and Jax, The Byrd House, Trix of the Trade), dies at age 97.
- February 27:
  - William Gezzio, Uruguayan comics artist (Charoná, Campito, Humornautas), dies at age 73.
  - Bill Lignante, American comics artist, courtroom sketch artist and animator (continued The Phantom), dies at age 91.

=== March ===
- March 1: Hans Räde, German graphic artist, painter and comics artist (Colli's wundersame Reise), dies at age 96.
- March 15: Robert Grossman, American painter, caricaturist, sculptor, filmmaker, poster designer, comics artist, cartoonist and animator (Zoonooz, Twump & Pooty, political-satirical comics for The New Yorker), dies at age 78.
- March 19: Murray Karn, Canadian comics artist (Thunderfist, Jeff Waring), dies at age 92 or 93.
- March 25: Fred Boatman, American cartoonist and graphic artist (made cartoons for CARtoons), dies at age 83.
- March 26: Lee Holley, American comics artist (Ponytail, assisted on Dennis the Menace and Looney Tunes comics), dies at age 84 in an airplane crash.
- March 27: Carlos Cruz González, Spanish comics artist (Colt Miller, Indio Suarez, Santos Palma, Mighty McGinty, Moonie's Magic Mate, The Pillater Peril, Juanjo, Kelly, continued Sergeant Kirk, Dan Dare and El Hombre Enmascarado), dies at age 87.
- Specific date unknown: Gérald Gorridge, French comics artist (Histoire Sans Titre, Olycka, La Dame de Lettonie, Les Tristes Conséquences d'un Échec du Sire de Bougainville), dies at age 60.

=== April ===
- April 8: Gunnar Persson, Swedish comics artist (Gus, continued Kronblom, created the spin-off Ur Klackamo Dagbok), dies at age 85 after injuries from a fall.
- April 9: Phil Collins, Canadian comics artist (Leonardo), dies at age 86.
- April 10: F'murr, French comics artist (Le Génie des alpages), dies at age 72.
- April 18: Pino Rinaldi, Italian comics artist (continued Martin Mystère and worked for Marvel Comics), dies from pancreatic cancer at age 60.

=== May ===
- May 7: Miki Muster, Slovenian sculptor, illustrator, comics artist and animator (Zvitorepec, Trdonja, Lakotnik), dies at age 92.
- May 14: William Vance, Belgian comics artist (Bruno Brazil, Bob Morane, XIII), dies at age 82 from Parkinson's disease.
- May 18:
  - Antonio Lupatelli aka Tony Wolf, Oda Taro, L'Alpino and Antony Moore, Italian illustrator, writer and comics artist (Ciccio Sprai, Robi e Robo, continued Hayawatha, Freddie Frog, Fun in Toyland, Little Sooty, Moony Moon, illustrated The Woodland Folk book series and the Pingu, Pandi and Teddy the Bear book adaptations), dies at age 88.
  - Fred Peters, American animator and comics artist (EC Comics), dies at age 95.
- May 27: Julio Ribera, aka Jules McSide, aka Bop, Spanish comics artist (Le Vagabond des Limbes (The Vagabond of Limbo), Le Grand Manque, Le Grand Scandale, Dracurella, Montserrat), dies at age 91.

=== June ===
- June 2: Nick Meglin, American comics writer, theatre lyricist, screenwriter and editor-in-chief (Mad Magazine, Superfan), dies from a heart attack at age 82.
- June 11: Rumen Petkov, Bulgarian animator and comics artist (Choko & Boko), dies at age 70.
- June 28: Harlan Ellison, American novelist; screenwriter and comics writer (EC Comics), dies at age 82.
- June 29: Steve Ditko, American comic book artist and writer (Marvel Comics, DC Comics), dies at age 90.

=== July ===
- July 3: Takahiro Satō, Japanese manga artist (Satō's Samejima, Saigo no Jūgonichi), dies at age 41.
- July 5: Pepe Ferré, Spanish comics artist (Comicon S.L., Disney comics, Rolf Kauka comics, Egmont-Ehapa), dies at age 69.
- July 13: Frank Giroud, French comics writer (Louis la Guigne, Louis Ferchot, Mandrill, the Décalogue trilogy.), dies at age 62.
- July 19: Claude Viseur, A.K.A. Clovis, Belgian animator and comics artist (worked on Michel Vaillant), dies at age 72.
- July 20:
  - Jeff Hook, Australian cartoonist (Jeff's View), dies at age 89.
  - Carlos Vogt, Argentine animator and comic artist (Pepe Sánchez, Mojado), dies at age 85.
- July 26: Luigi Corteggi, aka Cortez, Italian art director, painter, illustrator and comics artist (created covers for Sergio Bonelli comics, continued Ken Parker, Mister No, Martin Mystère, Alan Ford and Dylan Dog), dies at age 85.

=== August ===
- August 5: John Blair Moore, American cartoonist and comics artist (Invaders From Home, Disney comics, Live Bait - The Chronicles of Drumf), dies at age 69 or 70.
- August 21: Vincino, Italian cartoonist and journalist, dies at age 73.
- August 23: Russ Heath, American comic book artist and animator (Men of War, G.I. Combat, assisted on Terry and the Pirates, Flash Gordon, Little Annie Fanny), dies at age 91 from cancer.
- August 27: Marten Bierman, Dutch politician, engineer and comics artist (Loek Spandoek) dies at age 78.
- August 30: Gary Friedrich, American comics writer (Sgt. Fury and his Howling Commandos, The Monster of Frankenstein, co-creator of Ghost Rider and Son of Satan), dies at age 75.
- August 30: Marie Severin, American comics artist and colorist (EC Comics, Not Brand Echh, co-creator of the visual look of Spider-Woman), dies at age 89.

=== September ===
- September 6: Edouard Aidans, aka Jok, Joke, Delcroix and Hardan, Belgian comics artist (Bob Binn, Tounga, Marc Franval, Les Panthères, La Toile et la Dague, Tony Stark, continued Bernard Prince, Les Saintes Nitouches), dies at age 88.
- September 7:
  - Szarlota Pawel, Polish comic artist (Jonka, Jonek i Kleks, Kubus Piekielny), dies at age 70.
  - Carlos Ceesepe, Spanish painter, illustrator and comics artist, dies at age 60 from leukemia.
- September 24: Norm Breyfogle, 58, American comic book artist (Batman, Prime), complications from a stroke.
- September 24: Bert Cornelius, Dutch comics artist (Mussengang), dies at age 66.
- September 30: René Pétillon, French political cartoonist and comics artist (Jack Palmer, Docteur Miracle, Le Baron Noir), dies at age 72.
- September 30: Carlos Ezquerra, Spanish comics artist (Judge Dredd), dies at age 70.

=== October ===
- October 2: Hermenegildo Sábat, Uruguayan-Argentine comics artist, journalist, jazz musician and caricaturist, dies at age 85.
- October 3: Raquel Orzuj, Uruguayan editorial cartoonist, painter, journalist and comic artist, dies at age 79.
- October 7: Gibba, Italian animator and comics artist, dies at age 93.
- October 13: Nesten, Belgian caricaturist and painter, dies at age 71 from cancer.
- October 17:
  - Leone Frollo, Italian comics artist (Biancaneve), dies at age 87.
  - Jean-Pierre Girerd, Canadian political cartoonist (made the comic strip On à Volé La Coupe Stanley), dies at age 87.
- October 18: Anthea Bell, British translator (co-translator of Astérix, Blueberry (comics), Iznogoud, Le Petit Nicolas), dies at age 82.
- October 22: Jacques Tabary, French comic artist (Monsieur Magie, assisted on Totoche, Corinne et Jeannot), dies at age 92.
- October 23: Roberto Renzi, Italian comics artist (Tiramolla, Akim), dies at age 95.
- October 31: Enzo Apicella, Italian cartoonist, dies at age 95.

=== November ===
- November 7: John Allard, British comics writer (scripted The Perishers) and artist (Scorer, continued Garth and Jane), dies at age 89 or 90.
- November 11: Jack Tremblay, Canadian comics artist (Crash Carson), dies at age 92.
- November 12: Stan Lee, American comic book writer (Marvel Comics), dies at age 95.
- November 15: Mike Noble, British comics artist (The Twins Simon and Sally, worked on comics based on TV series, among them Fireball XL5), dies at age 88.
- November 15: Werner Wejp-Olsen, Danish-American comics artist (Peter og Perle, Felix, Inspector Danger's Crime Quiz, Granny and Slowpoke, The Tales of Hans Christian Andersen), dies at age 80.
- November 19: Larry Pickering, Australian cartoonist and caricaturist, dies at age 76.
- November 26: Stephen Hillenburg, American comics artist and animator (The Intertidal Zone, SpongeBob SquarePants), dies at age 57.

=== December ===
- December 13: Jean-Pierre Van Rossem, Belgian economist, politician, criminal and comics writer (wrote the script for his own celebrity comics series Van Rossem, drawn by Erik Meynen), dies at age 73.
- December 17: José Clémen, Argentine comic artist and illustrator, dies at age 89 or 90.
- December 20: F. W. Bernstein, German poet and cartoonist, dies at age 80.
- December 24: Grazia Nidasio, Italian comics artist (Valentina Mela Verde, Steffi), dies at age 87.
- December 27: Børge Ring, Danish animator, jazz musician and comics artist (Distel, Kobus en Kachelmans, Fleurtje, worked on Pelle Svanslös and Disney comics), dies at age 97.
- December 28: Paul Wheelahan, Australian comics artist (The Panther, Rex Strong, The Raven), dies at age 88. .

== Exhibitions ==
- November 17–December 15: "The Masters Series: Roz Chast", SVA Chelsea Gallery, New York City

== Conventions ==
- March 24: FLUKE Mini-Comics & Zine Festival (40 Watt, Athens, Georgia)
- April 7–8: MoCCA Festival (Metropolitan West, New York City)
- April 28–29: Small Press and Alternative Comics Expo (S.P.A.C.E.) (Northland Performing Arts Center, Columbus, Ohio)
- May 19: East Coast Black Age of Comics Convention (ECBACC) (TECH Freire Charter School, Philadelphia, Pennsylvania)
- June 2–3: Chicago Alternative Comics Expo (CAKE) (Center on Halsted, Chicago, Illinois) — special guests: Tony Breed, Eddie Campbell, Nick Drnaso, Nicole Hollander, Audrey Niffenegger, Mimi Pond, Fiona Smyth, Carol Tyler, Georgia Webber, Jim Woodring, Gina Wynbrandt, Bianca Xunise
- September 8–9: STAPLE! (Millennium Youth Entertainment Complex, Austin, Texas)
- September 15–16: Small Press Expo (Bethesda North Marriott Hotel & Conference Center, North Bethesda, Maryland)
- September 27–30 Cartoon Crossroads Columbus (Columbus, Ohio) — special guests Liana Finck, Georgia Webber, M. K. Czerwiec, Rachel Lindsay, Hilary Price, Noah Van Sciver, Emi Gennis, Michael DeForge, Annie Koyama, Dustin Harbin, Keiler Roberts, Jessica Campbell, Jim Woodring, Lynn Johnston, and Darrin Bell
- October 21–22: Massachusetts Independent Comics Expo [MICE] (Lesley University's University Hall, Cambridge, Massachusetts) — special guests include Jim Woodring and Charles Forsman
- November 11 (Comic Arts Brooklyn) (CAB) (Pratt Institute, Brooklyn, New York) — special guests Doug Allen, Austin English, Charles Burns, Mike Diana, Julie Doucet, Simon Hanselmann, Frank Henenlotter, Todd James, Patrick Kyle, Xander Marro, Mark Newgarden, Dirt Palace, Ariel Schrag, Olivier Schrauwen, Nick Thorburn, Matthew Thurber, Lauren Weinstein, Jim Woodring
- December 8–9 Comic Arts Los Angeles (Homenetmen Ararat, Glendale, Los Angeles, California) — featured guest: Ronald Wimberly

== First issues by title ==
Doctor Strange: Damnation
Released February by Marvel Comics. Writers: Donny Cates and Nick Spencer Artist: Rod Reis
Farmhand
Released July by Image Comics. Writer & Artist: Rob Guillory
Sonic the Hedgehog
Released April by IDW Publishing. Writer: Ian Flynn Artist: Tracy Yardley
X-Men Red
Released February by Marvel Comics. Writer: Tom Taylor Artist: Mahmud Asrar
LaGuardia
Released December by Berger Books. Writer: Nnedi Okorafor Artist: Tana Ford
