= Family of Mike Pence =

Pence family
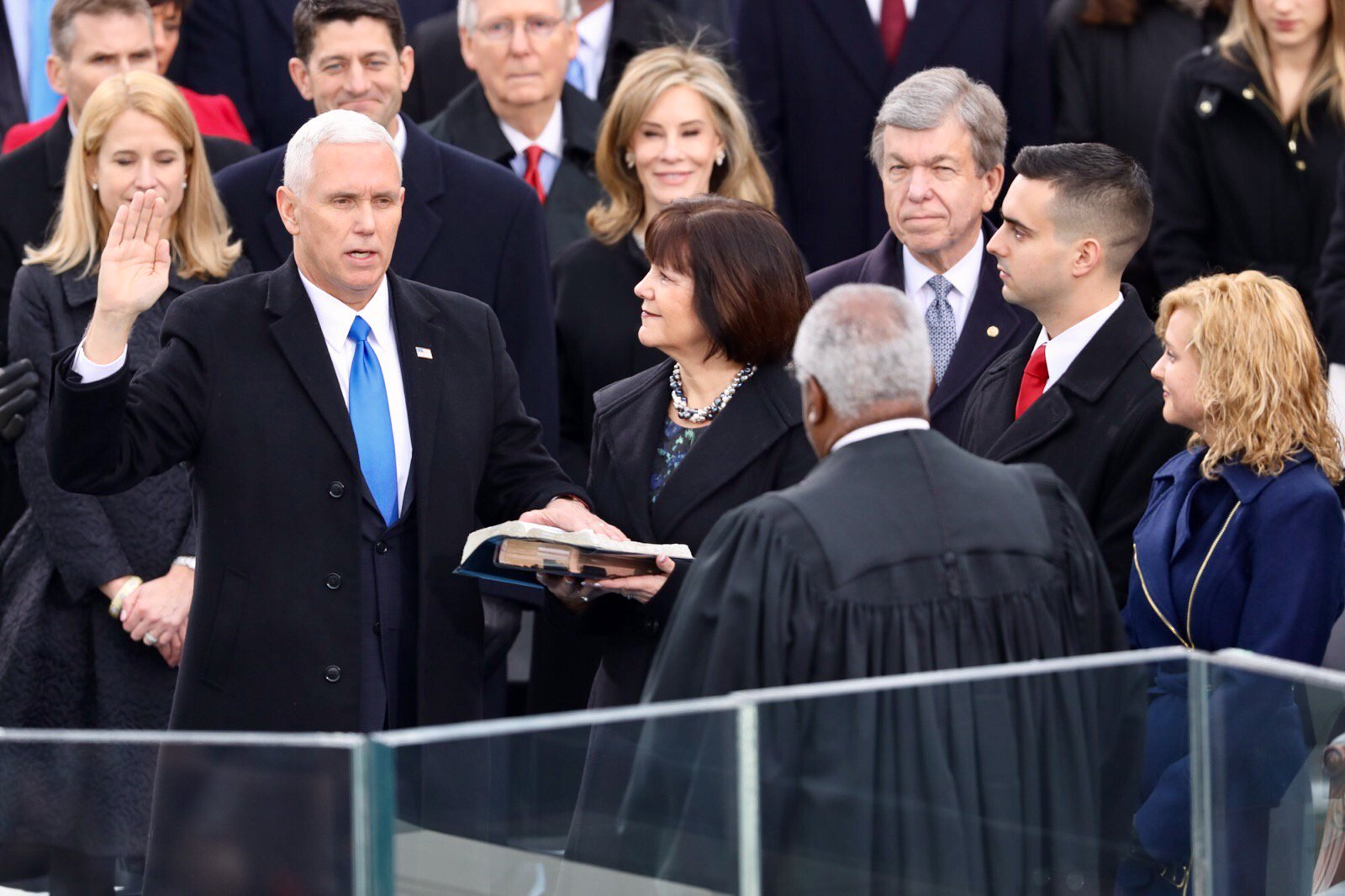
- Pence family in 2017
- Origin: Magdeburg, Germany, Switzerland, Ireland, Virginia and Bartholomew County in Indiana
- Titles: List: Vice President of the United States; Second Lady of the United States; Governor of Indiana; First Lady of Indiana; United States Representative (Indiana)
- Members: Mike Pence; Karen Pence; Mike Pence Jr.; Charlotte Pence; Audrey Pence
- Connected members: Greg Pence; John Pence

The Pence family is a prominent family in the United States who was the First family of Indiana from 2013 to 2017, and the Second family of the United States from 2017 until 2021.

Mike Pence, an American politician and lawyer, is considered the patriarch of the family. Throughout his career, he served as the 48th Vice President of the United States, the 50th Governor of Indiana, and as the United States Representative for Indiana's 2nd congressional district and Indiana's 6th congressional district.

The family originates from Magdeburg, Germany, where the name was originally Bentz. The family also originated from Switzerland and Bartholomew County, Indiana. The family is currently based in the Columbus, Indiana, area, and in Carmel, Indiana, where the family owns a $1.93 million, 10,300-square-foot estate.

== History ==
Before the 1700s, the lineage existed as a medieval and early modern European family rooted primarily in Germany and Switzerland.

Around the 1740s, the three major branches of the Pence family had migrated from Pennsylvania to Virginia's Shenandoah Valley. The family had established deep roots into Shenandoah county, Rockingham County, and Page County in Virginia.

Over the next century, multiple generations of the family had moved progressively Westward.

By the 1820s to mid-1830s many branches of the Pence family had migrated to Bartholomew County, Indiana. The move had been started by several members of the family including Jacob Pence and Judge John Pence.

By the mid-1800s, descendants of the original Pennsylvania and Virginia Pences scattered across the Midwestern United States.

The family when moving to Indiana were involved in local government and agriculture through decades in the deep South of Indiana.

The Pence family for around the last 200 years has established the family's history as Hoosiers.

The Pence family last name comes from German descent but it has dual roots functioning as an American form of German descent. It comes from the German surname Penz or Benz. The last name also has a rare English nickname derived from the English middle word Pense which means pennies or Pence. The earliest records of the family name in America date back to 1727.

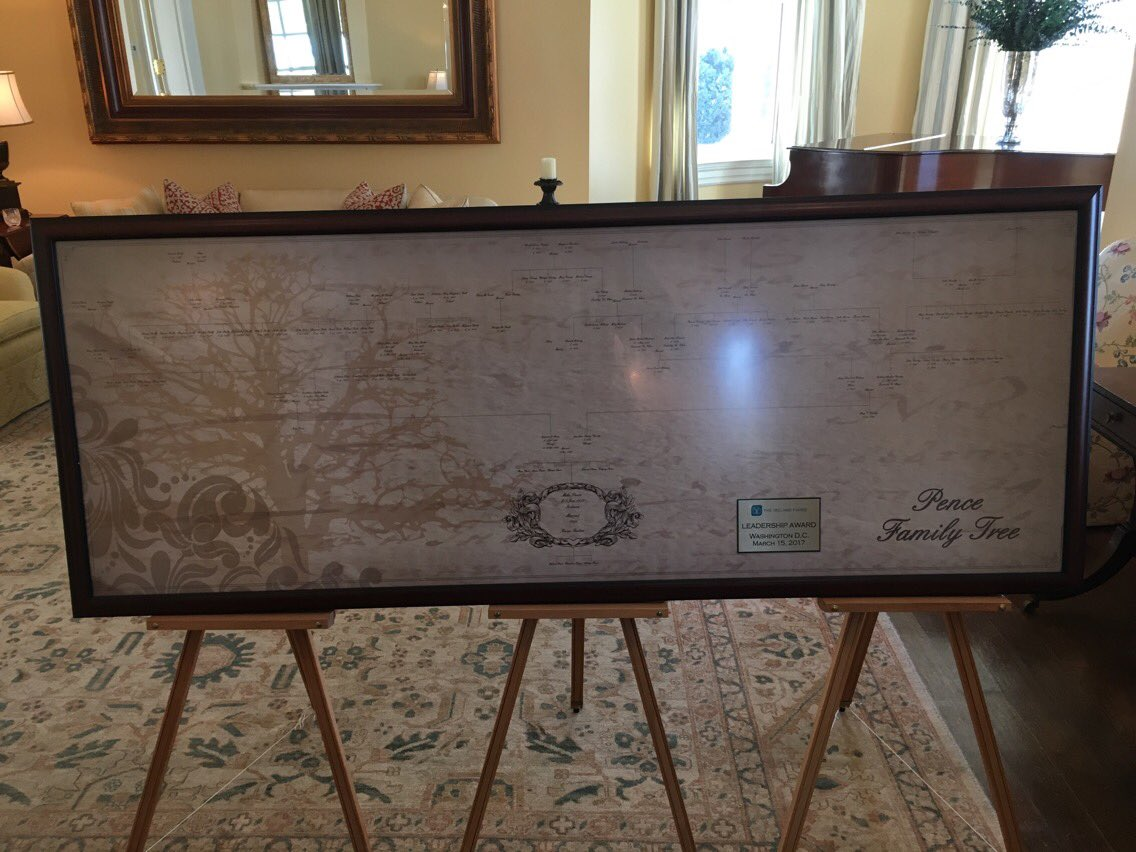
Pence family tree

== Wife and children ==
=== Karen Pence ===
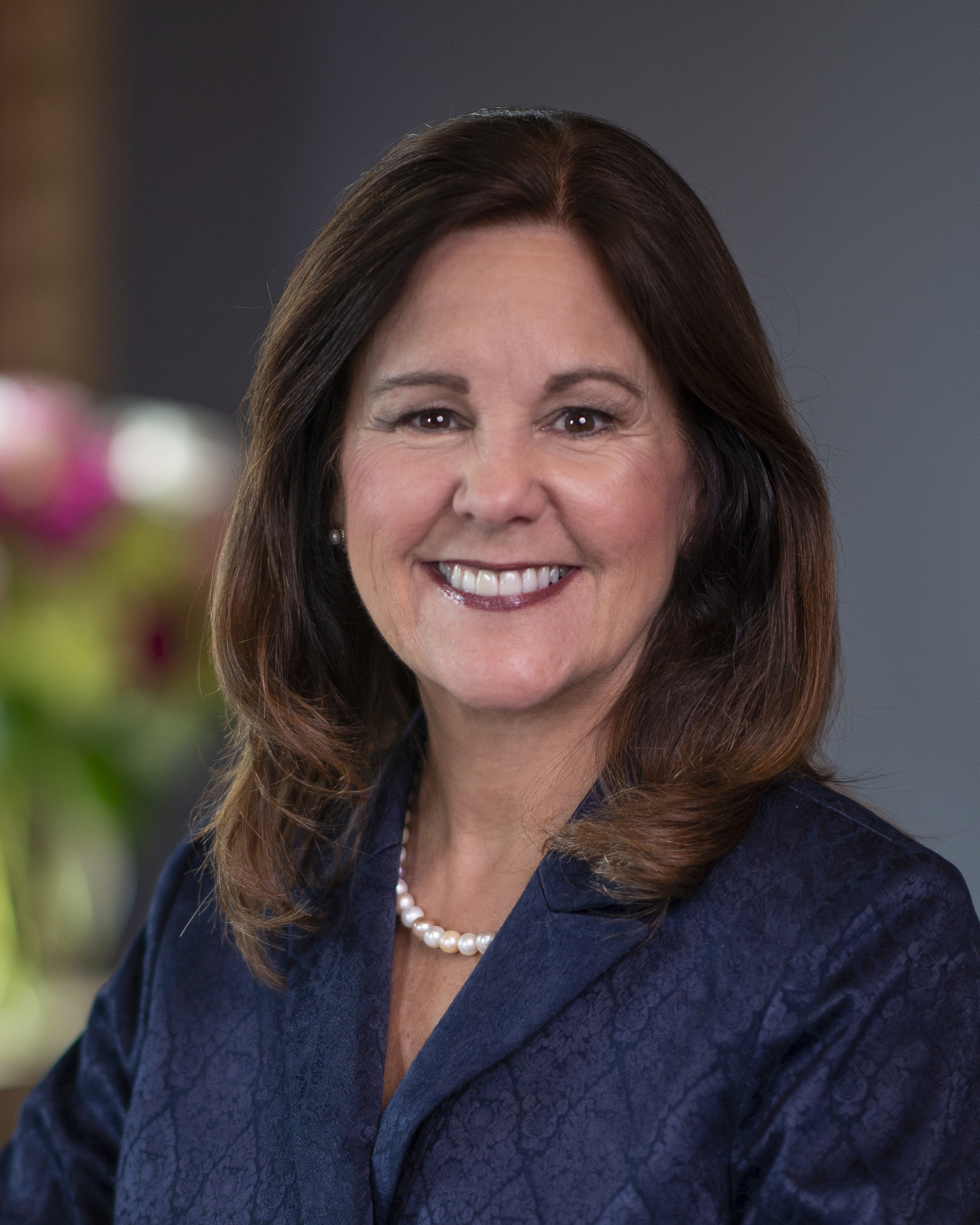
Official portrait, 2019

Karen Sue Pence (née Batten, formerly Whitaker; born January 1, 1957) is the wife of former Vice President of the United States, Mike Pence. Together they have three children. She was previously married to John Steven Whitacker though the marriage ended in divorce. She was the First Lady of Indiana when her husband was governor of the state and she was Second Lady of the United States during her husband's tenure as Vice President of the United States. Together her and her husband had three children, Michael, Charlotte and Audrey and they have five grandchildren.

Pence attended Butler University and got two degrees: one, a Bachelor of Science degree and a Master of Science degree. Through her life Pence was a schoolteacher who taught art. She continued to be into art and raised awareness about it when she was First Lady of Indiana and Second Lady of the United States.

=== Mike Pence Jr. ===
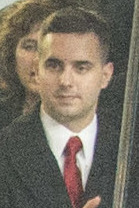
Mike Pence Jr

Michael Joseph Pence Jr. (born 1991) is the eldest child and the only son of Vice President of the United States, Mike Pence and his wife Second Lady of the United States, Karen Pence.

Pence is a career military officer serving as a captain and naval aviator in the United States Marine Corps. He graduated from Purdue University.

Reports show that he had played a pivotal role on January 6 in advising his father to certify the 2020 United States presidential election. He had reportedly reminded his father of the oath he had taken to the United States Constitution in helping him to certify the election for Joe Biden and Kamala Harris. He married his wife Sarah Whiteside in December 2016 in a ceremony at the Indiana Governor's Residence. They have three children together.

=== Charlotte Pence Bond ===
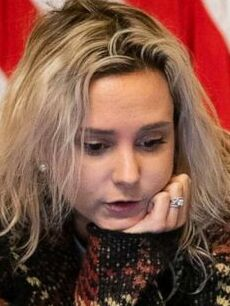
Charlotte Pence in 2021

Charlotte Rose Pence Bond is an American author, filmmaker and journalist who is the daughter of former Vice President of the United States Mike Pence and former Second lady of the United States Karen Pence.

She graduated from DePaul University with a double major in Digital Cinema Screenwriting and English, and later attended Harvard Divinity School.She married Naval officer Henry Bond in December 2019. The couple was introduced by Pence's brother Michael who served with Bond in the military. Together they have two children, a son and a daughter.

With her career, she wrote a highly successful children's book, Marlon Bundo's A Day in the Life of the Vice President which featured her pet bunny Marlon Bundo, the book was illustrated by her mother. She also authored Where You Go: Life Lessons from My Father (2018). The book talks about her perspective during her father's vice presidency and faith. She also co-authored a book Go Home with Your Father: Finding God's Direction when Your Plan Fails (2024) with her father. In 2014, while a student, Pence had co-written and served as an associate producer for Fleeced a documentary highlighting senior financial abuse, which won a Regional Emmy Award. She also hosts the podcast Doubting It and she works for The Daily Wire with news and podcasting coverages.

=== Audrey Pence ===
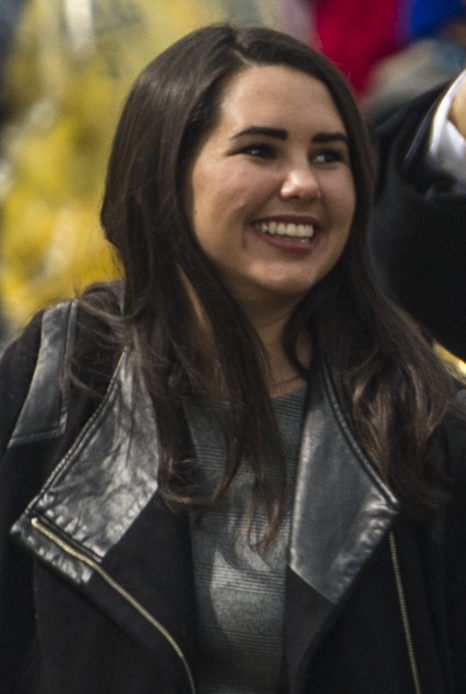
Audrey Pence

Audrey Pence Tomanelli is a practicing attorney who is the daughter of former Vice President of the United States Mike Pence and Second Lady of the United States Karen Pence.

Pence is a practicing attorney who is an associate in a Washington, D.C. office. Her practice focuses on white-collar crimes, congressional investigations, and government investigations. She previously had served as an Assistant United States Attorney in the Criminal Division for the United States District Court for the Southern District of Florida where she had prosecuted violent crimes and offenses against children. She earned her Juris Doctor (J.D.) from Yale Law School. She had also earned her Undergraduate degree in International affairs from Northeastern University where she had also minored in Arabic.

She is also known for her different political views from her family and she describes herself as independent and socially liberal often voting different than her father. Her father has said that he respects her independence and is proud of her achievements.

Pence married her husband Daniel Tomanelli, on November 1, 2020. They had been college boyfriend and girlfriend before this and had met in 2015 during a study abroad program in the Balkans. She and her husband have no children.

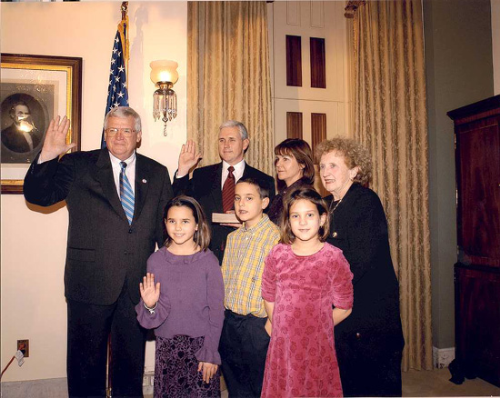
Pence family watch while Mike is sworn into congress in 2001

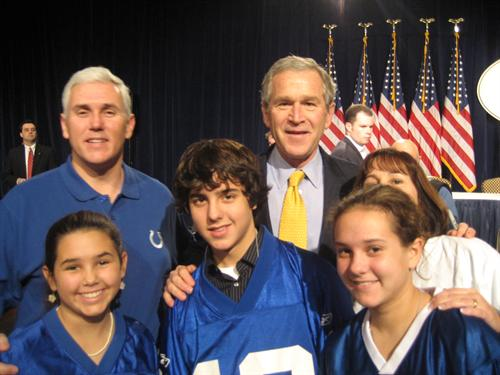
Pence family with President of the United States, George W. Bush

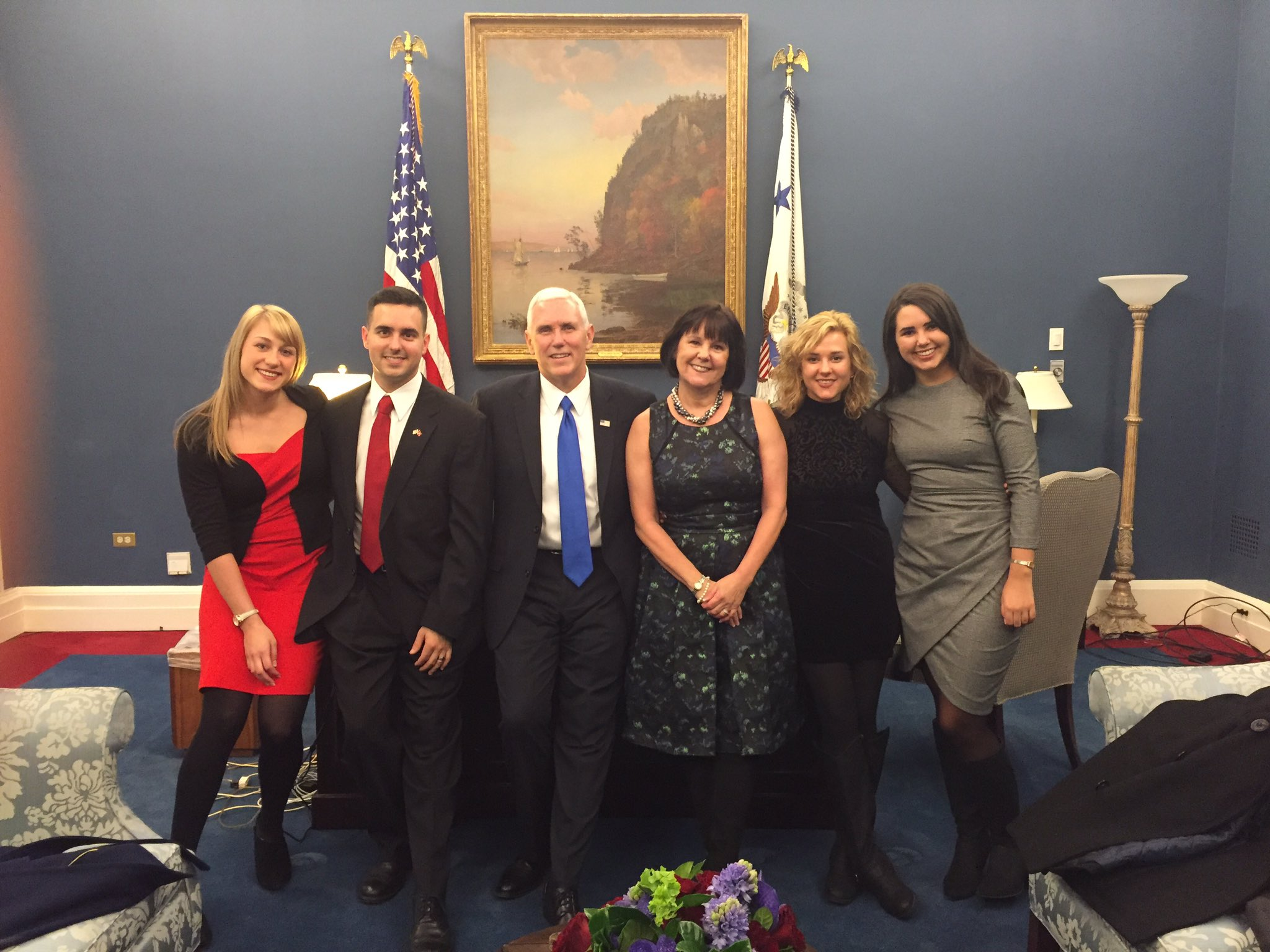
Pence family in 2017

== Grandchildren ==
Mike Pence and his wife have four grandchildren. Their son and his wife Sarah have two daughters. They have a daughter, Avery Grace who was born in 2021 and another daughter born in 2023 who is named Elene Marie. Their daughter Charlotte and her husband have two children one of whom includes a daughter, who is named Etta Rose. Their other daughter and her husband have no children.

== Parents ==
=== Edward Pence ===
Edward Pence
- Born: Edward Joseph Pence Jr. July 5, 1929; Chicago, Illinois, U.S.
- Died: April 13, 1988 (aged 58); Columbus, Indiana, U.S.
- Political party: Republican
- Other political affiliations: Democratic
- Spouse: Ann Cawley (m. 1956)
- Children: 6, including Greg and Mike

Edward Joseph Pence Jr. (July 5, 1929 – April 13, 1988) was an American businessman and military veteran who also was the father of Vice President of the United States, Mike Pence and United States Representative Greg Pence.

Born in Chicago Illinois, on July 5, 1929, to Edward Joseph Pence Sr. (a Chicago stockyards worker) and Geraldine Kathleen Kuhn Pence, he grew up in a working class environment where his father worked in the Chicago stockyards.

Pence attended Loyola University Chicago.

In 1950, Pence registered for military service and he served as a United States Army soldier during the Korean War. He had risen to the rank of 2nd lieutenant and he was awarded a Bronze Star Medal on April 15, 1953, for his service.

He married Ann Jane Cawley on January 7, 1956, and remained married until his death. Together they had six children, four sons who are Edward III, Greg, Mike and Thomas. They also had two daughters Anne and Mary Therese.

In 1959, the family had relocated from Chicago to Columbus, Indiana. He raised his family to be in a deeply patriotic, religious and conservative Roman Catholic environment.

Pence worked in the oil industry where he spent the majority of his professional career. He worked in the oil and petroleum distribution industry. Pence spent 23 years working for the Kiel Brothers Oil Company. The company had operated a chain of gas stations and convenience stores. With hard work, Pence rose to the position of vice president of the company. Pence was highly active in regional trade and civic organizations. This had included serving on the Indiana Oil Marketers Association, the Marathon Jobber Council and the Columbus Area Chamber of Commerce, and as a director for Columbus Pro Musica.

Pence and his family were lifelong Democrats and voted Democratic in every election. However, in the 1964 United States presidential election after the assassination of John F. Kennedy they did not vote for his successor Lyndon B. Johnson and instead voted for United States Senator from Arizona, Barry Goldwater. The family eventually became more and more Republican during the Presidency of Ronald Reagan in the 1980s. He died before his son's political career as a Republican.

Unexpectedly, Pence died on April 13, 1988, as a result of a heart attack. He had become ill while playing golf at the Harrison Lake Country Club and he died in the emergency room at the Bartholomew County Hospital.

Pence is laid to rest at the Garland Brook Cemetery in Columbus, Indiana.

His son Mike Pence references his father as the embodiment of the American Dream citing his military service, work ethic and family values, resulting as a guiding source in his political career. The Bronze Star Medal Pence had earned for his military service was displayed in his son's office while he was vice president from 2017 to 2021.

=== Nancy Jane Pence ===
Nancy Pence Fritsch
- Born: Ann Jane Cawley; 1932 (age 93–94); Illinois, U.S.
- Other name: Nancy Pence
- Political party: Republican
- Other political affiliations: Democratic
- Spouses: Edward Pence (m. 1956; died 1988); Basil Fritsch (m. 2004)
- Children: 6, including Greg and Mike

Ann Jane "Nancy" Pence Fritsch (née Cawley; born 1932) is the mother of former Vice President of the United States Mike Pence and former United States House of Representatives member from Indiana Greg Pence. She was married to Edward Pence until his death and remarried in 2004.

Anne Jane "Nancy" Cawley was born in 1932 in Illinois Richard Michael Cawley and Mary Elizabeth Maloney. She is of Irish descent. In the 20th century her father had immigrated to the United States from Doonbeg, Ireland. She grew up in Chicago, Illinois, and went to college to get a bachelor's degree in Psychology.

She married Edward Pence on January 7, 1956, and they had six children, Edward III, Greg, Mike, Thomas, Anne and Mary Therese. Her husband unexpectedly died of a heart attack in 1988. She later remarried Basil Coolidge Fritsch in 2004 in Columbus, Indiana.

Pence had raised her children in a structured environment. She raised her children to be Roman Catholic. Her family has frequently credited her with instilling strong foundational values of faith and hard work.

With her career her main priority was to manage the household with her having six young children. She also strongly supported her husband's career in the managing gas stations and with convenience stores. In her later years she was speaker at regional political and fundraising events she also came into the public spotlight during her sons, Mike Pence's political career when he was a Congressman, Governor of Indiana and Vice President from 2017 to 2021. She also was involved with community service and volunteering for anti-abortion movements in Bartholomew County, Indiana.

Pence and her family were lifelong Democrats and voted democratic in every election. However, in the 1964 United States presidential election after the Assassination of John F. Kennedy they did not vote for his successor Lyndon B. Johnson and instead voted for United States Senator from Arizona Barry Goldwater. The family eventually became more and more Republican during the Presidency of Ronald Reagan in the 1980s. She also had strongly supported her sons' political careers.

== Parents-in-law ==
=== John Batten ===
John Batten
- Born: John Marshall Batten; October 10, 1931; Indianapolis, Indiana, U.S.
- Died: February 21, 1988 (aged 56); Henderson, Nevada, U.S.
- Spouses: Lillian Hacker (m. 1951, divorced) (Note: Batten and Hacker divorced sometime in the late 1950s or early 1960s.); Margaret Holliday (m. 1963)
- Children: 3, including Karen (Note: Batten also had two stepsons from his second marriage.)

John Marshall Batten (October 10, 1931 – February 21, 1988) was the father of former Second Lady of the United States Karen Pence and the father-in-law of Vice President of the United States, Mike Pence from 2017 to 2021.

John Marshall Batten was born on October 10, 1931, in Indianapolis, Indiana. His father was LaVern Alphonso Batten (1900–1964) and his mother was Nadine Lucile Hering (1905–1984). He was born in the Midwestern region in The United States during the Great Depression. He grew up with two brothers, Richard T. Batten and William W. Batten.

On January 10, 1951, at age 19, he married Lillian Rose Hacker (1931–2004) in Jefferson, Kentucky. They had three children including Karen Pence who married John Whitaker and they divorced. She then married future Vice President of the United States Mike Pence and they had three children. He and Hacker divorced when Karen was a toddler and he remarried Margaret Holliday and had two stepsons. All his children include Karen Pence, Marsha Louzon, and Sheryl Donella, alongside stepsons Kenneth Holliday and Don Holliday.

Batten had a very successful career in commercial aviation holding high roles in different headquarters. He served as vice president and treasurer of United Airlines. Because of his career his family moved frequently to places like Texas, Illinois and Kansas where Karen was born.

Batten unexpectedly died on February 21, 1988, at the age of 56 in Henderson, Nevada, just outside of Las Vegas. His body was returned to Indianapolis In Indiana and a Funeral service was held for him on March 12, 1988, at the First Lutheran Church in Indianapolis.

=== Lillian Barcio ===
Lillian Barcio
- Born: Lillian Rose Hacker; 1931; United States
- Died: March 2004 (aged 72–73); United States
- Other names: Lillian Hacker; Lillian Batten
- Spouses: John Batten (m. 1951, divorced); Bernard Barcio (m. 1967)
- Children: 3, including Karen

Lillian Rose Barcio (née Hacker, born 1931; died 2004) formerly Lillia Rose Pence was the mother of former Second Lady of the United States Karen Pence and the father-in-law of Vice President of the United States, Mike Pence from 2017 to 2021.

Hacker was born in 1931 during the Great Depression.

On January 10, 1951, at age 18–19 she married John Batten and together they had three children one of whom was Karen Pence who later became Second Lady of the United States and was the First Lady of Indiana when her husband was Vice President of the United States and Governor of Indiana. Her daughter Karen was born at McConnell Air Force Base in Kansas where she worked. Her and her husband later divorced when Karen was a toddler and she married Bernard Barcio in 1967 and they remained married. When she remarried she became known as Lillian Barcio.

Lillian became an essential figure in Broad Ripple Village, Indianapolis, which was a wealthy neighborhood in Indiana. Lillian created the The Village Sampler which was a very popular and free community newspaper distributed throughout Broad Ripple. She famously wrote about and preserved the memories of the old Vogue Theater, the Broad Ripple Trolley the White River paddle boat history, and the Great Train Wreck on the Monon line. She was also known as a champion for small business owners using her media footprint to promote local commerce.

Lillian also had a major impact on her children including her daughter Karen Pence. Her entrepreneurial spirit and love for local culture heavily influenced her daughter. Watching her as an artist is what helped her daughter Karen to pursue a career in this profession.

She died in Indianapolis in March 1994 at the age of 72.

== Other relatives ==
=== Edward Pence Sr. ===
Edward Joseph Pence Sr. was the paternal grandfather of Vice President of the United States, Mike Pence. He was of German and Irish descent. Pence lived in Chicago, Illinois. He worked hard labor jobs in the Chicago stockyards.

=== Richard Cawley ===
Richard Michael Cawley was born in 1903 and grew up in a small cottage in near Tubbercurry on the border of County Mayo and County Sligo both in Ireland. He was the maternal grandfather of Mike Pence who was the Vice President of the United States.

When he was young, he enlisted into the Irish Free State Army. He then fled to England to save money for a passage to go to America. He immigrated through the Ellis Island on April 11, 1923, which was then followed by an aunt and his brother James. He then settled on the south side of Chicago and for 40 years he drove a city bus.

=== Greg Pence ===
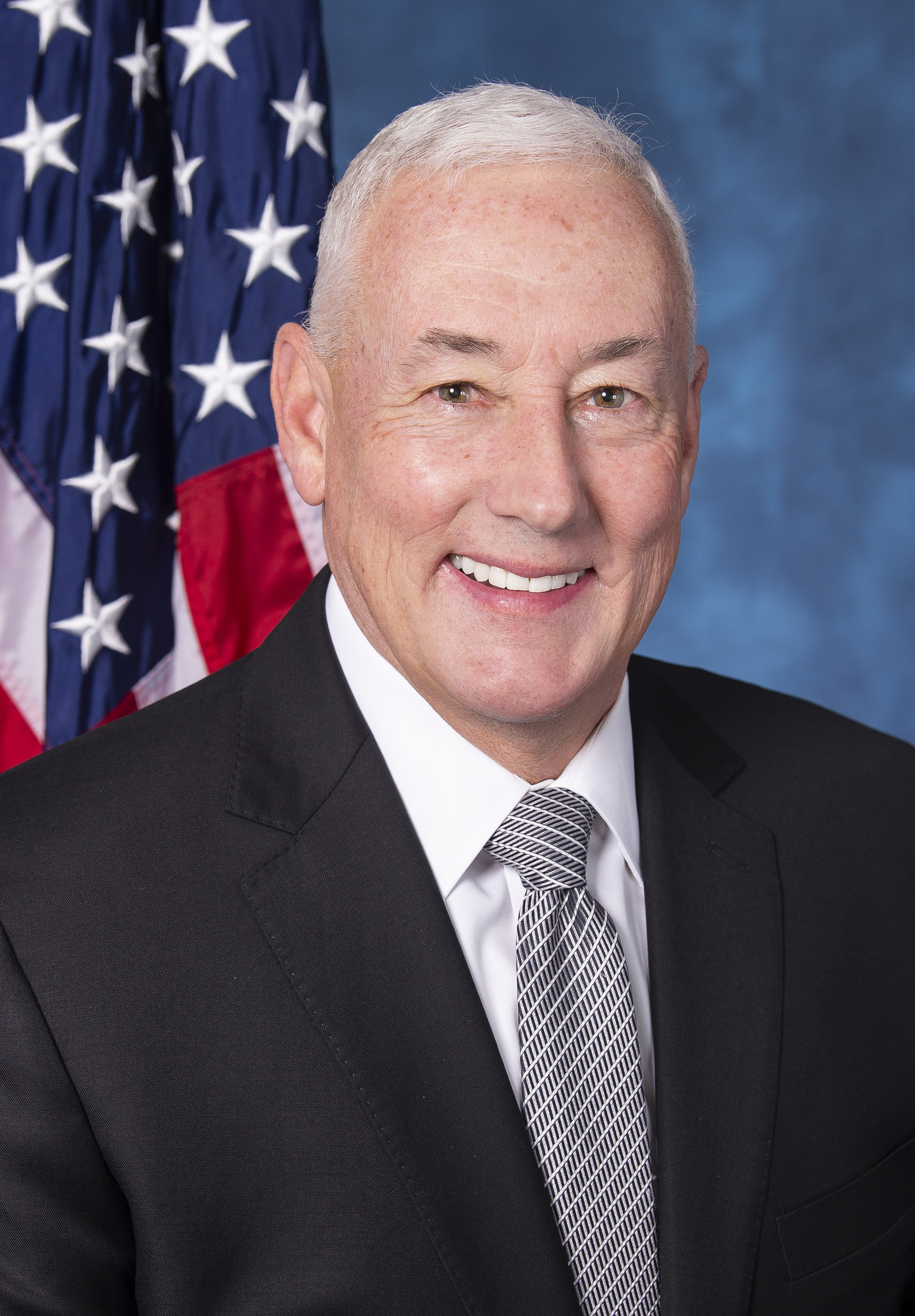
Greg Pence, official portrait

Gregory Joseph Pence (born November 14, 1956) is the older brother of Vice President Mike Pence. He is a businessman and a politician. He served in the United States House of Representatives from 2019 to 2025 representing Indiana's 6th congressional district, the same district his brother had once represented. He succeeded Luke Messer and did not run for re-election in 2025 and was succeeded by Jefferson Shreve. He is a member of the Republican Party in the United States.

Pence and his wife, Denise, own two antique malls. They have four children, one including John Pence and ten grandchildren. Pence is a practicing Catholic and attends St. Bartholomew Catholic Church in Columbus.

=== John Pence ===
John Edward Pence (born June 13, 1989) is the nephew of Vice President Mike Pence and the son of former United States House of Representatives member from Indiana, Greg Pence. He married his wife Giovanna Coia in 2019.

A member of the Republican Party he was a part of Donald Trumps 2020 presidential campaign for his re-election bid in the 2020 United States presidential election.

== Pets ==
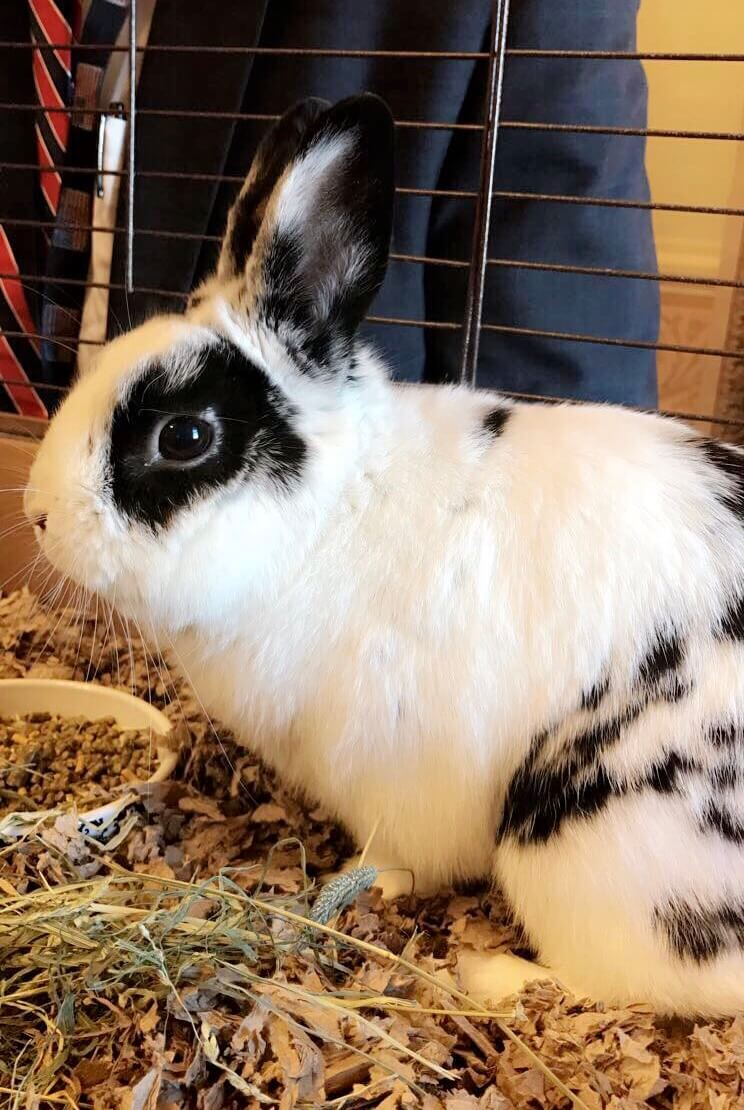
Marlon Bundo in 2017

The Pence family has had multiple pets. They had an orange cat named Pickle, a black and white cat named Oreo who died in 2017, an Australian Shepherd puppy given to Mike Pence for Father's Day in 2017, they also had a little gray kitten who was named Hazel. They also had a 13-year-old beagle named Maverick who died shortly before the 2016 United States presidential election, they also had a snake and many other pets.

The most notable pet of the Pence family is their bunny named Marlon Bundo who was born in either 2012 or 2013 and died on January 15, 2022. Their daughter Charlotte Pence Bond and Karen Pence published a book about him which is titled Marlon Bundo's A Day in the Life of the Vice President. The writing was by Charlotte and the illustrations were by Karen Pence.

He was named after Marlon Brando and he lived in the United States Naval Observatory from 2017 to 2021 when Mike Pence was Vice President of the United States. He also had his own Instagram account.

== See also ==
- Family of Donald Trump
- Family of JD Vance
- Family of Joe Biden
- Family of Kamala Harris
