= Gerald Kelley =

American children's book illustrator

Gerald Kelley is an American children's book illustrator. He works in an elaborate style with water color and precise detail. Kelley is known for his work on James Bowen's Bob the Cat series and A Day in the Life of Marlon Bundo, a best-selling children's book written by Jill Twiss.

== Early life and education ==
Kelley was born in Texas and later moved to Florida. He earned a degree in studio art. As an illustrator, he is mostly self-taught, receiving his education from another artist. He regards Albert Uderzo, Peter de Seve, Rien Poortvliet, Jon J. Muth, John Pike, Victor Ambrus, Lisbeth Zwerger, Brian Wildsmith and John Burningham as his artistic influences, as well as television cartoons and animated movies.

== Career ==
=== Bob the Cat series ===
In 2014, Kelley illustrated two books in James Bowen's best-selling Bob the Cat series. This series started in 2013 with A Street Cat Named Bob, a book relating the real-life events of Bowen taking in a wounded stray cat, nursing him back to health, and getting over his own addictions in the process. It was followed by a sequel called The World According to Bob and children's versions of both books.

The two books illustrated by Kelley are intended for young children. My Name is Bob is an imagined prequel about Bob's life prior to Bowen's first book, telling the story of how the cat ended up on the streets. In Bob to the Rescue, Bob helps a homeless puppy find its owner.

=== Grover Cleveland, Again! ===
In 2016, Kelley created the graphics for children's educational book Grover Cleveland, Again! A Treasury of American Presidents written by the documentary film maker Ken Burns' and which profiles each of the presidents of the United States.

The book was included in the 2017 Notable Social Studies Trade Books for Young People reading list of exceptional books for use in social studies classrooms, created by the National Council for the Social Studies and the Children's Book Council. It was nominated for the 2016 Children’s and Young Adult Bloggers Literary Awards, an annual award for juvenile and children’s books that successfully combine literary merit and popular appeal.

=== Please Please the Bees ===
Please Please the Bees (2017) was Kelley's debut as a children's writer, telling the story of a grumpy bear who learns a lesson when the honey bees in his garden go on strike, demanding improvements in their living and working conditions. It received positive reviews.

It was awarded the 2017 Frances and Wesley Bock Book Award for Children's Literature, an award for books that promote a moral attitude and appeals to young children's sense of wonder and curiosity.

=== A Day in the Life of Marlon Bundo ===
In March 2018, Kelley illustrated a children's book called A Day in the Life of Marlon Bundo under the pseudonym EG Keller. The book, written by Jill Twiss, is about a fictional day in the life of Marlon Bundo, the real-life pet rabbit of the Vice President of the United States, Mike Pence. The story details the same-sex romance between Marlon Bundo and another rabbit named Wesley. It was conceptualized as a loose parody of Marlon Bundo's A Day in the Life of the Vice President, written by Charlotte Pence and illustrated by Karen Pence (Mike Pence's daughter and wife, respectively). Their book also tells about a fictionalized day of the Pence family's pet rabbit, but without LGBT themes.

A Day in the Life of Marlon Bundo was launched during an episode of the satirical talk show Last Week Tonight with John Oliver with the intent to mock Pence's staunch opposition to same-sex marriage. Rather than a straight-up parody of the Pences' book, A Day in the Life of Marlon Bundo is an actual children's story about marriage equality and democracy. It nevertheless contains some stabs at Mike Pence.

The book became an immediate bestseller, receiving notable praise and selling much better than expected. All profits from the book are being donated to The Trevor Project and AIDS United.
