= A Street Cat Named Bob (film) =

- British release poster
- Directed by: Roger Spottiswoode
- Written by: Tim John; Maria Nation
- Based on: A Street Cat Named Bob and The World According to Bob by James Bowen
- Produced by: Adam Rolston
- Starring: Luke Treadaway; Ruta Gedmintas; Joanne Froggatt; Anthony Head; Caroline Goodall; Bob The Cat
- Cinematography: Peter Wunstorf
- Edited by: Paul Tothill
- Music by: David Hirschfelder; Charlie Fink
- Production companies: Stage 6 Films; Shooting Script Films; Prescience; Iris Productions; The Exchange
- Distributed by: Sony Pictures Releasing International
- Release dates: 3 November 2016 (London premiere); 4 November 2016 (United Kingdom)
- Running time: 103 minutes
- Country: United Kingdom
- Language: English
- Budget: $8 million
- Box office: $17.9 million

A Street Cat Named Bob is a 2016 British biographical drama film directed by Roger Spottiswoode and written by Tim John and Maria Nation. It is based on the book of the same name and The World According to Bob by James Bowen. The film stars Luke Treadaway, Ruta Gedmintas, Joanne Froggatt, Anthony Head, and Bob the Cat as himself. The film premiered in London on 3 November 2016, followed by a general release the next day. The title is a spoof of A Streetcar Named Desire.

The film won Best British Film at the UK National Film Awards on 29 March 2017.

A Christmas-themed sequel, A Gift from Bob, was released to UK theatres in November 2020. The film was released posthumously, as Bob the cat died in June 2020.

== Plot ==
James Bowen is a destitute and homeless recovering heroin addict living on the streets of London. After a life-threatening drug-related incident, his support worker Val gets him off the street and into a council flat with a methadone prescription. On his first night in his flat James discovers a cat rifling through his food. James tries to return the cat to his owners, and lets him go. The cat returns to James's flat with a purulent wound on his back leg. James' animal-loving but allergic neighbour Betty directs James to a charity vet where she volunteers, and names the cat Bob.

James misses a meeting with Val while waiting on a queue at the vet. James has Bob neutered and sets him free but Bob keeps following James into town. When Bob begins drawing crowds of people, and making James more panhandling money, he decides to keep Bob. Bob becomes a tourist hotspot and James and Betty become romantically attached.

James finds his old friend, Baz, unconscious on his flat estate, overdosed on heroin. Baz dies in hospital, and James finds out Betty can't be around drug addicts, as her deceased brother had been one. On New Year's Eve, James takes Bob to visit his biological father, Jack, his stepmother, Hilary, and his sisters, Pris and Faith. Bob destroys their living room, and Hilary sends James and Bob out.

During a busking performance, James argues with a thug and James is arrested for the ensuing crowd brawl. He's cleared of charges but prohibited from busking for six months. He argues with Betty at the pharmacy he receives his methadone, and they part ways. James visits the offices of The Big Issue and earns money selling copies to tourists. After being accused of illegally selling magazines on another vendor's patch, James and Bob are banned for a whole month. James scuffles with a rude woman trying to buy Bob, who runs off. Deavasted when Bob fails to show up for a few days, his return leaves James feeling ready to come off the methadone. Bob stays with him during a week of withdrawal symptoms. James emerges clean and healthy. He visits Betty, who is moving to a better life. They part on good terms. James agrees to cooperate with a journalist, Mary, who writes a book about James and Bob and their Internet and media popularity.

James repairs his relationship with his father Jack. His life has turned around. At a book signing, James is honoured by Val, his father, and Betty, who remains a supportive friend to James and Bob.

== Cast ==
- Luke Treadaway as James Bowen
  - The real James Bowen makes a cameo appearance, asking an autograph from his character
- Bob as himself
  - Stand-ins for Bob: Oscar, Booker, Jafffa, Leo, Ricki and Trayce
- Ruta Gedmintas as Elizabeth "Betty" Robinson, James's animal-loving neighbour and love interest
- Joanne Froggatt as Val, James's drug support worker
- Anthony Head as Jack Bowen, James's remarried father
- Beth Goddard as Hilary Bowen, Jack's wife and James's stepmother
- Caroline Goodall as Mary, an American journalist who persuades him to write a book about Bob
- Darren Evans as Baz, James's old friend who did not recover from heroin addiction
- Ruth Sheen as Elsie, a kind middle-aged woman, who gives presents to Bob
- Nina Wadia as Bus Conductress

== Production and release ==
On 24 August 2015, it was announced that Roger Spottiswoode would direct a film based on the book A Street Cat Named Bob by James Bowen, while Tim John scripted the film. Adam Rolston would produce the film through his Shooting Script Films. The Exchange sold the film's international rights. Maria Nation also wrote the script.

Principal photography on the film began on 25 October 2015 in London, at Twickenham Film Studios and on location in Covent Garden. Filming wrapped on 6 December 2015.

The world premiere of A Street Cat Named Bob took place at the Curzon Mayfair Cinema, London on 3 November 2016 and was attended by the Duchess of Cambridge. The film opened to the public in the UK on 4 November and in the US on 18 November.

== Reception ==
=== Box office ===
A Street Cat Named Bob grossed $82,703 in the United States and Canada and $17,852,881 in other countries for a worldwide total of nearly $18 million, against a production budget of $8 million.

=== Critical response ===
On review aggregator Rotten Tomatoes, the film has an approval rating of 77% based on 65 reviews, with an average score of 5.9/10. The site's critical consensus reads, "A Street Cat Named Bob uses a fact-based feelgood tale as the inspiration for an unapologetically heartwarming movie that should move all but the most cynical of viewers." On Metacritic, the film has a score of 54 out of 100, based on 12 critics, indicating "mixed or average reviews".

== Awards and nominations ==
=== Awards ===
National Film Awards UK

- Best British Film: 2017
