= A Gift from Bob =

2020 film by Charles Martin Smith

- Film poster
- Directed by: Charles Martin Smith
- Written by: Garry Jenkins
- Based on: A Gift from Bob and The Little Book of Bob by James Bowen
- Produced by: Adam Rolston; Stephen Jarvis; Tracy Jarvis; Martin Metz; Adrian Politowski
- Starring: Luke Treadaway; Anna Wilson-Jones; Kristina Tonteri-Young; Nina Wadia; Tim Plester; Bob the Cat
- Cinematography: David Connell
- Edited by: Chris Blunden
- Music by: Patrick Neil Doyle
- Production companies: Studio Pictures; Parkhouse Pictures; Align; The Exchange; Twickenham Studios
- Distributed by: Lionsgate
- Release date: 6 November 2020
- Running time: 93 minutes
- Country: United Kingdom
- Language: English

A Gift from Bob (promoted as A Christmas Gift from Bob) is a 2020 British Christmas biographical drama film directed by Charles Martin Smith and written by Garry Jenkins, based on the non-fiction books A Gift from Bob and The Little Book of Bob by James Bowen. It is a sequel to the 2016 film A Street Cat Named Bob, and stars Luke Treadaway, reprising his role as Bowen. Anna Wilson-Jones, Kristina Tonteri-Young, and Bob the Cat co-star. It was released in the United Kingdom by Lionsgate on 6 November 2020, and is the final film appearance of Bob, who died in an accident six months after filming was completed.

== Synopsis ==
James looks back at the last Christmas he and Bob spent scraping a living on the streets and how Bob helped him through one of his toughest times – providing strength, friendship and inspiration – and ultimately teaching each other about the true meaning of Christmas spirit along the way.

== Cast ==
- Luke Treadaway as James Bowen, an ex-drug addict who is Bob's owner.
- Bob the Cat as himself. (This is Bob's final film appearance, as he died in a car accident in June 2020, approximately six months after filming was completed.)
  - Additional unnamed cats were used as stand-ins for Bob in some scenes.
- Anna Wilson-Jones as Arabella
- Kristina Tonteri-Young as Bea
- Nina Wadia as Anika
- Tim Plester as Leon

== Production ==
Luke Treadaway reprised his role as James Bowen.

Street Cat Bob reprised his role playing himself, but died in an accident in June 2020 (approximately six months after filming was completed). The film's end credits carry a dedication in loving memory of Bob.

Charles Martin Smith was selected to direct the film in October 2019, and filming began one month later in November 2019. Filming completed in early 2020.

=== Music ===
On 6 November 2020, an accompanying soundtrack album was released. A Christmas Gift from Bob—Original Motion Picture Soundtrack features music by Patrick Neil Doyle with songs by K.T. Wild. Three songs inspired by and written for the movie will appear in the film performed by lead actor Luke Treadaway and a fourth Coming Back To Me (Coming Home) – written and performed by K.T. himself – is played in the film's end credit.

== Release ==
Originally scheduled for a 2020 release in the United Kingdom, the release was pushed back to 2021. In October 2020, it was revealed that the film would be released in cinemas by Lionsgate UK on 6 November 2020. The film was released on DVD and Blu-ray over three weeks later, on 30 November 2020 by Lionsgate Home Entertainment.

== Reception ==
On review aggregator Rotten Tomatoes, 78% of 18 critics have given the film a positive review, with an average rating of 5.9/10.

== See also ==
- List of Christmas films
