= Marlon Bundo =

Former Bunny of the United States

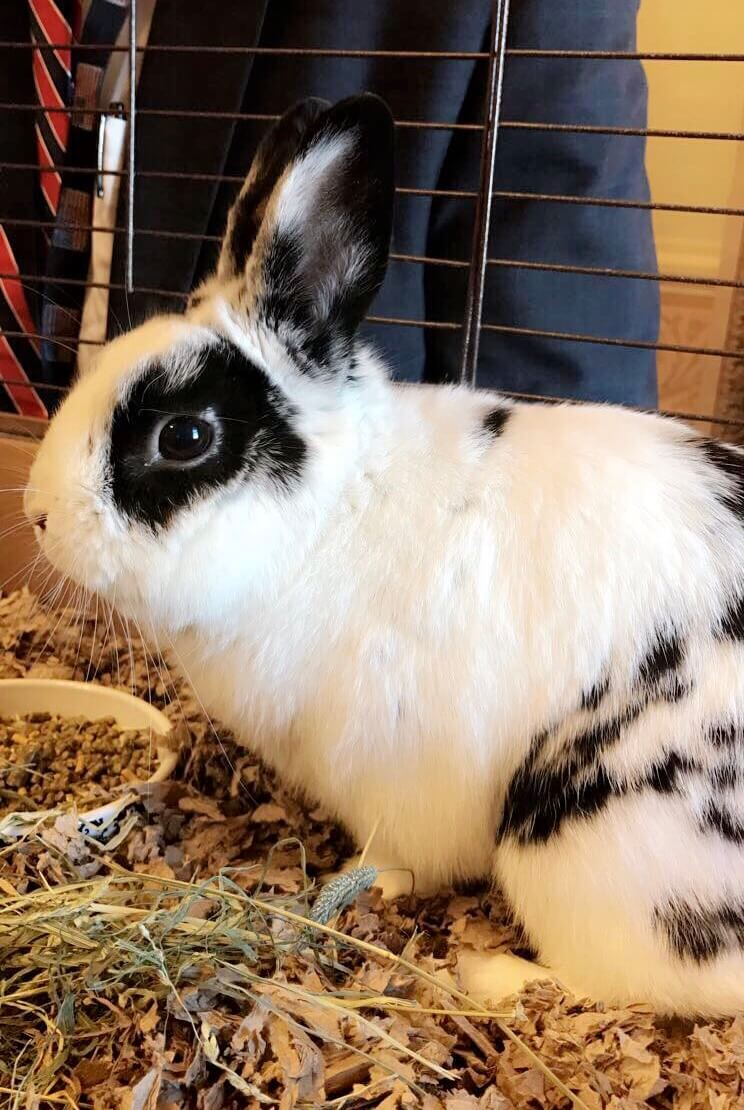
- Bundo in 2017
- Species: Domestic rabbit (Oryctolagus cuniculus domesticus)
- Sex: Male
- Born: 2012 or 2013^{:6}^{:19} Chicago, Illinois, U.S.
- Died: c. January 15, 2022 (aged 8–10)
- Known for: Pet of the Pence family
- Owners: Charlotte, Mike, and Karen Pence
- Appearance: Black and white
- Named after: Marlon Brando
- instagram.com/marlonbundo/

Marlon Bundo (2012/2013 – c. January 15, 2022), also known as Bunny of the United States (BOTUS), was a rabbit belonging to the family of Mike Pence, the 48th vice president of the United States from 2017 to 2021.

Bundo was initially adopted for a film project by Pence's daughter Charlotte Pence during her freshman year of college. His name is a pun on actor Marlon Brando, chosen after Bundo's previous owner said "Make me an offer" when Pence asked about his price. He was the first rabbit to have traveled on Air Force Two, had a popular Instagram account, and was the subject of four children's books.

== Biography ==
The rabbit Marlon Bundo was named after actor Marlon Brando and lived with the Pence family at the United States Naval Observatory from 2017 until 2021. Other pets owned by the second couple include an Australian Shepherd named Harley, and two cats named Hazel and Pickle.

Marlon Bundo was acquired via Craigslist by Pence's daughter Charlotte Pence in 2013 when she was a freshman at DePaul University. At the time she needed a rabbit for a short film student project. In the film, Bundo portrayed a "symbol of rebellion in a world of conformity" as a rabbit who repeatedly escapes from his cage. Before this, Bundo was "just another scrappy Chicago bunny".

Pence texted Bundo's owner to ask how much the rabbit cost, and the owner replied, "Make me an offer." In Mario Puzo's novel The Godfather and the 1972 film of the same name, Marlon Brando's Don Vito Corleone says, "I'm gonna make him an offer he can't refuse." Pence's friend, a Brando fan, noticed the similarity between the seller and Corleone, and suggested naming the rabbit Marlon Brando. Pence finally decided to name him Marlon Bundo. Speaking to the Chicago Tribune Charlotte recalled:

We drove out to the suburbs, my friends and I, and we picked him up. I think he was like $20. He was in the short film, and I just kept him after that.

Bundo lived with Charlotte throughout college in Chicago, for four years, and was part of a student friends group.^{:2}^{:19} Bundo traveled to Washington, D.C., from his home in Indianapolis aboard Air Force Two in January 2017, making him the first rabbit to ever travel on the plane. He made his official debut in May 2017, appearing at an event honoring Military Appreciation Month at the Eisenhower Executive Office Building, where he was "admired", according to the official transcript of the event.

Bundo was featured on the White House's Flickr landing page on May 11, 2017, detailing his first trip to the White House. Bundo did not return to the Oval Office again after March 20, 2018.^{:7} President Trump and First Lady Melania Trump met Bundo at a dinner at the Naval Observatory. Melania Trump invited Karen and Charlotte Pence to read their book at the 2018 White House Easter Egg Roll, but the Pences did not accept because they – and Marlon Bundo – were taking a "mini-spring vacation". Karen Pence said, "You have to have the bunny on Easter."

The Pence family originally drew criticism online and questions regarding their care for Bundo, based on the observation that his nails were "far too long". As Callie Beusman, a senior editor with Vice Media commented:

The Pence family cannot claim ignorance on these issues because insane rabbit people (including myself) frequently comment on Marlon Bundo's Instagrams with alarm and concern.

The piece went on to observe that "BOTUS otherwise seems well-loved". The White House press office did not respond to a related request for comment on the matter. The Washington Post later observed that Bundo "promptly got a pedicure".

=== Social media ===
Bundo had his own Instagram account, which has over 33,000 followers as of May 2019. Charlotte created his Instagram account after her father's inauguration, "not knowing if anybody would follow it". Four former U.S. presidents have had rabbits; Bundo is the first in such circles with a social media account. (Note: U.S. Presidents Abraham Lincoln, Chester A. Arthur, Theodore Roosevelt, and John F. Kennedy also owned rabbits.)

According to The Fresno Bee, Bundo generally avoided partisan politics online, preferring instead to stick to "posting pictures of his bunny life, including being hugged by his mom, Charlotte Pence, the vice president's ... daughter, hopping around the house, and playing hide and seek with Pickle, the family cat". Photographs on Bundo's Instagram account show him "reading the Constitution, taking phone calls, signing documents, and working out on the treadmill". Because of Bundo's popularity on Instagram, Charlotte and Karen decided to create a children's book about him.

Bundo's death was announced on social media by Charlotte Pence on January 15, 2022.

== Children's books ==
Bundo was the main character in four children's books.

Marlon Bundo's A Day in the Life of the Vice President features Bundo accompanying Vice President Pence through his daily activities as seen from Bundo's perspective. It is written by Charlotte Pence and illustrated by Karen Pence. Bundo posed for all illustrations in the book.^{:28} As of March 2018, Bundo was scheduled to accompany Charlotte and Karen on the press tour for the book. Proceeds from the book benefit Tracy's Kids, an art therapy program, and The A21 Campaign, which works to combat human trafficking. As of late March 2018, the book had sold approximately 100,000 copies, entered the top-ten books on Amazon, and was the No. 7 Children's Picture Book on The New York Times Best Seller list. Charlotte and Karen eventually completed a bunny trilogy with two additional books: Marlon Bundo's A Day in the Nation's Capital and Marlon Bundo's Best Christmas Ever.

A Day in the Life of Marlon Bundo is a book published by the television show Last Week Tonight with John Oliver. It was written as a parody of Marlon Bundo's A Day in the Life of the Vice President. It details a gay romance between Marlon Bundo and a rabbit named Wesley. Authorship is attributed to Bundo as well as Last Week Tonight writer Jill Twiss. In response to the release of the parody, Marlon Bundo's Instagram account made a post featuring a photo of him wearing a bow tie nearly identical to the one worn by the bunny in the book. The photograph was accompanied by comment from the account reading: "Not gonna lie, I do look pretty fly in a bow tie. The only thing better than one bunny book for charity is...TWO bunny books for charity. #BOTUS – Marlon" Proceeds from the book benefit The Trevor Project, which operates a crisis hotline for members of the LGBTQ community, and AIDS United. As of late March 2018 the book had sold approximately 400,000 copies, spent several days as the top-selling book on Amazon, and was the No. 1 Children's Picture Book on The New York Times Best Seller list.

== Reception ==
In December 2017, President Donald Trump reportedly described the presence of Bundo and the other family pets in the vice presidential residence as "low class". Writing for Jezebel, Ellie Shechet acknowledged Bundo's cuteness, but continued that it is "an indisputable fact that underneath his huge blinky eyes and nice fat tummy lies the twisted heart of a dirty trickster", and further accused him of using his "good looks and pleasant demeanor as a fluffy tool of mass obfuscation".

The Washington Post praised Bundo as "ridiculously cute" and "a natural actor". Others called him the "only positive thing in Washington, D.C." Writing in Vogue, Bridget Read summarized Bundo as "clearly a lover, not a fighter, based on how much he loves snuggling", but also that he is "clearly not new to navigating his own PR, and has demonstrated some media training". Read concluded by saying that Bundo's "social media rollout" may be an indication that he is planning to run for public office. Speaking to Ellen DeGeneres, comedian John Oliver described Bundo as a "fantastic rabbit", adding, "if you have a problem with that bunny you're dead inside".

== See also ==
- Millie's Book
- C. Fred's Story
- Dear Socks, Dear Buddy
- Rabbits and hares in art
- United States presidential pets
