= John Pence =

American attorney and businessman (born 1989)

- Born: John Edward Pence; June 13, 1989 (age 37); Columbus, Indiana, U.S.
- Education: College of William & Mary (BA); Indiana University Bloomington (JD); New York University (MBA)
- Political party: Republican
- Spouse: Giovanna Coia (m. 2019)
- Father: Greg Pence
- Relatives: Pence family

John Edward Pence (born June 13, 1989) is an American attorney, businessman and political advisor who worked as a senior political advisor for President Donald Trump. During Trump's 2016 and 2020 presidential campaigns, Pence engaged with Latino voters and advocated for Trump's policies regarding Latin America. He is the son of former Congressman Greg Pence and nephew of former Vice President Mike Pence.

== Early life and education ==
John was born in Columbus, Indiana and is the son of Greg Pence, a United States Representative for Indiana's 6th congressional district, and Denise Pence. He is the nephew of Vice President of the United States Mike Pence. Pence has three sibling and attended Columbus North High School. Pence graduated with a major in Spanish from the College of William & Mary. During his college career, Pence studied abroad at the National University of La Plata in Argentina, where he observed President of Venezuela Hugo Chávez receive an award and attack the United States while students applauded him. Pence later spent time teaching the English language in Nicaragua under President of Nicaragua Daniel Ortega. After these experiences, Pence said that he witnessed socialism ruining Latin America. Pence later obtained a Juris Doctor from the Indiana University Maurer School of Law and a Master of Business Administration from New York University Stern School of Business.

== Career ==
In August 2016, Pence began working for the Donald Trump 2016 presidential campaign. During the presidency of Donald Trump, Pence worked as the deputy executive director of Trump's 2020 presidential campaign. While serving in the position, the Republican National Committee (RNC) paid $37,000 a month to rent an office in Trump Tower for Pence according to CNBC. CNBC also reported that Pence was paid $12,000 per month by the Trump campaign and an additional $12,000 monthly by the RNC. David Bossie and Corey Lewandowski in their book Let Trump Be Trump write that Pence was responsible for the "crowd-building process" and sophistication of Trump's campaign. According to Trump staffer Omarosa Manigault Newman, Pence was credited for the chants heard during Trump rallies, with the former staffer saying that he organized section leaders at events to initiate certain chants. Mother Jones noted that Pence was instrumental for building the support of conservative Latinos during the 2020 campaign, highlighting his ability to speak Spanish while also noting Pence's background in Argentina and Nicaragua. The Trump campaign referred to Pence as "Juan Pence" due to his many Spanish-language videos on social media according to Mike C. Bender's book Frankly, We Did Win This Election: The Inside Story of How Trump Lost. During the first impeachment of Donald Trump, Pence met with Latinos for Trump to defend and promote the president's campaign. He also was one of the main advocates for regime change against President Nicolás Maduro, promoting the Trump administration's involvement in the Venezuelan presidential crisis and its support for Juan Guaidó. Pence signed the Madrid Charter, a document drafted by the right-wing Spanish party Vox that describes left-wing groups as enemies of Ibero-America involved in a "criminal project" that are "under the umbrella of the Cuban regime". In September 2021, Pence was named CEO of ACE Specialties, an American company based in Lafayette, Louisiana that markets merchandise and assists with fundraising for conservative political candidates. John was an attorney at the law firm of Ice Miller LLP, which is one of Indiana's oldest law firms founded in 1910. On January 6, 2025, he launched Frontline Government Relations with Trump 2024 Senior Advisor Michael Glassner. John is also the founder of the DC-based law firm Pence Law Group.

== Political positions ==
Pence is a member of the Republican Party. He has been described as having a "populist appeal" with skillful public speaking abilities by the Carroll Daily Times Herald. The Daily Herald Times also wrote that Pence described the Democratic Party as wanting to control Americans lives instead of promoting freedom, with Pence saying that John F. Kennedy would be a Republican in the present day citing Kennedy's "Ask not what your country can do for you" quote, stating the Democratic Party was "not about doing the selfless work". Pence supports free markets, limited government and federalism as outlined in multiple opinion pieces for Fox News.

== Personal life ==
Pence married Giovanna Coia, the cousin of Trump aide Kellyanne Conway, on September 14, 2019, in Atlantic City, New Jersey at the St. Nicholas of Tolentine Church in a ceremony monitored by local law enforcement and the United States Secret Service.

John and Giovanna have three small children, two sons and a daughter. They live in the Washington, D.C. area.
