= Luke Treadaway =

British actor (born 1984)

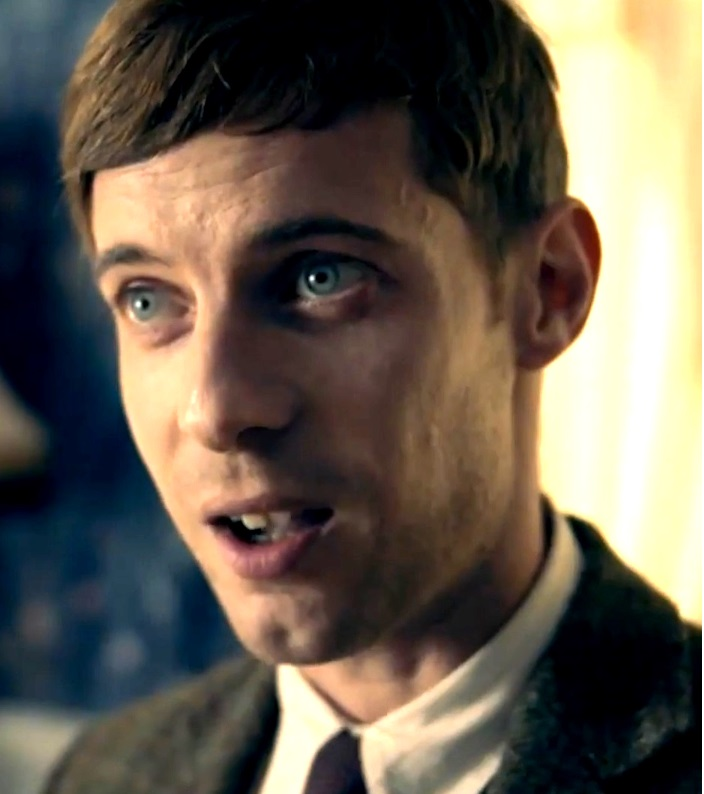
- Treadaway in Ordeal by Innocence 2018
- Born: Luke Antony Newman Treadaway; 10 September 1984 (age 41); Exeter, Devon, England
- Education: London Academy of Music and Dramatic Art
- Occupation: Actor
- Years active: 2005–present
- Relatives: Harry Treadaway (twin brother)

Luke Antony Newman Treadaway (born 10 September 1984) is an English actor. He won the Laurence Olivier Award for Best Actor from the National Theatre's production of The Curious Incident of the Dog in the Night-Time in 2013.

His screen credits include Brothers of the Head (2005), The Innocence Project (2006-2007), Clapham Junction (2007), Heartless (2009), Clash of the Titans (2010), Late Bloomers (2011), The Rise (2012), Attack the Block (2011), St George's Day (2012), 13 Steps Down (2012), Get Lucky (2013), Unbroken (2014), The Rack Pack (2016), The Hollow Crown Episode: "Richard III" (2016), Ordeal by Innocence (2018), Urban Myths (2018), Traitors (2019), The Singapore Grip (2020), Lockwood & Co. (2023), and The Serial Killer's Wife (2024).

== Early life ==
Born at the Royal Devon and Exeter Hospital in Exeter, Treadaway was brought up in Sandford, Devon. His father is an architect and his mother a primary school teacher.

His first acting role was playing a daffodil in the village Christmas pantomime Little Red Riding Hood; his father was the Big Bad Wolf in the same production. Luke and his twin brother Harry attended Queen Elizabeth's Community College in Crediton, where he played scrum half in the twice Devon-Cup-winning rugby union team.

Inspired by a love of Eddie Vedder and with support from their secondary school drama teacher, Phil Gasson, Luke and Harry formed a band called Lizardsun with Matt Conyngham and Seth Campbell. They also both joined the National Youth Theatre, for whom Luke played Prince Ivan in The Firebird. He was also in the ensemble for a production of Murder in the Cathedral.

He graduated from the London Academy of Music and Dramatic Art in 2006.

== Career ==
While still at drama school, Treadaway and his twin brother recorded roles in their first feature film, Brothers of the Head (2005), in which they played conjoined twins in a band. During rehearsals and throughout the shoot, Luke and Harry were connected to each other for fifteen hours a day, wearing sewn-together wet suits or a harness. They also slept in one bed to simulate the conjoined nature of their characters. The Treadaways performed all tracks featured in the film themselves live on stage as well as recording nine tracks for the soundtrack album.

He played a series lead in The Innocence Project for BBC television. He also appeared as a 14-year-old Theo in the hard-hitting Channel 4 drama Clapham Junction. He made his stage debut in Saint Joan at the Royal National Theatre, followed by playing Albert in the original production of War Horse at the same venue. In 2008 he appeared in Piranha Heights, a new play by Philip Ridley, at the Soho Theatre, and in Cradle Me, a new play by Simon Vinnicombe, at the Finborough Theatre. He played Allan in Amanda Dalton's adaptation of Das Cabinet des Dr Caligari (as Caligari) on Radio 3 and Albert in John Tams' adaptation of War Horse for BBC Radio 2 on 8 November 2008. In 2009 he appeared in the play Over There at the Royal Court Theatre alongside his twin brother from 25 February to 21 March. He spent November 2009 in Romania with Rachel Weisz, Vanessa Redgrave and Monica Bellucci, filming The Whistleblower (2009).

He played Prokopion in the 2010 film Clash of the Titans. He played Lee in Philip Ridley's Heartless, also starring Jim Sturgess and Noel Clarke, released in May 2010. He appeared in Killing Bono, starring Ben Barnes and Pete Postlethwaite. He also had a leading role in the independent Scottish film You Instead, which was filmed at T in the Park 2010. In 2011 he played the eponymous hero of The History of Titus Groan, a cycle of six BBC Radio 4 dramas based on the books of Mervyn Peake dramatised by Brian Sibley. He also filmed Late Bloomers with William Hurt and Isabella Rossellini. He also starred in Attack the Block, a Film Four production, alongside John Boyega, Nick Frost and Jodie Whittaker. He also directed a music video for girl band Boxettes, whose lead singer Bellatrix comes from Sandford. In 2012 Treadway starred in Cheerful Weather for the Wedding, the ITV adaptation of the Ruth Rendell thriller Thirteen Steps Down, and the National Theatre's adaptation of Mark Haddon's novel The Curious Incident of the Dog in the Night-Time – of which the 6 September 2012 performance was broadcast live to open the fourth season of National Theatre Live. On 28 April 2013 Treadaway won the Laurence Olivier Award for Best Actor for his performance in The Curious Incident of the Dog in the Night-Time, which by winning seven Oliviers equalled Matilda the Musical's record win in 2012.

He Starred in Horror Thriller Fortitude between 2015 and 2018. In April 2018, he played the part of Dr Arthur Calgary in a BBC One three-part adaptation of the Agatha Christie novel Ordeal by Innocence.

== Personal life ==
Treadaway is the twin brother of the actor Harry Treadaway.

== Acting credits ==
=== Film ===
Year	Title	Role	Notes	Ref.
2005	Brothers of the Head	Barry Howe		
2007	God's Wounds	Mark	Short film	
2008	Scratch	Sol	Short film	
2009	Dogging: A Love Story	Dan		
2009	Viko	Viko	Short film	
2009	Heartless	Lee Morgan		
2010	Clash of the Titans	Prokopion		
2010	Alice	White Rabbit	Short film	
2010	The Whistleblower	Jim Higgins		
2010	Over There	Karl		
2011	Late Bloomers	Benjamin		
2011	You Instead	Adam		
2011	Attack the Block	Brewis		
2011	Killing Bono	Rick		
2011	Man in Fear	Anthony Fox	Short film	
2012	Cheerful Weather for the Wedding	Joseph		
2012	The Rise	Harvey Miller		
2012	St George's Day	William Bishop		
2013	Get Lucky	Lucky		
2014	Unbroken	Miller		
2015	The Magi		Short film	
2016	The Rack Pack	Alex Higgins		
2016	Ethel & Ernest	Raymond Briggs	Voice role	
2016	A Street Cat Named Bob	James Bowen		
2017	National Theatre Live: Who's Afraid of Virginia Woolf?	Nick		
2017	The Dying Hours	Jack	Short film	
2020	A Gift from Bob	James Bowen		

=== Television ===
Year	Title	Role	Notes	Ref.
2006–2007	The Innocence Project	Adam Solomons	Main cast	
2007	Clapham Junction	Theo	TV movie	
2008–2009	Mist: Sheepdog Tales	Eddie	Recurring role (seasons 2–3), voice role	
2012	National Theatre Live: The Curious Incident of the Dog in the Night-Time	Christopher John Francis Boone	TV movie	
2012	13 Steps Down	Mix Cellini	Main cast, miniseries	
2015	Vicious	Young Freddie	Episode: "Flatmates"	
2015–2018	Fortitude	Vincent Rattrey	Main cast	
2016	The Nightmare Worlds of H. G. Wells	Edward Eden	Episode: "The Late Mr. Elvesham"	
2016	The Hollow Crown	Henry Tudor, Earl of Richmond	Episode: "Richard III"	
2017	Unspeakable	Danny	TV movie	
2018	Ordeal by Innocence	Dr. Arthur Calgary	Main cast, miniseries	
2018	Urban Myths	David Jones	Episode: "When Bowie Met Bolan"	
2019	Traitors	Hugh Fenton	Main cast, miniseries	
2020	The Singapore Grip	Matthew Webb	Main cast, miniseries	
2023	Lockwood & Co.	The Golden Blade	3 episodes	
2024	The Serial Killer's Wife	Adam Plummer	Main cast, miniseries	

=== Theatre ===
Year	Title	Role	Venue	Ref.
2007	Saint Joan	Page	Royal National Theatre, London	
2007	War Horse	Albert Narracott	Royal National Theatre, London	
2008	Piranha Heights	Garth	Soho Theatre, London	
2008	Cradle Me	Daniel	Finborough Theatre, London	
2009	Over There	Karl	Royal Court Theatre, London	
2012	The Curious Incident of the Dog in the Night-Time	Christopher John Francis Boone	Royal National Theatre, London	
2017	Who's Afraid of Virginia Woolf?	Nick	Harold Pinter Theatre, London	
2022	Oresteia	Orestes	Park Avenue Armory, New York City	
2022	Hamlet	Laertes	Park Avenue Armory, New York City	
2024	Cabaret	Emcee	Playhouse Theatre, London	

=== Music videos ===
Year	Title	Artist	Ref.
2010	"For the First Time"	The Script	
2010	"Champion Sound"	Crystal Fighters	
2013	"Puppet on a String"	The Boxettes	

== Awards and nominations ==
Year	Award	Category	Nominated work	Result	Ref.
2006	British Independent Film Awards	Most Promising Newcomer (with Harry Treadaway)	Brothers of the Head	Nominated	
2012	Black Reel Awards	Outstanding Ensemble (with John Boyega, Alex Esmail, Nick Frost, Nina Gold, Simon Howard, Leeon Jones, Maggie McCarthy, Danielle Vitalis & Jodie Whittaker)	Attack the Block	Nominated	
2013	Laurence Olivier Awards	Best Actor	The Curious Incident of the Dog in the Night-Time	Won	
2013	WhatsOnStage Awards	Best Actor in a Play	The Curious Incident of the Dog in the Night-Time	Nominated	
