= A Day in the Life of Marlon Bundo =

2018 children's book by Jill Twiss and EG Keller

- Author: Jill Twiss
- Audio read by: Jim Parsons, Jesse Tyler Ferguson, Jeff Garlin, Ellie Kemper, John Lithgow, Jack McBrayer, RuPaul
- Illustrator: EG Keller
- Cover artist: EG Keller
- Language: English
- Publisher: Chronicle Books (Book), Partially Important Productions (Audiobook)
- Publication date: March 18, 2018
- Publication place: United States
- Pages: 40
- ISBN: 145217380X
- Website: betterbundobook.com focusonthefurmily.com

A Day in the Life of Marlon Bundo is a 2018 children's book written by Jill Twiss and illustrated by EG Keller (a pseudonym of Gerald Kelley). The book is about a fictional day in the life of Marlon Bundo, the real-life pet rabbit of then-Vice President of the United States Mike Pence, and details the same-sex romance between Marlon Bundo and another rabbit named Wesley. It is a loose parody of Marlon Bundo's A Day in the Life of the Vice President, another children's book featuring Marlon Bundo written by Charlotte Pence and illustrated by Karen Pence.

The book and its LGBTQ-inclusive theme was written by Jill Twiss (with Marlon Bundo credited as co-writer), who is a comedy writer for the television show Last Week Tonight with John Oliver, aiming to deride then-Vice President Pence over his controversial anti-LGBTQ views, such as his alleged support for gay conversion therapy and opposition to same-sex marriage. It was released on March 18, 2018, one day before the release of Marlon Bundo's A Day in the Life of the Vice President. The audiobook version features Jim Parsons, Jesse Tyler Ferguson, Jeff Garlin, Ellie Kemper, John Lithgow, Jack McBrayer, and RuPaul.

On the day of release, John Oliver promoted the book on Last Week Tonight at the conclusion of an episode mainly dedicated to Pence and his positions on LGBTQ issues; it became a bestseller and the No. 1 book and e-book on Amazon the following day. Oliver announced profits from the book were to be donated to The Trevor Project and AIDS United.

== Background ==
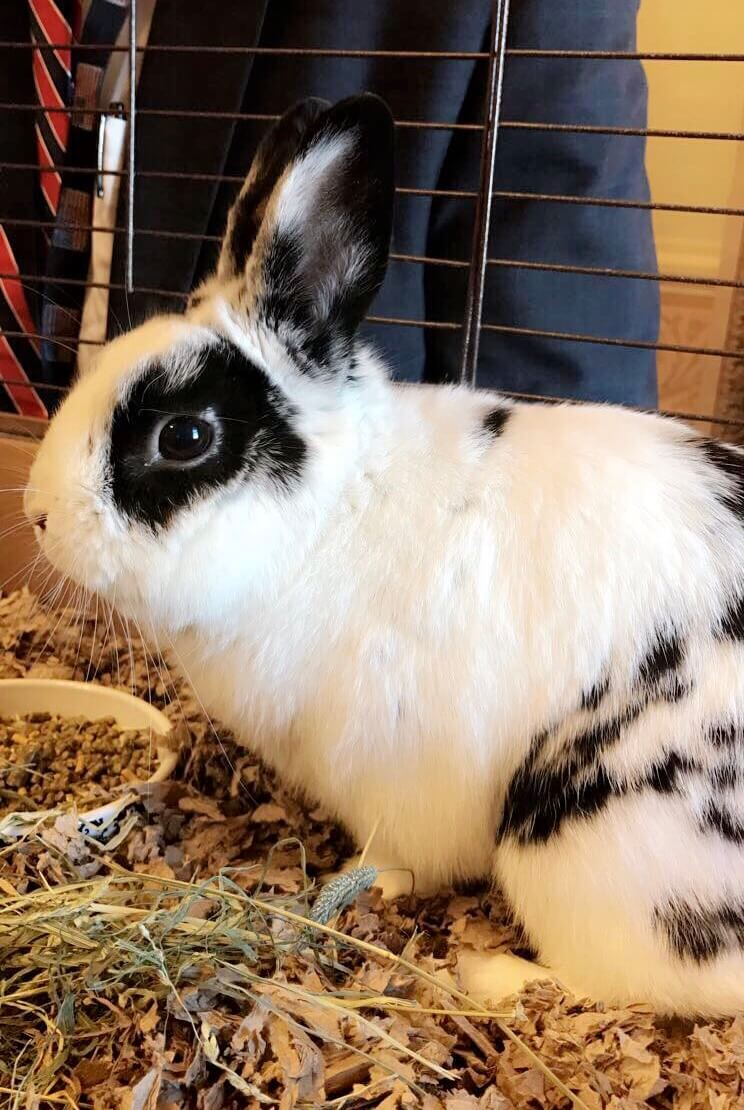
Marlon Bundo, the Pence family's pet rabbit

A Day in the Life of Marlon Bundo was conceptualized as a loose parody of Marlon Bundo's A Day in the Life of the Vice President, a children's book written by Mike Pence's daughter Charlotte Pence and illustrated by his wife Karen Pence. Writer Jill Twiss stated she became interested in Bundo due to his name, and once she learned about the upcoming book she stated, "we thought we could use the opportunity to support some really great charities while also hopefully putting out an inclusive, loving children's book in the process". Helped by input from the writing staff of Last Week Tonight, Twiss' work was done in a few months, faster than the normal picture book process.

Oliver acquired two domain names to promote A Day in the Life of Marlon Bundo. According to Oliver, the domain betterbundobook.com contrasts the book with the Pence-family-written Bundo book and focusonthefurmily.com satirizes the anti-LGBTQ organization Focus on the Family. In a broadcast on March 18, 2018, Oliver said that aside from sending an inclusive message, he was hoping to annoy Pence over the competition for his family's book and the fact that Last Week Tonight is donating all proceeds of its book to LGBTQ-friendly organizations (The Trevor Project and AIDS United).

== Plot ==
Marlon Bundo, a black-and-white rabbit sporting a colorful bow tie, lives in the home of "Grampa", former Vice President Mike Pence. Marlon is lonely, but one morning after breakfast, he meets Wesley, a bespectacled brown rabbit. They spend the day together, hopping around in the garden and the house. They decide to get married, because they never want to hop without each other again.

Marlon and Wesley tell their animal friends, who respond enthusiastically. But the stink bug, who is "In Charge and Important", yells at them that boy rabbits can only marry girl rabbits. He calls them different, and he says that different is bad. The other animals speak up and tell him how each of them is different in their own way. They decide to vote on who is "In Charge and Important", and the stink bug is voted out. Marlon and Wesley have their wedding, with their friends in attendance. They go to sleep in anticipation of their "bunnymoon". Marlon is no longer lonely.

== Analysis ==
A Day in the Life of Marlon Bundo is meant to be an actual children's story rather than a direct parody of the Pences' book, the publisher calling it a "better Bundo book". Oliver and his team wanted to mock the Vice President, but they also wanted to create a book that has "something very genuinely for children", according to Twiss. Twiss added that she hoped the book would resonate with children "feeling out of place or having a family that looks different than that of their friends," and that the main message was "different is special". It nevertheless contains some stabs at Mike Pence, with the Marlon Bundo character claiming that Pence "isn't very fun" and a stink bug character with a resemblance to Mike Pence. Twiss said in an interview that her ambition for the book was to make a heartfelt story and also to annoy Pence.

== Publication ==
A Day in the Life of Marlon Bundo was published on March 18, 2018, the day of the Last Week Tonight broadcast about Pence. The publication of both books was used as a comedy piece in the broadcast to raise awareness of Mike Pence's stated anti-LGBTQ attitudes. John Oliver stated that Pence's pet rabbit was the one thing he liked about Pence, and that because of this, he had taken issue with the real-life Marlon Bundo having to make a stop at the anti-LGBTQ organization Focus on the Family during an upcoming promotional book tour with the Pences.

The day of publication was intentionally the day before the publication of the Pences' book. One day after its release, the book overtook James Comey's book A Higher Loyalty: Truth, Lies, and Leadership to become the No. 1 book on Amazon. For 26 non-consecutive weeks, A Day in the Life of Marlon Bundo was on The New York Times Children's Picture Books Bestsellers list, becoming No. 1 the week of July 15, 2018. It also topped the e-book sales, thus making the two versions of the book No. 1 and No. 2 on overall Amazon book sales, with the printed edition selling the most of the two. A Day in the Life of Marlon Bundo sold much better than the Pence book it parodied, which climbed to No. 4 in the week after publication. In the first two days, 180,000 copies were sold.

Last Week Tonight had not anticipated a large demand and the printed version sold out after two days, with Twiss later saying in an interview that she "never thought it would actually get published". While it was being reprinted, it remained possible to order the book on Amazon and it continued to be available as an e-book version for Amazon Kindle and its various platforms. Within the first week of release, the audiobook version with voice acting from Jim Parsons, Jesse Tyler Ferguson, Jeff Garlin, Ellie Kemper, John Lithgow, Jack McBrayer and RuPaul was No. 1 on audiobook service Audible. On March 28, publisher Chronicle Books reported to have over 400,000 copies in print. Independent booksellers expressed disappointment with Chronicle Books for making it exclusively available via Amazon at release, rather than also supplying it to other retailers at the launch.

== Reception ==
=== Public response ===
The publication caused large numbers of positive reviews and comments on Amazon, though only about a quarter of the reviews were left by actual buyers of the book. News about the book and the controversy it stirred up was picked up by mainstream news outlets and talk shows in the U.S. In a segment about the book on The Ellen DeGeneres Show, Ellen DeGeneres praised it and presented John Oliver with a $10,000 check from HBO for The Trevor Project, calling on her viewers to buy the book in support of the project. Will & Grace creator Max Mutchnick donated a copy of the book to every elementary school in Indiana, saying he wanted to counter Pence's "message of intolerance" about gay people, hoping to "provide positive role models and a story of inclusion for children in Pence's home state".

According to the American Library Association, the book was the 19th most banned and challenged book in the United States between 2010 and 2019, meaning it was requested for removal from various library collections on several occasions. The book ranked in the Top Ten Most Challenged Books in 2018 (2nd) and 2019 (3rd). The book was challenged due to its LGBTQ content, for allegedly being "designed to pollute the morals of its readers," for concerns that it was sexually explicit and biased, as well as its political and religious viewpoints. Following passage of the Parental Rights in Education (Don't Say Gay) law in Florida, Broward County Schools banned Bundo after complaints by conservative parents.

=== Reactions ===
Charlotte Pence, Mike Pence's daughter and the author of Marlon Bundo's A Day in the Life of the Vice President, supported A Day in the Life of Marlon Bundo. She posted on Twitter a picture of herself and the real-life Marlon Bundo wearing a bow tie identical to the one in Jill Twiss' book and said in a television interview: "His book is contributing to charities that I think we can all get behind... I'm all for it". The official Instagram account of Marlon Bundo also spoke of Twiss' book in a positive light, stating "Not gonna lie, I do look pretty fly in a bow tie. The only thing better than one bunny book for charity is...TWO bunny books for charity". The proceeds from the Pences' book were also given to charities, namely The A21 Campaign which works to fight human trafficking and Tracy's Kids, an art therapy program for hospitalized children.

President of Focus on the Family Jim Daly called Oliver's treatment of the Pences' book "not just vicious in tone, but also vulgar and vile in every sense of the word and way". Regnery Publishing, the conservative book publisher who published the Pence book, initially criticized the release of A Day in the Life of Marlon Bundo, saying that it was "unfortunate that anyone would feel the need to ridicule an educational children's book and turn it into something controversial and partisan". When the success of both books became apparent, publisher Marji Ross of Regnery congratulated Oliver and Chronicle Books with their sales figures, stating: "There's plenty to go around for everyone and, like Charlotte [Pence] said, we can all be happy the proceeds are going to a good cause".

=== Critical reviews ===
Common Sense Media gave the book a four-star rating and considers it appropriate for children of four years and older, giving it its highest marks for "positive messages" and "positive role models and representations". Susie Wilde of The News & Observer said that Twiss "understands how to tell a simple story with comic touches and pacing, creating a parody that children might actually enjoy", while Keller's "details are playful and give a strong sense of motion, which works well for the two rabbit heroes who never want to hop without each other". Katy Waldman in The New Yorker called the book "full of the attentive details and poetic grace notes that distinguish good children's books", while noting its "subtextual treats for adults". Kirkus Reviews calls the book "another tiresome political picture book", that really just aims at older people and not for the age the book was supposed to be for. The review also notes that the book is good for a little laughter but not for a message intended for inclusion. Contrarily, The Globe and Mail's Anna Fitzpatrick wrote that "while an unabashed political parody, it also stands on its own as a children's book".

== See also ==
- Whose Boat Is This Boat?, a satirical children's book produced by The Late Show With Stephen Colbert
