= Mercy-Man =

Tajikistani comic book series

Publication information
- First appearance: Mercy-Man #1 (August 2018)
- Created by: Jaihun "James" Nashimi

In-story information
- Alter ego: Jahongir / Jahon
- Species: Human
- Place of origin: United States
- Abilities: Superhuman senses; Flight

Mercy-Man (Tajik: Марди меҳрубон; Russian: Человек-милосердие) is a Tajikistani comic book series by Jaihun "James" Nashimi (Tajik: Джеймс Насими). Mercy-Man is Tajikistan's first superhero and was published on August 30, 2018.

== Plot ==
Jahongir better known as Jahon was a Tajikistani boy (with a mental condition) who was adopted by American parents after his grandparents death. Little did he know, his mental condition would later turn into superpowers. He later becomes Mercy-Man. He builds a robot. However, Ken Richter (Tajik: Кэн Рихтер) uses the robot for world domination. Mercy-Man has to fight corrupt organizations back.
