= Charlotte Pence Bond =

American writer (born 1993)

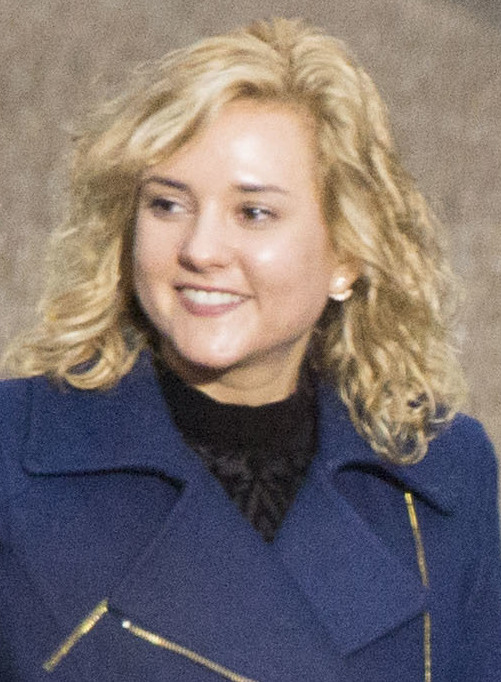
- Pence in 2017
- Born: Charlotte Rose Pence; June 25, 1993 (age 33); Columbus, Indiana, U.S.
- Education: DePaul University (BA); Harvard University (MTS)
- Occupation: Writer
- Political party: Republican
- Spouse: Henry Bond (m. 2019)
- Children: 2
- Parents: Mike Pence (father); Karen Pence (mother)
- Relatives: Pence family

Charlotte Rose Pence Bond (née Pence; June 25, 1993) is an American writer. She is the second child and elder daughter of former vice president of the United States Mike Pence and former second lady of the United States Karen Pence.

Pence graduated from DePaul University. She wrote articles for The DePaulia, Thought Catalog and Glamour, fiction articles for The Isis Magazine, and poems for an Oxford student-run blog, Seven Voices. Pence did film production internships while in college, and won a 2014 Emmy Award for the Lower Great Lakes region for a film she co-wrote and for which she was an associate producer.

She is the author of children's book Marlon Bundo's A Day in the Life of the Vice President, published in 2018. As of 2022, she is a contributor to the conservative news website The Daily Wire.

== Early life and education ==
Pence grew up with her parents and siblings in Columbus, Indiana. Her father Mike encouraged her to be a writer and "cherished" a biography she wrote of him when she was 7. Her mother Karen said that she was a storyteller since she could talk.^{:1} Pence described her family as "very, very close" and said that "‍[they] talk about everything together". She said that she and her siblings could choose how involved in politics they would be; Pence told Ben Shapiro in an interview in 2018 that as children they could be included in an event only if they wanted to. She said that they have political debates in their house and on the phone.^{:1}^{:31}

Pence spent her junior year at DePaul University studying a semester in English and Philosophy abroad at St Catherine's College, Oxford. At DePaul, Pence was involved with the school ministry, a student group that addresses violence in Chicago, and creative writing and film communities; she worked on documentary projects, one of which won nine regional Emmy Awards, and joined the Chi Omega sorority. She graduated with a double major in Digital Cinema – Screenwriting, and English – Creative Writing from DePaul University College of Computing and Digital Media in June 2016. In September 2020, Pence was attending her second year at the Harvard Divinity School, for a master's degree.

== Career ==
Pence did film production internships while in college. In 2013, she interned at WFYI, a public broadcasting station in central Indiana, working in the television production department. Pence was the associate producer and co-writer of the 2013 documentary film Fleeced: Speaking Out Against Senior Financial Abuse, which highlights "the stories of seniors who have been scammed by financial predators". The film won a 2014 Emmy award for the Lower Great Lakes region. Pence has since worked on several documentary and short film projects. She said in 2016 that she "‍[wanted] to go into the creative side of film production, looking at stories and books and scripts and real life stories and taking those to the screen". Pence's biography for the documentary film For the Records states, "She hopes to pursue a career in writing for film and documentaries after college."

Pence is a writer and has published poems, short stories and articles. In 2014, she wrote an article for Thought Catalog about her religious beliefs. In 2015, Pence wrote a column for DePaul University's The DePaulia about her studying abroad at Oxford University. In it, she talks about "finding a running path and learning to navigate the pubs". Also in 2015, Pence published several poems for the Oxford student blog Seven Voices and fiction pieces for The Isis Magazine, an independent UK student magazine. She wrote an essay for Glamour that was released Tuesday ahead of her father's prime time debate as the Republican vice presidential candidate of the 2016 Donald Trump presidential campaign. In the essay, Pence wrote about the lessons she had learned from her father. She described her lifestyle changes after her father became Trump's running mate in July, writing, "I went from taking public transit in Chicago to riding in a presidential motorcade in the span of just a few months."

External videos
- After Words interview with Pence on her book Where You Go: Life Lessons From My Father, November 3, 2018, C-SPAN

Beginning in early August 2016, Pence started travelling around the U.S. with her father on his campaign trail, which included the 2016 Republican National Convention in Cleveland, Ohio. Pence's recent graduation gave her time to travel the country and she joked that her role on the campaign trail was to "babysit her parents". Charlotte said that she was the only one of her siblings to be home at the time of the nomination.^{:1} Pence described herself politically as "more of a moderate or independent" and said that she does not always agree with the policies of her father and Trump, adding "I think I have views that go across the board", which she says has been encouraged by her parents. In 2018, Pence said that her father tells her, regarding the public criticism and protests against him, "That's what freedom looks like."^{:29}

Since the inauguration, Pence helped provide a "support system for her parents", without taking official roles, while working full-time in Washington, D.C. at a film production company. In September 2017, Pence started an agent training program at the United Talent Agency.

=== Marlon Bundo ===
In 2013, Pence needed a rabbit for a short film project as a freshman at DePaul, and she bought a black and white rabbit from Craigslist. Pence named the rabbit 'Marlon Bundo' after Marlon Brando, as Pence's friend noticed the similarity between Brando's phrase "I'm gonna make him an offer he can't refuse" from The Godfather and the rabbit's seller's response "Make me an offer" to a message about the price. Speaking to the Chicago Tribune she recalled: "We drove out to the suburbs, my friends and I, and we picked him up. I think he was like $20. He was in the short film, and I just kept him after that." Bundo lived with Pence throughout college for four years, and continued to live with the Pences at Number One Observatory Circle afterwards.^{:2} Pence created an Instagram account for Bundo "right after [her] dad was inaugurated [Vice President]", "not knowing if anybody would follow it". Pence and her mother thought about creating a children's book, following Bundo's popularity on Instagram and because Karen is a watercolor painter. Pence told The Denver Post that she "really [likes] children's literature and middle-grade fiction" and had "always wanted to be a writer". Pence told Andrew Klavan in a 2018 interview that she could also write non-fiction and write for adults.^{:35}

On March 19, 2018, the children's picture book Marlon Bundo's A Day in the Life of the Vice President was released. It was written by Charlotte and illustrated by Karen. The picture book tells the story of Bundo observing the Vice President's daily activities. Pence said that they'd "love to do something for a sequel". Proceeds from the picture book go to benefit art therapy programs, and The A21 Campaign, which works to combat human trafficking; Charlotte Pence picked the latter charity because of her prior experience with the organization.

As a "jab" at Mike Pence's opposition to LGBT rights in the United States, a parody of the picture book titled A Day in the Life of Marlon Bundo, authored by Last Week Tonight with John Oliver's comedy writer Jill Twiss and illustrated by Gerald Kelley, was published by Chronicle Books a day before. In the parody book, Bundo falls in love with a rabbit named Wesley, but a stink bug resembling Mike Pence decrees that male rabbits cannot marry each other. Proceeds from the parody book go to benefit The Trevor Project, which runs a crisis hotline for members of the LGBTQ community, and AIDS United. The picture book and the parody book reached the fourth and the first spot, respectively, on Amazon's best-selling books list. As of late March 2018, Pence's book and Twiss's book sold approximately 100,000 and 400,000 copies, respectively, and were respectively No. 5 and No. 6 Children's Picture Books on The New York Times Best Seller list. Pence reacted positively to the parody book, saying:

I think imitation is the most sincere form of flattery in a way. But in all seriousness, his book is contributing to charities that I think we can all get behind. We have two books that are giving to charities that are both about bunnies, so I'm all for it, really.

== Personal life ==
Pence became engaged to Navy lieutenant Henry Bond in July 2019, and they married in December that same year. Their daughter was born in February 2023. Their son was born in October 2024.
