= Jill Twiss =

American writer

Jill Twiss is an American writer best known for her work on the HBO show Last Week Tonight with John Oliver. She is a senior writer on the show and she portrays its "Janice from Accounting" character. She authored a children's book called A Day in the Life of Marlon Bundo about a fictional day in the life of Marlon Bundo (Vice President Mike Pence's pet rabbit), as part of a Last Week Tonight sketch, which went on to be a best seller.

== Early life ==
She was born in Redmond, Oregon, and grew up in six different U.S. states due to her father's reassignments as part of the U.S. Forest Service. While Twiss was studying public policy and music in the College of William & Mary, her parents moved to Custer, South Dakota, and there she got interested in theater. After graduating in 1998, Twiss performed at the Black Hills Playhouse during the 1999 and 2000 seasons. After graduating, Twiss got accepted into a law school in New York City, but instead joined a touring children's theater troupe, and only moved to New York in 2001 with hopes of furthering her acting career.

== Career ==
While doing acting and stand-up comedy gigs in New York, Twiss sought writing jobs. As she learned about HBO preparing Last Week Tonight with John Oliver and recruiting writers through blind auditions, Twiss sent them sample segments, which in turn led to a demand for a second batch, and after an interview with John Oliver himself she was hired.

As a member of the writing staff for Last Week Tonight, Twiss has won the Primetime Emmy Award for Outstanding Writing for a Variety Series multiple times.

=== A Day in the Life of Marlon Bundo ===
In March 2018, as a writer on Last Week Tonight, Twiss authored a children's book called A Day in the Life of Marlon Bundo about a fictional day in the life of Marlon Bundo, the real-life pet rabbit of the Vice President of the United States, Mike Pence. The story details the same-sex romance between Marlon Bundo and another rabbit named Wesley. It was written in response to Pence's staunch opposition to same-sex marriage and support of conversion therapy advocate James Dobson.

Twiss conceptualized the book as a loose parody of Marlon Bundo's: A Day in the Life of the Vice President, written by Charlotte Pence and illustrated by Karen Pence (Mike Pence's daughter and wife, respectively). Their book also tells about a fictionalized day of the Pence family's pet rabbit, but without the LGBT themes. Rather than a straight-up parody of the Pences' book, A Day in the Life of Marlon Bundo is an actual children's story about marriage equality and democracy. It nevertheless contains some stabs at Mike Pence.

On the day of release, John Oliver promoted the book on Last Week Tonight at the conclusion of an episode mainly dedicated to Pence and his positions on LGBT issues; it became a bestseller and the #1 book and e-book on Amazon the following day, receiving notable praise and selling much better than the crew of Last Week Tonight had expected. All profits from the book are being donated to The Trevor Project and AIDS United.

=== The Someone New ===
Twiss authored The Someone New, which was subsequently published in June 2018. The story revolves around Jitterbug, a chipmunk fearful of change. When a snail named Pudding moves into the woods, Jitterbug learns to overcome her fear with the help of her animal-friends.

As part of the books premise of practicing kindness for strangers, Twiss partnered with the charity KIND (Kids in Need of Defense) on her book, and both she and her publisher, HarperCollins made donations to the charity.

Twiss and the book's illustrator EG Keller released a second book about voting through the publisher HarperCollins called "Everyone Gets a Say" on August 25th 2020.

== Awards and nominations ==
Year	Award	Nominated work	Result
2014	Peabody Award	Last Week Tonight with John Oliver	Won
2015	67th Primetime Emmy Awards: Outstanding Writing for a Variety Series	Last Week Tonight with John Oliver	Nominated
2015	Writers Guild of America Awards 2014: Comedy/Variety (including Talk) - Series	Last Week Tonight with John Oliver	Won
2016	68th Primetime Emmy Awards: Outstanding Writing for a Variety Series	Last Week Tonight with John Oliver	Won
2017	69th Primetime Emmy Awards: Outstanding Writing for a Variety Series	Last Week Tonight with John Oliver	Won
2017	Writers Guild of America Awards 2016: Comedy/Variety (including Talk) - Series	Last Week Tonight with John Oliver	Won
2018	Writers Guild of America Awards 2017: Comedy/Variety - Talk Series	Last Week Tonight with John Oliver	Won
