= James Bowen (author) =

English author (born 1979)

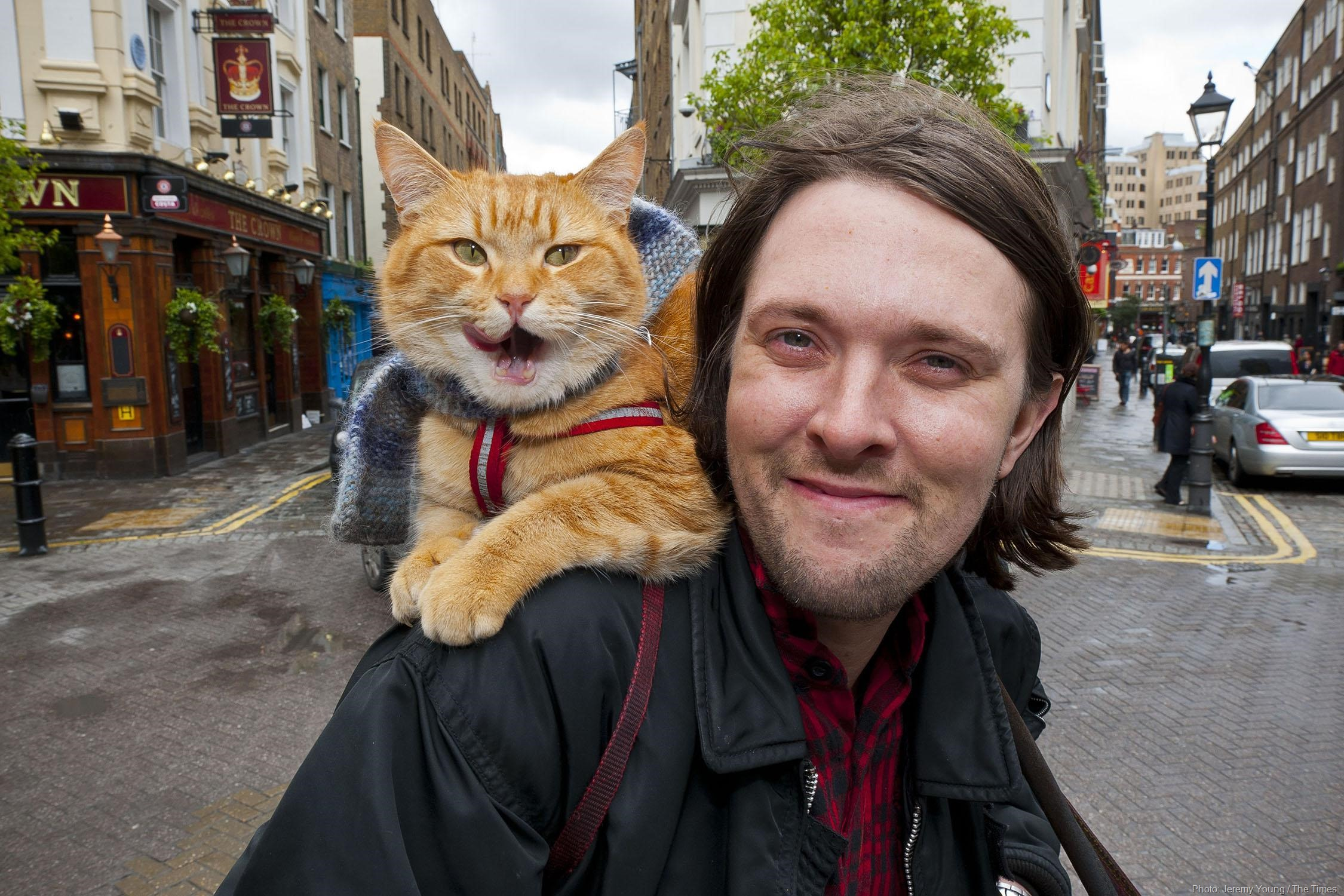
- Bowen and Bob in February 2013
- Born: 15 March 1979 (age 47); Surrey, England
- Occupations: Author, busker, musician
- Writing career
- Notable works: A Street Cat Named Bob; The World According to Bob; A Gift from Bob

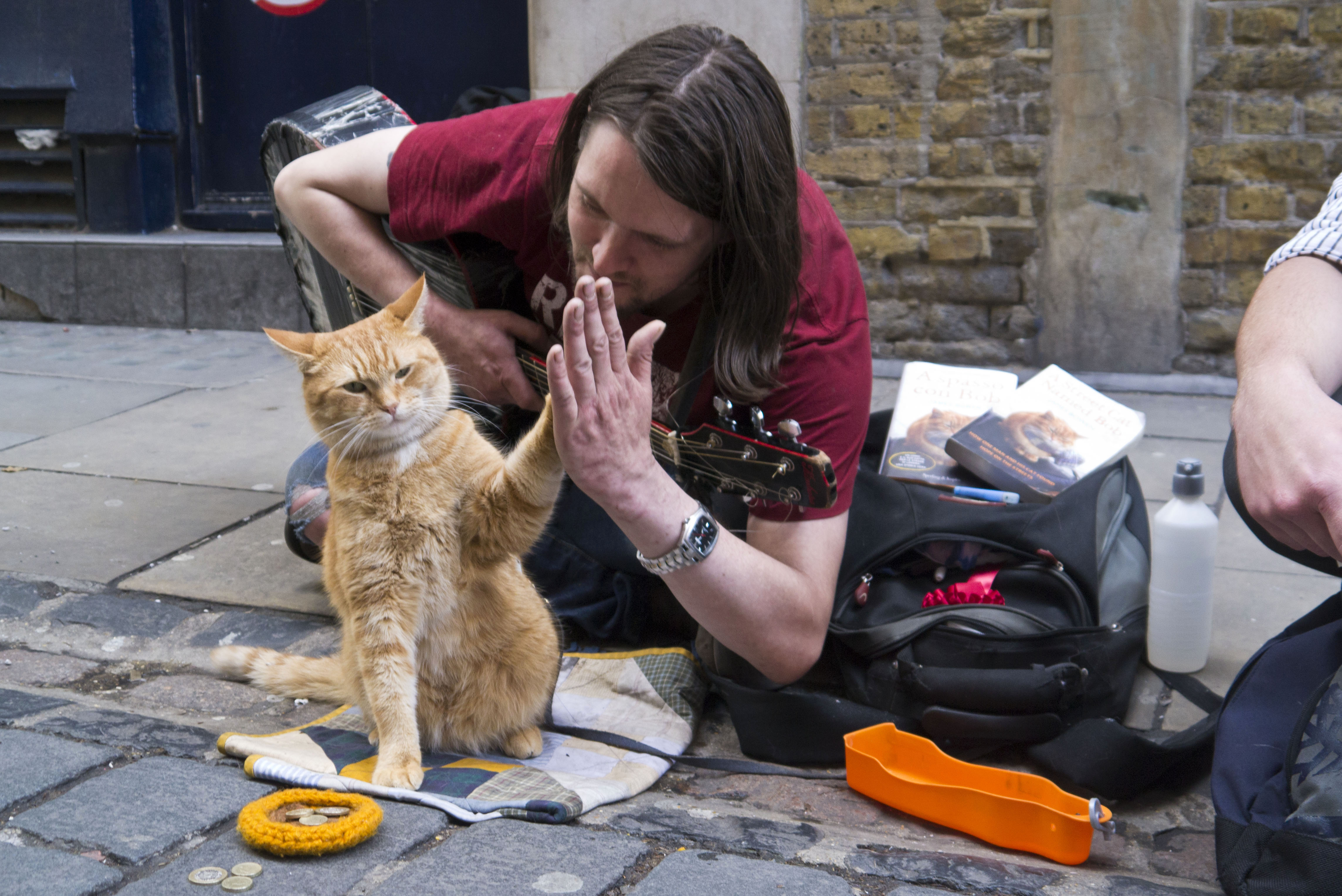
Bob the Street Cat high-fives his official biographer James Bowen

James Anthony Bowen (born 15 March 1979) is an English author based in London. His memoirs, A Street Cat Named Bob, The World According to Bob and A Gift from Bob, written with Garry Jenkins, were international bestsellers. A film adaptation based on the first two books was released in 2016, followed by a sequel in 2020. Bowen now dedicates his time to supporting various charities concerned with homelessness, literacy and animal welfare.

== Early life ==
Bowen was born in Surrey on 15 March 1979 to John and Penelope Bowen (née Hartford-Davis). Following his parents' divorce three years later, he moved to Australia with his mother. Due to their frequent relocations, Bowen rarely made friends and was often bullied at school. He later left education during his second year of high school, describing himself as a "tearaway kid".

In 1997, at the age of 17, he returned to the United Kingdom to seek his fortune, staying with his half-sister and her husband in London while attempting to build a career in music. However, tensions developed and the arrangement soon ended. His hopes of pursuing a singing career faded as the band members gradually drifted apart.

Over time, Bowen began sleeping rough. For the next several years, he alternated between living on the streets and staying in shelters, often fearful of his surroundings. During this period, he began begging and using heroin to cope with the hardship of homelessness.

== Life with Bob ==
=== Meeting Bob ===
One evening, Bowen returned home to find a ginger cat sitting in the hallway of his building. Assuming the cat belonged to another resident, he went back to his flat. When the cat remained there over the next two days, Bowen became concerned. The cat was without a collar or identification tag, appeared underweight, had an unhealthy coat, scratches on its face, and an infected wound on its leg. After checking with other residents and finding that no one claimed ownership, Bowen decided to help the cat.

According to Bowen's account in A Street Cat Named Bob, he took the animal to a nearby Blue Cross pop-up veterinary clinic, where he was given antibiotics to treat the infection. Bowen used his last twenty pounds—money he had been saving for food—to pay for the medicine. Determined to ensure the cat completed its two-week course of antibiotics, he took him in temporarily while continuing to look for the owner. When it became clear that the cat was a stray, Bowen released him, hoping he would find his way home. Instead, the cat began following Bowen around, even boarding the bus when Bowen left to go busking. Realising the cat had nowhere else to go, Bowen decided to keep him and named him Bob, after the character Killer BOB from the television series Twin Peaks.

In the spring of 2007, Bowen resolved to improve his life for Bob's sake. He decided to stop using heroin and enrolled on a methadone programme. He continued busking in Covent Garden while living in supported housing in Tottenham, London.

=== Working with Bob ===
As Bob continued to follow Bowen to work, Bowen purchased a harness for safety and allowed him to accompany him to his regular busking spots in Covent Garden and Piccadilly Circus. Bob would travel on the number 73 bus, usually sitting by the window. The pair became well known locally, and their popularity grew further when Bowen began selling The Big Issue. Members of the public uploaded videos of the duo to YouTube, and tourists visited Covent Garden specifically to see them. During this time, Bowen completed his methadone treatment, crediting Bob for inspiring his recovery. "I believe it came down to this little man," he said. "He came and asked me for help and he needed me more than I needed to abuse my own body. He is what I wake up for every day now. He's definitely given me the right direction to live my life."

=== Bob's later life and death ===
In his later years, Bob was kept as an indoor cat and occasionally taken for walks in a nearby park on his harness. Bowen also commissioned a purpose-built catio to allow Bob safe access to their garden.

On 13 June 2020, Bob was last seen at approximately 11:00 p.m. after being fed in the kitchen of their home in Surrey. Two days later, on 15 June 2020, Bob was found dead at the roadside about half a mile from home and taken to a nearby veterinary practice. Bowen was notified by the vet over the phone. The cause of death was determined to be a haematoma resulting from a head-on collision with a car; the driver was never identified. Bob had escaped through a skylight that had accidentally been left open. He was believed to be between 14 and 16 years old.

Following news of Bob's death, The Big Issue received an outpouring of tributes, messages and memories from fans around the world. In 2021, a memorial to Bob was unveiled at Islington Green.

== Life since 2020 ==
Following Bob's death, Bowen stated that he was dropped by his agent. He subsequently relapsed into heroin use but became clean again in January 2023. Later that year, he sold his house due to “rising mortgage rates” and became homeless once more. When he sold his house, his four remaining cats were rehomed, although he kept his Shih Tzu dog for companionship.

As of 2024, Bowen resides in North London.

== Books and films ==
Several books have been published about Bowen and Bob, two of which have been adapted into films.

=== A Street Cat Named Bob ===
Bowen and Bob's public appearances attracted the attention of the Islington Tribune, which first published their story in September 2010. The article was read by Mary Pachnos, the literary agent responsible for the UK rights to John Grogan's Marley & Me, who introduced Bowen to writer Garry Jenkins. The pair produced an outline for a book, which Pachnos used to secure a publishing deal with Hodder & Stoughton.

Since its release, the book has sold over one million copies in the United Kingdom, has been translated into 30 languages, and spent more than 76 weeks at the top of The Sunday Times bestseller list in both its hardback and paperback editions. A Street Cat Named Bob: And How He Saved My Life was published in the United States on 30 July 2013, entering The New York Times bestseller list at No. 7.

A film adaptation was optioned by London-based Shooting Script Films and producer Adam Rolston in March 2014. In August 2015, Variety announced that Luke Treadaway would star in the film and Roger Spottiswoode would direct, with filming in London set to begin in October. During production, it was revealed that Bob played himself in the majority of the film's scenes. The film was released in the United Kingdom in November 2016.

=== The World According to Bob ===
The World According to Bob continues the story of Bowen and Bob's life on the streets, including the period leading up to their meeting with agent Mary Pachnos. It was released on 4 July 2013 and also reached number one on The Sunday Times bestseller list.

=== Bob: No Ordinary Cat ===
Bob: No Ordinary Cat is a children's version of A Street Cat Named Bob. It was released on Valentine's Day 2013.

=== Where in the World Is Bob? ===
Where in the World Is Bob? is a picture book in which readers must spot Bob, James, and various other items in scenes set around the world. The concept mirrors the blog Around the World in 80 Bobs, where fans posted photographs of the cat in locations worldwide. It was published in October 2013.

=== My Name Is Bob ===
My Name Is Bob is a picture book for young children, written by Bowen with Garry Jenkins and illustrated by Gerald Kelley. It was published by Random House in April 2014 and imagines Bob's life prior to meeting Bowen.

=== For the Love of Bob ===
For the Love of Bob is a children's version of The World According to Bob and the sequel to Bob: No Ordinary Cat. It was released on 3 July 2014.

=== A Gift from Bob ===
A Gift from Bob is a short story recounting Bowen and Bob's final Christmas on the streets together. According to the publisher, Hodder & Stoughton, the book "reveals how Bob helped James through one of his toughest times – providing strength, friendship and inspiration, while teaching him important lessons about the true meaning of Christmas". It was published on 9 October 2014 and reached number eight on The Sunday Times bestseller list.

In October 2019, it was announced that a film adaptation, directed by Charles Martin Smith and written by Garry Jenkins, would go into production later that year, with a cinema release planned for 2020. A Gift from Bob was released on 6 November 2020, with both Luke Treadaway and Bob reprising their roles.

=== Bob to the Rescue ===
Bob to the Rescue is a second children's picture book, written again with Garry Jenkins and illustrated by Gerald Kelley. It was published by Random House in September 2014.

=== The Little Book of Bob ===
The Little Book of Bob: Life Lessons from a Street-Wise Cat compiles lessons and reflections Bowen learned from his years with his "streetwise" companion. It was published by Hodder & Stoughton on 1 November 2018.

== Music ==
In addition to his books, Bowen has released music inspired by his life and relationship with Bob. The charity singles "And Then Came Bob" and "Time to Move On" were released by Macaferri Music in 2018. Both tracks were mixed at Broadway Studio and mastered at Abbey Road Studios in London.

"And Then Came Bob" was composed by Roger Ferris, Glo Macari and Dominic Ferris, while "Time to Move On" was co-written by Bowen and fellow busker Henry Facey.

Dominic Ferris also featured in and produced both tracks. He is shown in the accompanying video producing and mixing the song, with Bob appearing on the audio desk.

Both singles were launched at a ticketed live event in November 2018 at Phoenix Garden in Covent Garden, where Bowen performed alongside Ferris and Facey.

Proceeds from "And Then Came Bob" were donated to The Big Issue Foundation, which supports homeless people across the United Kingdom. Bowen and his team campaigned to reach the UK Christmas number one in 2018 with the single.

== Awards ==
A Street Cat Named Bob was nominated for the UK's National Book Awards in the Popular Non-Fiction category in November 2012.

In March 2014, the book was ranked seventh in a list of the most inspiring teenage reads as part of a poll for World Book Day.

== See also ==
- List of individual cats
