= Marlon Bundo's A Day in the Life of the Vice President =

Children's book by Charlotte Pence

- Author: Charlotte Pence
- Illustrator: Karen Pence
- Cover artist: Karen Pence
- Language: English
- Genre: Children's literature
- Set in: Number One Observatory Circle
- Publisher: Regnery Kids
- Publication date: March 19, 2018
- Publication place: United States
- Pages: 40
- ISBN: 978-1621577768

Marlon Bundo's A Day in the Life of the Vice President is a 2018 children's book by Charlotte Pence as author and Karen Pence as illustrator. It details a fictional day in the life of Marlon Bundo, pet rabbit of Vice President of the United States Mike Pence, father of Charlotte and husband of Karen. It received lukewarm reviews from professional critics, who praised the illustrations but found fault with the prose.

== Concept ==
The book is an educational story explaining to children what the job of Vice President of the United States entails as seen through the eyes of the Pence family pet rabbit Marlon Bundo. The book was announced on the Instagram account dedicated to Marlon Bundo on September 15, 2017. Second Lady Karen Pence, a former teacher and a watercolor artist, painted the book's illustrations over a period of about four months. The book was released on March 19, 2018, by the children's arm of Regnery Publishing, a conservative book publisher. A book tour stopped at military bases, the Nixon and Reagan presidential libraries, and the conservative nonprofit organization Focus on the Family.

Proceeds from the book's sales were to be donated to Tracy's Kids – an art therapy program Karen Pence brought to the Riley Hospital for Children in Indianapolis – and The A21 Campaign, a nonprofit organization working to end human trafficking. Two of Karen Pence's original watercolors for the book illustrations were also auctioned to raise money for Tracy's Kids.

=== The rabbit ===
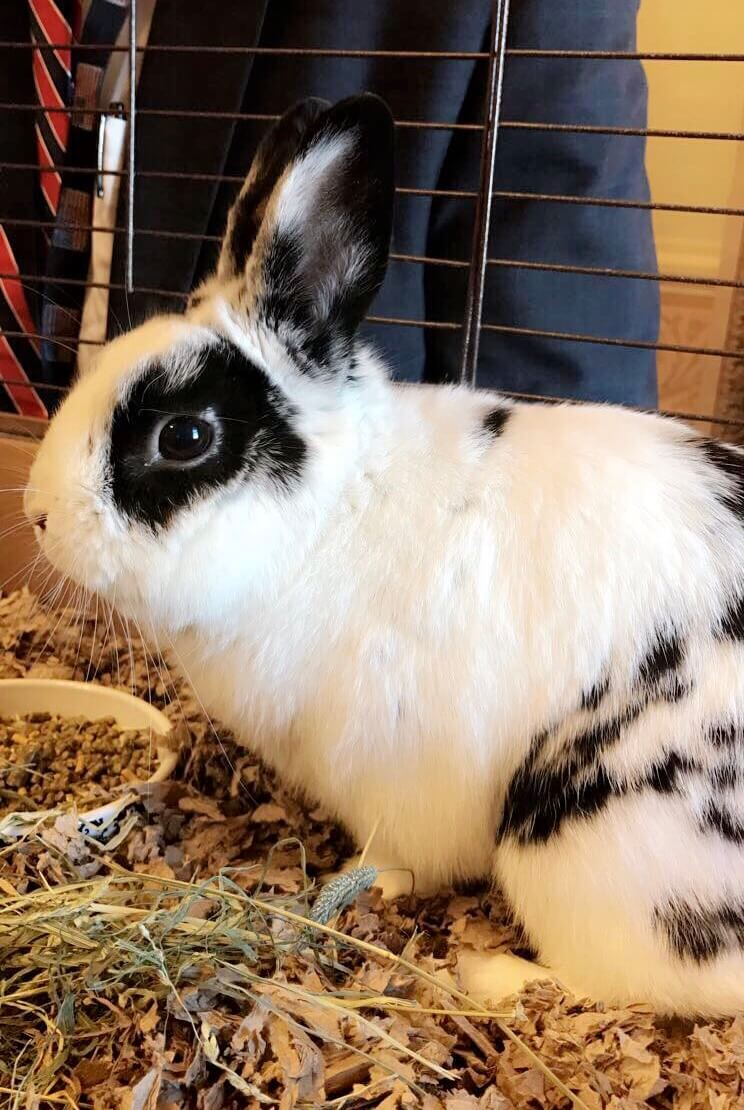
Marlon Bundo, the Pence family's pet rabbit

Charlotte Pence acquired the rabbit that became the book's lead character when she was a film school student at Chicago's DePaul University in 2013. The rabbit was later named Marlon Bundo after the seller asked Pence to make an offer on the rabbit. This was taken as a reference to Marlon Brando's Don Vito Corleone saying "I'm gonna make him an offer he can't refuse." in the 1972 film The Godfather. Pence featured the rabbit in a short film project and then kept him as a family pet. He is said to be well-behaved and is the first rabbit to have flown on Air Force Two, when the Pences moved to Washington, D.C. The Pences planned to take Marlon Bundo on the book's press tour.

== Plot ==
The story details the experiences of Marlon Bundo, the Pence family pet rabbit and BOTUS (Bunny of the United States), as he follows Grampa (vice president Mike Pence) around for a day. Included are visits to the Oval Office, the Senate, the vice president's office, and the telescope at their home at the Naval Observatory. At the end of the day, Marlon joins the vice president in reading the Bible and praying before bed.

== Reception ==
=== Commercial performance ===
One week after the book's launch date, Regnery Publishing reported that Marlon Bundo's A Day in the Life of the Vice President was in its third printing, totaling more than 100,000 copies. Publishers Weekly estimated the book had sold 26,000 copies as of May 11, 2018.

=== Critical reception ===
On its launch date, a number of one-star reviews with negative comments were left on the book's Amazon page by non-buyers who favored the parody book, A Day in the Life of Marlon Bundo. Later that day, it was no longer possible to review the Pences' book without purchasing it and one-star ratings from non-buyers had been removed.

Kirkus Reviews called the book's illustrations "competent", the author's verse "execrable" and the publication as a whole "[a]nodyne at best", noting the absence of 'people of color' throughout the book and giving it a "skip it" rating. Similarly, Susie Wilde of The News & Observer praised the illustrations and criticized the writing, "Pence shows her skill at realistic watercolors and captures the cuteness factor of the real BOTUS.... The book fails when it comes to the text, though." Esquire mentioned the strained verse as well and called the book mediocre. Katy Waldman in The New Yorker also criticized the book's verse as "mostly embarrassing."

=== Parody ===
Charlotte Pence's book and Mike Pence's staunch opposition to same-sex marriage inspired Last Week Tonight with John Oliver writer Jill Twiss to author A Day in the Life of Marlon Bundo. The story details the same-sex romance of rabbits Marlon Bundo and Wesley, who face opposition from a stink bug who is against same-sex marriage. A Day in the Life of Marlon Bundo is billed as an actual children's story about marriage equality and democracy, rather than as a straight-up parody of Charlotte Pence's book, yet it includes some "definite digs" at the vice president.

Charlotte Pence supported A Day in the Life of Marlon Bundo, posting on Twitter a picture of herself and the real-life Marlon Bundo wearing a bow tie identical to the one in Jill Twiss' book, and saying on Mornings with Maria: "His book is contributing to charities that I think we can all get behind... I'm all for it." The official Marlon Bundo Instagram account also referred to Twiss' book in a positive light, stating "Not gonna lie, I do look pretty fly in a bow tie. The only thing better than one bunny book for charity is...TWO bunny books for charity." The Twiss book's profits were also given to charities, namely The Trevor Project and AIDS United.

Conversely, Regnery Publishing initially criticized the release of A Day in the Life of Marlon Bundo, saying that it was "unfortunate that anyone would feel the need to ridicule an educational children's book and turn it into something controversial and partisan." When the success of both books became apparent, Regnery complimented John Oliver and Chronicle Books for their sales figures, adding: "There's plenty to go around for everyone and, like Charlotte [Pence] said, we can all be happy the proceeds are going to a good cause."

== See also ==
- C. Fred's Story (1984)
- Millie's Book (1990)
- Dear Socks, Dear Buddy (1998)
