= AIDS United =

U.S. nonprofit organization

AIDS United is a national non-profit organization based in Washington, D.C., focused on ending the AIDS epidemic in the United States.

== History and mission ==
AIDS United was born out of a merger between two Washington, D.C.–based organizations: the National AIDS Fund (NAF), a strategic grantmaking foundation and public charity, and AIDS Action, an advocacy organization for sound policy creation and the dissemination of education regarding the AIDS epidemic. NAF was founded in 1987, with the mission to support community-driven responses to the HIV epidemic around the country that would reach the nation’s most disproportionately affected populations, including gay and bisexual men, communities of color, women, people living in the deep South and people living with HIV/AIDS. AIDS Action was developed out of a 1984 coalition among AIDS service organizations across the United States, in response to the federal government’s seeming indifference at that time to the needs of communities affected by HIV. Their mission was to cultivate and create policies and programs in response to the HIV epidemic, distribute information, and advocate on behalf of all those living with and affected by HIV. The two organizations merged in 2010 to form AIDS United, under the direction of Mark Ishaug, then president and CEO of the AIDS Foundation of Chicago.

== Administration ==
Jesse Milan Jr. is the president and chief executive officer of AIDS United.
