= Vice presidency of Mike Pence =

U.S. vice presidential tenure from 2017 to 2021

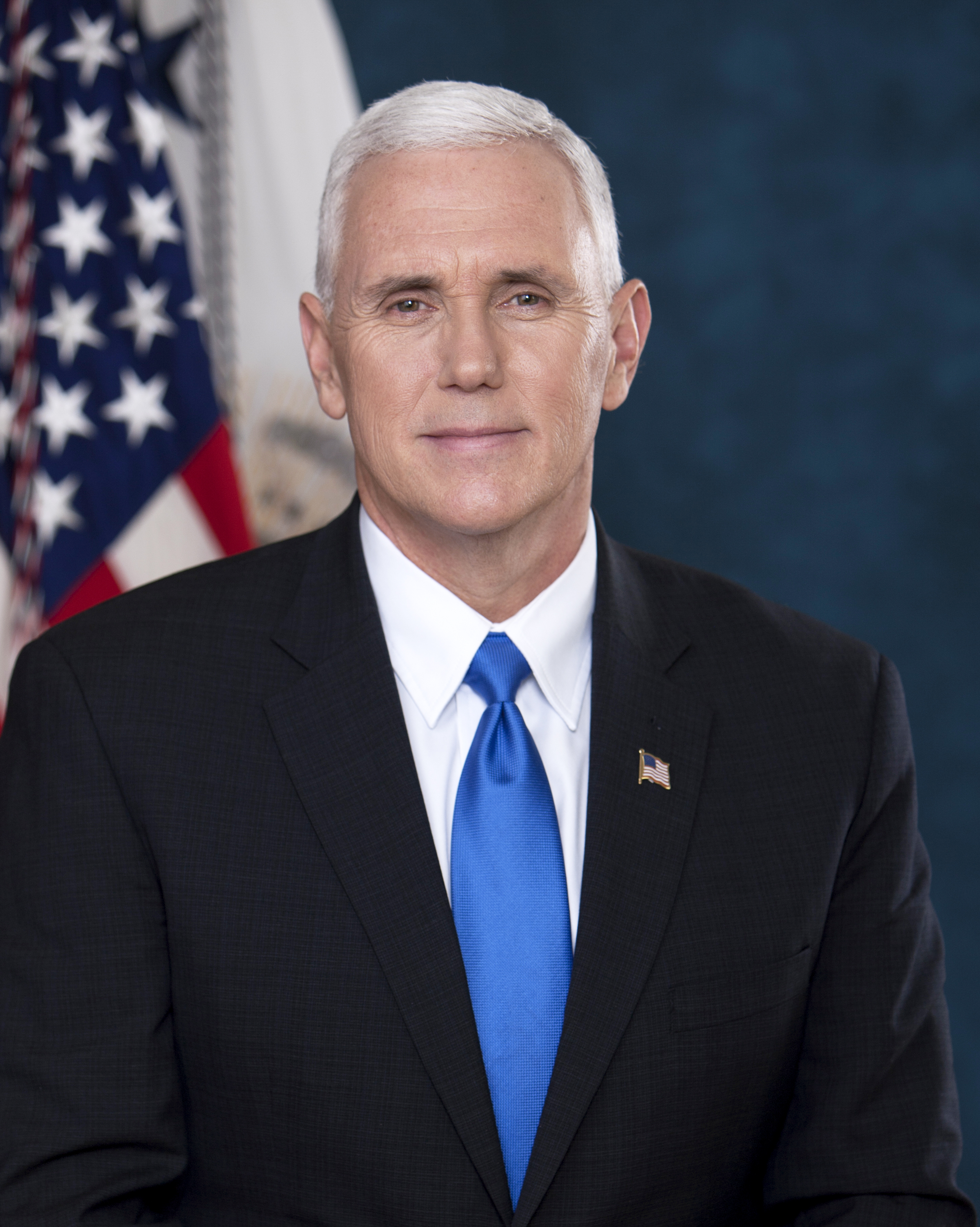
- Official portrait, 2017
- Vice presidency of Mike Pence; January 20, 2017 – January 20, 2021
- President: Donald Trump
- Cabinet: See list
- Party: Republican
- Election: 2016
- Seat: Number One Observatory Circle
- Seal of the Vice President

Mike Pence served as the 48th vice president of the United States during the first presidency of Donald Trump from January 20, 2017, to January 20, 2021. Pence, a member of the Republican Party who previously served as the Governor of Indiana from 2013 to 2017, was selected as Trump's running mate and took office following their electoral college victory in the 2016 presidential election over Democratic nominees Hillary Clinton and Tim Kaine. The defining moment of Pence's vice presidency was his refusal to obey Trump's orders to overturn the 2020 United States presidential election during the January 6, 2021 United States Capitol attack.

Pence's vice presidency was not as influential in day-to-day governance as his three predecessors, Al Gore, Dick Cheney, and Joe Biden. Alongside Pence's vice presidency, the Republican Party also held their majorities in the House of Representatives and the Senate during the 115th U.S. Congress following the 2016 elections, attained an overall federal government trifecta. During Pence's tenure as vice president, he chaired the National Space Council and the White House Coronavirus Task Force.

Trump and Pence lost the 2020 presidential election to Joe Biden and Kamala Harris. Trump refused to concede, made false or unproven allegations of election fraud, and filed numerous unsuccessful lawsuits in multiple states. As vice president in his capacity as the president of the Senate, Pence oversaw the certification of Biden and Harris as the winners of the election, despite Trump's urging to overturn the election results and the attack on the U.S. Capitol on January 6, 2021. Trump and Pence were succeeded in office by Biden and Harris on January 20, 2021.

Pence distanced himself from Trump during and after January 6, 2021, endorsing candidates in primary elections in opposition to those supported by Trump and criticizing Trump's conduct on the day of the Capitol attack. In June 2023, Pence launched a 2024 presidential bid but withdrew by October. He declined to endorse Trump in 2024.

== 2016 vice presidential campaign ==
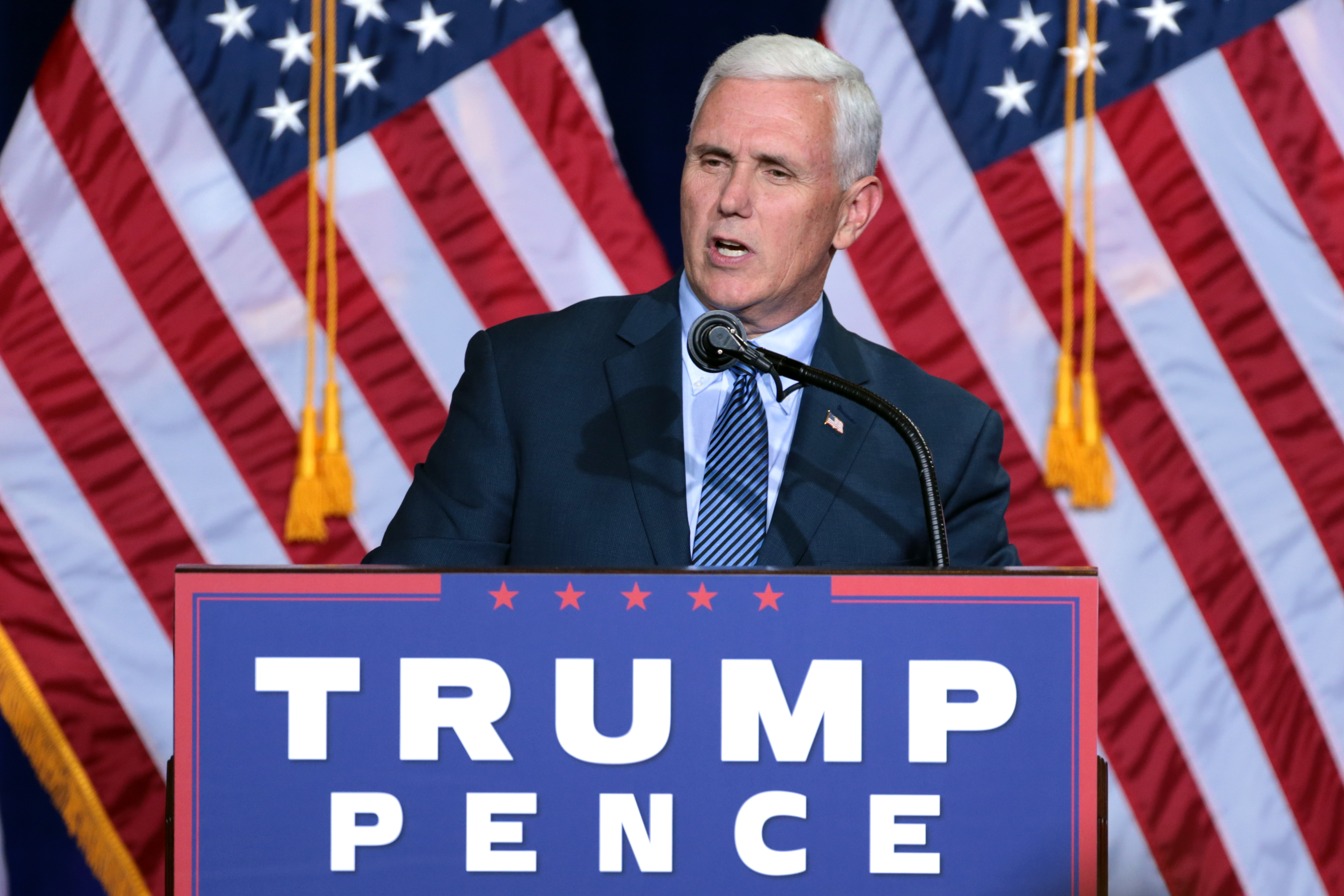
Pence speaks at a campaign rally in Phoenix, Arizona, August 2016.

Shortly before the 2016 Indiana Republican presidential primary, Pence endorsed Texas U.S. Senator Ted Cruz, who would lose the primary to Trump. Pence then endorsed Trump after the latter became the party's presumptive nominee for president of the United States.

Donald Trump considered naming Pence as his vice presidential running mate along with other finalists including New Jersey governor Chris Christie and former House speaker Newt Gingrich. Pence had stronger connections at the time to the politically influential big donors, the Kochs, than Trump did. It was widely reported on July 14 that Pence planned to end his (Indiana gubernatorial) re-election campaign and accept the Republican vice presidential nomination instead. The following day, Trump officially announced on Twitter that Pence would be his running mate.

Immediately after the announcement, Pence said he was "very supportive of Donald Trump's call to temporarily suspend immigration from countries where terrorist influence and impact represents a threat to the United States". Pence said he was "absolutely" in sync with Trump's Mexican wall proposal, falsely saying Mexico was "absolutely" going to pay for it.

According to a FiveThirtyEight rating of candidates' ideology, Pence was the most conservative vice-presidential candidate in the last 40 years.

Pence called Dick Cheney his role model for vice president.

During Pence's preparations for the vice presidential debate in October 2016, Wisconsin governor Scott Walker played the role of Democratic vice presidential nominee Tim Kaine. In Kaine's own debate prep, lawyer Robert Barnett was selected to play Pence. Following the debate, experts concluded Pence won against Kaine, with a CNN poll showing 48 percent of viewers thought Pence won and 42 percent believing Kaine won. Pence's "cooler" temperament was seen as an advantage compared to Kaine, who was perceived as more hotheaded.

On October 7, 2016, lewd comments made by Donald Trump in 2005 surfaced and gained heavy media attention. That day, Pence said to reporters, "I do not condone his remarks and cannot defend them," but made clear that he was standing by Trump. In response to the revelation, Paul Ryan "uninvited" Trump from what would have been a joint campaign event. The Trump campaign attempted to substitute Pence for Trump at the event, but according to The New York Times, Pence called Trump on October 8 and told him that he (Pence) would not appear at the event, and that Trump would need to handle the next 48 hours on his own, as Pence did not think he would be an effective surrogate for Trump.

According to Bob Woodward's 2018 book Fear: Trump in the White House, in the midst of the scandal, then-Republican National Committee chairman Reince Priebus told Trump he should drop out of the race for the good of the party, and that Pence had agreed to replace Trump on the top of the ticket as the Republican presidential nominee, with former Secretary of State Condoleezza Rice agreeing to be Pence's running mate.

On October 10, 2016, Pence appeared on CNN and said, in response to rumors that he was leaving the ticket, that it was "absolutely false to suggest that at any point in time we considered dropping off this ticket" and that it is the "greatest honor of my life" to be nominated as Trump's running mate.

On November 8, 2016, Pence was elected vice president of the United States as Trump's running mate.

== Vice presidency (2017–2021) ==
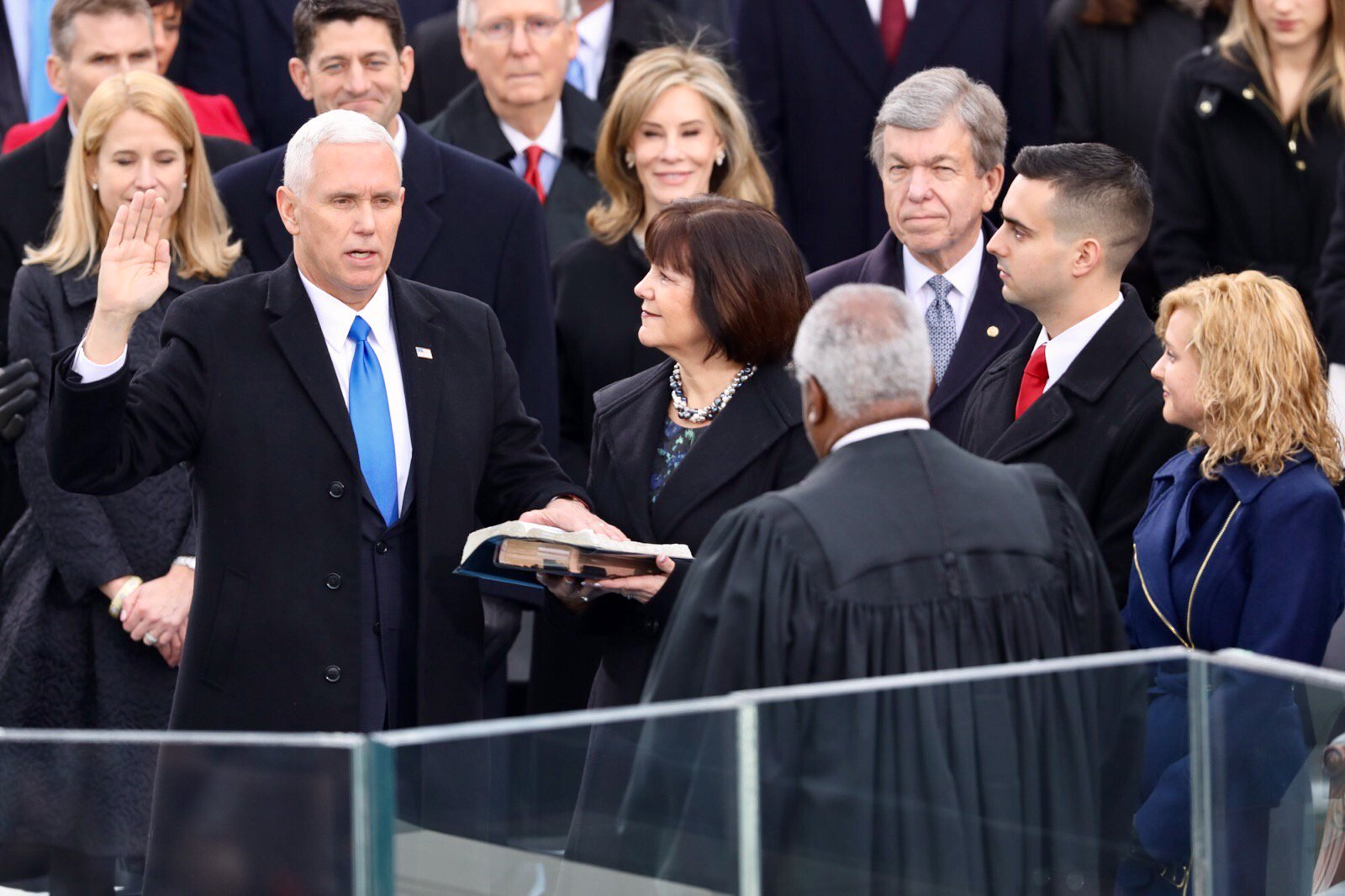
Pence being sworn in as vice president by Supreme Court Justice Clarence Thomas on January 20, 2017

Soon after the election, he was appointed chairman of President-elect Trump's transition team. During the transition phase of the Trump administration, Pence was reported as holding a large degree of influence in the administration due to his roles as a mediator between Trump and congressional Republicans, for reassuring conservatives about Trump's conservative credentials, and his influence in determining Donald Trump's cabinet. As Vice President, Pence received the Presidential Daily Briefing from intelligence experts; for the last year of his term, Pence's briefer was an openly trans woman, Julia Curlee.

On January 20, 2017, at noon, Pence became the 48th vice president of the United States, sworn into the office by justice Clarence Thomas.

Official portrait, 2017

=== Initial tenure ===
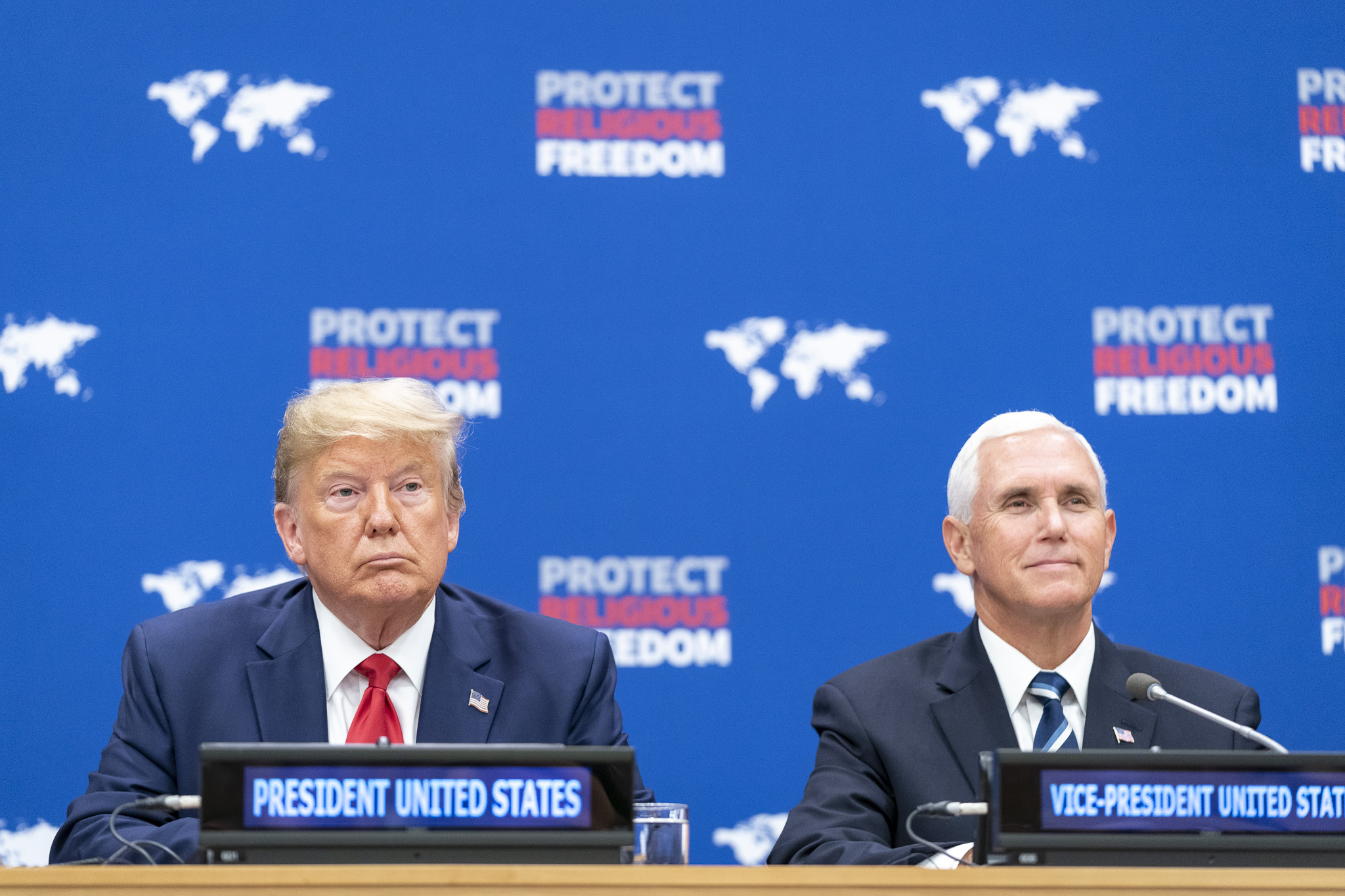
Pence with Trump in 2019

On the first day in office (January 20), Pence performed various ceremonial duties, including swearing in Jim Mattis as United States secretary of defense and John Kelly as secretary of homeland security. He also administered the oath of office to the White House senior staff on January 22, 2017.

Pence also sat in on calls made by President Trump to foreign heads of government and state such as Russian president Vladimir Putin and Australian prime minister Malcolm Turnbull.

In January, Pence appointed Josh Pitcock as his chief of staff, whom he had known from his gubernatorial and congressional days. The following month, Jarrod Agen was tapped as deputy assistant to the president and director of communications to the vice president; his previous job being chief of staff for governor of Michigan Rick Snyder through the time of the Flint water crisis. In July, Pitcock stepped down as chief of staff, and was succeeded in the position by Nick Ayers, another longtime Pence advisor.

On February 5, 2017, Pence warned Iran "not to test the resolve" of the new Trump administration following their ballistic missile tests.

On February 7, 2017, Pence, in his dual constitutional role as president of the United States Senate made the first ever tie-breaking vote to confirm a Cabinet member. He cast the deciding vote to break a fifty-fifty tie to confirm Betsy DeVos as the secretary of education. Pence cast his second tie-breaking vote on March 30, voting to advance a bill to defund Planned Parenthood. In 2018, Pence broke a tie to confirm Jonathan A. Kobes for the U.S. Court of Appeals for the Eighth Circuit. This was the first-ever tie-breaking vote to confirm a judicial nominee in U.S. history. In total, Pence cast 13 tie-breaking votes, the seventh-most in history and more than the previous four predecessors combined. (By comparison, his successor, Kamala Harris, cast a total of 33 tie-breaking votes, the most by any senate president, and more than the previous six predecessors combined.)

On May 21, 2017, Pence delivered the commencement address at the University of Notre Dame. Traditionally, the president delivers the address at Notre Dame in his inaugural year, but in 2017 Pence was invited instead when Trump decided to speak at Liberty University.

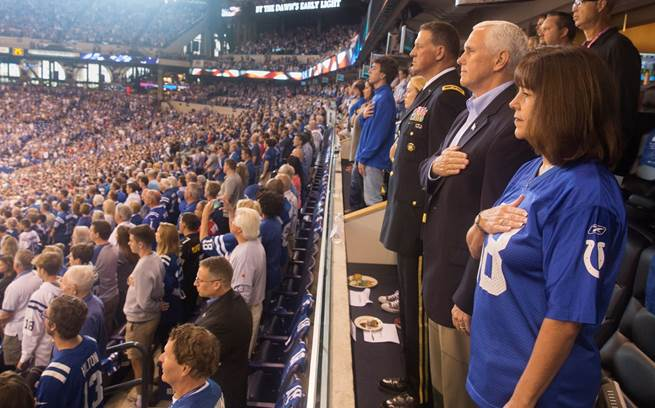
Vice President Mike Pence, Second Lady Karen Pence, and Major General Courtney P. Carr stand for the national anthem.

On October 8, 2017, Pence walked out of a game between the NFL's Indianapolis Colts and San Francisco 49ers after members of the 49ers knelt during the national anthem. Shortly afterwards, Pence commented via Twitter, "President Trump and I will not dignify any event that disrespects our soldiers, our Flag, or our national anthem," adding, "While everyone is entitled to their own opinion, I don't think it's too much to ask NFL players to respect the flag and our national anthem." Pence was widely criticized by various people for what was considered a publicity stunt. Democratic representative Adam Schiff (CA-28) questioned how much taxpayer's money was used to fund Pence's actions, and CNN later estimated that the total cost of his eight hours of travel on Air Force Two to attend the game was about $242,500, not including ground transportation and security. 49ers safety Eric Reid (the second NFL player after Colin Kaepernick to participate in the protests) told reporters it was predictable that Pence would walk out, knowing that most of the team were protesting. Reid also expressed doubt over the regularity Pence is in terms of attending Colts matches, and referenced a photograph of the vice president and his wife in Colts uniform that had been tweeted before the match, although the official photograph (right) proved otherwise. The photograph in question was first published in 2014. Sportswriter Peter King wrote that the furor surrounding Pence had overshadowed Peyton Manning, who was being honored by the Colts, saying, "Pence trumped a day that belonged to the greatest football hero the state of Indiana has ever seen, and he did it for political purposes ... he stole Manning's last great day as a Colt. [He] will have to live with himself for that." The following year, Pence reacted positively on Twitter, after NFL owners unanimously decided to approve a new policy requiring all players to stand (or, given the option to stay in the locker room) during the national anthem, despite not consulting the NFL Players Association.

== Chair of the National Space Council ==
On June 30, 2017, Pence was appointed chair of the National Space Council after Trump signed an executive order reestablishing the council. As chair, Pence held eight meetings from 2017 to 2020.

== Foreign policy ==
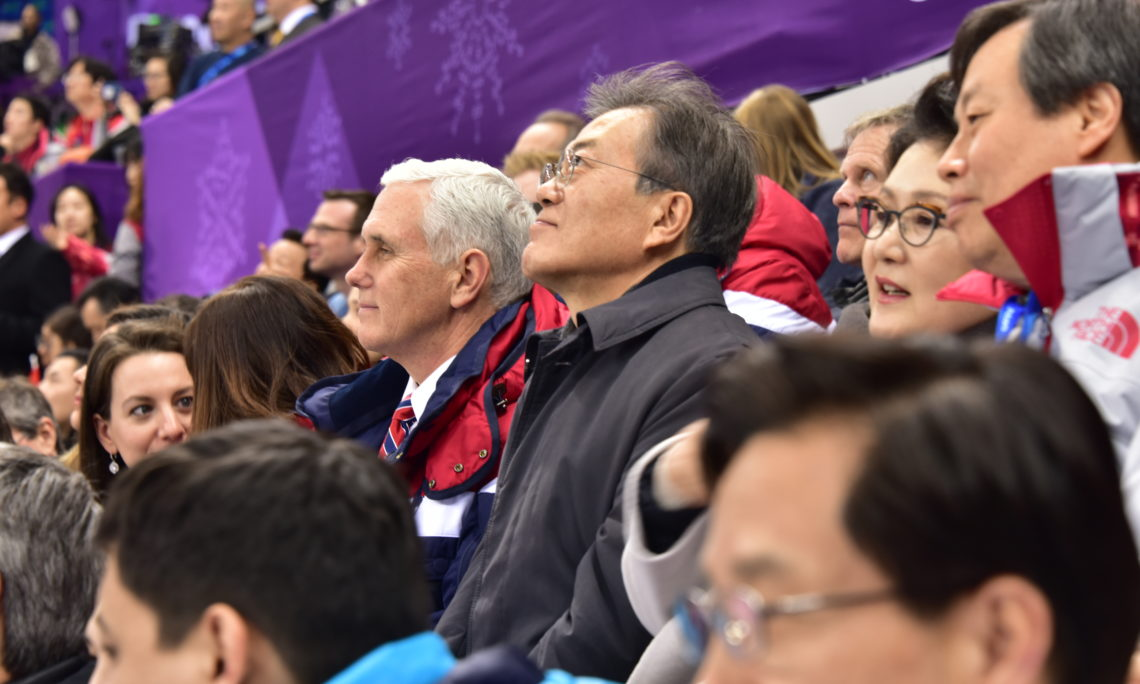
Pence with South Korean president Moon Jae-in at the 2018 Winter Olympics

In April, Pence made a tour of the Asia-Pacific region. In South Korea, he met acting president Hwang Kyo-ahn and condemned North Korea's latest missile launch. In Japan, Pence met Prime Minister Shinzō Abe and pledged to work with Japan, South Korea, and China "to achieve a peaceable resolution and the denuclearization of the Korean peninsula," adding "The era of strategic patience is over and while all options are on the table." Pence subsequently traveled to Jakarta, Indonesia, where he met with president Joko Widodo, toured the largest mosque in the region (the Istiqlal Mosque), and praised moderate Islam. Pence ended his trip with stops in Sydney, Australia (where, after meeting with Malcolm Turnbull, he said the U.S. "intends to honor" a U.S.–Australia refugee resettlement agreement), Oahu, Hawaii, and American Samoa.

On February 1, 2018, it was announced that Pence would lead the presidential delegation to the 2018 Winter Olympics, alongside his wife. Much of Pence's time at Pyeongchang was affected by the ongoing North Korean crisis. Prior to the opening ceremony, on February 9, Pence skipped on a dinner held by South Korean president Moon Jae-in, as he would have shared a table with North Korea's ceremonial head of state Kim Yong-nam. Instead, he met with four North Korean defectors in Pyeongtaek, alongside his special guest, Fred Warmbier (the father of Otto Warmbier, who was arrested in North Korea for attempted theft, and sentenced to 15 years' imprisonment, before returning to the U.S. in a comatose state). At the ceremony, the Pences were seated in front of the North Korean delegates, and when North and South Korean athletes entered during the Parade of Athletes, they chose to stay seated, which prompted critics to accuse Pence of hypocrisy in regard to the NFL protests. Pence was supposed to meet with the North Koreans on February 10, but they pulled out at the last day.

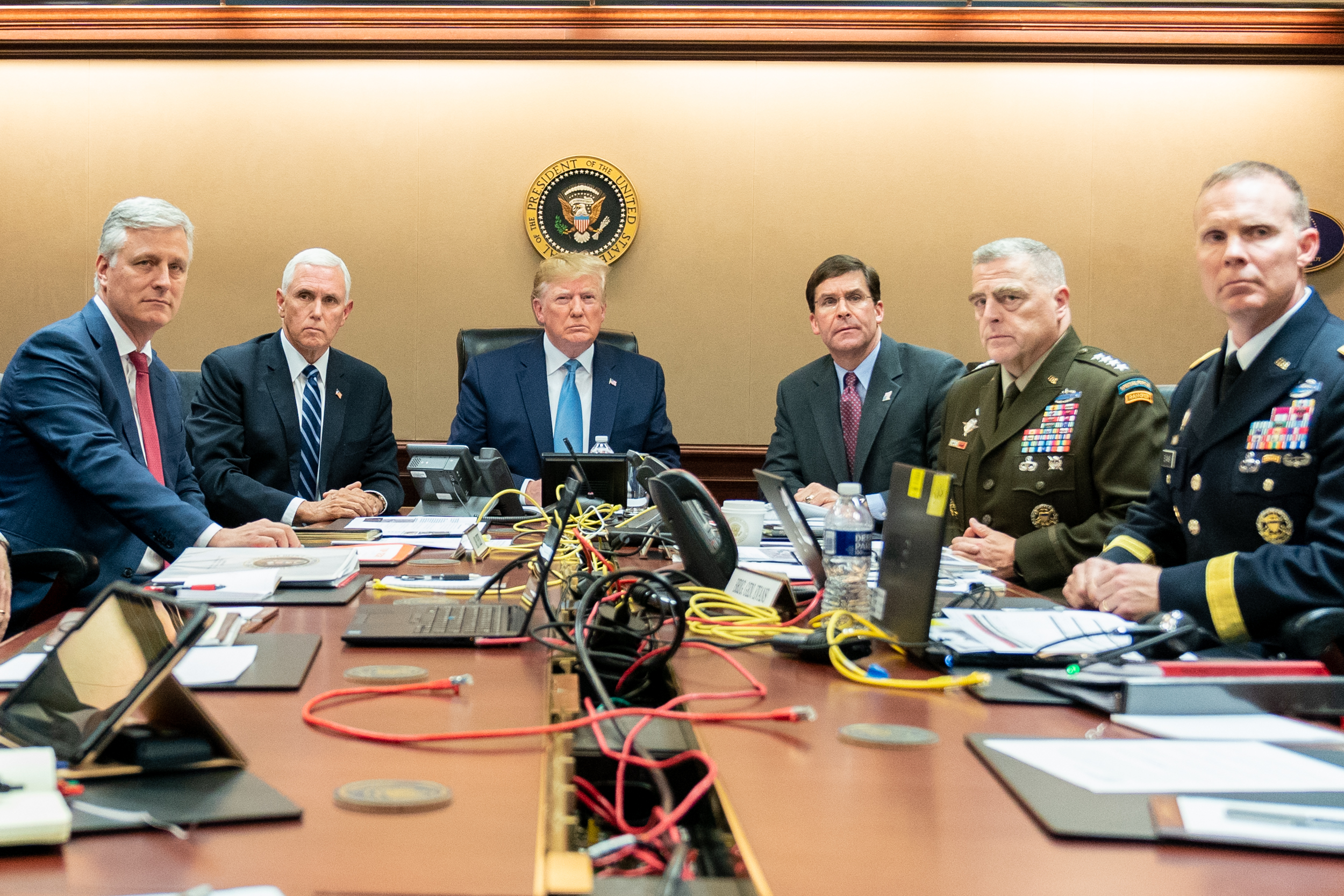
Pence (second from left) during the U.S. military raid on ISIL leader Abu Bakr al-Baghdadi on October 26, 2019

Over the next few months, the North Koreans started communicating more with their neighbors, as Supreme Leader Kim Jong-un secretly met with Chinese paramount leader Xi Jinping in March and then Moon Jae-in in an historic inter-Korean summit in April, and around the same time, a meeting between Trump and Kim was also proposed. On May 10, Pence accompanied Trump to Andrews Air Force Base as three American citizens were released by North Korea, and in an early morning interview with ABC's Jonathan Karl, he said seeing the men back on American soil "was really one of the greatest joys of my life". Talks broke down later that month following comments made by Pence and Trump, comparing the situation to events in Libya seven years previous, despite their voluntary disarmament of nuclear weapons in 2003. North Korean vice foreign minister Choe Son-hui called Pence's remarks "ignorant and stupid". On May 24, Trump abruptly called off the summit with Pence in attendance, only for him to change his mind a day later, later announcing that it would still be scheduled to take place on June 12 in Singapore.

In October 2018, Pence gave a speech regarding China at the Hudson Institute, accusing China of predatory economic practices, military aggression and trying to undermine President Trump. He said China "wants a different American president", and accused the country of meddling in U.S. elections. He said China was building "an unparalleled surveillance state" to suppress minorities, and accused it of engaging in "debt-trap diplomacy". In regards to Taiwan, he said "while our administration will continue to respect our One China Policy … Taiwan’s embrace of democracy shows a better path for all the Chinese people". The New York Times wrote the speech, with a tone much more hawkish than what U.S. officials previously used regarding China, was similar to a declaration of a new Cold War.

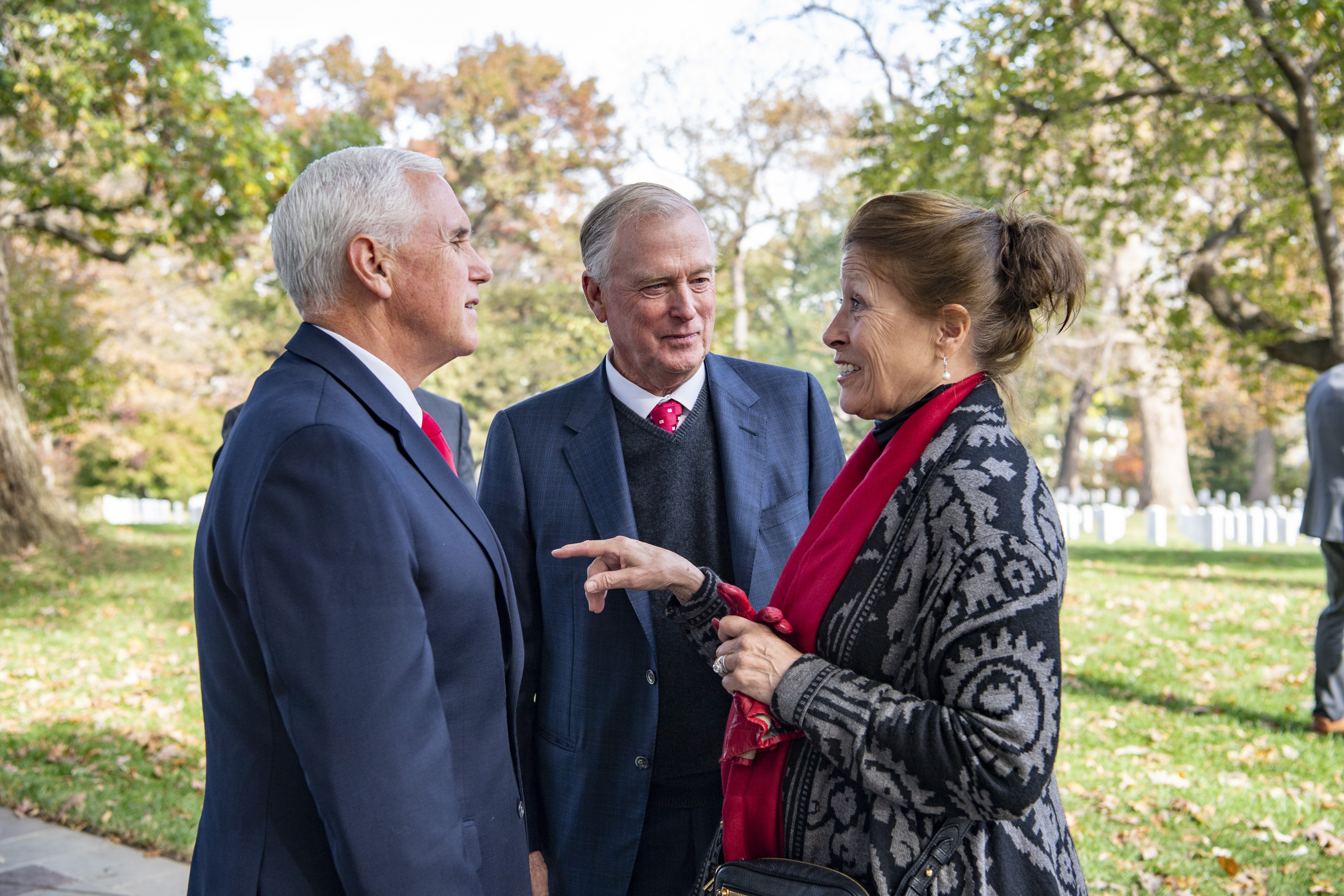
Former Vice President and fellow Hoosier Dan Quayle and Marilyn Quayle with Pence in 2019

In September 2019, Pence attended official meetings with Irish prime minister Leo Varadkar in Dublin, Ireland but stayed at President Trump's resort in Doonbeg, 180 miles (290 km) away. Pence's schedule included four hours spent in transit in one day, and two flights on Air Force Two before the end of the next day. Costs for the limousine service alone totaled $599,000 according to State Department receipts, compared to President Obama's three-day trip to Dublin with the same limousine company totaling $114,000.

In February 2020, Pence defended debt- and deficit-spending as a measure to stimulate economic growth.

=== Political action committee ===
In May 2017, Pence filed Federal Election Commission paperwork to form Great America Committee, a political action committee (PAC) that would be headed by his former campaign staffers Nick Ayers and Marty Obst. Pence is the only vice president to have started his own PAC while still in office. Pence denied a New York Times article's allegations that he would run for president in 2020, calling them "laughable and absurd", and said the article was "disgraceful and offensive".

=== Pence and the Trump impeachment inquiry ===
Pence was a key player in the Trump–Ukraine scandal and the Trump impeachment inquiry. Pence had at least two phone conversations and an in-person meeting with Volodymyr Zelenskyy, President of Ukraine. Pence met with Zelenskyy in Poland on September 1, 2019, during an unexpected delay in U.S. military aid to Ukraine. Pence later told the press that he did not mention 2020 presidential candidate and former vice president Joe Biden to Zelenskyy, but raised issues regarding Ukrainian corruption.

After the inquiry was opened, Pence publicly stated his support of Trump's call for foreign investigation into Joe Biden and his son Hunter, saying, "I think the American people have a right to know if the vice president of the United States or his family profited from his position." On October 3, Pence stated, "My predecessor had a son who was paid $50,000 a month to be on a Ukrainian board at the time that Vice President Biden was leading the Obama administration's efforts in Ukraine, I think [that] is worth looking into."

=== Death of Soleimani ===
Pence defended Trump's decision in January 2020 to assassinate the Iranian major general in the Islamic Revolutionary Guard Corps (IRGC) Qasem Soleimani, promoting conspiracy theories that supposedly linked the al-Qaeda attacks on the United States to Iran. In a series of tweets, the vice president termed Soleimani "an evil man who was responsible for killing thousands of Americans". Pence insisted Soleimani had "assisted in the clandestine travel to Afghanistan of 10 of the 12 terrorists who carried out the September 11 terrorist attacks", which critics said was his confusing the number of 9/11 hijackers (actually 19) and insinuating (without evidence) that the general was involved. Many experts responded that Pence's claims were unsubstantiated. Pence's spokeswoman Katie Waldman said that the dozen terrorists Pence referred to were those who had traveled through Afghanistan, ten of whom "were assisted by Soleimani".

== COVID-19 pandemic ==
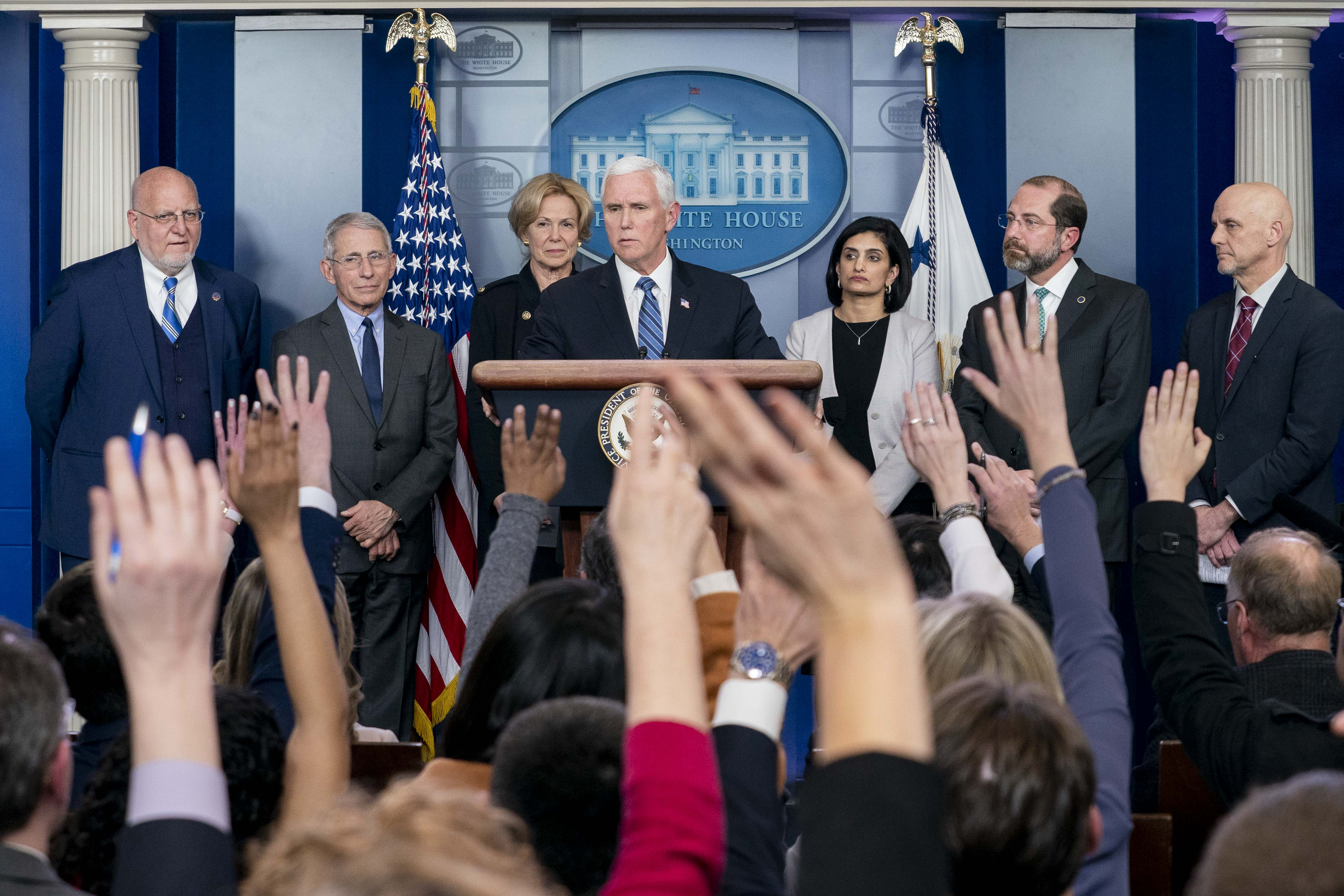
Pence and members of the White House Coronavirus Task Force brief the media in March 2020.

On February 26, 2020, President Trump named Pence as the leader of the White House Coronavirus Task Force to combat the spread of the COVID-19 pandemic in the U.S. Various public health officials and members of Congress had suggested the selection of a "Coronavirus Czar", though Trump said that would not be the title's name. As the leader of the task force, Pence coordinated efforts with the Centers for Disease Control and Prevention, Department of Health and Human Services, National Institutes of Health, Department of Homeland Security, and White House Office.

In April 2020, Pence exempted himself from the Mayo Clinic's policy of wearing a face mask in the hospital during a visit. Pence defended his action, saying he needed to look staff "in the eye". The next day, the vice president's opponents criticized him for promoting "completely irresponsible public health messaging". Later, Pence acknowledged he should have worn a mask during the hospital visit, and did so two days later when visiting a ventilator production facility.

In late June 2020, as coronavirus cases were spiking, Pence gave an optimistic press briefing where he made several misleading and false claims about the state of the coronavirus pandemic. He misleadingly argued that surges in cases were the result of increased testing, telling reporters that increases in new cases were "a reflection of a great success in expanding testing across the country". However, health experts noted that case growth outpaced the number of tests, and that the share of positive tests was increasing. Pence also falsely claimed that coronavirus fatalities were declining all across the country (Statistics here), that the curve had been flattened, and that all 50 states were opening up. In private meetings with Republican senators, Pence urged them to focus on "encouraging signs". Pence told the senators that cases were increasing in only 3% of counties and 12 states; however, data at the time showed that cases were increasing in at least 5% of counties and in at least 20 states. On December 18, the Pences received the Pfizer/BioNTech COVID-19 vaccine for SARS-CoV-2, in front of a live audience at a televised event to show Americans that the vaccine is safe and effective.

== Senate presidency ==
=== List of tie-breaking votes cast by Mike Pence ===
As President of the Senate, Pence cast several tie-breaking votes in order to pass legislation and confirm presidential appointments.

Date	Action	Vote	Ultimate result
February 7, 2017	PN37 (Nomination of Elisabeth Prince DeVos, of Michigan, to be Secretary of Education)	Yea: 51–50	Nomination confirmed.
March 30, 2017	Motion to proceed to H.J.Res. 43	Yea: 51–50	Motion agreed to.
March 30, 2017	H.J.Res. 43 (Providing for congressional disapproval under chapter 8 of title 5, United States Code, of the final rule submitted by Secretary of Health and Human Services relating to compliance with Title X requirements by project recipients in selecting subrecipients)	Yea: 51–50	Enacted. Pub. L. 115–23 (text) (PDF)
July 25, 2017	Motion to proceed to H.R. 1628 (American Health Care Act of 2017)	Yea: 51–50	Motion agreed to.
October 24, 2017	H.J.Res. 111 (Providing for congressional disapproval under chapter 8 of title 5, United States Code, of the rule submitted by Bureau of Consumer Financial Protection relating to "Arbitration Agreements")	Yea: 51–50	Enacted. Pub. L. 115–74 (text) (PDF)
December 2, 2017	S.Amdt. 1852 (Cruz 529 Savings Plan Amendment) to H.R. 1 (Tax Cuts and Jobs Act)	Yea: 51–50	Agreed to.
January 24, 2018	Motion to invoke cloture on PN1341 (Nomination of Sam Brownback, of Kansas, to be United States Ambassador-at-Large for International Religious Freedom)	Yea: 50–49	Motion agreed to.
January 24, 2018	PN1341 (Nomination of Sam Brownback, of Kansas, to be United States Ambassador-at-Large for International Religious Freedom)	Yea: 50–49	Nomination confirmed.
February 28, 2018	PN367 (Nomination of Russell Vought, of Virginia, to be Deputy Director of the Office of Management and Budget)	Yea: 50–49	Nomination confirmed.
November 28, 2018	Motion to invoke cloture on PN1412 (Nomination of Thomas Farr, of North Carolina, to be United States District Judge for the Eastern District of North Carolina)	Yea: 51–50	Motion agreed to.
November 29, 2018	Motion to invoke cloture on PN2117 (Nomination of Jonathan A. Kobes, of South Dakota, to be United States Circuit Judge for the Eighth Circuit)	Yea: 50–49	Motion agreed to.
December 11, 2018	PN2117 (Nomination of Jonathan A. Kobes, of South Dakota, to be United States Circuit Judge for the Eighth Circuit)	Yea: 51–50	Nomination confirmed.
December 21, 2018	Motion to proceed to the House Message to accompany H.R. 695 (Department of Defense Appropriations Act, 2018; a legislative vehicle used to fund various government departments.)	Yea: 48–47	Motion agreed to.

== 2020 vice presidential election ==
Ahead of his presidential campaign on February 28, 2019, Joe Biden referred to Pence as a "decent guy" in a speech in Omaha, Nebraska, when making an anecdote about an audience falling silent after Pence mentioned Trump's name. Biden later faced criticism for his complimentary remarks due to Pence's alleged anti-LGBT positions, which Biden would later apologize for and clarify by saying, "I was making a point in a foreign policy context, that under normal circumstances a Vice President wouldn't be given a silent reaction on the world stage." Biden had previously referred to Pence as a "decent guy" in 2018, and Pence and Biden exchanged conversations via phone before Pence's 2017 transition into the vice presidency.

In June 2019, the Democratic former New York City Council president Andrew Stein opined that Trump could improve his re-election chances by replacing Pence as his running mate with former South Carolina governor and former United States ambassador to the United Nations Nikki Haley. Despite that, Trump said Pence will be his running mate. He declined to endorse Pence should his running mate seek in 2024 to succeed him, but said he would give it "very strong consideration".

In remarks about law enforcement during the 2020 Republican convention, Pence said a federal security officer, Dave Underwood, "was shot and killed during the riots in Oakland", implying he was killed by rioters, when instead a man linked to the far-right Boogaloo movement had exploited the unrest as a cover for murder.

On October 7, 2020, Pence participated in a debate with Kamala Harris that was held by USA Today in Salt Lake City, Utah, and moderated by Susan Page, the Washington bureau chief of the newspaper. The debate was held with adaptations designed to avoid contagion of the COVID-19 virus given that the vice president had been in close contact with people who had been infected at a recent event at the White House. Plexiglas partitions separated the candidates and masks were required for all attending except the candidates and moderator. (Note: At the end of the debate, Second Lady Karen Pence was seen onstage without a mask, which her spokesperson said was on the basis of an agreement with Harris's husband, Douglas Emhoff, who ended up wearing his mask onstage.) By some estimates, Pence interrupted Harris twice as much as she interrupted him. Media outlets noted that near the end of the debate, a fly landed on Pence's head for almost two minutes. A CNN poll found that 59% of registered voters felt that Harris had won the debate, while 38% felt that Pence had.

On November 7, 2020, after several days of vote counting, Biden and Harris were declared by most major news networks to be the winners of the election. On December 14 the Electoral College confirmed the win, giving the Biden-Harris campaign 306 votes compared to 232 for the Trump–Pence campaign; however, Trump refused to concede and insisted that he had actually won. Throughout November and December Trump and his campaign filed more than 50 lawsuits alleging election fraud and other irregularities; all of them were eventually rejected by judges. Trump also pressured Republican officials, lawmakers and even the Justice Department to take actions to overturn the election.

In late December 2020, a federal lawsuit was filed against Pence by Republican congressman Louie Gohmert and 11 Arizona Republicans who would have become presidential electors had Trump actually won Arizona. The plaintiffs sought to give the vice president the power to reject state certified presidential electors in favour of "competing slates of electors" so that Biden's victory over Trump could be overturned. The United States Department of Justice represented Pence in this case, and argued for its dismissal, stating that the lawsuit was a "walking legal contradiction" because it sought to grant power to the vice president, while suing the vice president. Within a week, the lawsuit was dismissed in the United States District Court for the Eastern District of Texas, and the appeal was rejected by a United States Court of Appeals for the Fifth Circuit panel, both due to the plaintiffs' lack of standing. Gohmert then appealed to the Supreme Court, which on January 7 tersely "denied" his petition.

== January 6, 2021 United States Capitol attack ==
In January 2021, Trump began to pressure Pence to take action to overturn the election. On January 5, after Vice President Mike Pence refused to participate in the fake electors plot, Trump warned that he would have to publicly criticize him. This prompted Pence's chief of staff to become concerned for Pence's safety and to alert Pence's Secret Service detail to the perceived threat. At 3:23 a.m. on the morning of January 6, QAnon leader Ron Watkins posted a tweet accusing Pence of orchestrating a coup against Trump and linked to a blog post which called for "the immediate arrest of [Pence], for treason". Encouraged by Trump, on January 5 and 6, thousands of his supporters gathered in Washington, D.C., to support his false claims that the 2020 election had been stolen.

As vice president, Pence presided over the January 6, 2021, congressional joint session to count the electoral votes—normally a non-controversial, ceremonial event. In the days leading up to the session, Trump declared both in public and in private that Pence should use that position to overturn the election results in swing states and declare Trump–Pence the winners of the election. Pence demurred that the United States Constitution did not give him that power, but Trump falsely insisted that "The Vice President and I are in total agreement that the Vice President has the power to act." According to The New York Times, multiple sources claim that Trump called Pence before he departed to certify the results urging him again one last time ultimately telling him, "You can either go down in history as a patriot, or you can go down in history as a pussy." Before the start of the Joint Session, Pence stated in a "Dear Colleague" letter that the Constitution prevented him from deciding which electoral votes counted and which did not. According to Politico, Pence was inspired by Al Gore presiding over his own defeat twenty years earlier during the 2000 presidential election, when Pence was a newly-elected member of Congress.

On January 6, 2021, the day on which a joint session of Congress met to count and certify the results of the Electoral College for the 2020 presidential election, Trump held a rally at which he urged listeners to go to the Capitol and repeatedly expressed the hope that Pence would "do the right thing". Many listeners then marched to the Capitol and stormed it. At 2:24, while Pence was in hiding in the Capitol, Trump tweeted that Pence "didn't have the courage to do what should have been done". Trump followers on far-right social media called for Pence to be hunted down, and the mob began chanting, "Where is Pence?" and "Find Mike Pence!" Outside, the mob chanted, "Hang Mike Pence!", which some crowds continued to chant as they stormed the Capitol; at least three rioters were overheard by a reporter as saying that they wanted to find Pence and execute him as a "traitor" by hanging him from a tree outside the building. One official recalled that: "The members of the [Vice President's Secret Service detail] at this time were starting to fear for their own lives... they're screaming and saying things like 'say goodbye to the family'". Alerted by a staffer to the threat against Pence, Trump reportedly replied "So what?". According to witnesses, White House chief of staff Mark Meadows told coworkers that Trump complained about Pence being escorted to safety and then stated something suggesting that Pence should be hanged. Pence later argued that Trump's "reckless words endangered my family and everyone at the Capitol that day".

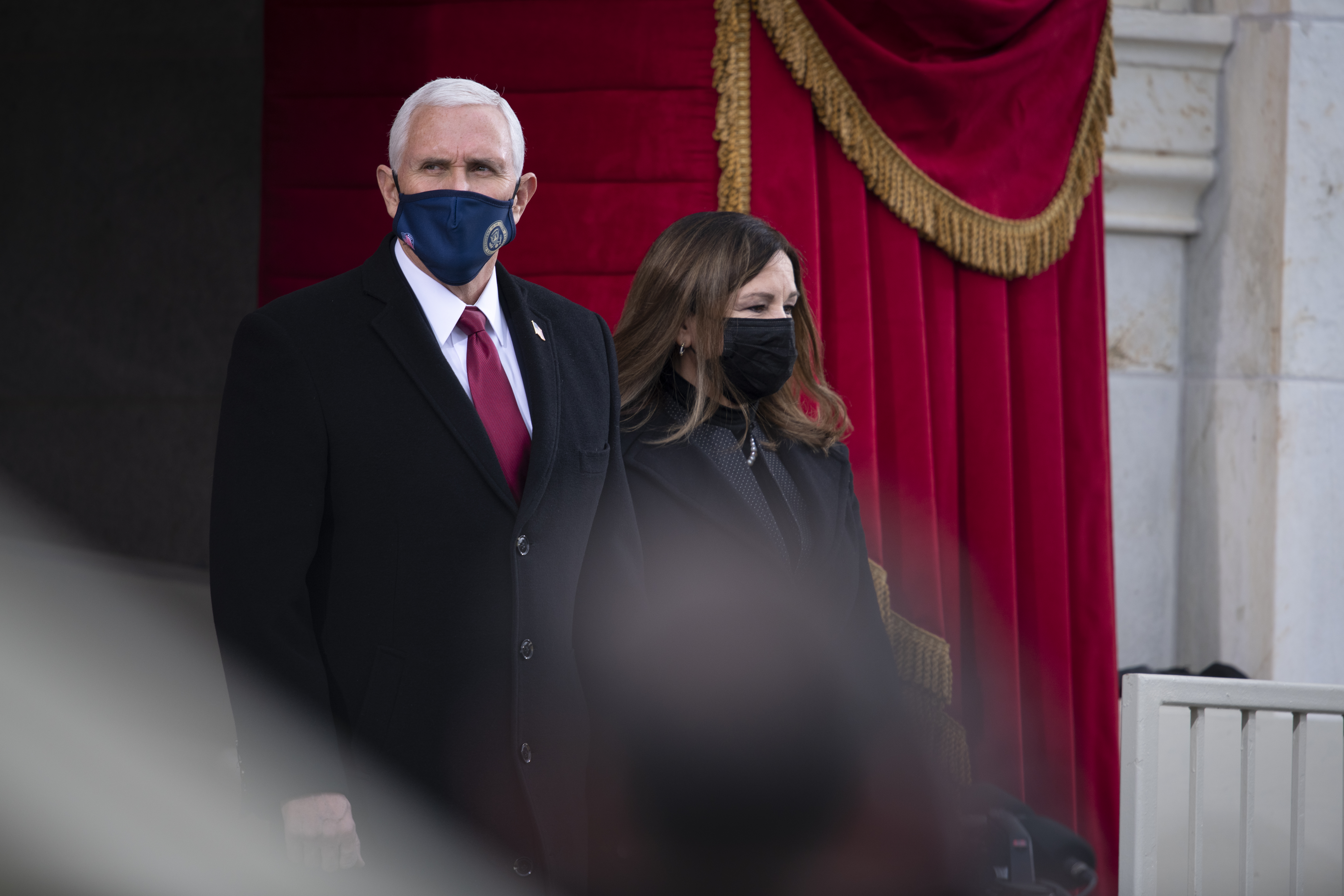
Pence and his wife Karen at the inauguration of Joe Biden.

On January 15, The Washington Post reported that Pence came "dangerously close" to the rioters during their occupation of the Capitol. Pence was not evacuated from the Senate chambers until 14 minutes after the initial breach of the Capitol was reported. He and his family were eventually ushered from the Senate chambers into a second-floor hideaway. One minute later, the mob rushed onto a stair landing only 100 feet away, from which they could have seen him enter the room if they had arrived a minute earlier. After his evacuation from the Senate chambers, his Secret Service detail wanted to move him away from the Capitol building but he refused to get in the car. Pence later approved the deployment of the National Guard, which raised questions as the vice president is not the commander-in-chief. After the Capitol was cleared, Congress resumed its joint session, and officially certified the election results with Pence declaring Biden and Harris the winners.

During the siege, Trump criticized Pence as lacking "courage". Earlier L. Lin Wood, a lawyer associated with Trump, had called for Pence to be "executed" by "firing squad". In spite of the threats against Pence, Trump never reached out to Pence or inquired about his safety during the attack on the Capitol, according to sources close to the vice president. Aides believed that Pence was being set up as a scapegoat for Trump's failure to overturn the results of the election. Pence was described as very angry with Trump. The two did not speak for several days, until January 11 when they met at the White House to discuss the prior week's Capitol siege and the final days of their administration.

On January 20, Pence attended the inauguration of Joe Biden as president of the United States, unlike Trump. Afterwards, he left the Capitol with his successor, Kamala Harris.

== Elections during the Pence vice presidency ==
Congressional party leaders
		Senate leaders		House leaders	
Congress	Year	Majority	Minority	Speaker	Minority
115th	2017–2018	McConnell	Schumer	Ryan	Pelosi
116th	2019–2020	McConnell	Schumer	Pelosi	McCarthy
117th (Note: 17 days of the 115th Congress (January 3, 2017 – January 19, 2017) took place under Vice President Biden, and 17 days of the 117th Congress (January 3, 2021 – January 19, 2021) took place during Pence's vice presidency, with the Republicans also briefly have held a majority in the Senate until January 20, 2021.)	2021	McConnell (Note: The Congress began with 51 Republicans, 48 Democrats (including 2 independents who caucus with the Democrats) and 1 vacancy in the Senate. Georgia's class 2 seat was vacant from the start until Democrat Jon Ossoff was seated January 20, 2021. Georgia's class 3 Republican interim appointee Kelly Loeffler served until Democrat Raphael Warnock was also seated on January 20, 2021. The Republicans also briefly have held a majority in the Senate until January 20, 2021.)	Schumer	Pelosi	McCarthy

Republican seats in Congress
Congress	Senate	House
115th	52	241
116th	53	200
117th	51	211 (Note: The Congress began with 211 Republicans, 222 Democrats and 2 vacancies in the House. Louisiana's 5th district seat was vacant due to the death of Republican member elect Luke Letlow before the term started. New York's 22nd district seat was also vacant due to the disputed election until Republican Claudia Tenney would later be declared a winner and sworn in February 11, 2021.)

== Post-vice presidency (2021–present) ==
=== 2024 presidential campaign ===
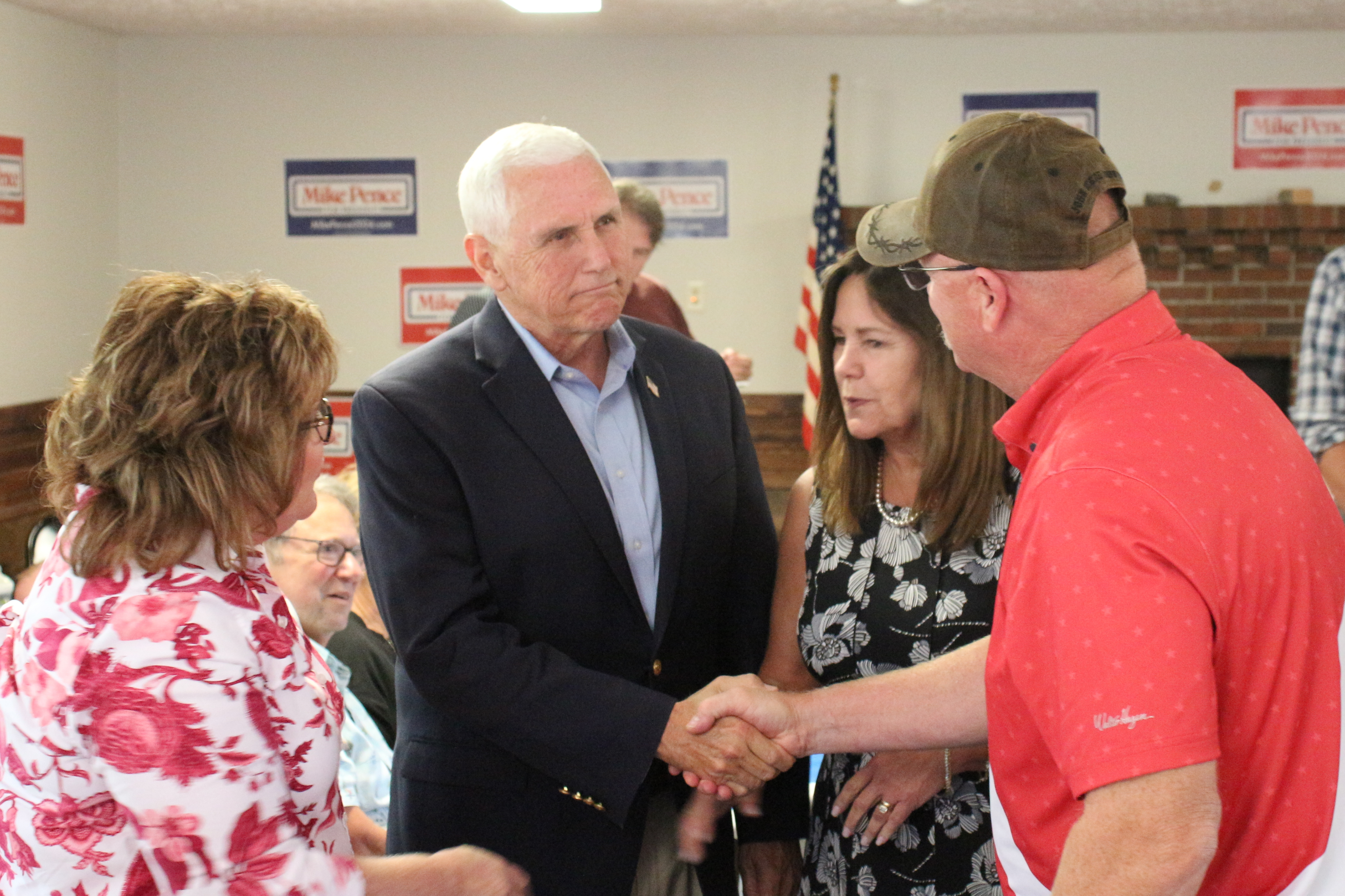
Pence greeting supporters in Iowa, July 2023

On June 5, 2023, Pence filed paperwork and officially launched his bid for the presidency. In July, Pence became the first 2024 Republican presidential candidate to visit Ukraine, where he met President Volodymyr Zelenskyy.

On October 28, 2023, Pence, who had weak fundraising and poll numbers, withdrew from the race. Much of his campaigning had taken place in Iowa. On March 15, 2024, Pence announced that he would not endorse Trump, nor would he support Biden in the 2024 presidential election. Pence did not attend the 2024 Republican National Convention. On August 9, 2024, Pence reiterated that he would not endorse Trump, nor would he support Kamala Harris after Biden withdrew from the race.

=== Awards ===
Pence was the 2025 recipient of the Profile in Courage Award from the John F. Kennedy Presidential Library and Museum.

=== Books authored ===
Pence has authored three books since leaving the vice presidency in 2021: memoir So Help Me God (2022), life advice book Go Home for Dinner: Advice on How Faith Makes a Family and Family Makes a Life (2023), and political manifesto What Conservatives Believe: Rediscovering the Conservative Conscience (2026).

== See also ==
- First presidency of Donald Trump
- Electoral history of Mike Pence
- Political positions of Mike Pence
- Vice presidency of JD Vance (second presidency of Donald Trump)
- Presidential transition of Joe Biden
