= So Help Me God (disambiguation) =

"So help me God" is a phrase by which one may swear an oath.

So Help Me God may also refer to:

- "So Help Me God" (Quantum Leap), a 1989 television episode
- So Help Me God (book), a 2022 autobiography by Mike Pence
- So Help Me God!, a 2020 album by 2 Chainz
- So Help Me God (Brantley Gilbert album), 2022
- So Help Me God, an unreleased album by Kanye West, later adapted into 2016's The Life of Pablo
- "So Help Me God", a song by DC Talk from the album Jesus Freak, 1995
- So Help Me God, a play by Maurine Dallas Watkin; see 2010 Drama Desk Award
- So Help Me God, a 1955 novel by Felix Jackson
