= Bennecke =

Bennecke is a surname. Notable people with the surname include:

- Heinrich Bennecke (1902–1972), German Nazi Party leader
- Paul Bennecke (born 1978), American political consultant
