= Republican Governors Association =

Organization of U.S. Republican governors

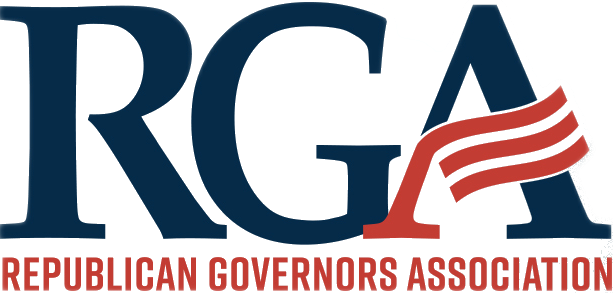
- Chair: Greg Gianforte (MT)
- Vice Chair: Tate Reeves (MS)
- Policy Chair: Bill Lee (TN)
- Founded: 1961; 65 years ago
- Headquarters: 1747 Pennsylvania Avenue NW, Suite 250; Washington, DC 20006
- Affiliated: Republican Party
- State governors: 26 / 50
- Territorial governors: 2 / 5
- Federal district mayorship: 0 / 1

Website
- rga.org

The Republican Governors Association (RGA) is a Washington, D.C.–based 527 organization founded in 1961, consisting of U.S. state and territorial Republican governors. Its primary objective is to help elect and support Republican governors.

The RGA's Executive Committee for 2024 includes Governors Eric Holcomb of Indiana, Greg Abbott of Texas, Greg Gianforte of Montana, Sarah Huckabee Sanders of Arkansas, Tate Reeves of Mississippi, Henry McMaster of South Carolina, Kristi Noem of South Dakota, Kim Reynolds of Iowa, and Glenn Youngkin of Virginia. In November of that year, Governor Brian Kemp of Georgia was elected Chairman, Governor Greg Gianforte of Montana was elected Vice Chairman, and Governor Henry McMaster of South Carolina was elected Policy Chairman.

Its Democratic counterpart is the Democratic Governors Association. The RGA is not directly affiliated with the non-partisan National Governors Association.

== List of current Republican governors ==
All of the following states are members of the Republican Governors Association:

Current governor	State	Past	Took office	Current term
Kay Ivey	Alabama	List	2017 (succeeded)	Second term (elected to first full term in 2018; term-limited in 2026)
Mike Dunleavy	Alaska	List	2018	Second term (term-limited in 2026)
Sarah Huckabee Sanders	Arkansas	List	2023	First term
Ron DeSantis	Florida	List	2019	Second term (term-limited in 2026)
Brian Kemp	(Georgia (U.S. state)) Georgia	List	2019	Second term (term-limited in 2026)
Brad Little	Idaho	List	2019	Second term
Mike Braun	Indiana	List	2025	First term
Kim Reynolds	Iowa	List	2017 (succeeded)	Second term (elected to first full term in 2018; retiring in 2026)
Jeff Landry	Louisiana	List	2024	First term
Tate Reeves	Mississippi	List	2020	Second term (term-limited in 2027)
Mike Kehoe	Missouri	List	2025	First term
Greg Gianforte	Montana	List	2021	First term
Jim Pillen	Nebraska	List	2023	First term
Joe Lombardo	Nevada	List	2023	First term
Kelly Ayotte	New Hampshire	List	2025	First term (two-year term)
Kelly Armstrong	North Dakota	List	2024	First term
Mike DeWine	Ohio	List	2019	Second term (term-limited in 2026)
Kevin Stitt	Oklahoma	List	2019	Second term (term-limited in 2026)
Henry McMaster	South Carolina	List	2017	Second term (elected to first full term in 2018; term-limited in 2026)
Larry Rhoden	South Dakota	List	2025 (succeeded)	First term
Bill Lee	Tennessee	List	2019	Second term (term-limited in 2026)
Greg Abbott	Texas	List	2015	Third term
Spencer Cox	Utah	List	2021	Second term
Phil Scott	Vermont	List	2017	Fifth term (two-year term)
Patrick Morrisey	West Virginia	List	2025	First term
Mark Gordon	Wyoming	List	2019	Second term (term-limited in 2026)

In addition to governors of U.S. states, the RGA also offers membership to Republican governors of U.S. territories.

Current governor	Territory	Past	Took office	Current term
Pula Nikolao Pula	American Samoa	List	2025	First term
Jenniffer González-Colón	Puerto Rico	List	2025	First term

== List of RGA chairs ==
Term	Chair	State
1963–1966	Robert E. Smylie	Idaho
1966–1967	John Love	Colorado
1967–1968	John Chafee	Rhode Island
1968–1969	Ronald Reagan	California
1969–1970	Raymond P. Shafer	Pennsylvania
1970–1971	Louie Nunn	Kentucky
1971–1972	William Milliken	Michigan
1972–1973	Linwood Holton	Virginia
1973–1974	Winfield Dunn	Tennessee
1974–1975	Kit Bond	Missouri
1975–1976	Arch Moore	West Virginia
1976–1977	Robert Bennett	Kansas
1977–1978	Robert Ray	Iowa
1978–1979	Otis Bowen	Indiana
1979–1980	Richard Snelling	Vermont
1980–1981	John Dalton	Virginia
1981–1982	Jim Thompson	Illinois
1982–1983	Robert Orr	Indiana
1983–1984	Vic Atiyeh	Oregon
1984–1985	Dick Thornburgh	Pennsylvania
1985–1986	John Sununu	New Hampshire
1986–1987	Tom Kean	New Jersey
1987–1988	Mike Castle	Delaware
1988–1989	Mike Hayden	Kansas
1989–1990	John Ashcroft	Missouri
1990–1991	Carroll Campbell	South Carolina
1991–1992	Tommy Thompson	Wisconsin
1992–1993	George Voinovich	Ohio
1993–1994	Jock McKernan	Maine
1994–1995	Mike Leavitt	Utah
1995–1996	John Engler	Michigan
1996–1997	Terry Branstad	Iowa
1997–1998	David Beasley	South Carolina
1998–1999	Frank Keating	Oklahoma
1999–2000	Ed Schafer	North Dakota
2000–2001	Jim Gilmore	Virginia
2001	Tom Ridge	Pennsylvania
2001–2002	John Rowland	Connecticut
2002–2003	Bill Owens	Colorado
2003–2004	Bob Taft	Ohio
2004–2005	Kenny Guinn	Nevada
2005–2006	Mitt Romney	Massachusetts
2006–2007	Sonny Perdue	(Georgia (U.S. state)) Georgia
2007–2008	Rick Perry	Texas
2008–2009	Mark Sanford	South Carolina
2009–2010	Haley Barbour	Mississippi
2010–2011	Rick Perry	Texas
2011–2012	Bob McDonnell	Virginia
2012–2013	Bobby Jindal	Louisiana
2013–2014	Chris Christie	New Jersey
2014–2015	Bill Haslam	Tennessee
2015–2016	Susana Martinez	New Mexico
2016–2017	Scott Walker	Wisconsin
2017–2018	Bill Haslam	Tennessee
2018–2019	Pete Ricketts	Nebraska
2019–2020	Greg Abbott	Texas
2020–2021	Doug Ducey	Arizona
2021–2022	Doug Ducey; Pete Ricketts	Arizona; Nebraska
2022–2023	Kim Reynolds	Iowa
2023–2024	Bill Lee	Tennessee
2024–2025	Brian Kemp	(Georgia (U.S. state)) Georgia
2025–present	Greg Gianforte	Montana

=== Executive directors ===
Term	Director
1963–1964	Robert McCall
1966	Carl McMurray
1967–1969	Richard Fleming
1971–1975	Buehl Berentson
1976–1980	Ralph Griffith
1980–1981	Ronald Rietdorf
1981	John Stevens
1982–1985	Carol Whitney
1985–1991	Michele Davis
1991–1995	Chris Henick
1995–1996	Paul Hatch
1996	LeAnne Wilson
1997	Brian Kennedy
1997–2000	Clinton Key
2000–2001	Michael McSherry
2001	Duncan Campbell
2001–2002	Clinton Key
2002–2004	Edward Tobin
2004–2005	Mike Pieper
2005–2006	Phillip Musser
2006–2011	Nick Ayers
2011–2014	Phil Cox
2014–2018	Paul Bennecke
2019–2022	Dave Rexrode
2023–present	Sara Craig Gongol

== Election cycles ==
=== 2018 ===
36 gubernatorial races occurred during the 2018 election cycle. The elections were held on November 6, 2018, with Republicans losing a net of 7 governorships.

In 2017, it sponsored a website The Free Telegraph to promote issues from the perspective of Republicans.

=== 2020 ===
In the 2020 election cycle, 11 states and two territories held elections for governors. The elections were held on November 3, 2020, with Republicans gaining a net of one governorship, Montana, for state elections. This marked the first time Montana elected a Republican governor in 16 years. Former Governor Wanda Vázquez Garced, who was a member of the Republican Governors Association, lost reelection in Puerto Rico, meaning a net loss of one Republican governor for territorial elections.

=== 2022 ===
36 gubernatorial races occurred during the 2022 election cycle. The elections were held on November 8, 2022, with Republicans losing a net of 2 governorships and lost all territorial governorships.

=== 2023 ===
3 gubernatorial races occurred during the 2023 election cycle including Louisiana where Republican Jeff Landry was elected to succeed term-limited Democrat John Bel Edwards and took office in January 2024.

== Fundraising ==
In the 18 months ending June 30, 2010, the RGA raised $58 million, while its counterpart DGA raised $40 million. "Unlike the national political parties and federal candidates, the governors' associations can take in unlimited amounts from corporations," according to Bloomberg, which notes that the RGA recently received $1 million from Rupert Murdoch's News Corporation, the parent corporation of Fox News, and $500,000 from WellPoint (now Anthem).

In 2018, the Republican Governors Association announced that $63.2 million was raised in all of 2017, including $27.2 million raised in the final six months of the year, setting a new fundraising record that significantly eclipses the $52.5 million raised in 2013, the last comparable year.
