= The Free Telegraph =

American political website

The Free Telegraph is an online publication sponsored by the Republican Governors Association of the United States. The RGA did not initially disclose its involvement in the site, prompting critics to label the site as propaganda. The URL was registered on July 7, 2017, and began publishing that month.
