= Steve Ricchetti =

American political adviser and lobbyist (born 1957)

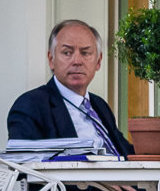
- Ricchetti in 2021

Counselor to the President
- In office January 20, 2021 – January 20, 2025
- President: Joe Biden
- Preceded by: Hope Hicks; Derek Lyons
- Succeeded by: Alina Habba; Peter Navarro

Chief of Staff to the Vice President
- In office December 1, 2013 – January 20, 2017
- Vice President: Joe Biden
- Preceded by: Bruce Reed
- Succeeded by: Josh Pitcock

White House Deputy Chief of Staff for Operations
- In office October 20, 1998 – January 20, 2001
- President: Bill Clinton
- Preceded by: John Podesta
- Succeeded by: Joe Hagin

Personal details
- Born: c. 1957 (age 68–69)
- Party: Democratic
- Spouse: Amy Ricchetti
- Children: 4
- Education: Miami University (BA); George Mason University (JD)

Steven John Ricchetti (/rɪˈʃɛti/ rish-ET-ee; born c. 1957) is an American political aide who last served as a Counselor to the President under President Joe Biden. He was the chairman of Joe Biden's 2020 presidential campaign. Ricchetti previously served as Chief of Staff to Vice President Biden during the Obama administration and Deputy Chief of Staff for Operations under President Bill Clinton. In between stints in Democratic administrations, Ricchetti has worked as a lobbyist.

== Early life and education ==
Steven J. Ricchetti grew up in Westlake, Ohio and graduated from Westlake High School.

He received his undergraduate degree from Miami University in Ohio (where he served as student body president) in 1979, and his Juris Doctor from the George Mason University School of Law.

== Career ==
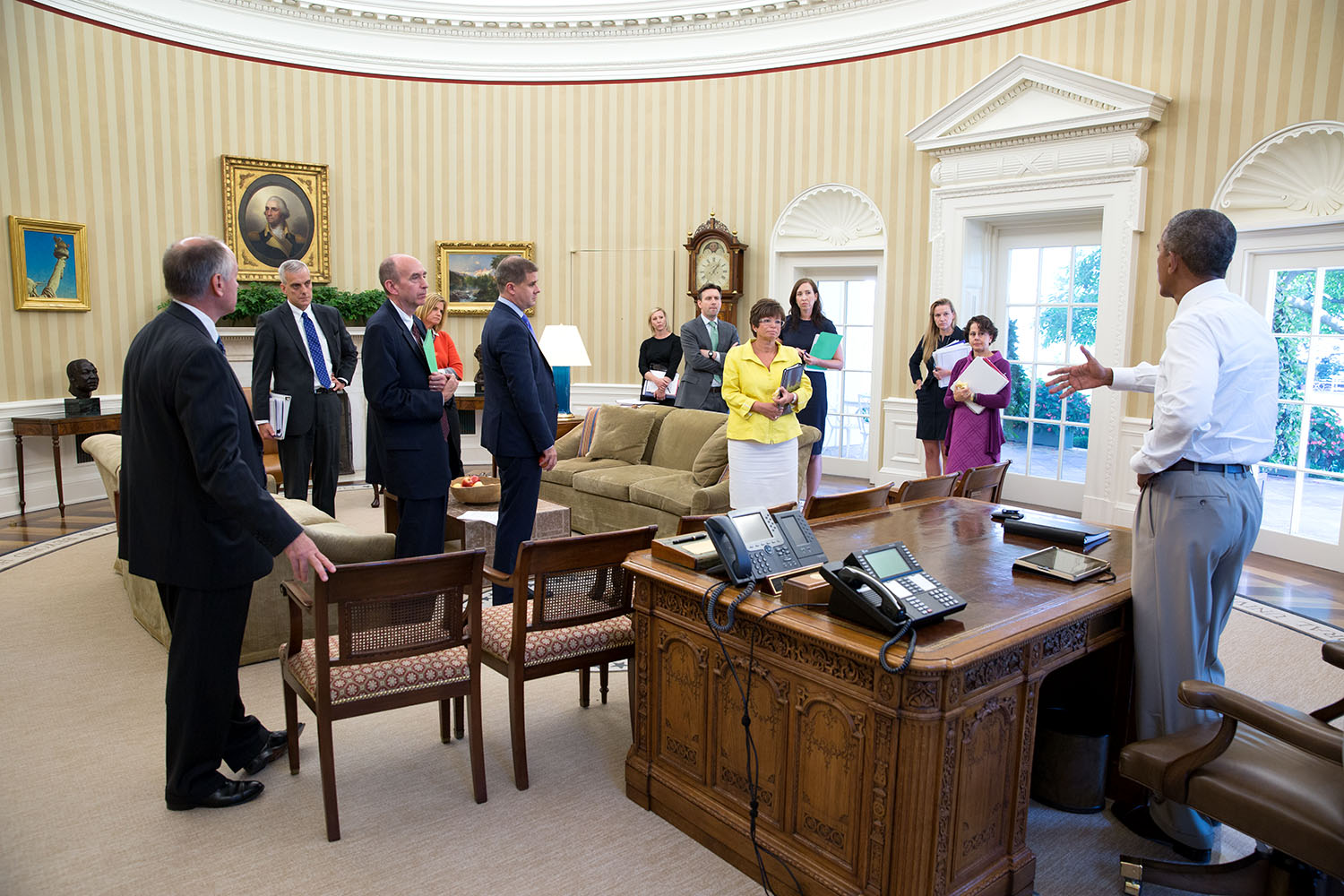
Ricchetti (left) in the Oval Office with senior White House advisors, 2014

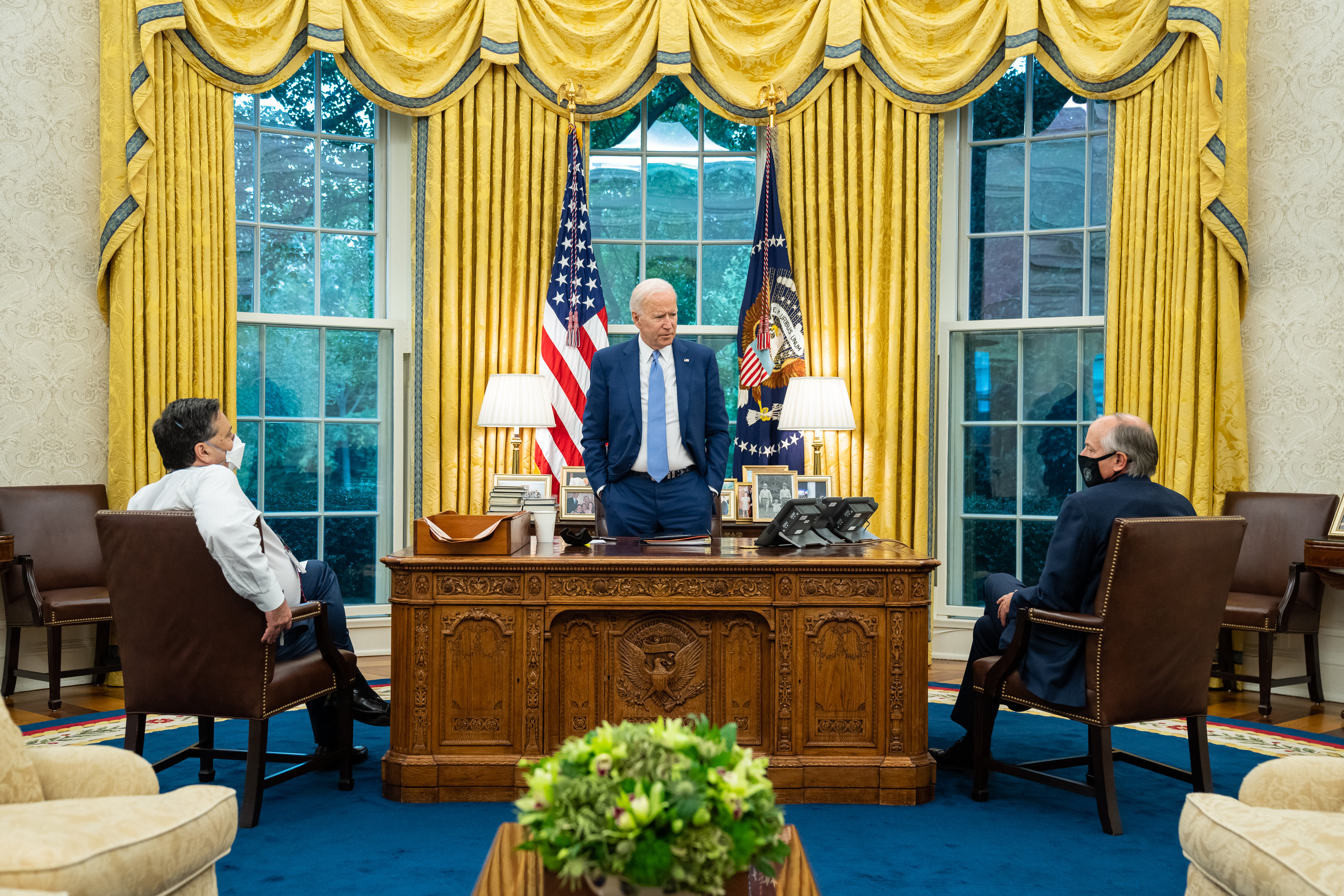
Ricchetti with President Joe Biden and Ron Klain in the Oval Office, 2021

Ricchetti led the Blue Cross and Blue Shield Association's political department from 1987 to 1989 and was executive director of the Democratic Senatorial Campaign Committee from 1990 to 1992. In the latter role, Ricchetti oversaw the upset victory of Democratic candidate Harris Wofford in the 1991 special election for Senate in Pennsylvania.

From January 1993 to February 1996, he was a White House staffer in the Clinton administration, holding the title of Deputy Assistant to the President for Legislative Affairs. In this role, Ricchetti was President Clinton's principal liaison to the Senate. Ricchetti conducted work for the administration on the economic recovery act of 1993, the Telecommunications Act of 1996, and other legislation.

From 1996 to 1998, Ricchetti was in the private sector, engaged in lobbying for clients at the governmental relations firm Public Strategies Washington (PSW). In September 1998, he returned to the White House, where he was tasked with handling relations with congressional Democrats amidst the impeachment proceedings against Clinton. In January 1999, Ricchetti became deputy White House chief of staff (succeeding John Podesta) and gained a larger portfolio. In 2000, Ricchetti was appointed to President Clinton's task force on China PNTR (permanent normalized trade relations) during the president's last year. Along with Commerce Secretary William M. Daley, Ricchetti "led the Administration's successful campaign to secure permanent normal trade relations with China" and coordinated with leaders of major U.S. corporations, such as Boeing, American Online and Intel to "sell the benefits of the trade accord to Congress and the public.”

In January 2001, Ricchetti founded and ran Ricchetti, Inc., a government relations (lobbying) and political consulting firm, with his brother Jeff Ricchetti. Over the following years, Ricchetti's firm represented a number of clients, including AT&T, Eli Lilly & Co., the American Hospital Association, United Technologies, the American Council of Life Insurers and the American Bankers Association.

In March 2012 he was appointed to be counselor to Vice President Joe Biden. Ricchetti had deregistered as a congressional lobbyist in late 2008 shortly after the election of Obama and Biden to the presidency and vice presidency, respectively. Ricchetti's appointment was controversial due to President Obama's promise to not appoint lobbyists and his issuance of "a tough new ethics policy meant to curb the revolving door between his administration and K street." Because Ricchetti had not lobbied personally for over two years, he did not require a waiver from the administration's policy. A statement from Biden's office in 2012 said that since 2008, Ricchetti had "advised clients on public policy, communications strategy, and grassroots efforts but did not act as a lobbyist with the federal government on behalf of any client." The Washington Post reported Ricchetti earned $1.8 million from his firm, Ricchetti Inc., the year before his appointment, and was owed another $217,000 from work he completed the same year as his appointment. In December 2013, Ricchetti succeeded Bruce Reed as chief of staff to the vice president, with the rank of Assistant to the President.

Ricchetti was the chief planner for a possible Biden run in the 2016 presidential election. (Biden ultimately decided not to run.)

Ricchetti was the chairman of Biden's presidential campaign in the 2020 elections, leading the campaign's efforts to raise funds from Wall Street financiers.

On November 16, 2020, it was announced that Ricchetti would become a Counselor to the President in the incoming Biden administration. He acted as an intermediary for Biden administration officials and lawmakers who sought access to the President according to an investigative report by the Wall Street Journal.

Ricchetti, along with Shalanda Young and Louisa Terrell, was tapped to lead the Democratic side in negotiations over the 2023 United States debt-ceiling crisis. Representative Garret Graves, a key Kevin McCarthy ally and point person on debt and budget issues, was tapped to lead the Republican side.

In July 2024 he coordinated informing White House staff that Biden was withdrawing from the 2024 United States presidential election.

== Other activities ==
Ricchetti is on the board of advisors of the Center for Congress at Indiana University. He formerly served on the boards of the Center for American Progress, Trust for the National Mall, and Bloomberg Government before stepping down from those positions to take a post in Biden's office as Counselor to the Vice President.

== Personal life ==
Ricchetti lives in McLean, Virginia. He has four children with his wife, Amy. Three of his children also worked in the Biden administration: Daniel, a senior adviser in the State Department; J.J.; a special assistant in the Office of Legislative Affairs, and Shannon, a deputy associate director of the Office of the Social Secretary.

Political offices
Preceded by Bruce Reed	Chief of Staff to the Vice President; 2013–2017	Succeeded by Josh Pitcock
