= Great America Committee =

Political Action Committee of Mike Pence

- Formation: May 17, 2017; 9 years ago
- Founder: Mike Pence (Chairman)
- Founded at: McLean, Virginia
- Type: Political action committee
- Registration no.: FEC Committee ID #: C00640664
- Legal status: Active
- Purpose: Support political activities of Mike Pence
- Region served: United States
- Services: Fundraising for Republican political candidates
- Official language: English
- Key people: Nick Ayers; Marty Obst; Mike Adams; Matthew Morgan; Samantha Menh
- Affiliations: Mike Pence
- Website: greatamericacommittee.com

Great America Committee is a political action committee (PAC) registered by former Vice President of the United States Mike Pence on May 17, 2017. It is the first example of an active vice president creating such a type of political action committee while serving in office. Fox News noted Pence's action came only one day after reporting on the Comey memos led to the appointment of a special counsel in the investigation into Russian interference in the 2016 United States elections.

Politico reported on the unusual nature of a vice president forming their own PAC, when they normally rely on their political party. NBC News said it was the first time a vice president took such an action. TheStreet.com called it "unprecedented" and "awkwardly-timed". Nine News observed the PAC was registered "amid the chaos" of the Trump administration. Bloomberg News and Nine News pointed out that both Joe Biden and Dick Cheney did not take such an action while serving as vice president. Salon noted this type of PAC was used by both Marco Rubio and Ted Cruz as a tactic to launch their bids for president. Vanity Fair reported the action taken by Pence was an attempt to take control of his potential future during growing political talk of efforts to impeach Donald Trump.

== History ==
On May 17, 2017, Robert Mueller was appointed by the United States Department of Justice as a special prosecutor to investigate Russian interference in the 2016 United States elections. On the same day, Great America Committee was registered with the Federal Election Commission. The PAC began with staffing from Pence associates Nick Ayers and Marty Obst. The PAC was formed with the intention of assisting the political campaigns of Republican members of the Congress in their election and re-election efforts. Money raised by the political action committee would be utilized to fund the costs of travel for Mike Pence aboard Air Force Two when he makes politically oriented trips in the United States. Funds from the Great America Committee would potentially be available to Pence if he wished to use them in his legal defense regarding the Russian interference in the Russia investigation.

As Mike Pence has not been vice president since 2021, according to Brett Kappel, an attorney specializing in campaign finance at Harmon, Curran, Spielberg & Eisenberg, since Mike Pence is not currently a candidate for federal office, he is legally permitted to utilize his PAC to direct donor funds into his personal accounts. However, Devin O'Malley, a spokesperson for Pence, stated that the former vice president has taken measures to prevent this, adhering to guidance from the Federal Election Commission (FEC) to ensure that PAC funds are not used for personal compensation.

== Analysis ==
Politico noted it was unusual for a vice president to start a political action committee in this manner during their tenure as vice president, and instead they normally fuse their fundraising activities with the Republican National Committee. NBC News reported it was the first instance of a political action committee of this nature being formed during an active vice president's tenure in their office. Fox News reported the political action committee was created "amid White House turmoil" and "after the so-called 'Comey memo' ricocheted through Washington and effectively resulted in the naming of a special counsel to probe what President Trump once called 'this Russia thing'". TheStreet.com called it an "unprecedented and awkwardly-timed political action committee".

Nine News reported the political action committee formation steps were taken "amid the chaos of the Trump administration". Bloomberg News and Nine News pointed out that both Joe Biden and Dick Cheney did not take such an action while serving as vice president. Salon noted these types of political action committees were utilized in the prior election season as a stepping off point to start a presidential campaign, and cited the campaigns of both Marco Rubio and Ted Cruz as recent examples. Vanity Fair reported that—amid growing talk of efforts to impeach Donald Trump—Pence "seemingly tried to take control of his political future [...] when he filed paperwork with the F.E.C. to launch his own PAC, the Great America Committee".

Center for Responsible Politics executive director Sheila Krumholz told Bloomberg News: "Launching a leadership PAC sometimes signals an intent to run for higher office, which in Pence’s case, has been a topic of public interest ever since he was first nominated".

== See also ==
- 2018 United States elections
- 2020 United States elections
