= Paul Bennecke =

American political consultant

Paul N. Bennecke (born 1978) is an American political consultant for candidates of the Republican Party and partner in the Atlanta-based public-affairs firm, Connect South. He is the former executive director of the Republican Governors Association (RGA). He was appointed to that position in December 2014 and ended his term on December 31, 2018. Previously, he served as deputy executive director and political director of the RGA from January 2007 to January 2011 and led two US Senate campaigns for David Perdue.

== Early years and Georgia GOP takeover ==
Bennecke was born in Chattanooga, Tennessee, and attended Dalton State College before transferring to the University of Georgia. At age 21, he was selected as an alternate delegate to the 2000 Republican National Convention in Philadelphia. At age 23, he served as political director for the campaign to elect St. Sen. Sonny Perdue to the Georgia Governorship. Perdue won despite being heavily outspent by incumbent Democrat Roy Barnes. Subsequently, he was named political director and later executive director of the Georgia Republican Party, serving under chairman Alec Poitevint. During this 2003-06 period at the Georgia GOP, Republicans seized control of the State House of Representatives (a net gain of 34 seats) and the State Senate (a net gain of eight seats). The party also elected a Lieutenant Governor and Secretary of State, as well as re-elected Perdue in 2006, the first Republican in 134 years to serve as Governor.

== RGA - Partnership with Ayers, 2007-10 ==
Throughout these years, Bennecke had worked with Nick Ayers, Perdue's 2006 campaign manager. Perdue was elected to a one-year stint as RGA Chairman, and he named Ayers as executive director and Bennecke as political director (later given the additional title of deputy executive director). The two young Georgians conceived an unprecedented four-year plan to professionalize the committee's operation and implement a long-range strategy, leading up to the 2010 midterm elections, when 37 Governors would be elected.

Their plan was accepted by the governors, Ayers, and Bennecke served through four gubernatorial cycles encompassing all 50 states. When the two began at RGA, Republicans were reeling from a terrible 2006 cycle and held only 22 statehouses. When they left in early 2011, the GOP held 29 Governorships, a net gain of seven (including Ohio, Michigan, New Jersey, Wisconsin, and Virginia). Bennecke oversaw a budget totaling $35 million in 2007–09, which rose to more than $100 million for 2010 alone.

== Independent consulting, 2011-14 ==
In the intervening years (2011–14), Bennecke founded his own political consulting firm (Red Clay Strategies), and also joined longtime friend and colleague Tony Simon at the Atlanta-based public-affairs firm, Connect South. In November 2013, Connect South affiliated itself with the Mississippi-based Capitol Resources LLC, whose partners include Henry Barbour. Their clients have included Fortune 500 companies, as well as the MARTA Board of Directors, the Georgia Retail Assn., and the Municipal Gas Assn. of Georgia. He also formed Jenson Strategic Partners LLC in 2013.

Bennecke spent much of 2011 in Virginia, where he directed a PAC affiliated with Governor Bob McDonnell in its mission to regain control of the Virginia State Senate. The GOP scored a net gain of two seats that November, achieving a 20–20 tie (allowing Lieutenant Governor Bill Bolling to cast tiebreaking votes in favor of the GOP for the next two years).

Continuing his work in the Old Dominion, Bennecke in March 2012 announced the formation of a federal SuperPAC, Independence Virginia PAC, whose sole purpose was to aid the bid of George F. Allen to the U.S. Senate. Allen ultimately lost his bid to Democrat Tim Kaine; Independence Virginia PAC spent $4.9 million to aid the Republican. Bennecke also worked for the independent America 360 Committee in Massachusetts to aid Sen. Scott Brown in his re-election effort; he was defeated by Democrat Elizabeth Warren. Bennecke's close cooperation in both races with Las Vegas billionaire GOP activist Sheldon Adelson was noted.

Republican setbacks in the 2013 Virginia statewide elections gave Democrats control of the State Senate through the ascension of Ralph Northam to the Lieutenant Governorship. Bennecke directed the campaign of B. Wayne Coleman to succeed Northam in the Democratic-leaning, Norfolk-based 6th District, falling short by 11 votes after a lengthy recount in January 2014. Persisting after the Coleman defeat months before, he directed the successful August 2014 special-election campaign of Ben Chafin to the Virginia State Senate, which returned complete control of the General Assembly to the Republicans.

Also in 2013 and for all of 2014, he served as general consultant to the David Perdue campaign for U.S. Senate in Georgia, guiding it to success through three hotly contested primary, runoff, and general elections. His 2014 independent-expenditure efforts aided winning candidates in Illinois and Tennessee; further, Bennecke was hired to direct the RGA's IE campaigns in support of GOP gubernatorial nominees in Massachusetts, Kansas, Idaho, and Georgia (all of whom were elected that November).

== RGA Executive Director, 2015-2018 ==
Bennecke's initial year as RGA Executive Director, 2015, saw a win in Kentucky (by outsider Matt Bevin) and an unexpected loss in Louisiana, as Senator David Vitter flamed out in scandal after a contentious all-party primary, and failed to recover.

The follow-up in 2016 was the challenge of a presidential year when Democrats typically swell the voting electorate and the wild card of the Donald Trump candidacy. RGA raised $60.7 million in cash—the most ever for a presidential year (besting the previous records from 2008 and 2012). Bennecke's RGA helped winning candidates take governorships in Missouri, New Hampshire, and Vermont from the Democrats while holding Indiana (vacated suddenly in July by Mike Pence). They suffered a net loss only in North Carolina (which went to a recount). The result was 33 Republican Governors, the most for the party since 1922, and one short of the record.

For the 2018 cycle, the RGA raised and spent a record $180 million when 38 gubernatorial elections were up. RGA won 20 of the 36 states in 2018 including battleground contests in Florida, Georgia, Ohio, Iowa, and Arizona. Despite huge headwinds for the GOP, unprecedented funding from democratic aligned groups, and a record number of open-seat and incumbent candidates; the RGA successfully held on to a majority of the states.

== Return to Georgia ==
Bennecke returned to Atlanta full-time after the 2018 cycle, resuming his work at Connect South. In April 2020, it was announced that he had again taken the job of general consultant to the David Perdue Senate campaign (same as he held in 2014). Perdue ultimately lost the runoff to Jon Ossoff in January 2021, after leading (though without a majority) in the November 2020 general election.

In August 2021, Bennecke and Ayers declined to sign on to the prospective Georgia Senate candidacy of ex-football player Herschel Walker.

== Personal life ==
Bennecke lives in Atlanta with his wife, the former Jennifer (Jen) Englert, and their three sons. Under Gov. Sonny Perdue, she served as the top assistant to Georgia First Lady Mary Perdue, as executive director of the Georgia Children's Trust Fund, and finally as executive director of the Governor's Office for Children and Families (GOCF). She was reappointed to the GOCF post by Governor Nathan Deal in 2011 but resigned that fall after the birth of their first child.
