= Josh Pitcock =

American political operative

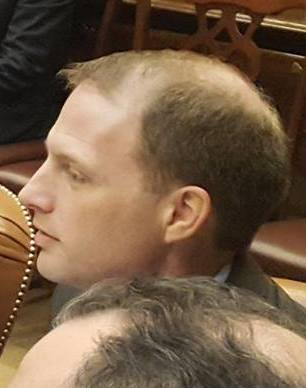
- Pitcock in 2017

Chief of Staff to the Vice President
- In office January 20, 2017 – July 28, 2017
- Vice President: Mike Pence
- Preceded by: Steve Ricchetti
- Succeeded by: Nick Ayers

Personal details
- Party: Republican
- Spouse: Katherine A. Seaman (m. 2007)
- Education: DePauw University (BA); Wake Forest University (JD)

Joshua Matthew Pitcock is an American political operative who served as chief of staff to Mike Pence, the Vice President of the United States, from January 2017 to July 2017. Pitcock has also been Assistant to the President. He was a member of Donald Trump's 2016 presidential transition team.

== Early life and education ==
In 1994, Pitcock graduated from Anderson High School in Anderson, Indiana. Pitcock was a political science major and Asian Studies minor at DePauw University, where he was a diver. He graduated from there in 1998. He went on to earn a J.D. degree from Wake Forest University.

== Career ==
Pitcock served as an aide to Mike Pence during his time in the United States House of Representatives and eventually became his chief of staff there. After Pence was elected governor of Indiana in 2012, Pitcock stayed in Washington, D.C. during Pence's governorship, serving as the state's lobbyist. Pitcock served as a senior policy adviser to Pence throughout the campaign and the transition. Having navigated the Hill with Pence before, he was seen as the natural choice to help Pence in his expected role as liaison between Congressional Republicans and the president.

=== Trump presidential transition team ===
Pitcock was a member of Donald Trump's presidential transition team. The transition team was a group of around 100 aides, policy experts, government affairs officials, and former government officials who were tasked with vetting, interviewing, and recommending individuals for top cabinet and staff roles in Trump's administration. He was part of the leadership staff.

=== Chief of Staff to the Vice President ===
In January 2017, Pitcock was appointed as Pence's chief of staff. Pitcock's tenure in the White House was always meant to be temporary, as he stayed on through the transition period and the first few months of the Trump administration, before stepping down during the summer. He was succeeded in the position by Nick Ayers, another longtime Pence advisor. In October 2017, Pitcock was appointed vice president of government affairs at Oracle, a multinational computer technology corporation based in California.

=== Personal life ===
Pitcock married Katherine A. Seaman on June 30, 2007, in Washington, D.C.

Political offices
Preceded by Steve Ricchetti	Chief of Staff to the Vice President; 2017	Succeeded by Nick Ayers
