= So Help Me God (book) =

2022 book by Mike Pence

- Author: Mike Pence
- Language: English
- Publisher: Simon & Schuster
- Publication date: November 15, 2022
- Pages: 560
- ISBN: 9781982190330

So Help Me God is a memoir by former Vice President of the United States, Mike Pence, published on November 15, 2022, by Simon & Schuster. The book chronicles Pence's life, his journey in politics, and his tenure as the 48th Vice President under President Donald Trump, providing insights into pivotal moments during his career and the first Trump administration.

== Background ==
Mike Pence, a former Congressman and Governor of Indiana, served as the 48th Vice President of the United States from 2017 to 2021. Known for his devout Christian faith and conservative principles, Pence became a prominent figure in the Republican Party during a particularly turbulent period in American politics. After leaving office, his relationship with former President Trump, particularly in the aftermath of the January 6 Capitol attack, became a focal point of public and political interest.

So Help Me God serves as Pence's reflection on his life, values, and the challenges he faced in public service. The title, drawn from the traditional oath of office, underscores his deep commitment to faith and duty.

== Content ==
The memoir is divided into several sections, tracing Pence's journey from his modest upbringing in Columbus, Indiana, to his rise in national politics. Key topics include:

=== Early life and career ===
Pence recounts his upbringing in a family of Irish Catholic Democrats and his eventual shift to evangelical Christianity and conservatism. He describes his early career in law, his entry into politics, and his service as a Congressman and Governor.

=== Vice presidency ===
The memoir provides a behind-the-scenes perspective on the Trump administration, detailing Pence's efforts to champion conservative policies, his role in advancing religious freedom, and his advocacy for issues such as tax reform and pro-life initiatives.

=== January 6, 2021 ===
One of the most anticipated sections of the book addresses the events surrounding the January 6 Capitol attack. Pence reflects on his decision to preside over the certification of the 2020 presidential election results despite intense pressure from Trump and his supporters, framing it as a duty to uphold the Constitution.

=== Faith and family ===
Throughout the book, Pence emphasises the importance of his faith and family. He shares personal anecdotes about his wife, Karen Pence, and their children, showcasing how his faith has guided his decisions in both his personal and professional life.

=== Vision for America ===
The final chapters outline Pence's vision for the future of the United States, focusing on his belief in limited government, individual liberty, and moral leadership.

== Reception ==
The memoir received mixed reviews from critics. Supporters of Pence praised the book for its candid and principled tone, particularly in its discussion of January 6 and Pence's commitment to constitutional integrity. Critics, however, questioned Pence's framing of his tenure in the Trump administration, suggesting he downplayed controversies to maintain his political aspirations.

So Help Me God was seen as a potential platform for Pence to reintroduce himself to the American electorate amid speculation about a possible 2024 presidential run, something that he eventually attempted.

== See also ==
- Go Home for Dinner: Advice on How Faith Makes a Family and Family Makes a Life (2023 book by Pence)
- What Conservatives Believe: Rediscovering the Conservative Conscience (2026 book by Pence)
