= Nick Ayers =

American political strategist (born 1982)

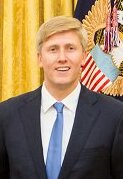
- Ayers in 2017

Chief of Staff to the Vice President
- In office July 28, 2017 – January 1, 2019
- Vice President: Mike Pence
- Preceded by: Josh Pitcock
- Succeeded by: Marc Short

Personal details
- Born: James Nicholas Ayers; August 16, 1982 (age 44) Cobb County, Georgia, U.S.
- Party: Republican
- Spouse: Jamie Floyd (m. 2005)
- Children: 3
- Education: Kennesaw State University (BA)

James Nicholas Ayers (born August 16, 1982) is an American political strategist and consultant who served as chief of staff to Vice President Mike Pence between July 2017 and January 2019. He had previously served as national chairman for Pence's vice-presidential campaign in 2016, as well as executive director of the Republican Governors Association from 2007 to 2010.

In 2010, Ayers was named as one of Time's 40 most influential people in politics under the age of 40. He also was principal of the lobbying firm C5 Creative Consulting, and is one of four leading figures in America First Policies, a pro-Trump nonprofit organization founded in January 2017. From November 2016 to January 2017, Ayers was a senior adviser to President-elect Donald Trump's transition team.

In December 2018, multiple news organizations described him as a leading contender to succeed John F. Kelly as White House Chief of Staff, but he decided not to take the job. Ayers also stated that he would leave the Trump administration by the end of the year.

== Early life and education ==
Ayers grew up in southern Cobb County, Georgia. In an interview with The New Republic in 2009, Ayers said his parents instilled in him a respect for public service from an early age; he recalled that in 1992, his parents voted for Bill Clinton and Ross Perot. Ayers described himself as being rather taken with President Clinton and then-Governor Zell Miller, a Democrat, in the 1990s.

Ayers graduated from South Cobb High School in 2000. He then went on to study at Kennesaw State University, where he eventually earned his B.A. in political science in 2009. Ayers also studied international and government affairs at the University of Surrey in Guildford, United Kingdom as a part of a study abroad program.

== Career in politics ==
=== College activism in Georgia and first campaign, 2001–2003 ===
While studying as an undergraduate, Ayers joined the College Republicans, becoming president of the school's chapter. During this time, he met Sonny Perdue, who at the time was planning to run for governor. Ayers was recruited by fellow College Republican Paul Bennecke to join Perdue's campaign and serve as Perdue's "body man," taking time off from Kennesaw State University to drive and provide advance for the then-State Senator. He had initially gone to college with the goal of becoming a banker, but his role with Perdue – part assistant, part adviser, part protégé – convinced him to launch a career in politics. "I had no interest in joining the campaign. I had my career planned out. I truly did not believe Governor Roy Barnes could be beat at the time", Ayers said. "After 10 minutes of talking to Sonny, I was one hundred percent confident he was the right person to run this state."

In 2002, Perdue was successful in unseating Democratic incumbent Roy Barnes, making him the first Republican governor of Georgia since Reconstruction.

"When we won, I had the option of basically being the senior adviser to a governor or a freshman in college", Ayers said later. "I chose the gubernatorial post." Studying nights and weekends, he worked on his college diploma over the next seven years, finally earning his Bachelor's in 2009.

=== Perdue re-election campaign, 2004–2006 ===
In 2004 at age 22, Ayers was named manager of Perdue's re-election committee. He was cited as one of the Republican Party's five "fastest rising stars in the nation" by the Atlanta Journal Constitution along with then-Louisiana Congressman Bobby Jindal. Two years later, Perdue was re-elected by a 20-point margin (in an otherwise Democratic year), with Ayers having served as manager for the entire campaign.

On October 25, 2006—days before the election—Ayers was stopped by the Georgia State Patrol for failure to maintain his lane, driving 50 mph in a 35-mph zone, and suspicion of drunk driving. Ayers himself admitted to consuming "a strong Jack (Daniels) and Coke", subsequently failed the field-sobriety test, and repeatedly refused to take a breathalyzer. He was cited for DUI; the charges were later reduced to reckless driving.

=== Republican Governors Association, 2007–2010 ===
Perdue was elected to a one-year stint as chairman of the Republican Governors Association, and he named Ayers as executive director and his longtime associate, Paul Bennecke, as political director (later given the additional title of deputy executive director). The two young Georgians conceived an unprecedented four-year plan to professionalize the committee's operation and implement a long-range strategy, leading up to the 2010 midterm elections, when 37 Governors would be elected.

Their plan was accepted by the governors, and Ayers and Bennecke served through four gubernatorial cycles encompassing all 50 states. At the beginning, Republicans were reeling from a terrible 2006 cycle, and held only 22 statehouses. When they left in early 2011, the GOP held 29 Governorships, a net gain of seven (including Ohio, Michigan, New Jersey, Wisconsin and Virginia).

When Ayers began his tenure, the RGA was a relatively spartan operation with a budget of $20 million, and a low national profile. By the time his tenure was over, the Governors had increased their operating budget to $135 million and the distinction of being the largest political action committee in 2010. This success led to Ayers quickly being labeled as a rising star and a political wunderkind.

=== RNC and Priebus, 2010–2011 ===
In November 2010, in the flush of RGA's victories, Ayers was touted as a potential replacement for Michael Steele as chairman of the Republican National Committee. However, he declined to seek the position, and instead assisted Reince Priebus of Wisconsin, the RNC's Treasurer, in his campaign. Ayers's work was interpreted as a de facto endorsement of Priebus (and rejection of Steele) by the GOP governors, several of whom reportedly instructed their RNC members to support the insurgent.

Following Priebus's election, Ayers agreed to serve with Ed Gillespie as the two leaders of the transition team for the RNC. The Washington Times reported in 2012 that the two "quickly made drastic cuts to the staff and overhead and undertook a thoughtful strategic analysis to forge a path forward. Together, they convinced top staffers to come to the RNC."

=== State and national consulting, 2011–2016 ===
After leaving the governors association, Ayers in March 2011 joined Target Enterprises, an ad-buying firm.

In June 2011, Ayers took a five-month hiatus to serve as the campaign manager for the presidential bid of Minnesota Gov. Tim Pawlenty. Ayers was reportedly courted by four other campaigns, and Pawlenty called him "without question one of the best political talents in America." However, after a major effort, Pawlenty failed to show well in early debates, lost the Iowa Straw Poll in September 2011, and quickly withdrew from the race, with a half-million-dollar debt. Ayers shouldered the blame: "I believe a campaign manager before, during, and after a campaign should accept responsibility and keep their mouth closed. So while there are always two sides to a story, mine won't be one of them."

After Pawlenty, Ayers resumed his duties as partner at Target. He started the political firm C5 Creative Consulting. And, in 2015, he created the firm Advance Media Capital, The firm bought air-time on TV stations in swing states months prior to the 2016 election, and then sought to sell this airtime to PACs close to election day. It was dissolved in 2017.

He returned to gubernatorial politics in 2013, when he recruited, and served as general consultant for, Bruce Rauner and his campaign in Illinois. The millionaire businessman was eventually elected, winning a contested primary with 40.1% and defeating incumbent Pat Quinn with 50.3% in November 2014. Rauner was the first Republican to win the Illinois governorship in 12 years, and the first political outsider in modern memory. Ayers also led independent SuperPAC Arkansas Horizon's efforts to help elect Tom Cotton of Arkansas and David Perdue of Georgia to the U.S. Senate in November 2014.

In late 2014, Ayers sold his interest in Target Enterprises and focused his efforts on political management (through C5 Creative Consulting) and investments (through Ayers Family Holdings). The Wall Street Journal and Wisconsin Watchdog revealed in October 2015 that the "John Doe" probe of pro-Scott Walker groups and individuals from 2011 to 2012, later deemed an unconstitutional invasion of privacy, had targeted Ayers's emails.

In 2016, he was involved as a strategist in several races, including that of Governor Mike Pence for re-election in Indiana and Eric Greitens for Governor of Missouri. When Pence abandoned his re-election campaign upon being designated as vice-presidential nominee, Ayers served as a leading strategist for his replacement, Eric Holcomb.

=== Pence-for-VP Chairman, 2016 ===
Ayers was the first Pence operative to whom Trump's team reached out, to begin the vice-presidential vetting process, and handled negotiations between the Indiana Governor and Trump. Within two weeks, Pence was named to the national ticket, and Ayers was named to chair the Pence effort, serving as a volunteer. (Trump campaign releases and some news stories used the title "Senior Adviser", but Ayers had the primary role in Pence's campaign.)

Ayers, Marc Short, and Josh Pitock formed the core team that prepared Pence for the July convention speech and the October vice presidential debate.

=== Transition and post-election activities ===
After the election, Ayers was named as a senior adviser to the Presidential Transition, part of the group replacing the earlier team headed by New Jersey Gov. Chris Christie. Again, as after the 2016 election, Ayers's name was prominently mentioned as a candidate for chairman of the Republican National Committee. Ayers made the final cut, with strong backing from Pence and presidential adviser Steve Bannon, but ended runner-up to Michigan's Ronna Romney McDaniel.

In January 2017, Ayers and three other Trump-Pence aides were named as principals of America First Policies, a new nonprofit organization dedicated to defending the Administration's policies.

Ayers was seen as playing an influential role in advising Trump to name two Georgians—Sonny Perdue and Congressman Tom Price—to the Cabinet. "Georgia walks away with two of the most consequential Cabinet secretaries who happen to be the two most qualified for the job," said Ayers. "It's a testament to the president's extraordinary decision making and his appreciation to Georgia."

In March 2017, BuzzFeed reported that Ayers was a major investor in Independent Journal Review, a news website geared to young conservatives, with phenomenal growth in recent years. Ayers does not exercise any editorial control over the site's content, it was reported. Ayers Family Holdings also provides seed capital to Georgia-based startups in the healthcare and technology industry, and reportedly has invested millions nationally in technology, financial services, and healthcare products.

Holmsted, LLC, another private Ayers firm, was founded in 2014 and invested millions in Georgia forestry and pecans.

=== Chief of Staff to the Vice President, 2017–2019 ===
On June 29, 2017, it was announced that Ayers would begin serving as Vice President Mike Pence's Chief of Staff. and he assumed office on July 28, 2017, replacing Josh Pitcock. Ayers announced he would depart the Trump-Pence administration at the end of 2018, in a tweet on December 9, 2018.

=== After Pence ===
In August 2020, Ayers and Donald Trump Jr. sought to block the Pebble Mine project in Alaska. Ayers wrote in an August 4 tweet that, similar to "millions of conservationists and sportsmen", he is hoping President Donald Trump will tell the Environmental Protection Agency to block the project, which has been a lightning rod for controversy for some two decades and has been widely assailed by numerous interest groups in Alaska and the lower states, and also faced opposition from many Alaskans.

== Personal life ==
Ayers lives in Atlanta with his wife Jamie (née Floyd), a former schoolteacher from Houston County, Georgia. They were married in May 2005. Mrs. Ayers is a second cousin of former Georgia Governor Sonny Perdue. The Ayerses have triplets, born in December 2012.

He serves on the board of directors (and is currently board secretary) of Leading the Way, an international Christian ministry, headed by Michael Youssef whose estimated worth is $5 million.

According to his financial disclosure reports, Ayers' net worth is between $12 million and $54 million. He owns farmland in Georgia worth between $2.5 million and $11 million.

Political offices
Preceded by Josh Pitcock	Chief of Staff to the Vice President; 2017–2019	Succeeded by Marc Short
