= Immanuel Christian School (Springfield, Virginia) =

Coordinates: 38°48′39″N 77°11′7″W

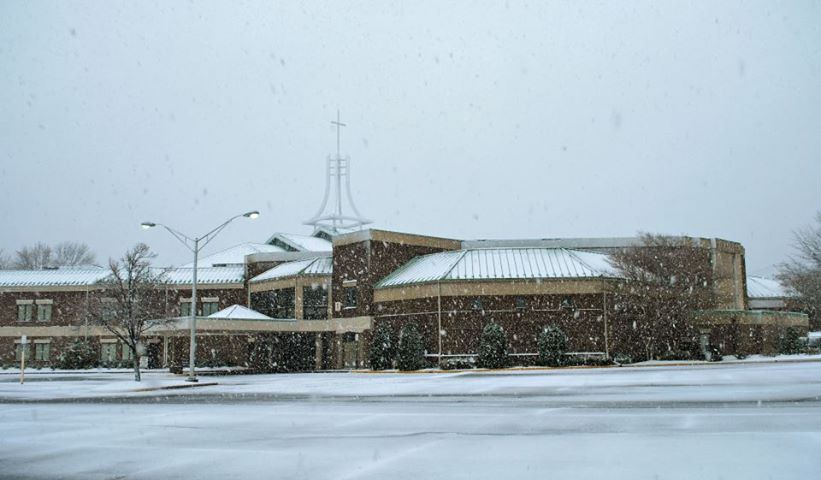
- Immanuel Bible Church and Immanuel Christian School

Location
- Springfield, Virginia; United States

Information
- Type: Private school
- Religious affiliation: Christian
- Established: 1976
- Head teacher: Stephen Danish
- Grades: K-12
- Enrollment: 469 (2019)
- Website: Official website

Immanuel Christian School is a private Christian school in Springfield, Virginia, 15 miles (24 km) from Washington, D.C., United States.

The school accepts students from kindergarten to the eight grade at its main campus. As of 2019, the school had 469 students; slightly less than half were non-white. The head of the school was Stephen Danish. The school has been recognized by the National Blue Ribbon Schools Program.

The school opened in 1976, but its roots date to 1966 with the groundbreaking for Immanuel Baptist Church in northern Virginia. In the fall of 2019, the school opened its high school in Alexandria, Virginia, by enrolling students in the 9th and 10th grades, announcing it would open 10th and 11th in the following two years.

In January 2019, Karen Pence, wife of the Vice President of the United States, Mike Pence, returned to teach art part-time, after a six-year absence from the school, where she previously taught for 12 years. A daughter of the Pence family graduated from Immanuel Christian.

The school's employment application requires an affirmation of Christian faith and bars moral misconduct, which it defines to include, among others, "homosexual or lesbian sexual activity, polygamy, transgender identity." The attention the school received as a result of this caused a media debate as to whether their policies are discriminatory.
