= Karen Pence =

Second Lady of the United States from 2017 to 2021

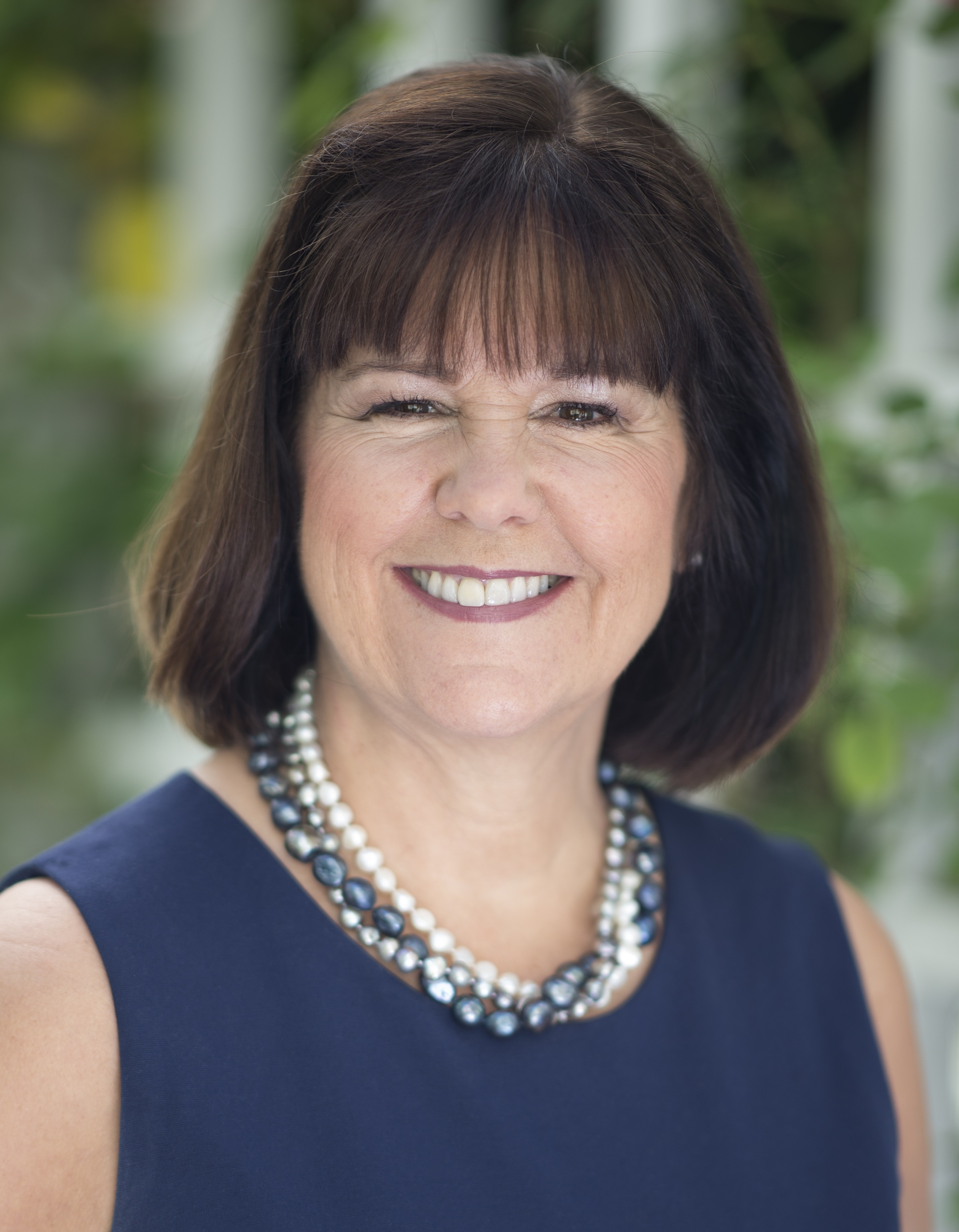
- Official portrait, 2017

Second Lady of the United States
- In role January 20, 2017 – January 20, 2021
- Vice President: Mike Pence
- Preceded by: Jill Biden
- Succeeded by: Doug Emhoff (Note: as second gentleman)

First Lady of Indiana
- In role January 14, 2013 – January 9, 2017
- Governor: Mike Pence
- Preceded by: Cheri Daniels
- Succeeded by: Janet Holcomb

Personal details
- Born: Karen Sue Batten; January 1, 1957 (age 69) McConnell Air Force Base, Kansas, U.S.
- Party: Republican
- Spouses: John Steven Whitaker (m. 1978, divorced); Mike Pence (m. 1985)
- Children: 3, including Charlotte
- Parents: John Batten; Lillian Hacker
- Relatives: Pence family (by marriage)
- Education: Butler University (BS, MS)
- Karen Pence's voice Pence speaking on Art Therapy; Recorded October 18, 2017

Karen Sue Pence (née Batten, formerly Whitaker; born January 1, 1957) is an American schoolteacher who was the second lady of the United States from 2017 to 2021. She is married to the 48th vice president of the United States, Mike Pence. Pence was also the first lady of Indiana from 2013 to 2017 during her husband's tenure as the 50th governor of that state.

Born at McConnell Air Force Base in Kansas, Pence grew up in Indianapolis. She graduated from Butler University nearby and pursued a career in teaching art. Pence married Mike Pence in 1985 and they had three children. When her husband was elected governor of Indiana, Pence became the First Lady of Indiana serving from 2013 until 2017. During her time as first lady, Pence worked with art therapy and she worked with young children and with military and their families. In the 2016 presidential election, her husband was selected as the Republican vice presidential nominee by presidential nominee Donald Trump. They won the election and Pence became Second Lady of the United States in 2021, succeeding Jill Biden.

During her tenure as Second Lady from 2017 until 2021, Pence continued her initiative with art therapy. Through her initiative "Healing with the HeART"" she helped with advocating to military spouses, and their employment challenges. Pence also promoted honey bee conservation at the vice presidential residence. Pence also served as an ambassador for the PREVENTS initiative on veteran suicide prevention. In the 2020 presidential election, Trump and Pence lost their re-election bids and her tenure as second lady ended on January 20, 2021. In the aftermath of her time as second lady, she released a book detailing her life as a political spouse, titled When It's Your Turn to Serve: Experiencing God's Grace in His Calling for Your Life. in 2023. She was also a part of her husband's 2024 presidential campaign for the Republican nomination in the 2024 United States presidential election.

== Early life and education ==
Pence was born as Karen Sue Batten at McConnell Air Force Base in Kansas on January 1, 1957, the daughter of Lillian (née Hacker; 1931–2004) and John M. Batten (1931–1988), a United Airlines official. Her parents divorced when she was very young, and her mother married Bernard Barcio in 1967 and her father remarried sometime in the 1960s to Margaret Holliday; she then had two stepbrothers from her fathers remarriage. She grew up in the Broad Ripple Village neighborhood of Indianapolis, where she graduated as valedictorian from Bishop Chatard High School. Pence attended nearby Butler University where she studied to become a teacher, and minored in art. She received both a Bachelor of Science (B.S.) and a Master of Science (M.S.) in elementary education from Butler University.

== Teaching career ==
Pence has taught over 25 years working as a teacher working at schools all across Indiana and in different parts in the United States.

Pence has taught at John Strange Elementary, Acton Elementary, Fall Creek Elementary, and the Orchard School, all in Indianapolis.

After the birth of her first child, Pence took a class in watercolor painting. This led to a career painting portraits of houses and historic buildings. She has completed as many as thirty-five paintings a year, some on commission and selling others at local art fairs.

While her husband was in Congress, Karen worked as an arts teacher for twelve years at Immanuel Christian School, a private Christian school in Springfield, Virginia,.

In 2015, Pence started a small business named "'That's My Towel!' Charm" which makes metal charms for attaching to towels so they can be more easily identified when among others. The business was put on hold when Mike Pence became a vice presidential candidate.

In January 2019, it was reported that Pence was returning as a part-time art teacher for Immanuel Christian School, and she said in a statement that she was "excited to be back in the classroom and doing what I love to do", and that she had "missed teaching art".

The school had previously been criticized and accused of homophobia for not admitting LGBT students, posting a policy wherein it is permitted to turn away students who engage in, uphold, or accept "sexual immorality, homosexual activity, or bisexual activity", with the policy also applying to parents and employees. Pence was criticized in the media and by LGBT advocates and advocacy organizations in the days following the announcement. Vice President Pence defended his wife's profession and decision, accusing her critics of attacking religious education. He said that he and his wife were "used to the criticism", but that he was angered over the criticism of his wife, opining that "to see major news organizations attacking Christian education is deeply offensive to us", and that it "should stop".

== First Lady of Indiana (2013–2017) ==
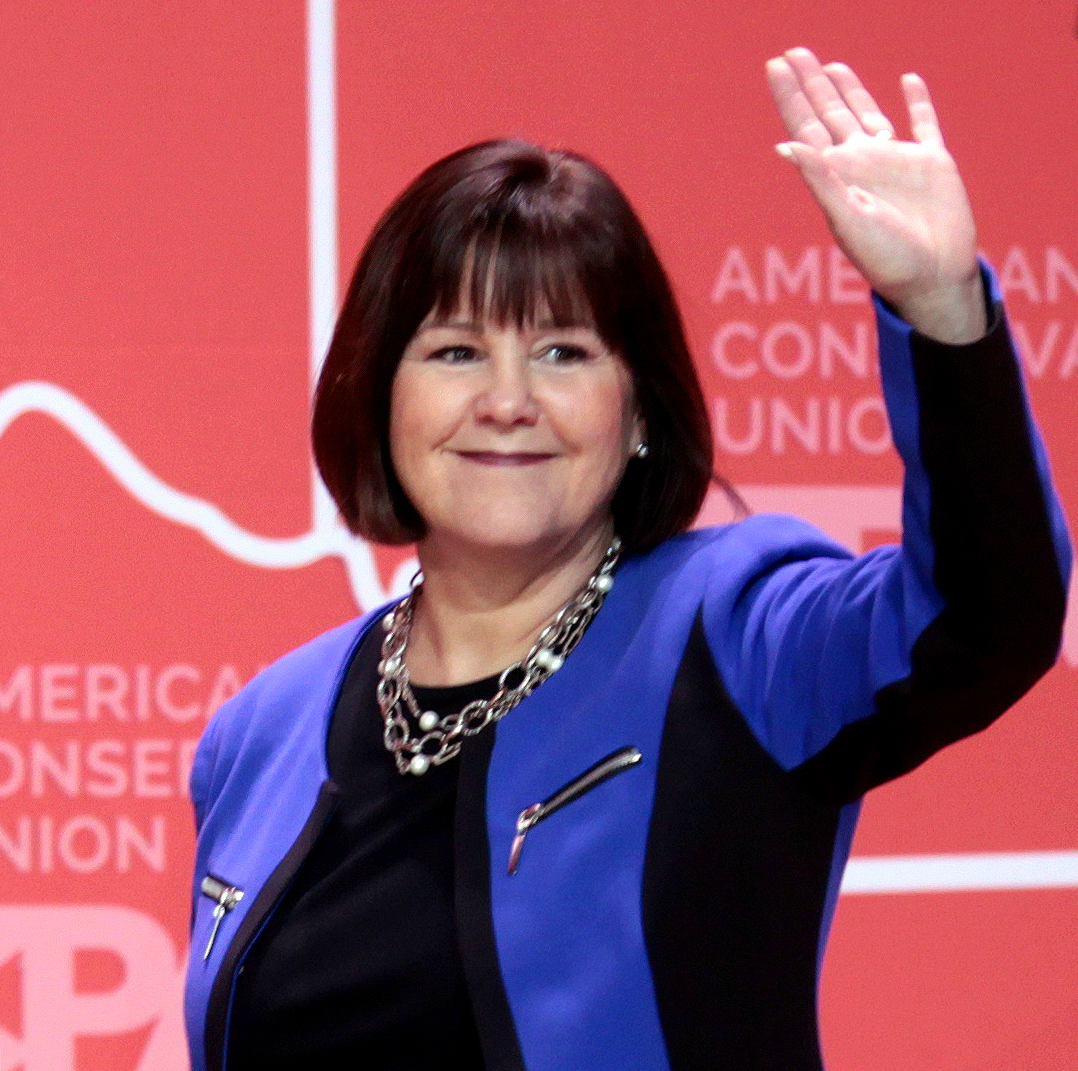
Karen Pence, the First Lady of Indiana, attending CPAC 2015 in Washington, D.C.

Pence became the First Lady of Indiana on January 14, 2013, when her husband Mike Pence was sworn in as the 50th Governor of Indiana after winning the 2012 Indiana gubernatorial election. She succeeded Cheri Daniels the wife of Governor Mitch Daniels. Pence was the First Lady of Indiana during her husband's term as governor of the state from 2013 to 2017. During her tenure, her and her family resided in the Indiana Governor's Mansion.

=== Tenure ===
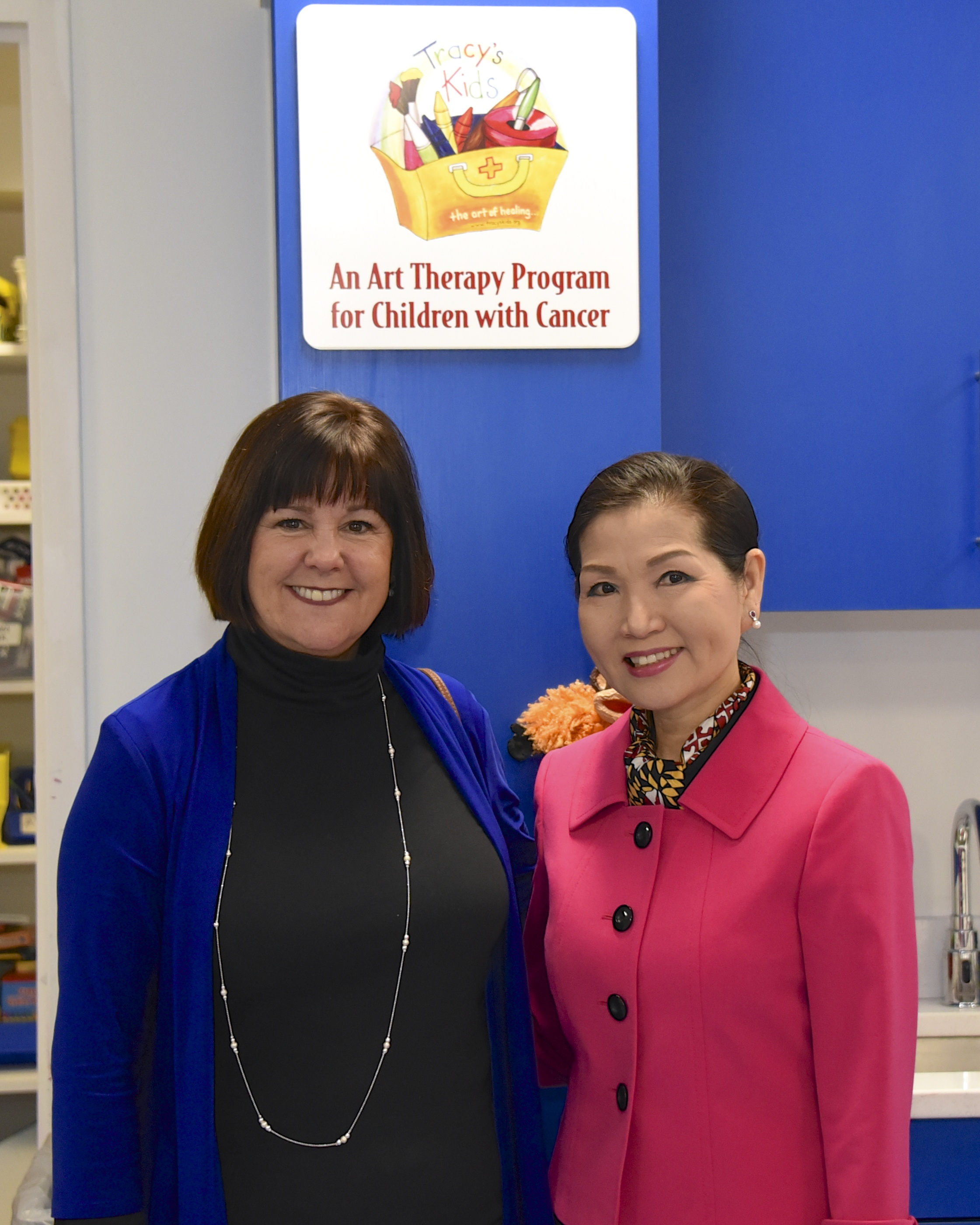
Pence with the First Lady of Maryland, Yumi Hogan

During her tenure, Pence established the Indiana First Lady's Charitable Foundation to "promote individuals and organizations that encourage children, families, and the arts", also offering grants and scholarships. A honey bee conservation advocate, Pence had a beehive installed at the Indiana Governor's Residence while first lady of the state. Pence partnered with the Hope line, a part of the Verizon program to collect cellphones. She secured corporate assistance for domestic violence survivors. Pence also promoted the Scholastic Summer Reading Program while first lady. This helped to prevent summer reading loss. She also helped to host educational youth activities. One of the activities was a Boy Scout Camp Out which was hosted outside the Indiana Governor's Residence. Pence also Wee-Ones Nursery prison program which allowed mothers in prison to stay with their infant children.

In the area of health care Pence had served as a member on the Board of Governors for the Riley Children's Foundation. With art therapy, she acted as the honorary chair of its Art Therapy Initiative. Pence held fundraisers to help hire full time art therapists at Riley. She worked with this to help gain positions that could be held permanently. Pence also made many international trips to places such as Germany, Japan, Canada, and Israel. She did this to observe and research foreign art therapy models to bring back methods to her home state of Indiana. Pence also advocated for statewide programs that addressed infant mortality rates. She supported Lupus Awareness and Pence participated in the Healthy Hoosier Foundation.

While first lady, Pence also researched state history and was heavily focused on the military during her tenure. Pence served in an ambassador position while first lady and in that position she traveled across the state of Indiana for the Indiana Bicentennial Commission. Pence frequently visited schools. When visiting the schools she taught children about the states history. Pence also wrote hand-signed deployment letters to members of the Indiana National Guard. Pence heavily supported the military and she connected with the Indiana Army National Guard Books and Boots project; she connected with parents whose children are in the military by reading.

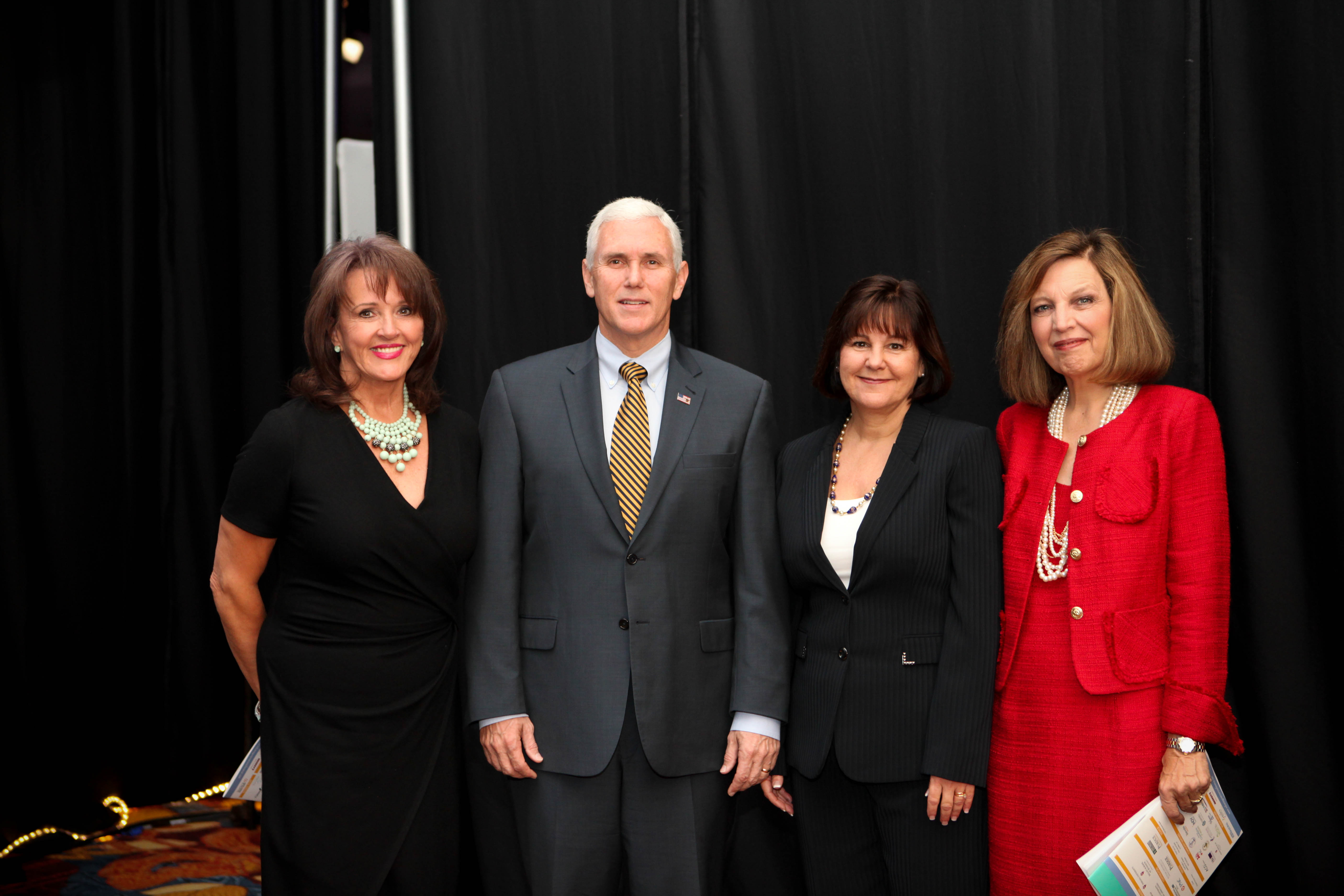
Pence with her husband, Governor Mike Pence, Billie Dragoo and Deborah Collins Stephens

Also when she was the first lady she made many property renovations. She oversaw a $162,000 major maintenance project. She renovated the interior of the 1930s historical Antes House in Brown County State Park. The five-bedroom cabin she had renovated serves as a retreat to the governor of Indiana and his family and the Pence family was the first family to regularly vacation there for a retreat in decades. Pence also managed the annual Tree Trim Program at the Indiana Statehouse and she hosted major historic property celebrations which included Statehood day, celebrating Christmas at the capitol, and events at the Indiana State Fair.

During her tenure, Pence also sponsored and judged statewide student essay contests to help to encourage young people to research and learn about influential women in Indiana's states history. Pence also supported and gave speeches for events at the Indiana chapter of JAG. This was a program which was dedicated to helping at-risk youth graduating from high school get into their early career. She also partnered with the Kids Dance Outreach organization to promote physical fitness, dance education, and a positive character development for young children in elementary schools across the state of Indiana. Pence also participated in and hosted youth development seminars. Pence focused on character-building, leadership, and public service for Indiana's next generation.

Pence's husband dropped out of the 2016 Indiana gubernatorial election when Donald Trump selected her husband as his vice presidential nominee in the 2016 United States presidential election. Pence's tenure ended on January 9, 2017, and she was succeeded by Janet Holcomb, the wife of Eric Holcomb.

=== Mike Pence 2016 vice presidential campaign ===
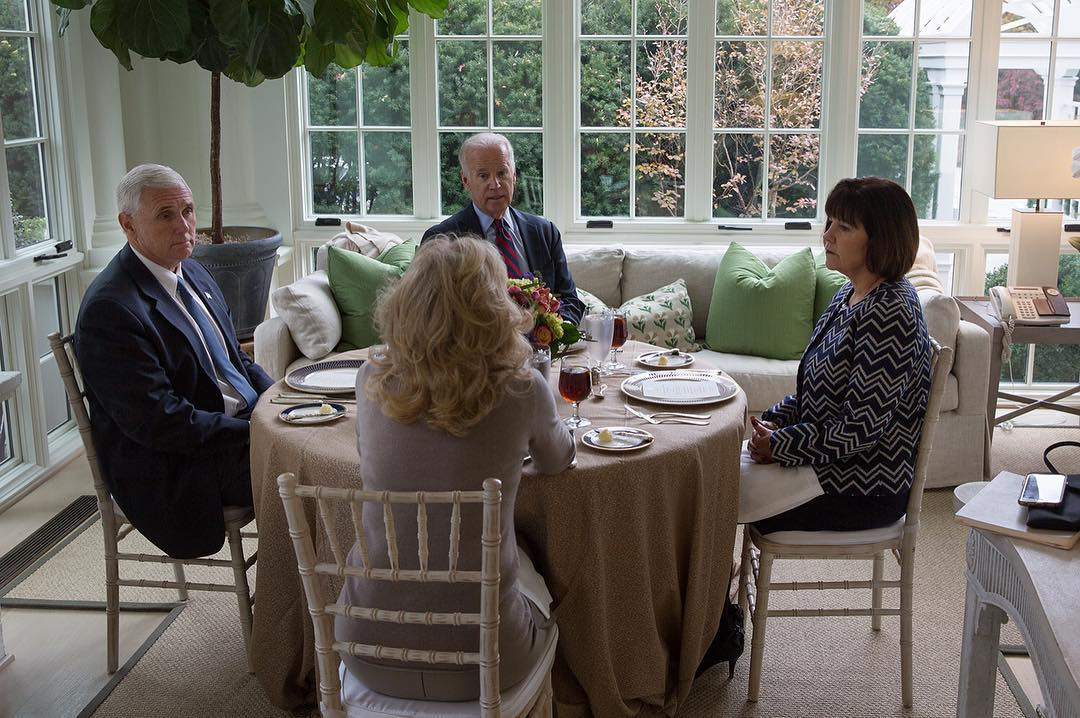
Pence with her husband, Vice President-elect and Outgoing Vice President, Joe Biden and outgoing Second lady, Jill Biden having lunch

During the 2016 United States presidential election when her husband was selected as the vice presidential nominee by the presidential nominee Donald Trump, Pence served as a behind the scenes trusted advisor to her husband. Being somewhat camera shy, Pence kept an extremely low profile during the election, though she was a large part in his campaign behind the scenes. She helped to lead the campaign staff in prayer and she also helped to manage the family's anxieties when spotlight was directed toward her and her family's personal finances. Some sources say that the allegations of misconduct by Donald Trump with the Access Hollywood tape, it had made her uncomfortable; the two later got along and rekindled their relationship.

Her public appearances were very limited but highly targeted. However, she did attend crucial milestone events alongside her husband such as the 2016 Republican National Convention though she did not give a speech. She was also present at the 2016 United States vice presidential debate in October against Senator Tim Kaine of Virginia in support for her husband. Pence consistently joined him on stage to clasp his hand at major multi-candidate rallies during the final weeks of the campaign. Her husband, Mike Pence and presidential nominee Donald Trump won the election carrying 304 electoral votes to Clinton's 227 electoral votes. During the transition period, Pence and her husband met with the outgoing vice president, Joe Biden, and the outgoing second lady, Jill Biden, having lunch with them at Number One Observatory Circle.

== Second Lady of the United States (2017–2021) ==
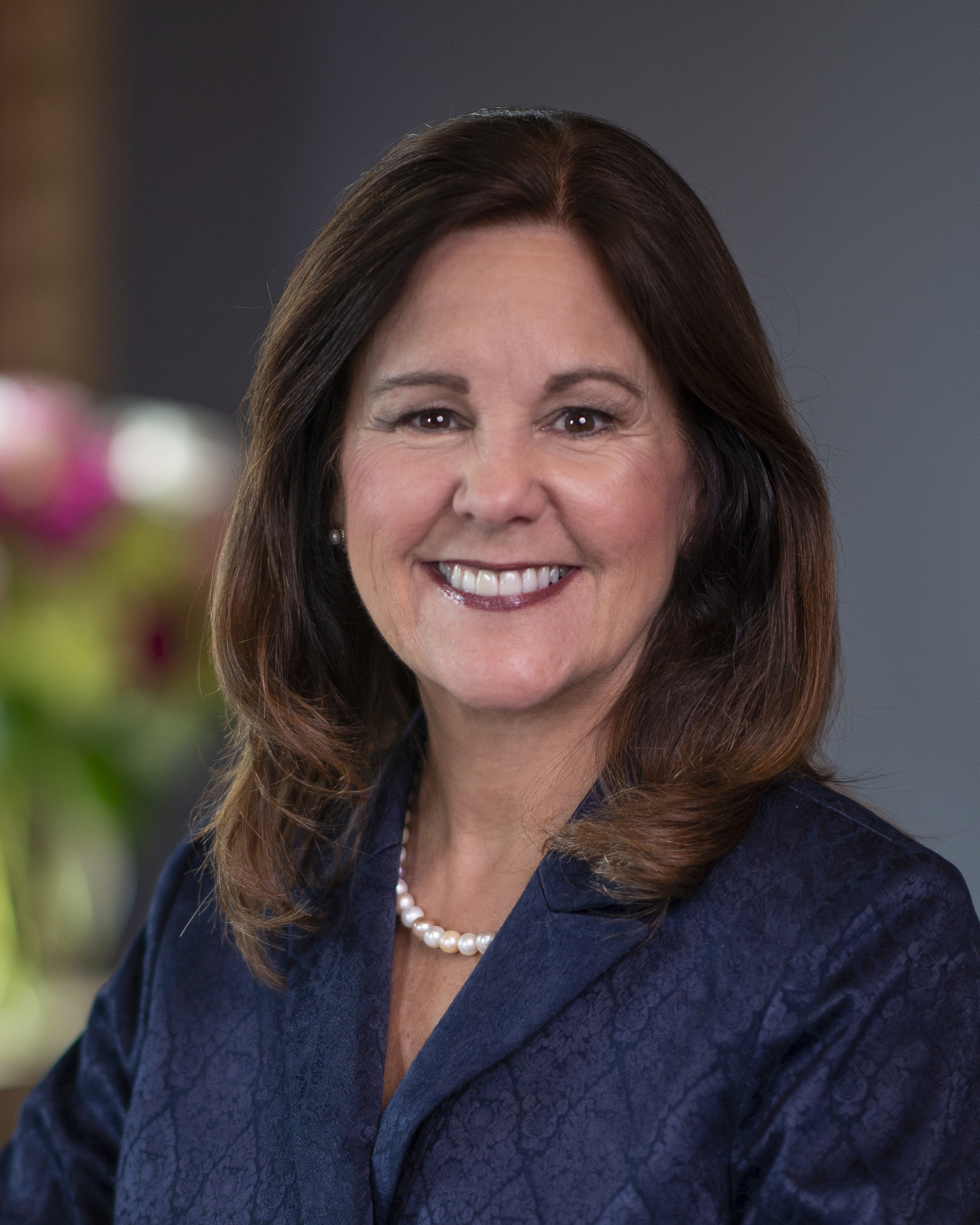
Pence's official portrait in 2019

Pence became the Second Lady of the United States on January 20, 2017, succeeding Jill Biden. She hired Kristan King Nevins as her chief of staff; Nevins had served in the same position under former First Lady Barbara Bush. As second lady, Pence worked to raise awareness of art therapy, to which she was first exposed when visiting a Washington hospital during her husband's tenure as a congressman. In October 2017, she visited the campus of Florida State University to highlight the university's art therapy program, which dates back to the 1990s.

Pence continued to raise awareness of honey bee habitat destruction and the importance of pollination in 2017 by having a beehive installed at the official vice presidential residence, Number One Observatory Circle.

In 2019, Pence traveled to Abu Dhabi as head of the U.S. delegation at the Special Olympics World Games. She also served as Vice-Chair of Sister Cities International.

As spouse of the vice presidential nominee, Pence delivered a speech as part of the 2020 Republican National Convention.

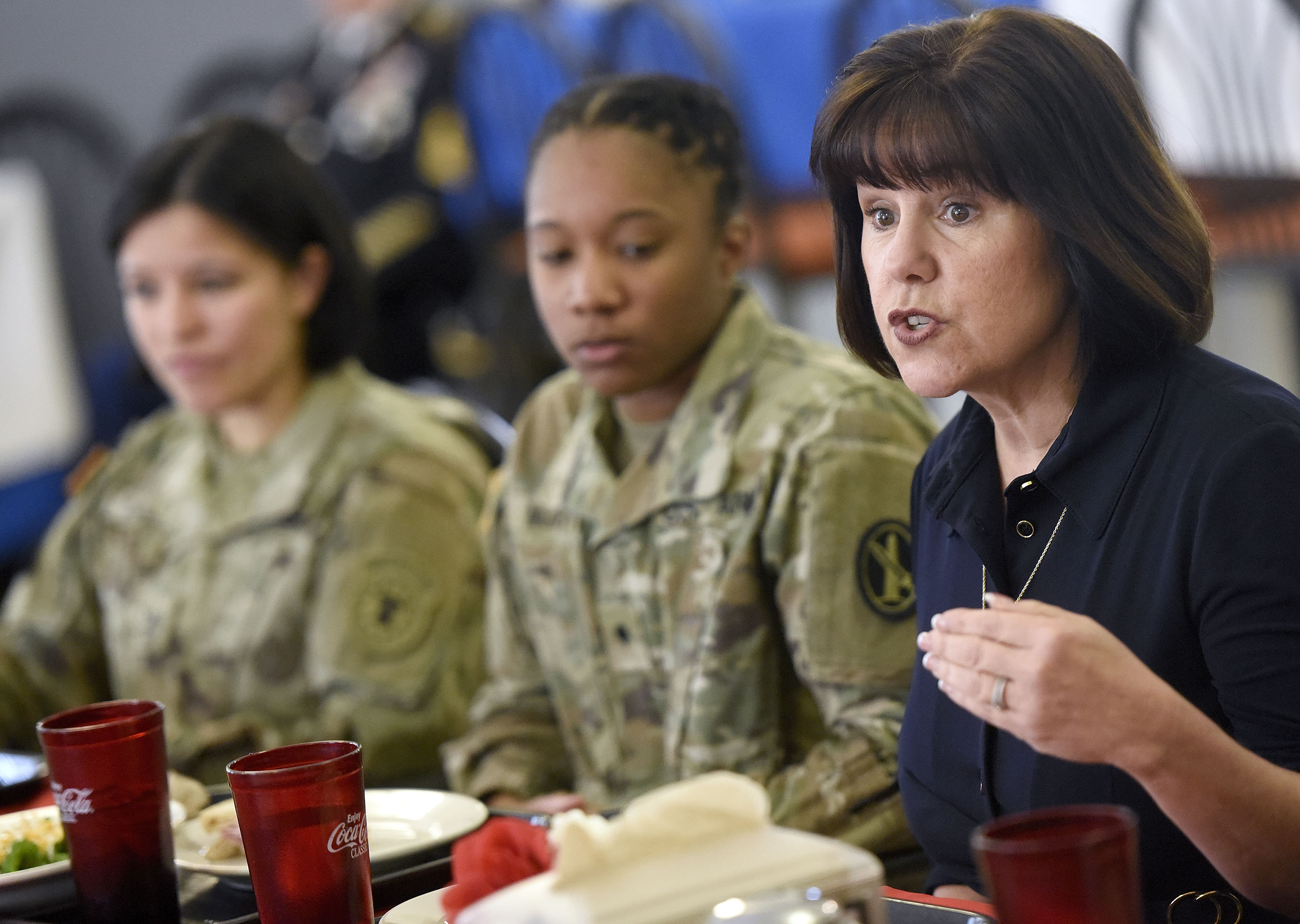
Pence with members of the Military

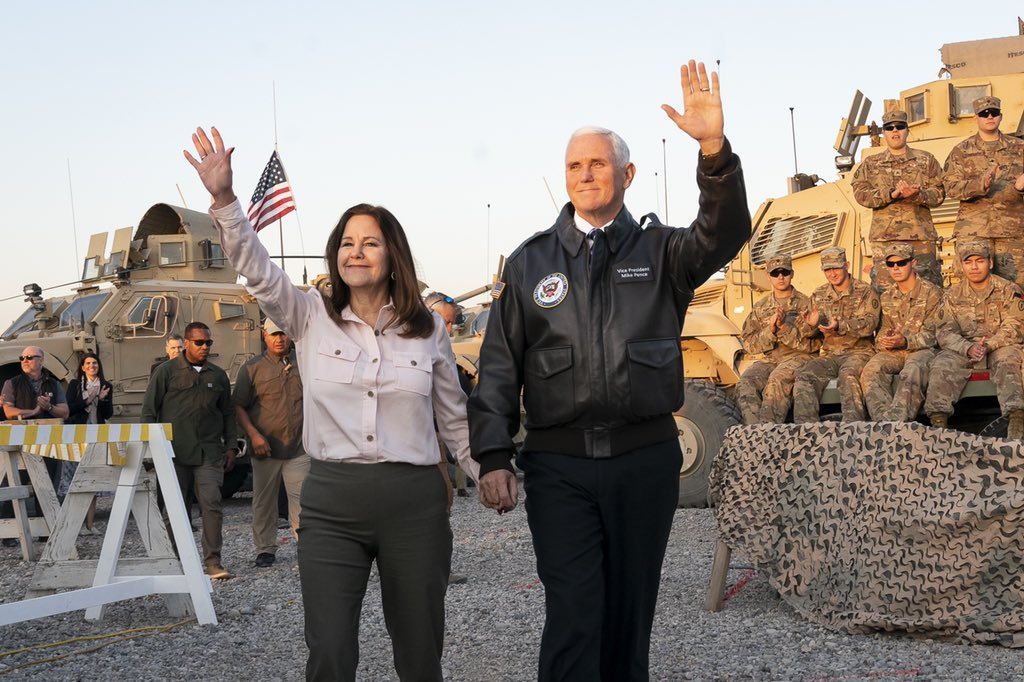
Pence with her husband at Erbil International Airport

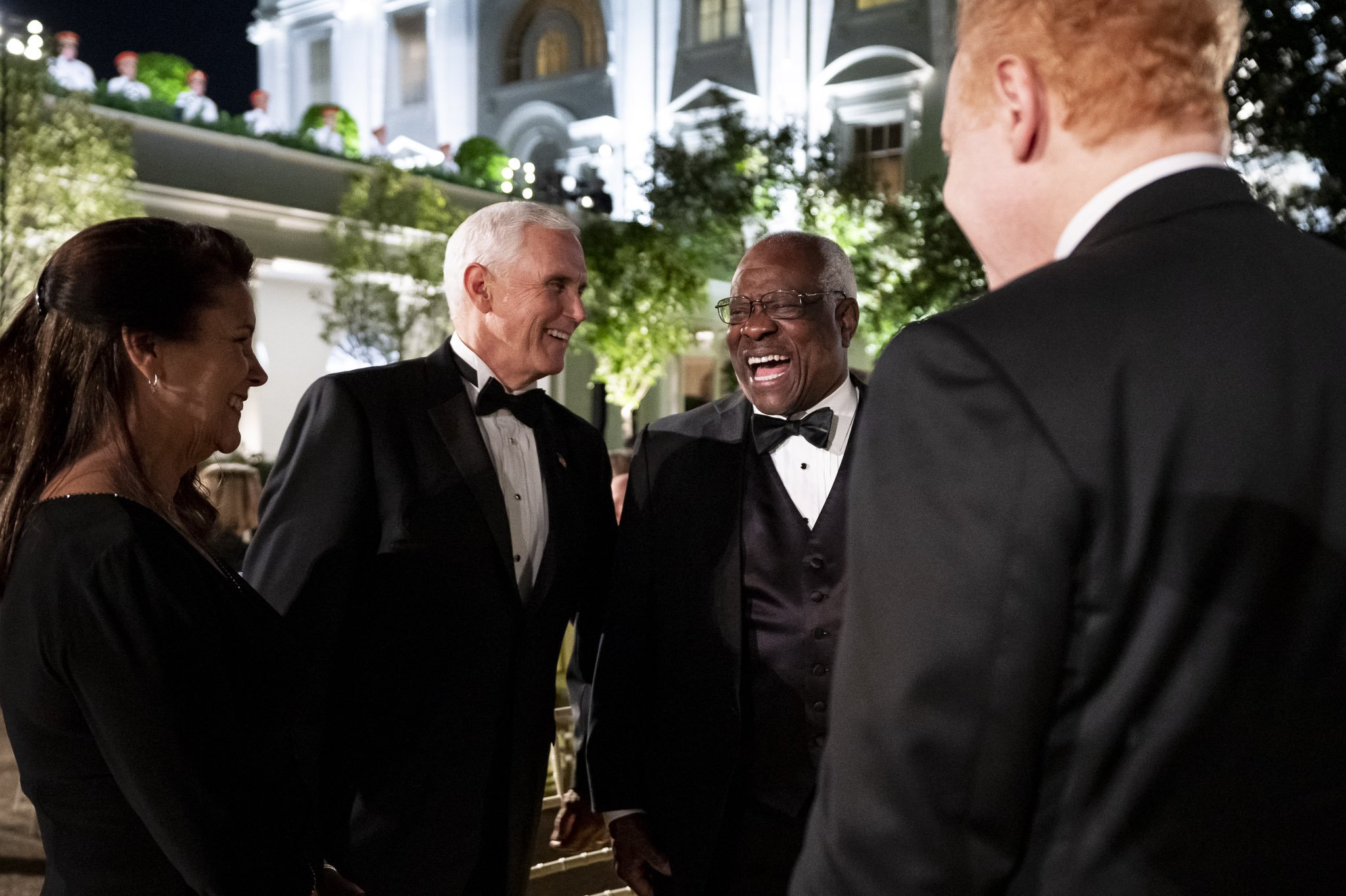
Pence and her husband with Scott Morrison at a White House event

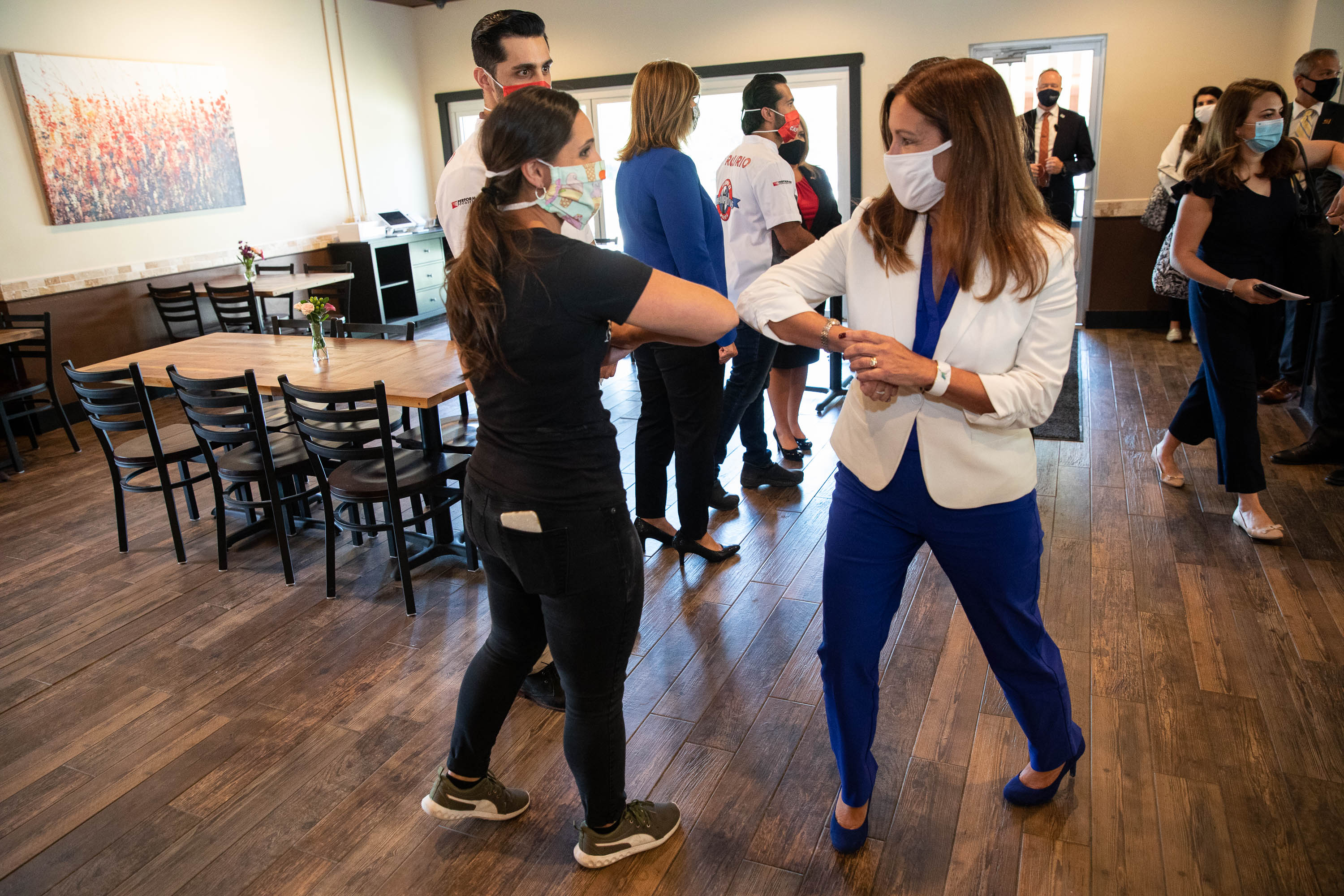
Pence at a pizza shop in Pennsylvania

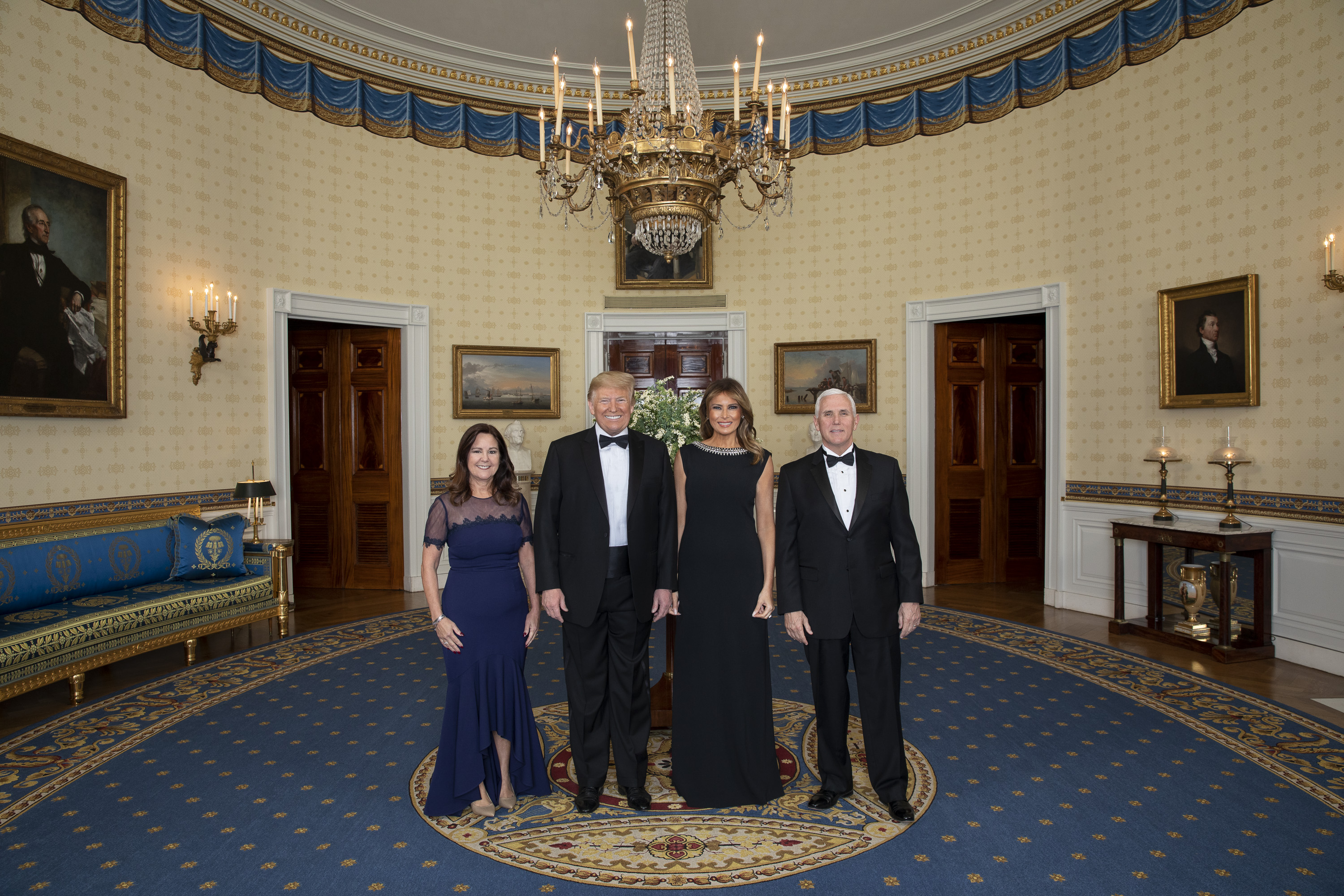
Pence and her husband with President Trump and First lady Melania Trump

== Personal life ==
While in high school, she met her first husband, John Steven Whitaker. They were married on August 4, 1978, in Brewster County, Texas, and later divorced. Whitaker was a medical student during their marriage.

Karen met Mike Pence while she was playing guitar at Mass at St. Thomas Aquinas Church, a Catholic church in Indianapolis they both attended. Their first date included ice skating at the Indiana State Fairgrounds. After about nine months of dating, they became engaged in August 1984 and married on June 8, 1985. They were both Roman Catholic and later converted to evangelical Christianity by 1995. The couple has three children: Michael (serving in the U.S. Marine Corps), Charlotte, and Audrey. Pence has lived most of her life in Indiana, though the entire family moved to Washington, D.C. for the twelve years that husband Mike was a congressman from Indiana before his election as governor of Indiana. She is a trained pilot.

Pence is known for her dedication to promoting art as a way of healing. She provided the watercolor illustrations for her daughter Charlotte's 2018 children's book, Marlon Bundo's A Day in the Life of the Vice President, the proceeds from which are given to charities, including an art therapy program.

In 2023, she released a book detailing her life as a political spouse, titled When It's Your Turn to Serve: Experiencing God's Grace in His Calling for Your Life.

== Works ==
- Pence, Karen (September 26, 2023). When It's Your Turn to Serve: Experiencing God's Grace in His Calling for Your Life. Broadside (HarperCollins). ISBN 978-0063303980. OCLC 1373082069.

== Notes ==
Honorary titles
Preceded by Cheri Daniels	First Lady of Indiana; 2013–2017	Succeeded by Janet Holcomb
Preceded by Jill Biden	Second Lady of the United States; 2017–2021	Succeeded by Douglas Emhoff as Second Gentleman
