= Cheri Herman Daniels =

First Lady of Indiana (2005–2013)

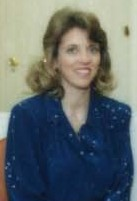
- Daniels in 1987

Indiana State Fair Commissioner
- In office May 23, 2022 – September 30, 2025
- Governor: Eric Holcomb

First Lady of Indiana
- In office January 10, 2005 – January 14, 2013
- Governor: Mitch Daniels
- Preceded by: Maggie Kernan
- Succeeded by: Karen Pence

Personal details
- Born: Cheri Lynn Herman; 1950 (age 75–76) New Albany, Indiana, U.S.
- Party: Republican
- Spouses: Mitch Daniels (m. 1978; div. 1993); (m. 1997)
- Children: 4
- Relatives: Billy Herman (grandfather)
- Education: Indiana University Bloomington

Cheri Lynn Herman Daniels (born 1950) is an American civic leader who served as First Lady of Indiana from 2005 to 2013 as the wife of Governor Mitch Daniels. In 2022, she was appointed by Governor Eric Holcomb to serve on the commission for the Indiana State Fair.

== Early life and education ==
Daniels was born Cheri Lynn Herman in New Albany, Indiana, in 1950. She is a granddaughter of professional baseball player Billy Herman.

She studied journalism at Indiana University Bloomington and was a member of Zeta Tau Alpha.

== Public life ==
Daniels served as First Lady of Indiana from January 10, 2005, to January 14, 2013, during her husband's term as Governor of Indiana. As first lady, she partnered with the Indiana State Department of Health to raise awareness for heart disease in women. She participated in a program called "Cheri's Chores", where she learned job skills including driving a dump truck and working as a lunch lady. In 2011, she gave the keynote address during Indiana's Republican Party fundraiser, referring to herself as "the pig whisperer" and an "honorary Hooters Girl".

Daniels served as a member of Indiana Heart Hospital's advisory board and as a member of the foundation board for Community Hospitals.

In 2022, she was appointed by Governor Eric Holcomb to serve on the Indiana State Fair Commission. She served on the commission from May 23, 2022, to September 30, 2025. She also served on the Indiana State Fair's board.

== Personal life ==
She married Mitch Daniels in 1978 and had four daughters. They divorced in 1993 and she remarried. She later divorced her second husband and remarried Daniels in 1997.

Daniels won multiple awards at the Indiana State Fair for milking cows and spitting watermelon seeds.

Honorary titles
Preceded by Maggie Kernan	First Lady of Indiana; 2005–2013	Succeeded by Karen Pence
