= First Lady of Indiana =

Spouse of the governor of Indiana

- Seal of Indiana

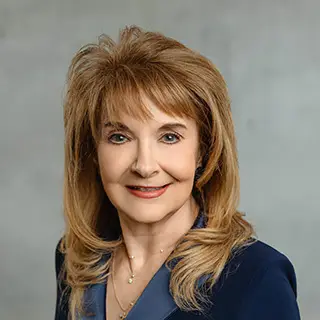
- Current; Maureen Braun since January 13, 2025
- Style: Mrs. Braun, Madam First Lady
- Residence: Governor's Residence
- Inaugural holder: Anna Harrison (Territory of Indiana) Ann Gilmore Hay (State of Indiana)
- Formation: November 7, 1816 (209 years ago)

The first lady of Indiana is the spouse of the governor of Indiana. The role of First Lady of Indiana has never been defined. The spouse of Indiana is prominent in the social life of the state. As of 2026, there have been no female governors of the state of Indiana and therefore no first gentleman of the state of Indiana. Not all governor's of the state have been married and some have had several first ladies during their tenure

There are 5 former living first ladies of the state: Judy O'Bannon widow of Governor Frank O'Bannon, Maggie Kernan wife of Governor Joe Kernan, Cheri Herman Daniels, wife of Governor Mitch Daniels, Karen Pence, wife of Governor Mike Pence, and Janet Holcomb, wife of Governor Eric Holcomb.

== History ==
The title of First Lady of Indiana was first established on November 7 in the year 1816 with Mariah Jennings becoming the first first lady (wife of Jonathan Jennings). Before Indiana was a state, when it was a territory future First Lady of the United States, Anna Harrison served as First lady of the territory of Indiana when her husband, future President of the United States, William Henry Harrison served as governor of the territory of Indiana.

Three first ladies of Indiana have served as second ladies of the United States while their husbands were vice president of the United States. This includes Eliza Hendricks (wife of Thomas A. Hendricks), Lois Irene Marshall (wife of Thomas R. Marshall) and Karen Pence (wife of Mike Pence).

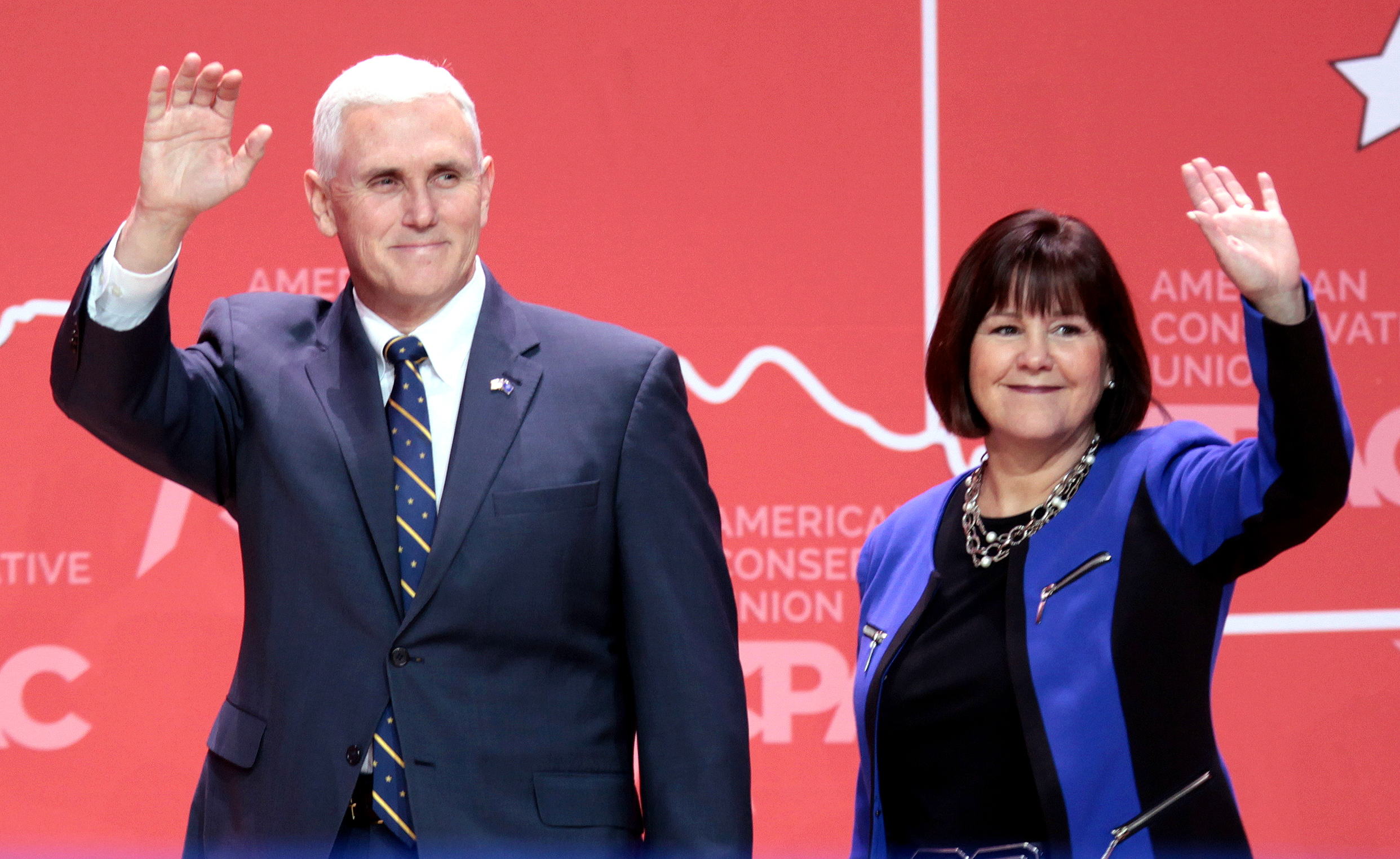
First Lady Karen Pence with husband, Governor Mike Pence.

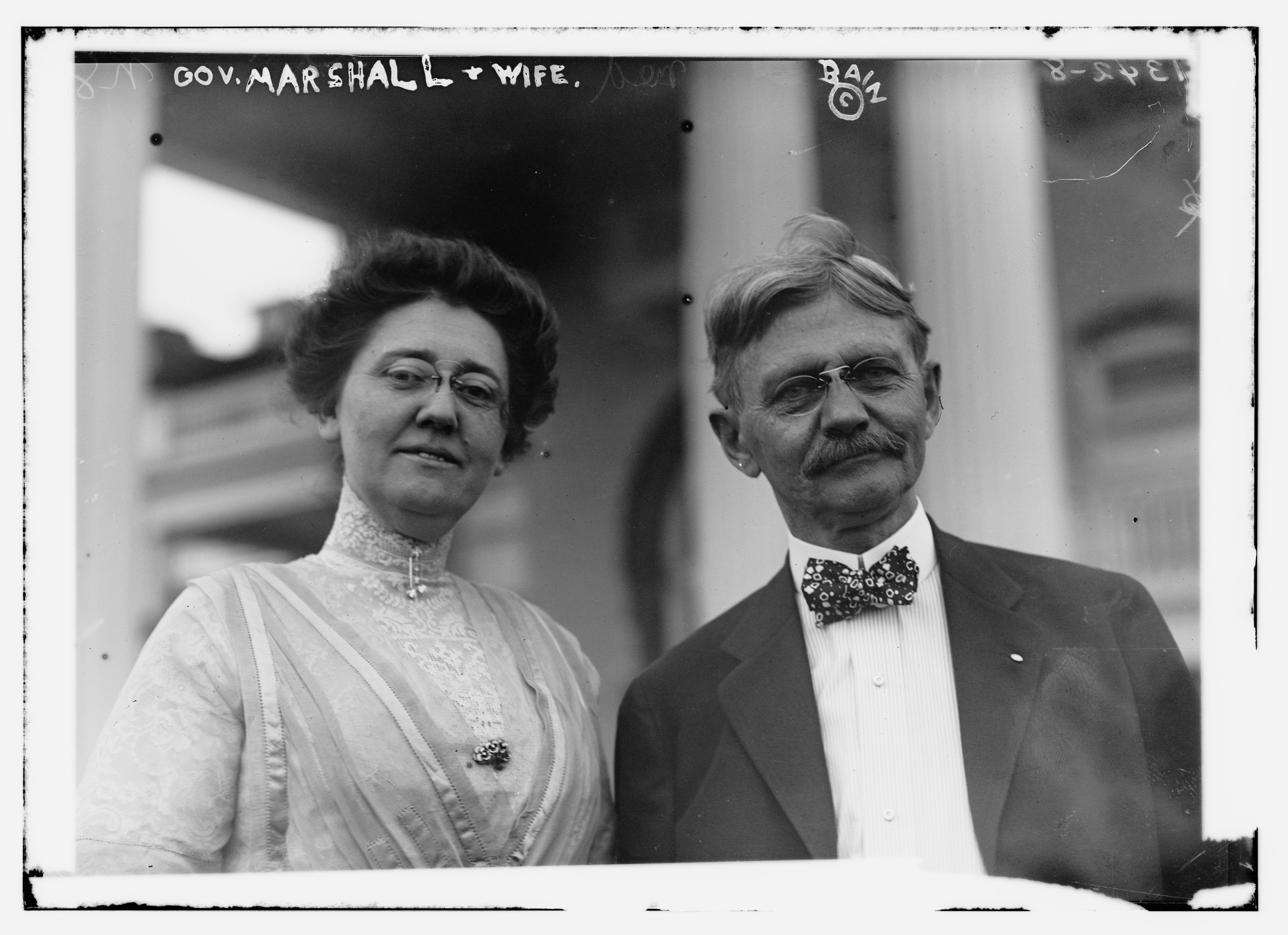
First Lady Lois Irene Marshall with husband, Governor Thomas R. Marshall.

== Current ==
The current first lady of Indiana is Maureen Braun who is the wife of Republican governor Mike Braun who has been serving since January 13 of 2025. As first lady of Indiana, Maureen Braun has focused on improving childhood literacy by leading fundraisers throughout the state.

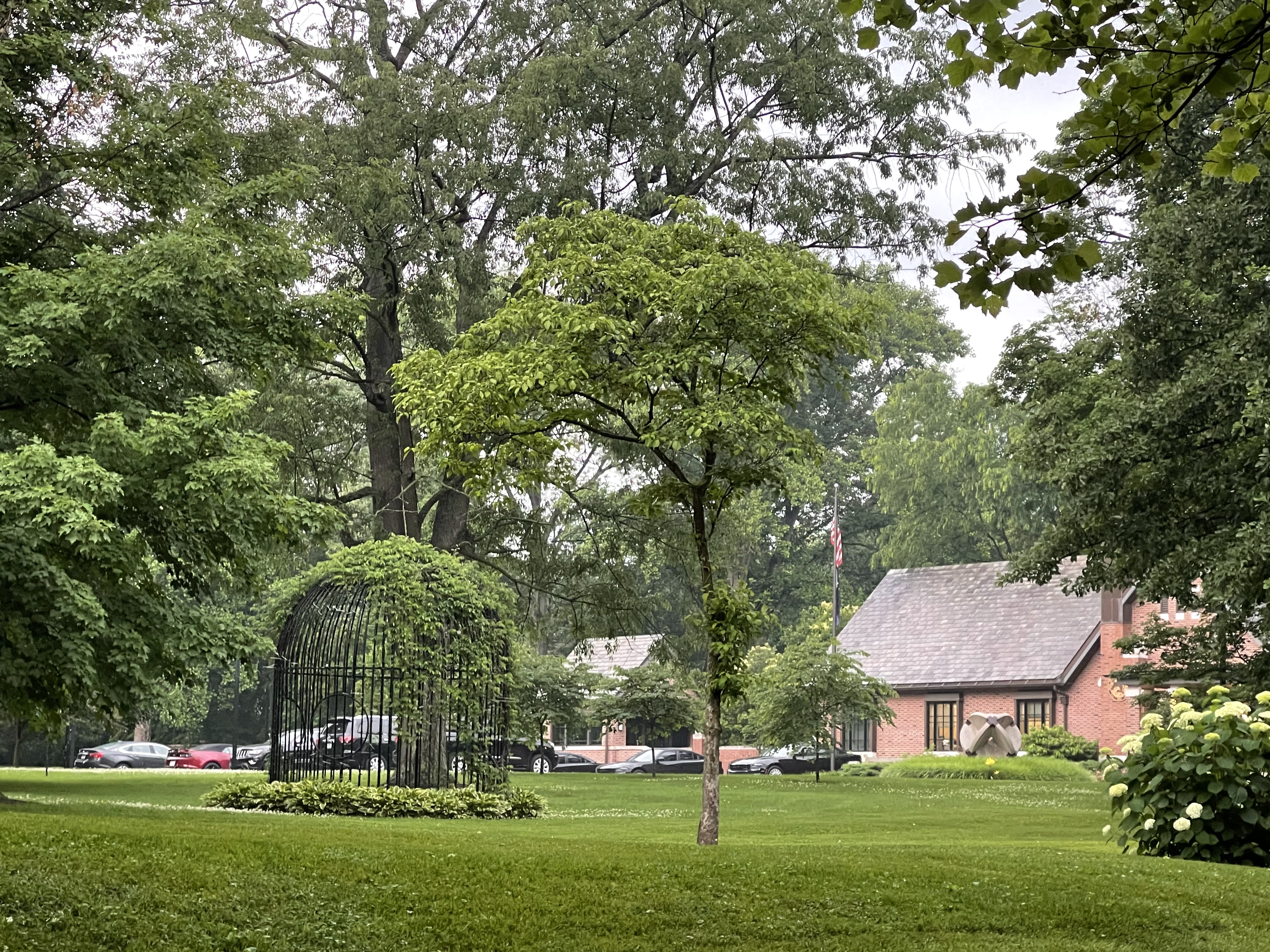
Residence of the current First Lady of Indiana, Maureen Braun and Governor Mike Braun and the First Family of the state.

== List of First Ladies of the Territory of Indiana ==
| Name | Image | Birth-Death | Term | Territorial Governor | Notes |
|---|---|---|---|---|---|
| Anna Harrison | | (1775–1864) | January 10, 1801 – December 28, 1812 | William Henry Harrison | Later became First Lady of the United States upon her husbands Inauguration in 1841. |
| Mary Alexander Thornton | | (1756–1837) | March 3, 1813 – November 7, 1816 | Thomas Posey | Was the second wife of Thomas Posey and the last first lady of the territory of Indiana before it reached statehood. |

There were only two first ladies of the Indiana territory, before the state reached statehood in 1816.

== List of First Ladies of the State of Indiana ==
| Name | Image | Birth-Death | Term | Governor | Notes | References |
|---|---|---|---|---|---|---|
| Ann Gilmore Hay | | (1792–1826) | November 7, 1816 – September 12, 1822 | Jonathan Jennings | She was the first First Lady of the State of Indiana. she was the first of two wives her husband had throughout his lifetime. | |
| Delilah Anderson Boon | | (1777–1848) | September 12, 1822 – December 5, 1822 | Ratliff Boon | She had the second shortest tenure as First Lady of Indiana serving a little less than three months. | |
| Ann Parker Paul | | (1700s–1800s) Unknown | December 5, 1822 – February 12, 1825 | William Hendricks | During her and her husbands marriage they had no children. | |
| Esther Booker | | (Late 1700s – 1800s) Unknown | February 12, 1825 – December 7, 1831 | James B. Ray | She married her husband during his tenure as governor. Throughout their marriage they had several children together. | |
| Catherine Stull Van Swearingen Noble | | (1700s–1800s) Unknown | December 7, 1831 – December 6, 1837 | Noah Noble | During her and her husbands marriage they had no children. | |
| Zerelda G. Wallace | | (1817–1901) | December 6, 1837 – December 9, 1840 | David Wallace | During her marriage with her husband she had several children with him. She was the stepmother of her husband child, Lew Wallace from his first marriage as along with several others. | |
| Ellen Williamson | | (1819–1877) | December 9, 1840 – December 6, 1843 | Samuel Bigger | During her and her husbands marriage they had no children. | |
| Martha Ann Hurst | | (Late 1700s or Early 1800s – 1847) Unknown | December 6, 1843 – December 27, 1848 | James Whitcomb | During her and her husbands marriage they had one child, a daughter named Martha Renick Whitcomb. | |
| Vacant | Vacant | Vacant | Vacant | James Whitcomb | His wife died as a result of childbirth, which left him a widower during his tenure. | |
| Sarah Alexander | | (1810 approx. – 1863) | December 26, 1848 – December 5, 1849 | Paris C. Dunning | Was the first wife of her husband, he later remarried to his second wife Allen Ashford. | |
| Louisa Cook | | (1812, approx. – 1852) | December 5, 1849 – 1852 | Joseph A. Wright | Was the first wife of her husband and died during her tenure as First Lady of Indiana. | |
| Vacant | Vacant | Vacant | Vacant | Joseph A. Wright | This period was in-between his first and second marriages when he was a widower. | |
| Harriet Burbridge | | (1800s–1855) | 1854–1855 | Joseph A. Wright | Was the second wife of her husband and died during her tenure as First Lady of Indiana. | |
| Vacant | Vacant | Vacant | 1855 – January 12, 1867. | Joseph A. Wright | His second wife died when he was governor and for the rest of his tenure the office was vacant. After his tenure he did remarry to his third and final wife, Caroline Rockwell. | |
| Unmarried | Unmarried | Unmarried | Unmarried | Ashbel P. Willard | Was Unmarried throughout his life. | |
| Unmarried | Unmarried | Unmarried | Unmarried | Abram A. Hammond | Was Unmarried throughout his life. | |
| Joanna Maria Elston | | (1817–1914) | January 14, 1861 – January 16, 1861 | Henry S. Lane | Shortest serving First Lady of Indiana with a tenure of two days. | |
| Lucinda Burbank Morton | | (1826–1907) | January 16, 1861 – January 24, 1867 | Oliver P. Morton | She served as second Lady of Indiana when her husband was Lieutenant Governor. | |
| Matilda Baker | | (1800s–1855) | January 24, 1867 – January 13, 1873 | Conrad Baker | She served as second Lady of Indiana when her husband was Lieutenant Governor. | |
| Eliza Hendricks | | (1823–1903) | January 13, 1873 – January 8, 1877. | Thomas A. Hendricks | Later became Second Lady of the United States in 1885, serving until her husbands death. | |
| Nancy Williams | | (1805–1880) | January 8, 1877 – June 27, 1880 | James D. Williams | Her and her husband had seven children together while they were married. | |
| Vacant | Vacant | Vacant | June 27, 1880 – November 20, 1880 | James D. Williams | His wife died during his last few months as governor, thus making him a widower. | |
| Eliza Jane Jaqua Gray 1st term | | (1828–1908) | November 20, 1880 – January 10, 1881 | Isaac P. Gray 1st term | She served as second Lady of Indiana when her husband was Lieutenant Governor. | |
| Cornelia Stone | | (1800s–1886) | January 10, 1881 – January 12, 1885 | Albert G. Porter | She was the second wife of her husband and they married during his first year as Governor. | |
| Eliza Jane Jaqua Gray 2nd term | | (1828–1908) | January 12, 1885 – January 14, 1889 | Isaac P. Gray 2nd term | First First lady to hold non-consecutive terms. One of two First Ladies of Indiana to serve non-consecutive terms. | |
| Unmarried | Unmarried | Unmarried | Unmarried | Alvin Peterson Hovey | Was Unmarried throughout his life. | |
| Rhoda Jane Castle | | (1833–1926) | November 23, 1891 – January 9, 1893 | Ira Joy Chase | Her and her husband had no children. She served as second Lady of Indiana when her husband was Lieutenant Governor. | |
| Martha Renick Whitcomb | | (1847–1923) | January 9, 1893 – January 11, 1897 | Claude Matthews | During her marriage her and her husband had two children together. | |
| Catherine Boyd | | (1849–1928) | January 11, 1897 – January 14, 1901 | James A. Mount | Her husband was in the Military from 1862 to 1865 during the American Civil war and was ranked as a Sergeant. | |
| Bertha McCullough | | (1853–1945) | January 14, 1901 – January 9, 1905 | Winfield T. Durbin | During her and her husbands marriage they had no children. | |
| Eva Hanly | | (1860–1927) | January 9, 1905 – January 11, 1909 | Frank Hanly | During her and her husbands marriage they had no children. | |
| Lois Irene Marshall | | (1873–1958) | January 11, 1909 – January 13, 1913. | Thomas R. Marshall | Later became Second Lady of the United States in 1913, serving for 8 years. | |
| Jennie Ralston | | (1861–1925) | January 13, 1913 – January 8, 1917 | Samuel M. Ralston | She was the second wife of her husband, and they were married from 1889 until her husbands death in 1925 on October 14. | |
| Cora Frist | | (1861–1941) | January 8, 1917 – January 10, 1921 | James P. Goodrich | During her marriage her and her husband had one child, Pierre F. Goodrich, who was a lawyer, philanthropist, businessman and founder of Liberty Fund. | |
| Ella M. Ade | | (1869–1939) | January 10, 1921 – April 30, 1924 | Warren T. McCray | Her term as First lady of Indiana came to an end after her husband resigned from Governor as a result of his conviction. He was pardoned by President Herbert Hoover. | |
| Katherine Bain | | (1800s–1900s) Unknown | April 30, 1924 – January 12, 1925 | Emmett Forest Branch | She served as Second Lady of Indiana while her husband was Lieutenant Governor of Indiana. | |
| Lydia Beatty Pierce | | (1800s–1900s) Unknown | January 12, 1925 – January 14, 1929 | Edward L. Jackson | She was the second wife of her husband, marrying in 1920. His first wife was Rosa Wilkinson. | |
| Martha Morgan Pierce | | (1886–1977) | January 14, 1929 – January 9, 1933 | Harry G. Leslie | During her and her husbands marriage they had no children. | |
| Kathleen Timolat | | (1894–1980) | January 9, 1933 – January 11, 1937 | Paul V. McNutt | She and her husband married in 1918 and had no children together. She was widowed when her husband died in 1955. | |
| Nora Adele Harris | | (1889–1982) | January 11, 1937 – January 13, 1941 | M. Clifford Townsend | Her and her husband had no children. She served as second Lady of Indiana when her husband was Lieutenant Governor. | |
| Maude L. Brown 1st term | | (1888–1973) | January 13, 1941 – January 8, 1945 | Henry F. Schricker 1st term | Married her husband in 1914 and had no children together during their 52 year long marriage. | |
| Helene Edwards | | (1893–1968) | January 8, 1945 – January 10, 1949 | Ralph F. Gates | During her marriage her and her husband had two children together. | |
| Maude L. Brown 2nd term | | (1888–1973) | January 10, 1949 – January 12, 1953 | Henry F. Schricker 2nd term | One of two First Ladies of Indiana to serve non-consecutive terms. | |
| Kathryn L. Heiliger | | (1911–2001) | January 12, 1953 – January 14, 1957 | George N. Craig | During her marriage her and her husband had two children together. | |
| Barbara Winterble Handley | | (1909–2000) | January 14, 1957 – January 9, 1961 | Harold W. Handley | During her marriage her and her husband had two children together. | |
| Virginia Homann Welsh | | (1912–2001) | January 9, 1961 – January 11, 1965 | Matthew E. Welsh | During her marriage her and her husband had two children together. | |
| Josephine Mardis Branigin | | (1908–1988) | January 11, 1965 – January 13, 1969. | Roger D. Branigin | She married her husband in 1929 and survived him after he died in 1975. | |
| Patricia Dolfus Whitcomb | | (1930 or 1931 – 2021) | January 13, 1969 – January 8, 1973 | Edgar Whitcomb | After her tenure as first lady, her and the governor divorced in 1986. | |
| Elizabeth Bowen | | (1918–1981) | January 8, 1973 – January 12, 1981. | Otis Bowen | She died just a few months after serving as First Lady of Indiana. Her husband remarried twice. | |
| Josie Davis | | (1900s–2004) | January 12, 1981 – January 9, 1989. | Robert D. Orr | After her tenure as First Lady of Indiana, her and her husband divorced in 2000. | |
| Susan Bayh | | (1959–2021) | January 9, 1989 – January 13, 1997. | Evan Bayh | During her marriage to her husband they had two twin boys. The names are Birch Evans IV and (Beau) and Nicholas born in 1995. | |
| Judy O'Bannon | | (b. 1935) | January 13, 1997 – September 13, 2003. | Frank O'Bannon | During her tenure some topics she worked on were Communities Building Community, The "States Living Room", Building a Global Community and Work with other First ladies. | |
| Maggie Kernan | | (b. 1946) | September 13, 2003 – January 10, 2005. | Joe Kernan | During her tenure, Kernan launched a statewide effort to recruit mentors for seventh grade students in schools. | |
| Cheri Herman Daniels | | (b. 1950) | January 10, 2005 – January 14, 2013. | Mitch Daniels | During her tenure, she partnered with the Indiana State Department of Health to raise awareness for heart disease in woman. | |
| Karen Pence | | (b. 1957) | January 14, 2005 – January 9, 2017. | Mike Pence | Pence, a honeybee conservative had a beehive installed at the governor's mansion. Later became Second Lady of the United States in 2017. | |
| Janet Holcomb | | (b. 1950s) Unknown | January 17, 2017 – January 13, 2025. | Eric Holcomb | During her tenure, Holcomb focused on Youth and Education, the Arts and Outdoor Sports. | |
| Maureen Braun | | (b. 1950s) Unknown | January 13, 2025 -. | Mike Braun | Incumbent First Lady since 2025. Wife of Current Governor, Republican Mike Braun. | |

There has been a total of 50 first ladies of Indiana, with some governors being unmarried and some having multiple marriages during their governorship.

== See also ==
- First Lady of the United States
- Second Lady of the United States
- First lady
- List of current United States first spouses

== Sources and references ==
1. https://www.nga.org/governor-spouse/janet-holcomb/
2. https://www.in.gov/governorhistory/mikepence/karenpence/index.htm
3. https://www.nga.org/former-governors/indiana/
4. https://www.nga.org/governor-spouse/maureen-braun/
5. https://www.nga.org/governor-spouse/maureen-braun/
