= Susan Bayh =

First Lady of Indiana from 1989 to 1997

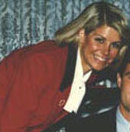

First Lady of Indiana
- In role January 9, 1989 – January 13, 1997
- Governor: Evan Bayh
- Preceded by: Josie Wallace
- Succeeded by: Judy O'Bannon

Personal details
- Born: Susan Lynne Breshears; November 28, 1959 Los Angeles, California, U.S.
- Died: February 5, 2021 (aged 61) McLean, Virginia, U.S.
- Spouse: Evan Bayh (m. 1985)
- Children: 2, including Beau
- Education: University of California, Berkeley (BA); University of Southern California (JD)

Susan Lynne Bayh (/baɪ/ BY; November 28, 1959 – February 5, 2021) was an American attorney and First Lady of Indiana from 1989 until 1997. She was married to Evan Bayh, a Democratic Indiana politician, who served as the state's governor (1989–1997) and United States Senator (1999–2011).

A newspaper in Indiana described her as being engaged in a profession it termed "professional board member" or "professional director".

== Career ==
Bayh began her careers in law and business as a litigator for the Los Angeles law firms of Gibson, Dunn & Crutcher, and later for the Indiana firm of Barnes & Thornburg. In 1989, she joined the pharmaceutical division at the Indianapolis-based Eli Lilly and Company, managing the company's handling of federal regulatory issues. In 1994, she left the employ of Eli Lilly and taught at Butler University's College of Business Administration, holding the title of distinguished visiting professor.

An Indiana newspaper listed eight corporations of which Bayh was a director, as of 2006. Bayh began serving on corporate boards in 1994 and thereafter served on the boards of 14 corporations, including the insurance, pharmaceutical, and food processing industries.

== Personal life ==
Bayh earned her Bachelor of Arts degree from the University of California, Berkeley. She was a past Miss Southern California and a member of Alpha Phi. She earned her Juris Doctor degree from the University of Southern California Law School in 1984. In her first year of law school, she won the American Jurisprudence Award for having the highest grade in her class in the Tort law class.

Bayh and her husband had twin sons, Birch Evans IV (Beau) and Nicholas, born in 1995.

In May 2018, Bayh underwent brain surgery to remove a malignant glioblastoma tumor. She died in McLean, Virginia, on February 5, 2021, at the age of 61.

Honorary titles
Preceded by Joanne Wallace	First Lady of Indiana; 1989–1997	Succeeded by Judy O'Bannon
