= Judy O'Bannon =

First Lady of the State of Indiana (born 1935)

Judy O'Bannon Willsey
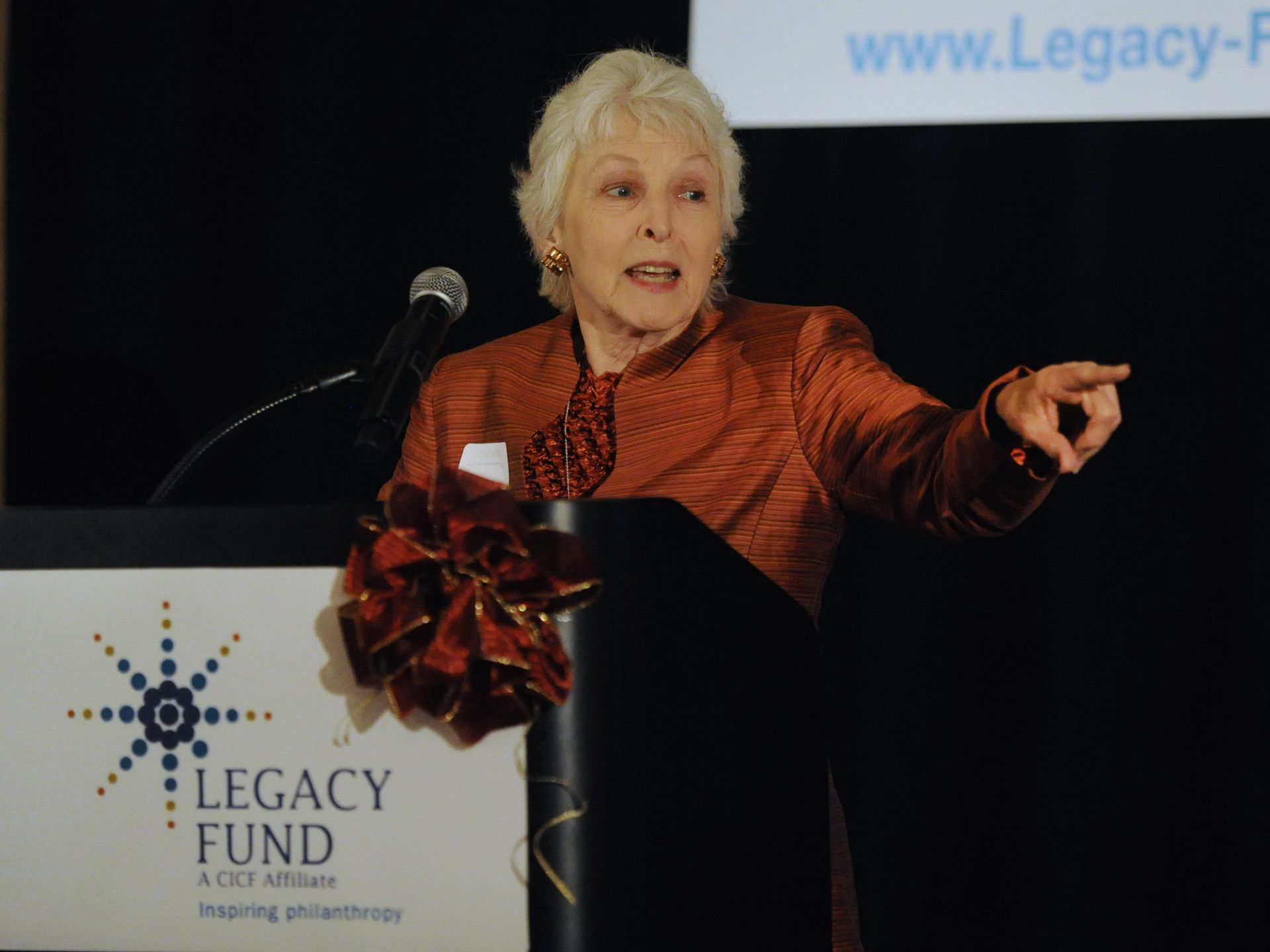

First Lady of Indiana
- In role January 13, 1997 – September 13, 2003
- Governor: Frank O'Bannon
- Preceded by: Susan Bayh
- Succeeded by: Maggie Kernan

Second Lady of Indiana
- In role January 9, 1989 – January 13, 1997
- Governor: Evan Bayh
- Preceded by: Carolyn Mutz
- Succeeded by: Maggie Kernan

Personal details
- Born: Judith Mae Asmus; April 30, 1935 (age 91) Downers Grove, Illinois, U.S.
- Party: Democratic
- Spouses: Frank O'Bannon (m. 1957; died 2003) Donald Willsey (m. 2013; died 2024)
- Education: Indiana University Bloomington; Louisville Presbyterian Theological Seminary (attended)
- Profession: Chairman, The O'Bannon Publishing Company Host & Producer, Public Television

Judith "Judy" O'Bannon Willsey (née Asmus; born April 30, 1935) is the former First Lady of the State of Indiana, serving in that role from January 13, 1997, to September 13, 2003, during the administration of her husband Governor Frank O'Bannon. She has been a leader in community development and historic preservation throughout much of her life, including having helped launch and then serving as chair of the Indiana Main Street program, and serving on the boards of the Indiana Landmarks foundation, the Indiana State Museum and the National Trust for Historic Preservation. She is also an Emmy-winning host and producer of the WFYI-TV public television series Communities Building Community and Judy O'Bannon's Foreign Exchange as well as several one-time specials, and as the chair of O'Bannon Publishing Company, published two weekly newspapers, including the award-winning The Corydon Democrat.

== Personal life and education ==
Born Judith Asmus in Downers Grove, Illinois, her family moved to Indianapolis while she was a child. O'Bannon is a graduate of Shortridge High School in Indianapolis. She graduated Phi Beta Kappa with a bachelor's degree in social service from Indiana University Bloomington in 1957. She was selected as a Rockefeller Theological Scholar and was the first woman to attend the Louisville Presbyterian Theological Seminary. Frank and Judy O'Bannon met on a blind date while both were at Indiana University. They were married on August 18, 1957, until his death on September 13, 2003. They have three children. Judy and attorney Donald Willsey were married on November 29, 2013, until his death on September 18, 2024.

== First Lady of Indiana ==
=== Communities Building Community ===
O'Bannon served as First Lady of the State of Indiana from January 13, 1997, until September 13, 2003. As First Lady, she led initiatives that were an outgrowth from her life-long advocacy and work in community development, historic preservation, education and the arts. During her husband's first term, O'Bannon launched the Hoosier Millennium: Communities Building Community initiative to encourage citizens across the state to use the upcoming calendar change of a new millennium as an opportunity to strengthen Indiana communities, asking "Who we are? Where have we come from? and What do we want to be in the future?." O'Bannon delivered Hoosier Millennium toolboxes to communities and organizations throughout the state, traveling in a motor home wrapped in the initiative's logo, with space around the bottom for individuals to sign their names at each stop. Cities, towns and organizations throughout the state launched community programs as part of the Hoosier Millennium initiative, ranging from downtown revitalization to presentations of Hoosier heritage like the "Ages of Agriculture" production at Purdue University. and the Indiana Department of Transportation's Hoosier Roadside Heritage Program featuring wildflowers and native plants along the state's highways. With broad participation by communities throughout the state, in 2001 the initiative was renamed Indiana 2016 and encouraged Hoosiers to set goals for "Where they want to be in 2016" when the state would celebrate its bicentennial.

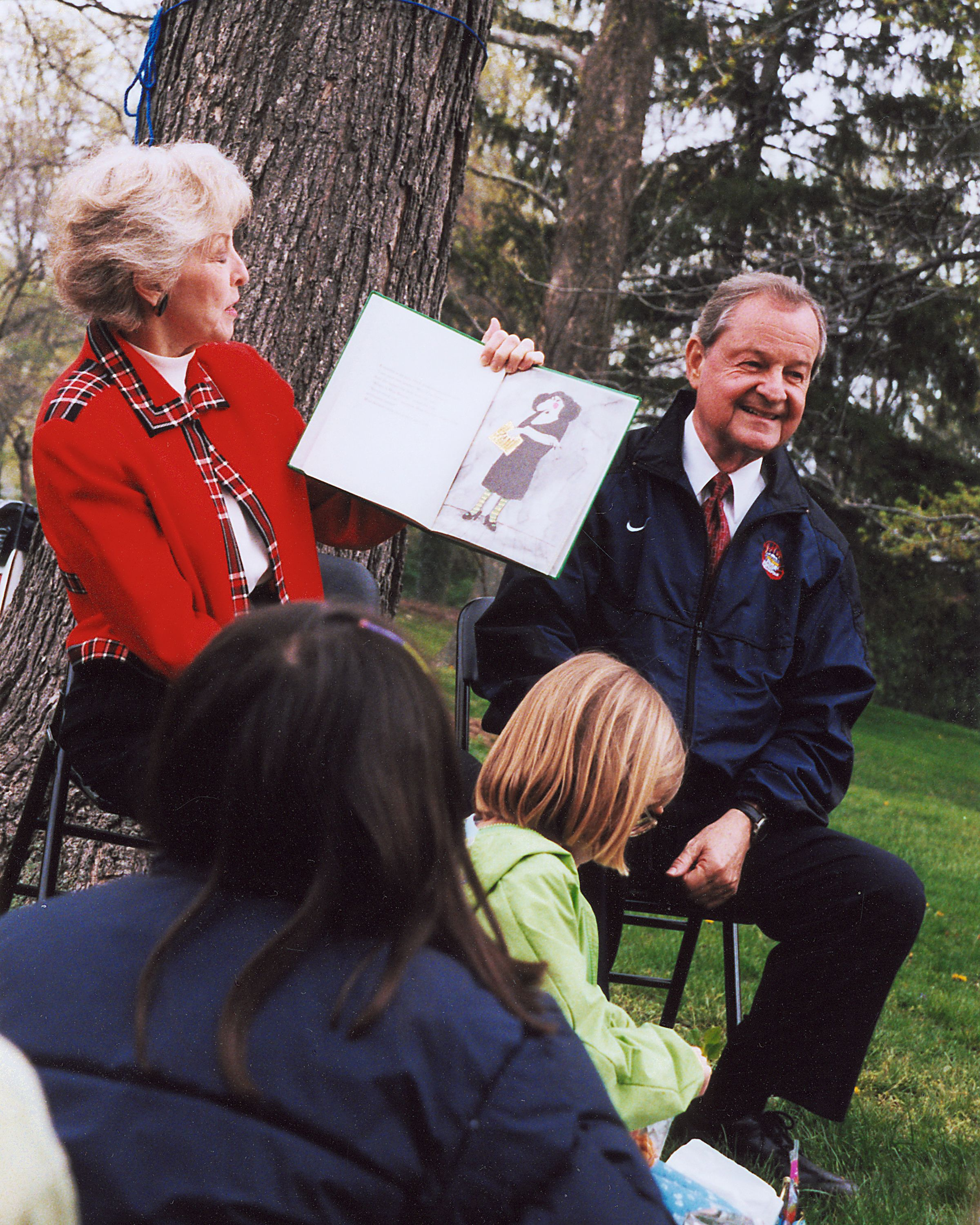
First Lady Judy O'Bannon and Governor Frank O'Bannon read to schoolchildren at the annual Reading Day at the Residence in 1999.

=== The "State's Living Room" ===
Welcoming more than 10,000 visitors per year, O'Bannon referred to the Indiana Governor's Residence as the "State's Living Room" and used the high-profile location to bring attention important community issues, including amplifying the education and reading programs that were a cornerstone of her husband's agenda in the Governor's Office. In line with that, she hosted an annual Reading Day at the Residence, which paired graduates of adult literacy programs with school children from throughout the state. She also made the Governor's Residence a showcase for Indiana arts with the creation of the First Lady's Arts Series, featuring new exhibitions each quarter by Indiana artists, and the annual Day with the Arts, co-hosted by VSA of Indiana, which welcomed more than 800 children with disabilities and volunteers for arts activities and workshops. O'Bannon, who had been a long-time advocate for people with disabilities, raised more than $1.2 million in private funds to renovate of the Governor's Residence to make it accessible for people with disabilities.

=== Building a Global Community ===
As First Lady, O'Bannon led three People to People Ambassador Program international delegations—Russia in 1999 and South Africa in 2001 and 2003—that included Indiana leaders in the areas of education, the arts, government, foundation leadership, health and HIV/AIDS and community development.

=== Work with other First Ladies ===
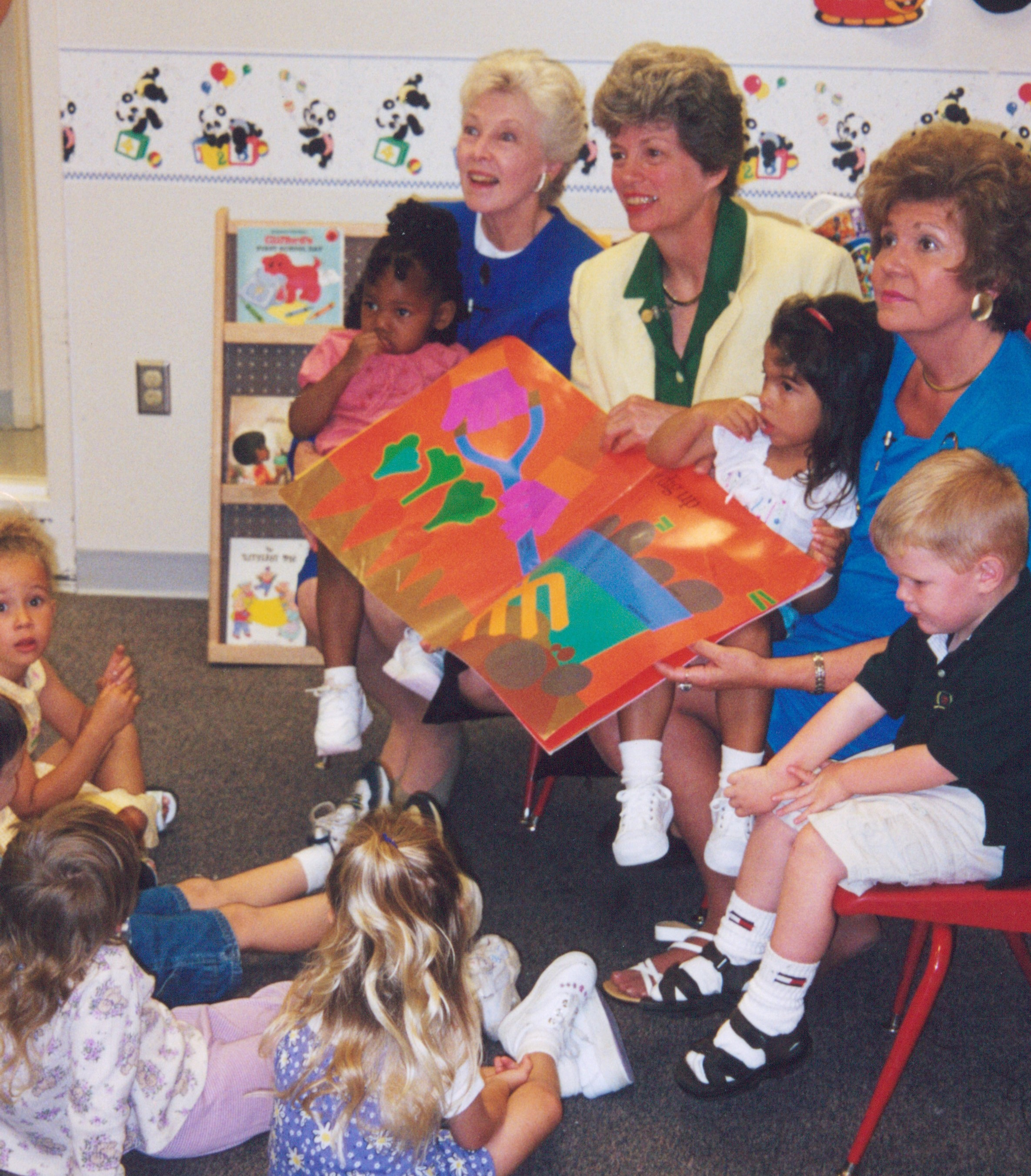
Indiana First Lady Judy O'Bannon, Ohio First Lady Hope Taft and Kentucky First Lady Judi Patton film a public service announcement on June 14, 2000, at a school in Covington, KY, promoting reading and early childhood education.

During her years as First Lady, O'Bannon actively participated in the National Governor's Association's (NGA) Spouses' Program, including hosting seminars for governors' spouses' staff. She also co-hosted with her husband the 2003 NGA Annual Meeting in Indianapolis. O'Bannon was also active in joint initiatives with her colleagues in other states, including promoting reading and early childhood education alongside Ohio First Lady Hope Taft and Kentucky First Lady Judi Patton.

== Emmy Award winning producer and host ==
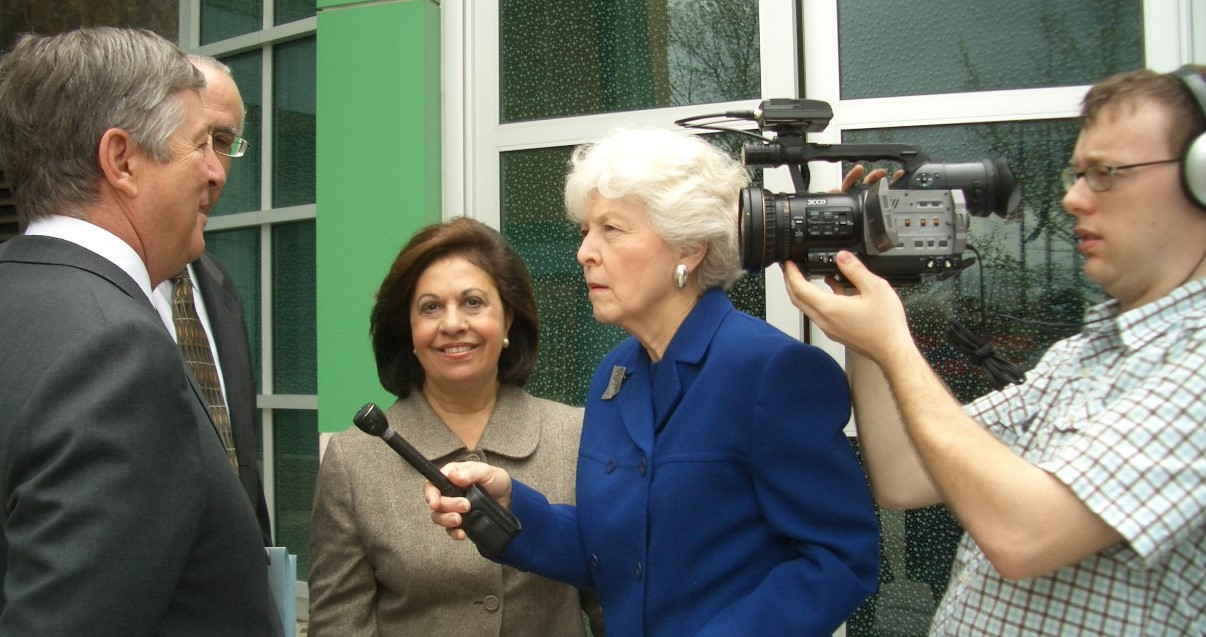
Judy O'Bannon interviews Prince Alexander of Yugoslavia along with Katherine, Crown Princess of Yugoslavia, for Communities Building Community during travels in Eastern Europe in 2006.

Working with WFYI-TV, O'Bannon helped develop the public television series Communities Building Community in 2003 as an outgrowth of her focus on communities as First Lady. O'Bannon served as the host, a co-producer and writer for the show. The series, which aired for three seasons, with additional one-time episodes airing later, featured stories from throughout the state highlighting the many ways Hoosiers "are working to strengthen their communities." In 2008, O'Bannon and co-producer Gary Harrison won the National Academy of Television Arts and Science's (NATAS) Lower Great Lakes Chapter's Emmy award for Regularly Scheduled Public Affairs Program for the Communities Building Community episode 301 "The Neighborhood." More recently, O'Bannon has hosted Judy O'Bannon's Foreign Exchange, which airs periodically on WFYI-TV, offering a collection of stories from various countries focused on "people who are finding new ways to use their mind, body and spirit to help change their world for the better." O'Bannon has also led development and co-produced several one-time feature programs that have included long-form interviews with notable individuals and perspectives on relevant community issues. In 2012, O'Bannon was once again recognized with the NATAS Lower Great Lakes Chapter's Emmy award as the co-producer of Self Sacrifice: A Son, A Soldier, A Suicide, which focused on "the enormity of suicide in the military" and told the story of Chancellor Keesling, a Hoosier soldier who had taken his own life in 2009. Her work with WFYI-TV as a host and producer includes the September 2017 special Welcome Home: the International State of Indiana and in October 2020 What's So Funny: A Judy O'Bannon Comedy Special, for which she and co-producer Gary Harrison received an Emmy nomination from the NATAS Lower Great Lakes Chapter. In December 2023, WFYI-TV premiered The Common Thread with Judy O'Bannon, a seven-part series exploring "what it means to be part of the all-inclusive, interdependent, interconnected web of everyone and everything, everywhere" through conversations with community, political and other leaders across the state of Indiana.

== O'Bannon Publishing ==
From 2003 to 2022, O'Bannon served as the chair of the O'Bannon Publishing Company, publisher of two weekly newspapers in Southern Indiana, Harrison County's The Corydon Democrat and Crawford County's Clarion News. Frank O'Bannon's grandfather Lew O'Bannon purchased The Corydon Democrat in 1907. During the time of her leadership, The Corydon Democrat was recognized as a Blue Ribbon weekly newspaper by the Hoosier State Press Association. O'Bannon's column "Community Conversations" appeared regularly in The Corydon Democrat. On June 30, 2022, O'Bannon announced the sale of The Corydon Democrat and Clarion News to Paxton Media Group.

== Politics ==
A member of the Democratic Party, O'Bannon was active in all of her husband's campaigns throughout his career in the Indiana State Senate, Lieutenant Governor of Indiana and Governor of Indiana. She has remained active in local, state and national politics. In 2008, she served as an Indiana co-chair for Hillary Clinton and campaigned for her in the state's primary traveling around the state frequently with former President Bill Clinton. She endorsed and campaigned for Barack Obama in the general election that year as he went on to win Indiana, the first Democratic presidential candidate to do so since 1964. In 2016, she supported and campaigned for Hillary Clinton for President and for Indiana's statewide Democratic ticket, including candidate for governor John R. Gregg, who had served as Speaker of the House during Frank O'Bannon's time as governor, and lieutenant governor candidate Christina Hale, who had served on Frank O'Bannon's Governor's Office staff. In 2024, O'Bannon appeared with Indiana Democratic gubernatorial candidate Jennifer McCormick in the final week before the election.

== Honors and recognitions ==
In May 2015 the Indiana State Museum recognized O'Bannon with their Heritage Keeper Award for her many contributions to the museum and the State of Indiana. Additionally, the museum renamed its main hall as the Frank and Judy O'Bannon Great Hall, recognition, in part, for the advocacy and support both O'Bannons had provided to the museum for over more than three decades (Judy O'Bannon has been a longtime member of the museum's Board of Directors, and Frank O'Bannon led efforts in the legislature and then as Lieutenant Governor and Governor to fund and ultimately build the new state museum building as the cornerstone of the White River State Park).

In 2013, NUVO newsweekly honored O'Bannon's contributions to the community, the arts and culture with its Cultural Vision Award: Lifetime Achievement recognition noting that "...if anyone has earned the right to sit back and put her feet up, it is O'Bannon. But she'd rather kick up her heels - and that is, almost literally, what she continues to do as an elder stateswoman and community activist: traveling the state and the globe, giving speeches, asking questions and figuring out ways to solve global problems with local solutions."

The Frank and Judy O'Bannon Old Northside Soccer Park was renamed in 2004 by the City of Indianapolis to recognize the O'Bannons' contributions to the revitalization of the Old Northside Historic District, where they lived during the eight years he served as lieutenant governor. Girls, Inc. of Greater Indianapolis honored O'Bannon in 2008 with its Touchstone Award for her personal and professional achievements that serve to "inspire girls to be strong, smart and bold." As part of its O'Bannon Institute for Community Service, named after Frank O'Bannon, IvyTech Community College of Indiana (the community college system he advocated for and signed into law) created the Judy O'Bannon Youth Leadership Academy "to involve young leaders from diverse backgrounds and experiences in an innovative and creative program designed to foster civic commitment and engagement."

On November 16, 2016, O'Bannon was honored by the Indiana Association for Community Economic Development for "a lifetime of moving communities forward" noting that "Judy is a full-time advocate for neighborhoods and community development. With no budget for travel, no specific professional background and no mandate requiring her to do so, Judy travels the state preaching the importance of neighborhood cooperation and community revitalization. She has chaired the Indiana Main Street Council since 1986, is active in local programs, and plays an important yet unseen role in keeping community development and related legislation alive in the Indiana General Assembly."

Acknowledging her more than 50 years of personal work and public advocacy, it was announced on June 23, 2020, that O'Bannon would receive the Indiana Landmarks 2020 Williamson Prize for "outstanding leadership in historic preservation" at its virtual annual meeting on September 12, 2020. With the announcement, Indiana Landmarks noted "For five decades, the former first lady of Indiana has been a relatable leader, hands-on preservationist and vocal champion for the value of historic places. She helped launch the Indiana Main Street program, played an instrumental role in saving individual meaningful structures, engaged countless Hoosiers in preservation efforts, and produced an award-winning TV series demonstrating the impact preservation can have on communities." In 2020, O'Bannon also was recognized by Indiana University with its Bicentennial Medal.
