= Maggie Kernan =

Former First Lady of Indiana

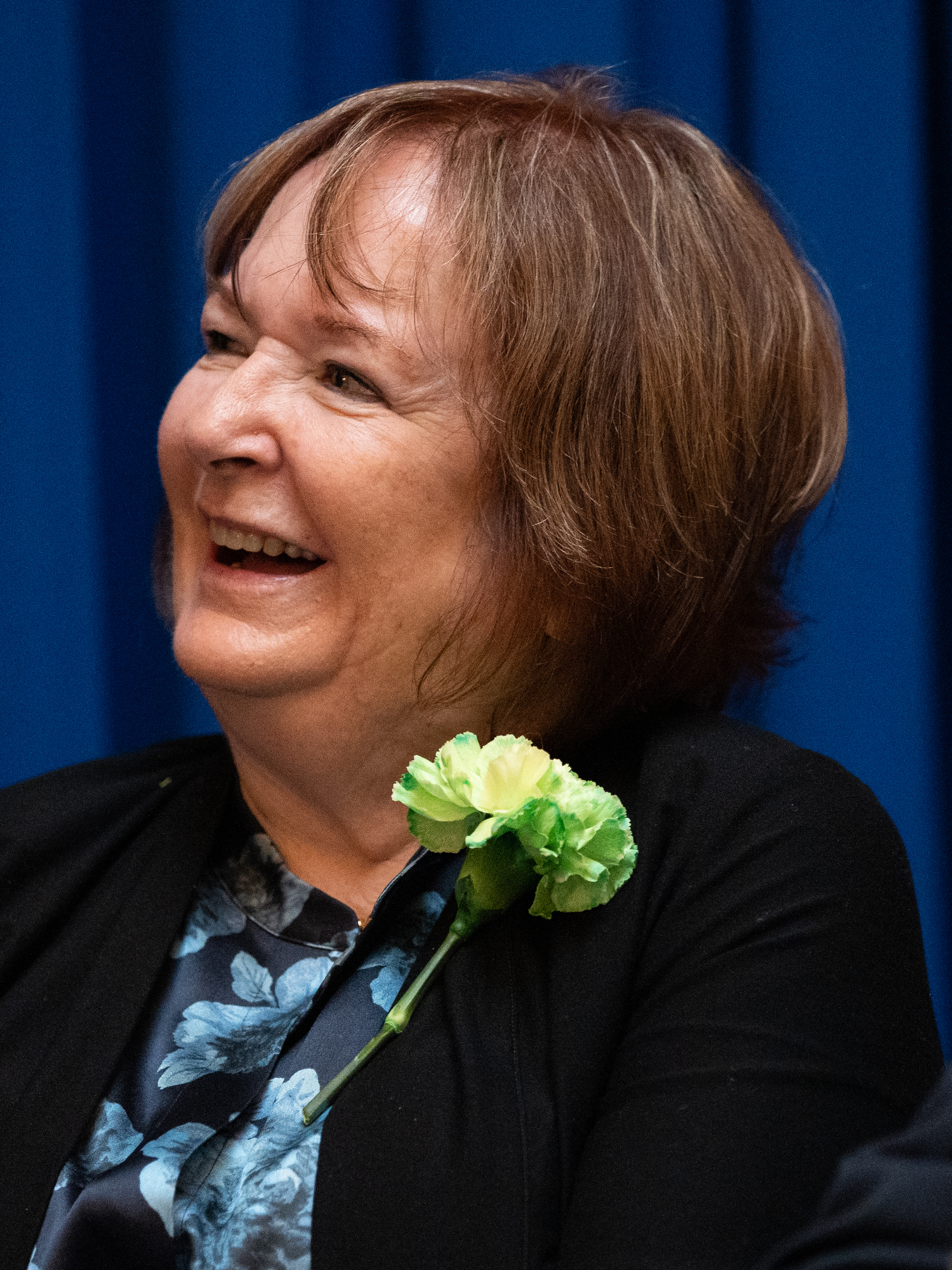

First Lady of Indiana
- In role September 13, 2003 – January 10, 2005
- Governor: Joe E. Kernan
- Preceded by: Judy O'Bannon
- Succeeded by: Cheri Daniels

Second Lady of Indiana
- In role January 13, 1997 – September 13, 2003
- Governor: Frank O'Bannon
- Preceded by: Judy O'Bannon
- Succeeded by: Steve Skillman (Second Gentleman; 2005)

First Lady of South Bend, Indiana
- In office January 3, 1988 – January 3, 1997
- Succeeded by: Peg Luecke

Personal details
- Born: June 14, 1946 (age 80)
- Spouse: Joe E. Kernan
- Education: Purdue University, West Lafayette, IN
- Profession: Vice President, 1st Source Bank

Maggie McCullough Kernan (born June 14, 1946) is a former First Lady of the State of Indiana, having served in that role from September 13, 2003, to January 10, 2005, during the administration of her husband Governor Joe Kernan. Prior to her time as First Lady, Kernan worked as an executive at 1st Source bank and was active in numerous community initiatives in her hometown of South Bend, Indiana.

== First Lady of Indiana ==
For years Kernan was a volunteer with Dream Team for Unity, a mentoring program for students in the South Bend Public Schools system. Believing strongly in the impact of mentorship on the lives of youth, as First Lady she launched a statewide effort to recruit mentors for seventh graders in Indiana's schools. Kernan also oversaw the conclusion of the $1.2 million privately funded renovation of the Indiana Governor's Residence to make it accessible for people with disabilities, a renovation started by her predecessor Judy O'Bannon.

== Personal life ==
Kernan was introduced to Joe Kernan when she was a freshman in high school by his sister, her best friend. Joe and Maggie Kernan were married in 1974 after he returned home from service as a Naval Flight Officer on the U.S.S. Kitty Hawk during the Vietnam War.

== Community activities and politics ==
Kernan worked on Roger Parent's 1979 South Bend mayoral campaign.

In 2006, Kernan took a leadership role in launching the local affiliate of the Susan G. Komen Breast Cancer Foundation in South Bend. In 2016, was instrumental in launching the South Bend Awesome Fund, an affiliate of the Awesome Foundation, which provides $1000 grants to "support ideas for businesses, events or anything else that could make this area more fun, interesting and vibrant."

In 2008, Kernan and her husband were Indiana co-chairs of Hillary Clinton's campaign and actively campaigned for Clinton leading up to the state's May primary. She supported Barack Obama in the 2008 general election, in which Obama became the first Democratic presidential candidate to win Indiana since 1964.
